= List of ordinances and acts of the Parliament of England, 1642–1660 =

This is a list of ordinances and acts of the Parliament of England from 1642 to 1660, during the English Civil War and the Interregnum.

As King Charles I of England would not assent to bills from a Parliament at war with him, decrees of Parliament before the Third English Civil War were styled 'ordinances'. The Rump Parliament reverted to using the term 'act' on 6 January 1649 when it passed the Act erecting a High Court of Justice for the trial of the King (when any possibility of reconciliation between King and Parliament was over). All but one subsequent decree were termed 'acts' through to the end of the interregnum. All of these ordinances and acts were considered void after the English Restoration due to their lack of royal assent.

== 1642 ==
- 15 March 1641/2 (Note: Under the calendar used by Parliament the new year started on 25 March (Old Style) not 1 January (New Style). See the section Differences between the start of the year in the article Old Style and New Style dates for more details.) An Ordinance of the Lords and Commons in Parliament for the safety and defence of the Kingdom of England and Dominion of Wales. (Militia Ordinance)
- 29 March 1642 Ordinance for settling the Militia of London.
- 23 May 1642 Ordinance for raising 1,000 volunteers to be employed in the reduction of Ireland.
- 28 May 1642 Ordinance for raising men for Ireland.
- 4 June 1642 An Ordinance for the securing the sum of £100,000 agreed to be lent the Parliament by several companies and citizens of London for the use of the Kingdom.
- 9 June 1642 Ordinance for bringing in Plate, Money, and Horses.
- 17 June 1642 The Ordinance for the Sea-Adventure to Ireland.
- 1 July 1642 Ordinance for the Earl of Warwick to remain in his command of the Fleet.
- 2 July 1642 Ordinance for appointing Lord Wharton to be Lord Lieutenant of Buckinghamshire.
- 5 July 1642 Ordinance for raising 5,000 foot and 500 horse for Ireland.
- 6 July 1642 Ordinance for raising 2,000 men for relieving Hull.
- 15 July 1642 An Ordinance appointing the Earl of Essex to be Captain General.
- 1 August 1642 An Ordinance concerning the Subsidy of Tonnage and Poundage.
- 10 August 1642 Ordinance appointing Sir Gilbert Gerrard Treasurer of the Army.
- 10 August 1642 Ordinance for Henry Herbert to repair to Monmouthshire and publish the Declaration against the Commission of Array.
- 24 August 1642 An Ordinance for the better observation of the monthly Fast.
- 26 August 1642 Ordinance for raising money in London.
- 26 August 1642 An Ordinance inhibiting the Importation of Currants.
- 2 September 1642 An Ordinance concerning Stage Plays.
- 15 September 1642 To secure the repayment of money advanced by the inhabitants of London.
- 15 September 1642 Ordinance appointing Commissioners of the Navy.
- 15 September 1642 Ordinance appointing Thomas Smith secretary of the Admiralty.
- 17 September 1642 Ordinance for putting the City of Worcester in a posture of defence.
- 5 October 1642 Ordinance for raising 2,000 foot for Ireland.
- 6 October 1642 Ordinance for Commissioners for Ireland.
- 19 October 1642 Ordinance to give leave to any of His Majesty's subjects to set forth ships to take such ships as shall go to relieve the Rebels in Ireland.
- 20 October 1642 Ordinance for the Earl of Warwick to appoint commanders in the Navy in the English and Irish Seas.
- 22 October 1642 Ordinance appointing the Earl of Warwick to command a second army to be raised about London and the counties adjacent.
- 24 October 1642 An Ordinance making provision for those that shall be maimed in this present war in the service of the Parliament and for the wives and children of those that shall be slain.
- 24 October 1642 Ordinance for the security and safe conduct of the commissioners of the Realm of Scotland.
- 21 October 1642 Ordinance for the security and safe conduct of such Divines as shall come from the Realm of Scotland to the Assembly of Divines in this Kingdom.
- 1 November 1642 Ordinance concerning apprentices that list themselves as soldiers.
- 9 November 1642 Ordinance for the disciplining of the Army.
- 15 November 1642 Order or ordinance empowering Maximilian Bard and other commissioners to seize horses in and about London.
- 26 November 1642 An Ordinance for the assessing of all such as have not contributed upon the Propositions of both Houses of Parliament for the raising of money, plate, horse and horsemen, etc.
- 29 November 1642 An explanation of the former ordinance for assessing such as have not contributed, etc.
- 29 November 1642 An Ordinance for the better provision of Victuals and other Necessaries for the Army and for payment and satisfaction to be made for such provisions.
- 29 November 1642 An Ordinance to give power to divers persons to set forth ships for the taking of all ships that they shall take coming against the Kingdom.
- 29 November 1642 An Ordinance for repaying money lent upon the Propositions.
- 29 November 1642 An Ordinance concerning John Pickering, Esq.
- 7 December 1642 An Order being an explanation to some things in the Ordinance for assessing of such persons as have not contributed, etc.
- 8 December 1642 An Ordinance for taxing several counties for the support of the Army.
- 14 December 1642 An Ordinance for the better and more speedy execution of the late Ordinance of the 29th of November, 1642.
- 15 December 1642 Ordinance for the Association of the Counties of Leicester, Derby, Notts, etc.
- 20 December 1642 An Ordinance for the Association of Norfolk, Suffolk, Essex, Cambridge, etc.
- 24 December 1642 Ordinance for reimbursing Monies for the Defence of Devonshire.
- 31 December 1642 Ordinance for the Association of the Counties of Warwick and Stafford, etc.

== 1643 ==
- 2 January 1642/3 Ordinance for the Parliament Forces to drive the King's from Brill in Buckinghamshire.
- 9 January 1642/3 Instructions for Sir William Brereton, Sir George Booth, and the rest of the Deputy Lieutenants of Chester.
- 9 January 1642/3 A Declaration and Ordinance for the Defence of the County of Lincoln.
- 10 January 1642/3 An Ordinance for Raising Forces in the County of Wilts.
- 14 January 1642/3 An Ordinance for assessing the Counties of Northampton, Leicester, Derby, etc.
- 14 January 1642/3 Ordinance for stopping the coal trade to Newcastle, etc.
- 17 January 1642/3 Order for assessing persons in the County of Devon towards the charge of the Army there.
- 17 January 1642/3 Order to pay money to the Deputy Lieutenants of Devonshire.
- 21 January 1642/3 Ordinance against removing the Term to Oxford.
- 21 January 1642/3 Ordinance concerning the Customs for the continuance of the ordinance of concerning the subsidy of Tonnage and Poundage from 1 March 1643, to 25 March 1644.
- 26 January 1642/3 Ordinance for assessing Lancashire for the relief of Manchester, etc.
- 27 January 1642/3 Ordinance for the Somersetshire men to have their own contribution-money already raised for maintenance of the Forces raised there.
- 27 January 1642/3 Ordinance for the Assessment of the Malignants in Somersetshire.
- 30 January 1642/3 Ordinance for new Loans and Contributions, etc., for Ireland.
- 3 February 1642/3 An Ordinance for the better raising and levying of Mariners, Sailors and others for the present guarding of the Seas, etc.
- 3 February 1642/3 Ordinance for raising Forces and Money in the County of Wilts.
- 8 February 1642/3 An Ordinance for the Earl of Warwick to command the Fleet.
- 8 February 1642/3 Ordinance for assessing divers persons in London according to the Ordinance of 29 November.
- 11 February 1642/3 An Ordinance for securing Hampshire by raising men and money.
- 11 February 1642/3 An Ordinance to appoint Sir William Waller Serjeant-Major-General of the Forces in Gloucestershire and other adjacent counties, and for paying his army.
- 13 February 1642/3 Order concerning the City and County of Exon.
- 13 February 1642/3 Ordinance for seizing the effects of persons in Nottingham who have been in arms against the Parliament.
- 15 February 1642/3 Ordinance for a public confession to be used at the Fast.
- 21 February 1642/3 Ordinance for sequestering the profits of St. Margaret's, Lothbury.
- 21 February 1642/3 Ordinance for sequestering the profits of St. Martin's in the Vintry.
- 21 February 1642/3 Ordinance for rating sea coal.
- 23 February 1642/3 Ordinance for Mr. Nathaniel Fiennes to raise a regiment of Horse.
- 24 February 1642/3 Ordinance for raising money for the maintenance of the Army by a Weekly Assessment.
- 4 March 1642/3 Explanatory Ordinance.
- 4 March 1642/3 Ordinance for the defence of Taunton.
- 6 March 1642/3 Order for Relief of Maimed Soldiers and their Families.
- 7 March 1642/3 Order for intrenching and fortifying the City of London.
- 13 March 1642/3 Ordinance for allowing one third part of Prize goods to the Captors.
- 24 March 1642/3 Ordinance for raising money for the defence of Exeter.
- 25 March 1642/3 Ordinance for the Commissioners of the Customs to repay themselves £20,000.
- 27 March 1643 Ordinance for sequestering notorious Delinquents' Estates.
- 31 March 1643 Ordinance for raising money weekly in Hertfordshire.
- 5 April 1643 Ordinance to provide Mariners for supplying the Navy.
- 5 April 1643 Order for securing £40,000 borrowed from the City of London.
- 10 April 1643 Ordinance for raising money in the Isle of Wight.
- 10 April 1643 Ordinance for associating the Counties of Warwick, Stafford and Salop.
- 11 April 1643 Ordinance for the repayment of £2,600 out of the assessment of Dorsetshire.
- 11 April 1643 Ordinance for the Explanation of the Weekly Assessment in London.
- 11 April 1643 An Additional Ordinance for sequestering Delinquents, Estates in Devon.
- 12 April 1643 An Ordinance giving power to the Committee for the Militia of London to raise regiments of Volunteers.
- 12 April 1643 An Ordinance giving power to the Mayor of Plymouth to seize corn. etc., for that town.
- 12 April 1643 An Ordinance assessing persons in Yarmouth for the defence of the town.
- 13 April 1643 An Ordinance to prevent the Judges, Officers, and Ministers of the Court of King's Bench, Common Pleas, and Exchequer, from repairing to Oxford to keep the next term there.
- 18 April 1643 Ordinance for Lord Gray's forces quartered at Watford to join the Earl of Essex, out of the Bounds of their Association.
- 20 April 1643 An Order for raising a regiment of Volunteers, under Sir John Wittewrong, in the County of Hertford, to serve out of the Limits of their Association.
- 25 April 1643 An Ordinance for Collections to be made for relief of Captives in Algiers.
- 25 April 1643 An Order, engaging the public faith, to secure repayment of money, etc., advanced for the support of the army under Sir William Waller.
- 29 April 1643 Order for sequestering the estates of Delinquents in Devon.
- 2 May 1643 Further Order for the execution of Martial Discipline in the Trained Bands in the Cities of London and Westminster and in the County of Middlesex.
- 2 May 1643 A Further Ordinance for Colonel Oliver Cromwell and others to seize goods and chattels of Malignants in Cambridgeshire.
- 2 May 1643 Order for Sir Walter Earle to command the militia in Dorset.
- 2 May 1643 Order for the indemnity of the inhabitants of Barnstaple, for fortifying their town.
- 3 May 1643 Order for preventing disorderly assemblies in Dorset, Somerset, Wilts, etc.
- 3 May 1643 Order to depute two Persons in every county to see the Ordinance for the weekly Assessment put into Execution.
- 4 May 1643 Order for Garrisons in Hampshire to be paid out of the King's revenues in that County.
- 5 May 1643 Order for burning the Book of Sports.
- 6 May 1643 Order for the repayment of monies lent by the City of London.
- 6 May 1643 Order explaining Ordinance of 28 November 1642, concerning the assessment.
- 7 May 1643 An Ordinance for the speedy raising and levying of money throughout the whole of England and dominion of Wales: members of both Houses excepted.
- 10 May 1643 Order to redress the Abuses in taking Horses for supply of the Army.
- 10 May 1643 Ordinance following Commission granted by the Earl of Essex to Colonel James Mauleverer to levy and raise a regiment of harquebussers, pledging public faith for repayment of monies, etc., lent to him.
- 10 May 1643 Order for the speedy levy of assessments under Ordinances of 3 and 7 May 1643, and 30 January 1642/3, and Act for a Contribution towards the Relief of Ireland.
- 10 May 1643 Ordinance as to the levy of the weekly assessment in Southwark, etc.
- 16 May 1643 Further Ordinance (amending that of 3 May) for suppressing riots in Dorset, Somerset, and Wilts.
- 17 May 1643 Ordinance for the sequestration of the jurisdiction of William, Lord Archbishop of Canterbury.
- 17 May 1643 Ordinance (amending that of 30 January 1642–3) for the contribution for the relief of Ireland, authorizing Commissioners to receive the money.
- 18 May 1643 Ordinance exempting estates of Earl of St. Albans from former Ordinance for sequestration of Papists' estates: on account of his services in Ireland.
- 18 May 1643 Ordinance amending Ordinance of 7 May for the raising and levying of money by allowing sums raised in the Eastern Association to be applied to the maintenance of the army of the Association.
- 24 May 1643 Ordinance authorising Colonel Walter Long to take and collect such moneys as have been formerly by him and others assessed and as yet unpaid, in Essex, Hertford, and Bedford, by a Commission from the Earl of Essex.
- 26 May 1643 Order for £10,000 a year to be paid to the Earl of Essex out of the estates of Delinquents.
- 26 May 1643 Ordinance transferring the County of Huntingdon from the Midland Association to the Eastern Association.
- 29 May 1643 Further Ordinance for seizing horses for the use of the Army, amending that of 10 May.
- 30 May 1643 Order empowering the Committee at Haberdashers' Hall to cess estates in London and twenty miles round that have not paid their due proportion of assessment under the Ordinance of the Twentieth part.
- 30 May 1643 Ordinance for the prevention of the smuggling of prohibited goods.
- 30 May 1643 Ordinance for the peace of the County of Kent, and for enabling them to associate with the City of London or any other Counties adjacent
- 30 May 1643 Further Ordinance against removing the term to Oxford (cf. Ord. of 21 Jan., 1642–3.)
- 1 June 1643 Further Ordinance for the speedy raising of money, appointing members of new Committees. (cf. 30 Jan., 1642–3, 3 May and 10 May 1643.)
- 5 June 1643 Ordinance to raise £100 weekly for the defence of Southwark, and appointing a Committee.
- 5 June 1643 Ordinance for raising forces for the reduction of Newcastle, with Propositions accepted by both Houses.
- 9 June 1643 Ordinance for a Covenant to reveal plots against the Parliament to be taken by all who are lovers of their country.
- 10 June 1643 Further Ordinance (amending that of 17 May) to sequester the jurisdiction and temporalities of Archbishop Laud.
- 12 June 1643 Ordinance appointing Sir Thomas Middleton Commander-in-Chief of the Counties of Denbigh, Montgomery, Flint, Merioneth, Carnarvon, and Anglesey.
- 12 June 1643 Ordinance for an assembly of Divines to settle the doctrine of the Church.
- 12 June 1643 Ordinance appointing the Earl of Denbigh as Commander-in-Chief of the Counties of Warwick, Worcester, Stafford, Salop, etc., and to succeed Lord Brooke as Lord Lieutenant of the County of Warwick.
- 14 June 1643 Ordinance for correcting and regulating abuses of the Press.
- 24 June 1643 Ordinance for raising and paying Forces for the Defence of the Isle of Wight.
- 5 July 1643 Ordinance for paying the Scottish Army in Ireland, by arrangement with members of the Company of the Merchant Adventurers.
- 10 July 1643 Ordinance for securing the town of Lynn and the adjacent country in case the Popish Northern Army should force a passage through Lincolnshire into Norfolk.
- 10 July 1643 Ordinance for the indemnity of the Mayor of Hull and others for seizing the forts, and the persons of Sir John Hotham and Sir Edward Rhodes, and Captain Hotham.
- 10 July 1643 Ordinance forbidding Judges and Ministers of the law to execute their commissions or hold Assizes or Gaol Delivery during the Summer Vacation.
- 12 July 1643 Order for raising forces in the Parts of Holland in the County of Lincoln.
- 12 July 1643 Order confirming the Office of Chief Butler of England and Wales to Sir William Waller.
- 14 July 1643 Ordinance for the encouragement of Adventurers to make new subscriptions for towns, cities, and lands in Ireland.
- 15 July 1643 Ordinance adding names to the Committee for the Twentieth Part in the County of Sussex.
- 18 July 1643 Further Ordinance for raising money for the defence of the county of Huntingdon, giving power to the Deputy-Lieutenants and Committee to receive the weekly assessments.
- 19 July 1643 Ordinance for raising money for the defence of Northamptonshire.
- 19 July 1643 Order for keeping a solemn Fast and Humiliation the 21st July.
- 19 July 1643 Ordinance for nominating and appointing certain Commissioners to be sent to Scotland to treat and conclude divers matters concerning the safety and peace of both kingdoms, with instructions.
- 20 July 1643 Declaration or ordinance concerning the late insurrection in Kent, offering pardon to those who submit.
- 22 July 1643 Ordinance appointing the Lord Fairfax governor of the town of Kingston upon Hull, in place of Sir John Hotham.
- 22 July 1643 Ordinance for the speedy raising and levying of moneys by way of charge or impost upon several commodities (Excise Ordinance).
- 25 July 1643 Ordinance for the speedy raising of a Body of Horse out of certain specified counties, to resist the outrages of the King's Army, and to be under the Earl of Manchester, who is appointed by this Ordinance, for this service, to be Commander-in-Chief both for Horse and Foot.
- 27 July 1643 Ordinance appointing a Committee for the County of Surrey to raise forces for the defence of the county.
- 29 July 1643 Ordinance permitting sums of money raised in the County of Huntingdon to be spent upon the defence of the county.
- 29 July 1643 Ordinance appointing Commissioners to receive loans and subscriptions in Holland for the relief and maintenance of the army in Ireland.
- 29 July 1643 Ordinance for the defence of London.
- 1 August 1643 Ordinance ordering William Bishop of London, Thomas Turner, Doctor of Divinity, and John Juxon, Esquire, to repay a sum received, under a Decree in the Exchequer Chamber, conveying certain impropriations to the King's Majesty, who had leased them to the aforesaid.
- 3 August 1643 Ordinance for raising money for the maintenance of the Army, and other great affairs, by a weekly assessment upon specified counties for two months, beginning from the 3 August 1643.
- 10 August 1643 Ordinance for the speedy raising and impressing of men for the defence of the kingdom.
- 10 August 1643 Ordinance appointing Committees for managing the affairs of the Associated Counties (Eastern Association).
- 10 August 1643 Ordinance for payment of £10,000 to Sir William Waller out of the moneys that shall come in upon the twentieth part within the cities of London and Westminster and the places adjacent.
- 12 August 1643 Ordinance for the speedy raising of 1,000 dragoons and £13,500 for their equipment and maintenance, in the County of Essex.
- 16 August 1643 Ordinance for seizing the estates of the rebels in Kent (cf. Ordinance of 20 July).
- 16 August 1643 Ordinance for the speedy raising of 20,000 soldiers in the counties of the Eastern Association.
- 17 August 1643 Ordinance for the security of the city of London, with an oath to be taken by all persons within the cities of London and Westminster and the suburbs thereof or within the lines of communication.
- 18 August 1643 Ordinance for a speedy supply of monies within the city of London and Liberties thereof, for the maintenance of the forces for the defence of the City.
- 18 August 1643 Ordinance explaining a former Ordinance for the sequestration of Delinquents' Estates, with an oath to be administered to delinquents.
- 23 August 1643 Ordinance for the relief of Gloucester.
- 24 August 1643 Ordinance for repayment of £50,000 advanced by the City of London.
- 24 August 1643 Ordinance for fortifying the Hundred of Lovingland in the county of Suffolk and other adjacent Hundreds, for the defence of Yarmouth, etc.
- 25 August 1643 Ordinance (explaining Ordinance of 25 July 1643) for raising a Body of Horse for the preservation of the Kingdom.
- 26 August 1643 Ordinance for the free passage of Bullion into the ports of Dover and London and into and out of the Mint.
- 26 August 1643 Ordinance for disposing of the Houses of persons who have avoided payment of the weekly assessment.
- 26 August 1643 Ordinance for the monopoly of an engine, invented by Dominicke Petit, Peter Deliques, and Claudius Fancault, for recovering ships, lading and cannon, which have been overwhelmed in the seas and rivers of the Kingdom.
- 26 August 1643 Ordinance for demolishing superstitions images, etc., and removing Communion Tables from the East End of Churches, before 1 November 1643.
- 5 September 1643 Ordinance for the speedy raising of monies to furnish magazines, and raise forces within the Hamlets of the Tower, the City of Westminster, the Borough of Southwark, and other parts of the counties of Middlesex and Surrey within the Forts and Lines of Communication and Parishes adjacent.
- 6 September 1643 Ordinance empowering the Committee of the Militia of the City of London to send troops under Sir William Waller, to join the Lord General the Earl of Essex, or elsewhere under the commission of the Lord General.
- 6 September 1643 Ordinance to levy arrears of assessments in the County of Suffolk.
- 6 September 1643 Order for Lieut. Colonel Owen Rowe to contract for arms to the value of £5,000.
- 6 September 1643 Ordinance for raising money in the counties of the Eastern Association for payment of the Earl of Manchester's army.
- 8 September 1643 Further Ordinance for settling the Excise, annulling the former Ordinance (that of 22 July) as in many parts defective.
- 8 September 1643 Ordinance restricting the passage of travellers from Ireland, to prevent the coming over of Irish rebels.
- 13 September 1643 Ordinance for obtaining a loan from the inhabitants of Ipswich, for the navy.
- 15 September 1643 Ordinance for impressing 5,000 infantry to be under the command of Sir William Waller.
- 15 September 1643 Ordinance permitting apprentices to watermen in the Thames to serve their time under Sir William Waller without punishment or prejudice.
- 18 September 1643 Ordinance for the relief of the distressed clergy of Ireland.
- 18 September 1643 Ordinance for the payment of the Commissioners and Auditors of Excise together with an oath to be administered to them.
- 18 September 1643 Ordinance providing that the Commissioners of Customs shall repay themselves £30,000 advanced for the Navy.
- 19 September 1643 Ordinance (supplementing that of 11 November 1642) for the defence of the county of Hertford, permitting its association with the City of London or other places.
- 20 September 1643 Ordinance adding Lincoln to the counties of the Eastern Association, and for the maintenance of the Army of those counties, with the names of the members of the Committees of the various counties.
- 20 September 1643 Declaration and Order that no one shall have any command under the Parliament unless he shall have taken the Covenant (i.e., the Solemn League and Covenant).
- 21 September 1643 An Ordinance for the sequestration of all revenues of the King, Queen, and Prince, in England and Wales, and Berwick-upon-Tweed, with provisions for sequestering any of the Royal officers who may refuse obedience to this Ordinance.
- 30 September 1643 Ordinance to compel the City Companies to pay their assessments according to the rates appointed by the Common Council.
- 2 October 1643 Ordinance to supply wood to the poor and other degrees of people in the cities of London and Westminster, and their suburbs and liberties.
- 2 October 1643 Ordinance for fortifying the Isle of Wight.
- 7 October 1643 Ordinance for repayment of £30,000 to the Merchant Adventurers.
- 9 October 1643 Ordinance fixing the price of wines in accordance with the recent Excise Ordinance.
- 9 October 1643 Ordinance empowering the Committee in Northamptonshire to raise money for six months for the defence for the County.
- 9 October 1643 Ordinance for sending forces from London to the Lord General for the recovery of Reading.
- 9 October 1643 Ordinance for assessing members of either House who absent themselves from Parliament or wage war upon it.
- 11 October 1643 Ordinance empowering the Earl of Manchester to put into execution, in the counties of the Eastern Association, former Ordinances for collecting assessments and sequestrating estates of Delinquents.
- 12 October 1643 Further Ordinance for the incorporation of the Merchant Adventurers for the better maintenance of the woollen trade.
- 16 October 1643 Ordinance for the repayment of all monies that may be lent for the speedy bringing of the Scottish army into England to the assistance of the Parliament.
- 17 October 1643 Ordinance that brewers shall pay the duties imposed by the Excise Ordinance before delivering their goods.
- 23 October 1643 Ordinance for the speedy raising of monies formerly imposed but not yet paid, within the City of London and the Liberties thereof.
- 23 October 1643 Ordinances giving authority to dig and search for saltpetre to make gunpowder.
- 23 October 1643 Ordinance supplementing a former Ordinance (5 September 1643) for raising money within the lines of communication, by removing the exemptions allowed to members of both Houses and their servants.
- 27 October 1643 Ordinance for raising £66,666 13s. 4d. by loan, for assistance to the Scottish army in its expedition into England.
- 27 October 1643 Ordinance for pressing 3,000 soldiers in Lancashire.
- 31 October 1643 An Ordinance forbidding communication with the King and Queen, for the better prevention of spies.
- 31 October 1643 Ordinance for relief of maimed soldiers and of widows and children of soldiers slain in the service of the Parliament.
- 2 November 1643 Ordinance for the government of the plantations in the West Indies, appointing the Earl of Warwick Governor-in-Chief and Lord High Admiral of those islands.
- 4 November 1643 Ordinance for associating Kent, Sussex, Surrey, and Hampshire, with list of members of Committees.
- 7 November 1643 Order for London Vintners to pay Excise for Wines.
- 10 November 1643 Ordinance for making a new Great Seal and for annulling certain Acts under the King's Great Seal since the 22nd May, 1642.
- 15 November 1643 Ordinance for raising money for the defence of Plymouth, by means of a rate upon merchandise exported and imported.
- 20 November 1643 Ordinance for preserving from sale and keeping for public use certain books, evidences, records and writings taken by distress or otherwise.
- 23 November 1643 Ordinance for raising money for the defence of Southampton.
- 28 November 1643 Ordinance supplementing the Excise Ordinance.
- 1 December 1643 Ordinance enabling persons approved by Parliament to set forth ships for guarding the seas, and prohibiting trade with ports in hostility to the Parliament.
- 7 December 1643 Ordinance appointing the Earl of Warwick Lord High Admiral of England.
- 18 December 1643 Ordinance for erecting and maintaining a garrison at Newport Pagnell, in the county of Bucks.
- 18 December 1643 Ordinance amending Ordinance of 14 September giving further powers to the Committee for Volunteers for Hertfordshire, enabling them to raise and maintain forces for the defence of the County.
- 20 December 1643 Ordinance disqualifying anyone who has not taken the Covenant from being a member of the Common Council or holding any office in the City of London.
- 23 December 1643 Ordinance empowering the Committee of the Militia of London to send out forces under Major General Brown to the assistance of Sir William Waller.
- 23 December 1643 Ordinance (amending that of 21 September) providing for the payment to certain receivers of revenues due to the King, Queen, and Prince from sequestrated estates of Delinquents.
- 23 December 1643 Ordinance moderating the duty on Tobacco.
- 25 December 1643 Ordinance dismissing all Clerks of Record who have joined the King.

== 1644 ==
=== January 1644 ===
- 6 January 1643/4 Declaration and Order exempting the University of Cambridge from the Ordinance for sequestering estates of Delinquents.
- 9 January 1643/4 An ordinance touching the Excise of Flesh victuals and salt.
- 10 January 1643/4 Ordinance for pressing and levying mariners, sailors, etc., for the defence of the kingdom.
- 20 January 1643/4 An Ordinance for recruiting and regulating the Forces of the Eastern Association under the Earl of Manchester.
- 22 January 1643/4 An Ordinance for regulating the University of Cambridge and for removing scandalous ministers in the University and in the counties of the Eastern Association.
- 22 January 1643/4 Ordinance preventing the adjournment of the term of the Courts of Justice, and the conveyance of records, etc., to Oxford.
- 29 January 1643/4 Ordinance for appointing High Sheriffs and for altering the terms of the oath administered to them.
- 30 January 1643/4 Ordinance for officers of the Courts of Justice, lawyers, etc., to take the Covenant.
- 30 January 1643/4 Ordinance amending the Ordinance of 28 August 1642 (against the importion of currants) in favour of the Levant Company.

=== February 1644 ===
- 1 February 1643/4 Ordinance for the present recruiting and payment of the army under the immediate command of the Lord General.
- 5 February 1643/4 Ordinance for the defence of Poole, Plymouth, and Lyme.
- 5 February 1643/4 Ordinance enjoining the taking of the late Solemn League and Covenant throughout the kingdom of England and the Dominion of Wales: with instructions.
- 13 February 1643/4 Ordinance for Sir Thomas Middleton to raise forces within the counties of Flint, Denbigh, Montgomery, Merioneth, Carnarvon, and Anglesey.
- 16 February 1643/4 Ordinance for appointing for a period not exceeding three months, a Committee of both Houses to join with the Committee and Commissioners of Scotland, for the better managing the affairs of both nations, in accordance with the late Covenant and Treaty.
- 17 February 1643/4 Ordinance for raising a new loan and assessment in the County of Middlesex for the defence of the county and of the Cities of London and Westminster and for the preservation of Uxbridge.
- 22 February 1643/4 Ordinance for taking and receiving the accounts of the whole Kingdom.
- 26 February 1643/4 Ordinance for the free importation of Bullion (cf. Ordinance 26 August 1643.)
- 26 February 1643/4 Ordinance for Excise money raised in Hull to be employed for that Garrison.
- 27 February 1643/4 Ordinance empowering the Lord Fairfax to remove scandalous ministers in Yorkshire and replace them by able, learned and godly divines.
- 27 February 1643/4 Ordinance empowering the Lord Fairfax and Sir Thomas Fairfax to press soldiers in Yorkshire.
- 27 February 1643/4 Ordinance for selling all ships and goods taken by reprisal and belonging to the State.
- 29 February 1643/4 Order for Reformado officers to be paid out of customs on currants.

=== March 1644 ===
- 4 March 1643/4 Ordinance to regulate the Duty on Tobacco for one year (cf. Ord. 23 December 1643).
- 5 March 1643/4 Ordinance concerning the repayment of money to the Merchant Adventurers. (cf. 7 Oct., 1643.)
- 5 March 1643/4 Ordinance for paying the army under Lord Fairfax by means of a sum owed to the Merchant Adventurers, the repayment of which was postponed by the preceding Ordinance.
- 7 March 1643/4 Ordinance for upholding the Government and Fellowship of merchants of England trading into the Levant Seas.
- 19 March 1643/4 Further Ordinance empowering the Levant Company to import currants. (cf. Ord. 26 Aug., 1642, and 30 Jan., 1643–4.)
- 21 March 1643/4 Order for Free Trade to Sunderland and Blithe and to carry corn for our Brethren of Scotland.
- 26 March 1644 Ordinance (amending that of 1st Feb., 1643–4) for the speedy completing and maintaining of the army under the immediate command of the Earl of Essex.
- 26 March 1644 Ordinance providing that inhabitants of the Cities of London and Westminster, the Hamlets of the Tower, Borough of Southwark, and other places within the lines of Communication, and Weekly Bills of Mortality, shall contribute the value of one meal in the week for the auxiliary forces now being raised. (Ordinance of the Weekly Meal.)
- 26 March 1644 Ordinance empowering Sir William Brereton to take subscriptions and command forces in the County of Chester and adjacent parts.
- 30 March 1644 Ordinance for raising and maintaining 3,000 Foot, 1,200 Horse, and 500 Dragoons to be commanded by Sir William Waller as Serjeant Major General of the forces under the Earl of Essex and of all other forces in the associated counties of Southampton, Surrey, Sussex, and Kent.

=== April 1644 ===
- 2 April 1644 Ordinance for the defence of the town of Northampton.
- 3 April 1644 Ordinance to raise £20,000 by loan to enable Sir William Waller to follow up his victory over Hopton.
- 3 April 1644 Ordinance for the making of salt petre to continue for two years from the 25 March 1655, of.
- 8 April 1644 Ordinance for the better observation of the Lord's Day.
- 8 April 1644 Ordinance for felling 600 Timber Trees in His Majesty's Forest of Waltham for the use of the Navy.
- 8 April 1644 Ordinance continuing for a year the rates and charges of Excise and new Impost expressed in the Ordinance of 11 September 1643.
- 16 April 1644 Ordinance (removing an exemption in that of 2 October 1643) permitting the felling of timber trees in the woods of several Delinquents for the use of the Navy.
- 16 April 1644 Ordinance empowering the Committee of Both Kingdoms to prepare, by Friday, 26 April 1644, Propositions for a safe and well grounded peace.
- 17 April 1644 Ordinance continuing for four months the Ordinance regarding the defence of Hertfordshire, dated 18 December 1643.
- 25 April 1644 Ordinance extending (up to Wednesday, 1 May) the time for preparing Propositions for a Peace (cf. Ord. of 16 April).

=== May 1644 ===
- 9 May 1644 Ordinance concerning Escheators.
- 9 May 1644 Further Ordinance for the demolition of monuments of Idolatry and Superstition in Churches (cf. Ord. 26 August 1643).
- 9 May 1644 Ordinance empowering the Committee of the Militia of the City of London to send auxiliaries to Sir William Waller and the Earl of Essex.
- 10 May 1644 Ordinance for raising and maintaining Horse and Foot for the garrison of Gloucester, and for the counties of Gloucester, Hereford, Monmouth, Glamorgan, Brecknock and Radnor.
- 13 May 1644 Ordinance for the maintenance of the forces of the Eastern Association under the command of the Earl of Manchester.
- 15 May 1644 Ordinance giving relief from prejudice and inconvenience caused by the stoppage and delay of Writs of Error and ordering that such Writs shall be sealed with the Great Seal.
- 21 May 1644 Ordinance for paying monies to Sir Thomas Middleton for the furtherance of the public service in North Wales.
- 23 May 1644 Ordinance (following the temporary Ordinance of 16 February 1643–4) appointing a Committee of both Houses to join with the Committees and Commissioners of Scotland, for the better managing the affairs of both nations, in accordance with the late Covenant and Treaty.
- 25 May 1644 Ordinance for the better execution of the former Ordinances for the sequestration of the estates of Delinquents and Papists.
- 28 May 1644 Ordinance for the Excise of Hull to be paid to Lord Fairfax for support of the Garrison there.
- 28 May 1644 Ordinance enabling the Solicitor General to perform the duties of the Attorney General during his absence.
- 28 May 1644 Ordinance for repayment to Captain William Edwards the moneys due to him for the service of the State, and for his better enabling to proceed in the said service.

=== June 1644 ===
- 3 June 1644 Ordinance to prevent the embezzlement of Prizes taken by the Fleet and concerning the payment of Prize money.
- 5 June 1644 Ordinance for the repayment of £22,000 to be advanced for the navy.
- 10 June 1644 Ordinance for associating the counties of Pembroke, Caermarthen, and Cardigan.
- 10 June 1644 Ordinance appointing Serjeant Major General Richard Browne to command the forces in the counties of Oxford, Bucks and Berks, for the reduction Oxford.
- 13 June 1644 Ordinance for raising monies for maintenance of the Forces in the county of Salop.
- 15 June 1644 Ordinance continuing for four months the Ordinance of 30 March 1644, for the association of the counties of Kent, Sussex, Surrey and Hampshire. (cf. Ord. of 4th Nov., 1643.)
- 15 June 1644 Ordinance that certain persons within the City of London and the parts adjacent who cannot themselves bear arms are to find substitutes and arm for the Militia of London.
- 18 June 1644 Ordinance empowering the Committee of the Militia of the City of London to send forces to serve under Major General Browne in the counties of Oxon, Bucks and Berks.
- 22 June 1644 Ordinance for the payment of the armies of the Lord General and Sir William Waller.
- 25 June 1644 Ordinance appointing members of Committee in the counties of Oxon, Bucks and Berks to put in execution ordinances for the raising of money and forces in these counties.
- 29 June 1644 Ordinance excluding members of either House of Parliament that have deserted the Parliament and adhered to its enemies.

=== July 1644 ===
- 1 July 1644 Ordinance appointing members of Committees to execute several Ordinances of Parliament in the counties of Wilts, Dorset, Somerset, Devon and Cornwall, the cities of Bristol and the Town and County of Poole.
- 3 July 1644 Ordinance for defending the counties of the Eastern Association by the better regulation of the Trained Bands and by raising new forces of horse and foot.
- 8 July 1644 Ordinance creating new Excise duties upon alum, copperas, hats, silks, stuffs, hops, saffron and starch, &c.
- 10 July 1644 Ordinance (explaining Ordinance of 22 February 1643–4) for taking and receiving the accounts of the Kingdom.
- 10 July 1644 Ordinance to raise £3,000 for the Forces in Lancashire.
- 10 July 1644 Ordinance for settling the Militia for the defence of the county of Leicester.
- 12 July 1644 Ordinance for raising a standing army of 10,000 foot and 3,050 horse in the eastern and southern counties to be ready to march on 20 July and to continue only for two months.
- 15 July 1644 Ordinance for raising forces for the defence of the county of Wilts and the garrison of Malmesbury.
- 15 July 1644 Ordinance for the defence of the Isle of Wight; to continue for four months only.
- 19 July 1644 Ordinance for pressing 1,000 soldiers in London to serve under Major-General Browne, and for levying 500 soldiers in each of the counties of Bucks, Berks, and Oxon.
- 19 July 1644 Ordinance for regulating the proceedings of the Committee of both Kingdoms.
- 20 July 1644 Ordinance for the provision of turf and peat for the cities and suburbs of London and Westminster.

=== August 1644 ===
- 2 August 1644 Ordinance for Captain Richard Swanley to land forces in Wales for the assistance of Major General Langharne.
- 3 August 1644 Ordinance for the disposition of monies from the additional Excise (c.f. Ord. of 8 July 1644) in payment of handicraftsmen and for other purposes.
- 3 August 1644 Ordinance for the better regulation of the Excise of Flesh within the cities of London and Westminster, suburbs and lines of communication.
- 7 August 1644 Ordinance for establishing and maintaining a garrison in the town of Lyme Regis.
- 7 August 1644 Ordinance for the Commissioners of Excise to repay themselves £10,000 advanced to the Lord General.
- 9 August 1644 Ordinance for continuing (until both Houses give a contrary order) the Ordinance of 18th Dec. 1643 with regard to Hertfordshire.
- 10 August 1644 Ordinance securing for four months longer the payment of interest on £10,000 lent by the Merchant Adventurers for the army under Sir William Waller.
- 16 August 1644 Ordinance for the establishment of Martial Law within the Cities of London and Westminster and the lines of communication.
- 19 August 1644 Ordinance for associating the counties of Wilts, Dorset, Somerset, Devon and Cornwall, and the Cities of Bristol and Exeter, and the town and county of Poole, for the defence thereof (cf. Ord. 1 July 1644.)
- 21 August 1644 Ordinance for the Commissioner of Excise to advance £10,000 for the army of Sir William Waller. (cf. Ord. 5 March 1643–4, and 10 August 1644.)
- 4 August 1644 Ordinance for a duty on Herrings to pay the expense of the convoy for protecting the Fishermen from pirates.
- 29 August 1644 Ordinance amending that of 16 August for the establishment of Martial Law.
- 30 August 1644 Ordinance amending that of 30 November (1 December) 1643 by permitting foreign ships to remove their own property from ports in hostility to Parliament, but prohibiting trade with such ports (while permitting it with other ports in the Kingdom.)
- 31 August 1644 Ordinance establishing rules for the Commissioners and Auditors of Excise and others employed in the collection of Excise.

=== September 1644 ===
- 3 September 1644 Ordinance for Mr. Hoyle, a Member of the House of Commons, to be Mayor of York, until an election can be lawfully made.
- 13 September 1644 Ordinance appointing Henry Brooke High Sheriff of Chester, and regulating the administration of justice now obstructed in that county.
- 14 September 1644 Ordinance securing to Nathan Wright, Francis Lenthall, and George Henly, merchants, the sum of £5,000 lent by them for the defence of Plymouth, Poole, and Lyme Regis.
- 23 September 1644 Ordinance increasing import and export duties by one-tenth part for six months for the relief of Plymouth.
- 23 September 1644 Ordinance for raising Horse and Foot for the reduction of the County of Worcester.
- 27 September 1644 Ordinance to moderate the Excise on Aqua Vitae or strong waters.
- 28 September 1644 Ordinance continuing that of 31 August 1644, containing rules for the collection of Excise for one year from 11 September 1644.
- 30 September 1644 Ordinance for raising 1,100 horse for the Earl of Essex.
- 30 September 1644 Ordinance for paying the forces under Sir Thomas Middleton by means of £3,000 given for the repair of St. Paul's.

=== October 1644 ===
- 1 October 1644 Ordinance for the Lord General and all other commanders, to give obedience to the instruction of the Committee of both Kingdoms.
- 2 October 1644 Ordinance for maintaining the Forces in the counties of the Eastern Association under the Earl of Manchester, by a weekly payment in the same counties, for four months from 1 September 1644.
- 2 October 1644 Ordinance for a weekly assessment of the City and of the County of Gloucester.
- 4 October 1644 Ordinance for sending five regiments of Trained Bands and auxiliaries from London to join the Earl of Manchester and Sir William Waller.
- 4 October 1644 Ordinance for assigning certain monies, levied by the Ordinance of 26 March 1644, to Sir William Erle for the provision of a Train of Artillery for the Lord General.
- 4 October 1644 Ordinance for the Ordination of Ministers pro tempore according to the Directory for Ordination, with the rules from the Directory.
- 12 October 1644 Ordinance for the speedy raising of monies in the Cities of London and Westminster and adjacent parts for the maintenance of forces sent for the present expedition.
- 12 October 1644 Ordinance for a weekly assessment in Northamptonshire for six months from the 9th September, 1644.
- 14 October 1644 Ordinance for raising money in the seven counties of the Eastern Association for the regiment of Lieut.-General Cromwell.
- 18 October 1644 Ordinance concerning the Excise at Southampton, ordering that it be entered in the receipts of the Commissioners of Excise at London (cf. Ordinance 28 November 1643, 11 September, and 8 April 1644).
- 18 October 1644 Ordinance for an assessment throughout England and Wales, for the relief of the British Army in Ireland, to continue for twelve months from 1 September 1644.
- 24 October 1644 Ordinance for the Redemption of the Captives at Algiers.
- 24 October 1644 Ordinance forbidding the giving of quarter to any Irishman or Papist born in Ireland who shall be taken in Hostility against the Parliament either upon the Sea or in England and Wales.
- 25 October 1644 Ordinance, amending that of 17 February 1643–4, for the defence of the County of Middlesex, giving additional powers for regulating Trained Bands, raising Forces, etc. To continue in force for six months and no longer.

=== November 1644 ===
- 4 November 1644 Ordinance for the fining and banishment of Edmund Waller.
- 4 November 1644 Ordinance for the speedy constituting of Sir Nathaniel Brent Judge of the Prerogative Court of Canterbury, for the Probate of Wills and granting of Letters of Administration.
- 7 November 1644 Ordinance for the erection of forts against the garrison of Crowland, by the Associated Counties under the Earl of Manchester, along with the County of Northampton.
- 8 November 1644 Ordinance for the due payment of Tithes and other such Duties according to the Laws and Customs of this Realm.
- 14 November 1644 Ordinance for paying £5,000 out of the Excise for the Lord General's army.
- 14 November 1644 Ordinance amending Ordinance of 14 January 1642, and permitting trade with Newcastle and Tynemouth.
- 16 November 1644 Ordinance, to free from all assessments and charges the possessions and goods of the Hospitals of St. Bartholomew, Bridwell, St. Thomas, and Bethlem.
- 26 November 1644 Ordinance for Free Trade with the plantations in New England.
- 26 November 1644 Ordinance to fell timber in Delinquents' Estates in Sussex and Hants for the repair of the fortifications in Plymouth.

=== December 1644 ===
- 2 December 1644 Ordinance for raising £66,666 13s. 4d., by way of Loan, for the better enabling of our Brethren of Scotland for our assistance and defence.
- 3 December 1644 Ordinance for the raising of money to pay the Fortifications and Guards, and for other necessary uses, for the safety of the Cities of London and Westminster and the parts adjacent.
- 5 December 1644 Ordinance for the continuance for one month of the Ordinance for Martial Law within the Cities of London and Westminster, or the Lines of Communication (cf. Ordinance 16 August 1644, and 16 September 1644).
- 6 December 1644 Ordinance continuing for a year from 9 January 1644–5, the Excise of Flesh-Victuals and Salt (cf. Ord. 9 January 1643–4, and 3 August 1644).
- 7 December 1644 Ordinance for payment for the provision of Saltpetre and Ammunition.
- 8 December 1644 Ordinance for the relief of certain widows of officers and soldiers, who are in extreme want.
- 12 December 1644 Ordinance amending that of 7 December for payment for ammunition.
- 13 December 1644 Ordinance continuing for six months the Ordinance of 15 July 1644, for the defence of the Isle of Wight.
- 13 December 1644 Ordinance ordaining certain ministers in the County of Lancaster, and forbidding the preaching of unordained ministers.
- 17 December 1644 Ordinance for a new Duchy Seal of the County Palatine of Lancaster.
- 19 December 1644 Ordinance to observe the Monthly Fast, especially on the day which heretofore was called The Feast of the Nativity of Our Saviour.
- 23 December 1644 Ordinance securing £10,000 to the Merchant Adventurers, payment being delayed six months longer. (cf. Ord. of 10 August 1644).
- 23 December 1644 Ordinance for the appropriation by the Commissioners of Excise of the £10,000, payment of which to the Merchant Adventurers is postponed by the foregoing Ordinance.
- 26 December 1644 Ordinance for bringing in the arrears of the Monthly Assessment, formerly charged upon the Cities of London and Westminster, and all other Parishes and Places within the Line of Communication and County of Middlesex (cf. Ord. 26 March 1644, and 4 October 1644).

== 1645 ==
- 4 January 1644/5 Ordinance for taking away the Book of Common Prayer and putting in Execution the Directory for the Public Worship of God.
- 4 January 1644/5 Ordinance for the Attainder of the William Laud, the Archbishop of Canterbury.
- 7 January 1644/5 Order for paying the Guards employed in the defence of the River Thames.
- 8 January 1644/5 Ordinance (amending the Attainder passed on 4 January) directing the beheading of the Archbishop of Canterbury.
- 13 January 1644/5 Ordinance to sequester Delinquents' Estates in Essex for the benefit of the said county.
- 28 January 1644/5 Ordinance empowering the Commissioners of both Houses to join with the Commissioners of the Parliament of Scotland to treat with the King's Commissioners at Uxbridge.
- 28 January 1644/5 Ordinance to continue up to the 11th December, 1645, the Duty for the relief of the Captives at Algiers, amending Ordinances of 24 October 1644.
- 29 January 1644/5 Ordinance continuing the Ordinance touching the Excise or new Impost up to the 1st April, 1646 (a subsequent order dated 3 February 1644–5, postponed the expiration of the Ordinance till the 11th September, 1646), cf. Ordinance of 31 August 1644.
- 31 January 1644/5 Ordinance for the Commissioners of both Kingdoms, or any ten of them, to treat with the King's Commissioners, amending Ordinance of 28 January.
- 3 February 1644/5 Ordinance for the Commissioners of the Excise to re-imburse themselves £14,000 advanced for the armies of the Lord General.
- 10 February 1644/5 Order for the use of the Seal of the Duchy of Lancaster in accordance with the Ordinance of 17 December 1644, together with the Oath of the Sheriff of Lancaster.
- 17 February 1644/5 Ordinance for raising and maintaining of Forces for the Defence of the Kingdom under Sir Thomas Fairfax, who is constituted and ordained Commander-in-Chief (i.e. Ordinance for the New Model Army.)
- 19 February 1644/5 Ordinance to prevent fraudulent entries of Excisable Commodities and to empower the Commissioners of Excise to punish offenders against the Ordinance of 11 September 1643.
- 20 February 1644/5 Ordinance continuing the Ordinances of July 1642, 21 January 1642–3, and 18 September 1643, for the subsidy of Tonnage and Poundage and a Book of rates, and repealing the Ordinances of 26 August 1642, and 19 January 1642–3, against the importation of Currants. (cf. Ord.)
- 21 February 1644/5 Ordinances for the raising and levying for four months of the monthly sum of £21,000 for the maintenance of the Scottish Army under the Earl of Leven, by a monthly assessment of Ordinances.
- 21 February 1644/5 Ordinance for Samuel Avery, Richard Bateman, Charles Lloyd, Christopher Pack, and Walter Boothby to be Commissioners of the Customs.
- 21 February 1644/5 Ordinance for pressing mariners up to 1 January 1645–6.
- 21 February 1644/5 Ordinance for the Commissioners of the Excise to repay themselves £4,000 advanced for the Lord General's army, and £1,000 advanced for the Earl of Callander's army.
- 21 February 1644/5 Ordinance for raising money in Northamptonshire for the Garrison of Northampton, for six months from the 24th February 1644–5.
- 22 February 1644/5 Order for all officers and soldiers to repair to their colours, upon pain of death, within forty-eight hours after notice of this Ordinance.
- 22 February 1644/5 Ordinance for impressing soldiers for the army of Sir Thomas Fairfax; to continue in force for nine months.
- 28 February 1644/5 Ordinance to empower the Committee of the Militia of London to compel certain persons to find arms and raise horse for the service of the Parliament, and to authorise the Committee to search for Papists; to continue in force for six months. (cf. Ordinance.)
- 3 March 1644/5 Ordinance to raise money by a monthly rate in the County of Essex, for the defence of the county; to continue till 1 December 1645. (cf. Ordinances.)
- 11 March 1644/5 Ordinance empowering Sir Thomas Fairfax to appoint his inferior officers.
- 13 March 1644/5 Order for the printing of the Directory, and forbidding its being reprinted without authorising it.
- 14 March 1644/5 Ordinance for providing draught horses for the carriage of the train of artillery to the army under Sir Thomas Fairfax and for payment of coat and conduct money.
- 15 March 1644/5 Ordinance for continuing and paying the Kentish regiment at Plymouth.
- 15 March 1644/5 Ordinance for the appropriation of one-third part of the customs upon currants to the use of the garrison at Gloucester, in accordance with the Ordinance of 21 February 1644–5.
- 29 March 1645 Ordinance empowering the Committee of the Militia of the City of London to impress men under the Ordinance of 27 February 1644–5.
- 31 March 1645 Ordinance for securing the £80,000 advanced by and under the eight treasurers hereafter named; and for the more orderly receiving and issuing the monies of the taxes levied by the Ordinance of 15 February 1644–5, for the maintenance of the forces under Sir Thomas Fairfax.
- 1 April 1645 Ordinance giving full powers as Commander-in-Chief to Sir Thomas Fairfax. (cf. Ord. 15 February 1644–5.)
- 2 April 1645 Ordinance to abolish a custom of scrambling for cakes on Easter Day in Twickenham Parish Church.
- 3 April 1645 Ordinance for raising monies in the County of Lincoln for the defence of the county, from 1 January 1644–5, to 1 July 1645.
- 3 April 1645 Ordinance discharging members of both Houses from all offices, both military and civil (Self-denying Ordinance).
- 4 April 1645 Ordinance empowering the Committee of the London Militia to impress soldiers and send them to Maidenhead.
- 5 April 1645 Ordinance for an oath to be tendered to those who come from the King's quarters into the protection of the Parliament.
- 11 April 1645 Ordinance to exempt the University of Cambridge from assessments, taxes and charges.
- 12 April 1645 Ordinance for paying the garrisons of Poole and Weymouth for six months out of the Excise.
- 12 April 1645 Ordinance for charging £8,000 upon the Excise for new ships.
- 14 April 1645 Ordinance to prevent frauds upon the Customs by giving the Commissioners power to search for prohibited goods.
- 8 April 1645 Ordinance amending that of 2 August 1644, permitting an allowance out of the Excise on Hampshire for the Portsmouth garrison.
- 19 April 1645 Ordinance to continue for twelve months the Ordinance of 25 October 1644, for the militia of the County of Middlesex.
- 19 April 1645 Ordinance appointing a Committee of the Lords and Commons to execute the duties of the Lord High Admiral of England and of the Lord Warden of the Cinque Ports.
- 23 April 1645 Ordinance for maintaining preaching ministers in the northern parts of the Kingdom out of the respective possessions of the Deans and Chapters of York, Durham and Carlisle.
- 23 April 1645 Ordinance settling Mr. Goodwin in the Vicarage of Watford and Dr. Burges in the Public Lecture of St. Paul's, London.
- 23 April 1645 Ordinance appointing a Committee with powers to execute Martial Law in the County of Kent.
- 24 April 1645 Ordinance (amending that of 17 February 1644–5) for the punishment of impressed soldiers who forsake their colours.
- 26 April 1645 Ordinance prohibiting preaching by laymen (cf Ord.)
- 26 April 1645 Ordinance amending that of 23 December 1644, securing £10,000 to the Merchant Adventurers who have agreed to postpone the repayment for nine months longer.
- 29 April 1645 Ordinance for relieving maimed soldiers out of the monies raised in the counties of the Eastern Association.
- 3 May 1645 Ordinance for a Committee to reside with the Army in Ireland to be continued for eight months.
- 3 May 1645 Ordinance empowering members of the Committee of Both Kingdoms to grant commissions in the army to persons recommended by the Committee of the Western Association.
- 6 May 1645 Ordinance freeing the Vintners (with certain exceptions) from any demand concerning the imposition of forty shillings per tun on wine.
- 6 May 1645 Ordinance to prevent the importation by foreigners of whale oil, fins or gills, commonly called whalebone.
- 7 May 1645 Ordinance for raising money out of Delinquents, Estates for the maintenance of Horse and Foot for the garrison of Gloucester and for the counties of Gloucester, Hereford, Monmouth, Glamorgan, Brecknock, and Radnor.
- 9 May 1645 Ordinance against stealing children, with order for search in vessels and ships, and for the publication of the Ordinance.
- 9 May 1645 Ordinance for envoys to be sent to Flanders to negotiate for the merchant ships stayed there, and to prevent cruisers used against the ships of the Parliament from being protected in Flemish ports.
- 10 May 1645 Ordinance (amending those of 8 July and 3 August 1644) for pay of waggoners, soldiers, and their widows.
- 10 May 1645 Ordinance for the Committee of the three counties of Oxon, Bucks, and Berks to raise money by voluntary subscription for additional forces under Major-General Browne, for the reduction of Oxford.
- 10 May 1645 Ordinance continuing General Cromwell in his command for forty days notwithstanding the Ordinance of 3 April 1645.
- 22 May 1645 Ordinance empowering Treasurers to receive arrears due under the Ordinance of 3 August 1643.
- 24 May 1645 Order for a collection in the Cities of London and Westminster and adjoining parts for the relief of the distressed inhabitants of Taunton.
- 24 May 1645 Ordinance appointing Colonel Massey to command in chief the Forces of the Western Association.
- 26 May 1645 Order for disfranchising the Mayor and others of Newcastle upon Tyne, and putting others in their places.
- 26 May 1645 Ordinance for a monthly assessment in Derbyshire to maintain the forces for the defence of the county; to continue from 1 May to 1 December 1645.
- 30 May 1645 Ordinance for the execution of Martial Law in Plymouth.
- 30 May 1645 Ordinance (continuing for four months that of 15 March 1644–5) for the retention of the Kentish Regiment in Plymouth.
- 4 June 1645 Ordinance amending that of 26 August 1643 for the recovery of ships, &c., from the sea, and protecting the inventors of the method employed
- 5 June 1645 Ordinance for the raising and impressing of men within the Western Association.
- 6 June 1645 Ordinance appointing a Committee for the better regulation of the Excise.
- 7 June 1645 Ordinance continuing for six months the Ordinance of 13 July 1644, for the safety of the Isle of Wight.
- 7 June 1645 Ordinance appointing a Committee to execute Martial Law in Kent; to continue for six months.
- 10 June 1645 Ordinance empowering the Committee for the county of Southampton to put into execution all Ordinances of Parliament for levying money and raising forces for the safety of the county.
- 11 June 1645 Ordinance authorizing Sir Thomas Fairfax to impress men in any place which his army passes through: to continue for one month.
- 12 June 1645 Ordinance for the more speedy collection of monies in arrear, formerly imposed upon the Bill of £400,000, the Ordinance for the Fifty Subsidies, Weekly Assessment, and Weekly Meal, within the City of London, and liberties thereof (cf. Ordinances 4 March 1642, 18 August 1643 and 26 March 1644).
- 13 June 1645 Ordinance empowering the Committee for Scots Affairs at Goldsmiths' Hall to manage the Ordinance of 20 February (?) 1644–5 for the raising of money for the Scottish Army.
- 18 June 1645 Order continuing Lieutenant-General Cromwell's command as Lieutenant-General of the Horse for three months from the end of the forty days granted to him by the Ordinance of 10 May.
- 20 June 1645 Ordinance for raising £31,000 for the Scots Army in accordance with the Ordinance of 20 February 1644–5.
- 20 June 1645 Ordinance for associating the counties of York, Lancaster, Nottingham, Bishopric of Durham, Northumberland, Cumberland and Westmoreland (the Northern Association) and for raising monthly assessments therein.
- 21 June 1645 Ordinance to raise money in Rutlandshire for the defence of the county.
- 26 June 1645 Ordinance continuing for three months from its expiration the Ordinance of 10 June giving power to Sir Thomas Fairfax to press men.
- 27 June 1645 Ordinance to prevent Desertion from Sir Thomas Fairfax's army by the execution of Martial Law upon delinquents.
- 27 June 1645 An additional Ordinance for the better taking and expediting the Account of the whole Kingdom.
- 1 July 1645 Ordinance appointing a Committee of Both Houses to manage the affairs of Ireland.
- 1 July 1645 Ordinance for raising £20,000 for the reduction of Oxford.
- 1 July 1645 Ordinance to put the County of Surrey in a posture of defence by regulating Trained Bands and other forces, and paying such Foot as belong to the garrison of Farnham Castle. (cf., Ord. 27 July 1643.)
- 7 July 1645 Ordinance continuing for twelve months the Ordinance of 28 January 1644–5 for the relief of the captives at Algiers.
- 9 July 1645 Ordinance concerning the Bonds taken for the imposition of one per cent. for the redemption of the captives at Algiers.
- 10 July 1645 Ordinance for raising 500 Horse in the counties of the Eastern Association by sums charged upon the Excise.
- 17 July 1645 Ordinance confirming Sir Henry Vane, jun., in his post as Treasurer of the Navy. (cf. Ord. 8 Aug. 1642, and the Self-denying Ordinance.)
- 18 July 1645 Ordinance for the relief of the counties of Oxon, Bucks, Berks, and Southampton.
- 24 July 1645 Ordinance to collect the arrears of assessment in the county of Middlesex and the cities of London and Westminster and parts adjacent, in accordance with the Ordinance of 4 October 1644 for the provision of a new Train of Artillery,
- 21 July 1645 Ordinance for raising £5,000 out of the Excise for the reduction of Winchester and Basing.
- 28 July 1645 Ordinance appointing Commissioners of Both Houses to go to Scotland to treat and conclude divers matters concerning the peace of Both Kingdoms.
- 29 July 1645 Ordinance appointing Commissioners to take accounts in the northern counties.
- 1 August 1645 Ordinance for the continued assessment of the County of Northampton.
- 2 August 1645 Ordinance for the payment, out of the Excise, of £8,000 to certain English, Scotch, and other Officers, £1,000 for the Train of Artillery, and £4,000 for the reduced Horse and Foot Reformadoes late under the Earl of Essex.
- 5 August 1645 Ordinance to raise 1,000 men under Major General Browne for the reduction of Oxford.
- 6 August 1645 Ordinance to raise £2,800 a month in Lincolnshire till Newark and Belvoir are reduced.
- 12 August 1645 Ordinance for raising money in the Counties of the Eastern Association for the reduction of Newark.
- 12 August 1645 Ordinance continuing Lieutenant General Cromwell in his command for three months from the expiry of the Ordinance of the 18th June.
- 12 August 1645 Ordinance pledging the public faith for the repayment of the monies raised by the Ordinance for the Twentieth Part, and the Twenty and Fifth Part.
- 12 August 1645 Ordinance for the defence of the Isle of Ely.
- 13 August 1645 Ordinance continuing for six months the Ordinance of 15 February 1644–5.
- 15 August 1645 Ordinance empowering the Committee of the London Militia to search for Papists or other persons coming from the King's quarters to London, with the authority given by the Ordinance of the 27th February, 1644–6.
- 15 August 1645 Ordinance continuing for six months the Ordinance of 18 October 1644, for a weekly assessment for the army in Ireland.
- 15 August 1645 Ordinance continuing for four months the Ordinance of 20 February 1644–5, for the raising and levying of the monthly sum of £21,000 for the Scottish army.
- 19 August 1645 Ordinance regulating the election of elders and the membership of the classical, provincial and national assembly.
- 19 August 1645 Ordinance continuing for the next herring season the Ordinance of 26 August 1644, imposing a duty on Herrings for the expense of a convoy to protect the Fishery.
- 23 August 1645 Ordinance for paying £10,000 out of the Excise for maintaining the supernumerary forces of Horse and Foot in Yorkshire.
- 26 August 1645 Ordinance confirming that of 3 January 1644–5, for establishing the Directory of Public Worship with a more effectual method of putting it into execution.
- 26 August 1645 Ordinance to continue for six months the Ordinances of 10 May 1643, and 1 July 1644, for weekly assessments in the counties of the Western Association.
- 28 August 1645 Ordinance for an election of scholars to Eton College.
- 29 August 1645 Ordinance to pay £2,000 out of the Excise for the forces in Lancashire.
- 29 August 1645 Ordinance to raise money in Lancashire and to appoint a Committee for the defence of the county.
- 2 September 1645 Ordinance for paying £50,000 out of the Excise for the army of Sir Thomas Fairfax.
- 3 September 1645 Ordinance to raise monies in the Eastern Association for the maintenance and pay of the garrisons at Newport Pagnell, Bedford, Lynn Regis, and other places in these counties.
- 9 September 1645 Ordinance for raising 500 Horse and 5,000 Dragoons by the Committee of the London Militia.
- 9 September 1645 Ordinance prohibiting the benefit of the fifth part of a Delinquent's estate to any wife or child of a Delinquent who may come from the King's quarters, and to any child of a Delinquent not brought up in the Protestant Faith.
- 11 September 1645 Ordinance appointing Lord Falconberg Comptroller of the Excise of the City of, and William Bond auditor of all Excise and New Impost within the Kingdom.
- 16 September 1645 Ordinance repeating that of 19 February 1644–5, and making other provisions for ensuring the observance of the Excise Ordinance of 16 September 1643.
- 16 September 1645 Ordinance rendering void all warrants and commissions issued in His Majesty's name to Captain George Carteret as Governor of Jersey.
- 19 September 1645 Ordinance (to continue for six months) authorising the Committee for the Western Association to settle difference between the Committees, officers, and soldiers, and to regulate abuses in Wiltshire.
- 23 September 1645 Ordinance to the collection of monies in arrear in the county of Essex, for the payment of the army late under the command of the Earl of Manchester.
- 23 September 1645 Ordinance for the employment for two months of the 800 Horse in Lincolnshire, raised by the Eastern Association.
- 23 September 1645 Ordinance for the gathering of all Arrears in the County of Essex, of the fifth and twentieth parts of men's estates, and the weekly Assessment for raising and maintaining of the army late under the command of the Earl of Manchester.
- 23 September 1645 Ordinance continuing up to 29 September 1646, the Ordinance of 23 September 1644, for raising money for the defence of Plymouth, with an additional provision that currants be imported under the same conditions as the other goods.
- 26 September 1645 Ordinance confirming that of 26 May 1643, for the payment of an annuity of £10,000 to the Earl of Essex, and providing for the payment of arrears of it.
- 27 September 1645 An Ordinance for the further support of the British Army in Ireland (cf. Ord. 18 October 1644).
- 4 October 1645 Ordinance amending and continuing up to 1 January 1645–6 the Ordinance of 19 April 1645 for the Committee of the Admiralty.
- 4 October 1645 Ordinance that the accounts of the Excise shall determine on the 29th September, 1645, and be thereafter taken quarterly, on the 25th December, 25 March, 24 June, and 20 September.
- 8 October 1645 Ordinance to settle £8,000 per annum on the Prince Elector Palatine out of the King's revenues and Delinquents' Estates.
- 13 October 1645 Ordinance for raising by way of loan £40,000 for the payment of the army of Sir Thomas Fairfax.
- 20 October 1645 Ordinance concerning Church Government, with rules and directions concerning suspension from the Sacrament of the Lord's Supper in cases of ignorance and scandal: with the names of the Tryers of the Ability of Elders in the Province of London.
- 23 October 1645 Ordinance for advancing money for the payment of waggoners in the City Brigades out of the Excise.
- 28 October 1645 Ordinance for the better security and government of the City of Bristol.
- 28 October 1645 Ordinance (to continue for 12 months) for the relief of Leicester after its being plundered by the King's forces.
- 1 November 1645 Ordinance for composition for Wardships and Liveries, and for signing of Bills and passing them under the Great Seal, without the King's Signature.
- 1 November 1645 Ordinance to settle the Magistracy of Bristol.
- 4 November 1645 Ordinance explaining that of 22 November 1643, for the use of the Excise of Northampton for the defence of the town (cf Ordinance 11 September 1643).
- 4 November 1645 Ordinance to continue for 12 months for the Ordination of Ministers (the Ordinance of 2 October 1644).
- 13 November 1645 Ordinance authorising the treatment as spies, by Martial Law, of all who come from the King's Quarters and do not report themselves within ten days.
- 17 November 1645 Ordinance amending that of 22 October 1645, for the payment of waggoners.
- 18 November 1645 Ordinance appointing a Committee of the Lords and Commons for the disposal of the revenues of the College and Collegiate Church of Westminster.
- 24 November 1645 Ordinance disabling the judges who have deserted their places.
- 24 November 1645 Ordinance for an additional Excise or New Impost upon lead, gold, silver, glass, oil, and woollen cloth, etc., for the payment of Artificers for arms and ammunition.
- 1 December 1645 Ordinance for an assessment of the counties of the Eastern Association for the repayment of monies disbursed by persons in these counties.
- 3 December 1645 Ordinance to establish a garrison at Bristol under Major General Skippon, and to authorise him to execute Martial Law within the city and garrison.
- 3 December 1645 Ordinance to raise by way of loan £31,000 for the payment of the Scots Army (cf. Ord. 20 June 1645 ).
- 4 December 1645 Ordinance for pensions to the servants of the King's children.
- 6 December 1645 Ordinance, continuing for six months the Ordinance of 7 June 1645, for the execution of Martial Law in Kent.
- 19 December 1645 Ordinance for the maintenance of preaching ministers in the Northern counties.
- 29 December 1645 Ordinance for the payment of £30,000 out of the Excise for the army of Sir Thomas Fairfax.
- 30 December 1645 Ordinance, amending that of 17 November 1645, for the payment of the waggoners of the City Brigade.

== 1646 ==
=== January 1646 ===
- 7 January 1645/6 Ordinance continuing until further Order that of 15 September 1642, for the appointment of Commissioners for the Navy.
- 7 January 1645/6 Ordinance making parochial the precinct of Covent Garden (amended 2 February).
- 15 January 1645/6 Ordinance continuing for nine months the Ordinance of 28 March 1645, appointing a Committee of Lords and Commons and Treasurers at War.
- 15 January 1645/6 Ordinance (to continue for nine months) to punish impressed men who have deserted their colours.
- 16 January 1645/6 Ordinance empowering Colonel Thomas Morgan to execute Martial Law at Gloucester.
- 19 January 1645/6 Ordinance enabling the Committee of the Militia for the City of London to press soldiers during the next six months.
- 19 January 1645/6 Ordinance giving power to the Committee of Militia for the City of London to appoint SubCommittee for the better execution of various powers entrusted to them by this and previous ordinances.
- 26 January 1645/6 Ordinance continuing Lieutenant General Cromwell in his command for six months.
- 29 January 1645/6 Ordinance amending that of 30 November 1643, with fresh instructions for the Committee of the Admiralty and Cinque Ports regarding reprisals.
- 31 January 1645/6 Ordinance amending Covent Garden Ordinance.

=== February 1646 ===
- 2 February 1645/6 Ordinance to raise £30,000 by way of loan in the City in accordance with the method adopted in the Ordinance of 1 July 1645.
- 7 February 1645/6 Ordinance continuing for one year that of 21 February 1644–5, for impressing mariners, sailors and others for the navy.
- 7 February 1645/6 Ordinance enabling saltpetre men to make gunpowder.
- 12 February 1645/6 Order for judges to go on circuit as hath been accustomed.
- 13 February 1645/6 Ordinance for the regulation of preaching in the University of Cambridge, and for the government of Trinity and other colleges.
- 14 February 1645/6 Ordinance for payment of £3,000 out of the Excise to widows of officers, etc., of the army of the Earl of Essex.
- 18 February 1645/6 Ordinance appointing Sir George Vane High Sheriff of the County Palatine of Durham and for regulating the arrangement for justice therein.
- 24 February 1645/6 Ordinance for Removal of Court of Wards.
- 24 February 1645/6 Ordinance continuing till the 20th March the Ordinance for the Northern Association with the exception of clauses dealing with the Crown revenues.
- 28 February 1645/6 Ordinance for payment out of the Excise of £20,000 for the forces raised by the Eastern Association for the siege of Newark.

=== March 1646 ===
- 2 March 1645/6 Ordinance continuing for six months that of 3 May 1645, for the appointment of Commissioners in Ulster.
- 4 March 1645/6 Order for compensation to officers of the Court of Wards and Liveries in view of its abolition.
- 4 March 1645/6 Ordinance empowering the Governor of Henley and Reading to execute Martial Law.
- 9 March 1645/6 Ordinance to continue for a year from the 30th April, 1646, the Ordinance of 18 October 1644, for a weekly assessment for the British armies in Ireland (cf. Ordinance 15 August 1645).
- 14 March 1645/6 Ordinance for keeping scandalous persons from the Sacrament of the Lord's Supper, for the choice of elders, and for supplying defects in former Ordinances concerning church government.
- 19 March 1645/6 Ordinance appointing Commissioners for the Heralds' Office, to prevent abuses and offences.
- 19 March 1645/6 Ordinance appointing for six months Commissioners for the Great Seal. (cf. Ord.)
- 19 March 1645/6 Ordinance for the payment of £20,000 out of the Excise for the forces of the Western Association under Colonel Massey.
- 20 March 1645/6 Ordinance for the payment of £10,000 out of the Excise for the forces designed for North Wales.
- 21 March 1645/6 Order to continue the Ordinance of October 2, 1643, appointing the Earl of Warwick Admiral and Governor of the foreign plantations, and adding commissioners to those names in the Ordinance.
- 21 March 1645/6 Ordinance for the payment of £6,000 out of the Excise for the forces that are to pursue Sir Jacob Ashley and for those besieging Lichfield.
- 28 March 1646 Ordinance to raise £6,000 by loan for the forces in Ireland.
- 28 March 1646 Ordinance for the maintenance of preaching ministers in the City and County of Hereford.

=== April 1646 ===
- 1 April 1646 Order that all Papists and others who have borne arms against the Parliament should by 3 April depart from the Cities of London and Westminster and the Lines of Communication.
- 3 April 1646 Ordinance for the speedy establishment of a court martial within the Cities of London and Westminster and the Lines of Communication.
- 9 April 1646 Ordinance to raise a monthly sum in the County of Derby for the payment of the Forces and other necessary defences for the public service; to continue from 1 December 1645 to 1 August 1646, if the war should last so long.
- 16 April 1646 Ordinance to erect a French or Walloon church in the town and port of Dover.
- 16 April 1646 Ordinance continuing the Army Ordinance of 15 February 1644–5, from 1 June 1646 to 1 October 1646 (cf. Ord. 13 August 1645).
- 22 April 1646 Ordinance to reserve for the Navy timber felled for wharfing or for any public building.
- 28 April 1646 Ordinance for the administration of the Excise from the expiry of the existing Ordinance until the 29th September, 1648.

=== May 1646 ===
- 2 May 1646 Ordinance for maintenance of ministers.
- 5 May 1646 Order for examining the accounts of all officers who served under Lord Fairfax.
- 7 May 1646 Ordinance continuing for an additional month and amending the Ordinance of 1 April for the removal of Papists and others beyond the Lines of Communication.
- 15 May 1646 Ordinance for raising £10,000 by loans on the Excise for the Army in Ireland.
- 23 May 1646 Ordinance for the raising and advancing of money for the war in Ireland in accordance with the Ordinances of 18 October 1644, 15 August 1645, and 9 March 1645–6.

=== June 1646 ===
- 5 June 1646 Ordinance (to continue for three years) amending the Ordinances of 20 October 1645, and 14 March 1645–6, for the exclusion of improper persons from the Sacrament and for the duties of elders.
- 12 June 1646 Ordinance appointing judges to go the Circuits.
- 17 June 1646 Ordinance concerning the Assizes at Lancaster.
- 27 June 1646 Ordinance for the establishment of a garrison at Kingston-upon-Hull, and for its pay, with articles for its observance.

=== July 1646 ===
- 3 July 1646 Ordinance discharging the Commissioners of Excise for the receipts of the year 11 September 1643, to 11 September 1644, and indemnifying them for acts done in the course of collection.
- 10 July 1646 Ordinance extending to captives in Sally, South Barbary, or any other place, the Ordinance of 7 July 1645, for captives in Algiers and Tunis.
- 11 July 1646 Ordinance to expel from the Cities of London and Westminster, and from within the Lines of Communication, Papists and Irish that have adhered to the enemy.
- 22 July 1646 Ordinance for £20,000 out of the Excise for the maintenance of the army in Ireland.

=== August 1646 ===
- 4 August 1646 Ordinance continuing till 31 August the Ordinance of 3 December 1645, for the garrison of Bristol.
- 4 August 1646 Ordinance continuing for one month the Ordinance for the pay of the Forces of Gloucester, Monmouth, Glamorgan, Brecon and Radnor.
- 6 August 1646 Ordinance to disband the garrisons of Newport Pagnell, Cambridge, Huntingdon and Bedford, to provide men for the Forces in Ireland; to raise money for these Forces; and to empower the Committee or the Eastern Association to put the Ordinance into execution.
- 6 August 1646 Ordinance amending that of 24 November 1645, for an additional Excise for the payment of Artificers and others.
- 13 August 1646 Ordinance for disbanding the garrisons in Shropshire, except Shrewsbury and Ludlow, and the forces of the county, except 400 Foot and 60 Horse, besides officers.
- 13 August 1646 Ordinance continuing for three months from 1 June 1646, the Ordinance for the pay of the Eastern Association.
- 20 August 1646 Ordinance amending that of 20 March 1645–6, for the payment of £10,000 to the Forces in North Wales.
- 28 August 1646 Ordinance for the ordination of ministers by the classical Presbyteries within their respective bounds.

=== September 1646 ===
- 23 September 1646 Ordinance for a moiety of one half of the Western Excise to be employed for four months in the payment of the garrisons and forces in the counties of the Western Association.
- 23 September 1646 Ordinance for a full moiety of the Northern Excise to be employed for four months for the payment of the English garrisons and forces in the counties of the Northern Association.
- 28 September 1646 Ordinance for making a separate parish of the Church of Holland (Upholland) in the county of Lancaster.

=== October 1646 ===
- 1 October 1646 Ordinance for the future Government and administration of the City of Chester and for the payment of preaching ministers therein.
- 9 October 1646 Ordinance for the abolishing of Archbishops and Bishops in England and Wales and for settling their lands and possessions upon Trustees for the use of the Commonwealth.
- 13 October 1646 Ordinance for securing £200,000 upon the credit of Bishops' lands, &c., for the security of such as shall lend money for the present service of the State.
- 30 October 1646 Ordinance to prevent from sitting in Parliament peers created since 30 May 1642, and to annul all honours and titles granted since that time.
- 31 October 1646 Ordinance appointing the Speakers of both Houses Commissioners of the Great Seal for 20 days after the expiry of Michaelmas Term; with the form of the Commission for hearing causes in Chancery (continued for 20 days on 16 December).

=== November 1646 ===
- 3 November 1646 Ordinance continuing till the 1st Jan., 1646–7, the Ordinance of 28 March 1645, for the Committee and Treasurers at War. (cf. Ord. 15 Jan., 1645–6)
- 10 November 1646 Ordinance for the payment, every six months, of £25,000 out of the Excise for the army in Ireland.
- 13 November 1646 Ordinance continuing from the 11th Dec., 1646, the Ordinance of 7 July 1645, to the 11th Dec., 1647, for the relief of captives at Algiers &c.
- 17 November 1646 Ordinance for the Settling of the land of the Bishops in accordance with the Ordinance of 9 October 1646.
- 30 November 1646 Ordinance for the explanation and better execution of the Ordinance of 17 November 1646, for the sale of Bishops' lands.

=== December 1646 ===
- 2 December 1646 Ordinance for the better observance of the Monthly Fast.
- 8 December 1646 Ordinance to prevent the Committee of Sequestration for the county of Oxon from seizing any books, mathematical instruments, &c., necessary for the studies of the University.
- 10 December 1646 Ordinance enjoining the Treasurers for the sale of Bishops' lands to send £200,000 for the payment of the Scots.
- 10 December 1646 Ordinance to revive the Committee of the Lords and Commons for the Army.
- 14 December 1646 Ordinance to justify the proceedings of Parliament.
- 14 December 1646 Ordinance confirming the treaties of 29 November 1643, and 6 August 1642, between the Kingdoms of England and Scotland.
- 14 December 1646 Ordinance to annul the Cessation of Arms in Ireland and all grants of land, &c., honours and titles since the said Cessation made 15 December 1643.
- 22 December 1646 Ordinance continuing for four months more the Ordinance for the maintenance of Water Guards on the Thames, made on the 7th January, 1644–5, and continued on the 11th September, 1645.
- 24 December 1646 Ordinance for the alteration and explanation of the Oath to be taken by the surveyor of the Bishops' lands, and for the better execution of the former Ordinances.

== 1647 ==
- 2 January 1646/7 Ordinance continuing till 1 January 1647–8, the Ordinance of 7 February 1645–6, for impressing mariners for the fleet.
- 13 January 1646/7 Ordinance concerning the payment of £50,000 of the last £200,000 to be paid to the Scots.
- 23 January 1646/7 Ordinance creating the Speakers of the two Houses Commissioners for the Great Seal until ten days after the end of Hilary Term.
- 23 January 1646/7 Ordinance granting privileges for the encouragement of Adventurers to plantations in Virginia, Bermudas, Barbados, and other places of America.
- 4 February 1646/7 Ordinance for a Day of Humiliation on the 10th March on account of the growth of Errors, Heresy and Profaneness.
- 8 February 1646/7 Ordinance empowering the Commissioners at Goldsmiths' Hall to settle sequestrations and compound with Delinquents.
- 15 February 1646/7 Ordinance to grant Archbishop Bancroft's books to the University of Cambridge.
- 20 February 1646/7 Ordinance for the preservation of Game.
- 22 February 1646/7 Ordinance concerning the Excise, with additional instructions for the better regulation of the same.
- 5 March 1646/7 Ordinance for the explanation and better execution of the former Ordinances for the sale of Bishops' Lands (cf. Ord., 16 November 1646).
- 5 March 1646/7 Ordinance to lessen the number of Trustees for the sale of Bishops' Lands.
- 13 March 1646/7 Ordinance continuing, from 26 March 1647, to 26 March 1648, the Ordinances for Tunnage and Poundage dated 1 July 1642, and 21 February 1643/4, together with the Book of Rates.
- 24 March 1646/7 Ordinance to give to the University of Cambridge books added to Archbishop Bancroft's Library.
- 16 April 1647 Ordinance to settle the Militia of London.
- 1 May 1647 Ordinance for the payment of a portion of arrears to the Scots Officers.
- 1 May 1647 Ordinance for the Visitation and Reformation of the University of Oxford and the several Colleges and Halls therein.
- 4 May 1647 Ordinance appointing a Committee for the London Militia in accordance with the Ordinance of 16 April 1647.
- 11 May 1647 Ordinance continuing from 11 December 1647, to 11 December 1648, the Ordinance of 13 November 1646, for the relief of captives at Algiers.
- 13 May 1647 Ordinance giving security to the lenders of £200,000 for the service of this Kingdom and of Ireland.
- 18 May 1647 Ordinance to secure the repayment of monies raised within the Tower Hamlets under Ordinances of 20 July 1643, and 28 November 1643.
- 21 May 1647 Ordinance granting indemnity to all who have acted by sea or land by authority or for the benefit of Parliament.
- 21 May 1647 Ordinance continuing for six months the Committee of Lords and Commons for the Admiralty and the Cinque Ports.
- 25 May 1647 Ordinance for allowing interest to some Scots Officers for their arrears.
- 28 May 1647 Ordinance for the relief of maimed soldiers and for the widows and orphans of such as have died in the service of Parliament during the late wars.
- 28 May 1647 Ordinances for taking the accounts of the soldiery of the whole kingdom, with a Declaration and Instructions regarding the same.
- 3 June 1647 Ordinance for raising and securing £42,000 for the payment of the Guards of the City of London, for repayment of voluntary contributions by poor persons, and for explanation of the Ordinance of 13 May to raise £200,000 for the service of this Kingdom and of Ireland.
- 5 June 1647 Ordinance repealing the Ordinance of September, 1644, for the County Palatine of Chester, with the exception of the clause appointing to the office of Sheriff.
- 7 June 1647 Additional Ordinance for the more full indemnity of the officers and soldiers who have acted by authority and for the service of the Parliament (cf. Ord. May 21, 1647 ).
- 8 June 1647 Ordinance for the abolition of Holy Days and the establishment of Days of Recreation in lieu of them.
- 11 June 1647 Ordinance repealing the Excise on Flesh and Salt after the 24 June instant.
- 11 June 1647 Ordinance allowing scholars and apprentices to have Days of Recreation instead of Holy Days.
- 11 June 1647 Ordinance enabling the Committee of Militia of the City of London to search for arms and to raise Horse.
- 11 June 1647 Ordinance appointing a Committee of Safety to raise Forces for the Defence of the Parliament: to continue in force for one month.
- 16 June 1647 Order for re-imbursing out of the Excise £27,000 paid to officers by the Treasurers at Weavers' Hall.
- 16 June 1647 Order for Auditors to superintend the payment of money to the officers.
- 19 June 1647 Ordinance appointing additional Treasurers at Weavers' Hall for issuing money to soldiers in accordance with the Ordinances of 16 June.
- 19 June 1647 Ordinance for an Indemnity for officers and soldiers who have left their colours in accordance with the orders of Parliament.
- 23 June 1647 Ordinance for a monthly assessment for the maintenance of Forces in this Kingdom and in Ireland.
- 26 June 1647 Ordinance giving the Commissioners appointed to reside with the Army power to treat with the General.
- 26 June 1647 Order discharging any Forces listed by any Order of the Committee of Lords and Commons and the Committee of the Militia, or of the Committee of Safety.
- 28 June 1647 Additional Ordinance for Days of Recreation instead of Holy Days, amending Ord. of 11 June 1647.
- 3 July 1647 Ordinance for a month's pay of the Forces of the Northern Association.
- 9 July 1647 Ordinance continuing from 14 July to 14 August the Ordinance of 12 December 1646, for the Departure of Delinquents and Malignants from within the Lines of Communication.
- 9 July 1647 Ordinance for men who are or profess to be disbanded soldiers to depart from the Cities of London and Westminster, and from within the Lines of Communication by the 15th July.
- 10 July 1647 Ordinance to empower the Committee of Militia of the City of London to search for Papists and Malignants, to raise Horse, and to exercise Discipline in accordance with the Ordinance of 2 May 1643 (cf. Ordinance 11 June 1647 ).
- 21 July 1847 Ordinance for disbanding the Forces of Horse and Foot that came off from the Army and are now in the adjacent Counties near and about London.
- 22 July 1647 Ordinance continuing for ten months from 1 January last the Ordinances of 28 March 1645 and 15 January 1645–6, for the Committee for the Army and Treasurers at War.
- 23 July 1647 Ordinance for the disposal of Fines for non-payment of Excise since 11 June 1645, for relief of maimed soldiers and of soldiers' widows
- 23 July 1647 Ordinance to settle and constitute the Militia of the City of London.
- 24 July 1647 Declaration creating it High Treason to sign the Petition to the Lord Mayor, Aldermen, and Commons of the City of London.
- 26 July 1647 Ordinance repealing the Ordinance of the 23rd July instant for the Militia of the City of London, and enforcing that of 4 May 1647.
- 26 July 1647 Ordinance repealing the Declaration of 24 July instant against the City Petitioners.
- 31 July 1647 Ordinance amending that of 10 July, and giving increased powers to the Committee for the Militia of the City of London to punish deserters, and to elect a Major-General or any other officer for Forces raised within the City.
- 31 July 1647 Ordinance for the City Militia to raise Horse.
- 1 August 1647 Ordinance for the Trinity House to raise mariners for the defence of the Kingdom.
- 3 August 1647 Ordinance for a collection for distressed Irish Protestants resident in or near Barnstable since the 25 March 1647.
- 3 August 1647 Ordinance creating John, Lord Hunsden, and Henry Pelham, Esq., the new Speakers of the two Houses, Commissioners of the Great Seal for ten days, and voiding the powers confirmed on the former Speakers.
- 3 August 1647 Ordinance for a collection for the relief of Chester, which is visited with the plague of Pestilence.
- 3 August 1647 Ordinance restoring the Earl of Pembroke to the Chancellorship of the University of Oxford.
- 3 August 1647 Ordinance to continue till 1 September 1647, empowering the Committee of Safety and the Committee of the Militia of the City of London to disarm persons disaffected to the safety and defence of the Parliament and City.
- 6 August 1647 Ordinance appointing Sir Thomas Fairfax Constable of the Tower for one year, with power to appoint a Lieutenant.
- 9 August 1647 Ordinance amending that of 8 November 1644, for the true payment of tithes to continue till 1 November 1648.
- 10 August 1647 Ordinance amending that of 28 May 1647, for the relief of maimed soldiers and marines, and widows and orphans of soldiers and marines
- 10 August 1647 Ordinance continuing Edward, Earl of Manchester, and William Lenthall, Esq., Speakers of the two Houses, as Commissioners of the Great Seal for one month.
- 10 August 1647 Ordinance for £20,000 out of the Excise for the war in Ireland.
- 20 August 1647 Ordinance for annulling all Votes, Orders and Ordinances, passed in one of both Houses, since the Force on both Houses, 26th July until 6th August, 1647.
- 23 August 1647 Ordinance for keeping in godly ministers, placed in Livings by authority of Parliament.
- 23 August 1647 Ordinance amending that of 16 November 1646, for the sale of Bishops' Lands, and expediting the conveyance thereof.
- 23 August 1647 Ordinance for a collection in view of the plague at Chester.
- 26 August 1647 Ordinance for the visitation of the University of Oxford.
- 28 August 1647 Ordinance for a general collection for the relief of poor Irish Protestants.
- 28 August 1647 Declaration and ordinance re-establishing the Excise Duty upon all Excise commodities except Flesh and Salt.
- 2 September 1647 Ordinance to settle the Militia of the City of London.
- 2 September 1647 Ordinance for a seal for the counties of Brecknock, Radnor and Glamorganshire.
- 2 September 1647 Ordinance to demolish the Lines of Communication and Forts about London.
- 6 September 1647 Ordinance for calling in clipt money and forbidding its circulation.
- 9 September 1647 Ordinance to prevent anyone who has borne arms against the Parliament from holding office of any kind.
- 9 September 1647 Ordinance to settle the Militia of Southwark.
- 9 September 1647 Ordinance to settle the Militia of Westminster and parts adjacent, within the County of Middlesex.
- 16 September 1647 Ordinance to bring in the remainder of Delinquents' Fines.
- 21 September 1647 Ordinance for Payment of Arrears due to the late Court of Wards.
- 21 September 1647 Ordinance for the payment of Fee-farm rents due to the Crown from members of either House, in default of which the Ordinance of 21 September 1643, shall be put into execution.
- 22 September 1647 Ordinance for the delivery of sequestered Books, Evidences, Records, and Writings.
- 23 September 1647 Ordinance for Members of both Houses to be a Committee for the Army to dispose of the monthly sum of £60,000 raised in accordance with the Ordinance of 23 June 1647; and appointing Treasurers at War.
- 24 September 1647 Ordinance for the security of purchases of Bishops' Lands.
- 30 September 1647 Ordinance amending those of 23 June and 23 September 1647, decreeing £30,000 to the Treasurers at War, and granting them powers and allowances.
- 30 September 1647 Ordinance for the regulation of printing and to prevent the issue of scandalous pamphlets.
- 4 October 1647 Ordinance for disabling Delinquents to bear office or to have any voice in the election of any.
- 7 October 1647 Ordinance to give security to the Treasurers at War for £32,000 borrowed for the service of the Kingdoms of England and Ireland.
- 12 October 1647 Ordinance to bring in arrears of the assessments for the army of Sir Thomas Fairfax in accordance with the Ordinances of 15 February 1644–5, and 23 September 1647.
- 22 October 1647 Ordinance for the suppression of Stage Plays and Interludes within the Cities of London and Westminster and the Counties of Middlesex and Surrey.
- 22 October 1647 Ordinance for settling the Mayor, Sheriff, and other officers for the City of Chester.
- 2 November 1647 Ordinance for Colonel George Monk to execute Martial Law in Ulster.
- 13 November 1647 Ordinance amending that of 14 July 1643, and fixing a limit of time for the payment by Adventurers for Lands in Ireland.
- 19 November 1647 Ordinance that £20,000 raised for the Eastern Association and charged upon the Excise (by Ordinance of 28 February 1645–6) be borrowed by the Treasurers at War for the present supply of the Army. Amended by Ordinance of 1 December 1647, and 8 December 1647
- 2 December 1647 Ordinance amending that of 16 November 1646, and removing obstructions in the sale of Bishops' Lands.
- 8 December 1647 Ordinance continuing the Commissioners of the Great Seal for twenty days after the end of next term from the expiry of the time it is now continued for; and continuing for a similar period the Commission for hearing Causes in Chancery.
- 16 December 1647 Ordinance for establishing the subsidy of Tunnage and Poundage and the Book of Rates from the 26th March, 1648, to 26 March 1651.
- 17 December 1647 Ordinance for the relief and employment of the poor, and the punishment of vagrants and other disorderly persons.
- 17 December 1647 Ordinance putting out of the Cities of London and Westminster and the late Lines of Communication all Papists and others who have borne arms against the Parliament.
- 17 December 1647 Ordinance to prevent the election to offices in the City of men concerned in the Engagement entitled The Agreement of the People.
- 17 December 1647 Ordinance to repay the salaries and charges of the Committee and Sub-Committees for the Accounts, and their officers.
- 17 December 1647 Ordinance adding certain Lords to the Committee of the Navy and Customs.
- 24 December 1647 Ordinances for the disbanding of all supernumerary Forces within this Kingdom under the command of Sir Thomas Fairfax:—
  - Ordinance that no officer or soldier shall have free Quarter after the 15th January, 1647/8.
  - Ordinance for the payment of the soldiery out of the moiety of the Receipts of Excise.
  - Ordinance for the payment of the soldiery out of Delinquents' Estates.
  - Ordinance for the payment of the soldiery out of the remaining part of the Bishops' lands.
  - Ordinance for charging £600,000 upon the Securities in the three foregoing Ordinances.
  - Ordinance for taking the accounts of officers and soldiers and securing their arrears, with reductions for Free Quarter.
  - Ordinance for the disbanding of all supernumerary Forces.
- 24 December 1647 Ordinance for the several Commissions in the respective Counties to make a collection for the monthly assessment of £60,000.
- 24 December 1647 Ordinance giving power to the Committee of Indemnity to put in execution the Ordinances concerning the freedom of Apprentices who have served the Parliament.
- 24 December 1647 Ordinance amending those of 28 May and 10 August 1647, for the more effectual relief of maimed soldiers.
- 25 December 1647 Ordinance appointing Commissioners of Customs in accordance with the Ordinance for Tonnage and Poundage of 16 December 1647.
- 25 December 1647 Ordinance for the Commissioners of Customs to reimburse themselves money which they have advanced and shall advance for the use of the State.

== 1648 ==
- 3 January 1647/8 Ordinance for raising £50,000 for Ireland, and securing it by several Delinquents' Estates (of Ordinance 13 May 1647).
- 8 January 1647/8 Ordinance for constituting for two years a Committee of the Militia within the Hamlets of the Tower of London.
- 19 January 1647/8 Ordinance to prevent the transportation out of this Kingdom of England, Ireland and Wales, of all Wool, Woollen Yarn, Wool fells, Fuller Earth, Clay, etc.
- 19 January 1647/8 Ordinance to prevent the exportation of Wool from Ireland except to England and Wales.
- 20 January 1647/8 Ordinance to appoint a Committee to execute the Ordinances of Indemnity in Kent.
- 29 January 1647/8 Ordinance for the speedy dividing and settling the several Counties of this Kingdom into distinct classical Presbyteries; and to constitute congregational Elderships; in accordance with the Ordinance of 19 August 1645.
- 29 January 1647/8 Ordinance amending those of 23 June and 9 September 1647, and enlarging the powers of the Committee of the Westminster Militia.
- 9 February 1647/8 Ordinance for repairing Churches and paying of Church Duties within the Kingdom of England and Wales.
- 11 February 1647/8 Ordinance for the suppression of Stage Plays and Interludes with the penalties prescribed for actors and spectators.
- 16 February 1647/8 Ordinance for the raising of £20,000 a month for the relief of Ireland.
- 22 February 1647/8 Ordinance for re-imbursing £10,000 to the Commissioners of Excise, advanced by them for the Navy.
- 22 February 1647/8 Ordinance to secure £20,000 to the Committee of the Eastern Association, and for borrowing it for the use of the Navy.
- 24 February 1647/8 Ordinance explaining the Ordinance for the Weekly Assessment.
- 17 March 1647/8 Additional Ordinance to remove obstructions in the sale of Bishops' lands.
- 17 March 1647/8 Ordinance appointing Commissioners for the Great Seal.
- 17 March 1647/8 Ordinance amending that of 7 October 1645, for raising £8,000 per annum for the Elector Palatine.
- 17 March 1647/8 Ordinance for raising monies for the maintenance of the Forces under Sir Thomas Fairfax.
- 23 March 1647/8 Additional Ordinance amending that of 23 September 1647, for the sale of Bishops' lands.
- 3 April 1648 Ordinance appointing Treasurers for the monthly sum of £20,000 for the relief of Ireland, in accordance with the Ordinance of 16 February 1647/8.
- 4 April 1648 Ordinance for the payment of Tithes in London, amending those of 8 November 1644, and 9 August 1647.
- 4 April 1648 Ordinance amending those of 21 May and 7 June 1647, for the indemnity of the Committee and Forces for the County of Kent.
- 12 April 1648 Ordinance for settling the jurisdiction of the Court of Admiralty.
- 14 April 1648 Ordinance to give power to the Trustees for the sale of Bishops' lands to convey lands to the contractors named in the Ordinances for the said sale, in lieu of their salaries.
- 14 April 1648 Ordinance for settling and appointing a Committee for the Burgh of Southwark.
- 19 April 1648 Ordinance for the preservation of Timber in the Forest of Dean.
- 22 April 1648 Ordinance amending those of 24 December 1647, for further ascertaining the arrears of the soldiery upon their Debentures, and giving security to purchaser thereof.
- 24 April 1648 Ordinance amending those of 15 February 1644–5, and 13 August 1645, and others for bringing in arrears of the Assessments for the Army within the City of London and Liberties thereof.
- 24 April 1648 Ordinance to prevent soldiers from taking Free Quarter.
- 24 April 1648 Ordinance for raising £6,000 for the 400 soldiers added to the forces already in the Tower of London.
- 24 April 1648 Ordinance amending those of 15 March 1647–8, and 23 September 1647, for the continuance of the Committee of the Army and Treasurers at War.
- 2 May 1648 Ordinance for the punishment of Blasphemies and Heresies, with a list of penalties.
- 12 May 1648 Ordinance to settle the Militia of the Counties of Gloucester, Monmouth, Brecon and Glamorgan, and to raise forces to suppress rebellion therein.
- 18 May 1648 Ordinance to settle the Militia of the City of London.
- 20 May 1648 Declaration and Ordinance regarding tumultuous assemblies under the pretence of presenting petitions.
- 23 May 1648 Ordinance for settling the Militia of the County of Hereford.
- 23 May 1648 Ordinance that all Malignants and Papists shall depart the Cities of London and Westminster and the late Lines of Communication within two days; the Ordinance to continue for six months.
- 23 May 1648 Ordinance for settling the Militia in the Northern Counties.
- 27 May 1648 Ordinance enabling the Committee for the University of Oxford to send for convicted Malignants, and to destroy superstitious relics.
- 29 May 1648 Ordinance to make Robert, Earl of Warwick, Lord High Admiral of England.
- 30 May 1648 Ordinance for the more effectual bringing in the arrears of the Assessments of the City of London and the Liberties thereof, for the maintenance of the Forces; amending Ordinances of 15 February 1644–5, etc.
- 5 June 1648 Ordinance additional to that of 23 January 1647–8, for raising £50,000 for the relief of Ireland.
- 5 June 1648 Ordinance to raise a Troop of Horse in Lincolnshire for the defence of the County.
- 7 June 1648 Ordinance to settle the Militia of Cornwall.
- 7 June 1648 Ordinance to settle the Militia of Devon.
- 16 June 1648 Ordinance for the purchase of Arms and Ammunition by the Treasurers at War.
- 16 June 1648 Ordinance amending that of 23 May 1648, for the expulsion of Papists, Officers and Soldiers of Fortune, and Delinquents from the Cities of London and Westminster and the late Lines of Communication.
- 20 June 1648 Ordinance confirming the Articles for the Surrender of Oxford.
- 22 June 1648 Ordinance for settling the Militia in the City and County of the City of Bristol.
- 3 July 1648 Ordinance for settling the Militia of the County of Lincoln.
- 10 July 1648 Ordinance amending those of 17 July 1647, 20 March 1647–8, 23 June 1647, and 24 December 1647, for raising money in Essex for the Forces there.
- 10 July 1648 Ordinance for settling the Militia of the City and County of Exeter.
- 11 July 1648 Ordinance for the continuance of the Excise from 29 September 1648, to 29 September 1650.
- 11 July 1648 Ordinance amending those of 5 June and 3 July for the maintenance of troops in Lincolnshire.
- 20 July 1648 Ordinance for the Salaries of the Auditors of the Army Accounts.
- 20 July 1648 Ordinance for taking the accounts of officers and soldiers, or widows of officers and soldiers who have served the Parliament otherwise than under the pay of particular Counties or Associations or in the Army of Sir Thomas Fairfax.
- 24 July 1648 Ordinance for settling the Militia of the County of Dorset and the Town and County of Poole.
- 24 July 1648 Ordinance amending those of 16 November 1646, and 13 May 1647, for the sale of Bishops' lands.
- 25 July 1648 Ordinance for raising a troop of Horse in Huntingdonshire, amending an Order of 19 June for the Committee at Derby House to raise Horse and Foot in that County, and the Ordinance of 23 June 1647, for the payment of the Army.
- 27 July 1648 Ordinance amending those of 23 June 1647, and 24 December 1647, and 20 March 1647–8, for raising money in Suffolk for the maintenance of Forces to suppress rebellion there.
- 29 July 1648 Ordinance for the Forces in Yorkshire to have the revenues payable to the King and Queen in that and neighbouring Counties.
- 1 August 1648 Ordinance amending that of 20 March 1647–8, to raise money for the Forces in Nottinghamshire, in view of the recent Insurrection in the North.
- 2 August 1648 Ordinance to settle the Militia of Middlesex.
- 2 August 1648 Ordinance to raise a Troop of Horse in the Isle of Ely.
- 9 August 1648 Ordinance for the better regulation of the sequestration of Estates of Papists and Delinquents and for reforming abuses in the management thereof.
- 21 August 1648 Ordinance for the association of the five counties of Carnarvon, Merioneth, Denbigh, Montgomery, and Flint.
- 21 August 1648 Ordinance authorizing the Lord High Admiral to execute Martial Law at Sea, amended by an additional Ordinance 23 August.
- 25 August 1648 Additional Ordinance for the better regulation of the sequestration of the Estates of Papists and Delinquents.
- 29 August 1648 Ordinance to settle the Form of Church Government in the Church of England and Ireland.
- 4 September 1648 Ordinance amending an Order of 12 July 1648, for General Skippon to enlist volunteers for the Committee of the London Militia to raise forces under Major-General Skippon.
- 6 September 1648 Ordinance amending those of 24 July 1648, and 20 March 1647–8, to settle the Militia of Dorset.
- 21 September 1648 Ordinance to borrow £10,000 of the City to defray the charges of the Treaty.
- 21 September 1648 Ordinance explaining that of 14 April 1648, giving powers to the contractors for the sale of Bishops' lands.
- 21 September 1648 Ordinance amending those of 28 May 1647, and 16 June 1648, for the purchase of arms and ammunition.
- 21 September 1648 Ordinance to settle the Militia of Hereford.
- 23 September 1648 Ordinance to prevent the exportation of Bullion.
- 25 September 1648 Ordinance amending that of 17 March 1647–8, for the better raising of £8,000 per annum for the Elector Palatine.
- 3 October 1648 Ordinance to dispose of impropriations, tithes, etc., belonging to the Archbishops and Bishops.
- 6 October 1648 Ordinance continuing from 29 September 1648, to 25 March 1649, the Ordinance of 15 March 1646/7, for an assessment for the maintenance of the Forces.
- 10 October 1648 Ordinance amending several Ordinances of 24 December 1647, for the payment of arrears due to officers who served under the late Lord Fairfax.
- 13 October 1648 Declaration and Order to prevent officers from disturbing the Houses on account of their arrears.
- 16 October 1648 Ordinance for payment of the Guards of Horse that attend the Parliament out of sequestrated estates.
- 18 October 1648 Declaration or Ordinance for the sequestration of the real and personal estate of Delinquents, for the maintenance of a Troop of Horse in the County of Surrey.
- 19 October 1648 Ordinance for a Duty on Goods to and from France for the benefit of the Company of Merchants trading with France, whose ships have been detained there.
- 27 October 1648 Additional Ordinance for the payment of tithe, continuing that of 9 August 1647, from 31 October 1648, to 1 November 1650.
- 30 October 1648 Ordinance for appointing new Judges.
- 14 November 1648 Further Ordinance amending that of 16 October 1648, for the payment of the Guard of Horse attending the Parliament.
- 21 November 1648 Ordinance for enabling a Committee of the two Houses to remove obstructions in the sale of the lands of the late Archbishops and Bishops.
- 2 December 1648 Ordinance for settling the Militia in the several counties, cities, and places within the Kingdom of England, Dominion of Wales, and in the Town of Berwick-upon-Tweed.
- 16 December 1648 Ordinance repealing that of 2 December 1648, for settling the Militia.
- 16 December 1648 Ordinance repealing that of 29 August 1645, for the Militia of the County of Lancaster.
- 18 December 1648 Ordinance for the election of Common Councilmen and other officers within the City of London and the Liberties thereof, for the ensuing year.
- 20 December 1648 Further Ordinance for the election of Officers, etc., in London.

== 1649 ==
- 6 January 1648/9 Act erecting a High Court of Justice for the trial of the King.
- January, 1648/9 Ordinances amending various former Ordinances concerning Assessment for the Army and the disbanding of supernumerary forces.
- 16 January 1648/9 Act adjourning Hilary Term from Octabis Hilarii to Crastino Purificationis.
- 16 January 1648/9 Act touching the regulating of the officers of the Navy and Customs.
- 17 January 1648/9 Ordinance for settling the Militia of the City of London.
- 22 January 1648/9 Act for the Committee of the County of Lincoln to lay an assessment of £2,500 for the relief of the Forces before Pontefract.
- 29 January 1648/9 Act for the alteration of several names and forms heretofore used in Courts, Writs, etc., and for settling of proceedings in Courts of Law, Justice and Equity in the Kingdoms of England and Ireland and the Dominion of Wales.
- 30 January 1648/9 Act prohibiting the proclaiming any person to be King of England or Ireland or the Dominions thereof.
- 2 February 1648/9 Act transferring to the use of the Navy for two years, the assessment for the Garrisons of the Isle of Ely and Croyland made under Ordinances of 12 August 1645, 1 November 1647, and 24 August 1647.
- 2 February 1648/9 Act further adjourning Hilary Term from Crastino Purificationis to Octabis Purificationis.
- 3 February 1648/9 Act for erecting a High Court of Justice for trying James, Earl of Cambridge; Henry, Earl of Holland; George, Lord Goring; Arthur, Lord Capell; and Sir John Owen, Knight. (Amended 9 February).
- 8 February 1648/9 Act for committing the Great Seal of England into the hands of Commissioners.
- 9 February 1648/9 Act to repeal several clauses in the Acts of 1° Eliz. and 3° Jacobi, touching the Oaths of Allegiance, Obedience and Supremacy.
- 9 February 1648/9 Act to prevent the printing of any of the proceedings of the High Court of Justice erected for trying of James, Earl of Cambridge, and others, without leave of the House of Commons or of the said Court.
- 10 February 1648/9 Act prescribing the form of an oath to be taken by every freeman of the City of London and other Cities, Boroughs, and Towns Corporate, in England Wales.
- 11 February 1648/9 Act for altering the style of the late Court of King's Bench to that of the Court of Upper Bench, and for settling its jurisdiction
- 13 February 1648/9 Act for constituting a Council of State for the Commonwealth of England.
- 15 February 1648/9 Act for the more easy passing the Accounts of Sheriffs.
- 17 February 1648/9 Act enabling Justices of the Peace, Sheriffs and other Ministers of Justice to act until their commissions are ready.
- 17 February 1648/9 Act for settling proceedings in Courts of Justice according to the present Government. Cf. 26 December 1653.
- 21 February 1648/9 Act for the election of the Bailiffs, Wardens, Assistants, and other officers of the Company of Weavers.
- 22 February 1648/9 Act for the encouragement of Officers and Mariners, and for impressing Seamen.
- 23 February 1648/9 Act repealing all former Ordinances constituting Robert Earl of Warwick Lord High Admiral, and vesting the power of the Office in the Council of State.
- 23 February 1648/9 Act concerning the sequestration of South Wales and the County of Monmouth.
- 24 February 1648/9 Act appointing Commissioners for the fleet now at Sea.
- 24 February 1648/9 Act supplementary to that of 22 February, for the encouragement of mariners and officers, and for impressing seamen.
- 26 February 1648/9 Act altering the Judicial Seal in the three counties of Carmarthen, Cardigan and Pembroke.
- 26 February 1648/9 Act continuing for one week that of 3 February for constituting a High Court of Justice to try James, Earl of Cambridge (Duke of Hamilton) and others.
- 28 February 1648/9 Act for removing obstructions in the proceedings of the Common Council of the City of London.
- 28 February 1648/9 Act regulating elections of officers in the City of Norwich, to prevent the election of ill-affected persons. (Amended 7 March.)
- 2 March 1648/9 Act for compounding with Delinquents in the counties of Northumberland, Cumberland, Westmorland, Durham, the town and county of Newcastle upon Tyne, and the town of Berwickupon-Tweed, for employing their compositions for paying and disbanding the forces in those counties; and for discharging other public engagements of the counties.
- 10 March 1648/9 Acts for altering the judicial Seal for the counties of Carnarvon, Merioneth and Anglesea, and for the counties of Brecknock, Radnor, and Glamorgan.
- 10 March 1648/9 Act to transfer the salaries of the Judges and others for the use of the Navy.
- 17 March 1648/9 Act for abolishing the kingly office in England, Ireland and the Dominions thereunto belonging.
- 17 March 1648/9 Act for keeping a Day of Humiliation upon Thursday, the 5 April 1649.
- 19 March 1648/9 Act for settling the Militia of the City of Westminster and Liberties thereof, and of all the parishes and places adjacent of the County of Middlesex within the weekly Bills of Mortality, and late Lines of Communication, except the Hamlets of the Tower.
- 19 March 1648/9 Act abolishing the House of Peers.
- 23 March 1648/9 Acts for altering the Seals of the Court of Upper Bench, Common Pleas and Exchequer.
- 7 April 1649 Act for raising £90,000 per mensem for maintenance of the Forces raised by authority of Parliament for the service of England and Ireland; from 25 March to 29 Sept. 1649.
- 9 April 1649 Act prescribing certain times to Delinquents for perfecting their compositions under several penalties.
- 17 April 1649 Act appointing Treasurers at War to receive and issue monies assessed and paid under the Act of 7 April 1659, for the monthly payment of £90,000.
- 17 April 1649 Act declaring the grounds and causes of making prize the ships and goods that shall be taken by the Parliament's ships at sea, and for the encouragement of officers, mariners, and seamen.
- 17 April 1649 Act appointing Commissioners for the sale of Prize Goods.
- 23 April 1649 Act empowering the Court of Admiralty to proceed to sentence, notwithstanding Prohibitions (of 12 April 1648, 2 April 1651, 2 June 1654).
- 23 April 1649 Act for setting apart a Day of Public Fast and Humiliation, and repealing the Monthly Fast appointed by Proclamation of 8 January 1641–2, and enforced by Ordinances of 24 August 1642, etc.
- 26 April 1649 Act constituting Justices of Peace in the County of Lancaster.
- 30 April 1649 Act for the abolishing of Deans, Deans and Chapters, Canons, Prebends, and other officers or titles belonging to any Cathedral or Collegiate Church or Chapel in England and Wales, and for the employment of their revenues (of 31 July 1648, and 16 October 1650).
- 1 May 1649 Act for altering the original seal of the counties of Brecknock, Radnor, and Glamorgan.
- 7 May 1649 Act for the relief and employment of the Poor, and punishment of Vagrants and other disorderly Persons within the City of London.
- 7 May 1649 Act giving power to the Committee of Essex to discharge such Delinquents in that county as the Committee hath power to compound with.
- 9 May 1649 Act to transmit into the Chancery and Exchequer certain Orders and Instructions of Parliament concerning Tonnage and Poundage of Goods and Merchandise with the Book of Rates of the same.
- 9 May 1649 Act empowering the Barons of the Exchequer, as Commissioners for appeals touching Delinquents, to administer an Oath.
- 10 May 1649 Act for altering the original seal of the two Counties of Denbigh and Montgomery.
- 10 May 1649 Act for altering the former Seal of the Nisi Prius belonging to the Upper Bench.
- 12 May 1649 Act for the more certain and constant supply of the soldiery with pay and the preventing any further oppression or damage to the people by Free Quarters and Billet.
- 14 May 1649 Additional Act for Commissioners in the several counties for the monthly assessment of £90,000, in accordance with the Act of April 7.
- 14 May 1649 Act declaring what offences shall be adjudged Treason.
- 19 May 1649 Act declaring and constituting the People of England to be a Commonwealth.
- 23 May 1649 Act appointing additional Commissioners for the monthly assessment of £90,000.
- 23 May 1649 Act for settling the Militia of the Hamlets within the Tower of London.
- 28 May 1649 Act for the present examining and stating the accounts of Officers and Soldiers now in Parliament's service within this nation.
- 29 May 1649 Act declaring that the Act for abolishing Deans, etc. (30 April 1649), doth not extent to the Colleges of Winchester and Eton.
- 29 May 1649 Act for draining the Great Level of the Fens extending itself into the counties of Northampton, Norfolk, Suffolk, Lincoln, Cambridge, and Huntingdon, and the Isle of Ely, or some of them
- 1 June 1649 Act for setting apart a Day of Public Thanksgiving.
- 2 June 1649 Act for instructions for the Trustees, Treasurers, and Register-Accomptant for the sale of the Deans' and Chapters' lands, for the admitting such as have moneys owing them by Parliament to double the same upon the credit of the lands of the Deans and Chapters.
- 8 June 1649 Act for maintenance of preaching Ministers and other pious uses.
- 11 June 1649 Act for altering the original Seal for the three counties of Carmarthen, Pembroke and Cardigan
- 11 June 1649 Act for altering the former Seal of Nisi Prius belonging to the Court of Common Pleas.
- 12 June 1649 Act concerning Foreign Salt.
- 13 June 1649 Act for the further relief of maimed soldiers and the widows and orphans of soldiers slain in the service of the Parliament.
- 16 June 1649 Act that all Bonds, Bills, and Writings obligatory, entered into, to the use of the Commonwealth, touching Customs and Excise shall be made and taken in the name of Custodes Libertatis Angliæ Authoritate Parliamenti; for returning them into the Court of Exchequer; and for Proceedings to be had thereupon in the said Court for levying the said Debts.
- 18 June 1649 Act for the relief of all such persons as have been or shall be sued, molested or in anyway damnified contrary to Articles or Conditions granted in Time of War.
- 19 June 1649 Act for enabling the Judges that go the Northern Circuit to hold an Assize at Durham on Thursday, the 2 August 1649.
- 19 June 1649 Act touching the salaries of the Treasurers and Contractors for sale of Deans' and Chapters' lands.
- 20 June 1649 Act for removing obstructions in the sale of Lands of Bishops, and Deans and Chapters.
- 22 June 1649 Act for making a Steward and Judge of the Court of Pleas of the Isle of Ely.
- 23 June 1649 Additional instructions to the Trustees and Contractors for the sale of the Lands of Deans and Chapters (cf. 2 June 1649 ).
- 25 June 1649 Additional Act for the encouragement of purchasers of lands of Deans and Chapters.
- 25 June 1649 Act to authorise the Council of State to grant Letters of Marque or Reprisal in several cases.
- 25 June 1649 Act for the Sessions of Assizes to be held and kept in the Castle of Lancaster upon Wednesday, the 5th September, 1649.
- 27 June 1649 Act touching the first £400,000 charged on the Excise.
- 29 June 1649 Act for borrowing £150,000 upon the first £400,000 charged on the Excise.
- 29 June 1649 Act for discharge of the Commissioners of the Grand Excise until 29 September 1647.
- 4 July 1649 Act for the Sale of the Goods and personal Estate of the late King, and of the Queen and Prince.
- 13 July 1649 Act for the alteration of the original seal of the counties of Carnarvon, Merioneth, and Anglesey.
- 16 July 1649 Act for the sale of the Honors, Manors, Lands, etc., heretofore belonging to the late King, Queen, and Prince.
- 17 July 1649 Act touching the monies and coins of England.
- 17 July 1649 Act declaring what offences shall be adjudged Treason.
- 17 July 1649 Act touching the Arrear of the County of Lancaster.
- 19 July 1649 Act for settling the Militia of the Borough of Southwark and parishes adjacent, mentioned in the Weekly Bills of Mortality, on the South side of the Thames in the County of Surrey.
- 27 July 1649 Act for promoting and propagating the Gospel of Jesus Christ in New England.
- 28 July 1649 Act for altering the Seal of the Court of the Duchy Chamber of Lancaster at Westminster, and of the County Palatine of Lancaster.
- 30 July 1649 Act empowering the Lord Mayor, Justices of Gaol, delivery for Newgate, to transport three score prisoners convicted of Felony and other heinous crimes, unto the Summer Islands or other new English Plantations.
- 31 July 1649 Act for further instructions to the Trustees, Treasurers, etc., for Sale of the Lands and Possessions of the late Deans, Sub-Deans, Deans and Chapters, etc., and for the better execution of the former Acts, Ordinances and Instructions concerning the same.
- 1 August 1649 Act for continuing the monthly assessment of the £90,000 from the 29th September to the 29 December 1649.
- 3 August 1649 Act giving power to the Committee of Indemnity to transmit the examination of all such Articles or Information as shall be exhibited to them against any Malignant or Delinquent Magistrates, or other ill-affected Officers, to Justices of Peace in the several Counties.
- 8 August 1649 Act for taking accompts belonging to the Navy and Customs.
- 10 August 1649 Act to admit the Six Counties of North Wales to a general composition for their Delinquency.
- 14 August 1649 Act for the speedy raising and levying of moneys by way of New Impost or Excise.
- 16 August 1649 Act and Declaration for setting apart a Day of Public Thanksgiving to be kept on Wednesday the 19 August 1649.
- 17 August 1649 Act empowering the Committee of Indemnity to transmit the examinations of all such Articles and Information as shall be exhibited to them, against malignant or delinquent magistrates, or other ill-affected officers, to Justices of Peace in their several Counties; repealing the Act of 3 August 1659, to the same effect.
- 17 August 1649 Act for stating the accounts of such General Officers, Staff Officers, and other Officers and Artificers of the Train lately entertained for the service of Ireland.
- 21 August 1649 Act continuing till further Orders the Ordinance of the 20th July, 1648, for salaries and allowances to the auditors for the accompts of the Soldiery, and for adding £1,000 thereto.
- 28 August 1649 Act admitting purchasers of Bishops' Lands to pay their whole purchase money by Weavers' Hall Bills.
- 28 August 1649 Act touching the second £400,000 charged on the Receipts of the Excise and Goldsmiths' Hall.
- 28 August 1649 Act prohibiting the importation of any Wines of the Growth of France, and all manufactures of wool and silk made in France.
- 31 August 1649 Act for settling the Islands in the West Indies betwixt the degrees of 24 and 29 North Latitude.
- 4 September 1649 Act for Discharging poor prisoners unable to satisfy their creditors.
- 5 September 1649 Act concerning Oaths imposed upon Mayors, Justices of the Peace, and other officers.
- 5 September 1649 Act for relief of Felt makers and Hatband makers against aliens and strangers importing such wares to the hindrance of their manufactures.
- 12 September 1649 Act prohibiting to brew for sale Ale or Beer above ten shillings the barrel besides the Excise.
- 20 September 1649 Act against, unlicensed and scandalous Books and Pamphlets, and for better regulating of printing.
- 20 September 1649 Act for the Punishment of Crimes committed upon or beyond the Seas.
- 26 September 1649 Act for the continuance and maintenance of the School and Almshouses of Westminster.
- 5 October 1649 Act for liberty to transport spices ungarbled.
- 11 October 1649 Act for a Day of Public Thanksgiving to be held on Thursday, 1 November 1649.
- 11 October 1649 Act for taking and receiving the accompts of the Commonwealth, with Instructions concerning the same.
- 7 November 1649 Act for trial of the pix-monies.
- 16 November 1649 Act empowering the Council of State to administer an Oath unto the Jury for the making of two standard pieces of Gold and Silver, to be approved of by this House.
- 23 November 1649 Act with further instructions to the Treasurers, Trustees, and other the Persons employed in the sale of Honors, Manors and Lands belonging to the late King, Queen and Prince, and for the stating of Accompts.
- 7 December 1649 Act for an assessment for six months from 25 December 1649, for the maintenance of the Forces raised by Parliament for the service of England and Ireland, at the rate of £90,000 per mensem for the first three months and at the rate of £60,000 per mensem for the last three months.
- 14 December 1649 Act disabling the election of divers persons to any office or place of Trust within the City of London, and the votes of such persons in such elections; to continue for one year.
- 18 December 1649 Act touching elections of Questmen, Constables, and all other subordinate officers in the City of London.
- 21 December 1649 An Act discharging from imprisonment poor prisoners unable to satisfy their creditors.
- 27 December 1649 Act continuing the Committee of the Army and Treasurers at Wars.

== 1650 ==
- 2 January 1649/50 Act for subscribing the Engagement.
- 25 January 1649/50 Act for the better ordering and managing the estates of Papists and Delinquents.
- 4 February 1649/50 Act appointing Thursday the 28th February as a Day of Solemn Humiliation, Fasting and Prayer, and declaring the Grounds and Reasons thereof.
- 13 February 1649/50 Act constituting a Council of State.
- 18 February 1649/50 Act for the removing of obstructions in the sale of the Honours, Manors and Lands of the late King, Queen and Prince.
- 19 February 1649/50 Act giving power to the Council of State to execute such Powers, Jurisdictions and Authorities as concern the Lord Admiral and Lord Warden of the Cinque Ports for the year ensuing.
- 22 February 1649/50 Act for the better propagation and preaching of the Gospel in Wales, and for redress of some grievances.
- 22 February 1649/50 Act enabling the Council of State or any three of them to administer an Oath of secrecy to the members of that Council for the year ensuing
- 23 February 1649/50 Act for giving a further time for subscribing the Engagement in accordance with the Act of 2 January 1649/50.
- 6 February 1649/50 Act for removing all Papists, and all Officers and Soldiers of Fortune, and divers other Delinquents from London and Westminster, and confining them within five miles of their dwellings, and for encouragement of such as discover Priests and Jesuits, their Receivers and Abettors.
- 1 March 1649/50 Act, to continue for three years from 1 March 1649/50, for the propagation of the Gospel in the Four Northern Counties.
- 2 March 1649/50 Act for impressing mariners and seamen for the public service.
- 6 March 1649/50 Act for the Assizes to be kept for the County of Lancaster.
- 8 March 1649/50 Act for the better advancement of the Gospel and Learning in Ireland, by the maintenance of a College and Free School in or near to Dublin.
- 11 March 1649/50 Act for redress of Delays and Mischiefs arising by Writs of Error in several cases.
- 11 March 1649/50 Act for selling the Fee-Farm Rents belonging to the Commonwealth of England and heretofore payable to the Crown of England, Duchy of Lancaster and Duchy of Cornwall.
- 12 March 1649/50 Act for the better packing of Butter and redress of Abuses therein.
- 12 March 1649/50 Act for settling certain houses upon the President and Governor of the Corporation for the Poor of the City of London and Liberties thereof.
- 26 March 1650 Act for establishing a High Court of Justice.
- 26 March 1650 Act for the Redemption of Captives taken by Turkish, Moorish and other pirates.
- 28 March 1650 Act amending the Act of 14 August 1649, for regulating the Excise of Ale and Beer, by repealing Clause XXXV. and otherwise.
- 29 March 1650 Act for the more frequent preaching of the Gospel and better maintenance of Ministers in the City of Bristol.
- 5 April 1650 Act imposing penalties on such as purchase, as original creditors, any of the Crown lands, who shall offer to pay with assigned or false bills.
- 5 April 1650 Act for providing maintenance for Ministers, and other pious uses.
- 6 April 1650 Act for granting Habeas Corpus to poor prisoners for Debt, upon Oath that they are not worth £5, to go at Liberty upon their own Security, for prosecuting their own Habeas Corpus.
- 11 April 1650 Act continuing till 1 April 1653, the Act for the better propagating of the Gospel in the Four Northern Counties.
- 13 April 1650 Act for preventing Wrongs and Abuses done to Merchants at Sea, and prohibiting Mariners from serving Foreign Princes or States without License.
- 15 April 1650 Act empowering several Commissioners to put in execution all and every the Powers and authorities heretofore given to the Commissioners for compounding with Delinquents, and for managing of all Estates under Sequestration, and to the Committee for Advance of Money, formerly sitting at Haberdasher's Hall.
- 19 April 1650 Act for the better observation of the Lord's Day, Days of Public Humiliation and Thanksgiving.
- 25 April 1650 Act empowering the Commissioners for sequestrations to examine, upon Oath, and to give Acquittances for the monies they shall receive.
- 10 May 1650 Act for suppressing the detestable sins of Incest, Adultery, and Fornication. Death penalty for second offence for a Bawd.
- 15 May 1650 Act for securing such Monies as shall be advanced and lent for the use of the Navy and Army, together with Interest for the same, to be paid out of the £200,000, remainder of the £400,000 charged upon the Grand Excise (cf. Act of 27 June 1649).
- 21 May 1650 Act appointing Thursday, the 13th June, as a day of Public Fasting and Humiliation.
- 21 May 1650 Act for an assessment for six months, from 24 June 1650, for maintenance of the forces raised for the service of England and Ireland, at the rate of £90,000 for the first three months, and £60,000 for the last three months.
- 31 May 1650 Act for the better payment of Augmentations out of the Impropriate Rectories, Vicarages, and Tithes sequestered from Papists and Delinquents.
- 4 June 1650 Act enabling the Militia of the City of London to raise Horse within the said City and Liberties for defence of the Parliament, City of London, and Liberties thereof, and the parts adjacent.
- 7 June 1650 Act for settling the Militia of the City of Westminster, and the Liberties thereof: to continue for one year.
- 20 June 1650 Act for New England to pay Custom and Excise for all Tobacco of the Growth of New England.
- 20 June 1650 Act continuing for six months the Act of 18 June 1649, for the relief of such persons as have been or are, or shall be, sued, molested or in any ways damnified contrary to Articles or conditions granted in time of war.
- 25 June 1650 Act continuing the Acts of 17 April and 27 December 1649, for the continuance of the Committee of the Army and Treasurers at War.
- 25 June 1650 Act constituting Major-General Philip Skippon Major-General and Commander-in-Chief of all the Forces within the City of London and Liberties thereof and late Lines of Communication and weekly Bills of Mortality.
- 26 June 1650 Act for repealing the Ordinance and Act of Parliament of 15 February 1644–5, constituting Thomas Lord Fairfax Captain-General and Commander-in-Chief of all the Forces of Parliament, and for continuing in force the commissions granted by the said Lord Fairfax.
- 26 June 1650 Act for ordaining and appointing Oliver Cromwell, Esquire, Captain-General and Commander-in-Chief of all the Forces raised and to be raised within the Commonwealth of England.
- 28 June 1650 Act for the better preventing of prophane swearing and cursing.
- 11 July 1650 Act for setting apart a Day of Public Thanksgiving to be kept on Friday, the 26th July, together with a Declaration and Narrative expressing the reasons and grounds thereof.
- 11 July 1650 Act for the Sheriffs to appoint Deputies to receive the commands of the Parliament and Council of State, and the respective Sheriffs to make due return thereof.
- 11 July 1650 Act settling the Militia of the Commonwealth of England.
- 18 July 1650 Act empowering the Committee of the Militia of the City of London to execute the powers in the Ordinance of 3 December 1644, for raising of money to pay the charge of the Fortifications, and Guards, in getting in Arrears collected by virtue of the said former ordinance.
- 18 July 1650 Act empowering the Committee of the Militia of Westminster to raise Horses within the said City and Liberties thereof, and Parishes and Places adjacent, for defence of the Parliament, City and Parts aforesaid.
- 1 August 1650 Act concerning Mortgages, Extents and other Incumbrances upon Delinquents' Estates.
- 1 August 1650 Act for the advancing and regulating of the Trade of this Commonwealth.
- 2 August 1650 Act to prohibit all commerce and traffic between England and Scotland, and enjoining the departure of Scots out of this Commonwealth.
- 9 August 1650 Act against several atheistic, blasphemous and execrable opinions derogatory to the honour of God, and destructive to human society.
- 13 August 1650 Act for the further explanation of the Act of 11 March 1649–50, for selling the Fee Farm Rents belonging to the Commonwealth of England, formerly payable to the Crown of England Duchy of Lancaster, and Duchy of Cornwall.
- 20 August 1650 Act continuing for three years the receipts of the Excise.
- 27 August 1650 Act giving further power to the High Court of Justice.
- 27 August 1650 Act and Declaration of the Parliament of England touching a Pamphlet intituled "A Declaration by the King's Majesty to his subjects of the Kingdoms of England, Scotland and Ireland."
- 29 August 1650 Act for the more frequent Preaching of the Gospel and better maintenance of the ministers in the Town of Colchester in the county of Essex.
- 17 September 1650 Act for setting apart the 8th day of October for a Day of Public Thanksgiving, with a Narrative setting forth the grounds and reasons thereof.
- 19 September 1650 Act for the Incouragement and Indemnity of such persons as voluntarily engage themselves in the service of the Parliament in this time of Common Danger.
- 20 September 1650 Act appointing Commissioners of the Excise
- 27 September 1650 Act for the relief of the religious and peaceable from the Rigour of former Acts of Parliament, in matters of Religion.
- 3 October 1650 Act prohibiting Commerce and Trade with the Barbodoes, Antigo, Virginia, and Bermudas alias Summer's Islands.
- 17 October 1650 Act for sale of the Manors of Rectories and Glebelands late belonging to the late Archbishops, bishops, Deans, Deans and Chapters.
- 22 October 1650 Additional Act for more speedy effecting the sale of the Manors of Rectories and Glebe-lands late belonging to Archbishops, Bishops, Deans, Deans and Chapters, and other Officers and Titles which late were of or belonging to any Cathedral or Collegiate Church or Chapel in England or Wales; and for the encouragement of lenders upon the security thereof; and of other Lands and Hereditaments of the said Deans, Deans and Chapters, etc.
- 23 October 1650 Act concerning the sale of Corn and Meal.
- 31 October 1650 Act for settling Convoys to secure the trade of this Nation.
- 6 November 1650 Act prohibiting all persons to assist the Scots with victuals, arms or ammunition against the Commonwealth of England during the enmity between the Nations.
- 7 November 1650 Act for easing the charge of Lords of Manors or Liberties and their Bailiffs in passing their accompts in the Court of Public Exchequer.
- 8 November 1650 Act for making ships and merchandise taken or to be taken from the King of Portugal, to be Prize.
- 14 November 1650 Act to regulate the making of Stuffs in Norfolk and Norwich.
- 22 November 1650 Act for turning the Books of the Law and all Process and Proceedings in Courts of Justice into the English Tongue.
- 26 November 1650 Act for the assessment of £120,000 per mensem for four months from the 25th December 1650, for maintenance of the Forces in England, Ireland and Scotland, raised by Authority of Parliament for the service of this Commonwealth.
- 27 November 1650 Act for George Manby, to prohibit any to make use of his invention for the boiling all sorts of liquor.
- 6 December 1650 Act for nominating and appointing several persons Commissioners in the Act for establishing a High Court of Justice (cf. Acts of 26 March and 27 August 1650 ).
- 10 December 1650 Act constituting a High Court of Justice within the Counties of Norfolk, Suffolk, Huntingdon, Cambridge, Lincoln, the counties of the cities of Norwich and Lincoln and within the Isle of Ely.
- 18 December 1650 Act for continuing for one year from 18 December 1650, the Act of 14 December 1659, for disabling the election of divers persons to any office or place of Trust within the City of London and the votes of such persons in such elections, and the Act of 18 December 1649, concerning the elections of Questmen, Constables, and all other subordinate officers whatsoever within the City of London and the Liberties thereof.
- 25 December 1650 Act touching the Commissioners for Ireland.

== 1651 ==
- 3 January 1650/1 Act for setting apart Thursday 30 January 1650/1, for a Day of Public Thanksgiving for the late great victories which the Lord hath given to the Forces of the Parliament both by land and sea, with a narrative of the same.
- 8 January 1650/1 Act touching the importation of Foreign Corn and Bullion.
- 10 January 1650/1 Act empowering the Lords Commissioners for custody of the Great Seal to issue Commissioners of Delegates, in cases of pretended marriages.
- 10 January 1650/1 Act for the continuance of the Committee of the Army and Treasurers at Wars (of 25 June 1650).
- 17 January 1650/1 Act for taking away the Fee called Damage-Cleere, Damna Clericorum.
- 22 January 1650/1 Act for appointing a Seal to be the Seal for the Parliament of the Commonwealth of England.
- 28 January 1650/1 Act for continuing till 1 May 1651, the Act of 11 July 1650, for settling the Militia of the Commonwealth of England.
- 6 February 1650/1 Additional Act for the sale of Fee-Farm rents and for the doubling of monies thereupon (cf. Act of 11 March 1649–50).
- 13 February 1650/1 Act constituting a Council of State for the Year ensuing.
- 13 February 1650/Act for settling the powers and authorities appertaining to the office of Lord High Admiral of England and Warden of the Cinque Ports formerly vested in the Council of State for the year past, in the present Council of State.
- 13 February 1650/1 Act appointing an oath to be taken by the members of the Council of State.
- 28 February 1650/1 Act for authorising Colonel Popham, Colonel Blake, and Colonel Deane, Admiral and General of the Fleet.
- 28 February 1650/1 Act empowering the Council of State or Admirals for the time being to impress seamen, from 1 April 1651 to 1 April 1652 (cf. Act of 2 March 1649/50).
- 7 March 1650/1 Act and Declaration setting for the grounds and reasons for setting apart Thursday, the 13th Day of March instant, for a Day of Public Fasting and Humiliation within the Cities of London and Westminster and within the late Lines of Communication; and also, for setting apart Wednesday, the 2nd April, 1651, for Public Fasting and Humiliation throughout the residue of this Commonwealth.
- 11 March 1650/1 Act for the continuance of the Customs from 26 March 1651, to 26 March 1653.
- 19 March 1650/1 Act continuing until 1 November 1651, the Act of 26 February 1649–50, for removing of all Papists, and all Officers and Soldiers of Fortune, and divers other Delinquents from London and Westminster, and confining them within five miles of their dwellings, and for encouragement of such as shall discover Priests and Jesuits, their Receivers and Abettors.
- 21 March 1650/1 Act for the more frequent Preaching of the Gospel and the better maintenance of ministers in the city of Coventry.
- 28 March 1651 Act for laying an imposition upon coals, for the Building and Maintenance of Ships for guarding the sea.
- 28 March 1651 Act amending the Act of 18 February 1649–50, enabling the Trustees for Sale of the Lands of the late King and Queen to give security of the said Lands upon several Debentures.
- 2 April 1651 Act concerning the new Invention of melting down Iron and other metals with stone-coal and other coals, without charking thereof.
- 2 April 1651 Act for the continuance of the Jurisdiction of the Court of Admiralty.
- 3 April 1651 Act of explanation of the Act of 11 July 1650, for settling the Militia of the Commonwealth, declaring the same not to extend to the Isle of Wight. This Act to continue for six months.
- 9 April 1651 Additional Act touching the Proceedings of the Law in English (cf. Act of 22 November 1650.
- 15 April 1651 Act for continuing the monthly assessment of £120,000 (levied by the Act of 29 November 1650) for six months from 25 March 1651, for maintenance of the Armies in England, Scotland and Ireland.
- 18 April 1651 Act for the continuance of the Committee of the Army and Treasurers at Wars (cf. 10 January 1650–1).
- 18 April 1651 Act for impressing soldiers for the service of this Commonwealth in Ireland.
- 18 June 1651 Act for altering the Market in the Town of Newcastle from Monday in every week to Tuesday in every week.
- 20 June 1651 Act for continuing the High Court of Justice until 29 September 1651.
- 26 June 1651 Act for continuing till 1 December 1651, the powers settled in the Council of State by the Act of 13 February 1650–1, enabling the Council of State to exercise the powers belonging to the office of the Lord Admiral.
- 26 June 1651 Act for making the River Wye in the County of Surrey navigable.
- 4 July 1651 Act for enabling the Judges of the Northern Circuit to hold an Assize at Durham on 11 August 1651.
- 16 July 1651 Act for the sale of several lands and estates forfeited to the Commonwealth for Treason.
- 17 July 1651 Additional Act for the sale of the goods belonging to the late King, Queen, and Prince (cf. Act of 4 July 1649).
- 24 July 1651 Act prohibiting killing, hurting, or taking away any Deer, after 1 August 1651, without consent of the Owner.
- 8 August 1651 Act forbidding any person to take above the rate of Six Pounds for the loan of One Hundred Pounds for a year.
- 12 August 1651 Act for enabling certain persons to put in execution the powers in the several Acts for settling the several Militias of the Cities of Westminster, the Borough of Southwark, and places adjacent, and the Hamlets of the Tower of London.
- 12 August 1651 Act prohibiting correspondence with Charles Stuart or his party.
- 12 August 1651 Act concerning the Militias in the respective counties within this Commonwealth.
- 13 August 1651 Act giving instructions to the Commissioners of the respective Militias to prohibit the disposing of any Ordnance, Arms, or Ammunition without licence, wearing arms, and tumultuous meetings.
- 15 August 1651 Act authorising several persons to put in execution several Ordinances and Acts of Parliament for settling the Militia of the City of London and for raising horses within the said City, to continue in force till 1 December 1651.
- 19 August 1651 Act concerning the Minster of Peterborough.
- 19 August 1651 Act giving further powers to the respective Committees of the Militia of the City of London, the Hamlets of the Tower, Southwark, and Westminster.
- 1 September 1651 Act for further continuing for three months from 29 September 1651, the monthly assessment of £120,000 (cf. Act of 15 April 1651 ).
- 2 September 1651 Act enabling the Commissioners of the respective Militias within this Commonwealth to raise money for the maintenance of the Forces by them respectively raised for the present service.
- 2 September 1651 Act charging £100,000 upon the receipt of the Grand Excise for the use of the Navy.
- 3 September 1651 Act for continuance of the Committee of the Army and Treasurers at War.
- 25 September 1651 Act for continuing the High Court of Justice until 31 December 1651 (cf. Act of 20 June 1651 ).
- 26 September 1651 Act for setting apart the 24th October as a Day of Public Thanksgiving, with a narrative declaring the grounds and reasons thereof.
- 30 September 1651 Act providing for maimed soldiers and widows and orphans of soldiers of the Armies of Scotland and Ireland.
- 9 October 1651 Act for increase of shipping and encouragement of the navigation of this nation.
- 28 November 1651 Act for constituting a Council of State from 30 November 1651, to 1 December 1652.
- 4 December 1651 Act continuing to 1 December 1652, the Act of 26 June 1651, enabling the Council of State to exercise the powers belonging to the Lord Admiral.
- 19 December 1651 Act for continuance of two Acts (of 14 and 18 December 1649) touching election of officers in the City of London (cf. Act of 18 December 1650).
- 19 December 1651 Act for raising £90,000 a month for six months from the 25th December, 1651, for maintenance of the Forces in England, Ireland, and Scotland, raised by the authority of Parliament for the service of the Commonwealth (cf. Act of 1 September 1651 ).

== 1652 ==
- 1 January 1651/2 Act for settling the Committee of the Army and Treasurers at Wars.
- 17 January 1651/2 Act for explanation of the Act of 1 January 1651/2, for appointing a Committee for the Army and Treasurers at Wars.
- 21 January 1651/2 Act for the continuance from 22 January 1651/2, to 1 November 1652, and amendment of the Act of 15 April 1650, empowering several Commissioners to put in execution all and every the powers and authorities heretofore given to the Commissioners for compounding with Delinquents.
- 30 January 1651/2 Act for the execution of a Judgement in Parliament against Lieutenant Colonel John Lilburne.
- 4 February 1651/2 Act to make void all Titles of Honours, Dignities, or Precedencies, given by the late King since the 4th January, 1641/2.
- 24 February 1651/2 Act of General Pardon and Oblivion.
- 27 February 1651/2 Act for the better and more effectual discovery of Thieves and Highwaymen.
- 12 March 1651/2 Act for impressing of Seamen.
- 31 March 1652 Act continuing till the 25th December 1652, the Act of 26 March 1650, the further redemption of Captives.
- 1 April 1652 Act prohibiting the planting of Tobacco in England.
- 1 April 1652 Act continuing the jurisdiction of the Duchy and County Palatine of Lancaster till 1 January 1652–3.
- 1 April 1652 Act for transferring the powers now in the several Committees for removing obstructions in the sale of lands of the late Archbishop, Bishops, Deans, King, Queen, etc.
- 21 April 1652 Act for transferring the powers now in the Committee for regulating the Universities to several Commissioners.
- 27 April 1652 Further Additional Act for the relief of Poor Prisoners (of. Acts of 4 September 1649, 21 December 1649, and 6 April 1650).
- 3 June 1652 Additional Act for sale of Fee Farm Rents (of. Acts of 6 February 1650–1, and 11 March 1649–50).
- 4 June 1652 Act for setting apart Wednesday, 9 June, as a Day of Solemn Fasting and Humiliation within the Cities of London and Westminster, and weekly Bills of Mortality, and Wednesday, the 30th June, within the other parts of this Commonwealth with the grounds and reasons thereof.
- 15 June 1652 Act for raising £90,000 per month for six months from the 24th June 1652, towards the maintenance of the Forces in England, Ireland and Scotland, raised by authority of Parliament for the service of the Commonwealth (of. Act of 19 December 1651).
- 18 June 1652 Act for continuing the Committee of the Army and Treasurers at War.
- 23 June 1652 Act for transferring to certain Commissioners the powers of the late Committee of Indemnity.
- 16 June 1652 Act for the relief of counties doubly charged with assessments by default of Receivers General, Collectors, and Sub-Collectors.
- 4 August 1652 Act for several lands and estates forfeited to the Commonwealth for Treason, appointed to be sold for the use of the Navy.
- 10 August 1652 Act enabling the Judges of the Northern Circuits to hold an Assize at Durham on Friday, the 27 August 1652.
- 12 August 1652 Act for the settlement of Ireland.
- 25 August 1652 Act for stating and determining the accounts of such officers and soldiers as are or have been employed in the service of this Commonwealth in Ireland.
- 1 September 1652 Act for setting apart the Wednesday, the 13th day of October 1652, as a Day of Public Feasting and Humiliation.
- 2 September 1652 Act giving several powers to several persons constituted Commissioners for the affairs of Ireland and for repealing the powers of the former Commissioners.
- 9 September 1652 Act for calling home English seamen and mariners and inhibiting such to serve abroad without licence (of. Act, 13 April 1650.
- 9 September 1652 Additional Act for sale of Fee Farm Rents (of. Acts of 11 March 1649–50, 6 February 1650–1, and 3 June 1652).
- 29 September 1652 Act for reviving the Act of 18 June 1649, for Relief of Persons upon Articles of War, and for continuing it from 28 September 1652 until 28 September 1655.
- 8 October 1652 Act for disabling Delinquents to bear office or to have any voice or vote in election of any public officer.
- 12 October 1652 Act for further empowering the Commissioners for removing obstructions in the sale of lands to hear and determine claims (of. Act of 1 April 1652 ).
- 26 October 1652 Act for continuance till May, 1653, of several Commissioners in Scotland.
- 26 October 1652 Act for continuing from 31 October 1652, to 1 November 1653, the Act of 15 April 1650, empowering several Commissioners to compound with Delinquents and to manage estates under sequestration.
- 18 November 1652 An additional Act for sale of several lands and States forfeited to the Commonwealth for Treason.
- 23 November 1652 Act for settling the Powers of the Lord Admiral and Lord Warden of the Cinque Ports upon the Council of State from the 30th November, 1653, to 1 December 1653.
- 30 November 1652 Act constituting a Council of State from the 30th November, 1652, to 1 December 1653.
- 10 December 1652 Act for constituting Commissioners for ordering and managing the Affairs of the Admiralty and Navy to continue to 4 December 1653.
- 10 December 1652 Act for constituting Commissioners to have the Inspections into the Treasuries of this Commonwealth, and for settling a Treasury.
- 10 December 1652 Act for an Assessment at the rate of £120,000 a month for six months from 25 December 1652, to 25 June 1653, towards the maintenance of the armies in England, Ireland and Scotland, as also for the Navy (cf. Act of 15 June 1652 ).
- 16 December 1652 Act for ascertaining the time of payment of the monies due upon Weavers Hall Bills.
- 17 December 1652 Act appointing a Committee for the Army and Treasurers at War (cf. Act 18 June 1652 ).
- 17 December 1652 Act for further doubling of £100,000 upon the sale of several lands and estates forfeited to the Commonwealth for Treason. [cf. Act of 16 July 1651.]
- 21 December 1652 Act continuing till 26 December 1653, the Act for the Redemption of Captives.
- 31 December 1652 Act for exposing to sale divers Castles, Houses, Parks, Lands and Hereditaments, belonging to the late King, Queen, or Prince, exempted from Sale by the Act of 16 July 1649.

== 1653 ==
- 1 January 1652/3 Act authorising the Commissioners for the Excise to pay monies for the use of the Navy.
- 1 January 1652/3 Act empowering the Commissioners for inspecting the Treasuries to issue warrants for payment of the monies appointed for the use of the Navy.
- 1 January 1652/3 Act for continuing the Jurisdiction of the Duchy and County Palatine of Lancaster till 1 April 1653.
- 7 January 1652/3 Act for reviving and amending the Act of 20 September 1649, against unlicensed and scandalous books and pamphlets, and for regulation of printing.
- 9 February 1652/3 Act for making salt-petre.
- 18 March 1652/3 Act for the impressing of seamen from 18 March 1652/3, to 18 March 1653 /4 (cf. Act of
- 22 March 1652/3 Act continuing until 26 March 1654, the Act of 11 March 1650/1, for continuance of the Customs.
- 22 March 1652/3 Act for continuance of the Imposition upon Coals, towards the building and maintaining ships for guarding the seas; to continue till 6 March 1654/5 (cf. Act of 28 March 1651).
- 8 April 1653 Act for the Probate of Wills and granting administration.
- 8 April 1653 Act continuing the Jurisdiction of the Duchy and County Palatine of Lancaster until the 10th October, 1653 (cf. Act of 1 January 1652/3.
- 27 July 1653 Act appointing a Committee for the Army and Treasurers at War.
- 28 July 1653 Act for constituting Commissioners for the ordering and managing the business of the Admiralty and Navy.
- 28 July 1653 Act touching the several receipts of the Revenue and Treasuries of this Commonwealth and the bringing the same into one Treasury.
- 30 July 1653 Act for settling the Jurisdiction of the Admiralty, to continue till 26 March 1654.
- 2 August 1653 Act for taking away fines upon Bills, Declarations and original Writs.
- 8 August 1653 An additional Act for stating and determining the accounts of the officers and soldiers of the Army in Ireland.
- 24 August 1653 Act touching Marriages and the registering thereof, and also touching Birth and Burials.
- 30 August 1653 Act for the more speedy and effectual Bringing-in the Arrears of the Excise.
- 3 September. 1653 Act touching the Planters of Tobacco in Gloucestershire.
- 6 September 1653 Act for continuance of the receipts of the Excise up to the 29 December 1653.
- 8 September 1653 An Explanatory Additional Act for the sale of the remaining Fee-Farm Rents and the finishing of that whole affair (cf. Acts of 11 March 1649/50, 13 August 1650, and 6 February 1650/1; 3 June 1652; 9 September 1652).
- 17 September 1653 Act for continuing the Privilege and Jurisdiction of the County [Palatine] of Lancaster till the 1st January 1653 /4.
- 24 September 1653 Act for the speedy and effectual satisfaction of the Adventurers for land in Ireland, and of the Arrears due to the Soldiery there; and of other public Debts, and for the encouragement of Protestants to plant and inhabit Ireland.
- 5 October 1653 Act for the relief of Creditors and Poor Prisoners (cf. Acts of 4 September, December, 1649; 6 April 1650; 27 April 1652).
- 7 October 1653 Act for Accompts and clearing of Public Debts and for discovering frauds or concealments of any thing due to the Commonwealth.
- 13 October 1653 Act for the custody and relief of Idiots and Lunaticks; to continue to 1 September 1654.
- 19 October 1653 Act empowering the Committee for the Army to state and determine the accounts of all officers and soldiers and others employed by them, for monies by them received from the 26th March, 1647, until the 25 July 1653.
- 21 October 1653 Act enabling the Commissioners of Parliament for compounding with Delinquents to dispose of two parts of the lands and Estates of Recusants for the Benefit of the Commonwealth.
- 21 October 1653 Act for the better and more effectual Discovery and Prosecution of Thieves and Highwaymen.
- 29 October 1653 Act for continuing till the 1st January, 1653 /4, the powers of Commissioners for Compounding, etc., for advance of Money, and for Indemnity (cf. Act of).
- 2 November 1653 Act for constituting a Council of State to hold office for six months.
- 4 November 1653 Act for redress of Delays and mischief arising by writs of Error and Writs of false Judgment in several causes (cf. 11 March 1849/50).
- 4 November 1653 Act for repealing of a Branch of a certain Act of the late Parliament intituled An Act for Subscribing the Engagement (2 January 1649/50).
- 4 November 1653 Act concerning the Determination of several Claims now depending before the Commissioners for removing obstruction in the sale of lands, etc.
- 12 November 1653 Act for regulating the making of stuffs in Norwich and Norfolk (cf. Act of 14 November 1650).
- 21 November 1653 An Act for establishing a High Court of Justice to continue till 1 August 1654.
- 22 November 1653 Act for the De-afforestation, Sale and Improvement of the Forests and of the Honours, Manors, Tenements and Hereditaments within the usual limits and perambulations of the same, heretofore belonging to the late King, Queen and Prince.
- 24 November 1653 Act for an Assessment of £120,000 per month for six months, from the 25th December, 1653, to the 24th June 1654, towards the maintenance of the Armies and Navies of this Commonwealth (cf. Act of 10 December 1652).
- 3 December 1653 Act for constituting Commissioners for ordering and managing the Affairs of the Admiralty and Navy.
- 16 December 1653 The Government of the Commonwealth of England, Scotland and Ireland and the Dominions thereunto belonging (The Instrument of Government).
- 24 December 1653 Ordinance for continuing of the Excise.
- 24 December 1653 Ordinance for continuation until 3 October 1654, of the Act of Parliament of 26 March 1650, intituled An Act for Redemption of Captives (cf. Acts).
- 24 December 1653 Ordinance for the reviving of an Act of Parliament of 8 April 1653, intituled An Act for Probate of Wills and granting Administrations.
- 26 December 1653 Ordinance for alteration of several Names and Forms heretofore used in Courts, Writs, Grants, Patents, Commissions, etc., and settling of proceedings in Courts of Law, Justice and Equity, within the Commonwealth of England, Scotland, and Ireland, according to the present Government.
- 29 December 1653 Ordinance for appointing Commissioners for the better ordering and bringing in the Duty of Excise and the Arrears thereof.
- 31 December 1653 Ordinance for continuing the powers of the Commissioners for compounding, etc., the Committee for Advance of Money, and Commissioners of Indemnity (cf. Act of 29 October 1653 ).

== 1654 ==
- 19 January 1653/4 Ordinance for repealing several Acts and Resolves of Parliament made for touching the subscribing or taking the Engagement (cf, Act, 2 January 1649/50, 4 November 1653).f
- 19 January 1653/4 Ordinance declaring the offences herein mentioned and no other shall be adjudged High Treason within the Commonwealth of England, Scotland and Ireland and the Dominions thereunto belonging.
- 28 January 1653/4 Ordinance for appointing a Committee for the Army and Treasurers at war.
- 28 January 1653/4 Ordinance concerning certain details of the Monthly Assessment.
- 10 February 1653/4 Ordinance for the better ordering and disposing the Estates under sequestration.
- 17 February 1653/4 Ordinance touching the Assessing, Levying and Collecting of the latter three months' Assessment appointed by an Act of the late Parliament of 10 December 1653, entituled An Act for an Assessment at the rate of £120,000 per month for six months from the 25th December, 1653, towards the maintenance of the Armies and Navies of this Commonwealth.
- 17 February 1653/4 An Ordinance of Explanation touching Treason (cf. Ord. of 19 January 1653/4 ).
- 28 February 1653/4 Ordinance for reviving the jurisdiction of the County Palatine of Lancaster and for holding an Assize there.
- 17 March 1653/4 Ordinance for continuing the Excise.
- 20 March 1653/4 Ordinance for continuance until 26 March 1658, of the Act of Parliament of 11 March 1650/1. entituled An Act for the Continuation of the Customs until the 20 March 1653/4.
- 20 March 1653/4 Ordinance for continuation until 26 March 1655, of an Act of 27 March 1651, entituled An Act for laying an imposition upon Coles towards the building and maintaining ships for guarding the Seas.
- 20 March 1653/4 Ordinance for passing custodies of Idiots and Lunatics.
- 20 March 1653/4 Ordinance declaring that the proceedings in case of Murther in Ireland shall be as formerly.
- 20 March 1653/4 Ordinance for appointing Commissioners for a Probation of Publique Preachers.
- 23 March 1653/4 Ordinance for continuing till 1 November 1654, the Act of 12 March 1651, for impresting of seamen.
- 23 March 1653/4 Ordinance for relief of persons who have acted in the service of Parliament confirming former Acts, etc.
- 31 March 1654 Ordinance for suspending the proceedings of the Judges named in the Act of 5 October 1653, for the relief of Creditors and poor Prisoners.
- 31 March 1654 Ordinance prohibiting Cockmatches.
- 31 March 1654 Ordinance for the better amending and keeping in repair the Common Highways within the Nation.
- 3 April 1654 Ordinance for continuing until further Order an Act of Parliament of 8 April 1653, for Probate of Wills and granting administration.
- 8 April 1654 Ordinance for adjourning part of Easter Term, 1654.
- 11 April 1654 Ordinance appointing Commissioners to put in execution the Act of 1 April 1653, prohibiting the planting of Tobacco in England.
- 12 April 1654 Ordinance touching Surveyors of the Highway for this present year, 1654.
- 12 April 1654 Ordinance for uniting Scotland into one Commonwealth with England.
- 12 April 1654 Ordinance for Pardon and Grace to the People of Scotland.
- 12 April 1654 Ordinance for erecting Courts Baron in Scotland.
- 12 April 1654 Ordinance for settling the Estates of several excepted Persons in Scotland, in Trustees, to the Uses herein expressed.
- 18 April 1654 Ordinance for further suspending the proceedings of the Judges named in the Act of 5 October 1653, for the relief of creditors and poor prisoners.
- 4 May 1654 An additional Ordinance for the Excise (cf. Ordinance of 17 March 1653–4).
- 4 May 1654 Ordinance for further doubling upon and finishing the sale of Deans' and Chapters' Lands and Manors of Rectories, Glebelands, etc. (cf. Ordinance of 8 December 1646, and Acts of 30 April 1649, and 16 and 23 October 1650).
- 16 May 1654 Ordinance for continuing until the 31st May, 1654, the Ordinance of 18 April 1654, for further suspending the proceedings of the Judges named in the Act of Parliament of 5 October 1653, for relief of creditors and poor prisoners.
- 16 May 1654 Ordinance of explanation of the Ordinance of 31 March 1654, for better amending and keeping in repair the common highways within this nation.
- 26 May 1654 Ordinance for the County Court of the County of Chester to be held at Norwich during the continuance of the infection of the plague in Chester.
- 26 May 1654 Ordinance for relief of Debtors in Scotland in some cases of extremity.
- 26 May 1654 Ordinance empowering the Commissioners appointed to consider of the matter contained in the 28th Article of the Treaty with the States General, to administer an Oath.
- 26 May 1654 Ordinance for preservation of the Works of the Great Level of the Fens.
- 2 June 1654 Ordinance for an explanation touching the Jurisdiction of the Court of Admiralty (cf, Act of 2 April 1651).
- 8 June 1654 Ordinance for an assessment for six months from 24 June 1654, for maintenance of the Armies and Navies of this Commonwealth, at the rate of £120,000 per month for the first three months, and at the rate of £90,000 per month for the last three months thereof (cf. Act of 10 December 1653, and Ordinance of 17 February 1653–4).
- 9 June 1654 Ordinance for enabling the Judge or Judges of the Northern Circuit to hold Assize and Gaoldelivery at Durham.
- 9 June 1654 Ordinance for the further doubling of £2,000 upon Deans', Deans' and Chapters' Lands, Manors of Rectories, Glebe Lands, etc. (cf. Ordinance of 4 May 1654 ).
- 9 June 1654 Ordinance for relief of creditors and poor prisoners, amending and explaining the Act of 5 October 1653.
- 9 June 1654 Ordinance for reviving the Court of the Duchy of Lancaster at Westminster.
- 13 June 1654 Ordinance for establishing a High Court of Justice.
- 21 June 1654 Ordinance for bringing the Publique Revenues of this Commonwealth into one Treasury.
- 21 June 1654 Ordinance appointing who shall be Justices of Assize for the County Palatine of Lancaster.
- 23 June 1654 Ordinance amending the Ordinance of 20 March 1653–4, by giving further time for approbation of Publique Preachers.
- 23 June 1654 Ordinance for the regulation of Hackney-Coachmen in London and the places adjacent.
- 23 June 1654 Ordinance for the further encouragement of the Adventurers for Lands in Ireland, and of the soldiers and other Planters there
- 27 June 1654 Ordinance for Distribution of the Elections in Scotland.
- 27 June 1654 Ordinance for Distribution of the Elections in Ireland.
- 27 June 1654 Ordinance for Indemnity to the English Protestants of the Province of Munster in Ireland.
- 29 June 1654 Ordinance against challenges, duels and all provocations thereunto.
- 29 June 1654 Ordinance for continuing the Committee for the Army and Treasurers of War and for paying a proportion of the monthly assessment for the Navy (cf. Ordinances of 28 January 1653–4, and 8 June 1654.
- 30 June 1654 Ordinance empowering the Commissioners of the Customs and others for the better suppressing of drunkenness and prophane cursing and swearing in persons employed under them.
- 4 July 1654 Ordinance prohibiting Horse-Races for six months from 6 July 1654.
- 1 August 1654 Ordinance appointing a Committee of the Adventurers for Lands in Ireland for determining differences among the said Adventurers.
- 8 August 1654 Ordinance for the better support of the Universities in Scotland, and encouragement of Public Preachers there.
- 11 August 1654 Additional Ordinance for the relief of creditors and poor prisoners; to continue, along with the Act of 5 October 1653, and the Ordinance of 9 June 1654, until 1 December 1654.
- 11 August 1654 Ordinance for the better redress of the abuses committed upon the River of Thames and Waters of Medway.
- 21 August 1654 Ordinance for appointing Commissioners to survey the Forests, Honors, Manors, Lands, Tenements, Hereditaments within the usual limits and perambulations of the same, heretofore belonging to the late King, Queen and Prince.
- 21 August 1654 Ordinance for the better regulating and limiting the Jurisdiction of the Court of Chancery.
- 28 August 1654 Ordinance for ejecting scandalous, ignorant and insufficient ministers and schoolmasters.
- 29 August 1654 Ordinance appointing the Excise of Alum and Copperas, amending the Ordinance of 17 March. 1653–4.
- 30 August 1654 Ordinance for taking an account of the moneys received upon the Act for the better propagation and preaching of the Gospel in Wales.
- 30 August 1654 Ordinance for sale of Four Forests or Chases re served for collateral security to soldiers.
- 2 September 1654 Ordinance for the better maintenance and encouragement of Preaching Ministers, and for uniting of Parishes.
- 2 September 1654 Ordinance enabling such soldiers as have served the Commonwealth in the late wars to exercise any Trade.
- 2 September 1654 Ordinance touching the Office of Postage of Letters, Inland and Foreign.
- 2 September 1654 Ordinance giving liberty for the carrying of Millstone, Timber, Stone, etc., amending the High way Ordnance of 31 March 1654.
- 2 September 1654 Ordinance touching Fines or Writs of Covenants and Writs of Entry.
- 2 September 1654 Ordinance for further doubling upon Deans and Chapters' Lands.
- 2 September 1654 Ordinance admitting Protestants in Ireland to compound.
- 2 September 1654 Ordinance for bringing several branches of the Revenue under the managing and government of the Treasury and Court of Exchequer.
- 2 September 1654 Ordinance for reviving Acts of Parliament of 7 Jac. I. and 3 Car. I. for the recovery and preservation of many thousand acres of ground in Norfolk and Suffolk surrounded by the rage of the Sea.
- 2 September 1654 Ordinance for continuance and maintenance of the Almshouse and Almsmen called Poor Knights, and other charitable and pious uses, whereof the late Deans and Canons of Windsor were Feoffees in Trust.
- 2 September 1654 Additional Ordinance to the Ordinances of 20 March 1653–4, appointing Commissioners for approbation of Publique Preachers
- 2 September 1654 Ordinance for appointing Visitors for the Universities.

== 1655 ==
- 8 February 1654/5 Order and Declaration of the Protector with the advice of his Council for an assessment of three score thousand pounds by the month for the maintenance of the Army and Navy.
- 28 February 1654/5 Order and Declaration touching the Excise.

== 1656 ==
- 27 November 1656 Act that His Highness's Passing Bills shall not be any Determination of this Session of Parliament. Passed 27 November.
- 27 November 1656 Act for renouncing and disannulling the pretended title of Charles Stuart (passed 26 September).
- 27 November 1656 Act for the security of the Lord Protector his Person, and the continuance of the Nation in Peace and Safety (passed 9 October).
- 27 November 1656 Act for taking away the Court of Wards and Liveries (passed 22 November).
- 27 November 1656 Act for Transportation of several Commodities, of the Breed, Growth, and Manufacture of this Commonwealth (passed 26 November).

== 1657 ==
- 25 May 1657 The Humble Petition and Advice of the Knights, Citizens and Burgesses now assembled in Parliament of this Commonwealth.
- 9 June 1657 Act for taking away Purveyance and compositions for Purveyance (passed 12 December 1656).
- 9 June 1657 Act for limiting and settling the Prices of Wines.
- 9 June 1657 Act for an Assessment upon England for three months, at the rate of £60,000 per month, to commence from the 25th March 1657 (passed 4 June).
- 9 June 1657 Act for three months' Assessment in Ireland for the maintenance of the Spanish War and other services of the Commonwealth (passed 9 June).
- 9 June 1657 Act against Vagrants, and wandering, idle, dissolute Persons (passed 5 May).
- 9 June 1657 Act giving licence for transporting Fish in Foreign Bottoms (passed 30 May).
- 9 June 1657 Act for the Assuring, Confirming, and Settling of Lands and Estates in Ireland (passed 8 June).
- 9 June 1657 Act for settling the Postage in England, Scotland and Ireland (passed 9 June).
- 9 June 1657 Act for the mitigation of the rigour of the Forest Laws within the Forest of Dean in the County of Gloucester, and for the preservation of Wood and Timber in the said Forest (passed 14 March 1656–7).
- 9 June 1657 Act for settling the late Cathedral Church of Gloucester upon the Mayor and Burgesses of the City of Gloucester, and their successors, for public, religious, and charitable uses (passed 5 December 1656).
- 9 June 1657 Act for the promoting and more frequent Preaching of the Gospel and better maintenance of a godly ministry in the Borough of Plymouth (passed 14 March 1656–7).
- 9 June 1657 Act for raising money for maintenance of the Ministers in Great Yarmouth (passed 1 December 1656).
- 9 June 1657 Act for the promoting and more frequent Preaching of the Gospel and maintenance of Ministers in the City of Exeter and for the uniting of Parishes (passed 27 March 1657 ).
- 9 June 1657 Act for the provision and better maintenance of the several Ministers in the Town of Northampton (passed 12 February 1656–7).
- 9 June 1657 Act for raising maintenance for the Ministers of Newport, in the Isle of Wight (passed 30 March).
- 19 June 1657 Instructions for Forest Commissioners (agreed to 19 June).
- 26 June 1657 Act for continuing and establishing the Subsidy of Tunnage and Poundage, and for reviving an Act for the better packing of Butter and Redress of Abuses therein (cf. Ordinance of 16 December 1647, passed 23 June).
- 26 June 1657 Act and Declaration touching several Acts and Ordinances made since the 20th April 1653, and before the 3rd September 1654, and other Acts (passed 18 June).
- 26 June 1657 Act for raising £15,000 sterling in Scotland (passed 22 June).
- 26 June 1657 Act for the better observation of the Lord's Day (passed 20 June).
- 26 June 1657 Act for discovering, convicting and suppressing of Popish Recusants (passed 18 June).
- 26 June 1657 Act for Indemnifying of such persons as have acted for the service of the Public (passed 23 June).
- 26 June 1657 The Humble Additional Petition and Advice of the Knights, Citizens, and Burgesses now assembled in the Parliament of this Commonwealth (passed 25 June, sent up to Protector 26 June).
- 26 June 1657 Additional Act for the improvement of the Excise or New Impost (passed 22 June).
- 26 June 1657 Act for preventing the multiplicity of buildings in and about the Suburbs of London and within ten miles of the same (passed 20 June).
- 26 June 1657 Act for an assessment at the rate of £35,000 by the month upon England, £6,000 by the month upon Scotland, and £9,000 by the month upon Ireland, for three years from the 24th June 1657, for a temporary supply towards the maintenance of the Armies and Navies of this Commonwealth (passed 22 June).
- 26 June 1657 Act for punishing such Persons as live at high rates and have no Estates, Profession, or Calling answerable thereunto (passed 23 June).
- 26 June 1657 Act for Attainder of the Rebels in Ireland (passed 25 June).
- 26 June 1657 Act for the better suppressing of theft upon the borders of England and Scotland, and for the discovery of Highwaymen and other Felons (passed 23 June).
- 26 June 1657 Act for the quiet enjoying of sequestered Parsonages and Vicarages by the present Incumbent (passed 17 June).
- 26 June 1657 Act for the improvement of the Revenue of the Customs and Excise (passed 26 June).
- 26 June 1657 Act for the adjournment of this present Parliament from the 26th June 1657, unto the 20th January 1657 /8 (passed 26 June).
- 26 June 1657 Act for explaining a former Act of Parliament for the more frequent Preaching of the Gospel and maintenance of ministers in the City of Bristol and for supplying certain defects in the former Act (passed 26 June).
- 26 June 1657 An Act for amending the River of Owse, at and near the City of York (passed 26 June).

== 1658 ==
No acts passed.

== 1659 ==
- 11 May 1659 Act for enabling and authorising certain Persons to be Justices of the Peace, and Sheriffs (amended 7 July 1659, by a Declaration that the Act doth not extend to give Sheriffs in Scotland power to determine Civil causes, personal or real).
- 14 May 1659 Act for continuance of this present Easter Term.
- 14 May 1659 Act for the Great Seal of England.
- 18 May 1659 Act enabling such Commissioners of Sewers as acted on the 19th April 1653, to act as Commissioners of Sewers.
- 19 May 1659 Act for constituting Judges of the Admiralty.
- 19 May 1659 Act for appointing Judges for the Probate of Wills and granting administrations.
- 19 May 1659 Act for settling the Council of State.
- 26 May 1659 Act for levying and bringing in the Arrears of the Revenue due to the Commonwealth.
- 31 May 1659 Act for constituting Commissioners for ordering and managing the affairs of the Admiralty and Navy.
- 5 June 1659 Act for constituting John Bradshaw, Thomas Terryll, Esquire, and John Fountaine, Esquire, Commissioners of the Great Seal of England
- 7 June 1659 Act for constituting Charles Fleetwood, Esquire, Lieutenant-General and Commander-in-Chief of the Forces raised in England and Scotland.
- 8 June 1659 Act constituting Commissioners for nomination of Commissioner Officers for the Forces in England and Scotland and directing the granting Commissions to them.
- 18 June 1659 An Act of Assessment.
- 22 June 1659 An Additional Act for bringing in all Arrears and also the Duty of Excise, New Impost, Customs. Subsidies and Prize Goods until 1 October 1659.
- 28 June 1659 Act for impresting of Seamen.
- 28 June 1659 Act for settling the Militia of the City of Westminster and Liberties thereof and parts adjacent.
- 30 June 1659 Act for repayment of £15,000 advanced by the East India Company.
- 7 July 1659 Act for settling the Militia of the City of London and Liberties thereof, with the qualifications set forth by the Parliament on 9 May 1659.
- 7 July 1659 Act giving several powers to the Commissioners for Ireland within named, and declaring several Laws, Ordinances and Acts of Parliament to be in force in Ireland.
- 12 July 1659 An Act of Indemnity and Free Pardon.
- 13 July 1659 Act against Delinquents.
- 13 July 1659 Act for enabling Judges to hold an Assize at Durham.
- 14 July 1659 Act for settling the Militia of the Hamlets of the Tower of London.
- 14 July 1659 Act for settling the Militia in the Borough of Southwark and parts adjacent.
- 14 July 1659 Additional Act giving powers to Commissioners for the Militia of Westminster.
- 19 July 1659 Act for appointing Judges of the Admiralty (cf. Act of 19 May 1659 ).
- 19 July 1659 Act for reviving the Act of 19 May 1659, empowering Judges for Probate of Wills and Granting Administrations.
- 22 July 1659 Act for demolishing the Castle of Liverpool.
- 22 July 1659 Act for Householders to give an account of Lodgers, Horses, Arms and Ammunition.
- 26 July 1659 Act for settling the Militia in England and Wales.
- 2 August 1659 Act for appointing Commissioners for putting in execution the powers heretofore given to the Commissioners for Sequestration.
- 2 August 1659 Act enabling the Commissioners for the Militia in the City of London to raise three months' Assessment for paying for Drums, Provision and Charges incident to the said Militia.
- 5 August 1659 Act for holding an Assize for the County of Lancaster.
- 13 August 1659 Act for bringing in of second moieties upon the sale of Lands forfeited to the Commonwealth for Treason.
- 15 August 1659 Act avoiding of a Judgment and of an Act for execution of the said Judgment given against Lieut.-Col. John Lilburne.
- 27 August 1659 An Act for Sequestration.
- 27 August 1659 Act for to make good all Tryals which shall be held at Stafford on Friday, 8 September 1659, as if the same had been tried upon the 17th August 1659 (8 September amended to 9th on 29 August.
- 3 September 1659 Act for the further continuance until 7 March 1659–60, of the Act of 7. July, 1659, giving several powers to the Commissioners for Ireland withinnamed, and declaring several Laws, Ordinances and Acts of Parliament to be in force in Ireland.
- 3 September 1659 Act for empowering the Committee or Sub-Commissioners for Sequestration, or any two of them, to examine witnesses upon Oath.
- 29 September 1659 Act for the Continuance of the Customs and Excise.
- 11 October 1659 Act against the Raisings of Money upon the People, without their consent in Parliament.
- 12 October 1659 Act appointing Commissioners for the Government of the Army.
- 27 December 1659 Act for further continuance of the Excise and Customs until 8 March 1659–60.
- 28 December 1659 Act for the borrowing of £20,000 for the service of the Commonwealth.

== 1660 ==
- 2 January 1659/60 Act with instructions to be given to the Council of State.
- 2 January 1659/60 Additional Act to the Act of 28 December 1659, for borrowing £20,000 for the service of the Commonwealth.
- 26 January 1659/60 Act for an Assessment of £100,000 by the month upon England, Scotland and Ireland, for six months.
- 2 February 1659/60 Act constituting a Committee for the Army and Treasurers at War to hold office until the 10 October 1660.
- 3 February 1659/60 Act for constituting Commissioners for the better ordering and managing the Affairs of the Navy.
- 7 February 1659/60 Act for the Great Seal of Scotland.
- 7 February 1659/60 Act for the Great Seal of Ireland.
- 7 February 1659/60 Additional Act for Sequestrations.
- 11 February 1659/60 Act for appointing Commissioners for the government of the Army.
- 11 February 1659/60 Act constituting Charles Fleetwood, Esquire, to be Lieutenant-General and Commander-in-Chief of the Forces raised and to be raised by authority of Parliament.
- 16 February 1659/60 Act appointing an Engagement to be taken by the members of the Council of State.
- 18 February 1659/60 An Act concerning elections of members to serve in. Parliament.
- 24 February 1659/60 Act making void the Acts of 11 February constituting Commissioners for Government of the Army, and for making Charles Fleetwood, Esquire, Commander-in-Chief of the Land Forces.
- 25 February 1659/60 Act for constituting George Monck, Esquire, Captain-General and Commander-in-Chief under the Parliament of all the land Forces in England, Scotland and Ireland.
- 25 February 1659/60 Act for the continuance of the Customs and Excise from the 29th February 1659/60, to the 24th June 1660.
- 25 February 1659/60 Act for constituting a Council of State and repealing the Act, with Instructions for the Council of State, passed 2 January 1659/60.
- 2 March 1659/60 Act for the repeal of the two Acts of Sequestrations of 27 August 1659, and 7 February 1659/60.
- 5 March 1659/60 Act declaring the Public Confession of Faith of the Church of England.
- 7 March 1659/60 Act for explanation of certain clauses and provisos in the Act of 25 February 1659/60, for the continuance of the Customs and Excise.
- 12 March 1659/60 Act and Declaration for putting the Laws against Priests and Jesuits in speedy and efficient execution.
- 12 March 1659/60 Act for settling the Militia within England and Wales.
- 12 March 1659/60 Act for settling the Militia of the City of London.
- 14 March 1659/60 Act for Approbation and admission of Ministers of the Gospel to Benefices and Public Lectures.
- 14 March 1659/60 Act for reviving the Court of the Duchy-Chamber of Lancaster at Westminster
- 15 March 1659/60 Act for bringing in the Rents and Revenues of Delinquents' and Popish Recusants' Estates.
- 15 March 1659/60 Act for recovery of Public Debts and other Duties belonging to the Commonwealth.
- 15 March 1659/60 Act for giving power to the Council of State during the Interval, for Public Safety.
- 15 March 1659/60 Act for continuing the Terms, Process and Proceedings of the Four Courts of Justice in Ireland.
- 15 March 1659/60 Act for reviving the Act for Impresting of Seamen until the 24 June 1660
- 15 March 1659/60 Act for removing obstructions in bringing in the Assessments.
- 16 March 1659/60 Act for taking the accounts and redressing of grievances concerning the Tithes and ChurchLivings in Wales, and for Advancement of Religion and learning there.
- 16 March 1659/60 Act for ministers and Payment of Tithes.
- 16 March 1659/60 Act for dissolving from the 16 March 1659/60, the Parliament begun and holden at Westminster the 3rd November 1650, and for the calling and holding of a Parliament at Westminster on the 25th April 1660.

== See also ==
- Perfect Occurrences
