= 1600s in England =

Events from the 1600s in England. This decade marks the end of the Elizabethan era with the beginning of the Jacobean era and the Stuart period.

== Incumbents ==
- Monarch – Elizabeth I (until 24 March 1603), then James I

== Events ==
- 1600
  - January – In Ireland, Hugh O'Neill, 2nd Earl of Tyrone, renews the Nine Years' War against England with an invasion of Munster.
  - 11 February–March – Clown William Kempe ("Will Kemp") morris dances from London to Norwich.
  - c. April – Publication of Ben Jonson's play Every Man out of His Humour in London; it goes through three editions this year.
  - 5 June – Robert Devereux, 2nd Earl of Essex, former favourite of the Queen, is put on trial before a commission of 18 after being charged with malfeasance. He is deprived of his main business, a monopoly on sweet wines, and stripped of his noble title.
  - 13 June – Barrister Nicholas Fuller is granted the exclusive right to manufacture playing cards.
  - 25 June – A fire destroys much of the town of North Walsham in Norfolk, burning down 118 homes, 70 shops and most of the stalls in the market square.
  - 26 July – The original Banbury Cross is demolished on the orders of a Puritan local corporation.
  - 31 December – East India Company granted a Royal Charter for trade with Asia.
  - William Shakespeare's plays Henry IV, Part 2, Henry V, The Merchant of Venice, A Midsummer Night's Dream and Much Ado About Nothing are published in London.
  - William Gilbert publishes De Magnete in London, discussing Earth's magnetic field, one of the first important scientific works to be published in England.
  - Caister Castle falls into ruin.
- 1601
  - 7–8 January – Essex's Rebellion: Robert Devereux, 2nd Earl of Essex, stages a short-lived rebellion against Elizabeth I.
  - 25 February – Essex is executed for treason, becoming the last person beheaded on Tower Green in the Tower of London, the sword being wielded by Thomas Derrick. The sentence of co-conspirator Henry Wriothesley, 3rd Earl of Southampton, is commuted to imprisonment.
  - 5 March – The treason trial for five secondary participants in Essex's Rebellion – Gelli Meyrick, Henry Cuffe, Christopher Blount, Charles Danvers and Sir John Davies – is held in London. All five are found guilty. Meyrick and Cuffe are hanged at Tyburn on 13 March, and Blount and Danvers are beheaded at Tower Hill on 18 March. Davies is allowed to go free.
  - 22 April – 1601 East India Company Voyage: The first expedition of the East India Company, having set out from Woolwich on 13 February, sets sail from Torbay for the Spice Islands with John Davis as pilot-major.
  - Spring – Possible first performance of Shakespeare's tragedy Hamlet in London.
  - 19 September – Fourth Spanish Armada makes landfall in southern Ireland (Anglo-Spanish war and Nine Years' War (Ireland)).
  - 2 October–24 December – Siege of Kinsale by Spanish forces.
  - 27 October – The 10th Parliament of Elizabeth I (her last, summoned on 11 September) is opened. It serves until 19 December and on 30 November the Queen addresses it with her Golden Speech. An Act for the Relief of the Poor codifies the English Poor Laws.
  - 6 December – The Battle of Castlehaven is fought off the south coast of Ireland as six Spanish navy ships led by General Pedro de Zubiaur are intercepted by an English fleet of four warships led and commanded by Sir Richard Levenson. Two of the Spanish ships are sunk and the other four are run aground.
  - by December – Ben Jonson's satirical comedy Poetaster is first performed.
- 1602
  - 2 February (Candlemas night) – First recorded performance of Shakespeare's comedy Twelfth Night, in Middle Temple Hall, London.
  - 15 May – English explorer Bartholomew Gosnold, sailing in the Concord, becomes the first European at Cape Cod.
  - 3 June – Anglo-Spanish War (1585–1604): Battle of Sesimbra Bay off of the coast of Portugal – Five galleons of the English Royal Navy defeat a larger force of Spanish Navy ships.
  - 5 June – James Lancaster's 1601 East India Company Voyage arrives at Achin (modern-day Aceh) in Sumatra to deal with the local ruler. Having defeated Portugal's ally, the ruler is happy to do business, and Lancaster seizes a large Portuguese galleon and loots it.
  - 18 June – Nine Years' War (Ireland): Dunboy Castle in Ireland is taken by the English after an 11-day siege by more than 4,000 English soldiers under the command of Sir George Carew. The 143 Irish soldiers are either killed in the siege or hanged afterwards.
  - 3–4 October – Battle of the Narrow Seas: an English fleet (joined by the Dutch) pursues six Spanish galleys through the Strait of Dover.
  - 8 November – The Bodleian Library at the University of Oxford is opened.
  - November – Final judgement in Slade's Case, allowing an effective modernisation of English contract law.
  - Publication of Shakespeare's comedy The Merry Wives of Windsor, in London.
  - Richard Carew publishes The Survey of Cornwall.
- 1603

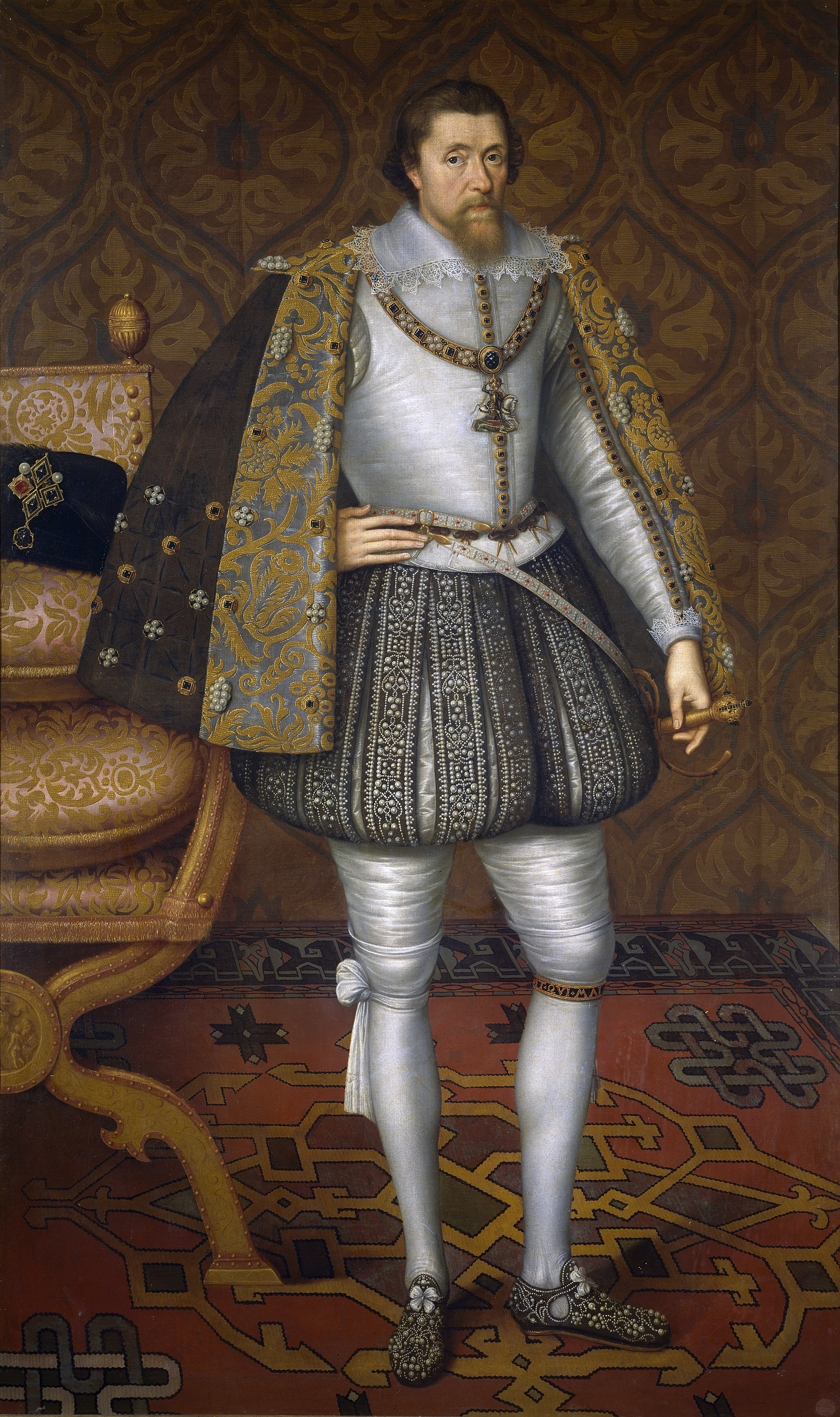
King James I of England/VI of Scotland, the first monarch to rule the Kingdoms of England and Scotland at the same time

  - 24 January – Anglo-Spanish War: English Admiral Christopher Newport leads an unsuccessful attempt to take the Spanish-controlled Caribbean island of Jamaica, where he is attempting to pillage the area to obtain supplies.
  - 24 March – Queen Elizabeth I dies at Richmond Palace aged 69, after 45 years on the throne, and is succeeded by her first cousin twice removed King James VI of Scotland (where he has ruled since 1567), hence the Union of the Crowns of Scotland and England. Elizabeth was never married and had no children, neither did her only legitimate siblings, the late Mary and Edward VI.
  - 31 March – The Nine Years' War is ended by the submission of Hugh O'Neill, Earl of Tyrone, to the English Crown and the signing of the Treaty of Mellifont.
  - 5 April – James VI and I sets out from Edinburgh for London.
  - April – Thomas Cartwright delivers his Millenary Petition, demanding an end to ritualistic practices, allegedly signed by 1,000 Puritan ministers, to the King, who is en route to London.
  - c. April – 1603 London plague: Outbreak of bubonic plague epidemic in London in which between 29,000 and 40,000 die. The theatres are closed.
  - 28 April – Funeral of Elizabeth I in Westminster Abbey.
  - 7 May – King James arrives in London, where he is enthusiastically received.
  - 19 May – The London acting company previously known as the Lord Chamberlain's Men comes under the patronage of the new monarch and is chartered as the King's Men. William Shakespeare is among them.
  - 24 June – Planned date for "Bye Plot", a conspiracy to kidnap King James in the interest of tolerance for Roman Catholic priests and Puritans.
  - July – "Main Plot", an alleged conspiracy by English courtiers to remove James from the English throne and to replace him with his cousin Lady Arbella Stuart.
  - 17 July – Sir Walter Raleigh is arrested for treason in connection with the "Main Plot".
  - 21 July – Thomas Howard is created the 1st Earl of Suffolk.
  - 25 July – Coronation of James I and Anne as King and Queen of England in Westminster Abbey. Ceremonies are restricted because of plague.
  - 1 August – Members of Parliament and kinsmen Sir Matthew Browne and Sir John Townshend fight a horseback duel on Hounslow Heath, near London, which is fatal to both.
  - September–October – The court is in residence in Winchester due to the London plague.
  - November–December – The court is in residence at Wilton House in Wiltshire due to the London plague.
  - 17 November – Raleigh goes on trial for treason in the converted Great Hall of Winchester Castle. He is found guilty but his life is spared by the King at this time and he is returned to imprisonment in the Tower of London.
  - 2 December – The King's Men perform a play for the court at Wilton House, perhaps As You Like It.
- 1604
  - 1 January – The earliest recorded performance of William Shakespeare's comedy A Midsummer Night's Dream (probably premiered in 1595–96) takes place at Hampton Court.
  - 14–16 January – Hampton Court Conference with James I, the Anglican bishops and representatives of Puritans. Work begins on the Authorized King James Version of the Bible and revision of the Book of Common Prayer.
  - 17 February – James I issues an order for all Jesuits and Roman Catholic priests to leave his kingdom by March 19.
  - 15 March – The King and Queen make their formal Royal Entry to London.
  - 19 March – The "Blessed Parliament" assembles at Westminster and debates Robert Cecil's proposal, brought forward according to the King's desire, for union with Scotland.
  - 1 May – James I and Anne of Denmark are treated to A Private Entertainment of the King and Queen on May-Day at Highgate.
  - 2 April – Speaker of the House of Commons Sir Edward Phelips rules that members of the House may not bring forward an identical (or near-identical) motion to one that has already been decided in that same session.
  - 20 May – Gunpowder Plot: Five Catholic conspirators, led by Robert Catesby, who has invited Thomas Wintour, John Wright, Thomas Percy and Guy Fawkes, meet at the Duck and Drake Inn in London to make a plan for the assassination of King James.
  - 20 May–16 July – 18 sessions of discussion between England and Spain at Somerset House in London agree a peace treaty to end the Anglo-Spanish War (1585–1604).
  - 20 June – The Form of Apology and Satisfaction is read out in the House of Commons to justify the conduct of Parliament following a dispute between King and Parliament over a contested election in Buckinghamshire.
  - 18 August – The Treaty of London brings an end to the Anglo–Spanish War.
  - 4 July – The Jesuits etc. Act 1603 (An Act for the due execution of the Statutes against Jesuits, seminary Priests and recusants) is given royal assent, creating penalties against Jesuits and Catholics who send their children abroad to Catholic colleges.
  - 7 July – Parliament prorogued, after failing to grant the King all the subsidies he has asked for.
  - Before 1 October – Huntingdon Beaumont completes the Wollaton Wagonway, built to transport coal from the mines at Strelley to Wollaton just west of Nottingham, the world's oldest wagonway with provenance.
  - 20 October – King James assumes the style king of Great Britain.
  - 1 November (Hallowmas day) – First recorded performance of Shakespeare's tragedy Othello, at Whitehall Palace in London.
  - 10 December – Richard Bancroft (a leading participant in the King James Version Bible translation) is installed as Archbishop of Canterbury.
  - Christopher Marlowe's play The Tragicall History of D. Faustus (probably written and first performed between 1588/89 and Marlowe's death in 1593) is published in London.
  - King James publishes A Counterblaste to Tobacco.
  - Table Alphabeticall, the first known English dictionary to be organised by alphabetical ordering, is published.
  - Blundell's School is founded in Tiverton, Devon, under the will of merchant Peter Blundell.
- 1605
  - 10 April – Spanish Catholic missionary Luisa Carvajal y Mendoza arrives in England.
  - October – Publication of Francis Bacon's treatise The Advancement of Learning.
  - 5 November – Gunpowder Plot: a plot to blow up the Houses of Parliament is foiled when, following an anonymous tip-off (passed to Lord Monteagle in October), Sir Thomas Knyvet, a justice of the peace, finds Catholic plotter Guy Fawkes in a cellar below the Parliament building and orders a search of the area, finding 36 barrels of gunpowder. Fawkes is arrested for trying to kill King James I and the members who were scheduled to sit together in Parliament the next day. Fawkes speaks the legendary words: "Remember, remember, the Fifth of November".
  - 8 November – Gunpowder Plot conspirator Robert Catesby is among those shot while plotters are being arrested at Holbeche House in the west midlands.

First version of the Union Flag, see 12 April 1606

- 1606
  - 27 January – Catholic priest Henry Garnet is arrested at Hindlip Hall in Worcestershire.
  - 31 January – Fawkes and three of his co-plotters are executed by hanging, drawing and quartering in London, four having been executed the previous day.
  - 24 February – Commercial treaty between England and France signed in Paris.
  - 28 March – Catholic priest Henry Garnet is tried for misprision of treason at Guildhall, London, in connection with the Gunpowder Plot, and found guilty. Discussion of equivocation plays a significant part in his questioning and trial. On 3 May he is hanged at St Paul's Churchyard in London.
  - 10 April – Charter of 1606: The First Charter of Virginia is adopted, by which King James I of England grants rights to the Virginia Company (comprising the London Company and Plymouth Company) to settle parts of the east coast of North America.
  - 12 April – First version of the Union Flag created, designed by Charles Howard, 1st Earl of Nottingham, to be worn at the maintopmast of English and Scots ships.
  - Spring – Ben Jonson's satiric play Volpone first performed, in London.
  - 27 May – Severe penalties are imposed for Catholic recusancy, and for refusal to take an Oath of Allegiance to James to serve in public office, under terms of the Popish Recusants Act 1605 (An Act for the better discovering and repressing of popish recusants, proclaimed law 22 June).
  - 27 May – Second session of Parliament under King James prorogued.
  - 10 July – 47 Roman Catholic priests, including Thomas Garnet, are deported to Flanders on pain of death if they return to England.
  - 24 July – King Christian IV of Denmark, as the guest of his brother-in-law James I, is welcomed to London and the two monarchs are driven by coaches to a banquet at Theobalds House at Cheshunt, Hertfordshire. They are entertained by Ben Jonson's play, The Entertainment of the Kings of Great Britain and Denmark. On 31 July they see a play by John Marston.
  - 7 August – Possible first performance of Shakespeare's tragedy Macbeth, in London.
  - 18 November – Third session of Parliament begins.
  - 19 December – The Susan Constant sets out from the River Thames leading the Virginia Company's fleet for the foundation of Jamestown, Virginia.
  - 26 December (Saint Stephen's night) – One of the first performance of Shakespeare's tragedy King Lear, before the King at Whitehall.
  - Paston School founded in Norfolk.
- 1607
  - 30 January – Coastal flooding around Britain, probably a storm surge, including Bristol Channel floods in which a massive wave sweeps along the Bristol Channel, killing an estimated 2,000 people, with 200 square miles (518 km^{2}) of farmland inundated.
  - late April – Start of Midland Revolt against land enclosures. The rebels are referred to as "Levellers".
  - 14 May – Jamestown, Virginia, is established as the first permanent English settlement in North America.
  - 8 June – Midland Revolt suppressed at Newton, Northamptonshire, by local gentry.
  - 4 July – Third session of Parliament ends, having refused a proposed union with the Parliament of Scotland. It does not assemble again until 1610.
  - September – The Scrooby Congregation of Protestant Separatists from Nottinghamshire attempt to flee to the Dutch Republic from The Haven, Boston, but are betrayed, arrested and imprisoned for a time.
  - 14 September – Flight of the Earls from Ireland: Hugh O'Neill, 2nd Earl of Tyrone, and Rory O'Donnell, 1st Earl of Tyrconnell, flee to Spain to avoid capture by the English crown, thus facilitating the Plantation of Ulster with English and Scots settlers.
  - November – Case of Prohibitions: Sir Edward Coke determines that legal cases should not be tried by the monarch.
  - 5 December–14 February 1608 – Severe frost. Many rivers, including the Thames, freeze.
  - First performance of the first wholly parodic play in English, Francis Beaumont's The Knight of the Burning Pestle, unsuccessfully, probably by the Children of the Chapel at the Blackfriars Theatre in London.
- 1608
  - Spring – The Scrooby Congregation successfully flees to the Dutch Republic from the Humber, origin of the Pilgrim Fathers who in 1620 move on to North America.
  - April – Performances of George Chapman's new play The Conspiracy and Tragedy of Charles, Duke of Byron by the Children of the Chapel at the Blackfriars Theatre in London are suppressed after the French Ambassador complains to King James. After June the play is published with the offensive passages suppressed.
  - July–December – Plague in London (which recurs in the two following years).
  - c. October – Thomas Middleton's city comedy A Mad World, My Masters published in London.
  - Muster rolls are compiled in the counties.
  - Traditional date – Golf first played in England, at Blackheath, London.
- 1609
  - 20 May – London publisher Thomas Thorpe issues Shake-speares Sonnets, with a dedication to "Mr. W.H.", and the poem A Lover's Complaint appended; it is uncertain whether this publication has Shakespeare's authority.
  - 25 July – The London Company's ship Sea Venture, en route to relieve the Jamestown settlement, is driven ashore in Bermuda, thus effectively first settling the colony.
  - 26 July – English scientist Thomas Harriot becomes the first to draw an astronomical object after viewing it through a telescope: he draws a map of the Moon, preceding Galileo by several months.
  - 28 August – English explorer Henry Hudson sailing the Halve Maen in the service of the Dutch East India Company finds Delaware Bay.
  - 11–12 September – Hudson sails into Upper New York Bay and begins a journey up the Hudson River.
  - 12 October – A version of the rhyme "Three Blind Mice" is published in Deuteromelia or The Seconde part of Musicks melodie (London). The editor, and possible author of the verse, is the teenage Thomas Ravenscroft. This collection follows his publication of the first rounds in English, Pammelia.
  - Plantation of Ulster proceeds: Protestant English and Scots settlers take over forfeited estates of rebel leaders.
  - Trinity House establishes its first lighthouses, at Lowestoft.
  - Publication of Pericles, Prince of Tyre in London with attribution to Shakespeare.

== Births ==
- 1600
  - February – Edmund Calamy the Elder, presbyterian (died 1666)
  - 26 June – Sir Richard Grenville, 1st Baronet, Royalist leader (died 1658)
  - November – John Ogilby, writer and cartographer (died 1676)
  - William Prynne, puritan politician (died 1669)
  - Brian Walton, divine and scholar (died 1661)
  - probable date – Dud Dudley, ironmaster (died 1684)
- 1601
  - 12 January – Adrian Scrope, Parliamentarian colonel and regicide (executed 1660)
  - May – Spencer Compton, 2nd Earl of Northampton (died 1643)
  - Peter Chamberlen, physician (died 1683)
- 1602
  - 29 March – John Lightfoot, churchman and rabbinical scholar (died 1675)
  - April – William Lawes, composer and musician (died 1645)
  - 1 May – William Lilly, astrologer (died 1681)
  - 12 July – John Bradshaw, judge and regicide (died 1659)
  - 12 October – William Chillingworth, churchman (died 1644)
  - 13 October – Algernon Percy, 10th Earl of Northumberland, military leader (died 1668)
  - 18 December – Simonds d'Ewes, antiquarian and politician (died 1650)
  - John Berkeley, 1st Baron Berkeley of Stratton (died 1678)
  - John Greaves, mathematician and antiquary (died 1652)
  - Edward Montagu, 2nd Earl of Manchester, Parliamentary commander (died 1671)
  - Henry Marten, lawyer and politician, regicide (died 1680)
  - Dudley North, 4th Baron North, politician (died 1677)
  - Owen Feltham, religious writer (died 1668)
- 1602 or 1603
  - 9 March – Edward Somerset, 2nd Marquess of Worcester (died 1667)
- 1603
  - 21 January – Shackerley Marmion, dramatist (died 1639)
  - 27 January – Harbottle Grimston, politician (died 1685)
  - 18 March – Simon Bradstreet, colonial magistrate (died 1697)
  - 11 July – Kenelm Digby, privateer and alchemist (died 1665)
  - 20 November (bapt.) – Daniel Blagrave, Member of Parliament (died 1668)
  - 21 December – Roger Williams, theologian and colonist (died 1684)
  - John Ashburnham, Royalist Member of Parliament (died 1671)
- 1604
  - 29 May (bapt.) – Isaac Ambrose, Puritan divine (died 1664)
  - 3 August – John Eliot, puritan missionary (died 1690)
  - 13 September – William Brereton, soldier and politician (died 1661)
  - 8 November (bapt.) – Edward Pococke, Orientalist and biblical scholar (died 1691)
  - 23 November (bapt.) – Jasper Mayne, dramatist (died 1672)
- 1605
  - 1 March – James Wriothesley, Lord Wriothesley, politician (died on active service 1624)
  - June – Thomas Randolph, poet and dramatist (died 1635)
  - August – Bulstrode Whitelocke, lawyer and parliamentarian (died 1675)
  - 8 August – Cecilius Calvert, 2nd Baron Baltimore, colonial Governor of Maryland (died 1675)
  - 18 August – Henry Hammond, churchman (died 1660)
  - 12 September – William Dugdale, antiquary (died 1686)
  - 19 October – Thomas Browne, physician and philosopher (died 1682)
  - 4 November – William Habington, poet (died 1654)
  - William Berkeley, governor of Virginia (died 1677)
  - Approximate date
    - John Gauden, bishop and writer (died 1662)
    - William Goffe, parliamentarian and regicide (died 1679)
    - Thomas Nabbes, dramatist (died 1641)
    - Francis Willoughby, 5th Baron Willoughby of Parham (died 1666)
- 1606
  - 4 January (bapt.) – Edmund Castell, orientalist (died 1685)
  - 28 February – William Davenant, poet and playwright (died 1668)
  - March – Henry Pierrepont, 1st Marquess of Dorchester (died 1680)
  - 3 March – Edmund Waller, poet (died 1687)
  - 27 September – Richard Busby, clergyman (died 1695)
  - 4 November (bapt.) – Thomas Herbert, traveller and historian (died 1682)
  - John Robartes, 1st Earl of Radnor, politician (died 1685)
  - Approximate date
    - Leonard Calvert, governor of Baltimore (died 1647)
    - Joan Carlile, née Palmer, professional portrait painter (died 1679)
    - Thomas Washbourne, clergyman and poet (died 1687)
- 1607
  - 31 January – James Stanley, 7th Earl of Derby, Royalist noble (executed 1651)
  - 5 April (bapt.) – John Boys, Royalist soldier, Lord Warden of the Cinque Ports (died 1664)
  - 10 March – Thomas Wriothesley, 4th Earl of Southampton, statesman (died 1667)
  - 26 November – John Harvard, clergyman and colonist (died 1638)
  - John Dixwell, judge and regicide (died 1689)
- 1608
  - 15 April – John Huddleston, Catholic clergyman (died 1698)
  - 20 April – Edward Rainbowe, clergyman and preacher (died 1684)
  - June – Richard Fanshawe, diplomat (died 1666)
  - 19 June – Thomas Fuller, churchman and historian (died 1661)
  - 14 July – George Goring, Lord Goring, Royalist soldier (died 1657)
  - 4 August – John Tradescant the Younger, botanist and gardener (died 1662)
  - 13 November – John Desborough, soldier and politician (died 1680)
  - 6 December – George Monck, 1st Duke of Albemarle, soldier (died 1670)
  - 9 December – John Milton, poet (died 1674)
  - Thomas Barlow, Bishop of Lincoln (died 1691)
- 1609
  - 10 February – John Suckling, poet (died 1642)
  - 18 February – Edward Hyde, 1st Earl of Clarendon, historian and statesman (died 1674)
  - 29 March – Sarah Boyle, noblewoman (died 1633)
  - 8 October – John Clarke, physician (died 1676)
  - 19 October – Gerrard Winstanley, Protestant religious reformer (died 1676)
  - 26 October – William Sprague, co-founder of Charlestown, Massachusetts (died 1675)
  - 1 November – Matthew Hale, Lord Chief Justice (died 1676)
  - 24 December – Philip Warwick, writer and politician (died 1683)
  - Samuel Cooper, miniature painter (died 1672)

== Deaths ==
- 1600
  - April – Thomas Deloney, writer (born 1543)
  - 3 November – Richard Hooker, Anglican theologian (born 1554)
- 1601
  - 19 January – Henry Herbert, 2nd Earl of Pembroke, statesman (born 1534)
  - 25 February – Robert Devereux, 2nd Earl of Essex, politician (born 1566)
  - 27 February – Anne Line, Catholic martyr (executed) (born c. 1563)
  - 7 September – John Shakespeare, glover and farmer, father of William Shakespeare (born 1529)
- 1602
  - 13 February – Alexander Nowell, clergyman (born 1507)
  - October – Thomas Morley, composer (born 1557)
  - 29 November – Anthony Holborne, composer (born c. 1545)
- 1603
  - 15 January – Catherine Carey, Lady in waiting to Elizabeth I of England (year of birth unknown)
  - 24 March – Queen Elizabeth I (born 1533)
  - 8 September – George Carey, 2nd Baron Hunsdon, politician (born 1547)
  - 28 October (burial) – Ralph Lane, explorer (born 1530)
  - 9 December – William Watson, Catholic priest and conspirator (executed) (born 1559)
  - 10 December – William Gilbert, scientist (plague) (born 1544)
  - 27 December – Thomas Cartwright, Puritan clergyman (born c. 1535)
  - Edward Fenton, navigator (year of birth unknown)
  - Probable date – Will Kempe, comic performer (year of birth unknown)
- 1604
  - early – Thomas North, translator of Plutarch (born 1535)
  - 29 February – John Whitgift, Archbishop of Canterbury (born 1530)
  - 1 April – Thomas Churchyard, author (born 1520)
  - 24 June – Edward de Vere, 17th Earl of Oxford, politician (born 1550)
  - November – Thomas Storer, poet (born 1571)
  - 3 December – George Hastings, 4th Earl of Huntingdon (born 1540)
  - late – Richard Topcliffe, Member of Parliament and torturer (born 1532)
- 1605
  - 5 April – Adam Loftus, Catholic archbishop (born c. 1533)
  - 6 April – John Stow, historian and antiquarian (born 1525)
  - 11 September – Sir Thomas Tresham, politician (born 1550)
  - 8 November – Robert Catesby, conspirator (born 1573)
  - December – Francis Tresham, conspirator (born 1567)
  - 29 December – John Davis, explorer (born 1550)
- 1606
  - 30 January
    - Everard Digby, conspirator (executed) (born 1578)
    - Robert Wintour, conspirator (executed) (born 1565)
  - 31 January
    - Guy Fawkes, conspirator (executed) (born 1570)
    - Ambrose Rokewood, conspirator (executed) (born c. 1578)
    - Thomas Wintour, conspirator (executed) (born 1571)
  - 1/2 March – Nicholas Owen, carpenter and Jesuit lay brother (executed) (born c. 1562)
  - 3 April – Charles Blount, 1st Earl of Devon, politician (born 1563)
  - 7 April – Edward Oldcorne, Jesuit (executed) (born 1561)
  - 3 May – Henry Garnet, Jesuit (executed) (born 1561)
  - 20 November (burial) – John Lyly, writer (born 1553)
  - Approximate date – Henry Chettle, writer (born 1564)
- 1607
  - May – Edward Dyer, courtier and poet (born 1543)
  - 21 May – John Rainolds, scholar and Bible translator (born 1549)
  - 10 June – John Popham, Lord Chief Justice (born 1553)
  - 7 July – Penelope Blount, Countess of Devonshire (born 1562)
  - 22 August – Bartholomew Gosnold, explorer and privateer (born 1572)
  - 20 December – Sir John Bourke of Brittas, Irish recusant (executed) (born 1550)
- 1608
  - 13 February – Bess of Hardwick, Countess of Shrewsbury (born 1527)
  - 26 February – John Still, bishop (born c. 1543)
  - 29 March – Laurence Tomson, Calvinist theologian (born 1539)
  - 19 April – Thomas Sackville, 1st Earl of Dorset, statesman and poet (born 1536)
  - c. 24 August – Edmund Whitelocke, soldier and courtier (born 1565)
  - 19 October – Geoffrey Fenton, writer and politician (born c. 1539)
  - December
    - John Dee, mathematician, astronomer, and geographer (born 1527)
    - William Davison, secretary to Queen Elizabeth I of England (born c. 1541)
- 1609
  - 9 March – William Warner, poet (born c. 1558)
  - December – Barnabe Barnes, poet (born c. 1571)
