= 1757 in Great Britain =

Events from the year 1757 in Great Britain.

== Incumbents ==
- Monarch – George II
- Prime Minister – William Cavendish, 4th Duke of Devonshire (Whig) (until 25 June); Thomas Pelham-Holles, 1st Duke of Newcastle (Whig) (starting 2 July)

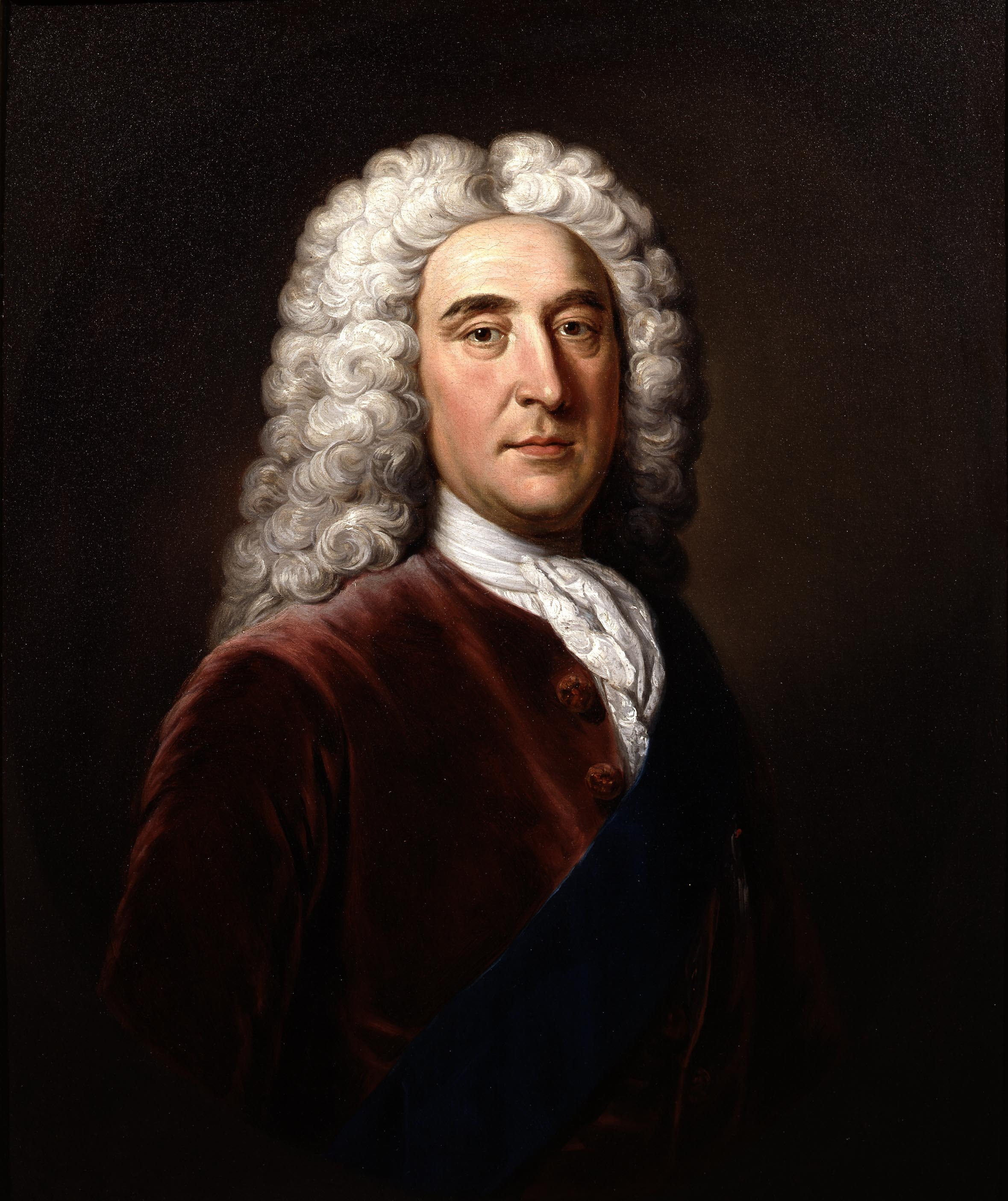
Thomas Pelham-Holles, 1st Duke of Newcastle

== Events ==
- 2 January – Seven Years' War: The British East India Company Army, under the command of Robert Clive, captures Calcutta in India.
- 14 March – Seven Years' War: Admiral Sir John Byng is executed by firing squad aboard HMS Monarch in The Solent after his court martial conviction for breach of the Articles of War in failing in the Battle of Minorca (1756) to save British troops who had been besieged by a numerically superior French force in the Siege of Fort St Philip (1756). The execution is largely opposed by the Admiralty and the House of Commons. General Edward Cornwallis, the ranking British Army officer at the battle, is exonerated of charges of dereliction of duty, but his career is ruined.
- 29 March – Matthew Hutton is nominated as Archbishop of Canterbury, being translated from York.
- 6 April – William Pitt resigns from the government after Prince William, Duke of Cumberland refuses to command the British forces in Germany in the Seven Years' War and following several military reverses in Britain's fight against France in America. A Caretaker Ministry takes power led by William Cavendish, 4th Duke of Devonshire. Pitt is recalled to government in early July.
- 6 May – asylum confinement of Christopher Smart: poet Christopher Smart is confined to St Luke's Hospital for Lunatics in London.
- May – the Baskerville typeface, designed by John Baskerville of Birmingham, is first used in a wove paper quarto edition of Virgil.
- 23 June – Battle of Plassey: 3000 British troops under Robert Clive defeat a 50,000 strong Indian army under Siraj ud-Daulah at Plassey.
- 2 July – the Duke of Newcastle is asked to form a new government of Great Britain and fills the office of Prime Minister, after his forced resignation eight months earlier. Pitt is recalled in a coalition to conduct Britain's foreign and military affairs and given greater control.
- 26 July – Seven Years' War: Battle of Hastenbeck: An Anglo-Hanoverian army under the Duke of Cumberland is defeated by the French under Louis d'Estrées and forced out of Hanover.
- 3–9 August – French and Indian War: At the Battle of Fort William Henry a French army under Louis-Joseph de Montcalm forces the British to surrender Fort William Henry. The French army's Indian allies slaughter the survivors, not understanding the terms of the surrender.
- 8 September – the Convention of Klosterzeven is signed at the Lower Saxony town of Bremervörde by the Duke of Cumberland following his defeat at the 26 July Battle of Hastenbeck by the French Army Marshal, the Duke of Richelieu. The treaty provides for the Army of the Electorate of Hanover to be reduced to a token force and for the French Army to occupy Hanover and most of northwest Germany. At this time, King George II of Great Britain is also the Elector of Hanover, and it is later said that "The terms proved worse than either George or his ministers had wanted or expected."
- 23 September – the "Raid on Rochefort" is carried out as a pre-emptive strike by Great Britain to neutralize France's Arsenal de Rochefort before the French Navy can carry out plans to invade England. Led by Royal Navy Admiral Edward Hawke, HMS Neptune and six other vessels sail in and capture the Île-d'Aix and its battery of cannons, effectively blocking the departure of any ships from the mouth of the Charante river.
- 24 December – the Pratt-Yorke opinion distinguishes overseas territories acquired by conquest from those acquired by private treaty: while the Crown of Great Britain enjoys sovereignty over both, only the property of the former is vested in the Crown.
- The government reduces the annual interest payable on Consolidated Annuities (consols) from 3.5% to 3%, where it will remain until 1888.

== Publications ==
- Edmund Burke's treatise A Philosophical Enquiry into the Origin of Our Ideas of the Sublime and Beautiful.
- Harris's List of Covent Garden Ladies, the annual directory of London prostitutes, is first published.

== Births ==
- 1 February – John Philip Kemble, actor (died 1823)
- 20 February – John 'Mad Jack' Fuller, philanthropist (died 1834)
- 9 April – Edward Pellew, 1st Viscount Exmouth, admiral (died 1833)
- 30 May – Henry Addington, 1st Viscount Sidmouth, Prime Minister of the United Kingdom (died 1844)
- 22 June – George Vancouver, explorer (died 1798)
- 9 August – Thomas Telford, engineer (died 1834)
- 13 August – James Gillray, caricaturist (died 1815)
- 14 October – Charles Abbot, 1st Baron Colchester, barrister, statesman, Speaker of the Houser of Commons (died 1829)
- 13 November – Archibald Alison, Scottish author (died 1839)
- 27 November – Mary Robinson, poet, actress and royal mistress (died 1800)
- 28 November – William Blake, poet and artist (died 1827)
- date unknown – Sir Thomas Foley, Welsh admiral (died 1833)

== Deaths ==
- 15 January – George Gilmer, Sr., politician (born 1700)
- 19 January – Thomas Ruddiman, Scottish classical scholar (born 1664)
- 5 February – Horatio Walpole, 1st Baron Walpole of Wolterton, English diplomat (born 1678)
- 1 March – Edward Moore, writer (born 1712)
- 8 March – Thomas Blackwell, Scottish classical scholar (born 1701)
- 14 March – John Byng, admiral (executed) (born 1704)
- 6 May – Charles FitzRoy, 2nd Duke of Grafton, politician (born 1683)
- 28 August – David Hartley, English philosopher (born 1705)
- 21 October (bur.) – Rhoda Delaval, portrait painter (born 1725)
- 11 December
  - Colley Cibber, English poet laureate and actor-manager (born 1671)
  - Edmund Curll, English bookseller and publisher (born 1675)

== See also ==
- 1757 in Wales
