= 1748 in Great Britain =

Events from the year 1748 in Great Britain.

== Incumbents ==
- Monarch – George II
- Prime Minister – Henry Pelham (Whig)

== Events ==
- 28 March – a fire in the City of London causes over a million pounds worth of damage.
- April – first uniforms of the Royal Navy introduced for commissioned officers and midshipmen.
- August – Admiral Edward Boscawen commands a Royal Navy siege of Pondicherry.
- 18 October – the Treaty of Aix-la-Chapelle ends the War of the Austrian Succession, by which Madras in India is restored to British rule in exchange for the fortress of Louisbourg in Canada with France.

=== Undated ===
- Adam Smith begins to deliver public lectures in Edinburgh.
- Henry Fielding organises the forerunner of the Bow Street Runners, with eight men at first.
- John Fothergill's pamphlet Account of the Sore Throat attended with Ulcers contains the first description of diphtheria.
- Holywell Music Room, Oxford, the first purpose-built concert hall in Europe, is opened.

== Publications ==
- While in debtor's prison, John Cleland writes the erotic novel Fanny Hill (Memoirs of a Woman of Pleasure), the first part of which is published anonymously on 21 November.
- David Hume's philosophical treatise An Enquiry concerning Human Understanding.
- Samuel Richardson's anonymous epistolary novel Clarissa.
- Tobias Smollett's anonymous picaresque novel The Adventures of Roderick Random.
- James Thomson's poem The Castle of Indolence, shortly before his death.

== Births ==
- 15 February – Jeremy Bentham, philosopher and writer (died 1832)
- 5 March – William Shield, violinist and composer (died 1829)
- 10 March – John Playfair, scientist (died 1819)
- 13 April – Joseph Bramah, inventor and locksmith (died 1814)
- 28 May – Frederick Howard, 5th Earl of Carlisle (died 1825)
- August – James Sayers, caricaturist (died 1823)
- 14 December – William Cavendish, 5th Duke of Devonshire (died 1811)

=== Unknown date ===
- George Dixon, sea captain and explorer (died 1796)
- Matchem, racehorse (died 1781)

== Deaths ==
- 14 March – George Wade, military leader (born 1673 in Ireland)
- 12 April – William Kent, architect, landscape architect and furniture designer (born c. 1685)
- 12 May – Thomas Lowndes, astronomer (born 1692)
- 27 August – James Thomson, poet (born 1700 in Scotland)
- 6 September – Edmund Gibson, Bishop of London and scholar (born 1669)
- 12 September – Anne Bracegirdle, actress (born c.1671)
- 21 September – John Balguy, philosopher (born 1686)
- 26 October – Donald Cameron of Lochiel, exiled Jacobite clan chief (born 1700 in Scotland)
- 25 November – Isaac Watts, hymn writer (born 1674)
- 2 December – Charles Seymour, 6th Duke of Somerset, politician (born 1662)

== See also ==
- 1748 in Wales
