= 1751 in Great Britain =

Events from the year 1751 in Great Britain.

== Incumbents ==
- Monarch – George II
- Prime Minister – Henry Pelham (Whig)

== Events ==
- 25 March – legally New Year's Day for the last time in England and Wales.
- 31 March – Frederick, Prince of Wales dies at Leicester House, London from a lung injury and is succeeded by his son the future George III of the United Kingdom as heir apparent to the throne; three weeks later George is made Prince of Wales. George's mother, Princess Augusta of Saxe-Gotha, becomes Dowager Princess of Wales.
- April – the Gin Act requires government inspection of distilleries and restricts sale to licensed premises.
- 27 May – adoption of the Gregorian calendar: royal assent is given to An Act for Regulating the Commencement of the Year; and for Correcting the Calendar now in Use (the "Calendar Act") passed by Parliament, introducing the Gregorian Calendar, correcting the eleven-day difference between Old Style and New Style dates and making 1 January legally New Year's Day from 1752 in the British Empire. It is largely promoted by George Parker, 2nd Earl of Macclesfield.
- 4 June – Dr John Wall and partners establish a porcelain factory in Worcester, "The Worcester Tonquin Manufactory", the origin of Royal Worcester.
- 31 August – Robert Clive takes the Indian town of Arcot from the French.
- 20 October – Charles, Duke of Bolton, marries celebrated actress Lavinia Fenton, already the mother of his three children.
- 3 December – Battle of Arnee: Robert Clive defeats a Franco-Indian force.

=== Undated ===
- A British settlement is founded in Georgetown in North America.
- Newcastle Infirmary founded in Newcastle upon Tyne.
- A new Lizard Lighthouse is built in Cornwall.
- William Hogarth engraves the prints Gin Lane, Beer Street and The Four Stages of Cruelty.

== Publications ==
- 15 February – Thomas Gray's anonymous Elegy Written in a Country Church-Yard.
- Henry Fielding's novel Amelia.
- Eliza Haywood's anonymous novel The History of Miss Betsy Thoughtless.
- David Hume's book An Enquiry Concerning the Principles of Morals.
- Tobias Smollett's anonymous picaresque novel The Adventures of Peregrine Pickle.

== Births ==
- 31 January – Priscilla Wakefield (née Bell), Quaker writer and philanthropist (died 1832)
- 2 May – John André, soldier (died 1780)
- 4 June – John Scott, 1st Earl of Eldon, Lord Chancellor (died 1838)
- 11 July – Caroline Matilda of Great Britain, posthumously-born daughter of Frederick, Prince of Wales and later queen consort of Denmark (died 1775)
- 30 October – Richard Brinsley Sheridan, Irish-born dramatist and politician (died 1816)
- 14 November – Capel Lofft, lawyer, writer and astronomer (died 1824 in France)
- date unknown
  - Helen Craik, Scottish novelist and poet (died 1825) (probable year)
  - Thomas Sheraton, furniture designer (died 1806)

== Deaths ==
- 20 January – John Hervey, 1st Earl of Bristol, politician (born 1665)
- 29 March – Thomas Coram, sea captain and philanthropist (born c.1668)
- 31 March
  - Frederick, Prince of Wales (born 1707)
  - Robert Walpole, 2nd Earl of Orford (born 1701)
- 9 June – John Machin, mathematician and astronomer (b. c.1686)
- 22 August – Andrew Gordon, Scottish-born Benedictine monk, physicist and inventor (born 1712)
- 2 October – Thomas Mathews, Welsh admiral (born 1676)
- 26 October – Philip Doddridge, nonconformist religious leader (born 1702)
- 12 December – Henry St John, 1st Viscount Bolingbroke, statesman and philosopher (born 1678)
- 17 December – Sir William Gooch, 1st Baronet, Governor of Virginia (born 1681)
- 19 December – Louise of Great Britain, English-born queen of Frederick V of Denmark (born 1724)

== See also ==
- 1751 in Wales
