= 1737 in Great Britain =

Events from the year 1737 in Great Britain.

== Incumbents ==
- Monarch – George II
- Regent – Caroline, Queen Consort (until 14 January)
- Prime Minister – Robert Walpole (Whig)

== Events ==
- January – John Potter appointed as Archbishop of Canterbury (installed 28 February).
- 2 March – Samuel Johnson and his former pupil David Garrick leave Lichfield to seek their fortunes in London.
- 17 May – construction of the circular Radcliffe Library at the University of Oxford begins.
- 28 May – the planet Venus passes in front of Mercury. The event is witnessed during the evening by amateur astronomer John Bevis at the Royal Greenwich Observatory. As of 2006, it is the only such planet/planet occultation to be directly observed.
- 21 June – the Licensing Act requires plays to be submitted to the Lord Chamberlain for censorship and reduces the number of legitimate theatres.
- 10 October – King George II expels Frederick, Prince of Wales from the royal court for criticising the government.
- c. 3 November – Alexander Cruden's A Complete Concordance to the Holy Scriptures of the Old and New Testament first published.
- December – Bristol Infirmary admits its first patients. This year, Aberdeen Royal Infirmary was founded.
- Undated
  - Welsh Methodist revival: Religious conversion of William Williams Pantycelyn after hearing Howel Harris preach in Talgarth churchyard.
  - The Whole Duty of a Woman "by a lady" includes a recipe for "a dripping pudding", the first record of Yorkshire pudding.

== Births ==
- 29 January – Thomas Paine, pamphleteer, revolutionary, radical, and intellectual (died 1809, New York)
- 19 April – John Small, cricketer (died 1826)
- 27 April – Edward Gibbon, historian (died 1794)
- 2 May – William Petty, 2nd Earl of Shelburne, Prime Minister (died 1805)
- 31 July – Princess Augusta of Great Britain, member of the Royal Family (died 1813)
- 11 August – Joseph Nollekens, sculptor (died 1823)
- 14 August – Charles Hutton, mathematician (died 1823)
- 1 October – Charles Towneley, antiquary (died 1805)
- date unknown
  - Frances Abington, actress (died 1815)
  - Richard Watson, bishop and academic (died 1816)

== Deaths ==
- 24 January – William Wake, Archbishop of Canterbury (born 1657)
- 29 January – George Hamilton, 1st Earl of Orkney, soldier (born 1666)
- 1 February – Hew Dalrymple, Lord North Berwick, Lord President of the Court of Session (born 1652)
- 14 February – Charles Talbot, 1st Baron Talbot of Hensol, Lord Chancellor (born 1685)
- 20 February – Elizabeth Rowe, poet and novelist (born 1674)
- 4 May – Eustace Budgell, writer (born 1686)
- 27 September – John Sidney, 6th Earl of Leicester, privy councillor (born 1680)
- 29 September – Joseph Adams, chief factor of the Hudson's Bay Company. (born 1700)
- 20 November – Caroline of Ansbach, queen of George II of Great Britain (born 1683, Ansbach)
- 11 December – John Strype, historian and biographer (born 1643)
- 27 December – William Bowyer, printer (born 1663)

== See also ==
- 1737 in Wales
