= 1673 in England =

- Centuries: 15th; 16th; 17th; 18th; 19th
- Decades: 1650s; 1660s; 1670s; 1680s; 1690s
- See also: Other events of 1673

Events from the year 1673 in England.

== Incumbents ==
- Monarch – Charles II

== Events ==
- 22 January – impostor Mary Carleton is hanged in Newgate Prison in London for multiple thefts and returning from penal transportation.
- 8 March – under pressure from Parliament, King Charles II withdraws the Royal Declaration of Indulgence.
- 29 March – the Test Act is passed, preventing Roman Catholics from holding public office.
- 28 May (7 June New Style) – Third Anglo-Dutch War: First Battle of Schooneveld – The Dutch Republic fleet commanded by Michiel de Ruyter defeats the allied Anglo-French fleet commanded by Prince Rupert of the Rhine.
- 4 June (14 June New Style) – Third Anglo-Dutch War: Second Battle of Schooneveld – The Dutch fleet again defeats the Anglo-French.
- 12 June – James, Duke of York, is forced to resign the office of Lord High Admiral because of the Test Act, making his Catholicism public.
- 19 June – Thomas Osborne becomes Lord High Treasurer.
- 3 July – Elkanah Settle's play The Empress of Morocco first publicly performed at the Dorset Garden Theatre in London by the Duke's Company and published with illustrations.
- 30 July (9 August New Style) – Third Anglo-Dutch War: a Dutch fleet retakes New York in the American colonies, renaming it New Orange.
- 11 August (21 August New Style) – Third Anglo-Dutch War: Battle of Texel (Kijkduin) – The Dutch fleet again defeats the Anglo-French, preventing England's Blackheath Army from landing in Zeeland.
- 9 November – the King removes Anthony Ashley Cooper, 1st Earl of Shaftesbury, from his position as Lord Chancellor.
- 14 November – architect Christopher Wren is knighted.
- 23 November – the widowed James, Duke of York, the King's brother and heir, marries Mary of Modena; they meet for the first time immediately before the ceremony in Dover.

=== Undated ===
- Chelsea Physic Garden established as the Apothecaries’ Garden in London.

== Births ==
- 6 January – James Brydges, 1st Duke of Chandos, Member of Parliament (died 1744)
- 3 February – Philip Stanhope, 3rd Earl of Chesterfield, (died 1726)
- 21 July – John Weaver, dancer and choreographer (died 1760)
- August – Henry FitzJames, illegitimate son of James II (died 1702)
- 11 August – Richard Mead, physician (died 1754)
- 16 October – Lady Mary Tudor, illegitimate daughter of Charles II, child actress (died 1726)
- Sir James Lowther, 4th Baronet, Member of Parliament (died 1755)
- John Oldmixon, historian (died 1742)
- James Stanhope, 1st Earl Stanhope, statesman and soldier (died 1721)

== Deaths ==
- 22 January – Mary Carleton, imposter (born 1642) (hanged)
- 27 April – Henry Herbert, Master of the Revels (born 1595)
- 20 May – Sir Edward Bagot, 2nd Baronet, Member of Parliament (born 1616)
- 12 July – Sir William Strickland, 1st Baronet, Member of Parliament (born c. 1596)
- 13 July – Sir Robert Long, 1st Baronet, politician (born c. 1600)
- 21 August – Henry Grey, 1st Earl of Stamford, soldier (born c. 1599)
- 10 October – Thomas Bradley, priest (born 1597)
- 17 October – Thomas Clifford, 1st Baron Clifford of Chudleigh, statesman (born 1630)
- 15 December – Margaret Cavendish, writer (born 1623)
- 31 December – Oliver St John, statesman and judge (born c. 1598)
- William Rainborowe, Leveller (year of birth unknown)
