= Owen Feltham =

English writer

Owen Feltham (1602 – 23 February 1668) was an English writer, author of a book entitled Resolves, Divine, Moral, and Political (c. 1620), containing 146 short essays. It had great popularity in its day. Feltham was for a time in the household of the Earl of Thomond as chaplain or secretary, and published Brief Character of the Low Countries (1652). His most cited essay is "How the Distempers of These Times Should Affect Wise Men", which John Gross included in The Oxford Book of Essays.

== Resolves, Divine, Moral and Political ==
Feltham was 21 years old when the first edition of Resolves was published in 1623. This collection of essays played a crucial role in the development of the English essay as a genre.

The original edition includes 100 “resolves”, “short, aphoristic commentaries on aspects of the three realms delineated by the title: divine, ethical, and political," which "concern in equal measure the private and public realms of middle-class English life”. Later revisions reflect how Feltham attempted to amalgamate these three distinct dimensions of “middle-class English life”, divine, ethical and political, into a cohesive whole. The revisions reflect “a more tolerant humanism”, perhaps best demonstrated in his handling of the "Woman Question", about which Feltham "asks commonsense questions and is willing to look beyond stereotypes”. In the 1628 edition, which includes the resolve “Of Woman”, Feltham asks: “Whence proceed the most abhorred villainies, but from a masculine unblushing impudence? When a woman grows bold and daring, we dislike her, and say, ‘she is too like a man’: yet in our selves, we magnify what we condemn. Is not this injustice?” In the 1661 edition the 85th resolve, "Of Marriage and Single Life", Feltham writes: "A wise wife comprehends both sexes: she is a woman for her body, and she is a man within: for her soul is like her Husbands. ... It is a Crown of blessings, when in one woman a man findeth both a wife and a friend."

== Sources ==
- BookRags
- The Broadview Anthology of British Literature, edited by Joseph Black et al., New York: Broadview Press, 2007.
