= 1679 in England =

- Centuries: 15th; 16th; 17th; 18th; 19th
- Decades: 1650s; 1660s; 1670s; 1680s; 1690s
- See also: Other events of 1679

The following events occurred in the Kingdom of England in the year 1679.

== Incumbents ==
- Monarch – Charles II

== Events ==
- 24 January – King Charles II dismisses the Cavalier Parliament after nearly 18 years in an attempt to avoid the impeachment of Lord Danby by the House of Commons.
- 6 March–27 May – Charles II's third parliament (the "Habeas Corpus Parliament" or "First Exclusion Parliament") meets and is led by the Privy Council Ministry.
- 15 May – Exclusion Crisis: The supporters of Anthony Ashley Cooper, 1st Earl of Shaftesbury, introduce an Exclusion Bill into the House of Commons with the aim of excluding the king's brother, the Catholic James, Duke of York, from the succession to the English throne.
- 27 May – Parliament passes the Habeas Corpus Act "for the better securing the liberty of the subject" and is then prorogued.
- 22 June – Battle of Bothwell Bridge in Scotland: Royal forces led by the Duke of Monmouth and John Graham of Claverhouse subdue the Scottish Covenanters.
- 12 July – Exclusion Crisis: the "Habeas Corpus Parliament" is dissolved while in recess by Royal prerogative to prevent it passing the Exclusion Bill.
- 24 July – Charles II's fourth parliament (the "Exclusion Bill Parliament") is summoned, but prorogued until 1680.
- September – Charles II forces the Duke of Monmouth, his illegitimate son, into exile in the Dutch Republic.
- 17 November – The Green Ribbon Club, a predecessor of the Whigs, organises a procession to burn an effigy of the Pope in London.
- 27 November – The Duke of Monmouth returns (without royal permission) from exile and is greeted in London by widespread celebration from those who consider him a potential Protestant heir to the throne.
- Undated – Bristol Baptist College, the world's first Baptist College, is founded by local merchant Edward Terrill.
- Approximate date – first bagnio opens in London.

== Births ==
- 18 March – Matthew Decker, merchant and writer (died 1749)
- 21 March – Benedict Calvert, 4th Baron Baltimore, politician (died 1715)
- 23 June – Sir Cholmeley Dering, 4th Baronet, politician (died 1711)
- 29 September – Thomas Chubb, Deist (died 1747)

== Deaths ==
- 3 January – George Monck, 1st Duke of Albemarle, soldier and politician (born 1608)
- 24 January – William Ireland, martyr (born 1636)
- 23 February – Anne Conway, Viscountess Conway, philosopher (born 1631)
- 27 February (bur.) – Joan Carlile, professional portrait painter (born c. 1606)
- 3 May – James Sharp, archbishop (assassinated) (born 1613)
- 2 June – Hannah Ayscough, mother of Isaac Newton (born 1623)
- 11 July – William Chamberlayne, poet (born 1619)
- 17 July – James Duport, scholar (born 1606)
- 19 July – John Plessington, martyr (born c. 1637)
- 6 August – John Snell, royalist (born 1629)
- 22 August
  - John Kemble, priest and martyr (born 1599)
  - John Wall, priest and martyr (born 1620)
- September – John Mayow, chemist and physiologist (born 1643)
- 2 September – Thomas Modyford, colonial governor (born c. 1620)
- 29 September – John Manners, 8th Earl of Rutland, Earl (born 1604)
- 12 October – William Gurnall, writer (born 1617)
- 26 October – Roger Boyle, 1st Earl of Orrery, soldier, statesman and dramatist (born 1621)
- 4 December – Thomas Hobbes, philosopher (born 1588)
- 26 December – Thomas Blount, lexicographer (born 1618)
- Late December – Praise-God Barebone, Fifth Monarchist (born c. 1598)
- William Goffe, parliamentarian and regicide, in New England (born c. 1605)
- John Hayls, portrait painter (born 1600)
