= 1666 in England =

- Centuries: 15th; 16th; 17th; 18th; 19th
- Decades: 1640s; 1650s; 1660s; 1670s; 1680s
- See also: Other events of 1666

1666 in England was the first year to be designated as an Annus mirabilis, in John Dryden's 1667 poem, which celebrated England's failure to be beaten either by fire (the Great Fire of London) or by the Dutch.

== Incumbents ==
- Monarch – Charles II

== Events ==
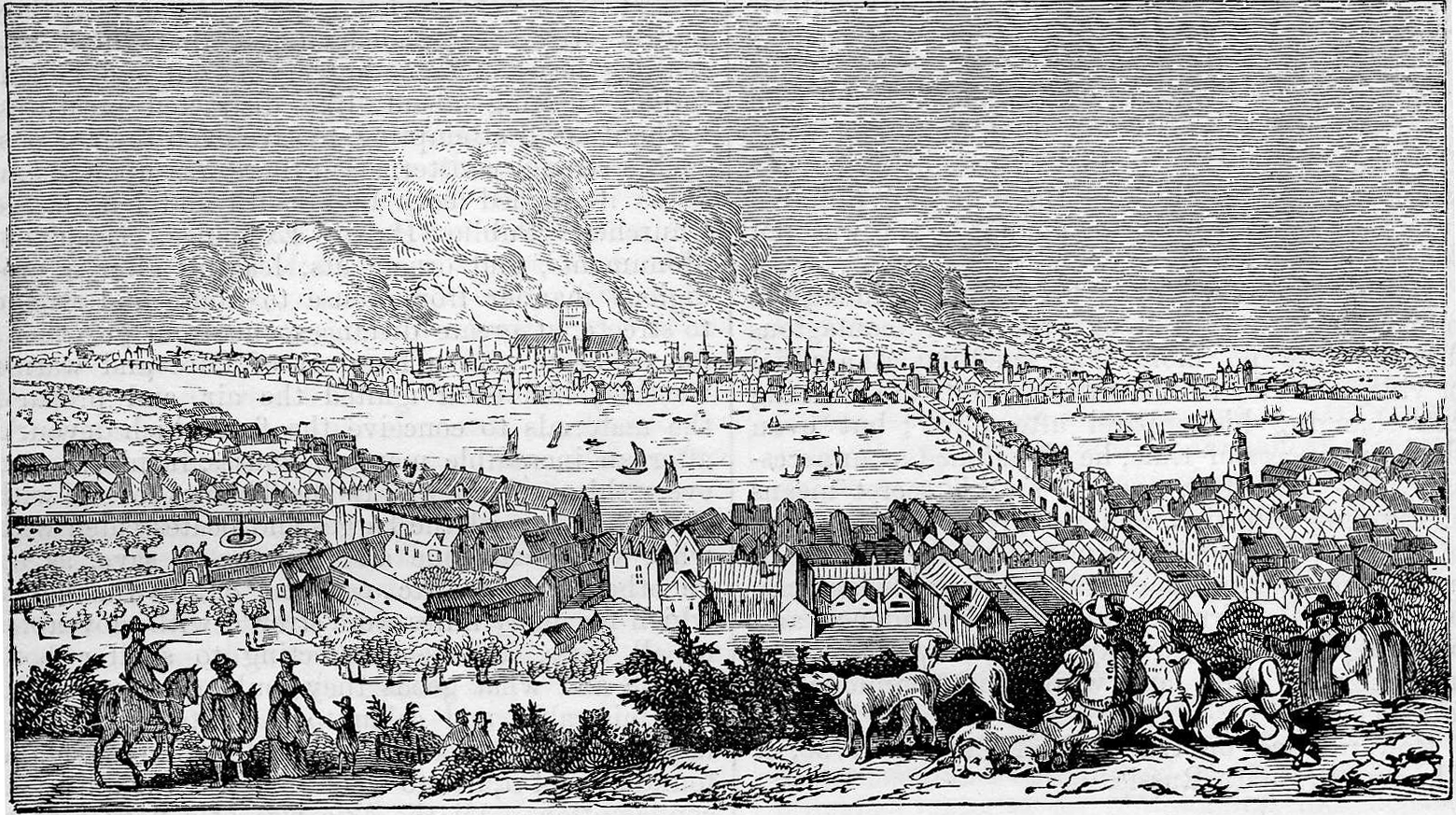
London, as it appeared from Bankside, Southwark, During the Great Fire — Derived from a Print of the Period by Visscher

- 1 February – royal court returns to London as the Great Plague of London subsides.
- 1–4 June (11–14 June New Style) – Second Anglo-Dutch War: Four Days' Battle – The Dutch Republic fleet under Michiel de Ruyter defeats the English in the North Sea in one of the longest naval engagements in history.
- 25 July (4 August New Style) – Second Anglo-Dutch War : St. James's Day Battle: The English fleet under Prince Rupert of the Rhine and George Monck, 1st Duke of Albemarle, defeats the Dutch off the North Foreland.
- 9–10 August (19–20 August New Style) – 'Holmes's Bonfire': Rear Admiral Robert Holmes leads an English raid on the Dutch island of Terschelling, destroying 150 merchant ships in the Vlie estuary, and pillaging the town of West-Terschelling.
- 2–5 September – Great Fire of London: A large fire breaks out in the City of London in the house of baker Thomas Farriner on Pudding Lane near London Bridge. The fire destroys more than 13,000 buildings including Old St Paul's Cathedral but only 6 people are known to have died.
- 6 September – Cestui que Vie Act passed by Parliament to provide for disposal of the property of missing persons.
- 10 October – a "day of humiliation and fasting" is held a month after the Great Fire of London.
- 23 October – the most intense tornado on record in English history, an F4 storm on the Fujita scale or T8 on the TORRO scale, strikes Lincolnshire with a path of destruction through the villages of Welbourn, Wellingore, Navenby and Boothby Graffoe, with winds of more than 213 miles per hour (343 km/h).
- 27 October – Robert Hubert, a Frenchman who had made a false confession to having started the Great Fire of London, is executed. A royal proclamation banishes Catholic priests.
- October – Philosopher John Locke meets his future patron, the statesman Anthony Ashley Cooper, in Oxford and forms an enduring and important friendship.

=== Undated ===
- Isaac Newton uses a prism to split sunlight (Deus phos) into the component colours of the optical spectrum, assisting understanding of the scientific nature of light. He also develops differential calculus. His discoveries this year lead to it being referred to as his Annus mirabilis or Newton's "Year of the Morning Star".
- First Burying in Woollen Act requires the dead, except plague victims and the destitute, to be buried in pure English woollen shrouds for the benefit of the home textile industry.

== Publications ==
- Margaret Cavendish, Duchess of Newcastle-upon-Tyne's Observations upon Experimental Philosophy and proto-science fiction The Blazing World.
- Thomas Hobbes' work De principiis et ratiocinatione geometr.

== Births ==
- 13 August – William Wotton, scholar (died 1727)
- 12 November – Mary Astell, feminist writer (died 1731)
- December – Stephen Gray, scientist (died 1736)
- Josiah Burchett, Secretary of the Admiralty (died 1746)
- John Harris, writer and encyclopaedist (died 1719)
- John Quelch, pirate (died 1704)

== Deaths ==
- 2 January – John Holles, 2nd Earl of Clare, noble (born 1595)
- 16 January – Dudley North, 3rd Baron North, nobleman (born 1581)
- 24 February – Nicholas Lanier, composer (born 1588)
- 4 June – Sir William Clarke, military administrator and politician (born c. 1623; died of wounds)
- c. 10 June – Christopher Myngs, admiral and pirate (born 1625; died of wounds)
- 16 June – Sir Richard Fanshawe, 1st Baronet, diplomat and translator (born 1608)
- 30 June – Alexander Brome, poet (born 1620)
- 10 July – John Fell, churchman (born 1625)
- 25 July – Montagu Bertie, 2nd Earl of Lindsey, noble (born 1608)
- 29 October
  - Edmund Calamy the Elder, Presbyterian leader (born 1600)
  - James Shirley, dramatist (born 1596)
- 3 November (bur.) – James Howell, writer (born 1594)
