= 1669 in England =

- Centuries: 15th; 16th; 17th; 18th; 19th
- Decades: 1640s; 1650s; 1660s; 1670s; 1680s
- See also: Other events of 1669

Events from the year 1669 in England.

== Incumbents ==
- Monarch – Charles II

== Events ==
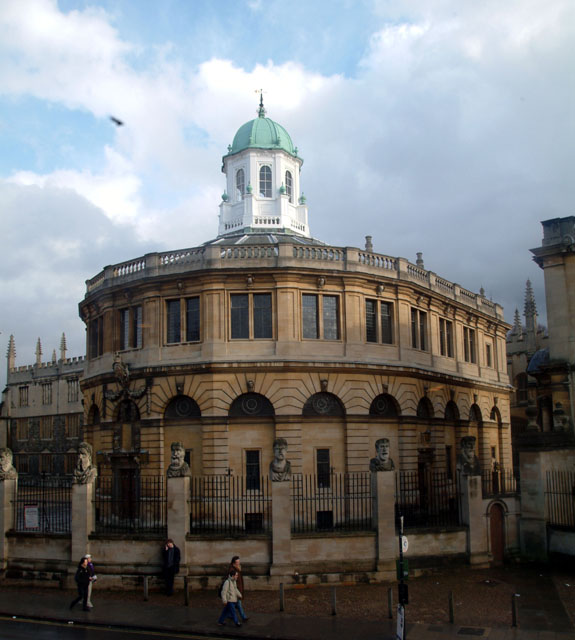
9 July – Christopher Wren's Sheldonian Theatre inaugurated for University of Oxford ceremonial.

- 23 February – Isaac Newton writes his first description of his new invention, the reflecting telescope.
- 19 March – Christopher Wren appointed Surveyor of the King's Works.
- 31 May – Samuel Pepys records the last entry in his diary, citing poor eyesight.
- June – Queen Catherine miscarries.
- 9 October – English ship Nonsuch returns to London with the first products acquired from trade around Canada's Hudson Bay, a cargo of fine furs; the bounty attracts investors for the soon-to-be-chartered Hudson's Bay Company.
- 29 October – Isaac Newton appointed Lucasian Professor of Mathematics at the University of Cambridge.
- 26 November – navigator John Narborough sets sail from Deptford to conduct a voyage of exploration in the South Seas.
- 18 December – the Battle of Cádiz begins off of the coast of the Spanish city as English warship HMS Mary Rose encounters seven pirate ships from Algeria. Although none of the ships on either side are sunk, the Algerines are forced to retreat with an unknown number of casualties, and the Mary Rose loses 12 dead and 18 wounded. See also Action of 28–29 December 1669.
- Undated – Count Cosimo, grand duke of Tuscany, visits the Tower of London and gives the Yeomen Warders the nickname "Beefeaters".

== Publications ==
- The cookbook The Closet of the Eminently Learned Sir Kenelme Digbie Kt. Opened.

== Births ==
- 20 January – Susanna Wesley, "mother of Methodism" (died 1742)
- 29 August – John Anstis, herald (died 1744)
- 11 November (date of baptism) – John Freame, banker (died 1745)
- 20 November (probable date of baptism) – Susanna Centlivre, English poet and actress (died 1723)
- Nicholas Blundell, recusant landed gentleman and diarist (died 1737)
- Edmund Gibson, Bishop of London and scholar (died 1748)
- Lady Lucy Herbert, canoness and devotional writer (died 1744)
- probable
  - Charles Howard, 3rd Earl of Carlisle, statesman (died 1738)
  - Peter King, 1st Baron King, Lord Chancellor (died 1734)

== Deaths ==
- 13 February – Peter Venables, politician (born 1604)
- 19 March – John Denham, Anglo-Irish Royalist, poet and Surveyor of the King's Works (born 1615)
- 25 March – Sir Lionel Tollemache, 3rd Baronet (born 1624)
- c. April – Nicasius le Febure, royal chemist, alchemist and apothecary (born 1615 in France)
- 1 May – Isaac Thornton, politician (born 1615)
- 10 or 11 July – Robert Stapylton, dramatist and courtier (born c.1607/09)
- 16 July – Thomas Howard, 1st Earl of Berkshire, politician (born 1587)
- 18 August – William Gawdy, politician (born 1612)
- 28 August – Sir William Drake, 1st Baronet, politician (born 1606)
- 10 September – Henrietta Maria of France, queen consort of Charles I of England (born 1609)
- 30 September – Henry King, poet and bishop (born 1592)
- 8 October – Jane Cavendish, poet and playwright (born 1621)
- 9 October – Richard Strode, politician (born 1584])
- 24 October – William Prynne, Puritan leader (born 1600)
- 10 November – Elisabeth Pepys, wife of Samuel (born 1640)
- 13 December – Thomas Dyke, politician (born 1619)
- 16 December – Nathaniel Fiennes, politician (born c. 1608)
- 24 December – Henry Foulis, theologian and controversialist (born 1638)
