= 1676 in England =

- Centuries: 15th; 16th; 17th; 18th; 19th
- Decades: 1650s; 1660s; 1670s; 1680s; 1690s
- See also: Other events of 1676

Events from the year 1676 in England.

== Incumbents ==
- Monarch – Charles II

== Events ==
- 18 February – Isaac Newton observes to Robert Hooke that "If I have seen further it is by standing on the shoulders of giants".
- 2 March – first performance of George Etherege's play The Man of Mode.
- 26 May – fire in Southwark destroys 625 houses.
- September to November – major influenza epidemic; the first to be recorded as such.
- 11 December – first performance of William Wycherley's play The Plain Dealer.

=== Undated ===
- Construction begins on Trinity College Library in Cambridge, designed by Sir Christopher Wren.
- The Royal Greenwich Observatory in London, designed by Wren, is completed this summer.
- Consecration of the first Greek Orthodox church in England, at Hog Lane, London.
- The first fossilised bone of what is now known to be a dinosaur is discovered by Robert Plot, the femur of a Megalosaurus from a limestone quarry at Cornwell near Chipping Norton.

== Births ==
- 4 January – Sir William Lowther, 1st Baronet, of Marske, Member of Parliament (died 1705)
- 19 January – John Weldon, composer (died 1736)
- baptised 30 January – Charles Fane, 1st Viscount Fane, courtier and landowner (died 1744)
- 14 June – Sir John Rogers, 2nd Baronet, lawyer and politician (died 1744)
- 21 June (Old Style) – Anthony Collins, philosopher (died 1729)
- 26 August – Robert Walpole, first Prime Minister of the United Kingdom (died 1745)
- 14 November – Benjamin Hoadly, clergy (died 1761)
- 29 November – Sir Henry Bunbury, 3rd Baronet, politician (died 1733)
- 30 December – John Philips, poet (died 1709)

== Deaths ==
- 4 March – Sir Edward Turnour, Speaker of the House of Commons (born 1617)
- 22 March – Lady Anne Clifford, literary patron (born 1590)
- 23 May (bur.) – William Samwell, architect (born 1628)
- 12 July – Henry Stubbe, writer and scholar (born 1632; drowned)
- 10 September – Gerrard Winstanley, religious reformer (born 1609)
- 11 October – Anthony Terill, theologian (born 1623)
- 25 December –
  - Matthew Hale, Lord Chief Justice (born 1609)
  - William Cavendish, 1st Duke of Newcastle, soldier, politician and writer (born 1592)
- Chesten Marchant, last monoglot speaker of the Cornish language
