= 1833 in the United Kingdom =

Events from the year 1833 in the United Kingdom.

== Incumbents ==
- Monarch – William IV
- Prime Minister – Charles Grey, 2nd Earl Grey (Whig)
- Foreign Secretary – Henry John Temple, 3rd Viscount Palmerston
- Home Secretary – William Lamb, 2nd Viscount Melbourne
- Secretary of War – Earl of Ripon (until 3 April) Edward Smith-Stanley (from 3 April)

== Events ==
- 3 January – Reassertion of British sovereignty over the Falkland Islands by British forces in the South Atlantic.
- 31 January – Francis Goldsmid is the first Jew to become an English barrister.
- 18 April – Over 300 delegates from England, Scotland, Wales and Ireland travel to the office of the Prime Minister to call for the immediate abolition of slavery throughout the British Empire.
- 25 May – Royal Horticultural Society holds the first flower show in Britain.
- 14 July – John Keble preaches a sermon on "National Apostasy" (in part a protest against the Church Temporalities (Ireland) Act 1833), launching the Oxford Movement within the Church of England.
- August – Parliament introducess annual grants for 50% of the cost of constructing new denominational elementary schools.
- 28 August
  - The Slavery Abolition Act receives Royal Assent, abolishing slavery in most of the British Empire, coming into effect 1 August 1834. A £20 million fund is established to compensate slaveowners.
  - Quakers and Moravians Act allows Quakers and Moravians to substitute an affirmation for a legal oath in accordance with their religious beliefs. As a result, Joseph Pease becomes the first Quaker to take his seat in Parliament.
  - Bank Notes Act gives Bank of England notes over £5 in value the status of "legal tender" in England and Wales.
- 29 August – The Factory Act makes it illegal to employ children less than 9 years old in factories and limits child workers of 9 to 13 years of age to a maximum of 9 hours a day.
- 31 August – Chartered ship Amphitrite sinks off Boulogne-sur-Mer while undertaking the penal transportation of 108 British female convicts and 12 children from Woolwich to New South Wales with the loss of 133 lives; only 3 crew survive.
- December – Edwin Chadwick introduces the Ten Hours Bill in Parliament.
- Undated – Laying out of Moor Park, Preston, by the local authority as a (partly) public park begins.

== Publications ==
- First of the Bridgewater Treatises, examining science in relation to God.
- Serialisation of Thomas Carlyle's Sartor Resartus in Fraser's Magazine.
- Charles Dickens' first published work of fiction, "A Dinner at Poplar Walk", first of what will become Sketches by Boz, appears unsigned in the Monthly Magazine (London, 1 December).
- Edward Bulwer's novel Godolphin.
- Mrs Favell Lee Mortimer's instructional text The Peep of Day, or, A series of the earliest religious instruction the infant mind is capable of receiving.
- Alfred Tennyson's collection Poems including "The Lady of Shalott".
- Publication of The Penny Cyclopædia of the Society for the Diffusion of Useful Knowledge edited by George Long begins.
- William Sandys' collection Christmas Carols Ancient and Modern.

== Births ==
- 23 January – Sir Lewis Morris, Anglo-Welsh poet (died 1907)
- 28 January – Charles George Gordon, British army officer and administrator (died 1885)
- 27 July – Thomas George Bonney, geologist (d. 1923)
- 12 August – Aylmer Cameron, VC recipient (d. 1909)
- 26 August – Henry Fawcett, statesman, economist and Postmaster General (d. 1884)
- 28 August – Sir Edward Burne-Jones, Anglo-Welsh artist (d. 1898)
- 4 November – James James, harpist and composer of the Welsh national anthem (d. 1902)
- 11 December – Francis E. Anstie, physician and medical researcher (d. 1874)

== Deaths ==
- 9 January – Sir Thomas Foley, admiral (b. 1757)
- 23 January – Edward Pellew, 1st Viscount Exmouth, admiral (b. 1757)
- 16 April – Henry Herbert, 2nd Earl of Carnarvon (b. 1772)
- 22 April – Richard Trevithick, Cornish-born inventor, mechanical engineer and builder of the first working railway steam locomotive (b. 1771)
- 15 May
  - Bewick Bridge, mathematician (b. 1767)
  - Edmund Kean, actor (b. 1787)
- 2 June – Simon Byrne, prizefighter (b. 1806)
- 10 July – George Agar-Ellis, 1st Baron Dover, politician and man of letters (b. 1797)
- 29 July – William Wilberforce, abolitionist (b. 1759)
- 27 September – Ram Mohan Roy, Bengali reformer (b. 1772)
- 11 November – James Grant, navigator (b. 1772)
- 3 December – Adam Buck, Irish-born neo-classical portraitist and miniature painter (b. 1759)
