= Henry Foulis =

Henry Foulis (1638–1669) was an English academic theologian and controversial author.

== Life ==
Foulis was the second son of Sir Henry Foulis, 2nd Baronet, of Ingleby, Yorkshire, and was grandson of Sir David Foulis. Born at Ingleby in 1638, he was educated by a presbyterian master at York. He became a commoner of Queen's College, Oxford, 6 June 1654, proceeded B.A. 3 February 1656, and M.A. on 25 June 1659; he was incorporated B.A. of Cambridge in 1658, and on 31 January 1660 was elected fellow of Lincoln College, Oxford. He studied divinity, took the degree of B.D. on 7 November 1667, and became sub-rector of his college.

His death took place on 24 December 1669, and he was buried in the chancel of St Michael's Church, Oxford.

== Works ==
On behalf of the Church of England he attacked both presbyterians and Catholics.

His works are:

- 'The History of the Wicked Plots and Conspiracies of our pretended Saints, the Presbyterians.' London, 1662; Oxford, 1674. This work, dedicated to his elder brother, Sir David (1633–1694), and his brother's wife, Catherine (d. 1717), was politically acceptable and was made available to readers in public places and some churches.
- 'The History of the Romish Treasons and Usurpations, with an Account of many gross Corruptions and Impostures of the Church of Rome,’ London, 1671, 1681.

Notes for other works were burnt by Foulis on his deathbed. An account drawn up by Foulis, of all the sermons preached before Parliament between 1640 and 1648 is among the Ashmolean MSS. in the Bodleian Library. Anthony Wood was an intimate friend, and made a catalogue of Foulis's library.
