= Sir John Bourke of Brittas =

Irish recusant who was hanged

Sir John Bourke of Brittas (c. 1550 – 20 December 1607), commonly called "Captain of Clanwilliam", was born about the middle of the 16th century. His father, Sir Richard Bourke, was brother of Sir William Bourke, 1st Baron of Castleconnell, and his mother was Honor, daughter of Conor O'Mulryan, Chief of Owney. Before marrying Bourke, Honor had been married to De Lacy of Bruff, and was the mother of that famous soldier of the Desmond Rebellions, Sir Piers de Lacy.

Sir John was married to Grace, the daughter of George Thornton, who received some of the confiscated Desmond property in County Limerick. He therefore, kept aloof during the Desmond Rebellions, but during Sir George Carew's victorious march through Limerick after he had taken the Castle of Lough Gur, he was called upon to submit to Queen Elizabeth. He replied stating he considered "it was sinful and damnable personally to submit to Her Majestie", and Sir George Carew thereupon laid waste his lands. On submission he was reproved for his "rebellious obstinacies", but through the good offices of Sir George Thornton, was pardoned and restored to his estate. He did not feel happy under the "protection" of the Queen and applied for leave to travel to Spain on a "pilgrimage to St. Iago", but this was refused him and he was compelled to remain with his family at Brittas.

== Religious persecution ==
When the religious persecutions which followed the suppression of the Fitzgeralds began, Bourke incurred the enmity of the government by his open avowal of the Catholic Faith and by his protection of the persecuted and hunted clergy. During the short lull in the persecutions he openly attended Divine Service at St. Mary's Cathedral, temporarily restored to the Catholics, and was received together with his family and retainers, into the Dominican Confraternity of the Holy Rosary.

On the renewal of the persecutions, Sir John was summoned to answer a charge of recusancy and was put into prison. Again the good offices of Sir George Thornton obtained his release, but although restored to his estates and fortune, he continued to harbour the hunted priests and was acknowledged "protector of the Catholics".

== Arrest ==
In October 1607, while Mass was being celebrated in Brittas Castle, he was betrayed by his kinsmen, Theobald Bourke of Castleconnell and Sir Edmond Walsh of Abington. A detachment of horse soldiers arrived to arrest the priests and on Sir John's refusing to give them up or open the castle to the soldiers he was outlawed and Brittas Castle besieged. Sir John "with his casque on his head, his shield on his left arm and his sword in his right hand, burst out and made good his escape". He arrived at Waterford on his way to Spain, but was here betrayed, arrested and sent back to Limerick for trial.

He refused to renounce the Catholic Faith or to conform to the new state religion, stating "he could acknowledge no king or queen against the King of Heaven and Queen of Heaven...whoever would act otherwise was not a servant of God but a slave of the devil", and was sentenced to be hanged, beheaded, and quartered.

== Execution ==
He was hung on Gallows Green, 20 December 1607, but owing to his influence and popularity the latter part of the sentence was remitted. His body was returned to his relatives and buried in St. John's Churchyard, where no trace of it now remains.

== Legacy ==
Sir John left nine children behind him, but his estates were confiscated and granted to Theobald Bourke, his betrayer, who was created 1st Baron of Brittas in 1618. The statue of "Our Lady of Limerick" given in reparation by a descendant of the Sharsfield who condemned Bourke to death. He is the grandfather of John Bourke, Mayor of Limerick, who was the great-grandfather of Edmund Burke.
