= 1667 in England =

- Centuries: 15th; 16th; 17th; 18th; 19th
- Decades: 1640s; 1650s; 1660s; 1670s; 1680s
- See also: Other events of 1667

Events from the year 1667 in England. Dates are given in Old Style. As of the start of this year, the Gregorian calendar in use by the Dutch Republic and elsewhere on the continent is 10 days ahead of the Julian calendar in use in England.

== Incumbents ==
- Monarch – Charles II

== Events ==
- 5 February – In the Second Anglo-Dutch War, warship HMS Saint Patrick is captured less than nine months after being launched, when it fights an action off the North Foreland. Captain Robert Saunders and 8 of his crew are killed while fighting Dutch ships Delft and Shakerlo. The Dutch Navy renames the ship Zwanenburg.
- 8 February – The first part of the Rebuilding of London Act 1666, following last year's Great Fire of London, goes into effect as royal assent is given to the Fire of London Disputes Act 1666, which establishes the Fire Court. The Court, sitting at Clifford's Inn near Fleet Street, hears cases starting on February 27 and continuing until the end of 1668.
- February – Charles II secretly signs a treaty with France, formally agreed in April.
- c. February – Elkanah Settle's play Cambyses, King of Persia first performed.
- 6–7 March – Exceptionally cold spell.
- 25 February – During the Second Anglo-Dutch War, a Dutch Navy force commanded by Admiral Abraham Crijnssen arrives at the English South American colony of Surinam and sails up the Suriname River to Fort Willoughby (Paramaribo). Bombardment of the fort begins the next day, and its commander, William Byam surrenders, effectively giving control of Surinam to the Dutch Republic.
- 27 April – John Milton seals a contract for publication of Paradise Lost with London printer Samuel Simmons for an initial payment of £5. The first edition is published in October and sells out in eighteen months.
- 10 May – A second Conventicle Act, preventing groups of more than five non-followers of the Church of England from assembling, comes into effect with increased incentives for the authorities to prosecute.
- 9–14 June – Raid on the Medway: a Dutch fleet under admiral Michiel de Ruyter lands on Canvey Island to seize supplies, takes Sheerness fort, sails up the River Medway, raids Chatham Dockyard and escapes with the royal barge The Royal Charles.
- 27 June
  - An attempt by Dutch ships to enter the River Thames above Gravesend is called off.
  - George Villiers, Duke of Buckingham, one of the five members of the Cabal ministry (Lords Chudleigh, Arlington, Buckingham, Ashley and Lauderdale), turns himself in after a warrant for his arrest is issued on 25 February on charges of treason (including the casting of the King's horoscope). He is held in the Tower of London for four years before being released on 17 July 1671.
- 2 July – A Dutch marine force lands near Woodbridge, Suffolk, and prevents Landguard Fort from being reinforced but a direct assault on the fort is beaten off by the garrison, The Duke of York and Albany's Maritime Regiment of Foot, predecessor of the Royal Marines, and hence the first land action fought by marines.
- 3 July – A Dutch attack on Osleybay fails.
- c. 13–17 July – Exceptionally warm spell peaks.
- 21 July (Old Style – 31 July New Style) – The Second Anglo-Dutch War is ended by the Treaty of Breda, negotiation of which began on 14 May and coming into effect in August. In the Americas, the Dutch retain control of Surinam, the English retain New Netherland and the French Acadia.
- 30 August – The Earl of Clarendon is dismissed as Lord Chancellor.
- 30 November–1 December – The Earl of Clarendon goes into exile on the continent.

=== Undated ===
- Robert Hooke demonstrates that the alteration of the blood in the lungs is essential for respiration.

== Publications ==
- Margaret Cavendish's biography The life of the thrice noble, high and puissant prince William Cavendishe, Duke, Marquess, and Earl of Newcastle
- John Dryden's poem Annus Mirabilis.
- Richard Head's apocryphal The life and death of Mother Shipton
- John Milton's epic poem Paradise Lost.

== Births ==
- 12 January – Jonathan Richardson, portrait painter, writer on art and collector (died 1745)
- 29 April – John Arbuthnot, physician and writer (died 1735)
- 9 December – William Whiston, mathematician (died 1752)
- John Pomfret, poet and clergyman (died 1702)
- John Richardson, Quaker preacher and autobiographer (died 1753)
- Ned Ward, satirical writer and publican (died 1731)
- Probable year – Susanna Centlivre, née Freeman, poet, actress and playwright (died 1723)

== Deaths ==
- 2 May – George Wither, writer (born 1588)
- 16 May – Thomas Wriothesley, 4th Earl of Southampton, statesman (born 1607)
- 20 June – James Stuart, Duke of Cambridge, son of James, Duke of York and 2nd heir to the throne (smallpox or plague) (born 1663)
- 28 July – Abraham Cowley, poet (born 1618)
