= 1682 in England =

- Centuries: 15th; 16th; 17th; 18th; 19th
- Decades: 1660s; 1670s; 1680s; 1690s; 1700s
- See also: Other events of 1682

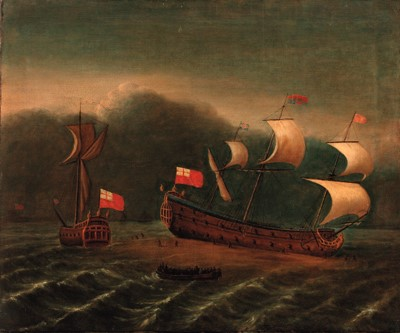
Painting depicting H.M.S. Gloucester aground on the Lemon and Ower Sandbank on 6 May 1682, carrying James, Duke of York.

Events from the year 1682 in England.

== Incumbents ==
- Monarch – Charles II

== Events ==
- 11 March – work begins on construction of the Royal Hospital Chelsea for old soldiers in London.
- 6 May – while on passage from Portsmouth to Scotland, HMS Gloucester runs aground on a sandbank off the Norfolk coast and sinks. The Duke of York (the future King James II) and John Churchill (the future 1st Duke of Marlborough) are among those saved but at least 120 drown.
- 25 August – following the Bideford witch trial, three women become (probably) the penultimate known to be hanged for witchcraft in England, at Exeter.
- September – Halley's Comet makes an appearance, and is observed by Edmond Halley himself.
- 20 September – The Duke of Monmouth is arrested in Stafford for riotous behaviour.
- 19 November – fire at Wapping makes 1,500 homeless.
- 20 November – Anthony Ashley-Cooper, 1st Earl of Shaftesbury, flees to Holland after being accused of planning a coup against King Charles II.
- Celia Fiennes, noblewoman and traveller, begins her journeys across Britain in a venture that will prove to be her life's work. Her aim is to chronicle the towns, cities and great houses of the country. Her travels continue until at least 1712, and will take her to every county in England, though the main body of her journal is not written until 1702.

== Births ==
- 16 April – John Hadley, inventor (died 1744)
- 10 July – Roger Cotes, mathematician (died 1716)

== Deaths ==
- 12 February – Thomas Thynne, landowner and politician (born 1647/1648)
- 19 October – Sir Thomas Browne author, physician and philosopher (born 1605)
- 19 November – Prince Rupert of the Rhine, Royalist commander in the English Civil War (born 1619)
