= 1677 in England =

- Centuries: 15th; 16th; 17th; 18th; 19th
- Decades: 1650s; 1660s; 1670s; 1680s; 1690s
- See also: Other events of 1677

The following events occurred in the Kingdom of England in the year 1677.

== Incumbents ==
- Monarch – Charles II

== Events ==
- 16 February – politicians the Earl of Shaftesbury, Duke of Buckingham, Lord Wharton and the Earl of Salisbury are arrested and sent to the Tower of London for challenging the legitimacy of the new session of Parliament.
- February – Nathaniel Lee's blank verse tragedy The Rival Queens, or the Death of Alexander the Great, is performed at the Theatre Royal, Drury Lane, with Mrs Charlotte Melmoth as Roxana.
- 16 April – Royal assent given to:
  - Ecclesiastical Jurisdiction Act, placing the power to judge heresy and similar offences with the ecclesiastical courts, whose power of punishment is limited to excommunication, thus abolishing capital punishment (burning at the stake) in such cases.
  - Statute of Frauds, requiring certain types of contract to be in writing.
- 10 September – Henry Purcell is appointed a musician to the royal court.
- 4 November – William of Orange marries Princess Mary of York at St James's Palace.
- 30 December – William Sancroft nominated by the King as Archbishop of Canterbury.

=== Undated ===
- The Baptist Confession of Faith is first published in London.
- The Monument to the Great Fire of London, designed by Christopher Wren and Robert Hooke is completed.
- Chapel of Emmanuel College, Cambridge, designed by Wren.
- Elias Ashmole gifts the collection that begins the Ashmolean Museum to the University of Oxford.
- The John Roan School is established in Greenwich, London.
- Robert Plot publishes The Natural History of Oxford-shire, being an essay toward the natural history of England, in which he describes the fossilised femur of a human giant, now known to be from the dinosaur Megalosaurus.
- Fabian Stedman publishes Tintinnalogia, or, the Art of Ringing.

== Births ==
- 17 September – Stephen Hales, physiologist, chemist and inventor (died 1761)
- 17 November – Sir Francis Boynton, Member of Parliament (died 1739)
- Whitmore Acton, Member of Parliament (died 1732)
- Elizabeth Wardlaw, writer (died 1727)

== Deaths ==
- 4 May – Isaac Barrow, mathematician (born 1630)
- 20 May – George Digby, 2nd Earl of Bristol, statesman (born 1612)
- August – Matthew Locke, composer (born 1621)
- 27 August – Richard Sackville, 5th Earl of Dorset, Earl (born 1622)
- 11 September – James Harrington, political philosopher (born 1611)
- 14 October – Francis Glisson, physician, anatomist and writer (born 1597)
- 2 November – Robert Sidney, 2nd Earl of Leicester, Earl (born 1595)
- Ralph Bankes, Member of Parliament (born 1631)
- Thomas Manton, theologian (born 1620)
- Gilbert Sheldon, Archbishop of Canterbury (born 1598)
