= 1670 in England =

- Centuries: 15th; 16th; 17th; 18th; 19th
- Decades: 1650s; 1660s; 1670s; 1680s; 1690s
- See also: Other events of 1670

Events from the year 1670 in England.

== Incumbents ==
- Monarch – Charles II

== Events ==
- 21 January – French-born 'gentleman highwayman' Claude Duval is hanged at Tyburn gallows in London and subsequently buried in St Paul's, Covent Garden.
- 24 March – John Manners, Lord Roos, obtains a private act of Parliament, Lord Roos Divorce Act 1670 (22 Cha. 2. c. 1 Pr.), giving him a divorce from his wife, Anne Manners, Lady Roos, on the grounds of her adultery.
- 31 March – warship HMS Sapphire is wrecked beyond repair when her captain, John Pearce, orders the ship to be run aground at Sicily while fleeing what he believes to be four Algerian pirate ships, rather than attempting to fight. The ships turn out to have been friendly, and Pearce and his lieutenant, Andrew Logan, are court-martialed for their cowardice and executed on 17 September.
- 11 April – Conventicles Act 1670 receives royal assent, imposing fines for attendance at "seditious conventicles" (any religious assembly other than of the Church of England).
- 2 May – a royal charter is granted to the Hudson's Bay Company with the jurisdiction to control administration and commerce in Rupert's Land, governed for the crown by Rupert, Duke of Cumberland, the King's cousin, a 1.5 million square mile area around Hudson Bay in North America.
- 1 June – the secret Treaty of Dover is signed between King Charles II of England and Louis XIV of France, ending hostilities between their kingdoms. Louis will give Charles 200,000 pounds annually. In return Charles promises to relax the laws against Catholics, gradually re-Catholicize England, support French policy against the Dutch Republic (leading England into the Third Anglo-Dutch War), and convert to Catholicism himself when conditions permit. The treaty is ratified on 4 June. The terms will not become public until the early 19th century. Louis is represented in the negotiations by Charles' sister, Princess Henrietta, Duchess of Orléans, who dies suddenly on 30 June soon after returning to France.
- 8 July O.S. – by the Treaty of Madrid (Godolphin treaty), Spain recognises Jamaica and the Cayman Islands as English possessions.
- 11 July – the Treaty of Copenhagen is signed between Charles II and King Christian V of Denmark to promote alliance and commerce.
- 14 August – Quakers William Penn and William Mead preach in Gracechurch Street in the City of London, in defiance of the new Conventicles Act, and are arrested and tried but on 5 September the jury refuses to convict.
- 17 August – a joint fleet of warships from England (commanded by Commodore Richard Beach on HMS Hampshire) and from the Dutch Republic (led by Admiral Willem Joseph van Ghent on Spiegel) rescue 250 Christian slaves and then sink six Barbary pirate ships in a battle in the Mediterranean Sea off of the coast of Morocco at Cape Spartel.
- 18 August – John Dryden is appointed as historiographer royal.
- 20 September – production of Mrs Aphra Behn's first play, The Forced Marriage, at the Lincoln's Inn Fields Theatre by the Duke's Company, with Thomas Betterton in the lead.
- 9 November – Bushel's Case, following the trial of Penn, establishes that members of a jury may not be punished for delivering a verdict according to their conscience even if contrary to the view of the judge.
- 21 December
  - The Cabal Ministry in London signs a treaty with France based on June's secret Treaty of Dover but with the conversion clause removed.
  - John Coventry, MP is maimed for making a joke about the King, resulting in passing of the Maiming Act, making lying in wait to maim anyone a felony.
- Rock salt is discovered near Northwich in Cheshire.

== Births ==
- 24 January – William Congreve, playwright (died 1729)
- 10 April – Edward Montagu, 3rd Earl of Sandwich (died 1729)
- 23 April – Cassandra Willoughby, Duchess of Chandos, historian (died 1735)
- 8 May – Charles Beauclerk, 1st Duke of St Albans, soldier, illegitimate son of King Charles II and Nell Gwyn (died 1726)
- 19 July – Richard Leveridge, bass singer and composer (died 1758)
- 21 August – James FitzJames, 1st Duke of Berwick, soldier, illegitimate son of James, Duke of York and Arabella Churchill, in France (died 1734)
- 27 September – Sir Thomas Stanley, 4th Baronet, Member of Parliament (died 1714)
- 4 December – John Aislabie, politician and director of the South Sea Company (died 1742)
- 28 December – Algernon Capell, 2nd Earl of Essex (died 1710)
- Approximate date
  - Laurence Echard, historian (died 1730)
  - Abigail Masham, Baroness Masham, royal favourite (died 1734)

== Deaths ==
- 3 January – George Monck, 1st Duke of Albemarle, soldier (born 1608)
- 21 January – Claude Duval, highwayman, hanged (born 1643, France)
- 15 March – John Davenport, clergy (born 1597)
- 5 May – Sir Geoffrey Palmer, 1st Baronet, lawyer and politician (born 1598)
- 30 June – Princess Henrietta Anne Stuart (born 1644)
- 4 July – Christopher Hatton, 1st Baron Hatton, Royalist (born 1605)
- 16 September – William Penn, admiral (born 1621)
- 21 November – Sir Walter Yonge, 2nd Baronet, Member of Parliament (born c. 1625)
- Gilbert Mabbot, licenser of the press (born 1622)
