= 1684 in England =

- Centuries: 15th; 16th; 17th; 18th; 19th
- Decades: 1660s; 1670s; 1680s; 1690s; 1700s
- See also: Other events of 1684

Events from the year 1684 in England.

== Incumbents ==
- Monarch – Charles II

== Events ==
- January–March – England has its coldest winter in living memory; the River Thames and the sea as far as 2 miles out from land freezes over. The Chipperfield's Circus dynasty begins when James Chipperfield introduces performing animals to England at the Frost Fair on the Thames in London.
- 5 January – Charles II gives the title Duke of St Albans to Charles Beauclerk, his illegitimate son by Nell Gwyn.
- 15 March – highwayman John Nevison hanged in York for murder.
- 10 May – Titus Oates arrested for perjury.
- 31 July – the village of Churchill, Oxfordshire, is largely destroyed by fire.
- 10 December – Isaac Newton's derivation of Kepler's laws from his theory of gravity, contained in the paper De motu corporum in gyrum, is read to the Royal Society by Edmund Halley.

=== Undated ===
- The East India Company receives Chinese permission to build a trading station at Canton.
- Robert Hooke invents the semaphore line.
- John Bunyan writes the second part of The Pilgrim's Progress

== Births ==
- 4 January
  - Henry Coote, 5th Earl of Mountrath, politician (died 1720)
  - Henry Grove, nonconformist minister (died 1738)
- 19 February – George Duckett, Member of Parliament (died 1732)
- 21 March – Oley Douglas, Member of Parliament (died 1719)
- 22 March – William Pulteney, 1st Earl of Bath, noble (died 1764)
- 2 April – Henry Somerset, 2nd Duke of Beaufort, noble (died 1714)
- 6 June – Nathaniel Lardner, theologian (died 1768)
- 24 August – Sir Robert Munro, 6th Baronet, politician (died 1746)
- 17 September – Henry Cantrell, Anglican clergyman, writer (died 1773)
- 2 October – Thomas Seaton, religious writer (died 1741)
- 16 October – Peter Walkden, Presbyterian minister and diarist (died 1769)
- 11 November – Algernon Seymour, 7th Duke of Somerset, noble (died 1750)
- 12 November – Edward Vernon, admiral (died 1757)
- 16 November – Allen Bathurst, 1st Earl Bathurst, politician (died 1775)
- 15 December – James Jurin, scientist and physician (died 1750)
- 16 December – Samuel Clark of St Albans, theologian (died 1750)
- 31 December – William Grimston, 1st Viscount Grimston, landowner and Member of Parliament (died 1756)

== Deaths ==
- 13 January – Henry Howard, 6th Duke of Norfolk, noble (born 1628)
- 5 February – Dorothy Spencer, Countess of Sunderland (born 1617)
- 11 February – Sir Thomas Peyton, 2nd Baronet, politician (born 1613)
- 24 March – Elizabeth Ridgeway, poisoner (burned at the stake)
- 28 March (bur.) – John Lambert, Parliamentarian general (born 1619)
- 1 April – Roger Williams, theologian and colonist (born 1603)
- 5 April – Lord William Brouncker, mathematician (born 1602)
- 30 April – James Holloway, merchant and conspirator (hanged)
- 4 May – John Nevison, highwayman (born 1639; hanged)
- 10 May – Anne Carr, Countess of Bedford, noble (born 1615)
- 20 June – Sir Thomas Armstrong, politician (born c. 1633; hanged)
- 6 July – Peter Gunning, royalist churchman (born 1614)
- 28 July – Charlotte Paston, Countess of Yarmouth, noblewoman, illegitimate daughter of Charles II (born c. 1650)
- 8 August – George Booth, 1st Baron Delamer (born 1622)
- October – Dud Dudley, ironmaster (born 1600?)
- 12 October – William Croone, physician, an original Fellow of the Royal Society (born 1633)
- 23 November – William Cavendish, 3rd Earl of Devonshire, noble (born 1617)
- 10 December – Sir Thomas Sclater, 1st Baronet, politician (born 1615)
- 22 December – Francis Hawley, 1st Baron Hawley, politician (born 1608)
