= 1672 in England =

- Centuries: 15th; 16th; 17th; 18th; 19th
- Decades: 1650s; 1660s; 1670s; 1680s; 1690s
- See also: Other events of 1672

Events from the year 1672 in England.

== Incumbents ==
- Monarch – Charles II

== Events ==
The Burning of the Royal James at the Battle of Solebay, by Willem van de Velde

- 2 January – cash payments by the Exchequer suspended for a year, due to fears of imminent bankruptcy.
- 11 January – Isaac Newton is elected a Fellow of the Royal Society of London and it then demonstrates his reflecting telescope to the King.
- 25 January – the Theatre Royal in Bridges Street in London burns down, forcing the King's Company to relocate to the Lincoln's Inn Fields Theatre while the Theatre Royal is rebuilt in Drury Lane.
- 6 February – Isaac Newton sends for publication a paper regarding his experiments on the refraction of light through glass prisms and makes the first identification of the primary colours.
- 25 February – Willem, Prince of Orange, the 21-year-old Stadtholder of Gelderland and Utrecht and future King William III of England, is approved by the States General of the Dutch Republic to command the Dutch States Army for the impending war with England. On 4 July he is appointed Stadtholder of Holland and Zeeland.
- 12 March – Action of 12 March 1672: A 2-day naval engagement between an English coastal patrol and a Dutch convoy off Beachy Head. The English fleet suffers severe damage while most of the Dutch convoy escapes, although one of the Dutch commanders (De Haaze) is killed and one warship taken as a prize (Klein Hollandia) sinks; the latter will be rediscovered in 2019.
- 15 March – King Charles II issues the Royal Declaration of Indulgence, suspending execution of Penal Laws against Protestant nonconformists and Roman Catholics in his realms.
- 17 March – Third Anglo-Dutch War: England declares war on the Dutch Republic.
- 28 May (7 June New Style) – the first naval battle of the Third Anglo-Dutch War is fought at the Battle of Solebay off Southwold; indecisive.
- August – farthing and halfpenny coins, machine pressed at the Royal Mint, are introduced by royal decree, the first official issue of copper coinage. The reverse portrays Britannia, thought to have been modelled by Frances Stewart, Duchess of Richmond.
- 13 September – John Bunyan released after a 12-year imprisonment for preaching without a licence.
- 16 September – the Board of Trade is created by a merger of the Council of Trade and the Council of Foreign Plantations and the Earl of Shaftesbury is appointed as the first Lord of Trade.
- 28 November – after more than five years of administration of the Treasury by a five-member commission, Lord Clifford of Chudleigh, one of the members, becomes the Lord High Treasurer of England.
- December – John Dryden's play Marriage à la Mode first performed in London by the King's Company.
- 18 December – an English invasion force captures the Caribbean island of Tobago from Dutch colonists and destroys the settlement.
- 30 December – first commercial public concert series in Europe begins; organised by John Banister at Whitefriars, near Fleet Street in London.

=== Undated ===
- The bankrupt Company of Royal Adventurers Trading to Africa is restructured into the new Royal African Company with a new, broader charter to trade into West Africa.
- Rebuilding begins of St Stephen Walbrook church in the City of London, designed by Christopher Wren.
- Rebuilding of Temple Bar, London, designed by Christopher Wren.
- Richard Hoare becomes a partner in the London goldsmith's business which, as private banking house C. Hoare & Co., will survive through to the 21st century.
- The Fulham Pottery is established in London by John Dwight, the earliest certainly known native stoneware manufacturer in England; it will survive until the second half of the 20th century.

== Births ==
- 9 April – Thomas Willoughby, 1st Baron Middleton, Member of Parliament (died 1729)
- 1 May – Joseph Addison, politician and writer (died 1719)
- June – Henry Hyde, 4th Earl of Clarendon, politician (died 1753)
- 17 July (baptism) – Anthony Blackwall, scholar (died 1730)
- 29 July – Charles Lennox, 1st Duke of Richmond, illegitimate son of Charles II (died 1723)
- 17 September (baptism) – Thomas Wentworth, 1st Earl of Strafford, diplomat and First Lord of the Admiralty (died 1739)
- John Lovelace, 4th Baron Lovelace, colonial governor (died 1709)
- Thomas Steers, civil engineer (died 1750)

== Deaths ==
- 15 January – John Cosin, clergyman (born 1594)
- 25 January – Richard Bell, killed in fire at Drury Lane Theatre
- 5 May – Samuel Cooper, painter (born 1609)
- 11 May – Charles Seton, 2nd Earl of Dunfermline, royalist (born 1615)
- 28 May
  - Edward Montagu, 1st Earl of Sandwich, admiral (born 1625)
  - John Trevor, politician (born |1626)
- 27 June – Roger Twysden, antiquarian and royalist (born 1597)
- 3 July – Francis Willughby, biologist (born 1635)
- 8 August – Sir John Borlase, 1st Baronet, politician (born 1619)
- 24 October – John Webb, architect (born 1611)
- 15 November – Sir Walter Long, 1st Baronet of Whaddon, Member of Parliament (born c. 1603)
- 19 November
  - Peter Sterry, theologian (born 1613)
  - John Wilkins, Bishop of Chester (born 1614)
- 6 December – Jasper Mayne, dramatist (born 1604)
- 21 December – Charles Stanley, 8th Earl of Derby, (born 1628)
- Philip Nye, theologian (born c. 1595)
