= 1680 in England =

- Centuries: 15th; 16th; 17th; 18th; 19th
- Decades: 1660s; 1670s; 1680s; 1690s; 1700s
- See also: Other events of 1680

Events from the year 1680 in England.

== Incumbents ==
- Monarch – Charles II

== Events ==
- 24 January – William Harris, one of the four English Puritans who established the Plymouth Colony and then the Providence Plantations at Rhode Island in 1636, is captured by Algerian pirates when his ship is boarded while he is making a voyage back to England. After being sold into slavery on 23 February, he remains a slave until ransom is paid. He dies in 1681, three days after his return to England.
- February – Rev. Ralph Davenant's will provides for foundation of the Davenant Foundation School for poor boys in Whitechapel.
- 24 March – The Earl of Shaftesbury informs the Privy Council of England that the Roman Catholics of Ireland are about to launch a rebellion, backed by France. The investigation falsely leads to the arrest and ultimate execution of the Roman Catholic Archbishop of Armagh, Oliver Plunkett.
- 27 March – The London Penny Post delivery service begins operations after being created by Robert Murray and William Dockwra, with a policy of delivering letters to any part of London or its suburbs for the price of one penny.
- 10 June – England and Spain sign a mutual defence treaty.
- 11 June – Elizabeth Cellier, a Catholic midwife, is tried and acquitted of treason for pamphleting against the government.
- 21 October – Charles II's fourth parliament (the "Exclusion Bill Parliament", summoned in 1679) assembles. The term Whig comes to be used for those in favour of the Exclusion Bill and Tory for those who oppose it.
- 4 November – a second Exclusion Bill is proposed to exclude the Catholic James, Duke of York from inheriting the throne.
- 15 November – the Exclusion Bill is defeated in the House of Lords.
- 17 November – the Green Ribbon Club, a predecessor of the Whigs, organises a procession to burn an effigy of the Pope in London for the second year running.
- 7 December – William Howard, 1st Viscount Stafford, is condemned to death by perjured evidence in the House of Lords for conspiracy in the supposed "Popish Plot".
- Undated
  - First fire insurance office established, the Phoenix.
  - Trinity House erects a lighthouse on St Agnes, Isles of Scilly.

== Births ==
- 23 January – Joseph Ames, author (died 1759)
- 14 February – John Sidney, 6th Earl of Leicester, privy councillor (died 1737)
- 20 June – Sir John Aubrey, 3rd Baronet, politician (died 1743)
- 12 October – Arthur Collier, philosopher (died 1732)
- Blackbeard, pirate (died 1718)
- John Colson, mathematician (died 1760)
- Barnabas Gunn, organist and composer (died 1753)
- John Machin, mathematician (died 1752)
- Sarah Derith, politically active salon hostess (died 1745)

== Deaths ==
- 2 January – John Jolliffe, politician and businessman (born 1613)
- 14 January (New Style) – George Carteret, statesman (born c. 1610)
- 18 January – John Hervey, courtier and politician (born 1616)
- 20 January – Ann, Lady Fanshawe, memoirist (born 1625)
- 23 January – Capel Luckyn, Member of Parliament (born 1622)
- February – Ralph Davenant, rector, founder of Davenant Foundation School
- 17 February – Denzil Holles, 1st Baron Holles, statesman and writer (born 1599)
- 16 May – Sir William Blackett, 1st Baronet, of Matfen, Member of Parliament (born 1620)
- 22 May – Richard Sawkins, pirate (year of birth unknown)
- 18 June – Samuel Butler, satirical poet (born 1612)
- 26 July
  - Sir Hugh Smith, 1st Baronet, Member of Parliament (born 1632)
  - John Wilmot, 2nd Earl of Rochester, poet (born 1647)
- 20 August – William Bedloe, informer (born 1650)
- 24 August – Thomas Blood, thief of the English Crown Jewels (born 1618)
- 9 September – Henry Marten, regicide (born 1602)
- 11 September – Roger Crab, Puritan political writer (born 1621)
- 17 October – Charles FitzCharles, 1st Earl of Plymouth, illegitimate son of Charles II, died at siege of Tangier (born 1657)
- 9 November – Hungerford Dunch, politician (born 1639)
- 30 November – Peter Lely, painter (born 1618)
- 8 December – Henry Pierrepont, 1st Marquess of Dorchester, politician (born 1606)
- 29 December – William Howard, 1st Viscount Stafford, martyr (born 1614)
- December – Elizabeth Killigrew, Viscountess Shannon, courtier and royal mistress (born 1622)
- Cornelius Essex, pirate (year of birth unknown)
- Sir James Harington, 3rd Baronet, Member of Parliament (born 1607)
