= 1681 in England =

- Centuries: 15th; 16th; 17th; 18th; 19th
- Decades: 1660s; 1670s; 1680s; 1690s; 1700s
- See also: Other events of 1681

Events from the year 1681 in England.

== Incumbents ==
- Monarch – Charles II

== Events ==
- 18 January – 'Exclusion Bill Parliament' dissolved.
- 4 March – William Penn receives a royal charter to establish a sectarian colony in the Americas.
- 21–28 March – the Oxford Parliament meets and debates the Exclusion Bill. The Bill is rejected by the House of Lords. No further sessions of parliament are held until after the death of Charles II in 1685.
- 1 July – Oliver Plunkett, Roman Catholic Archbishop of Armagh and Primate of All Ireland, falsely convicted of treason, is hanged, drawn and quartered at Tyburn, London, the last Catholic martyr to die in England. Catholic intriguer Edward Fitzharris is executed on the same day.
- 2 July – Anthony Ashley-Cooper, 1st Earl of Shaftesbury charged with treason, and imprisoned in the Tower of London, but subsequently acquitted.
- 31 August
  - Perjurer Titus Oates is told to leave his state apartments in Whitehall; his fame begins to wane, and he is soon arrested and imprisoned for sedition.
  - Protestant activist Stephen College, convicted of treason, is hanged, drawn and quartered in Oxford.
- 22 December – King Charles II issues a warrant for the building of the Royal Hospital Chelsea for wounded and retired soldiers.

== Publications ==
- John Dryden's political satire Absalom and Achitophel.
- Nahum Tate's play The History of King Lear, adapted from Shakespeare's King Lear with a happy ending (first performed this year at the Duke's Theatre, London).

== Births ==
- 18 March – Esther Johnson, friend of Jonathan Swift (died 1728)
- 28 September – Sir Richard Vyvyan, 3rd Baronet, Cornish Jacobite (died 1736)
- 24 November – Robert Darcy, 3rd Earl of Holderness, politician (died 1721)
- Barton Booth, actor (died 1733)

== Deaths ==
- January – William Walwyn, Leveller (born c. 1600)
- 28 January – Richard Allestree, royalist churchman (born c. 1621)
- c. 30 January – John Watling, buccaneer (year of birth unknown)
- 5 March – Sir Jonathan Trelawny, 2nd Baronet, Member of Parliament (born c. 1623)
- 14 April – Sir Thomas Littleton, 2nd Baronet, Member of Parliament (born c. 1621)
- 18 April – John Loosemore, pipe organ builder (born 1616)
- 9 June – William Lilly, astrologer and occultist (born 1602)
- 26 July – Sir Thomas Isham, 3rd Baronet, aristocrat and diarist (born 1657)
- 14 September (bur.) – Hezekiah Burton, theologian (born 1632)
- 15 December – James Compton, 3rd Earl of Northampton, soldier and politician (born 1622)
- 22 December – Richard Alleine, Puritan clergyman (born 1611)
- Elizabeth Knepp, actress (year of birth unknown)
