= 1668 in England =

- Centuries: 15th; 16th; 17th; 18th; 19th
- Decades: 1640s; 1650s; 1660s; 1670s; 1680s
- See also: Other events of 1668

Events from the year 1668 in England.

== Monarchs ==
- Monarch – Charles II

== Events ==
- 17 January – George Villiers, 2nd Duke of Buckingham, fights a duel with Francis Talbot, 11th Earl of Shrewsbury (with whose wife he was having an affair) in which the latter is fatally wounded and a second is killed.
- 23 January – England signs the Triple Alliance with the Dutch Republic and Sweden.
- 13 February – Charles II mediates a peace treaty between Spain and Portugal.
- 13 April – John Dryden becomes Poet Laureate.
- April (traditional date) – Actress Nell Gwyn becomes the King's mistress.
- 7 May – Queen Catherine miscarries.
- May – The King's former mistress, Barbara Castlemaine, leaves the Court and is pensioned.
- 21 September – The British East India Company takes over Bombay under a Royal Charter of 27 March.
- December – William Penn imprisoned for nearly 8 months in the Tower of London for writing a pamphlet attacking Trinitarian doctrine.

=== Undated ===
- The Forest of Dean is re-established as a royal forest.
- Isaac Newton builds the first reflecting telescope (Newton's reflector)
- Richard Duckworth's Tintinnalogia, or, the Art of Ringing, the first work on change ringing, is compiled and published complete by Fabian Stedman in London.
- George Villiers, 2nd Duke of Buckingham, probably originates the field sport of organised fox hunting in England with The Bilsdale Hunt in Yorkshire.
- 1668 or 1669 – James, Duke of York, the heir to the throne, secretly takes Eucharist in the Roman Catholic Church.

== Births ==
- November (baptised) – Thomas Woolston, deist (died 1733)
- December (baptised) – Sarah Fyge Egerton, poet (died 1723)
- John Eccles, composer (died 1735)
- Approximate date
  - Thomas Archer, baroque architect (died 1743)
  - John Poulett, 1st Earl Poulett (died 1743)

== Deaths ==
- 21 February – John Thurloe, Puritan spy (born 1616)
- 16 March – Francis Talbot, 11th Earl of Shrewsbury (born 1623)
- 7 April – Sir William Davenant, poet (born 1606)
- 19 September – Sir William Waller, English Civil War general (born c. 1635)
- 17 November – Joseph Alleine, English non–conformist preacher (born 1634)
- probable date – Daniel Blagrave, Member of Parliament (born 1603)
