= 1665 in England =

- Centuries: 15th; 16th; 17th; 18th; 19th
- Decades: 1640s; 1650s; 1660s; 1670s; 1680s
- See also: Other events of 1665

Events from the year 1665 in England.

== Incumbents ==
- Monarch – Charles II

== Events ==
- 4 March – beginning of the Second Anglo-Dutch War.
- 6 March – the Philosophical Transactions of the Royal Society of London begins publication, the first scientific journal in English and the oldest to be continuously published.
- 7 March – HMS London accidentally explodes in the Thames Estuary killing 300 with only 24 survivors.
- March – Nell Gwyn, perhaps aged just 15, makes her first definitely recorded appearance as an actress on the London stage, in John Dryden's heroic drama The Indian Emperour, having previously been a theatre orange-seller.
- 12 April – the first recorded victim of the Great Plague of London dies. Over the summer it is thought to have spread as far as Derby and on 6 September the first plague death takes place in the Derbyshire village of Eyam.
- 19 May – Great Fire of Newport, Shropshire.
- 3 June (13 June N.S.) – Second Anglo-Dutch War: English naval victory at the Battle of Lowestoft.
- 12 June – the city of New Amsterdam in the Province of New York is reincorporated as New York, named after James, Duke of York, and the first Mayor appointed.
- 7 July – the King and court leave London to avoid the plague, moving first to Salisbury, then (from 25 September) Oxford.
- 2 August – Second Anglo-Dutch War: Dutch naval victory at the Battle of Vågen off Norway.
- 21 September – consecration of new chapel at Pembroke College, Cambridge, Christopher Wren's first completed work of architecture.
- 9 October – the Cavalier Parliament assembles in Oxford to avoid the Plague in London.
- 31 October – Parliament passes the Five Mile Act preventing non-conformist ministers from coming within five miles of incorporated towns or the place of their former livings.
- 7 November – The London Gazette begins publication as The Oxford Gazette.
- Great Fire of Rolvenden, Kent.
- Royal Navy Dockyard established at Sheerness for storage and refitting.

== Publications ==
- John Bunyan's The Resurrection.
- Richard Head's The English Rogue.
- Robert Hooke's Micrographia.

== Births ==
- 6 February – Anne, Queen of Great Britain (died 1714)
- March – Sir William Strickland, 3rd Baronet, Member of Parliament (died 1724)
- 1 May – John Woodward, naturalist (died 1728)
- 27 August – John Hervey, 1st Earl of Bristol, politician (died 1751)
- September – Sir Thomas Frankland, 2nd Baronet, Member of Parliament (died 1726)
- 5 November – Sir William Brownlow, 4th Baronet, Member of Parliament (died 1701)
- 28 December – George FitzRoy, 1st Duke of Northumberland, general, illegitimate son of Charles II (died 1716)
- William Cowper, 1st Earl Cowper, Lord Chancellor (died 1723)
- Charles Gildon, writer (died 1724)
- Benjamin Johnson, actor (died 1742)

== Deaths ==
- 9 March – Thomas Wentworth, 5th Baron Wentworth, soldier and politician (born 1612)
- 3 June – Charles Weston, 3rd Earl of Portland (born 1639)
- 18 July (bur.) – Elizabeth Stanhope, Countess of Chesterfield (born 1640)
- 11 July – Kenelm Digby, privateer (born 1603)
- 25 August – Charles Seymour, 2nd Baron Seymour of Trowbridge (born c. 1621)
- 17 November – John Earle, bishop (born c. 1601)
- 19 November (bur.) – Elizabeth Cromwell, Lady Protectress (born 1598)
- Walter Acton, Member of Parliament (born c. 1620)
