= 1829 in the United Kingdom =

Events from the year 1829 in the United Kingdom.

== Incumbents ==
- Monarch – George IV
- Prime Minister – Arthur Wellesley, 1st Duke of Wellington (Tory)
- Foreign Secretary – George Hamilton-Gordon, 4th Earl of Aberdeen
- Home Secretary – Robert Peel
- Secretary of War – George Murray

== Events ==
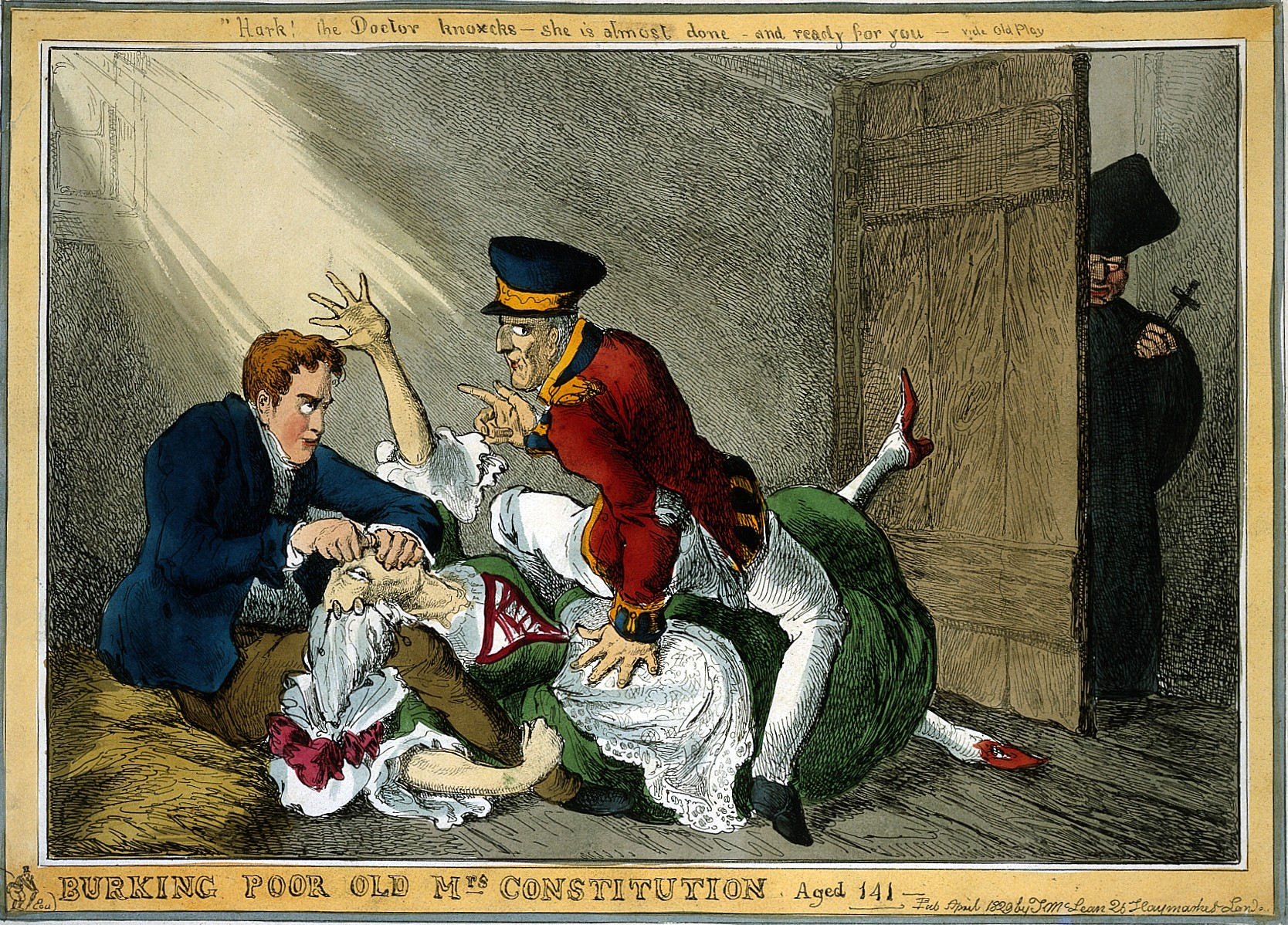
Burking Poor Old Mrs Constitution, Aged 141 by William Heath: The Duke of Wellington and Robert Peel as Burke and Hare smother the Bill of Rights 1689 by the Roman Catholic Relief Act

- 8 January – Hanging of body-selling murderer William Burke in Edinburgh. His associate William Hare, who has testified against him, is released.
- 26 January – First performance of Douglas Jerrold's comic nautical melodrama Black-Eyed Susan; or, All in the Downs at the Surrey Theatre in Lambeth; it will run for a new record of well over 150 performances.
- 1–2 February – York Minster is extensively damaged in a fire started by Jonathan Martin (who is subsequently acquitted of arson on the grounds of insanity).
- March 5 – Jack Adams, last of the Bounty mutineers, dies on Pitcairn Island.
- 21 March – Wellington–Winchilsea duel. A duel is fought between the Prime Minister (the Duke of Wellington) and George Finch-Hatton, 10th Earl of Winchilsea, in Battersea Fields, provoked by the Duke's support for Catholic emancipation and foundation of the secular King's College London. Deliberately off-target shots are fired by both and honour is satisfied without injury.
- 27 March – Zoological Society of London receives its royal charter.
- April–September – The composer Felix Mendelssohn pays his first visit to Britain. This includes (June) the first London performance of his concert overture to A Midsummer Night's Dream and (August) his trip to Fingal's Cave.
- 13 April – Passage of the Roman Catholic Relief Act by Parliament of the United Kingdom granting Catholic emancipation.
- 5 June – Slave trade: HMS Pickle captures the armed slave ship Voladora off the coast of Cuba.
- 10 June – The Oxford University Boat Club wins the first inter-university Boat Race, rowed at Henley-on-Thames.
- 19 June – Robert Peel's Metropolitan Police Act establishes the Metropolitan Police Service.
- 30 June – Henry Robinson Palmer files a patent application for corrugated iron for use in buildings.
- 4 July – George Shillibeer begins operating the first bus service in London.
- 2–3 August – The "Muckle Spate", a great flood of the River Findhorn which devastates much of Strathspey, Scotland, washing away many bridges.
- 14 August – King's College London founded by Royal Charter
- 29 September – The first police officers of the Metropolitan Police Service, known by the nicknames "bobbies" or "peelers", go on patrol in London.

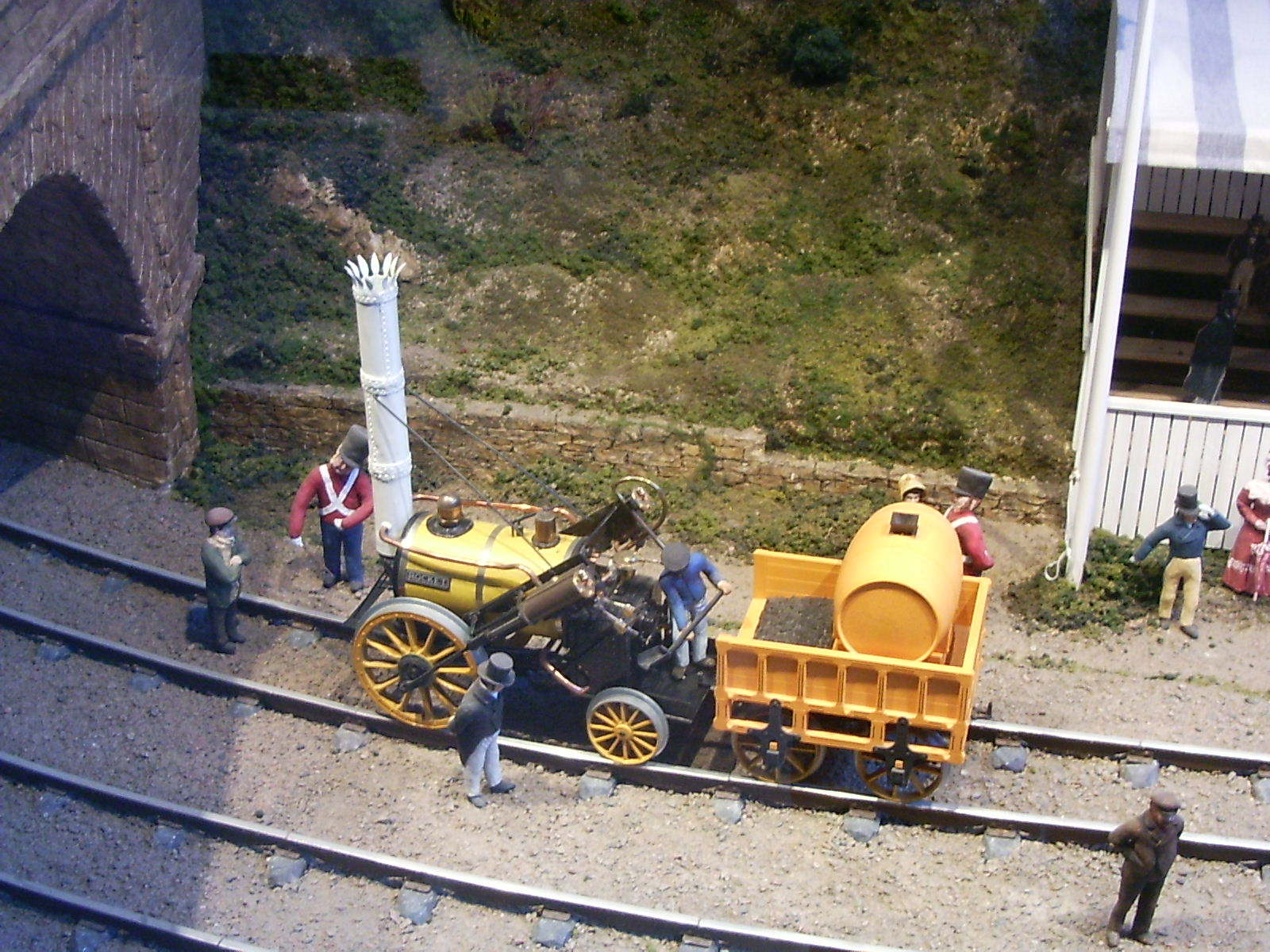
Stephenson's Rocket at The Rainhill Trials (model)

- 8 October – Robert Stephenson's steam locomotive Rocket defeats John Ericsson's Novelty and other competitors and thus wins the Rainhill Trials held on the under-construction Liverpool and Manchester Railway.
- 4 December – In the face of fierce opposition, Lord William Bentinck carries a regulation declaring that all who abet suttee in India are guilty of culpable homicide.
- 31 December – Last British hanging for forgery, Thomas Maynard at Newgate Prison, London.

=== Ongoing ===
- Anglo-Ashanti war (1823–1831)

== Publications ==
- Thomas Carlyle's essay Signs of the Times.
- Thomas Love Peacock's historical romance The Misfortunes of Elphin (as "by the author of Headlong Hall").
- Sir Walter Scott's historical novel Anne of Geierstein (as "by the author of Waverley").

== Births ==
- 17 January – Catherine Booth, Mother of The Salvation Army (died 1890)
- 2 February – William Stanley, inventor (died 1909)
- 6 March – Arthur Blomfield, architect (died 1899)
- 10 April – William Booth, founder of The Salvation Army (died 1912)
- 4 June – Allan Octavian Hume, member of the Indian civil service and "the Father of Indian Ornithology" (died 1912)
- 5 June – George Stephen, 1st Baron Mount Stephen, Scottish-born businessman in Canada and philanthropist (died 1921)
- 8 June – John Everett Millais, Pre-Raphaelite painter (died 1896)
- 16 June – Bessie Rayner Parkes, journalist and feminist (died 1925)
- 14 July – Edward White Benson, Archbishop of Canterbury (died 1896)
- 25 July – Elizabeth Siddal, Pre-Raphaelite artists' model, painter and poet (died 1862)
- 25 September – William Michael Rossetti, critic (died 1919)
- 9 November – Sir Peter Lumsden, Scottish general in the Indian army (died 1918)
- John Lowther du Plat Taylor, founder of the Army Post Office Corps (died 1904)

== Deaths ==
- 15 January – John Mastin, local historian, memoirist and clergyman (born 1747)
- 25 January – William Shield, composer, violinist and violist (born 1748)
- 28 January – William Burke, murderer and grave robber, executed (born 1792 in Ireland)
- 1 March – Thomas Earnshaw, watchmaker (born 1749)
- 8 May – Charles Abbot, 1st Baron Colchester, barrister, statesman, Speaker of the House of Commons (born 1759)
- 10 May – Thomas Young, physician and linguist (born 1773)
- 29 May – Sir Humphry Davy, chemist (born 1778)
- 27 June – James Smithson, mineralogist, chemist and sponsor of the Smithsonian Institution (born 1765)
- 7 August – John Reeves, conservative activist, public servant and legal historian (born 1752)
- 10 October – Maria Elizabetha Jacson, botanist (born 1755)
- 28 December – Bill Richmond, bare-knuckle welterweight boxer (born 1763 in British America)
