= 1675 in England =

- Centuries: 15th; 16th; 17th; 18th; 19th
- Decades: 1650s; 1660s; 1670s; 1680s; 1690s
- See also: Other events of 1675

Events from the year 1675 in England.

== Incumbents ==
- Monarch – Charles II

== Events ==
- 27 February – Matthew Locke's "semi-opera" Psyche premieres at the Duke's Theatre in London.
- 4 March – John Flamsteed appointed as "astronomical observator", in effect, the first Astronomer Royal.
- 25 March – loss of HMY Mary off Anglesey; 35 die.
- 13 April – Parliament refuses to vote funds for Charles II and is suspended after sitting for just nine weeks.
- 21 June – reconstruction of St Paul's Cathedral in London under Christopher Wren begins to replace that destroyed by the Great Fire of London in 1666.
- April – English merchant Anthony de la Roché, blown off course after rounding Cape Horn eastabout, makes the first discovery of land south of the Antarctic Convergence, landing on South Georgia and (probably) Gough Island.
- 10 August – King Charles places the foundation stone of the Royal Observatory, Greenwich near London.
- 20 September – the Great Fire of Northampton occurs in the county town.
- December – King Charles issues a "Proclamation for the suppression of Coffee Houses" due to the political activity which is occurring in the newly popular establishments; it is quickly rescinded.

=== Undated ===
- The Green Ribbon Club founded; the earliest political club, based in Fleet Street.
- Bethlem Hospital, London, moves to new buildings in Moorfields, designed by Robert Hooke.
- Briggflatts Meeting House built near Sedbergh.

== Publications ==
- William Wycherley's satirical play The Country Wife.

== Births ==
- 1 April – George Shelvocke, privateer (died 1742)
- 29 May – Humphry Ditton, mathematician (died 1715)
- 2 September – William Somervile, poet (died 1742)
- 11 October – Samuel Clarke, philosopher (died 1729)
- 24 October – Richard Temple, 1st Viscount Cobham, soldier and politician (died 1749)
- Edmund Curll, bookseller and publisher (died 1757)

== Deaths ==
- 28 July – Bulstrode Whitelocke, lawyer (born 1605)
- 28 November – Basil Feilding, 2nd Earl of Denbigh, English Civil War soldier (born c. 1608)
- 6 December – John Lightfoot, churchman and scholar (born 1602)
- Humphrey Henchman, Bishop of London (born 1592)
