= 1683 in England =

- Centuries: 15th; 16th; 17th; 18th; 19th
- Decades: 1660s; 1670s; 1680s; 1690s; 1700s
- See also: Other events of 1683

Events from the year 1683 in England.

== Incumbents ==
- Monarch – Charles II

== Events ==
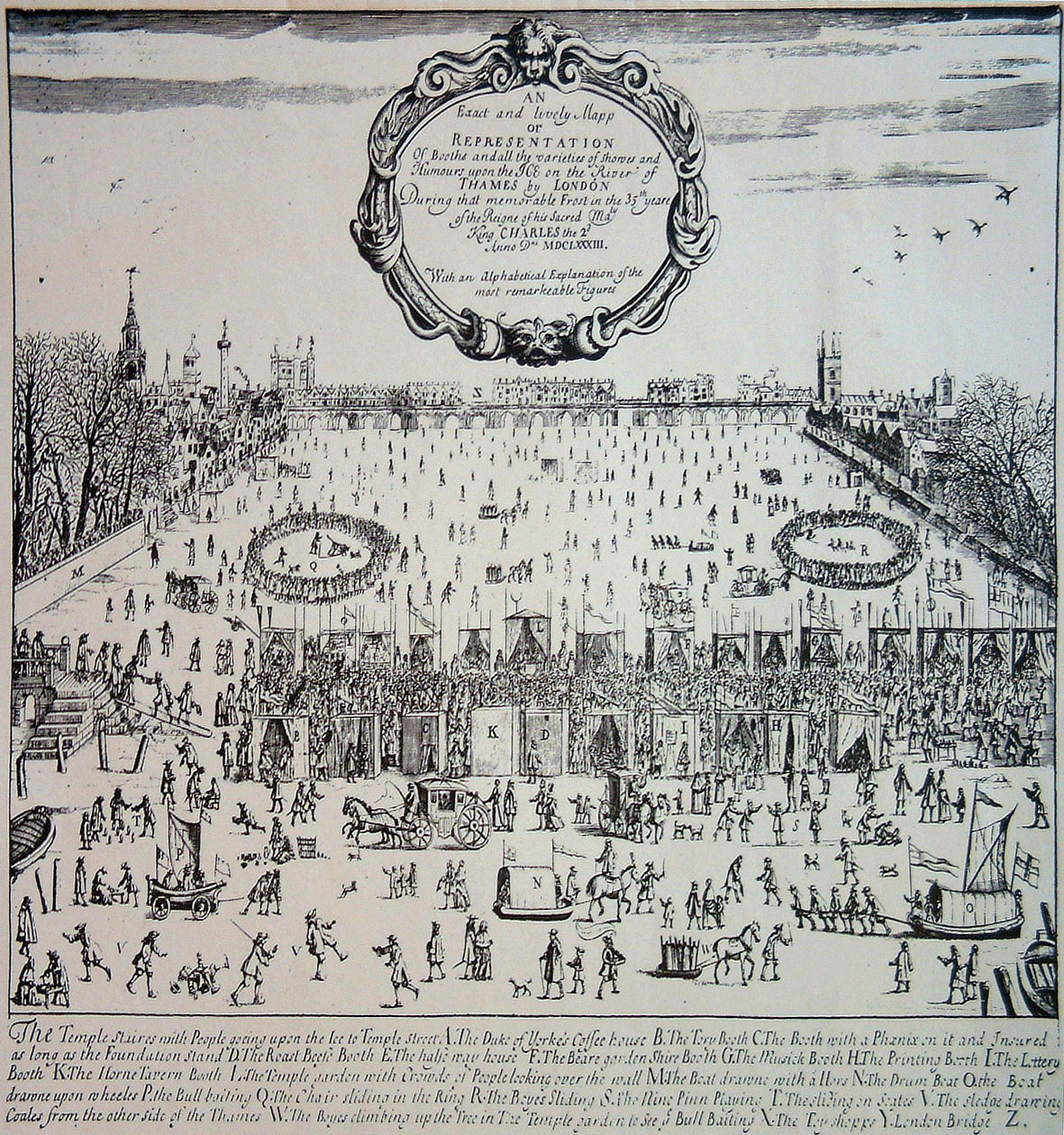
River Thames frost fair

- 9 January – Charles II gives orders establishing the dates on which he will perform the "Touching the King's Evil" ceremony.
- 22 March – great fire in Newmarket, Suffolk, consuming half the houses and forcing Charles II (who is in residence) to flee the town.
- 24 May – the Ashmolean Museum, Oxford, opens as the world's first purpose-built university museum.
- 12 June – the Rye House Plot to assassinate Charles II is discovered; at least 11 people will be executed for their connections with it.
- 21 July – Lord Russell is beheaded by Jack Ketch at Lincoln's Inn Fields for his part in the Rye House Plot.
- 28 July – The Lady Anne, the King's niece and fourth in line of succession, marries Prince George of Denmark in the Chapel Royal at St James's Palace, London.
- 12 December – start of exceptional cold spell. The River Thames freezes, allowing a frost fair to be held (pictured).

=== Undated ===
- Wild boars are hunted to extinction in Britain.
- The London Jilt; or, the Politick Whore, probably by Alexander Oldys, is published.

== Births ==
- 1 March – Caroline of Ansbach, queen of George II of Great Britain (died 1737)
- 3 April – Mark Catesby, naturalist (died 1749)
- 25 October – Charles FitzRoy, 2nd Duke of Grafton, politician (died 1757)
- 10 November – King George II of Great Britain (died 1760)
- 27 December – Conyers Middleton, minister (died 1750)

== Deaths ==
- 15 January – Philip Warwick, writer and politician (born 1609)
- 21 January – Anthony Ashley-Cooper, 1st Earl of Shaftesbury, politician (born 1621)
- 19 March – Thomas Killigrew, dramatist (born 1612)
- 13 July – Arthur Capell, 1st Earl of Essex, statesman, implicated in Rye House Plot, suicide (born 1631)
- 18 August – Charles Hart, actor (born 1625)
- 21 July – William Russell, Lord Russell, politician, executed (born 1639)
- 24 August – John Owen, non-conformist theologian (born 1616)
- 25 October – William Scroggs, lord chief justice of England (born c. 1623)
- 7 December
  - John Oldham, poet (born 1653)
  - Algernon Sidney, parliamentarian and republican, executed (born 1623)
- 15 December – Izaak Walton, writer (born 1593)
- John Hingston, court composer, viol player and organist (born 1612)
