= 1671 in England =

- Centuries: 15th; 16th; 17th; 18th; 19th
- Decades: 1650s; 1660s; 1670s; 1680s; 1690s
- See also: Other events of 1671

Events from the year 1671 in England.

== Incumbents ==
- Monarch – Charles II

== Events ==
Colonel Blood Stealing the Crown Jewels by Henry Perronet Briggs

- February – Nell Gwyn retires from the stage and moves into a brick townhouse at 79 Pall Mall, London.
- 13 March – The Parliament of England addresses the King against the growth of popery.
- 22 March – The Sabine baronetcy is created for John Sabine.
- 31 March – The Royal Navy launches 102-gun HMS Royal James at Portsmouth Royal Dockyard, its first warship to have a frame reinforced by iron bars rather than an all wooden ship, an innovation by naval architect Anthony Deane.
- c. 23 April – First record of ice cream being served in England, to the King at Windsor.
- 9 May – "Colonel" Thomas Blood, disguised as a clergyman, attempts to steal the Crown Jewels from the Tower of London but is caught before he can get away with the loot. He is later condemned to death and then pardoned and exiled by King Charles II.
- 6 September – The Royal Court dispatches a letter to the "King of Formosa" (Zheng Jing, ruler of the Kingdom of Tungning) confirming that English ships will be welcome to trade at the "City of Tywan" (Taipei on the island of Taiwan).
- 9 November – The Duke of York's Theatre is opened at Dorset Garden in London by the players of the Duke's Company.
- Late – French lady-in-waiting Louise de Kérouaille becomes a mistress to the King.

== Publications ==
- John Milton's epic poem Paradise Regained.

== Births ==
- 26 February – Anthony Ashley-Cooper, 3rd Earl of Shaftesbury, English politician and philosopher (died 1713)
- 6 November – Colley Cibber, poet laureate, playwright and actor-manager (died 1757)
- 15 November (bapt.) – Anne Bracegirdle, actress (died 1748)

== Deaths ==
- 31 March – Anne Hyde, wife of the future James II of England (born 1637)
- 5 May – Edward Montagu, 2nd Earl of Manchester, politician (born 1602)
- 14 July – Méric Casaubon, classical scholar (born 1599)
- 26 October – Sir John Gell, 1st Baronet, politician (born 1593)
- 12 November – Thomas Fairfax, 3rd Lord Fairfax of Cameron, Civil War general (born 1612)
