= 1678 in England =

- Centuries: 15th; 16th; 17th; 18th; 19th
- Decades: 1650s; 1660s; 1670s; 1680s; 1690s
- See also: Other events of 1678

Events from the year 1678 in England.

== Incumbents ==
- Monarch – Charles II

== Events ==
- 10 January – England and the Dutch Republic sign a mutual alliance against France.
- 21 March – Thomas Shadwell's comedy A True Widow is given its first performance, at The Duke's Theatre in London, staged by the Duke's Company.
- 31 May – the Godiva Procession, a commemoration held in honour of Lady Godiva's legendary 11th century naked horseback ride through the streets of Coventry in protest against her husband's treatment of the citizens, begins.
- 6 September – Titus Oates first presents sworn allegations of the "Popish Plot", a supposed Catholic conspiracy to assassinate King Charles II. On 28 September before the Privy Council he makes allegations against numerous Jesuits and Catholic nobles. Oates applies the term Tory to those who disbelieve his allegations.
- 17 October – magistrate Sir Edmund Berry Godfrey is found murdered in Primrose Hill, London. Titus Oates claims it as a proof of his allegations.
- 25 October – five Catholic peers accused of involvement in the "Popish Plot" are arrested at the instance of the House of Commons and committed to the Tower of London. On 1 November, impeachment proceedings begin.
- 26 November – William Staley, a Catholic banker, becomes the first person to be executed in connection with the "Popish Plot".
- 3 December – the Test Act provides that members of both the House of Lords and House of Commons must swear an anti-Catholic oath before taking office.
- Second Burying in Woollen Act, to support the home textile industry, more rigidly enforced.

== Publications ==
- 18 February – John Bunyan's The Pilgrim's Progress.
- John Dryden's play All for Love.

== Births ==
- July – Thomas Hearne, antiquarian (died 1735)
- 16 September – Henry St John, 1st Viscount Bolingbroke, statesman and philosopher (died 1751)
- 8 December – Horatio Walpole, 1st Baron Walpole of Wolterton, diplomat (died 1757)
- 14 December – Daniel Neal, historian (died 1743)
- 30 December – William Croft, composer (died 1727)

== Deaths ==
- 12 April – Mary Rich, Countess of Warwick, courtier and diarist (born 1625 in Ireland)
- 16 August – Andrew Marvell, writer (born 1621)
- 28 August – John Berkeley, 1st Baron Berkeley of Stratton, soldier (born 1602)
- 12 October – Edmund Berry Godfrey, magistrate (born 1621)
- 1 November – William Coddington, first Governor of Rhode Island (born 1601)
