= 1674 in England =

- Centuries: 15th; 16th; 17th; 18th; 19th
- Decades: 1650s; 1660s; 1670s; 1680s; 1690s
- See also: Other events of 1674

Events from the year 1674 in England.

== Incumbents ==
- Monarch – Charles II

== Events ==
- 15 January – The Earl of Arlington is impeached by the House of Commons on charges of popery, but the Commons rejects the motion to remove him from office, 127 votes for and 166 against.
- 9 February (19 February New Style) – England and the Dutch Republic sign the Treaty of Westminster ending the Third Anglo-Dutch War.
- 14 March – Third Anglo-Dutch War: Battle of Ronas Voe – the English Royal Navy captures the Dutch East India Company ship Wapen van Rotterdam in Shetland.
- 26 March – Theatre Royal, Drury Lane, London, re-opens, having been rebuilt after a fire in 1672.
- 25 April – Great Fire of Watton, Norfolk.
- 12 June – the British East India Company arranges a commercial treaty with the Maratha Empire after Henry Oxenden, the company's deputy governor, meets Emperor Shivaji at his recent coronation.
- 17 July – two skeletons of children are discovered at the White Tower (Tower of London) and believed at this time to be the remains of the Princes in the Tower. The remains are subsequently buried in Westminster Abbey.
- 10 November – as provided in the Treaty of Westminster of 19 February, the Dutch Republic cedes its colony of New Netherland to England. This includes the colonial capital, New Orange, which is returned to its English name of New York.

== Publications ==
- The second edition of John Milton's epic poem Paradise Lost is published, shortly before the writer's death in November, by Samuel Simmons in London.

== Births ==
- 8 February – Henry Sacheverell, churchman and politician (died 1724)
- 24 January – Thomas Tanner, bishop and antiquarian (died 1735)
- March – Jethro Tull, agriculturist (died 1741)
- 18 April – Charles Townshend, 2nd Viscount Townshend, statesman (died 1738)
- 20 June – Nicholas Rowe, dramatist (died 1718)
- 3 July – James Annesley, 3rd Earl of Anglesey (died 1702)
- 17 July – Isaac Watts, hymnist (died 1748)
- 11 September – Elizabeth Rowe, poet and novelist (died 1737)
- 18 October – Beau Nash, dandy (died 1762)
- Approximate date
  - Jeremiah Clarke, composer (suicide 1707)
  - Spencer Compton, 1st Earl of Wilmington, Prime Minister of Great Britain (died 1743)
  - John Potter, Archbishop of Canterbury (died 1747)

== Deaths ==
- 23 March – Henry Cromwell, soldier, politician and lord lieutenant of Ireland (born 1628)
- 10 October – Thomas Traherne, poet (born c. 1637)
- 15 October – Robert Herrick, poet (born 1591)
- 8 November – John Milton, poet (born 1608)
- 9 December – Edward Hyde, 1st Earl of Clarendon, statesman and historian (born 1609)
