= 1685 in England =

- Centuries: 15th; 16th; 17th; 18th; 19th
- Decades: 1660s; 1670s; 1680s; 1690s; 1700s
- See also: Other events of 1685

Events from the year 1685 in England. This year sees a change of monarch.

== Incumbents ==
- Monarch – Charles II (until 6 February), then James II

== Events ==
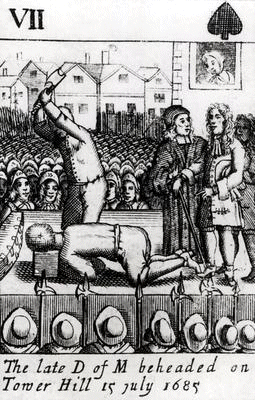
The Duke of Monmouth beheaded on Tower Hill following failure of the Monmouth Rebellion

- 6 February – death of Charles II at Whitehall Palace after four days' illness, having been received into the Roman Catholic church on the previous evening. His brother, the Catholic James Stuart, Duke of York, becomes King James II of England.
- 23 April – coronation of King James II at Westminster Abbey, including anthems by Henry Purcell.
- May – Titus Oates, found guilty of perjury for his part in the alleged "Popish Plot", is sentenced by Judge Jeffreys to be imprisoned, pilloried (at Temple Bar, London) and whipped.
- 19 May – beginning of the first session of the Loyal Parliament.
- 11 June – Monmouth Rebellion: James Scott, 1st Duke of Monmouth, illegitimate son of King Charles II of England, Scotland and Ireland, lands at Lyme Regis with an invasion force brought from the Dutch Republic to challenge his uncle, James II, for the Crown of England.
- 20 June – Monmouth Rebellion: James, Duke of Monmouth, declares himself at Taunton to be King and heir to his father's Kingdoms as James II of England and Ireland and James VII of Scotland.
- 6 July – Monmouth Rebellion: the Battle of Sedgemoor between the armies of King James II and rebel forces under Monmouth, the last pitched battle fought on English soil. Monmouth's army is defeated and the Duke himself is captured shortly after the battle.
- 15 July – the Duke of Monmouth is beheaded at Tower Hill, London, by Jack Ketch with several blows of the axe.
- 25 August to 23 September – Lord Chief Justice Jeffreys holds the Bloody Assizes to try Monmouth's supporters, beginning at Winchester and ending at Wells. Over a thousand receive sentences of hanging or transportation.
- 28 September – Jeffreys is appointed Lord Chancellor by the king.
- 29 September – the first organised street lighting, using oil lamps, is established in London by Edward Hemming.
- 22 October – Louis XIV of France issues the Edict of Fontainebleau, which revokes the Edict of Nantes and declares Protestantism illegal in his country, causing Huguenot refugees to flee to England and elsewhere; among them is the Toyé family, who establish the jewellery and clothing business which, as Toye, Kenning and Spencer, will still be operating in the hands of the original family in the 21st century.
- 23 October – Elizabeth Gaunt, humanitarian, burned at the stake at Tyburn for alleged complicity in the Rye House Plot, becomes the last woman executed for political treason in England. She is not granted the customary mercy of strangulation before burning.
- November – at the king's request, Ferdinando d'Adda is sent as the first Papal Nuncio to England since 1558.
- 20 November – the Loyal Parliament is prorogued and never meets again.
- Alice Molland becomes the last known person in England to be sentenced to death for witchcraft, in Exeter.

== Births ==
- 10 February – Aaron Hill, writer (died 1750)
- 12 March – George Berkeley, philosopher (died 1753)
- 30 June – John Gay, writer (died 1732)
- 3 July – Sir Robert Rich, 4th Baronet, cavalry officer (died 1768)
- 18 August – Brook Taylor, mathematician (died 1731)
- 17 December – Thomas Tickell, writer (died 1740)

== Deaths ==
- 2 January – Sir Harbottle Grimston, 2nd Baronet, politician (born 1603)
- 6 February – King Charles II of England (born 1630)
- 24 February – Charles Howard, 1st Earl of Carlisle, politician and military leader (born 1629)
- 14 April – Thomas Otway, dramatist (born 1652)
- 16 June – Anne Killigrew, poet and painter (born 1660)
- 22 June – Thomas Dangerfield, conspirator, homicide (born c. 1650)
- 15 July – James Scott, 1st Duke of Monmouth, illegitimate son of Charles II, executed (born 1649)
- 28 July – Henry Bennet, 1st Earl of Arlington, statesman (born 1618)
- 23 October – Henry Cornish, London alderman, executed
- 30 October – executed
  - John Ayloffe, political radical (born c. 1645)
  - Richard Nelthorpe, lawyer and conspirator
- 12 December – John Pell, mathematician (born 1610)
