= 1590s in England =

Events from the 1590s in England.

== Incumbents ==
- Monarch – Elizabeth I

== Events ==
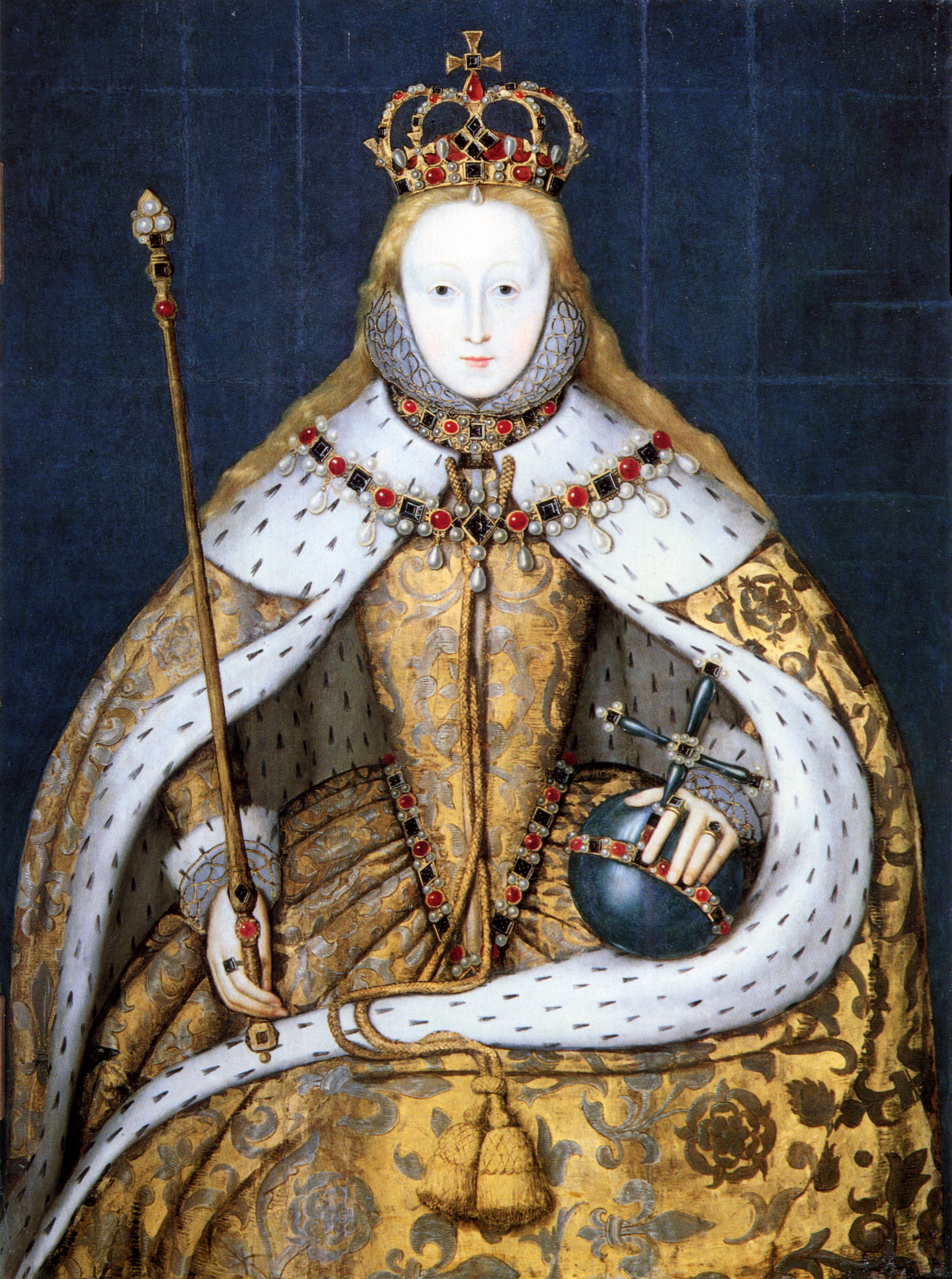
Elizabeth I

1590

  - Publication of Edmund Spenser's poetry The Faerie Queene and his satire Mother Hubbard's Tale.
  - Publication of Thomas Lodge's prose tale Rosalynde: Euphues Golden Legacie.
- 1591
  - 10 April – Merchant James Lancaster sets off on a voyage to the East Indies.
  - 22 July – The Durtnell (Dartnell) family of Brasted, Kent, begin to work as building contractors. The business continues under thirteen generations of the family until ceasing to trade in 2019.
  - 30 August–1 September – Anglo-Spanish War (1585–1604): Battle of Flores off Flores Island (Azores) – the fleet of Spain is victorious over the English; English ship Revenge is captured on 1 September (and Richard Grenville fatally wounded) but soon afterwards is among many ships lost with all hands in a week-long Atlantic hurricane.
  - 11 September – Completion of My Ladye Nevells Booke, a manuscript anthology of keyboard music by William Byrd.
  - 3 November – Rebel Irish lord Brian O'Rourke is hanged at Tyburn having been extradited from Scotland and tried in London for treasons committed in Ireland.
  - John Harington translates Ludovico Ariosto's Orlando furioso into English.
  - Probable first production of William Shakespeare's play Henry VI, Part 1 and writing of Henry VI, Part 2 and Part 3; approximate date of writing of Richard III.
  - Posthumous publication of Sir Philip Sidney's poetry Astrophel and Stella.
  - Nicholas Bacon completes the building of his red brick mansion, Culford Hall, in Suffolk, planting an oak in Culford Park which, as "King of the Park", will still be flowering in the 21st century.
- 1592
  - May/June – Case of the Swans, a landmark decision in English property law, is decided in the Exchequer of Pleas: wild animals cannot be given by transfer or taken by prescription.
  - August – 1592–93 London plague outbreak first observed: over 19,000 deaths in London and its surrounding parishes up to December 1593. Theatres in London are consequently closed for much of the period.
  - 7 September – The great Portuguese carrack the Madre de Deus, captured on 3 August at the fierce Battle of Flores (1592) in the Azores, enters Dartmouth harbour and is subjected to mass theft.
  - 26 September – A "strange fish", probably an ocean sunfish, is washed ashore at Dripole near Kingston upon Hull.
  - 3 November – Sir John Perrot, former Lord Deputy of Ireland, dies in the Tower of London awaiting sentence for a conviction for high treason.
  - Henry Constable's Diana, one of the first sonnet sequences in English, is published in London.
  - approximate date – First performance of Shakespeare's play Richard III.
- 1593
  - January – John Norden commissioned to make maps of all the counties of England.
  - 23 February – Peter Wentworth imprisoned for raising the issue of succession to the throne in Parliament.
  - 6 April – Witches of Warboys: Alice, John and Agnes Samuel found guilty of witchcraft and hanged.
  - 18 April – Anglo-Spanish War: Naval Battle of Blaye in the Gironde estuary sees a Spanish victory over the blockading English fleet, allowing the Spanish to relieve the French Catholic garrison of Blaye.
  - After April – William Shakespeare's poem Venus and Adonis probably becomes his first published work, printed in London from his own manuscript. In his lifetime it will be his most frequently reprinted work: at least nine times.
  - 5 May – "Dutch church libel": bills posted in London threatening Protestant refugees from France and the Netherlands allude to Christopher Marlowe's plays.
  - 12 May – Arrest of dramatist Thomas Kyd in connection with the "Dutch church libel". "Atheist" literature found in his home is claimed to be Marlowe's.
  - 18 May – A warrant for the arrest of Christopher Marlowe is issued. On 20 May he presents himself to the Privy Council.
  - 29 May – Execution of the Welsh Protestant John Penry suspected of involvement with the Marprelate Controversy.
  - 30 May – Marlowe is stabbed to death in a dispute over the bill at a lodging house in Deptford.
  - 12 June – Sir Richard Hawkins sails from Plymouth to the South American Pacific with the aim of emulating the circumnavigation voyage of his cousin Drake. His squadron consists of the galleon Dainty (flagship), the storeship Hawk and the pinnace Fancy.
  - Irish pirate queen Grace O'Malley meets with Queen Elizabeth at Greenwich.
  - Sir Thomas Tresham designs and begins construction of Rushton Triangular Lodge in Northamptonshire, symbolic of his Catholic recusancy.
- 1594
  - May – Nine Years' War: in Ireland, Hugh O'Neill, 2nd Earl of Tyrone and Hugh Roe O'Donnell form an alliance to try to overthrow English domination.
  - 7 June – Roderigo Lopez executed for allegedly trying to poison Queen Elizabeth.
  - 1 or 2 July – Anglo-Spanish War: Hawkins is defeated in the South American Pacific by the Spanish Beltrán de Castro in the action of Atacames Bay, being captured along with his flagship.
  - Christmas – Students of Gray's Inn perform The Maske of Proteus and the Adamantine Rock before the Queen. Written by Francis Davison with music by Thomas Campion, it is probably the first staged masque in England.
  - First known performances and publication of Shakespeare's Titus Andronicus in London.
  - Publication of Shakespeare's narrative poem The Rape of Lucrece.
  - Posthumous publication of Marlowe's play Edward II.
  - Thomas Nashe's picaresque novel The Unfortunate Traveller published.
  - Richard Hooker's Of the Lawes of Ecclesiastical Politie commences publication.
  - Bevis Bulmer sets up a system at Blackfriars to pump water to London.
- 1595
  - 21 February – Catholic martyr Robert Southwell hanged, drawn and quartered at Tyburn, London. His Saint Peters Complaint, with Other Poemes is published in three editions posthumously.
  - 23 July – Spanish raid burns Penzance and Mousehole in Cornwall.
  - Probable first performance of William Shakespeare's plays Richard II, A Midsummer Night's Dream and Romeo and Juliet.
  - Thomas Morley's part song "Now Is the Month of Maying" is first published.
- 1596
  - February – James Burbage buys the disused Blackfriars Theatre in London, but is prevented from reusing it as a public theatre by a November petition by wealthy influential neighbors.
  - 14 February
    - Sidney Sussex College, Cambridge is founded under the supervision of Archbishop John Whitgift.
    - John Whitgift begins building his hospital at Croydon.
  - June – Sir John Norreys and Sir Geoffrey Fenton travel to Connaught to parley with the local Irish lords.
  - 21 November – Bartholomew Steer attempts to launch a rebellion on Enslow Hill in Oxfordshire.
  - First production of Shakespeare's Merchant of Venice.
  - Richard Johnson's The Famous Historie of the Seaven Champions of Christendom first published.
  - William Slingsby discovers that water from the Tewitt Well mineral spring at Harrogate in North Yorkshire possesses similar properties to that from Spa, Belgium.
  - John Harington describes the "Ajax", a precursor to the modern flush toilet, in The Metamorphosis of Ajax.
- 1597
  - October/November – The 3rd Spanish Armada almost makes landfall after being dispersed by a storm – a number of Spanish ships are captured off the coasts of Wales, Cornwall and Devon.
  - Parliament passes the Vagabonds Act introducing penal transportation of convicted criminals to England's colonies.
  - Gresham College founded in the City of London.
  - Aldenham School founded in Hertfordshire by brewer Richard Platt.
  - Completion of Hardwick Hall in Derbyshire, designed by Robert Smythson for Bess of Hardwick.
  - Approximate date of the first performance of the Shakespeare plays Henry IV, Part 1, Henry IV, Part 2 and King John.
  - Thomas Nashe and Ben Jonson's satirical comedy The Isle of Dogs performed in July or August before being suppressed by the Privy Council for its "slanderous matter".
  - Francis Bacon's first Essays published.
  - Thomas Deloney's Jack of Newbury published.
  - John Gerard's The Herball, or generall historie of plantes published.
  - John Dowland's The Firste Booke of Songes or Ayres published.
- 1598
  - 23 February – Thomas Bodley refounds the Bodleian Library at the University of Oxford.
  - March – Poor Relief Act establishes early workhouses.
  - c. July/September – first performance of Ben Jonson's play Every Man in His Humour, at the Curtain Theatre, Shoreditch.
  - 14 August – Nine Years' War: Battle of the Yellow Ford: Irish rebels under Hugh O'Neill, Earl of Tyrone, rout an English expeditionary force under Henry Bagenal (who is mortally wounded in the action).
  - 22 September – Ben Jonson kills actor Gabriel Spenser in a duel at Hoxton in London and is briefly held in Newgate Prison but escapes capital punishment by pleading benefit of clergy.
  - c. September – Publication of Francis Meres' Palladis Tamia, Wits Treasury, including the first critical discussion of Shakespeare's works.
  - 28 December – In London, The Theatre is dismantled.
  - Montacute House, Somerset, built, a notable early example of an unfortified country residence built completely from new.
  - Publication of the poem Hero and Leander unfinished by Marlowe and completed by George Chapman.
  - Chapman translates Homer's Iliad into English.
  - Publication of John Florio's Italian/English dictionary A World of Words.
  - Publication of John Stow's A Survey of London.
- 1599
  - 1 January – Darcy v. Allein (The Case of Monopolies): The Court of King's Bench decides it is improper for any individual to be allowed a state monopoly over a trade.
  - 12 March – Robert Devereux, 2nd Earl of Essex is appointed Lord Lieutenant of Ireland by Queen Elizabeth I.
  - Spring/Summer – Globe Theatre built in Southwark utilising material from The Theatre.
  - 23 April – Essex in Ireland: Essex arrives in Dublin.
  - 29 May – Nine Years' War: Essex captures Cahir Castle in Munster.
  - 4 June – Bishops' Ban of 1599: Thomas Middleton's Microcynicon: Six Snarling Satires and John Marston's Scourge of Villainy are publicly burned as the ecclesiastical authorities clamp down on published satire.
  - 15 August – Nine Years' War: Irish rebel victory at the Battle of Curlew Pass.
  - 8 September – Essex in Ireland: Essex signs a truce with Hugh O'Neill. He leaves Ireland against the instructions of Queen Elizabeth.
  - 28 September – Essex returns to England and is arrested.
  - Late – War of the Theatres: Satire, being prohibited in print, breaks out in the London theatres. In Histriomastix, Marston satirizes Jonson's pride through the character Chrisoganus; Jonson responds by satirizing Marstons's wordy style in Every Man Out of His Humour, acted by the Lord Chamberlain's Men.
  - Approximate date of the first performances of the Shakespeare plays As You Like It, Much Ado About Nothing, Henry V and Julius Caesar.
  - The publisher William Jaggard issues The Passionate Pilgrime, poems attributed to "W. Shakespeare".
  - Henry Buttes publishes his cookbook Dyets Dry Dinner.

== Births ==
- 1590
  - 30 January – Lady Anne Clifford, noblewoman (died 1676)
  - c. 19 March – William Bradford, governor of Plymouth Colony (died 1657)
  - May – William Cecil, 17th Baron de Ros (died 1618)
  - 31 May – Frances Carr, Countess of Somerset, née Howard (died 1632)
  - 19 August – Henry Rich, 1st Earl of Holland, soldier (died 1649)
  - 27 December – Immanuel Bourne, English cleric (died 1672)
  - Eleanor Davies, prophet (died 1652)
  - Approximate date – William Browne, poet (died 1645)
- 1591
  - 11 January – Robert Devereux, 3rd Earl of Essex, English Civil War general (died 1646)
  - July – Anne Hutchinson, puritan preacher (died 1643)
  - 24 August – Robert Herrick, poet (died 1674)
  - Thomas Goffe, dramatist (died 1629)
  - William Lenthall, politician of the Civil War period (died 1662)
- 1592
  - 20 February – Nicholas Ferrar, trader (died 1637)
  - 11 April – Sir John Eliot, statesman (died 1632)
  - May – Francis Quarles, poet (died 1644)
  - 28 August – George Villiers, 1st Duke of Buckingham, statesman (died 1628)
  - 1 September – John Hacket, churchman (died 1670)
  - 5 November – Charles Chauncy, English-born president of Harvard College (died 1672)
  - 6 December – William Cavendish, 1st Duke of Newcastle (died 1676)
  - 22 December (bapt.) – Humphrey Henchman, Bishop of London (died 1675)
  - John Jenkins, composer (died 1678)
  - Henry King, poet (died 1669)
- 1593
  - 3 April – George Herbert, poet and orator (died 1633)
  - 4 April – Edward Nicholas, statesman (died 1669)
  - 13 April – Thomas Wentworth, 1st Earl of Strafford, statesman (died 1641)
  - 8 July – Peter Sainthill, English politician (died 1648)
  - 9 August – Izaak Walton, writer (died 1683)
  - Francis Russell, 4th Earl of Bedford (died 1641)
  - Mervyn Tuchet, 2nd Earl of Castlehaven (died 1631)
- 1594
  - 29 April – Samuel Fairclough, nonconformist minister (died 1677)
  - 11 June – Thomas Cromwell, 1st Earl of Ardglass, nobleman (died 1653)
  - 23 June – Thomas Tyrrell, judge and politician (died 1672)
  - 30 November – John Cosin, churchman (died 1672)
  - 21 December – Robert Sutton, 1st Baron Lexinton, politician (died 1668)
  - John Bramhall, Anglican clergyman and controversialist (died 1663)
  - Peter Oliver, miniaturist (died 1648)
- 1595
  - March – Ralph Hopton, 1st Baron Hopton, Royalist commander in the English Civil War (died 1652)
  - 23 March – Bevil Grenville, royalist soldier (died 1643)
  - 5 December – Henry Lawes, musician (died 1662)
  - Thomas Carew, poet (died 1640)
  - Miles Corbet, Puritan politician (died 1662)
  - Henry Herbert, Master of the Revels (died 1673)
  - Thomas May, poet and historian (died 1650)
  - Isaac Stearns, settler in North America (died 1671)
- 1596
  - September – James Shirley, dramatist (died 1666)
  - 12 December – Sir Edward Osborne, 1st Baronet, politician (died 1647)
  - Approximate date – Peter Mundy, traveller (died 1667)
- 1597
  - 27 March – William Hyde, Catholic convert, President of English College, Douai (died 1651)
  - 9 April – John Davenport, Puritan clergyman, co-founder of the American colony of New Haven (died 1670)
  - 15 May – Squire Bence, politician (died 1648)
  - 21 August – Roger Twysden, antiquarian and royalist (died 1672)
  - 29 August – Henry Gage, royalist officer in the Civil War (killed in action 1645)
  - 7 October – Captain John Underhill, soldier and colonist (died 1672)
  - 29 October – Matthew Hutton, politician (died 1666)
  - Henry Gellibrand, mathematician (died 1637)
  - Rachel Speght, polemicist and poet
  - Approximate date – Thomas Gage, missionary (died 1656)
- 1598
  - 25 March – Robert Trelawney, politician (died 1643)
  - 26 March – Sir William Lewis, 1st Baronet, politician (died 1677)
  - 28 April – Francis Leigh, 1st Earl of Chichester, politician (died 1653)
  - 19 June – Gilbert Sheldon, Archbishop of Canterbury (died 1677)
  - 27 September – Robert Blake, admiral (died 1657)
  - Mary Bankes, Royalist in the English Civil War, defender of Corfe Castle (died 1661)
  - Elizabeth Bourchier, later Elizabeth Cromwell, Lady Protectress (died 1665)
  - Marmaduke Langdale, Royalist in the English Civil War (died 1661)
  - William Strode, parliamentarian (died 1645)
- 1599
  - 22 January – Robert Petre, 3rd Baron Petre (died 1638)
  - 12 February – Thomas Whitmore, politician (died 1677)
  - 1 March – John Mennes, admiral (died 1671)
  - 9 April – Sir Thomas Mauleverer, 1st Baronet (died 1655)
  - 25 April – Oliver Cromwell, Lord Protector of England, Scotland and Ireland (died 1658)
  - 14 August – Méric Casaubon, classicist (died 1671)
  - 10 October – Samuel Clarke, Puritan minister and biographer (died 1683)
  - 29 November – Peter Heylin, ecclesiastic and polemicist (died 1662)
  - 2 December – Alexander Daniell, proprietor of the Manor of Alverton, Cornwall (died 1668)
  - 14 December – Charles Berkeley, 2nd Viscount Fitzhardinge, politician (died 1668)
  - December – Charlotte Stanley, Countess of Derby, defender of Latham House (died 1664)
  - John Alden, settler of Plymouth Colony (died 1687)
  - Lucy Hay, Countess of Carlisle, socialite (died 1660)
  - George Radcliffe, politician (died 1657)

== Deaths ==
- 1590
  - 1 February – Lawrence Humphrey, president of Magdalen College, Oxford (born 1527)
  - 12 February – Blanche Parry, personal attendant to Elizabeth I (born c. 1508)
  - 6 April – Francis Walsingham, principal secretary to Elizabeth I and spymaster (born 1530)
  - 18 November – George Talbot, 6th Earl of Shrewsbury, statesman (born 1528)
  - John Stubbs, pamphleteer (born 1543)
- 1591
  - 1 May – Elizabeth Cecil, 16th Baroness de Ros, noblewoman (born c. 1574)
  - 10 September – Richard Grenville, soldier and explorer (born 1542)
  - 20 November – Christopher Hatton, politician (born 1540)
- 1592
  - February – Thomas Cavendish, sailor and explorer (born 1555)
  - 3 September – Robert Greene, writer (born 1558)
  - 19 October – Anthony Browne, 1st Viscount Montagu, politician (born 1528)
- 1593
  - 6 April
    - Henry Barrowe, Puritan and separatist (hanged) (born c. 1550)
    - John Greenwood, Puritan and separatist (hanged) (born c. 1560)
  - 24 April – William Harrison, clergyman (born 1534)
  - 30 May – Christopher Marlowe, poet and playwright (born 1564)
  - 25 September – Henry Stanley, 4th Earl of Derby, Lord High Steward (born 1531)
- 1594
  - 7 February – Barnabe Googe, poet (born 1540)
  - 16 April – Ferdinando Stanley, 5th Earl of Derby, second in line to the throne (born 1531) (poisoned)
  - 29 April – Thomas Cooper, Bishop of Winchester, lexicographer and controversialist (born c. 1517)
  - 2 May – Edward Atslowe, physician
  - 3 June – John Aylmer, Bishop of London, constitutionalist and translator (born 1521)
  - 7 June – Roderigo Lopez, royal physician, executed (born c. 1517 in Portugal)
  - 16 July – Thomas Kyd, author of The Spanish Tragedy (born 1558)
  - 16 October – William Allen, cardinal (born 1532)
  - 22 November – Martin Frobisher, explorer (born 1535)
  - John Johnson, lutenist and composer (born c. 1545)
- 1595
  - February – William Painter, translator (born 1540)
  - 21 February – Robert Southwell, Jesuit priest, poet and martyr (born 1561)
  - 24 August – Thomas Digges, astronomer (born 1546)
  - 19 October – Philip Howard, 20th Earl of Arundel, nobleman (born 1537)
  - 12 November – John Hawkins, shipbuilder and trader (born 1532)
  - 14 December – Henry Hastings, 3rd Earl of Huntingdon (born 1535)
  - Thomas Whythorne, composer and autobiographical writer (born 1528)
- 1596
  - 27 January – Sir Francis Drake, explorer and soldier (born 1540)
  - 23 March – Henry Unton, diplomat (born 1557)
  - 23 July – Henry Carey, 1st Baron Hunsdon (born 1526)
  - 9 November (bur.) – George Peele, dramatist and poet (born 1556)
  - 10 November – Peter Wentworth, Puritan politician (born 1530)
  - 29 November
    - George Errington, Catholic martyr (year of birth unknown)
    - William Gibson, Catholic martyr (year of birth unknown)
    - William Knight, Catholic martyr (born 1572)
  - Henry Willobie, poet (born 1575)
- 1597
  - 2 February – James Burbage, actor (born 1531)
  - 6 March – William Brooke, 10th Baron Cobham, politician (born 1527)
  - 6 June – William Hunnis, poet (year of birth unknown)
  - 4 July – Henry Abbot, Catholic martyr (year of birth unknown)
  - 25 November – Edward Kelley, spirit medium (born 1555)
- 1598
  - 9 January – Jasper Heywood, Jesuit priest, classicist and translator (born 1553)
  - June – Emery Molyneux, maker of globes and scientific instruments (year of birth unknown)
  - 4 August – William Cecil, 1st Baron Burghley, statesman (born 1520)
  - 22 September – Gabriel Spenser, actor (year of birth unknown)
- 1599
  - 13 January – Edmund Spenser, poet (born 1552)
  - 14 April – Henry Wallop, statesman (born c. 1540)
  - June – Henry Porter, dramatist, murdered
  - 9 October – Reginald Scot, writer on witchcraft and politician (born c. 1538)
  - 29 November – Christopher Barker, royal printer (born c. 1529)
