= 1580s in England =

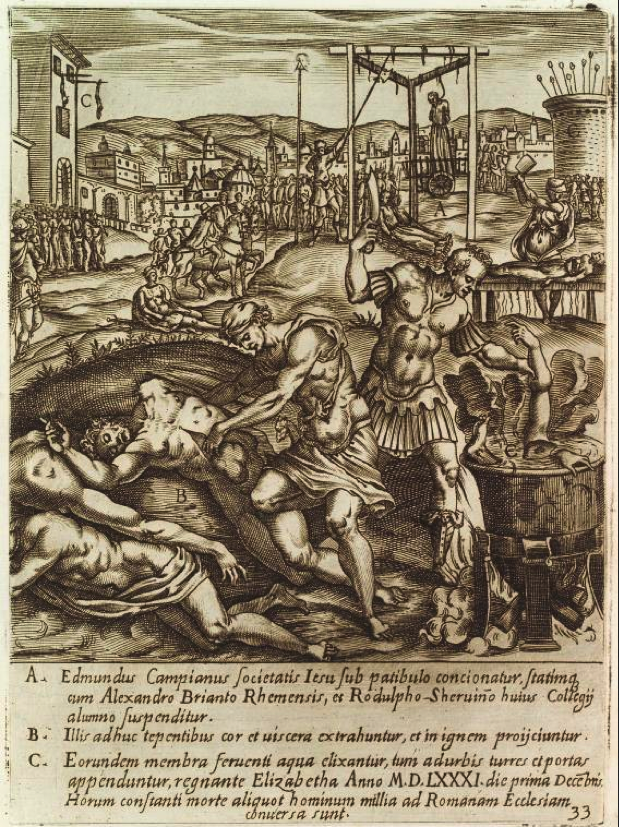
Execution of Edmund Campion, Alexander Briant and Ralph Sherwin : engraving by Giovanni Battista Cavalieri, published in Ecclesiae Anglicanae Trophaea (Rome 1584)

Events from the 1580s in England.

== Incumbents ==
- Monarch – Elizabeth I

== Events ==
- 1580
  - March – Thomas Legge's Richardus Tertius, the first known history play performed in England, is acted at St John's College, Cambridge.
  - 6 April – Dover Straits earthquake.
  - 9 April – Anglo-Spanish War: English Fury at Mechelen: English and Scottish mercenaries, assisting the Dutch Republic, storm the city of Mechelen in the Spanish Netherlands, killing 60 civilians and plundering houses and churches.
  - 21 June – England signs a commercial treaty with the Ottoman Empire.
  - 6 July – new buildings banned within three miles of the City of London.
  - 7 July – Robert Parsons and Edmund Campion begin a Jesuit mission in an attempt to restore Roman Catholicism to England, having landed the previous month.
  - 26 September – Francis Drake returns to Plymouth from his voyage of circumnavigation (westabout) on the Golden Hind, the first made by an Englishman.
  - First recorded appearance of the ballad Greensleeves.
- 1581
  - 18 March – Act against Reconciliation to Rome establishes heavy fines for recusancy or attending Catholic Mass.
  - 4 April – Drake knighted by Queen Elizabeth I aboard the Golden Hind at Deptford.
  - 14 July – Jesuit priest Edmund Campion is arrested at Lyford, Berkshire.
  - 1 December – Edmund Campion is hanged, drawn and quartered for treason with two other priests at Tyburn.
- 1582
  - May–August – Robert Browne and his Brownist congregationalist companions are obliged to leave England and go to Middelburg in the Netherlands.
  - 26 July – Battle of Ponta Delgada (Anglo-Spanish War): English mercenary galleons are among the fleet decisively defeated by the Spanish in the Azores.
  - 29 November – marriage of William Shakespeare and Anne Hathaway, perhaps at Temple Grafton.
  - Publication of Richard Hakluyt's Divers Voyages Touching the Discoverie of America.
  - Publication of the first part of Richard Mulcaster's textbook on the teaching of English, the Elementarie.
- 1583
  - 10 March – Queen Elizabeth's Men acting company founded.
  - 19 April – Queen Elizabeth dissolves her 4th Parliament which had been convened in 1572 but last met in 1581.
  - 23 April – the Kingdom of England establishes diplomatic relations with the Ottoman Empire.
  - 11 June – Sir Humphrey Gilbert sails from Dartmouth, Devon, to establish a colony in North America.
  - 17 June – Anglo-Spanish War: Battle of Steenbergen in the Netherlands: the Spanish Army of Flanders is victorious over combined French, English and Dutch forces.
  - 18 June – the first known life insurance policy is issued in London.
  - 5 August – Humphrey Gilbert, in what is to become the city of St. John's, claims the island of Newfoundland on behalf of England. Ships of his fleet are wrecked, and Gilbert drowns, on the return passage of the Atlantic.
  - 14 August – John Whitgift nominated as Archbishop of Canterbury (enthroned 23 October).
  - 4 November – Francis Throckmorton's plot to invade England with the assistance of Henry I, Duke of Guise, and replace Elizabeth with Mary, Queen of Scots, is discovered by Francis Walsingham and Throckmorton is arrested for treason.
  - 10 December – great fire of Nantwich in Cheshire breaks out.
  - Posthumous publication of Thomas Smith's treatise De Republica Anglorum: the Maner of Gouernement or Policie of the Realme of England (written 1562–65).
  - Publication of Philip Stubbs' tract The Anatomie of Abuses.
  - The Bunch of Grapes, Limehouse opens as a public house in London.
- 1584
  - 11 January – Sir Walter Mildmay is granted a royal licence to found Emmanuel College, Cambridge.
  - 12 February – George Haydock and four other Roman Catholic priests are hanged, drawn and quartered at Tyburn in London.
  - Easter term – the landmark decision in Heydon's Case introduces the mischief rule into the interpretation of statutes by the courts.
  - 4 June – Walter Ralegh sends Philip Amadas and Arthur Barlowe to explore the Outer Banks of Virginia (modern-day North Carolina), with a view to establishing an English colony; they locate Roanoke Island.
  - 10 July – execution of Francis Throckmorton.
  - 19 October – the Bond of Association is drawn up, in response to the scares caused by the Throckmorton Plot and the assassination of William the Silent in the Netherlands. The thousands who sign it (including Mary, Queen of Scots) will pledge to execute anyone who attempts or succeeds in usurping or killing the Queen.
  - 23 November – Queen Elizabeth convenes the first new session of the English House of Commons since 1581. John Puckering is appointed by her as the Speaker of the House, which has 460 members.
  - December – Parliament passes legislation to ban Jesuits and seminary priests from the country.
  - Publication of the cookbook The Boke of Cokery.
- 1585
  - 6 January – Walter Ralegh is knighted.
  - 21 January – Robert Nutter, Thomas Worthington and 18 other Roman Catholic priests are perpetually banished from England by order of Queen Elizabeth, placed on the ship Mary Martin of Colchester and transported to France.
  - 2 March – William Parry executed for plotting Queen Elizabeth's murder.
  - March – Parliament passes the Safety of the Queen, etc. Act, requiring a tribunal to investigate "any open invasion or rebellion" in England.
  - 19 May – Spain seizes English ships in Spanish ports.
  - 7 July – England establishes the Roanoke Colony in North America.
  - 8 August – explorer John Davis (having set out on 7 June from Dartmouth) enters Cumberland Sound in Baffin Island in his quest for the Northwest Passage.
  - 14 August – Queen Elizabeth establishes a protectorate over the Netherlands.
  - 20 August – the Treaty of Nonsuch is signed, committing England to support for the Dutch Revolt against Habsburg rule.
  - 14 September – Queen Elizabeth gives assent to the Jesuits, etc. Act, which gives Jesuits, seminary priests "and such other like disobedient persons" 40 days to leave the country. Anyone harbouring or failing to disclose knowledge of a priest is subject to imprisonment or execution.
  - 15 September – John Adams and 72 other Catholic priests are banished from England and transported by ship to Boulogne in France.
- 1586
  - 4 February – Robert Dudley, 1st Earl of Leicester accepts the title governor of the Netherlands.
  - 11 February – Battle of Cartagena de Indias concludes after 2 days with an English assault force led by Francis Drake capturing the port of Cartagena in the Spanish Viceroyalty of Peru.
  - 14 March – Black Assize of Exeter opens: "gaol fever" (jail fever, probably epidemic typhus), spreading from Rougemont Castle in Exeter, kills 8 judges, 11 of 12 jurors, and ravages the surrounding population for several months; many prominent members of the Devonshire gentry are among the dead.
  - 25 March – Catholic convert Margaret Clitherow of York is tortured and crushed to death by peine forte et dure for refusing to plead to a charge of harbouring priests; in 1970 she will be canonized as one of the Forty Martyrs of England and Wales.
  - 7 May – John Davis sets out from Dartmouth, Devon, for a second attempt to find the Northwest Passage.
  - 6 July – Treaty of Berwick agreed between Queen Elizabeth I of England and King James VI of Scotland.
  - 17 July – Walsingham uncovers the Babington Plot to murder Elizabeth.
  - 21 July – Thomas Cavendish sets out from Plymouth in the Desire on the first deliberately planned circumnavigation of the globe.
  - 22 July – Sir Francis Drake and his crew return to England, arriving at Portsmouth to heroes' welcome.
  - 28 July – Thomas Harriot returns from a voyage to Colombia with the first potatoes seen in England.
  - 20–21 September – execution of Anthony Babington, John Ballard, Chidiock Tichborne, Thomas Salisbury and the other 10 conspirators in the Babington Plot, who are hanged, drawn and quartered (the first seven being disembowelled before death) in St Giles Field, London.
  - 22 September – Battle of Zutphen: Spanish troops defeat Dutch rebels and their English allies. Poet and courtier Sir Philip Sidney is mortally wounded and dies on 17 October.
  - 15–25 October – Mary, Queen of Scots, placed on treason trial at Fotheringhay Castle for complicity in the Babington Plot and sentenced to death.
  - 19 November – Separatist Puritan Henry Barrowe is imprisoned.
  - Great fire of Beccles.
  - Vanguard, the first Royal Navy ship to bear this name, is launched at Woolwich Dockyard.
  - Topographer William Harrison becomes canon of Windsor.
  - William Camden publishes his pioneering antiquarian study Britannia.
  - William Warner first publishes his long historical poem Albion's England.
  - Oxford University Press is recognised by decree of the Star Chamber.
  - From about this date an informal College or Society of Antiquaries begins to meet.
- 1587
  - 8 February – Mary, Queen of Scots, is beheaded at Fotheringay Castle.
  - 1 March – Sir Anthony Cope and Sir Peter Wentworth are imprisoned for attempting to bring forward Parliamentary legislation interfering with the Queen's ecclesiastical prerogative.
  - 15 March – Sir Francis Drake accepts a privateering commission from Queen Elizabeth to disrupt shipping routes in order to slow supplies from Italy and Andalucia to Lisbon, to trouble enemy fleets in their home ports, to capture Spanish treasure ships and to attack the Spanish Armada if it were to sail for England. On 12 April, his fleet sails from Plymouth.
  - 19 April (29 April New Style) – "Singeing the King of Spain's Beard": On an expedition against Spain, Sir Francis Drake leads a raid in the Bay of Cádiz, sinking or capturing at least 30 ships of the Spanish fleet, delaying by a year the sailing of the Spanish Armada for England.
  - 19 May – John Davis sets out from Dartmouth, Devon, for a third attempt to find the Northwest Passage.
  - 8 June – Sir Francis Drake captures Portuguese carrack the São Filipe, laden with treasure from the Indies, off the Azores. Its cargo is valued at £108,000 (equivalent to £31,160,465 in 2025), of which 50% goes to Queen Elizabeth and 10% to Drake; it also includes valuable documents relating to the Indies trade.
  - 22 July – Roanoke Colony: A group of English settlers arrive on Roanoke Island off North Carolina to re-establish the deserted colony.
  - 21 December – Lord Howard of Effingham given command of both army and navy in the war against Spain.
  - Late (probable date) – the first part of Christopher Marlowe's drama Tamburlaine the Great is performed in London by the Admiral's Men with Edward Alleyn playing the lead.
  - The Rose (theatre), the first on Bankside in London, is built by Philip Henslowe and functioning by the year's end.
  - Everard Digby's De Arte Natandi, the first treatise on swimming in England, is published.
  - The doctrine Cuius est solum, eius est usque ad coelum et ad inferos is established in common law by Edward Coke.
- 1588
  - 1 January – the Children of Paul's act at the court of Queen Elizabeth, probably performing John Lyly's Gallathea.
  - 18–20 May (28–30 May NS) – the Spanish Armada sets sail from the Tagus estuary for an attempted invasion of England.
  - 19 July (29 July NS) – the Armada is sighted off The Lizard in Cornwall; the news is relayed to London via a series of beacons built along the south coast.
  - 21 July (31 July NS) – the first engagement between the English and Spanish fleets, off Plymouth, results in an English victory. The English fleet is under the command of Lord Howard of Effingham with Sir Francis Drake as Vice Admiral.
  - 23 July (2 August NS) – the English and Spanish fleets meet again, off Portland; the English again have the better of it.
  - 28 July (7 August NS) – the English send fire ships into the French fleet, now anchored off Calais, breaking their formation.
  - 29 July (8 August NS) – the English fleet defeats the Armada at the Battle of Gravelines.
  - 2 August (12 August NS) – the fleeing Spanish fleet sails past the Firth of Forth and the English call off their pursuit. Much of the Spanish fleet will be destroyed by storms as it sails for home around Scotland and the west coast of Ireland.
  - 9 August – Queen Elizabeth makes her speech to the Troops at Tilbury.
  - 1 October – Oaten Hill Martyrs: four Catholics are hanged, drawn and quartered at Canterbury.
  - October–November – the Marprelate Controversy, a war of pamphlets between Presbyterians and supporters of the established church, breaks out with publication of the Epistle by "Martin Marprelate" on Robert Waldegrave's secret press at Molesey and Fawsley.
  - George Gower paints the Armada Portrait of Queen Elizabeth.
  - Nicholas Hilliard paints the portrait miniature Young Man Among Roses.
  - First record of marbles being played at Tinsley Green, West Sussex.
  - 1588–1589 – earliest probable date for the composition and first performance of Christopher Marlowe's The Tragicall History of the Life and Death of Doctor Faustus in London.
- 1589
  - 13 April – an English Armada led by Sir Francis Drake and Sir John Norreys and largely financed by private investors sets sail to attack the Iberian Peninsula's Atlantic coast but fails to achieve any naval advantage.
  - Publication of Richard Hakluyt's The Principal Navigations, Voiages, Traffiques and Discoueries of the English Nation begins.

== Births ==
- 1580
  - February – John Digby, 1st Earl of Bristol, diplomat (died 1653)
  - 8 April – William Herbert, 3rd Earl of Pembroke, courtier (died 1630)
  - 15 April – George Calvert, 1st Baron Baltimore, politician and colonizer (died 1623)
  - 18 April (baptism) – Thomas Middleton, playwright (died 1627)
  - 24 August – John Taylor, poet (died 1654)
  - 4 December – Samuel Argall, adventurer and naval officer (died 1626)
  - Edward Fairfax, translator (died 1635)
- 1581
  - Edmund Gunter, mathematician (died 1621)
  - Thomas Overbury, poet and essayist (murdered 1613)
- 1582
  - 8 April (baptism) – Phineas Fletcher, poet (died 1650)
  - 28 May – William Fiennes, 1st Viscount Saye and Sele, statesman (died 1662)
  - John Bainbridge, astronomer (died 1648)
  - Richard Corbet, poet (died 1635)
  - William Juxon, Archbishop of Canterbury (died 1663)
  - Thomas Moulson, Lord Mayor of London (died 1638)
  - Francis Windebank, politician (died 1646)
- 1583
  - 3 March – Edward Herbert, 1st Baron Herbert of Cherbury, diplomat, poet and philosopher (died 1648)
  - November – Philip Massinger, dramatist (died 1640)
  - 17 December – Robert Bertie, 1st Earl of Lindsey, adventurer and soldier (killed in battle 1642)
  - 25 December – Orlando Gibbons, composer (died 1625)
  - Approximate date
    - John Beaumont, poet (died 1627)
    - Aurelian Townshend, poet (died 1643)
- 1584
  - 29 March – Ferdinando Fairfax, 2nd Lord Fairfax of Cameron, parliamentary general (died 1648)
  - 19 April – John Hales, theologian (died 1656)
  - 20 May – John Pym, parliamentarian (died 1643)
  - 6 August – Robert Pierrepont, 1st Earl of Kingston-upon-Hull (died 1643)
  - 13 August – Theophilus Howard, 2nd Earl of Suffolk, politician (died 1640)
  - 16 December – John Selden, jurist (died 1654)
  - 21 December (baptism) – Thomas Weston, merchant adventurer (died c. 1647)
  - Francis Beaumont, dramatist (died 1616)
  - Approximate date
    - William Baffin, explorer (died 1622)
    - Mary Frith, cutpurse (died 1659)
    - Myles Standish, military officer and colonist (died 1656)
- 1585
  - 23 January – Mary Ward, nun (died 1645)
  - Early October – John Ball, puritan divine (died 1640)
  - 4 December – John Cotton, theologian and minister in the Massachusetts Bay colony (died 1652)
  - Ambrose Barlow, Catholic priest (martyred 1641)
  - Elizabeth Cary, Lady Falkland, née Elizabeth Tanfield, poet, translator and dramatist (died 1639)
  - John Danvers, politician (died 1655)
- 1586
  - 12 April (baptism) – John Ford, dramatist and poet (died c. 1639)
  - 7 July – Thomas Howard, 21st Earl of Arundel, courtier (died 1646)
  - 14 August – William Hutchinson, founder of Rhode Island (died 1642)
  - 11 December (baptism) – John Mason, explorer (died 1635)
  - Approximate date – Giles Fletcher, poet (died 1623)
- 1587
  - 5 June – Robert Rich, 2nd Earl of Warwick, colonial administrator and admiral (died 1658)
  - July – George Yeardley, colonial administrator in America (died 1627)
  - 18 August – Virginia Dare, first child born in the New World (Roanoke Colony) to English parents
  - 19 September – Robert Sanderson, Bishop of Lincoln, theologian (died 1663)
  - 17 October – Nathan Field, dramatist and actor (died 1620)
  - 18 October – Lady Mary Wroth, poet (died 1651/3)
  - William Feilding, 1st Earl of Denbigh (died 1643)
  - Francis Kynaston, courtier and poet (died 1642)
- 1588
  - 5 April – Thomas Hobbes, philosopher (died 1679)
  - 26 May (baptism) – Accepted Frewen, Archbishop of York (died 1664)
  - 11 June – George Wither, poet and satirist (died 1667)
  - 10 September (baptism) – Nicholas Lanier, composer and musician (died 1666)
  - Robert Filmer, political writer (died 1653)

== Deaths ==
- 1580
  - 24 February – Henry FitzAlan, 19th Earl of Arundel, nobleman (born 1511)
  - 3 May – Thomas Tusser, poet and farmer (born 1524)
  - 30 November – Richard Farrant, composer (born 1530)
  - John Heywood, dramatist (born 1497)
- 1581
  - 22 July – Richard Cox, bishop (born 1500)
  - 1 December
    - Edmund Campion, Jesuit (executed) (born 1540)
    - Alexander Briant, Jesuit priest (executed) (born 1556)
    - Ralph Sherwin, Catholic priest (executed) (born 1550)
  - Nicholas Sanders, Catholic priest and historian (born 1530)
- 1583
  - 9 June – Thomas Radclyffe, 3rd Earl of Sussex, Lord-Lieutenant of Ireland (born 1525)
  - 6 July – Edmund Grindal, Archbishop of Canterbury (born 1519)
  - 9 September – Humphrey Gilbert, English explorer (wreck of the Squirrel) (born c. 1537)
- 1584
  - 12 February – George Haydock, Catholic priest (executed) (born c. 1556)
  - 10 March – Thomas Norton, politician and writer (born 1532)
  - 10 July – Francis Throckmorton, conspirator against Queen Elizabeth I (executed) (born 1554)
  - 12 July – Steven Borough, explorer (born 1525)
  - 23 July – John Day, Protestant printer (born 1522)
- 1585
  - January – Anthony Gilby, Puritan and Bible translator (born c. 1510)
  - 16 January – Edward Fiennes Clinton, admiral (born 1512)
  - 6 February – Edmund Plowden, legal scholar (born 1518)
  - 3 April – Thomas Goldwell, ecclesiastic
  - 21 June – Henry Percy, 8th Earl of Northumberland, nobleman and conspirator (suicide) (born 1532)
  - 6 July – Thomas Aufield, Catholic priest (executed) (born 1552)
  - 28 July – Francis Russell, 2nd Earl of Bedford, nobleman, soldier and politician (born 1527)
  - 23 November – Thomas Tallis, English composer (born c. 1510)
- 1586
  - 24 March – Margaret Clitherow, Catholic saint and martyr (born 1556)
  - 5 May – Henry Sidney, Lord Deputy of Ireland (born 1529)
  - 12 July – Edward Sutton, 4th Baron Dudley (born c. 1515)
  - 20 September
    - Sir Anthony Babington, Catholic conspirator (executed) (born 1561)
    - Chidiock Tichborne, conspirator and poet (executed) (born 1558)
  - 17 October – Sir Philip Sidney, poet, courtier and soldier (died of wounds) (born 1554)
- 1587
  - January – Thomas Seckford, official (born 1515)
  - 30 March – Ralph Sadler, statesman (born 1507)
  - 8 April – John Foxe, author (born 1516)
  - 14 April – Edward Manners, 3rd Earl of Rutland (born 1549)
  - 16 April – Anne Stanhope, Duchess of Somerset (born 1497)
  - September – George Whetstone, writer (duel) (born 1544)
  - Dudley Fenner, puritan divine (born c. 1558)
- 1588
  - 18 June – Robert Crowley, London stationer (born 1517)
  - 10 July – Edwin Sandys, Archbishop of York (born 1519)
  - 30 August – Margaret Ward, Catholic martyr and saint (year of birth unknown)
  - 3 September – Richard Tarlton, actor (born 1530)
  - 4 September – Robert Dudley, 1st Earl of Leicester, politician (born 1532)
  - 1 October – Edward James, Catholic priest (executed at Chichester) (born c. 1557)
  - Approximate date – Roger Dudley, soldier (born between 1535 and 1545)
- 1589
  - 21 February – Ambrose Dudley, 3rd Earl of Warwick (born c. 1528)
  - 2 April – Raleigh, Native American captive in the household of Richard Grenville
