= 1724 in Great Britain =

The following events occurred in Great Britain in the year 1724.

== Incumbents ==
- Monarch – George I
- Prime Minister – Robert Walpole (Whig)

== Events ==
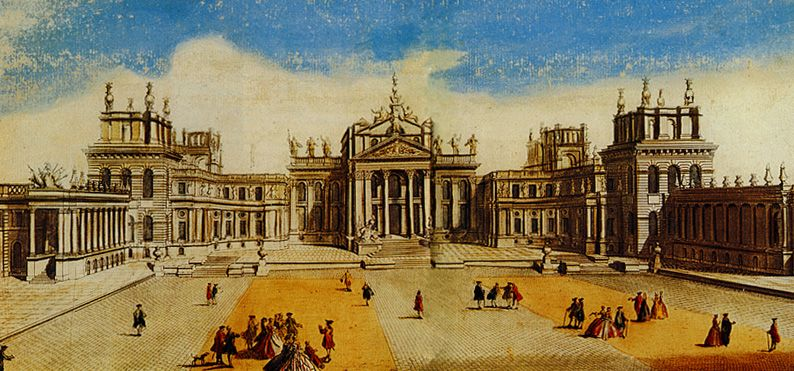
Blenheim Palace completed.

- 20 February – Giulio Cesare in Egitto, an Italian opera by George Frideric Handel, is premiered in London.
- 6 April – Thomas Pelham-Holles, 1st Duke of Newcastle-upon-Tyne becomes Secretary of State for the Southern Department; Henry Pelham becomes Secretary at War.
- August – Longman, the oldest surviving publishing house in England, is founded in London by Thomas Longman.
- 31 October – Handel's opera Tamerlano is premiered in London
- 16 November – Thief Jack Sheppard is hanged in London. (His partner-in-crime, highwayman Joseph Blake, alias "Blueskin", was similarly executed five days earlier.)
- Undated – Blenheim Palace construction is completed. It has been built as a gift from the nation to the Duke of Marlborough (died 1722) for his involvement in the Battle of Blenheim in 1704.

== Publications ==
- Daniel Defoe's A tour thro' the whole island of Great Britain begins publication.
- Jonathan Swift's Drapier's Letters begin publication.
- Isaac Watts' textbook Logic.

== Births ==
- 24 January – Frances Brooke, writer (died 1789)
- 28 February – George Townshend, 1st Marquess Townshend, field marshal (died 1807)
- 19 May – Augustus Hervey, 3rd Earl of Bristol, admiral and politician (died 1779)
- 3 June – John Gregory, physician, medical writer and moralist (died 1773)
- 8 June – John Smeaton, civil engineer (died 1792)
- 25 August – George Stubbs, painter (died 1806)
- 3 September – Guy Carleton, 1st Baron Dorchester, soldier and Governor of Quebec (died 1808)
- 31 October – Christopher Anstey, writer (died 1805)
- 12 December – Samuel Hood, 1st Viscount Hood, admiral (died 1816)
- 25 December – John Michell, scientist and geologist (died 1793)

== Deaths ==
- 1 January – Charles Gildon, critic and dramatist (born c. 1665)
- 12 February – Elkanah Settle, writer (born 1648)
- 21 May – Robert Harley, 1st Earl of Oxford and Mortimer, statesman (born 1661)
- 15 June – Henry Sacheverell, churchman and politician (born 1674)
- 29 October – William Wollaston, philosophical writer (born 1659)
- 11 November – Joseph Blake (alias Blueskin), highwayman (executed) (born 1700)
- 16 November – Jack Sheppard, criminal (executed) (born 1702)
- 29 November – Laurence Braddon, writer and politician (year of birth not known)
- 27 December – Thomas Guy, philanthropist (born 1644)

== See also ==
- 1724 in Wales
