= 1654 in England =

- Centuries: 15th; 16th; 17th; 18th; 19th
- Decades: 1630s; 1640s; 1650s; 1660s; 1670s
- See also: Other events of 1654

Events from the year 1654 in England.

== Incumbents ==
- Lord Protector – Oliver Cromwell

== Events ==
- 20 March – establishment of Commission of Triers which will fill empty Anglican benefices with Puritan ministers.
- 5 April – signing of the Treaty of Westminster ends the First Anglo-Dutch War, and the Dutch agree to observe the Navigation Acts.
- 11 April – Anglo-Swedish alliance: A commercial treaty between England and Sweden is signed.
- 12 April – Oliver Cromwell creates a union between England and Scotland, with Scottish representation in the Parliament of England.
- 10 July – Peter Vowell and John Gerard are executed in London for plotting to assassinate Cromwell.
- August – Cromwell launches the 'Western Design', an expedition to the Caribbean to counter Spanish commercial interests, effectively beginning the Anglo-Spanish War (which will last until after the Restoration in 1660). The main fleet leaves Portsmouth on 25 December.
- 3 September – First Protectorate Parliament assembles.

== Births ==
- 10 January – Joshua Barnes, scholar (died 1712)
- 22 January – Richard Blackmore, physician and writer (died 1729)
- 22 February – Elizabeth Monck, Duchess of Albemarle (died 1734)
- 27 April – Charles Blount, deist (died 1693)
- 23 June – Richard Onslow, 1st Baron Onslow, politician (died 1717)
- John Bellers, educationist (died 1725)

== Deaths ==
- 10 January – Nicholas Culpeper, astrologer (born 1616)
- 8 February – John Talbot, 10th Earl of Shrewsbury (born 1601)
- 19 February – Edmund Chilmead, writer (born 1610)
- 3 June – Alethea Howard, Countess of Arundel (born 1585)
- 27 June– Thomas Gataker, clergy (born 1574)
- 28 June – John Southworth, martyr (born 1592)
- 10 July – Peter Vowell, Royalist conspirator (year of birth unknown)
- August – Roger Dodsworth, antiquary (born 1585)
- 30 November
  - William Habington, poet (born 1605)
  - John Selden, lawyer (born 1584)
- 6 December (bur.) – Sir William Brockman, military leader and politician (born 1595)
