= 1651 in England =

- Centuries: 15th; 16th; 17th; 18th; 19th
- Decades: 1630s; 1640s; 1650s; 1660s; 1670s
- See also: Other events of 1651

Events from the year 1651 in England, third and final year of the Third English Civil War and final year of the Wars of the Three Kingdoms.

== Events ==
- 1 January – Charles II is crowned King of Scotland at Scone.
- 3 February – Muggletonianism inaugurated.
- 14 February–18 June – a diplomatic team headed by Oliver St John and Walter Strickland is sent to The Hague to negotiate an alliance between the English Commonwealth and the Dutch Republic, in which they are unsuccessful.
- 30 March – supposed commencement of Three Hundred and Thirty Five Years' War between the Dutch Republic and Royalist forces in the Isles of Scilly.
- 17 April – English Civil War: Robert Blake's forces attack Tresco, opening a siege of the Isles of Scilly.
- 23 May – English Civil War: Blake takes the surrender of the Isles of Scilly, the last outpost of the Royalist navy.
- 20 July – English Civil War: at the Battle of Inverkeithing in Scotland, the English Parliament's New Model Army defeats a Scottish army loyal to Charles II.
- 25 August – English Civil War: At the Battle of Wigan Lane Royalist troops under James Stanley, 7th Earl of Derby are defeated by the New Model Army under Robert Lilburne.
- 3 September – English Civil War: Battle of Worcester – Charles II, leading a largely Scottish army, is defeated in the last main battle of the war and begins his escape northwards.
- 6 September – Charles II hides from pursuing Parliamentarian troops in the Royal Oak tree at Boscobel House in Shropshire.
- 15–16 October – Escape of Charles II to Fécamp in France from Shoreham in the coal boat Surprise.
- 28 October – Tender of Union: Parliament issues a declaration that England and Scotland should be incorporated into a single commonwealth.
- December – the Fifth Monarchists emerge as a separate sect when a group of preachers including Christopher Feake, John Rogers and John Simpson meet in London and, disillusioned by the apparent failure of Parliament to further the "Godly Revolution", agree a programme of action to support their objectives, including active resistance to the government.

=== Undated ===
- First coffee house in England opens, in Oxford.
- William Harvey describes organ formation in the developing embryo in De Generatione.
- William Gilbert's A New Philosophy of Our Sublunar World is published posthumously. It theorises that the fixed stars are not all the same distance from Earth, and that the force of magnetism holds the planets in orbit around the Sun.
- Cornelius Vermuyden constructs the first Denver Sluice, an important component in drainage of The Fens.

== Publications ==
- William Davenant's epic poem Gondibert, published with an introduction by Thomas Hobbes.
- Thomas Hobbes' major political work Leviathan.
- John Playford's important collection of country dance tunes The English Dancing Master.

== Births ==
- 3 January – Henry Booth, 1st Earl of Warrington, politician (died 1694)
- 20 January – Edward Tyson, comparative anatomist (died 1708)
- 11 February – Sir Ralph Assheton, 2nd Baronet, of Middleton, politician (died 1716)
- 4 March – John Somers, 1st Baron Somers, Lord Chancellor of England (died 1716)
- August – William Dampier, buccaneer, sea captain, author and scientific observer (died 1715)

== Deaths ==
- 8 February – Richard Newport, 1st Baron Newport, politician (born 1587)
- 10 April – Sir William Armine, 1st Baronet, politician (born 1593)
- 28 May – Henry Grey, 10th Earl of Kent, politician (born 1594)
- 17 June – Roger North, politician (born 1577)
- 3 September – William Widdrington, 1st Baron Widdrington, landowner and politician, killed in battle (born 1610)
- 5 October – James Stanley, 7th Earl of Derby, Royalist, beheaded (born 1607)
- 26 November – Henry Ireton, Civil War leader, of plague (born 1611)
