= 1660 in England =

- Centuries: 15th; 16th; 17th; 18th; 19th
- Decades: 1640s; 1650s; 1660s; 1670s; 1680s
- See also: Other events of 1660

Events from the year 1660 in England. This is the year of the Stuart Restoration.

== Incumbents ==
- Monarch – Charles II (starting 29 May)

== Events ==
- 1 January
  - Colonel George Monck with his regiment crosses from Scotland to England at the village of Coldstream and advances towards London in support of Parliament.
  - Samuel Pepys begins his diary.
- 3 February – George Monck and his regiment arrive in London.
- 11 February – Monck demands reinstatement of the Long Parliament.
- 21 February – Presbyterian Members of Parliament expelled by "Pride's Purge" in 1648 are readmitted, reinstating the Long Parliament.
- 27 February – John Thurloe is reinstated as England's Secretary of State for a short time.
- February – John Rhodes reopens the old Cockpit Theatre in London, forms a company of young actors and begins to stage plays. His production of Pericles will be the first Shakespearean performance of the Restoration era; Thomas Betterton makes his stage debut in the title role.
- 16 March – the Long Parliament (first elected in 1640) votes to dissolve itself, calling for a free general election.
- 4 April – Declaration of Breda issued by the exiled Charles II promises amnesty, freedom of conscience and army back pay in return for the Restoration of the Crown.
- 22 April – General John Lambert, having escaped from imprisonment in the Tower of London and attempted to rekindle the Civil War in favour of the Commonwealth by issuing a proclamation calling on all supporters of the "Good Old Cause" to rally on the battlefield of Edgehill, is recaptured at Daventry by Colonel Richard Ingoldsby.
- 25 April – first meeting of the Convention Parliament, newly elected as a "free parliament", i.e. with no oath of allegiance to the Commonwealth or to the monarchy, but predominantly Royalist and Presbyterian in its membership, with only 16 members of the former Rump re-elected. The House of Lords reconvenes for the first time since its abolition in 1649.
- 1 May – the Declaration of Breda is presented to the Parliament of England which acknowledges that the lawful government of the nation is by King, Lords and Commons.
- 8 May – Parliament declares that Charles has been lawful King of England since 1649 and invites him to return.
- 15 May – John Thurloe is arrested for high treason.
- 19 May – the newly restored Church of England Convocation of the English Clergy canonises King Charles I as King Charles the Martyr and Saint Charles Stuart, the only saint formally canonised within the Anglican Communion.
- 23 May (2 June N.S.) – Charles II embarks from Scheveningen on HMS Royal Charles (1660), captained by Edward Montagu (created Earl of Sandwich two months later).
- 25 May – Charles II lands on Dover beach and is met by Monck.
- 29 May – Charles II arrives in London and assumes the throne, marking the beginning of the English Restoration, commemorated as Oak Apple Day.
- 25 June – General Post Office established by Charles II.
- 29 June – John Thurloe is released.
- 27 July – Regicides William Goffe and Edward Whalley, fleeing the country, arrive in Massachusetts.
- 2 August – Charles II issues a grant for two theatre companies: a King's Company under his own patronage, led by Thomas Killigrew, and a Duke's Company under the patronage of his brother, the Duke of York, led by Sir William Davenant.
- 27 August – the books of John Milton are burnt because of his attacks on King Charles II.
- 29 August – Indemnity and Oblivion Act passes into law, granting indemnities to those who had been active in the Interregnum (other than regicides).
- September – William Juxon appointed as Archbishop of Canterbury.
- 3 September – in a ceremony starting at 11pm, James, Duke of York, the King's brother and heir, and Anne Hyde are privately married at her father's London home. Their first child is born 2 months later.
- 25 September – one of the earliest references to tea in England appears in Samuel Pepys's diary.
- 13 October – the first of ten regicides of Charles I to be executed this year is hanged, drawn and quartered.
- 25 October – King Charles proposes that some Presbyterian ministers become bishops to heal rifts in the Church; the plan is later abandoned.
- 11 November – imprisonment of John Bunyan in Bedford Gaol for preaching without a licence.
- 19 November – James, Duke of York, as Lord High Admiral of England, proclaims that use of the newly restored Union Jack is reserved to ships of the Royal Navy and merchant ships should fly the Red Ensign.
- 28 November – at Gresham College, twelve men, including Christopher Wren, Robert Boyle, John Wilkins, and Robert Moray, meet after a lecture by Wren and decide to found "a College for the Promoting of Physico-Mathematicall Experimentall Learning" (later known as the Royal Society).
- 8 December – first English actress to appear on the professional stage in a non-singing role, as Desdemona in Othello; variously considered to be Margaret Hughes, Anne Marshall or Katherine Corey.
- 18 December – the Company of Royal Adventurers Trading to Africa is chartered; it will come to have a monopoly over the English slave trade. It is led by Duke of York.
- 24 December – Tenures Abolition Act changes several types of feudal land tenure in England.

=== Publications ===
- Robert Boyle's landmark book New Experiments Physico-Mechanicall, Touching the Spring of the Air and its Effects. The second edition in 1662 will contain Boyle's law.
- John Milton's anti-monarchic tract The Ready and Easy Way to Establish a Free Commonwealth (editions in February and March).

== Births ==
- 16 April – Hans Sloane, physician, in Ireland (died 1753)
- By May – Anne Killigrew, poet and painter (died 1685)
- 28 May – King George I of Great Britain, in Hanover (died 1727)
- 29 May – Sarah Churchill, Duchess of Marlborough, friend of Queen Anne (died 1744)
- 24 July – Charles Talbot, 1st Duke of Shrewsbury, politician (died 1718)
- ca. September – Daniel Defoe, writer (died 1731)
- 20 October – Robert Bertie, 1st Duke of Ancaster and Kesteven, statesman (died 1723)

== Deaths ==
- ca. 20 February – Philip Skippon, Parliamentarian Sergeant-Major-General (born c. 1600)
- 25 April – Henry Hammond, Royalist canon and scholar, of the stone (born 1605)
- 1 June – Mary Dyer, Quaker, hanged in Boston, Massachusetts (born c. 1611)
- 30 June – William Oughtred, mathematician (born 1574)
- 18 September – Henry Stuart, Duke of Gloucester, member of the royal family, of smallpox (born 1639)
- 13 October – Thomas Harrison, Parliamentarian Major-General, regicide, hanged (born 1616)
- 15 October – John Carew, Parliamentarian, regicide, hanged (born 1622)
- 17 October – Parliamentarian regicides, hanged
  - Gregory Clement, merchant and MP (born 1594)
  - John Jones Maesygarnedd, Welsh colonel (born ca. 1597)
  - Thomas Scot, MP
  - Adrian Scrope, colonel (born 1601)
- 5 November – Lucy Hay, Countess of Carlisle, socialite (born 1599)
- 24 December – Mary, Princess Royal and Princess of Orange, of smallpox (born 1631)
