= Act prohibiting the proclaiming any person to be King of England or Ireland, or the Dominions thereof =

United Kingdom legislation

"An Act prohibiting the proclaiming any person to be King of England or Ireland, or the Dominions thereof" purported to be an act of the Parliament of England, enacted without royal assent on the same day as the execution of King Charles I of England on 30 January 1649, during the English Civil War.

The purpose of the act was to prevent the automatic succession of Charles's son as king, or the proclamation of another person as king. The monarchy was abolished shortly afterwards on 17 March 1649. Following the Restoration the act was declared void because it had not received royal assent.
