= 1652 in England =

- Centuries: 15th; 16th; 17th; 18th; 19th
- Decades: 1630s; 1640s; 1650s; 1660s; 1670s
- See also: Other events of 1652

Events from the year 1652 in England.

== Events ==
- 10 April – Prudence Lee becomes the last woman in England burned alive at the stake for mariticide, at Smithfield, London (subsequent recipients of the sentence being in practice strangled before burning).
- 19 May – First Anglo-Dutch War: Battle of Dover fought inconclusively off Dover between Lt.-Admiral Maarten Harpertszoon Tromp's 42 Dutch ships and 21 English ships divided into two squadrons, one commanded by Robert Blake and the other by Nehemiah Bourne.
- 13 June – George Fox preaches to a large crowd on Firbank Fell in Westmorland, leading to the establishment of the Religious Society of Friends (Quakers).
- 30 June – First Anglo-Dutch War: Britain formally declares war on the Dutch Republic (United Provinces of the Netherlands).
- 26 August – First Anglo-Dutch War: An English fleet attacks an outward-bound Dutch convoy of the escorted by 23 men-of-war and six fire ships commanded by Vice-Commodore Michiel de Ruyter at the Battle of Plymouth; the Dutch escape.
- 6 September – First Anglo-Dutch War: Battle of Elba, a Dutch naval victory.
- 8 October – First Anglo-Dutch War: Battle of the Kentish Knock fought in the North Sea about 30 km from the mouth of the river Thames; the Dutch are forced to withdraw.
- 30 November – First Anglo-Dutch War: English under Blake defeated by Dutch under Tromp at the Battle of Dungeness.
- Royal Navy Dockyard established at Harwich.
- Probable date – second coffeehouse in England opened, in London, by Pasqua Rosée.

== Publications ==
- Thomas Nicols' Lapidary, or, the history of pretious stones, the first work in English on gemstones.

== Births ==
- 2 January – Sir Gilbert Heathcote, 1st Baronet, Lord Mayor of London (died 1733)
- 13 January – Henry Booth, 1st Earl of Warrington, politician (died 1694)
- 16 January – Anthony Ashley-Cooper, 2nd Earl of Shaftesbury, politician (died 1699)
- 3 March – Thomas Otway, dramatist (died 1685)
- 13 April – Thomas Ward, religious writer, Catholic convert (died 1708)
- 1 May – John King, churchman (died 1732)
- 7 May – Edward Northey, barrister and politician (died 1723)
- 3 August – Samuel Western, politician (died 1699)
- 11 October – Nathaniel Higginson, politician (died 1708)
- 3 November – William Lowndes, politician (died 1724)
- 20 December – Samuel Bradford, bishop and politician (died 1731)

== Deaths ==
- 21 June – Inigo Jones, architect (born 1573)
- 23 August – John Byron, 1st Baron Byron, royalist politician (born 1600)
- September – Ralph Hopton, 1st Baron Hopton, royalist commander (born 1596)
- 8 October – John Greaves, mathematician and antiquarian (born 1602)
- Eleanor Davies, prophet (born 1590)
- James Hind, highwayman, executed (born 1616)
