= Edward Atslowe =

Edward Atslowe, M.D. (d. 1594), was a physician during the reign of Elizabeth I of England.

Atslowe was educated at Winchester College and New College, Oxford. After being elected to a fellowship at his college he was created 'doctor of physic' at Oxford on 27 August 1566, and was one of the four doctors appointed by convocation to dispute before Queen Elizabeth when she was entertained at the university in September of that year. Shortly afterwards Atslowe settled in London and was admitted a fellow of the College of Physicians, and between 1569 and 1583 he filled successively most of the offices of distinction connected with the society. Among his patients Astlowe reckoned the chief noblemen of his time, and he was probably attached for some years as physician to the household of the Earl of Sussex.

But he did not wholly confine himself to the practice of medicine. If not a catholic himself, he strongly sympathised with the professors of that faith, and he proved himself an ardent supporter of Mary, Queen of Scots. As early as December 1570 he paid her a visit at Tutbury. For many years he is alleged to have aided the Earls of Arundel, Northumberland, and others, in a conspiracy to obtain assistance in her behalf from the continent, and in 1579 he was arrested on that charge, but released. In 1585 he was again sent to the Tower of London; but on being privately examined by the lord chancellor and other officials as to his relations with the papists he vehemently denied having had any treasonable 'intelligence' with any of them. A spy of the Queen of Scots wrote to her, however, in July of the same year: 'I heare that Dr. Atslowe was racked twice almost to the death in the Towre about the Earl of Arundell his matters and intentions to depart Englande, wherein he was betrayed'.

Atslowe was apparently released soon afterwards, as he attended a son of the Earl of Northumberland during a fatal illness in 1587.

His death occurred some seven years later; a private letter describes him as 'newly deade' on 2 May 1594. On 2 November 1573 Atslowe married Frances Wingfield at Stoke Newington, and upon her the Earl of Arundel settled an annuity after her husband's death.
