= 1647 in England =

- Centuries: 15th; 16th; 17th; 18th; 19th
- Decades: 1620s; 1630s; 1640s; 1650s; 1660s
- See also: Other events of 1647

Events from the year 1647 in England.

== Incumbents ==
- Monarch – Charles I

== Events ==
- 30 January – Scots hand over King Charles I to England in return for £40,000 of army back-pay. Thomas Fairfax meets the King beyond Nottingham and escorts him to Holdenby House in Northamptonshire.
- March – folk dancing and bear-baiting banned.
- 10 March – set aside by Parliament as a day of public humiliation under terms of February's "An Ordinance, concerning the growth and spreading of Errors, Heresies, and Blasphemies, and for setting apart a day of Publike Humiliation, to seeke Gods assistance for the suppressing and preventing the same."
- 15 March – Harlech surrenders; the last Royalist castle to do so.
- 18 May – the House of Commons decides to disband the Army.
- 4 June – King Charles I taken to Newmarket as a prisoner of the New Model Army.
- June – the Long Parliament passes an ordinance confirming abolition of the feasts of Christmas, Easter and Whitsun, though making the second Tuesday in each month a secular holiday.
- 15 July – the King is allowed (at the request of Fairfax) to meet his children (James, Duke of York, Henry Stuart, Duke of Gloucester, and Princess Elizabeth) for what will be the last time, at the Greyhound Inn, Maidenhead.
- 2 August – the King rejects the proposals set out in the Heads of Proposals.
- 7 August – Oliver Cromwell takes control of Parliament with the New Model Army, an attempt by Presbyterian MPs to raise the City of London having been unsuccessful.
- 8 August – Irish Confederate Wars: An English Parliamentary army defeats the Irish Confederate's Leinster army.
- 20 August – Parliament passes the Null and Void Ordinance.
- October – the Levellers publish their manifesto Agreement of the People.
- 28 October–11 November – Putney Debates between the New Model Army and Levellers concerning a new national constitution.
- 11 November – the King attempts to escape captivity but is captured and imprisoned in Carisbrooke Castle on the Isle of Wight.
- 15 November – Corkbush Field mutiny: two regiments of the New Model Army threaten to mutiny.
- 24 December – Parliament presents the King with new demands which he rejects.
- 25 December – rioting in Canterbury and elsewhere over the celebration of Christmas.
- 26 December – the King signs a secret treaty with Scotland in which he promises to impose Presbyterianism in England in return for military assistance.

=== Undated ===
- Anglican professors are dismissed from the University of Oxford.

== Births ==
- 1 April – John Wilmot, 2nd Earl of Rochester, poet (died 1680)
- 3 April – Sir Thomas Littleton, 3rd Baronet, statesman (died 1709)
- 2 July – Daniel Finch, 2nd Earl of Nottingham, privy councillor (died 1730)
- 8 July – Frances Stewart, Duchess of Richmond, courtier (died 1702)
- date unknown – Henry Aldrich, theologian and philosopher (died 1710)

== Deaths ==
- 29 January – Francis Meres, writer (born 1565)
- 12 March – Sir Matthew Boynton, 1st Baronet, Member of Parliament (born 1591)
- 29 March – Charls Butler, beekeeper and philologist (born 1560)
- 20 April – Sir John Hobart, 2nd Baronet, politician (born 1593)
- 24 May – Ferdinando Gorges, colonial entrepreneur (born 1565)
- 9 June – Leonard Calvert, colonial governor (born 1606; died in Maryland)
- 12 June – Thomas Farnaby, grammarian (born c. 1575)
- 7 July – Thomas Hooker, religious and colonial leader (born 1586)
- 1 August – Degory Wheare, historian (born 1573)
- 12 August – Matthew Hopkins, "witchfinder general" (born c. 1620)
- 24 August – Nicholas Stone, sculptor and architect (born 1586)
- 8 October – Thomas Habington, antiquarian (born 1550)
- c. 8 October – Lady Anne Stanley, noblewoman, possible heiress to the throne (born 1580)
- 11 December – John Saltmarsh, chaplain, radical preacher (born c 1610)
- Elizabeth Raleigh, widow of Walter Raleigh (born 1565)
