= Commission of Triers =

The Commission of Triers was a 38-member administrative commission established by Oliver Cromwell in 1654, during the early months of the Protectorate (1653–58), to assess the suitability of future parish ministers. The triers, and a related set of "ejectors" (whose role was to dismiss ministers and schoolmasters who were deemed unsuitable for office) were intended to be at the vanguard of Cromwell's reform of parish worship in England.

The commission was established by the Triers Ordinance. A further ordinance in August 1654 known as Gillespie's Charter extended the role of the triers to Scotland.
