= Null and Void Ordinance =

Ordinance of the Cromwellian Era parliament

The Null and Void Ordinance was an Ordinance passed by the Parliament of England on 20 August 1647. On 26 July 1647, demonstrators had invaded Parliament, forcing Independent MPs and the Speaker to flee from Westminster. On 20 August, Oliver Cromwell went to Parliament with an armed escort, following which the Null and Void Ordinance was passed, annulling all parliamentary proceedings since 26 July. Most of the Presbyterian MPs then retreated from Parliament leaving the independent MPs with a majority.
