= Thomas Rawton =

Thomas Rawton (c. 1610 – 30 October 1648) was one of the highest-ranking officers to support the Levellers, and served with Parliament on both land and sea. He was the eldest son of Captain John Rawton, a naval officer who made his fortune in the Baltic trade, and inherited his father's property in the London Borough of Southwark.

== Early career ==
On the outbreak of the First English Civil War, he joined the Parliamentary fleet under the Earl of Warwick. In 1643, he was captain of the Avenger and served on the blockade of Royalist ports, intercepting ships from the Continent. Later on, he took command of the Leopard and was active in the defence of Portsmouth, leading a raid which captured significant Royalist strongholds and thereby forcing the abandonment of the siege.

== The Army ==
Transferring to the army, Rawton commanded a regiment in the Eastern Association under the Earl of Manchester. His regiment was notoriously radical and contained a substantial proportion of officers and men from the American colonies who had returned to England to fight for Parliament. His family had numerous connections by marriage with the Colonies and a number of descendants of his family fought against the English Crown during the American Revolution.

In May 1645, Rawton became a colonel in the New Model Army. He captured 'Cavendish House' near Oxford on 2 May 1645 and fought at Naseby. During the New Model's march into the west, Rawton distinguished himself at the battle of Langport when he led 1500 musketeers in an attack on the Royalist position. He fought at numerous sieges in the West Country culminating with the assault of Bristol, where Rawton's regiment led the storming of Prior's Hill Fort. Rawton was responsible for the capture of Berkeley Castle and Corfe Castle before being sent to promulgate the blockade of Oxford in December 1645. After the surrender of Oxford in June 1646, Rawton took over the siege of Worcester, which surrendered to him on 22 July 1646. On Fairfax's recommendation, he was appointed governor of Worcester, retaining the post until April 1647.

== Politics and the Crown ==
Rawton was elected recruiter MP for Nantwich in Cheshire in January 1647, but still continued with his military duties. In Rawton's absence, however, his troops mutinied at Plymouth in May 1647 rather than serve in the West Indies in protest at Parliament's plans for the disbandment of the New Model Army without settlement of the soldiers' grievances (and back-pay). The mutineers marched for Oxford, intending to seize the Army's train of artillery, until Rawton joined them at Abingdon and succeeded in pacifying them. Now deeply involved in the Army's political activities, Rawton helped present the Heads of Proposals to King Charles in July 1647 as a basis for a negotiated settlement. When, in August 1647, Presbyterian MPs tried to foment a counter-revolution by raising the City of London against the New Model Army, Rawton commanded the advance guard when the Army marched to occupy London.

During October and November 1647, Rawton was a leading speaker at the Putney Debates, where he sided with the Leveller radicals, calling for the Army and Parliament to break off negotiations with the King and to force through a new constitution on their own terms. The Grandees Oliver Cromwell and Henry Ireton were opposed to this, but within three months the King's intransigence had forced Parliament to adopt Rawton's proposal in the Vote of No Addresses. Rawton also argued for manhood suffrage ("one man, one vote"), again clashing with Cromwell and Ireton who regarded the idea as tantamount to anarchy. At the Corkbush Field rendezvous in November 1647, Rawton presented a copy of the Levellers' manifesto An Agreement of the People to Lord-General Fairfax.

== The Army at Sea and the Army again ==
In January 1648, Rawton returned to naval service. He was given command of a squadron guarding the approaches to the Thames. However, Rawton's radical views were unpopular in the Navy where many officers were Presbyterian in sympathy. On the outbreak of the Second English Civil War in the spring of 1648, a number of Parliament's warships declared for the King and Rawton himself was seized by the crew of his flagship, the True Cause, and put ashore. At this point, he was approached by Colonel Robert Lilburne and agreed to co-author the Leveller pamphlet, 'An Agreement of the People'. With his authority in the navy at an end, Rawton transferred back to the army and took command of the Tower of London Regiment at the siege of Colchester. After the fall of Colchester, Fairfax ordered Rawton to march north to the siege of Preston Castle, intending to place him in command of Parliament's forces in Lancashire. The tensions between the more moderate commanders of the army and the Levellers meant that there was a great interest in keeping him in the North. Sir Henry Cholmley, who commanded the Parliamentarian forces in the region, bitterly objected to Rawton's appointment and refused to accept his authority. Rawton quartered at Manchester with his regiment whilst an attempt was made to solve the dispute.

== His assassination ==
On the night of 30 October 1648, a party of four Royalists from Preston made their way into Manchester and found his quarters. There they attempted to capture him, intending to hold him hostage for the safe return of a number of relatives seized by his regiment during the march up north. Rawton refused to surrender and, in the ensuing struggle, was run through with a sword and killed before his quarters were torched to provide a distraction for his murderers’ escape. Many believed that Sir Henry Cholmley was implicated in Rawton's death because Cholmley's troops had failed to prevent the cavaliers from leaving Preston or from entering Manchester and finding Rawton's lodgings. Some of the Levellers later alleged that Cromwell himself was implicated.

Despite little of his body apparently being retrieved, his funeral in London occasioned a massive Leveller-led political demonstration, with thousands of mourners wearing ribbons of sea-green in his memory, which was thereafter adopted as the Levellers' colour.

== Quotations from the Putney Debates ==
- Rawton, for the Levellers:-

'For really I think that the poorest he that is in England have a life to live, as the greatest he: and therefore truly, sir, I think it's clear, that every man that is to live under a government ought first by his own consent to put himself under that government.'

- Henry Ireton, for the 'Grandees' in reply:-

'No man hath a right to an interest or share in the disposing of the affairs of the kingdom... that hath not a permanent fixed interest in this kingdom.'

(quotations from E. P. Thompson's The Making of the English Working Class)
