= 1657 in England =

- Centuries: 15th; 16th; 17th; 18th; 19th
- Decades: 1630s; 1640s; 1650s; 1660s; 1670s
- See also: Other events of 1657

Events from the year 1657 in England.

== Incumbents ==
- Lord Protector – Oliver Cromwell

== Events ==
- 8 January – Miles Sindercombe and his group of disaffected Levellers are betrayed in their attempt to assassinate Oliver Cromwell by blowing up the Palace of Whitehall in London and arrested.
- 29 January – Rule of the Major-Generals (regional military government) in England is abolished on rejection of the Militia Bill in the House of Commons.
- 4 February – resettlement of the Jews in England: Oliver Cromwell gives Antonio Fernandez Carvajal the assurance of the right of Jews to remain in England. This year the country's first Jewish cemetery in modern times is opened in London.
- 23 February – Oliver Cromwell is offered the Crown by the Humble Petition and Advice.
- 13 March – Anglo-Spanish War (1654–1660): With the Treaty of Paris, France and England form an alliance against Spain; England receives Dunkirk.
- 20 April – Anglo-Spanish War: Battle of Santa Cruz de Tenerife: Admiral Robert Blake destroys a Spanish treasure fleet under heavy fire at Santa Cruz de Tenerife.
- 8 May – Cromwell formally rejects the offer to become King.
- 9 June – act establishes the office of Postmaster General.
- 17 August – Admiral Blake dies of old wounds at sea off Plymouth. His body is given a lying in state in the Queen's House, Greenwich and a full state funeral in Cromwell's presence, and he becomes one of the first commoners to be honoured by burial in Westminster Abbey (although reinterred after the Restoration).
- 26 June
  - Cromwell is installed as Lord Protector for the second time at a ceremony at Westminster.
  - Parliament reinforces the "Oath of Abjuration": anyone refusing to swear an oath to renounce the Pope's supremacy is to be "adjudged a Papist" and suffer confiscation of two-thirds of their property.
- 13 July – following his refusal to take the oath of allegiance to Oliver Cromwell, English army leader John Lambert is ordered to resign his commissions.
- Undated – England's first chocolate house is opened in London, together with the Rainbow Coffee House, the city's second such establishment; while tobacconist and coffee house owner Thomas Garway is the first person to introduce tea in England.

== Publications ==
- Thomas Middleton's tragedy Women Beware Women (posthumous).

== Births ==
- 26 January – William Wake, Archbishop of Canterbury (died 1737)
- 29 January – Francis Moore, astrologer (died 1715)
- 24 February – Clopton Havers, physician (died 1702)
- 15 March – Sir Thomas Isham, 3rd Baronet, aristocrat and diarist (died 1681)
- 10 June – James Craggs the Elder, politician (died 1721)
- 26 November – William Derham, minister and writer (died 1735)
- 14 December – Edmund Dunch, Member of Parliament (died 1719)
- approx. date
  - Charles FitzCharles, 1st Earl of Plymouth, Royal bastard (died on active service 1680)
  - Elizabeth Villiers, Royal mistress (died 1733)

== Deaths ==
- 13 February – Miles Sindercombe, failed assassin of Oliver Cromwell (year of birth unknown) (suicide by poisoning while awaiting execution)
- ? April – Richard Lovelace, Cavalier poet (born 1617)
- May – George Radcliffe, politician (born 1599)
- 3 June – William Harvey, physician (born 1578)
- 17 August – Robert Blake, admiral (born 1598)
- 29 August – John Lilburne, dissenter (born c. 1614)
- November – John French, physician and chemist (born c. 1616)
- 20 November – Sir Hugh Cholmeley, 1st Baronet, Member of Parliament (born 1600)
- 5 December – drowned in shipwreck on the Goodwin Sands:
  - Sir John Reynolds, soldier (born 1625)
  - Major Francis White, soldier (year of birth unknown)
