= 1649 in England =

- Centuries: 15th; 16th; 17th; 18th; 19th
- Decades: 1620s; 1630s; 1640s; 1650s; 1660s
- See also: Other events of 1649

Events from the year 1649 in England. The Second English Civil War ends and the Third English Civil War begins.

== Incumbents ==
- Monarch – Charles I (until 30 January)

== Events ==
- 3 January – An explosion of several barrels of gunpowder in Tower Street, London kills 67 people and destroys 60 houses.
- 4 January – The Rump Parliament passes an ordinance to set up a High Court of Justice for the trial of Charles I for high treason in the name of the people of England.
- 20 to 27 January – Trial and conviction of King Charles I by the High Court of Justice convened in Westminster Hall.
- 30 January
  - King Charles is beheaded outside the Banqueting House, Whitehall.
  - Prince Charles Stuart declares himself King Charles II of England, Scotland and Ireland. At this time none of the three Kingdoms have recognised him as ruler. Parliament this day has passed an "Act prohibiting the proclaiming any person to be King of England or Ireland, or the Dominions thereof".
  - HMS Garland (of Topsham), carrying some of the royal possessions into exile, is wrecked in St Ives Bay (Cornwall) with only 2 survivors of about sixty passengers and crew.
- 9 February – Eikon Basilike: the Pourtrature of His Sacred Majestie in His Solitudes and Sufferings, purporting to be the spiritual autobiography of Charles I, is published.
- 23 February – Ships of the Parliamentary navy are to fly the flag of England.
- 17 March – The Rump Parliament formally abolishes the English monarchy by passing an act abolishing the kingship creating the Commonwealth of England, a republican form of government later extended to Scotland and Ireland.
- 19 March – The House of Commons passes an act abolishing the House of Lords, declaring that it is "useless and dangerous to the people of England".
- March – Robert Blake is promoted to become a General at Sea of the English fleet.
- April – Bishopsgate mutiny: Soldiers of the New Model Army refuse to leave London – some are court martialled and one executed.
- 2 May – Lawyer and regicide Sir Isaac Dorislaus, while in The Hague to negotiate an alliance with the Dutch Republic, is murdered by royalist exiles.
- 17 May – Banbury mutiny ends – leaders of the Leveller mutineers in the New Model Army are hanged at Burford.
- 19 May – An act declaring England to be a Commonwealth is passed by the Rump Parliament.
- 22 May–October – Robert Blake blockades Prince Rupert's fleet in Kinsale, Ireland.
- August
  - The Diggers abandon their last major colony, at St. George's Hill, Weybridge.
  - Sale and breaking up of the crown jewels of England under terms of the Act for the Sale of the Goods and Personal Estate of the Late King, Queen and Prince begins.
- 15 August – Oliver Cromwell lands in Dublin to begin the Cromwellian conquest of Ireland.
- 3–11 September – Siege of Drogheda in Ireland: Cromwell's New Model Army massacres the Irish Catholic Confederation garrison.
- 2–11 October – Sack of Wexford in Ireland: New Model Army massacres the Irish Catholic Confederation garrison.
- October – John Milton's Eikonoklastes: in Answer to a Book Intitl'd Eikon Basilike, a defence of the execution of Charles I, is published.

== Births ==
- 23 February (bapt.) – John Blow, composer and organist (died 1708)
- 9 April – James Scott, 1st Duke of Monmouth, claimant to the thrones of England, Scotland and Ireland (died 1685)
- 15 September – Titus Oates, minister and plotter (died 1705)

== Deaths ==
- 30 January – King Charles I of England, Scotland, and Ireland (executed) (born 1600 in Scotland)
- 9 March
  - James Hamilton, 1st Duke of Hamilton (executed) (born 1606)
  - Henry Rich, 1st Earl of Holland, soldier (executed) (born 1590)
- 26 March – John Winthrop First Governor of Massachusetts Bay Colony (born c. 1587)
- 11 July – Susanna Hall, daughter and heir of William Shakespeare (born 1583)
- 6 September – Robert Dudley, styled Earl of Warwick, explorer and geographer (born 1574)
- 15 September – John Floyd, Jesuit preacher (born 1572)
