= 1653 in England =

- Centuries: 15th; 16th; 17th; 18th; 19th
- Decades: 1630s; 1640s; 1650s; 1660s; 1670s
- See also: Other events of 1653

Events from the year 1653 in England.

== Incumbents ==
- Lord Protector – Oliver Cromwell (starting 16 December)

== Events ==
- 18–20 February (28 February–2 March New Style) – First Anglo–Dutch War: Battle of Portland off the Isle of Portland. Both sides claim victory but the English retain control of the Channel.
- 14 March – First Anglo–Dutch War: Battle of Leghorn: A Dutch fleet defeats the English in the Mediterranean but the Dutch commander, Johan van Galen, later dies of his wounds.
- 18 April – London–York stagecoach first recorded.
- 20 April – Oliver Cromwell dissolves the Rump Parliament.
- 2–3 June (12–13 June New Style) – First Anglo-Dutch War: Battle of the Gabbard off the coast of Suffolk: The English navy defeats the Dutch fleet, which loses 17 ships.
- 4 July–12 December – the Barebones Parliament meets in London.
- 8 July – John Thurloe becomes Cromwell's head of intelligence.
- 8–10 August – Battle of Scheveningen: the final naval battle of the First Anglo-Dutch War is fought, between the fleets of the Commonwealth and the United Provinces off the Texel; the English navy gains a tactical victory over the Dutch fleet.
- 16 December – Instrument of Government: Britain's first written constitution, under which Oliver Cromwell becomes Lord Protector of England, Scotland, and Ireland, being advised by a remodelled Council of State. This is the start of The First Protectorate, bringing an end to the first period of republican government in the country, the Commonwealth of England.

=== Undated ===
- Cornelius Vermuyden completes excavation of the Forty Foot Drain and associated works for reclamation of The Fens.
- Sir Robert Shirley has a new parish church built at Staunton Harold in Leicestershire.

== Publications ==
- Izaak Walton's discourse The Compleat Angler.

== Births ==
- 10 March – John Benbow, admiral (died 1702 in Jamaica)
- 2 April – Prince George of Denmark, consort of Anne, Queen of Great Britain (died 1708)
- 5 July – Thomas Pitt, Governor of Madras (died 1726)
- 9 August – John Oldham, poet (died 1683)
- 14 August – Christopher Monck, 2nd Duke of Albemarle, statesman (died 1688)
- 3 September – Roger North, lawyer and biographer (died 1734)

== Deaths ==
- 21 January – John Digby, 1st Earl of Bristol, diplomat (born 1580)
- 25 March – Nicholas Martyn, politician (born 1593)
- 26 May – Robert Filmer, political theorist (born 1588)
- 22 October – Thomas de Critz, painter (born 1607)
- December – John Taylor, "The Water Poet" (born 1578)
