= 1661 in England =

- Centuries: 15th; 16th; 17th; 18th; 19th
- Decades: 1640s; 1650s; 1660s; 1670s; 1680s
- See also: Other events of 1661

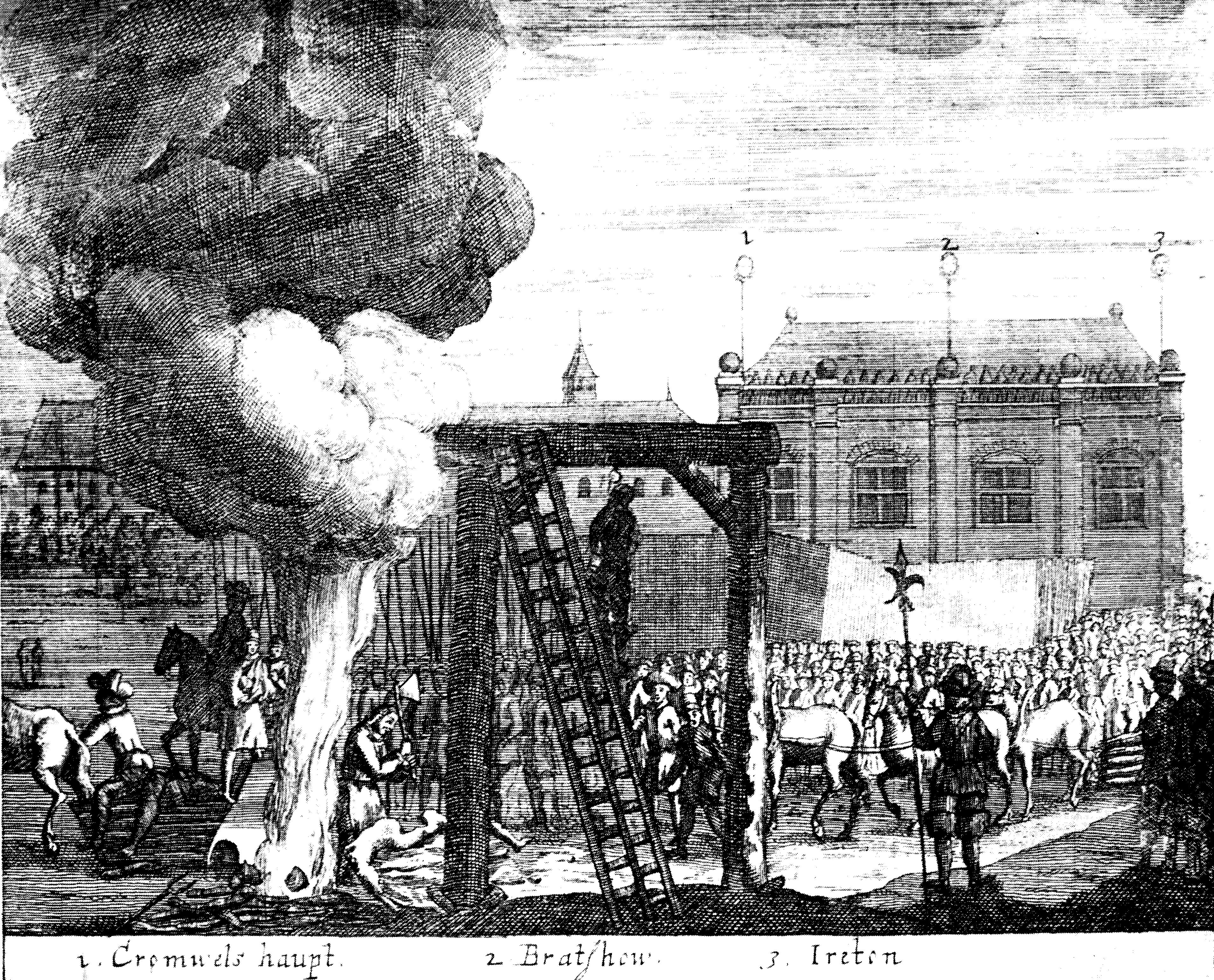
An engraving depicting the execution of Cromwell, Ireton and Bradshaw in 1661.

Events from the year 1661 in England.

== Incumbents ==
- Monarch – Charles II

== Events ==
- 6 January – the Fifth Monarchists unsuccessfully attempt to seize control of London. George Monck's regiment defeats them.
- 30 January – the bodies of Oliver Cromwell, Henry Ireton, John Bradshaw and Thomas Pride are exhumed and subjected to a posthumous execution. Oliver Cromwell's head (with the others') is placed on a spike above the Palace of Westminster.
- 14 February – George Monck's regiment becomes The Lord General's Regiment of Foot Guards (which later becomes the Coldstream Guards).
- 15 April – the Savoy Conference of bishops and Presbyterians fails to agree on a new revision of the Prayer Book.
- 19 April – the Post Office introduces post marks.
- 23 April – Charles II of England, Scotland and Ireland is crowned King in Westminster Abbey. A new St Edward's Crown is made for the occasion.
- 8 May – first meeting of the Cavalier Parliament.
- 5 June – Isaac Newton admitted to Trinity College, Cambridge.
- 23 June – Charles II signs a marriage treaty with Portugal. He will marry Catherine of Braganza; as part of the dowry, Portugal cedes Bombay and Tangier to England and grants free trade with Brazil and the East Indies.
- 28 June – Lisle's Tennis Court in Lincoln's Inn Fields, London is opened as a playhouse.
- 30 July – Acts of Parliament passed:
  - Sedition Act makes it high treason to plot death or injury to, or war against, the king, but requires the evidence of at least two witnesses for a conviction.
  - Tumultuous Petitioning Act restricts the number of people who may present a petition to the king or parliament.
- 1 October – a yacht race from Greenwich to Gravesend between King Charles and James, Duke of York makes the sport fashionable.
- October
  - Collection of a "free and voluntary present" of cash for the King from householders commences.
  - King Charles II appoints Peter Lely as his court painter.
- December – convocations at Canterbury and York complete the new Anglican Prayer Book (imposed by law in 1662).
- 20 December – Parliament passes the Corporation Act 1661 restricting public office to members of the Church of England.

== Publications ==
- Robert Boyle publishes The Sceptical Chymist in London, in which he developed the idea of elements and "corpuscles" (atoms).
- John Evelyn's pamphlet Fumifugium is one of the earliest descriptions of air pollution.

== Births ==
- 21 January – Peter Le Neve, herald and antiquary (died 1729)
- 20 February – William Digby, 5th Baron Digby, politician (died 1752)
- 25 February – Anne Lennard, Countess of Sussex, née Palmer or FitzRoy, illegitimate daughter of Charles II (died 1721/2)
- 16 April – Charles Montagu, 1st Earl of Halifax, poet and statesman (died 1715)
- 7 May – George Clarke, politician and architect (died 1736)
- 11 August – William Churchill, politician (died 1737)
- 31 August – Charles Granville, 2nd Earl of Bath, diplomat (died 1701)
- 1 October – Sir Matthew Dudley, 2nd Baronet, Member of Parliament (died 1721)
- 22 October – Margaret Holles, Duchess of Newcastle-upon-Tyne, noblewoman (d. 1717)
- 28 November – Edward Hyde, 3rd Earl of Clarendon, Governor of New York and New Jersey (died 1723)
- 3 December – Nathaniel Gould, politician (died 1728)
- 5 December – Robert Harley, 1st Earl of Oxford and Mortimer, statesman (died 1724)
- date unknown
  - Samuel Garth, physician and poet (died 1719)
  - Nicholas Hawksmoor, architect (died 1736)
  - Charles Paulet, 2nd Duke of Bolton, supporter of William III of Orange (died 1722)

== Deaths ==
- 19 January – Thomas Venner, Fifth Monarchist (executed) (year of birth unknown)
- 1 March – Richard Zouch, jurist (born 1590)
- 7 April – William Brereton, soldier and politician (born 1604)
- 16 August – Thomas Fuller, churchman and historian (born 1608)
- 19 November – Brian Walton, clergyman and scholar (born 1600)
