= 1650 in England =

- Centuries: 15th; 16th; 17th; 18th; 19th
- Decades: 1630s; 1640s; 1650s; 1660s; 1670s
- See also: Other events of 1650

Events from the year 1650 in England, second year of the Third English Civil War.

== Events ==
- 1 May – claimant King Charles II of England signs the Treaty of Breda with the Scottish Covenanters.
- 10 May – Commonwealth (Adultery) Act (1650) imposes the death penalty for incest, and for adultery, that is defined as sexual intercourse between a married woman and a man other than her husband. Both partners would be liable for death sentence in such a case, although the courts are reluctant to impose the ultimate penalty. If a man (married or unmarried) has sex with an unmarried woman (including a widow), that would be fornication, punishable only by three months for first offenders, applicable to both partners. In the history of adultery in English law, this represents the only time since the twelfth century when adultery has been outlawed in secular statute law.
- 17 May – a quarter of the New Model Army at the Siege of Clonmel in Ireland is trapped and killed.
- 26 May – Oliver Cromwell leaves Ireland (following the Siege of Clonmel), occasioning Andrew Marvell's An Horatian Ode upon Cromwell's Return from Ireland.
- 23 June – Charles arrives in Scotland (at Garmouth) where he signs the Covenant.
- 13 August – Colonel George Monck forms Monck's Regiment of Foot, forerunner of the Coldstream Guards.
- 3 September – Oliver Cromwell is victorious over the Scottish Covenanters at the Battle of Dunbar, opening the Anglo-Scottish war (1650–1652).
- 19 September – Treaty of Hartford: the English Connecticut Colony and the Dutch Republic's colony of New Netherland establish their frontiers in North America.
- 29 September – Henry Robinson opens his Office of Addresses and Encounters, a form of employment exchange, in Threadneedle Street, London.
- 30 October – the Religious Society of Friends acquires the nickname "Quakers" when the judge at George Fox's blasphemy trial says that they "tremble at the word of the Lord".
- 14 December – domestic servant Anne Greene is hanged at Oxford Castle for infanticide, having concealed an illegitimate stillbirth. The following day she revives in the dissection room and, being pardoned, lives until 1665.

=== Undated ===
- Cornelius Vermuyden completes excavation of the New Bedford River as part of the drainage of The Fens.
- William How publishes his flora Phytologia Britannica.
- Puritans chop down the original Glastonbury Thorn.

== Births ==
- 2 February (?) – Nell Gwyn, actress and royal mistress (died 1687)
- 24 March – Sir Jonathan Trelawny, 3rd Baronet, bishop (died 1721)
- 18 April – Sir Edward Dering, 3rd Baronet, Member of Parliament (died 1689)
- 20 April – William Bedloe, informer (died 1680)
- 1 May (bapt.) – John Radcliffe, physician (died 1714)
- 26 May – John Churchill, 1st Duke of Marlborough, general (died 1722)
- 14 September – Theophilus Oglethorpe, soldier and Member of Parliament (died 1702)
- 23 September – Jeremy Collier, theatre critic, non-juror bishop and theologian (died 1726)
- 20 October – Robert Shirley, 1st Earl Ferrers, courtier (died 1717)
- 7 November – John Robinson, diplomat (died 1723)
- November – Cloudesley Shovell, admiral (died 1707)
- 14 November – King William III of England, Scotland, and Ireland (died 1702)
- 1 December (bapt.) – William Talman, architect (died 1719)
- Undated
  - George Rooke, admiral (died 1709)
  - Richard Lumley, 1st Earl of Scarbrough, statesman (died 1721)
- Approximate date
  - Solomon de Medina, French-born army contractor (died 1720)
  - Charlotte Paston, Countess of Yarmouth, née FitzRoy, noblewoman, illegitimate daughter of Charles II (died 1684)

== Deaths ==
- February – Sir Thomas Bowyer, 1st Baronet, politician (born 1586)
- 9 March – Elizabeth Savage, Countess Rivers, courtier (born 1581)
- 18 April – Simonds d'Ewes, antiquarian and politician (born 1602)
- 9 July (burial) – Alice Barnham, wife of Francis Bacon (born 1592)
- 25 August – Richard Crashaw, poet (born c. 1613)
- 8 September – Princess Elizabeth of England, daughter of Charles I (born 1635)
- 13 November – Thomas May, poet and historian (born 1595)
- 13 December – Phineas Fletcher, poet (born 1582)
- 25 December – Thomas Cooper, former Usher of Gresham's School and Royalist, hanged
- Probable date – Isaac Ewer, soldier and regicide (year of birth unknown)
