= 1645 in England =

- Centuries: 15th; 16th; 17th; 18th; 19th
- Decades: 1620s; 1630s; 1640s; 1650s; 1660s
- See also: Other events of 1645

Site of the Battle of Rowton Heath

Events from the year 1645 in England. This is the fourth year of the First English Civil War, fought between Roundheads (Parliamentarians) and Cavaliers (Royalist supporters of King Charles I).

== Incumbents ==
- Monarch – Charles I

== Events ==
- 3 January – the Long Parliament adopts A Directory for the Publique Worship of God throughout the Three Kingdoms of England, Scotland, and Ireland. Together with an Ordinance of Parliament for the taking away of the Book of Common-Prayer, and for Establishing and Observing of this Present Directory throughout the Kingdom of England and the Dominion of Wales, drawn up by a parliamentary subcommittee appointed by it, replacing the Book of Common Prayer. Holy Days (other than Sundays) are not to be observed.
- 10 January – Archbishop of Canterbury William Laud executed for treason on Tower Hill, London.
- 14 January – English Civil War: Fairfax appointed Commander-in-Chief.
- 29 January–22 February – English Civil War: Treaty of Uxbridge, armistice talks at Uxbridge, which prove fruitless.
- 15 February – English Civil War: New Model Army officially founded.
- 4 March – English Civil War: Prince Rupert leaves Oxford for Bristol.
- 3 April – the House of Lords passes the Self-denying ordinance, requiring members of the Parliament of England to resign commissions in the armed services.
- 1 June – English Civil War: Prince Rupert's army sacks Leicester.
- 10 June – English Civil War: Cromwell confirmed as Lieutenant-General of Cavalry.
- 14 June – English Civil War: Battle of Naseby – 12,000 Royalist forces are beaten by 15,000 Parliamentarian soldiers.
- 28 June – English Civil War – Royalists lose Carlisle.
- 10 July – English Civil War: Cromwell wins the Battle of Langport, Somerset.
- 27 August – eighteen suspected witches hanged following the Bury St. Edmunds witch trial.
- 10 September – English Civil War: Prince Rupert surrenders Bristol.
- 24 September – English Civil War: Parliamentarians defeat Royalist cavalry at the Battle of Rowton Heath.
- 8–14 October – English Civil War: Third siege of Basing House by Cromwell results in its destruction.
- 11 October – English Civil War: Re-fortification of Bourne Castle in Lincolnshire against a threatened Royalist attack begins.
- 25 December – Christmas, being omitted from the Directory of Public Worship is not officially observed under Parliamentarian rule.

== Births ==
- 15 June – Sidney Godolphin, 1st Earl of Godolphin, politician (died 1712)
- John Ayloffe, political radical (executed 1685)
- Daniel Burgess, divine (died 1713)
- John Fenwick, Jacobite conspirator (executed 1697)
- Anthony Grey, 11th Earl of Kent (died 1702)
- John Mill, theologian (died 1707)
- Josias Priest, dancer (died 1735)
- John Reading, composer and organist (died 1692)
- George Walker, Church of Ireland clergyman and royalist soldier (killed at Battle of the Boyne 1690)
- William Winde, architect (died 1722)

== Deaths ==
- 2 January
  - Edward Barrett, 1st Lord Barrett of Newburgh, politician (born 1581; buried)
  - John Hotham, the younger, Member of Parliament (born 1610; executed)
- 3 January – Sir John Hotham, 1st Baronet, parliamentarian (year of birth unknown; executed)
- 10 January – William Laud, Archbishop of Canterbury (born 1573; executed)
- 11 January – Henry Gage, soldier (born 1597; died of wounds)
- 30 January – Mary Ward, nun (born 1585)
- 1 February – Henry Morse, Catholic priest (born 1549; executed)
- 18 February – Richard Baker, historian (born 1568)
- 10 March – William Strode, poet (born c. 1602)
- 3 April (bur.) – Emilia Lanier, poet (born 1569)
- 16 April – Tobias Hume, composer (born c. 1579 in Scotland)
- 17 April – Daniel Featley, Calvinist theologian (born 1578)
- 21 April – William Smith, composer (born 1603; buried)
- 17 July – Robert Carr, 1st Earl of Somerset, politician (born c. 1587)
- 6 August – Lionel Cranfield, 1st Earl of Middlesex, merchant (born 1575)
- 16 August – Tobias Hume, composer (born c. 1559)
- 27 August – Edward Littleton, 1st Baron Lyttelton, judge (born 1589)
- 9 September – William Strode, parliamentarian (born 1598)
- 14 September – Sir Richard Grosvenor, 1st Baronet, Member of Parliament (born 1585)
- 24 September – William Lawes, composer and musician (born 1602)
- 27 October – Philip Stanhope, Royalist colonel (year of birth unknown; died of wounds)
- 22 November – John Philipot, officer of arms (born 1588)
- Approximate date – William Browne, poet (born c. 1590)
