= 1659 in England =

- Centuries: 15th; 16th; 17th; 18th; 19th
- Decades: 1630s; 1640s; 1650s; 1660s; 1670s
- See also: Other events of 1659

Events from the year 1659 in England.

== Incumbents ==
- Lord Protector – Richard Cromwell (until 25 May)

== Events ==
- 27 January – the third and final session of the Third Protectorate Parliament of the Commonwealth of England is opened by Lord Protector Richard Cromwell, with Chaloner Chute as the Speaker of the House of Commons and 567 members. "Cromwell's Other House", which replaces the House of Lords during the last years of the Protectorate, opens on the same day, with Richard Cromwell as its speaker.
- 31 January – Central England temperature record begins monthly recording, retrospectively.
- 16 February – the first known cheque (400 pounds) is written.
- 1 March – in exile in the Netherlands while plotting the restoration of the monarchy to Britain, Charles appoints seven royalists (including six from the "Sealed Knot" group) to a "Great Trust and Commission" to make plans for a post-restoration government. The Great Trust is led by Charles's trusted advisor, Edward Hyde.
- 9 March – Sir Lislebone Long is elected as Speaker of the House of Commons after Chaloner Chute becomes seriously ill. Long serves only six days before dying on 16 March. Chute remains Speaker but himself dies on 14 April and is replaced by Thomas Bampfield.
- 6 April – Council of Officers petitions Parliament to oppose Royalists and make up arrears of army pay.
- 18 April – Cromwell dissolves the Council of Officers and orders its members to leave London.
- 22 April – Lord Protector Richard Cromwell is forced by the 'Wallingford House party' (grandees of the New Model Army, who have assembled troops around Westminster) to dissolve the Third Protectorate Parliament, the Commonwealth's last.
- 25 April – great fire in Southwold, Suffolk.
- 5 May – first British colonists, from the East India Company, land on Saint Helena.
- 7 May – Rump Parliament reassembles at the invitation of the Council of Officers and appoints a Committee of Safety to form the executive until a new Council of State is appointed on 19 May.
- 21 May – Concert of The Hague signed by England, France and the Dutch Republic, agreeing a common position on the Second Northern War.
- 25 May – Richard Cromwell resigns as Lord Protector after the Rump promises to pay his debts and a pension. The executive government is replaced by the restored Council of State, dominated by Generals John Lambert, Charles Fleetwood (Richard Cromwell's brother-in-law) and John Desborough.
- 3 August – Booth's Uprising, led by George Booth, begins in the city of Chester as 3,000 royalists attempt a revolt against the military government. On 5 August, a Protectorate Army of 5,000 troops, dispatched by Parliament under the command of Major-General John Lambert, begins marching to suppress the rebellion.
- 7 August – as Booth's Uprising spreads to Liverpool, Thomas Myddelton, Randolph Egerton and fellow royalists take control of the town of Wrexham in Wales and proclaim Charles II to be King.
- 15 August – two English warships block the entrance to the River Dee to prevent supplies from reaching Booth's rebels in Chester, while Lambert's Protectorate Army advances into Cheshire at Nantwich.
- 19 August – at the Battle of Winnington Bridge, the Protectorate Army under the command of Lambert, routs the 4,000 rebels commanded by George Booth with Edward Broughton (from Wales). Lambert and his forces, exhausted from their rapid march and the battle, elect not to pursue the fleeing rebels and less than 30 of them are killed.
- 12 October – the Rump Parliament dismisses Major-General John Lambert and other generals.
- 13 October – the Council of State is dismissed by the Rump Parliament and Lambert excludes the Rump Parliament from the Palace of Westminster.
- 25 October – the Committee of Safety replaces the Council of State.
- 3 November – General George Monck, in command of an army in Scotland which he has purged of radical elements, declares for Parliament.
- 4 December – Sir Arthur Haselrig arrives in Portsmouth and draws up a declaration encouraging citizens to "restore Parliament to their former freedom"; the garrison comes over to him.
- 16 December – General Monck demands free parliamentary elections in Scotland and resolves to overthrow the military government of Britain.
- 24 December – Charles Fleetwood resigns his military command to the Speaker of Parliament.
- 26 December – the Rump Parliament is restored to power at Westminster.

== Births ==
- 1 January – Humphrey Hody, theologian and archdeacon (died 1707)
- 26 March – William Wollaston, philosophical writer (died 1724)
- 20 August – Henry Every, pirate

== Deaths ==
- 26 July – Mary Frith, cutpurse (born c.1584)
- 20 September – Thomas Morton, deposed bishop (born 1564)
- 21 October – Sir Richard Grenville, 1st Baronet, Royalist exile (born 1600)
- 31 October – John Bradshaw, judge and regicide (born 1602)
