= 1663 in England =

- Centuries: 15th; 16th; 17th; 18th; 19th
- Decades: 1640s; 1650s; 1660s; 1670s; 1680s
- See also: Other events of 1663

Events from the year 1663 in England.

== Incumbents ==
- Monarch – Charles II

== Events ==
- 10 January – the Royal African Company is granted a Royal Charter.
- February – Parliament pressures King Charles into withdrawing a proposed Declaration of Indulgence for Catholics and nonconformists.
- 24 March – the colony of Province of Carolina is established in North America.
- 27 March – the gold guinea coin worth one pound sterling (introduced 6 February) is proclaimed legal tender.
- 7 May – opening of the Theatre Royal, Drury Lane in London.
- 8 July – King Charles grants a Royal Charter to the North American Colony of Rhode Island and Providence Plantations.
- 27 July – Parliament passes the second Navigation Act, requiring all goods bound for the American colonies to be sent in English ships from English ports.
- 21 August – concerned about the wintry weather, Parliament holds an intercessory fast.
- 28 August – severe frost.
- 31 August – Gilbert Sheldon enthroned as Archbishop of Canterbury.
- October – The Farnley Wood Plot to overthrow the monarchy.
- Undated – Roger L'Estrange is appointed Surveyor of the Imprimery and Printing Presses and licenser of the press.

== Births ==
- 25 February – Pierre Antoine Motteux, translator and dramatist (died 1718)
- 6 March – Francis Atterbury, bishop and man of letters (died 1732)
- 17 May – Sir William Glynne, 2nd Baronet, Member of Parliament (died 1721)
- 12 July – James Stuart, Duke of Cambridge, son of King James II (died 1667)
- 28 September – Henry FitzRoy, 1st Duke of Grafton, illegitimate son of King Charles II, military commander (died of wounds 1690)
- John Berkeley, 3rd Baron Berkeley of Stratton, admiral (died 1697)
- William Bowyer, printer (died 1737)
- Thomas Emlyn, clergyman (died 1741)
- William King, poet (died 1712)
- George Stepney, poet and diplomat (died 1707)

== Deaths ==
- 6 January – George Goring, 1st Earl of Norwich, soldier (born 1585)
- 29 January – Robert Sanderson, Bishop of Lincoln (born 1587)
- April – George Fane, Member of Parliament (born c. 1616)
- 2 April – Henry Cary, 4th Viscount Falkland, Member of Parliament (born 1634)
- 4 June – William Juxon, Archbishop of Canterbury (born 1582)
- 25 June – John Bramhall, Archbishop (born 1594)
- 5 July – Samuel Newman, clergy (born 1602)
- 26 August – Sir John Yonge, 1st Baronet, Member of Parliament (born 1603)
- Edward Burrough, Quaker (born 1634)
- Cheney Culpeper, alchemist (born 1601)
- Balthazar Gerbier, artist (born 1592, Netherlands)
