= 1648 in England =

- Centuries: 15th; 16th; 17th; 18th; 19th
- Decades: 1620s; 1630s; 1640s; 1650s; 1660s
- See also: Other events of 1648

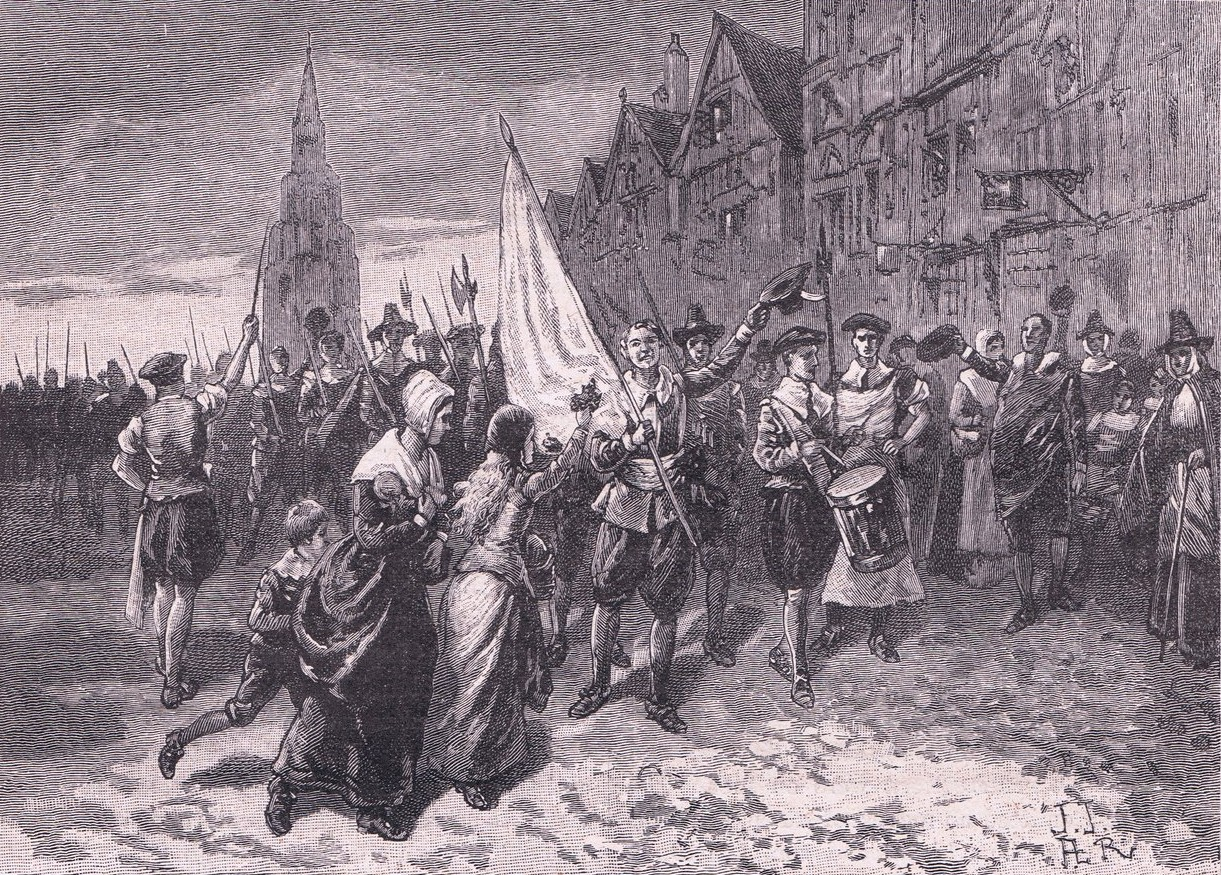
Herbert Railton - Rising of the London apprentices on behalf of Charles I, AD 1648

Events from the year 1648 in England. The Second English Civil War begins.

== Incumbents ==
- Monarch – Charles I

== Events ==
- 17 January – the Long Parliament passes the Vote of No Addresses, breaking off negotiations with King Charles I and thereby setting the scene for the Second English Civil War.
- 11 February – ordinances passed against plays; actors to be fined and theatres pulled down.
- 8 March – Royalists seize Pembroke Castle in Wales.
- 30 April – Royalists capture Berwick and Carlisle.
- 2 May
  - The Parliament of Scotland votes in favour of war with England on behalf of the King.
  - The Parliament of England passes an act against blasphemy.
- 8 May – Second English Civil War: Parliamentary victory at the Battle of St. Fagans in Wales.
- 16 May – Parliamentarians massacre 70 Cornish royalists at Penzance, leading to a local rising which is put down in The Gear Rout.
- 1 June – Second English Civil War: Parliamentary victory at the Battle of Maidstone.
- 12 June - The Siege of Colchester begins, lasting 11 weeks.
- 11 July – Second English Civil War: Siege of Pembroke ends with surrender of Pembroke Castle to Cromwell.
- 17–19 August – Second English Civil War: Oliver Cromwell's New Model Army defeats the Royalist Scottish army of the Duke of Hamilton at the Battle of Preston.
- 27 August – Second English Civil War: Thomas Fairfax takes Colchester for Parliament.
- 11 September – the Levellers' largest petition, "To The Right Honourable The Commons Of England", is presented to the Long Parliament after amassing signatories including about a third of all Londoners (including women).
- 15 September–27 November – Second English Civil War: Parliamentary Commissioners and the King negotiate the Treaty of Newport at Newport, Isle of Wight.
- 7–18 November – the New Model Army's General Council, convening at St Albans Abbey, debates and adopts the "Remonstrance of General Fairfax and the Council of Officers", largely drawn up by Henry Ireton, proclaiming the sovereignty of the people and calling for a trial of the King. On 20 November, a delegation of officers present the Remonstrance to Parliament.
- 1 December – the King, under arrest, is moved from the Isle of Wight to Hurst Castle on the mainland.
- 5 December – majority of the House of Commons votes in favour of accepting the Treaty of Newport.
- 6 December – Pride's Purge: Troops of the New Model Army under the command of Colonel Thomas Pride (and under the orders of General Ireton) arrest or exclude Presbyterian members of the Long Parliament who are not supporters of the Army's Grandees or Independents, creating the Rump Parliament which on 13 December annuls the Treaty of Newport.
- 7 December – Cromwell returns to London having taken the surrender of Pontefract Castle.
- 19–22 December – the King, under arrest, is moved from Hurst Castle to Windsor.
- 28–29 December – the Rump Parliament gives first and second readings to an ordinance instituting a special High Court of Justice for the trial of Charles I.
- Approximate date – a Religious Society of Friends (Quakers) begins to form around George Fox.

== Births ==
- 1 January – Elkanah Settle, writer (died 1724)
- 23 February – Arabella Churchill, mistress of King James II (died 1730)
- 7 April – John Sheffield, 1st Duke of Buckingham and Normanby, statesman and poet (died 1721)
- August – Thomas Wharton, 1st Marquess of Wharton, politician (died 1715)
- 15 December – Gregory King, statistician (died 1712)
- John Coode, colonial governor (died 1709)
- Moll Davis, entertainer and courtesan, a mistress of King Charles II (died 1708)
- Richard Hoare, banker (died 1718)
- James Cecil, 3rd Earl of Salisbury, nobleman (died 1683)
- Thomas Thynne, landowner and politician (died 1682)

== Deaths ==
- 7 January (bur.) – Henry Burton, puritan theologian (born 1578)
- 2 February – George Abbot, puritan writer (born c. 1605)
- 16 February – Robert Holborne, lawyer and politician (born c. 1598)
- 23 February (bur.) – Laurence Hilliard, miniature painter (born 1582)
- 14 March – Ferdinando Fairfax, 2nd Lord Fairfax of Cameron, general (born 1584)
- 20 August – Edward Herbert, 1st Baron Herbert of Cherbury, diplomat, poet, and philosopher (born 1583)
- 28 August
  - George Lisle, Royalist commander (executed) (born c. 1610)
  - Charles Lucas, Royalist commander (executed) (born 1613)
- 30 October
  - Thomas Rainsborough, Leveller (killed in an attempted abduction by Royalists) (born 1610)
  - Thomas Rawton, Leveller (killed in an attempted abduction by Royalists) (born c. 1610)
- 17 November – Thomas Ford, composer (born c. 1580)
- December – Peter Oliver, miniature painter (born 1594)
