= 1662 in England =

- Centuries: 15th; 16th; 17th; 18th; 19th
- Decades: 1640s; 1650s; 1660s; 1670s; 1680s
- See also: Other events of 1662

Events from the year 1662 in England.

== Incumbents ==
- Monarch – Charles II

== Events ==
- c. January – John Graunt, in one of the earliest uses of statistics, publishes information about births and deaths in London.
- 17 March – two old women are hanged after being found guilty of witchcraft at the Bury St. Edmunds witch trial.
- 9 May – Samuel Pepys witnesses an "Italian puppet show" in London, the first Punch and Judy show on record.
- 14 May – Catherine of Braganza lands at Portsmouth.
- 16 May – hearth tax is introduced in England, Wales and Scotland.
- 19 May – Acts of Parliament passed:
  - Act of Uniformity approves the 1662 Book of Common Prayer.
  - The Poor Relief Act ("Settlement and Removal Act") sets out principles for establishing the parish to which a person belongs (their place of 'settlement'), which would be responsible should they become in need of Poor Relief.
  - The Licensing of the Press Act restricts London printers to a total of 24. Books printed abroad are prohibited. Roger L'Estrange is granted a warrant to seize seditious books or pamphlets.
- 21 May – Catherine of Braganza marries Charles II of England at Portsmouth in both a secret Catholic and a public Anglican ceremony the day after they first meet.
- 15 July – the Royal Society receives its royal charter.
- 23 August – an extravagant pageant on the River Thames greets the arrival of Charles II and his new queen Catherine of Braganza on their arrival at the Palace of Whitehall from Hampton Court.
- 24 August – the Act of Uniformity is implemented, making mandatory in the Church of England the forms of worship prescribed in the 1662 Book of Common Prayer. This is followed by the Great Ejection of over 2000 clergy who refuse to take the required oath of conformity to the established church.
- 27 October – Charles II sells Dunkirk to France for £400 000 (2.5 million livres).
- Undated – 2nd edition of Robert Boyle's New Experiments Physico-Mechanicall, Touching The Spring of the Air, and its Effects is published in Oxford containing Boyle's law.

== Births ==
- 6 January – Robert Sutton, 2nd Baron Lexinton, diplomat (died 1723)
- 9 January – John Holles, 1st Duke of Newcastle (died 1711)
- 27 January – Richard Bentley, classical scholar (died 1742)
- 10 March – Francis Pierrepont, politician (died 1693)
- 9 April – Edward Hawarden, Catholic theologian (died 1735)
- 30 April – Mary II of England, Scotland and Ireland, queen regnant (died 1694)
- 18 May – George Smalridge, Bishop of Bristol (died 1719)
- 7 June – Celia Fiennes, traveller (died 1741)
- 18 June – Charles FitzRoy, 2nd Duke of Cleveland, illegitimate son of Charles II, courtier (died 1730)
- 1 July – John Dolben, politician (died 1710)
- 13 August – Charles Seymour, 6th Duke of Somerset, politician (died 1748)
- 6 October – William Walsh, poet, critic, correspondent and Member of Parliament (died 1708)
- 17 October – Arthur Rawdon, Member of Parliament (died 1695)
- 18 October – Matthew Henry, Presbyterian minister (died 1714)
- 11 November
  - John Chesshyre, lawyer (died 1738)
  - Alexander Pendarves, politician (died 1726)
- 26 November – John Hudson, classical scholar (died 1719)
- 17 December – Samuel Wesley, poet and clergyman (died 1735)
- unknown date – Charles Montagu, 1st Duke of Manchester (died 1722)

== Deaths ==
- 13 February – Elizabeth Stuart, Queen of Bohemia (born 1596 in Scotland)
- 14 April – William Fiennes, 1st Viscount Saye and Sele, statesman (born 1582)
- 19 April – Miles Corbet, Puritan politician (born 1595)
- 22 April – John Tradescant the younger, botanist and gardener (born 1608)
- 8 May – Peter Heylin, ecclesiastical writer (born 1599)
- 14 June – Henry Vane the Younger, Governor of Massachusetts (born 1613)
- 3 September – William Lenthall, politician (born 1591)
- 20 September – John Gauden, bishop and writer (born 1605)
- 22 September – John Biddle, Unitarian theologian (born 1615)
- 21 October – Henry Lawes, composer (born 1595)
