= 1658 in England =

- Centuries: 15th; 16th; 17th; 18th; 19th
- Decades: 1630s; 1640s; 1650s; 1660s; 1670s
- See also: Other events of 1658

Events from the year 1658 in England.

== Incumbents ==
- Lord Protector – Oliver Cromwell (until 3 September), Richard Cromwell (starting 3 September)

== Events ==
- 4 February – Oliver Cromwell dissolves the Second Protectorate Parliament.
- April – first stage coach services advertised: 4-day trips from London to Exeter, York and Chester.
- 14 June – Anglo-Spanish War (1654–1660): Battle of the Dunes – a French and English army defeats the Spanish in the Spanish Netherlands.
- 25–27 June – Anglo-Spanish War: Battle of Rio Nuevo – a Spanish invasion force fails to recapture Jamaica from the English.
- 30 August – hurricane storms in southern England, the worst for centuries.
- 3 September – Oliver Cromwell dies in Whitehall (probably of sepsis) aged 59 on the anniversary of his great military victories at Dunbar and Worcester, and his 3rd son Richard is appointed to his father's position as Lord Protector of England, Scotland and Ireland.
- October
  - Savoy Declaration, A Declaration of the Faith and Order owned and practised in the Congregational Churches in England, is drawn up by Independents and Congregationalists meeting at the Savoy Hospital, London.
  - First domestic pendulum clocks advertised for sale in England, by Ahasuerus Fromanteel of London.
- 23 November – The elaborate funeral ceremony of the former Lord Protector, Oliver Cromwell (who had died on 3 September and was buried in Westminster Abbey two weeks later), is carried out in London. A little more than two years later (in January 1661), his body will be disinterred, subjected to a posthumous execution and his head placed on a spike.
- Undated – Tea first arrives in England, exported from China via Holland.

== Publications ==
- Thomas Browne – Hydriotaphia, Urn Burial and The Garden of Cyrus
- The Whole Duty of Man

== Births ==
- 5 May (bapt.) – Thomas Bray, clergyman (died 1730)
- 3 July – Hester Pinney, businesswoman (died 1740)
- 16 August – Ralph Thoresby, historian (died 1724)
- 16 September – John Dennis, dramatist and critic (died 1734)
- 5 October – Mary of Modena, queen of King James II (died 1718)
- 10 December – Lancelot Blackburne, clergyman (died 1743)
- approximate date
  - Elizabeth Barry, actress (died 1713)
  - Theodore Janssen, Member of Parliament and financier (died 1748)
  - Charles Mordaunt, 3rd Earl of Peterborough, military leader (died 1735)

== Deaths ==
- 7 January – Theophilus Eaton, colonial leader (born 1590)
- 13 January – Edward Sexby, Puritan soldier, plotter against Cromwell (born 1616)
- 19 April – Robert Rich, 2nd Earl of Warwick, Admiral (born 1587)
- 29 April – John Cleveland, poet (born 1613)
- 2 August (bur.) – Humphrey Edwards, regicide of Charles I (born 1582)
- 6 August – Elizabeth Claypole, daughter of Oliver Cromwell (born 1629)
- 10 August – George Harding, 8th Baron Berkeley, noble (born 1601)
- 3 September – Oliver Cromwell, Lord Protector (born 1599)
- September – Lucy Walter, royal mistress, in France (born c.1630 in Wales)
- Sir John Fenwick, 1st Baronet, Royalist (born c. 1570)
- Robert Walker, portrait painter (born 1599)
