= 1643 in England =

- Centuries: 15th; 16th; 17th; 18th; 19th
- Decades: 1620s; 1630s; 1640s; 1650s; 1660s
- See also: Other events of 1643

Events from the year 1643 in England. This is the second year of the First English Civil War, fought between Roundheads (Parliamentarians) and Cavaliers (Royalist supporters of King Charles I).

== Incumbents ==
- Monarch – Charles I

== Events ==
- 19 January – First English Civil War: Royalist victory at the Battle of Braddock Down secures dominance in Cornwall.
- 23 January – First English Civil War: Leeds falls to Parliamentary forces.
- 13 March – First English Civil War: Parliamentary victory at the First Battle of Middlewich in Cheshire.
- 18 March – Irish Confederate Wars: Battle of New Ross in Ireland – English troops defeat those of Confederate Ireland.
- 19 March – First English Civil War: Royalist victory at the Battle of Hopton Heath in Staffordshire, but the Royalist commander, the Earl of Northampton, is killed.
- 25 April – First English Civil War:
  - Reading falls to Parliament after the Siege of Reading.
  - Despite being vastly outnumbered, a Parliamentarian force under James Chudleigh defeats a Royalist army near Okehampton in Devon, at the Battle of Sourton Down.
- 8 May – First English Civil War: The first siege of Wardour Castle in Wiltshire ends after 6 days with the surrender of the Royalist garrison under Lady Blanche Arundell.
- 13 May – First English Civil War: Parliamentary forces led by Oliver Cromwell defeat Royalist forces at Grantham.
- 16 May – First English Civil War: Royalist victory at the Battle of Stratton confirms dominance in Cornwall and Devon.
- 21 May – First English Civil War: Capture of Wakefield by an outnumbered force of Parliamentarians from the Royalist defenders.
- 14 June – Licensing Order of 1643 passed by Parliament to censor newspapers.
- 18 June – First English Civil War: Royalist victory at the Battle of Chalgrove Field in Oxfordshire.
- 30 June – First English Civil War: Royalist victory at the Battle of Adwalton Moor gives control of Yorkshire.
- 1 July – the Westminster Assembly of theologians ("divines") and parliamentarians is convened at Westminster Abbey with the aim of restructuring the Church of England.
- 5 July – First English Civil War: pyrrhic Royalist victory at the Battle of Lansdowne near Bath, Somerset.
- 13 July – First English Civil War: Royalist cavalry led by Henry Wilmot, newly created Baron Wilmot, win a crushing victory at the Battle of Roundway Down near Devizes over Parliamentarians led by Sir William Waller.
- 26 July – First English Civil War: Royalists capture Bristol.
- 28 July – First English Civil War: Parliamentary victory at the Battle of Gainsborough.
- 18 August – Parliament passes "An Ordinance for Explanation of a former Ordinance for Sequestration of Delinquents Estates with some Enlargements", including an "Oath of Abjuration" of the Pope.
- c. 26 August – Parliament passes an ordinance for the cleansing of churches from altars and other monuments of "superstition" or "idolatry".
- 20 September – First English Civil War: strategic Parliamentary victory at the First Battle of Newbury over Royalist forces led personally by the king.
- 25 September – the Solemn League and Covenant is signed between the Parliament of England and the Parliament of Scotland.
- 11 October – First English Civil War: Parliamentary victory at the Battle of Winceby in Lincolnshire.
- 13 December – First English Civil War: Parliamentary victory at the Battle of Alton in Hampshire.
- 25 December – Christmas Island is sighted and named by Captain William Mynors of the English East India Company's ship Royal Mary.
- 27 December – First English Civil War: Royalist victory at the Second Battle of Middlewich.

== Publications ==
- Cromwell's Soldiers' Pocket Bible.
- Dr Thomas Browne's spiritual testament Religio Medici ("true and full coppy").

== Births ==
- 4 January (N.S.) – Isaac Newton, mathematician and physicist (died 1727)
- 16 February – John Sharp, Archbishop of York (died 1714)
- 1 November – John Strype, historian and biographer (died 1737)

== Deaths ==
- 14 January – John Bois, Bible translator (born 1560)
- 2 March – Robert Greville, 2nd Baron Brooke, Parliamentary General, killed by sniper (born 1608)
- 19 March – Spencer Compton, 2nd Earl of Northampton, soldier and politician, killed in action (born 1601)
- 24 June – John Hampden, parliamentarian, died of wounds (born c. 1595)
- 5 July – Bevil Grenville, soldier (born 1595)
- 25 July – Robert Pierrepont, 1st Earl of Kingston-upon-Hull, statesman (born 1584)
- 20 August – Anne Hutchinson, Puritan preacher (born 1591)
- 20 September, at the First Battle of Newbury:
  - Lucius Cary, 2nd Viscount Falkland, politician, soldier and author (born c. 1610)
  - Robert Dormer, 1st Earl of Carnarvon (born 1610)
  - Henry Spencer, 1st Earl of Sunderland (born 1620)
- 3 November – John Bainbridge, astronomer (born 1583)
- 29 November – William Cartwright, dramatist (born 1611)
- 8 December – John Pym, statesman (born 1583)
- approx. date – Henry Glapthorne, dramatist (born 1610)
