= 1664 in England =

- Centuries: 15th; 16th; 17th; 18th; 19th
- Decades: 1640s; 1650s; 1660s; 1670s; 1680s
- See also: Other events of 1664

Events from the year 1664 in England.

== Incumbents ==
- Monarch – Charles II

== Events ==
- 12 March – Province of New Jersey becomes an English colony in North America.
- 5 April – Passing of the Triennial Parliaments Act 1664.
- 25 April – King Charles appoints the Royal Commission of 1664 to increase oversight of the American colonies.
- May – Parliament passes the Conventicle Act 1664 preventing groups of more than five non-followers of the Church of England from assembling (comes into effect 1 July). Jews will be excluded from its operation.
- 18 August – England annexes the New Netherland colony in North America, renaming it the Province of New York (after James, Duke of York).
- 27 September – Dutch Governor Peter Stuyvesant surrenders New Amsterdam to an English naval squadron commanded by Colonel Richard Nicolls.
- 28 October – The "Duke of York and Albany's maritime regiment of foot" is formed in London, origin of the Royal Marines.

=== Undated ===
- Robert Holmes's second African expedition to the Guinea coast captures Dutch forts and ships.
- Construction begins of the Sheldonian Theatre for university ceremonial in Oxford as designed by Christopher Wren.
- Francis Child enters the London goldsmith's business which, as the private banking house of Child & Co., will continue into the 21st century.

== Births ==
- 24 January (bapt.) – John Vanbrugh, playwright and architect (died 1726)
- 28 February – Thomas Newcomen, inventor (died 1729)
- 3 July – James Stanley, 10th Earl of Derby, politician (died 1736)
- 21 July – Matthew Prior, poet and diplomat (died 1721)
- 3 September – Richard Newport, 2nd Earl of Bradford, peer and politician (died 1723)
- 5 September – Charlotte Lee, Countess of Lichfield, née Fitzroy, illegitimate daughter of Charles II (died 1718)
- 18 October – George Compton, 4th Earl of Northampton, (died 1727)
- 9 November – Henry Wharton, writer (died 1695)
- probable – William Mountfort, actor (died 1692)
- possible – Daniel Purcell, composer (died 1717)

== Deaths ==
- 20 January – Isaac Ambrose, diarist (born 1604)
- February – John Hoskins, painter (year of birth unknown)
- 28 March – Accepted Frewen, Archbishop of York (born 1588)
- 31 March – Charlotte Stanley, Countess of Derby, Royalist (born 1599)
- c. April – John Goodyer, botanist (born 1592)
- 7 May – John Tufton, 2nd Earl of Thanet, noble (born 1608)
- 22 June – Katherine Philips, poet (born 1631)
- August – John Lisle, Regicide of Charles I (born 1610)
- 11 September – John Hutchinson, Roundhead colonel (born 1615)
- 8 October – John Boys, Royalist (born 1607)
- Sir Henry Brooke, 1st Baronet, Parliamentary supporter in the English Civil War (year of birth unknown)
- Richard Overton, Leveller pamphleteer (born 1599)
