= Peter Oliver (painter) =

English painter

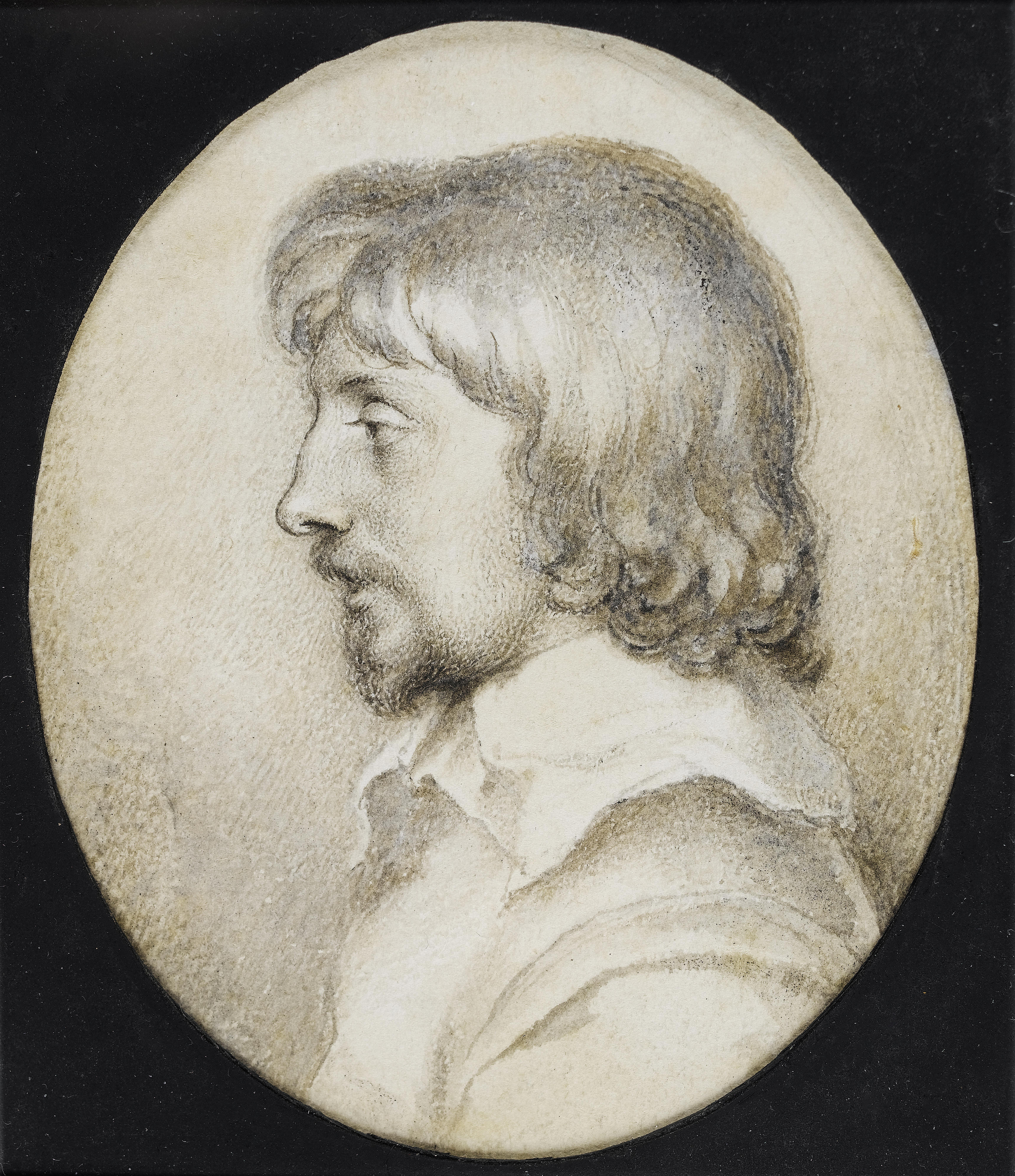
Peter Oliver

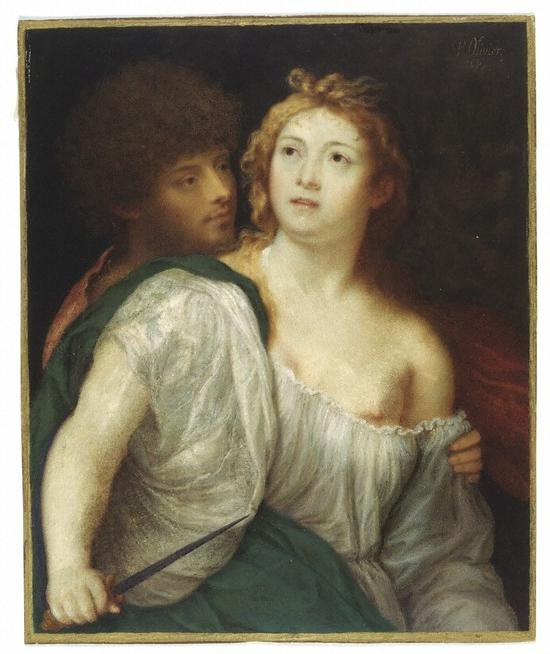
Tarquin and Lucretia, Miniature, 1630–1640, Peter Oliver V&A Museum no. 1787-1869

Peter Oliver (1589 – before 27 December 1647) was an English miniaturist.

He was born in 1589, the eldest son of Isaac Oliver, a French-born English portrait miniature painter, and his first wife, Elizabeth (1570/71–1599). When he died, Isaac Oliver left his finished and unfinished drawings for Peter, with the hope that he would live to exercise the art of his father. Isaac's other sons appear to have been under-age at the time of his death, and were probably therefore by a later wife than Peter's mother. Peter Oliver resided at Isleworth, and was buried, on 27 December 1647, beside his father at St Annes, Blackfriars.

He was even more eminent in miniature painting than his father, and is specially remarkable for a series of copies in watercolor he made after celebrated pictures by old masters. Most of these were done by the desire of the king, and seven of them still remain at Windsor Castle. A great many of Oliver's works were purchased by Charles II from his widow; several of his drawings are in existence, and a leaf from his pocket-book in the collection of the earl of Derby. His most important work is the group of the three grandsons of Anthony Browne, 1st Viscount Montague with their servant, now belonging to the marquess of Exeter; and there are fine miniatures by him at Welbeck Abbey, Montagu House, Sherborne Castle, Minley Manor, Belvoir Castle and in the private collection of Queen Wilhelmina.
