= 1646 in England =

- Centuries: 15th; 16th; 17th; 18th; 19th
- Decades: 1620s; 1630s; 1640s; 1650s; 1660s
- See also: Other events of 1646

Events from the year 1646 in England. This is the fifth and last year of the First English Civil War, fought between Roundheads (Parliamentarians) and Cavaliers (Royalist supporters of King Charles I).

== Incumbents ==
- Monarch – Charles I

== Events ==
- 9 January – Battle of Bovey Heath: Parliamentary troops secure a significant victory over the Royalists in mid-Devon.
- 12 January – Royalists abandon the siege of Plymouth.
- 16 February – the Battle of Torrington at Great Torrington in north Devon, the last major battle of the First English Civil War, gives a decisive Parliamentary victory over the Royalists.
- 2 March – the Prince of Wales escapes from Cornwall into exile.
- 13 March – Parliament captures Cornwall after Royalists surrender at Truro.
- 21 March – last Royalist army in the field surrenders at Stow-on-the-Wold, although individual fortresses still hold out.
- 13 April – Exeter surrenders to Parliamentary forces.
- 19 April – Barnstaple surrenders to Parliamentary forces.
- 27 April – King Charles I flees from Oxford (where he has been overwintering) in disguise and begins his journey to the Scottish army camp near Newark.
- 5 May – King Charles I surrenders his forces to a Scottish army at Southwell, Nottinghamshire.
- 20 June – Third Siege of Oxford concludes with signing of the surrender of the Royalist garrison at Oxford to General Thomas Fairfax's Parliamentary New Model Army; on the 24th of June the main force marches out, ending the First English Civil War.
- July – John Lilburne is imprisoned for a second time, this time in the Tower of London, for denouncing his former commander as a traitor and Royalist sympathiser; the campaign to free Lilburne gives rise to the populist political movement called the Levellers.
- 7 July – Levellers William Walwyn and Richard Overton publish Remonstrance of Many Thousand Citizens calling for the abolition of the monarchy.
- 22 July – the Siege of Worcester ends with the city's capture by the Parliamentary forces led by Thomas Rainsborough.
- 27 July – Wallingford Castle surrenders to Sir Thomas Fairfax after a 65-day siege.
- 30 July – Commissioners of Parliament and Scottish Covenanters meeting in Newcastle upon Tyne set out the Heads of Proposals ("Newcastle Propositions") demanding that the King gives up control of the army and place restrictions on Catholics, as the basis for a constitutional settlement.
- August – The Westminster Assembly of Divines begins to draw up the Westminster Confession of Faith; the draft is printed and sent to Parliament in December.
- 17 August – the garrison at Pendennis Castle in Cornwall, the last mainland English Royalist stronghold, surrenders after a 155-day siege.
- 19 August – Henry Somerset, 1st Marquess of Worcester, surrenders Raglan Castle in Monmouthshire to General Fairfax after a 2-month siege.
- October – Anglican episcopacy formally abolished.
- 23 December – the Covenanters hand over the King to the Parliamentarians.
- 25 December – scuffles in Bury St Edmunds over the celebration of Christmas.

== Publications ==
- Thomas Browne's work Pseudodoxia Epidemica, which introduces the word 'electricity' to the language.
- John Milton's Poems (dated 1645).
- James Shirley's Poems including the masque The Triumph of Beauty.
- John Suckling's play The Goblins.

== Births ==
- 19 August – John Flamsteed, astronomer (died 1719)
- 9 November – John Egerton, 3rd Earl of Bridgewater, politician (died 1701)
- 27 November – Edward Howard, 2nd Earl of Carlisle, politician (died 1692)

== Deaths ==
- 24 March – Sir Thomas Aston, 1st Baronet, Member of Parliament (born 1600)
- 20 July – William Twisse, church leader (born 1578)
- 1 September – Francis Windebank, statesman (born 1582)
- 14 September – Robert Devereux, 3rd Earl of Essex, English Civil War general (born 1591)
- 4 October – Thomas Howard, 21st Earl of Arundel, statesman (born 1586)
- 28 October (bur.) – William Dobson, portrait painter (born 1611)
- 18 December – Henry Somerset, 1st Marquess of Worcester (born 1577)
