= 1655 in England =

- Centuries: 15th; 16th; 17th; 18th; 19th
- Decades: 1630s; 1640s; 1650s; 1660s; 1670s
- See also: Other events of 1655

Events from the year 1655 in England.

== Incumbents ==
- Lord Protector – Oliver Cromwell

== Events ==
- 22 January – Oliver Cromwell dissolves the First Protectorate Parliament.
- 11–14 March – Penruddock uprising: a Royalist uprising beginning in Wiltshire is defeated by a skirmish in South Molton.
- 28 April – Admiral Robert Blake destroys the pirate fleet of the bey of Tunis.
- 10–27 May – Anglo-Spanish War: Invasion of Jamaica – Forces led by William Penn and Robert Venables capture the island of Jamaica from Spain.
- 9 August – the Rule of the Major-Generals, a period of direct military government, begins.
- 24 November – Anglican services prohibited by Cromwell.
- 4–18 December – Whitehall Conference convened by Cromwell to debate the Resettlement of the Jews in England.

=== Ongoing events ===
- Anglo-Spanish War 1654–1660

== Publications ==
- John Wallis's Arithmetica Infinitorum, first work on differential calculus.

== Births ==
- 11 January – Henry Howard, 7th Duke of Norfolk, politician and soldier (died 1701)
- 23 April (bapt.) – Andrew Allam, writer (died 1685)
- 25 April – John Lowther, 1st Viscount Lonsdale, politician (died 1700)
- 3 June – William Nicolson, bishop and antiquary (died 1727)
- 20 July – Ford Grey, 1st Earl of Tankerville, statesman (died 1701)
- 12 November – Francis Nicholson, military officer and colonial governor (died 1728)
- 28 December – Charles Cornwallis, 3rd Baron Cornwallis, First Lord of the British Admiralty (died 1698)
- Sir John Barker, 4th Baronet, politician (died 1696)

== Deaths ==
- 31 January (bur.) – Anthony Stapley, politician and regicide (born 1590)
- February – George Brydges, 6th Baron Chandos, royalist peer (smallpox) (born 1620)
- 18 March – Richard Smith, Catholic bishop (in France) (born 1568)
- 16 May – John Penruddock, Cavalier (executed) (born 1619)
- after May – Elizabeth Alkin, Parliamentarian publisher, nurse and spy (born c. 1600)
- by 9 June – Sir Thomas Mauleverer, 1st Baronet, Member of Parliament and regicide (born 1599)
- 26 June – Edward Conway, 2nd Viscount Conway, politician, royalist military commander and bibliophile (in France) (born 1594)
- 19 November – Stephen Marshall, nonconformist minister (born 1594)
- December – Robert Cox, comic performer
