= 1656 in England =

- Centuries: 15th; 16th; 17th; 18th; 19th
- Decades: 1630s; 1640s; 1650s; 1660s; 1670s
- See also: Other events of 1656

Events from the year 1656 in England.

== Incumbents ==
- Lord Protector – Oliver Cromwell

== Events ==
- 2 April – Anglo-Spanish War: King Philip IV of Spain signs a treaty with the exiled Charles II of England for the reconquest of England.
- May – first performance of The Siege of Rhodes, Part I, by Sir William Davenant (with music by Henry Lawes, Matthew Locke, Captain Cooke and others) the first English opera (under the guise of a recitative), in a private theatre at his home, Rutland House, in the City of London. This also includes the innovative use of painted backdrops and the appearance of England's first professional actress, Mrs. Coleman.
- 17 September
  - The Second Protectorate Parliament assembles.
  - Miles Sindercombe makes a failed assassination attempt on Oliver Cromwell.
- 19 September – Anglo-Spanish War: Admiral Robert Blake destroys a Spanish treasure fleet near Cádiz.
- 24 October – Quaker James Nayler re-enacts the arrival of Jesus in Jerusalem at Bristol, for which he is arrested for blasphemy.

=== Undated ===
- Resettlement of the Jews in England is permitted.
- The only English fifty shilling coin is minted.
- Adams' Grammar School is founded in Newport, Shropshire by London haberdasher William Adams, a native of the town.
- Cromwell and his Privy Council issue an order for the founding of Durham College.
- The King's Own Regiment of Guards is raised at Bruges under the command of the Earl of Rochester for the defence of the exiled Charles II, origin of the Grenadier Guards.

=== Ongoing events ===
- Anglo-Spanish War 1654–1660

== Publications ==
- James Harrington's political tract The Commonwealth of Oceana.
- The Musaeum Tradescantianum catalogue (the first such in England) Musæum Tradescantianum: or, A Collection of Rarities, preserved at South-Lambeth neer London by John Tradescant.

== Births ==
- 1 January – William Fleetwood, economist and statistician (died 1723)
- 14 September – Thomas Baker, antiquarian (died 1746)
- 29 October – Edmond Halley, scientist (died 1742)
- 17 November – Charles Davenant, economist (died 1714)

== Deaths ==
- 9 June – Thomas Tomkins, composer (born 1572 in Wales)
- 20 June – Henry Bard, 1st Viscount Bellomont, Royalist (born 1616)
- 8 September – Joseph Hall, bishop and writer (born 1574)
- 12 September – Philip Stanhope, 1st Earl of Chesterfield (born 1584)
- 28 October – Stephen Bachiler, clergyman (born c. 1561)
- 6 November – Sir Robert Harley, statesman (born 1579)
