= 1560s in England =

Events from the 1560s in England.

== Incumbents ==
- Monarch – Elizabeth I

== Events ==
- 1560
  - 27 February – Treaty of Berwick: Terms agreed with the Lords of the Congregation in the Kingdom of Scotland for English forces to enter Scotland to expel French troops defending the Regency of Mary of Guise.
  - 6 July – Treaty of Edinburgh between England, France and Scotland, ending the Siege of Leith. The French withdraw from Scotland, largely ending the Auld Alliance between the two countries, and recognise Elizabeth I of England.
  - Solihull School founded.
- 1561
  - 1 March – Kingston Grammar School is chartered.
  - 4 June – the spire of Old St Paul's Cathedral in the City of London catches fire and crashes through the nave roof, probably as the result of a lightning strike. The spire is not rebuilt.
  - 25 June – astrologer Francis Coxe is pilloried at Cheapside in London, and makes a public confession of his involvement in "sinistral and divelysh artes".
  - August – English merchant Anthony Jenkinson arrives in Moscow on his second expedition to the Grand Duchy of Moscow.
  - Merchant Taylors' School is founded in the City of London by Sir Thomas White, Sir Richard Hilles, Emanuel Lucar and Stephen Hales, with Richard Mulcaster as first headmaster.
  - Reform of coinage to combat debasement.
  - The first Calvinists settle in England, after fleeing Flanders.
  - First publication (anonymously in London) of William Baldwin's Beware the Cat (written 1553), an early example of extended fiction (and specifically of horror fiction) in English. This edition appears to have been suppressed and no copies survive.
- 1562
  - 18 January – first performance of Thomas Norton and Thomas Sackville's play Gorboduc before Queen Elizabeth I. It is the first known English tragedy and the first English language play to employ blank verse.
  - March – Anthony Jenkinson has an audience with Ivan the Terrible in Moscow before continuing his expedition to Qazvin, capital of the Safavid dynasty in Persia.
  - 20 September – Treaty of Hampton Court between Queen Elizabeth and Huguenot leader Louis, Prince of Condé.
  - October – John Hawkins initiates the trans-Atlantic slave trade, shipping slaves from Sierra Leone to Hispaniola.
  - 4 October – English troops occupy Le Havre in France in aid of the Huguenots.
  - Church of England approves the Thirty-Nine Articles of Religion, defining its doctrinal stance.
  - Publication of the metrical psalter The Whole Booke of Psalmes, Collected into English Meter, compiled mostly by Thomas Sternhold and John Hopkins and printed by John Day.
  - Dudley Grammar School established and Gresham's School granted a royal charter.
- 1563
  - March
    - Poor Relief Act requires wealthier parishes to help their poorer neighbours.
    - First English-language edition of Foxe's Book of Martyrs, John Foxe's account of Protestant persecution during the reign of Mary I of England, is printed by John Day in London.
  - April – Parliament passes laws requiring Justices of the Peace to arbitrate trade disputes and conditions of apprenticeship.
  - June to October – 1563 London plague outbreak kills over 20,000.
  - 28 July – the English surrender Le Havre to the French after a siege.
  - Publication of John Shute's The First and Chief Groundes of Architecture, the first work in English on architecture.
- 1564
  - 11 April – Treaty of Troyes: England receives monetary compensation for renouncing its claims to Calais.
  - 30 April – consecration of new St Michael the Archangel parish church at Woodham Walter in Essex, probably the first new post-Reformation Church of England place of worship.
  - July – Anthony Jenkinson returns to London from his second expedition to the Grand Duchy of Moscow, having gained a considerable extension of trading rights for the English Muscovy Company.
- 1565
  - Thomas Gresham founds the Royal Exchange in London.
  - College of Physicians of London first licensed to carry out human dissection.
  - John Hawkins brings the first tobacco to England.
  - Protestant weavers from Flanders, fleeing persecution, settle in Colchester.
  - Hinchingbrooke School is established as Huntingdon Grammar School.
- 1566
  - Henry Sidney leads a punitive expedition to Ulster.
  - March – Matthew Parker, Archbishop of Canterbury, issues the Book of Advertisements as an attempt to standardise certain church practices, most significantly regarding vestments.
  - June – German miners find calamine (needed for production of brass) in the Mendip Hills.
  - Autumn – probable completion of the Exeter Canal, the first in England, and with the first use of a pound lock in England (engineer: John Trew from Glamorgan).
- 1567
  - 2 January – Parliament dissolved as Queen Elizabeth refuses to name a successor.
  - John Brayne builds the Red Lion theatre just east of the City of London, a playhouse for touring productions and the first known to be purpose-built in the British Isles since Roman times. However, there is little evidence that the theatre survives beyond this summer's season.
  - Jean Carré arrives in England from Antwerp and obtains a royal monopoly for the production of window glass on condition that the techniques would be taught to native Englishmen.
  - Chatham Dockyard is established for the Royal Navy.
  - Rugby School is established under the will of grocer Lawrence Sheriff.
- 1568
  - 16 May – the deposed Mary, Queen of Scots, flees across the Solway Firth from Scotland to England but on May 19 is placed in custody in Carlisle Castle on the orders of Queen Elizabeth, her cousin.
  - 28 May – incorporation of two monopolies in metalliferous mining, the Society of Mines Royal and the Company of Mineral and Battery Works.
  - 23 September – Battle of San Juan de Ulúa (Anglo-Spanish War): In the Gulf of Mexico, a Spanish fleet forces English privateers under John Hawkins to end their campaign.
  - 26 September – Spain seizes English ships off the coast of Mexico and confiscates their cargo.
  - October – The Bishops' Bible (The Holie Bible) is published, a translation into English under the authority of the Church of England.
  - December – English seize bullion from Spanish ships at Plymouth.
- 1569
  - 11 January–6 May – the first known lottery in England is drawn outside St Paul's Cathedral in the City of London. Each share costs ten shillings, the first prize is £5000, and proceeds are used to repair harbours and for other public works.
  - 20 January – Mary, Queen of Scots, is detained at Tutbury Castle.
  - After September – publication in London of Thomas Preston's tragedy Cambises.
  - November–December – Rising of the North: Charles Neville, 6th Earl of Westmorland and Thomas Percy, 7th Earl of Northumberland lead a rebellion against Queen Elizabeth I in an attempt to place the Catholic Mary, Queen of Scots, on the English throne. Walter Devereux, 1st Earl of Essex drives the Earls out of England.
  - First publication of Henry de Bracton's De legibus & consuetudinibus Angliæ ("On the Laws and Customs of England", left unfinished at Bracton's death c.1268).
- Undated
  - During the decade Thomas Tallis composes his setting of the Lamentations of Jeremiah the Prophet for Maundy Thursday.

== Births ==
- 1560
  - 3 January – John Bois, Bible translator (died 1643)
  - 19 September (baptised) – Thomas Cavendish, explorer (died at sea 1592)
- 1561
  - 22 January – Francis Bacon, philosopher, scientist, statesman and essayist (died 1626)
  - June – Samuel Harsnett, Archbishop of York (died 1631)
  - 20 June (baptised) – Richard Whitbourne, colonist of Newfoundland (died 1635)
  - 23 June – Stephen Bachiler, non-conformist minister and pioneer settler of New England (died 1656)
  - 4 August – John Harington, courtier, writer and inventor (died 1612)
  - 24 August – Thomas Howard, 1st Earl of Suffolk (died 1626)
  - 11 October (baptised) – Thomas Lake, Secretary of State to King James I (died 1630)
  - 27 October – Mary Sidney, writer, patroness and translator (died 1621)
  - 9 December – Edwin Sandys, founder of the colony of Virginia (died 1629)
  - December – Christopher Newport, sea captain (died 1617 in Java)
- 1562
  - January – Edward Blount, printer (died 1632)
  - 19 October – George Abbot, Archbishop of Canterbury (died 1633)
  - John Bull, composer (died 1628)
  - Henry Constable, poet (died 1613)
  - Samuel Daniel, poet and historian (died 1619)
  - Francis Godwin, writer and prelate (died 1633)
  - Richard Neile, churchman (died 1640)
  - Henry Spelman, antiquary (died 1641)
- 1563
  - January – Penelope Blount, Countess of Devonshire, née Devereux (died 1607)
  - 5 March – John Coke, politician (died 1644)
  - 1 June – Robert Cecil, 1st Earl of Salisbury, statesman and spymaster (died 1612)
  - 19 November – Robert Sidney, 1st Earl of Leicester, statesman (died 1626)
  - 19 December – Lord William Howard (died 1640)
  - Charles Blount, 8th Baron Mountjoy (died 1606)
  - John Dowland, composer (died 1626)
  - Michael Drayton, poet (died 1631)
  - Robert Naunton, politician and writer (died 1635)
  - Josuah Sylvester, poet (died 1618)
- 1564
  - 26 February (baptised) – Christopher Marlowe, poet and dramatist (died 1593)
  - 20 March – Thomas Morton, bishop (died 1659)
  - 26 April (baptised) – William Shakespeare, poet and dramatist (died 1616)
  - 27 April – Henry Percy, 9th Earl of Northumberland (died 1632)
  - 24 September – William Adams, navigator and samurai (died 1620)
  - 4 October – John Gerard, Jesuit (died 1637 in Rome)
  - 22 November – Henry Brooke, 11th Baron Cobham, peer and traitor (died 1619)
  - Henry Chettle, dramatist (died 1607)
  - Thomas Shirley, adventurer and privateer (died 1620)
- 1565
  - 10 February – Edmund Whitelocke, soldier and courtier (died 1608)
  - July – Ferdinando Gorges, colonial entrepreneur (died 1647)
  - 10 November – Robert Devereux, 2nd Earl of Essex, politician (died 1601)
  - George Kirbye, composer (died 1634)
  - Francis Meres, churchman and author (died 1647)
  - Francis Tanfield, Governor of the South Falkland colony (year of death unknown)
- 1566
  - 1 September – Edward Alleyn, actor (died 1626)
  - 20 December – Edward Wightman, Anabaptist (burned at the stake 1612)
- 1567
  - 12 February – Thomas Campion, poet and composer (died 1620)
  - 27 February – William Alabaster, poet (died 1640)
  - 17 September – Edward Sutton, 5th Baron Dudley, landowner (died 1643)
  - November – Thomas Nashe, poet (died 1600)
- 1568
  - 30 March – Henry Wotton, author and diplomat (died 1639)
  - Richard Baker, chronicler (died 1645)
  - Edward Chichester, 1st Viscount Chichester (died 1648)
  - Gervase Markham, poet and writer (died 1637)
  - Robert Wintour, conspirator (hanged 1606)
  - Approximate date – James Montague, bishop and academic (died 1618)
- 1569
  - 16 April – John Davies, poet and lawyer (died 1626)
  - September – Arthur Lake, Bishop of Bath and Wells, a translator of the King James Bible (died 1626)
  - William Monson, admiral (died 1643)
  - John Suckling, politician (died 1627)

== Deaths ==
- 1560
  - 8 September – Amy Robsart, noblewoman (born 1532)
  - December – John Sheppard, composer and organist (born 1515)
- 1561
  - 1 September – Edward Waldegrave, politician and recusant (born c. 1516)
- 1562
  - Nicholas Grimald, poet and theologian (born 1519)
- 1563
  - 30 April – Henry Stafford, 1st Baron Stafford, nobleman (born 1501)
  - 9 June – William Paget, 1st Baron Paget, statesman (born 1506)
  - 17 September – Henry Manners, 2nd Earl of Rutland, soldier (born 1526)
  - 25 September – John Shute, architect
- 1565
  - 18 July – Kat Ashley, née Katherine Champernowne, governess of Elizabeth I (born c. 1502)
  - 14 October – Thomas Chaloner, statesman and poet (born 1521)
- 1566
  - 13 July – Sir Thomas Hoby, diplomat and translator (born 1530)
  - 31 October – Richard Edwardes, poet (born 1523)
- 1567
  - 26 January – Nicholas Wotton, diplomat (born c. 1497)
  - 12 June – Richard Rich, 1st Baron Rich, Lord Chancellor (born 1490)
  - 16 September (buried) – Lawrence Sheriff, gentleman and grocer to Elizabeth I (born 1510)
  - Thomas Beccon, Protestant reformer (born 1511)
- 1568
  - 15 January – Catherine Carey, Chief Lady of the Bedchamber to Elizabeth I (born c. 1526)
  - 20 January – Myles Coverdale, Bible translator (born c. 1488)
  - 26 January – Lady Catherine Grey, Countess of Hertford (born 1539)
  - 19 March – Elizabeth Seymour, Lady Cromwell, noblewoman (born c. 1518)
  - 7 July – William Turner, ornithologist and botanist (born 1508)
  - 23 August – Thomas Wharton, 1st Baron Wharton (born 1495)
  - 23 December – Roger Ascham, scholar, tutor of Elizabeth I (born 1515)
  - Henry Dudley, soldier, sailor, diplomat and conspirator (born 1517)
- 1569
  - 5 September – Edmund Bonner, Bishop of London (born c. 1500)
