= 1642 in England =

- Centuries: 15th; 16th; 17th; 18th; 19th
- Decades: 1620s; 1630s; 1640s; 1650s; 1660s
- See also: Other events of 1642

Events from the year 1642 in England, opening year of the English Civil War and Wars of the Three Kingdoms.

== Incumbents ==
- Monarch – Charles I

== Events ==
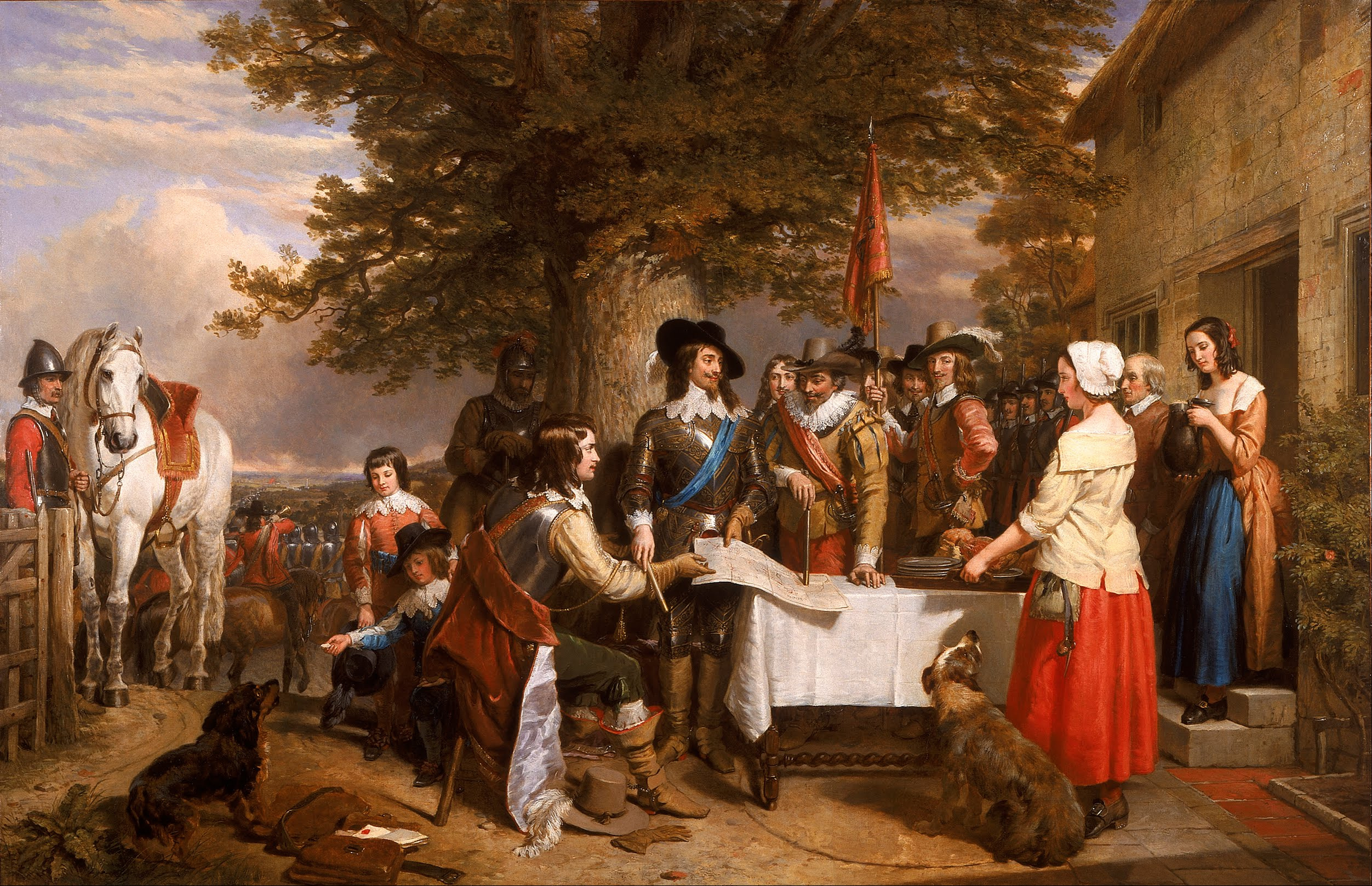
The Eve of the Battle of Edgehill by Charles Landseer, 1845

- 4 January – Charles I attempts to arrest five leading members of the Long Parliament, but they escape. This is the last time any monarch enters the House of Commons.
- January – Charles I agrees to parliament's request to order that the last Wednesday in each month should be kept as a fast day.
- 18 January–March – the Protestation of 1641, an oath of allegiance to the King and Church of England, is circulated around the country for signature by all adult males, the Protestation Returns of 1641–1642.
- 13 February – Charles assents to the Bishops Exclusion Act thereby removing all bishops from the House of Lords.
- 23 February–11 March – Queen Henrietta Maria and her eldest daughter Mary leave Falmouth, Cornwall, to go into exile at the Dutch court in The Hague. Just before she leaves, Mary becomes the first child of an English Sovereign to be granted the title Princess Royal.
- 27 February – Charles rejects the Militia Bill.
- 5 March – Parliament declares that "the People are bound by the Ordinance for the Militia, though it has not received the Royal Assent".
- April – the governor of Kingston upon Hull twice refuses access to the King.
- 1 June – Parliament approves the Nineteen Propositions to be sent to the King, demanding parliamentary control of the civil government of the kingdom.
- 21 June – The King's Answer, rejecting the Nineteen Propositions, is read in Parliament.
- 10 July–30 July – Charles besieges Hull in an attempt to gain control of its arsenal.
- 22 August – Charles raises the royal battle standard over Nottingham Castle, so beginning the First English Civil War against his own Parliament.
- 2 September – Parliament orders the theatres of London to be closed, effectively ending the era of English Renaissance theatre.
- 7 September – First English Civil War:
  - Siege of Portsmouth (begun on 10 August) ends with Royalists surrendering the port to Parliament.
  - Battle of Babylon Hill in Dorset, an indecisive skirmish.
- 23 September – First English Civil War: Royalist victory at the Battle of Powick Bridge.
- 23 October – First English Civil War: Royalist victory at the Battle of Edgehill, the first pitched battle of the War.
- 29 October – King Charles enters Oxford and establishes his court there.
- 12 November – Battle of Brentford: Royalist forces defeat Parliamentarians.
- 13 November – Battle of Turnham Green: Royalist forces withdraw in face of the Parliamentarian army and fail to take London.
- 1 December – Storming of Farnham Castle: Parliamentarian forces easily take the Surrey stronghold from Royalist defenders.
- The angel is last minted this year.

== Births ==
- 5 March – John Archdale, colonial governor (died 1717)
- 15 March (bapt.) – Laurence Hyde, 1st Earl of Rochester (died 1711)
- 20 June – George Hickes, nonjuring bishop and scholar (died 1715)
- 23 December – John Holt, Lord Chief Justice (died 1710)
- 25 December – Isaac Newton, mathematician and physicist (died 1727)

== Deaths ==
- 7 February – William Bedell, deposed Bishop of Kilmore (born 1571)
- 24 October – Robert Bertie, 1st Earl of Lindsey, Fen drainage adventurer and soldier (born 1583)
- 7 November – Henry Montagu, 1st Earl of Manchester, politician (born c. 1563)
