= Protestation =

The Protestation may mean:

- Protestation of 1621
- Protestation of 1641

See also Protestation Returns of 1642
