= 1721 in Great Britain =

Events from the year 1721 in Great Britain.

== Incumbents ==
- Monarch – George I
- Prime Minister – Robert Walpole (Whig) (starting 3 April)

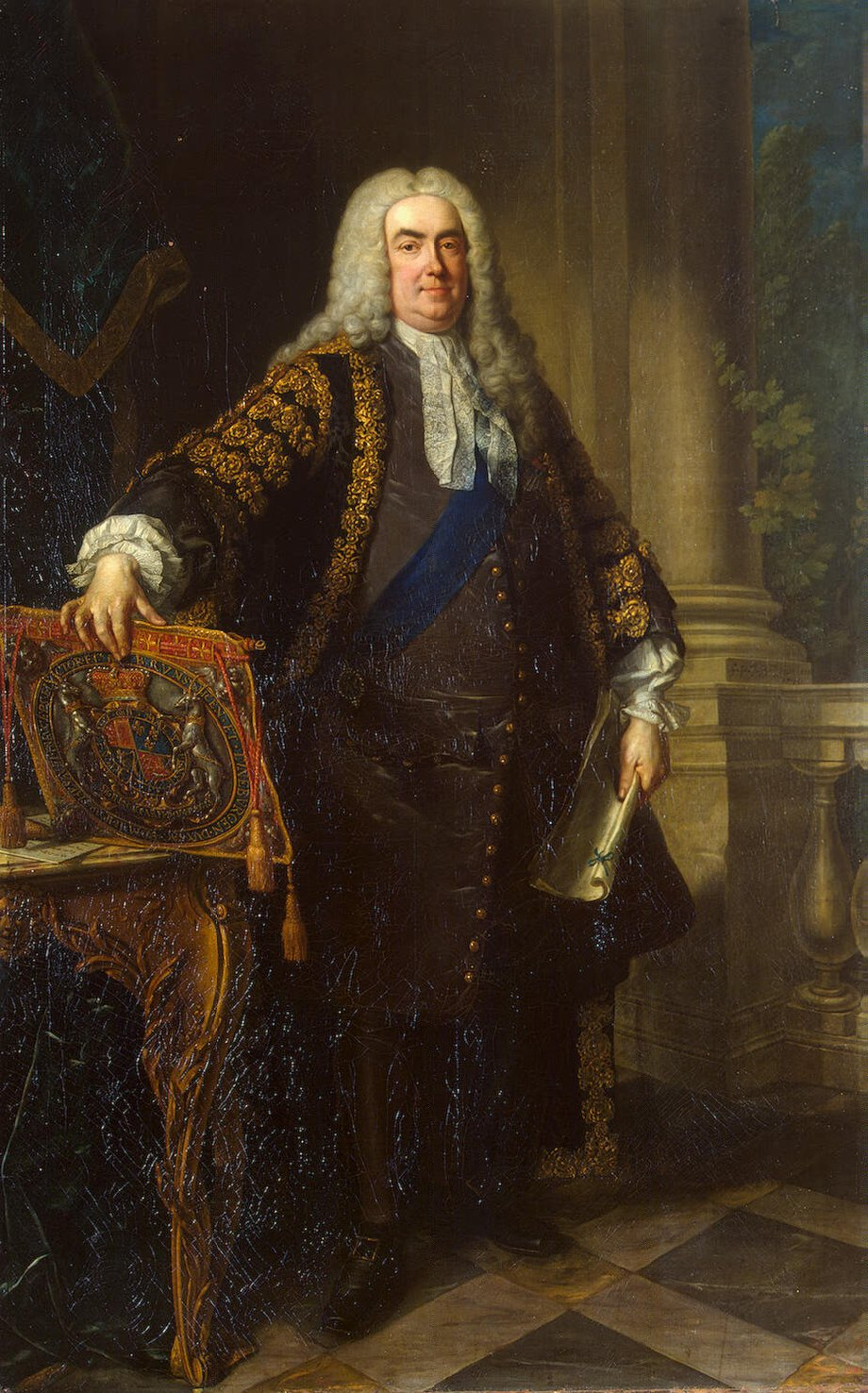
Walpole

== Events ==
- 6 January – The Committee of Inquiry on the collapse of the South Sea Company publishes its findings.
- 5 February – Lord Stanhope, chief minister, dies a day after collapsing while vigorously defending his government's conduct over the "South Sea Bubble" in Parliament.
- 9 March – John Aislabie imprisoned in the Tower of London, found guilty of corruption for his part in the collapse of the South Sea Company as Chancellor of the Exchequer.
- c. March – Atterbury Plot to restore the Stuart monarchy begins.
- 4 April – Robert Walpole becomes the first Prime Minister (although this is more a term of disparagement at this time).

=== Undated ===
- Lady Mary Wortley Montagu introduces smallpox inoculation to Britain: the Princess of Wales is persuaded to test the treatment and the procedure becomes fashionable.
- Thomas Guy founds Guy's Hospital in London.
- Regular mail service between London and New England is established.

== Publications ==
- Nathan Bailey publishes An Universal Etymological English Dictionary.
- Thomas Parnell's A Night-Piece on Death is published, inaugurating the "Graveyard poets" movement.

== Births ==
- 2 January – John Manners, Marquess of Granby (died 1770)
- 8 March – Elizabeth Pierrepont (née Chudleigh), Duchess of Kingston, courtier and adventuress (died 1788 in France)
- 19 March – Tobias Smollett, physician and author (died 1771)
- 15 April – Prince William Augustus, Duke of Cumberland, military leader (died 1765)
- 14 July – John Douglas, Anglican bishop and man of letters (died 1807)
- 4 August – Granville Leveson-Gower, 1st Marquess of Stafford, politician (died 1803)
- 31 August – George Hervey, 2nd Earl of Bristol, statesman (died 1775)
- 9 November – Mark Akenside, poet and physician (died 1770)
- 6 December – James Elphinston, philologist (died 1809)

== Deaths ==
- 27 January – Joshua Churchill, politician
- 5 February – James Stanhope, 1st Earl Stanhope, statesman and soldier (born c. 1673)
- 16 February – James Craggs the Younger, politician (born 1686)
- 24 February – John Sheffield, 1st Duke of Buckingham and Normanby, statesman and poet (born 1648)
- 16 March – James Craggs the Elder, politician (born 1657)
- April – Mary Read, pirate, in Jamaica
- 11 June – Sir Anthony Deane, naval architect and politician (born 1633)
- 8 July – Elihu Yale, East India merchant and educationist (born 1649 in Massachusetts)
- 3 August – Grinling Gibbons, sculptor (born 1648 in Rotterdam)
- 18 September – Matthew Prior, poet and diplomat (born 1664)
- 11 October – Edward Colston, merchant, slave trader and philanthropist (born 1636)
- 13 December – Alexander Selkirk, sailor, at sea (born 1676 in Scotland)
- 17 December – Richard Lumley, 1st Earl of Scarbrough, statesman (born 1650)

== See also ==
- 1721 in Wales
