= Edlyn =

Edlyn may refer to:

- Richard Edlyn
- Edlyn Lewis
