= 1633 in England =

- Centuries: 15th; 16th; 17th; 18th; 19th
- Decades: 1610s; 1620s; 1630s; 1640s; 1650s
- See also: Other events of 1633

Events from the year 1633 in England.

== Incumbents ==
- Monarch – Charles I
- Secretary of State – Sir John Coke
- Lord Chancellor – Thomas Coventry, 1st Baron Coventry

== Events ==
- 13 February – Fire engines are used for the first time in England to control and extinguish a fire that breaks out at London Bridge, but not before 43 houses are destroyed.
- May – King Charles revives medieval forest laws to raise funds from fines.
- 1 August – Exeter School is founded in Devon.
- 6 August – William Laud becomes Archbishop of Canterbury.
- 18 October – Charles I reissues the Declaration of Sports, which had originated during his father's reign, listing the sports and recreations permitted on Sundays and other holy days.
- St Paul's, Covent Garden, designed by Inigo Jones in 1631 overlooking his piazza, opens to worship, the first wholly new parish church built in London since the English Reformation.
- English colonists settle what will become the town of Hingham, Massachusetts.

== Literature ==
- John Ford's play 'Tis Pity She's a Whore published.
- Earliest surviving edition of the Christopher Marlowe play The Jew of Malta published, around 40 years after its first performance.
- John Donne's collected Poems published posthumously.

== Births ==
- 23 February – Samuel Pepys, civil servant and diarist (died 1703)
- 26 March (bapt.) – Mary Beale, portrait painter (died 1699)
- 14 October – King James II of England (died 1701)
- 11 November – George Savile, 1st Marquess of Halifax, writer and statesman (died 1695)
- 3 December (bapt.) – Sir Anthony Deane, naval architect and politician (died 1721)
- Approximate date
  - Thomas Armstrong, politician (executed 1684)
  - Sir Edward Seymour, 4th Baronet, politician (died 1708)

== Deaths ==
- 17 February – Frances Walsingham, noblewoman (born 1567)
- 1 March – George Herbert, poet and orator (born 1593)
- 5 August – George Abbot, Archbishop of Canterbury (born 1562)
- 10 August – Anthony Munday, writer (born 1553)
- 14 November – William Ames, philosopher (born 1576)
