= 1641 in England =

- Centuries: 15th; 16th; 17th; 18th; 19th
- Decades: 1620s; 1630s; 1640s; 1650s; 1660s
- See also: Other events of 1641

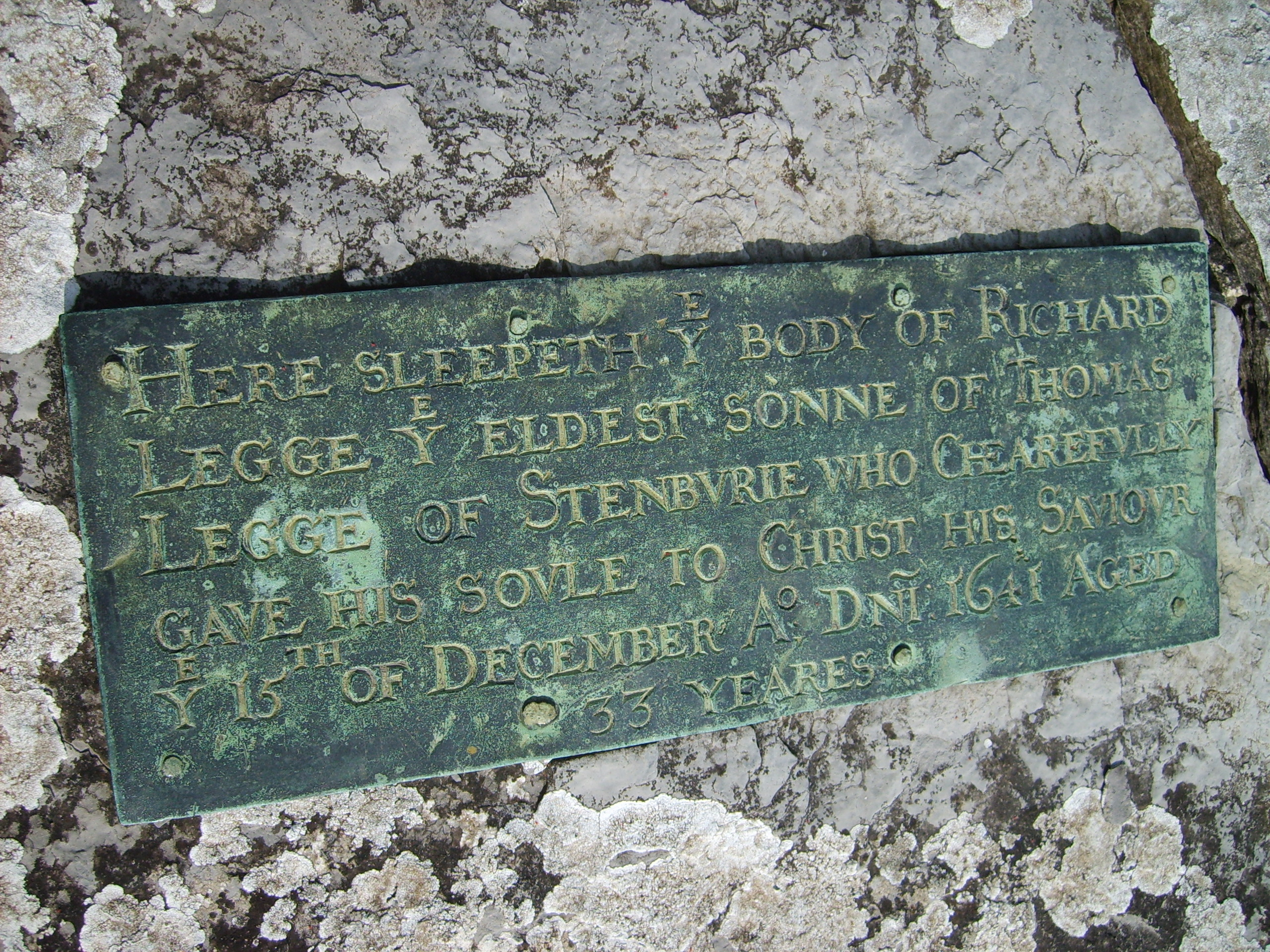

Events from the year 1641 in England.

== Incumbents ==
- Monarch – Charles I

== Events ==
- 23 January – Edward Littleton, 1st Baron Lyttleton of Mounslow appointed Lord Keeper of the Great Seal.
- 29 January – Oliver St John appointed Solicitor General.
- 15 February – the Long Parliament passes the Triennial Act 1640 (16 Cha. 1. c. 1).
- 16 February – the King gives his assent to the Triennial Act, reluctantly committing himself to parliamentary sessions of at least fifty days, every three years.
- 7 March – decree that all Roman Catholic priests must leave England by 7 April or face being arrested and treated as traitors.
- 22 March – the trial for high treason begins for Thomas Wentworth, 1st Earl of Strafford, President of the Council of the North.
- March–May – First Army Plot, an attempt to use the army to support the king against parliament. Playwright William Davenant is convicted of high treason for his part in it and flees to France.
- 7 April – the deadline for Catholic priests to leave England expires. Among those who refuse to leave, Ambrose Barlow and William Ward become martyrs. Barlow surrenders on Easter Sunday, 25 April and is hanged in Lancaster on 10 September; he will be canonized as a saint in 1970. Ward is caught on 15 July and executed in London on 26 July.
- 21 April – the House of Commons votes 204 to 59 in favor of the conviction for treason and the execution of the Earl of Strafford, and the House of Lords acquiesces. King Charles refuses to give the necessary royal assent at this time.
- 2 May – Mary, Princess Royal, 9 year-old eldest daughter of the King, marries 14-year old William II of Orange in the Chapel Royal of Whitehall Palace in London.
- 3 May – the Protestation of 1641 is passed by Parliament, requiring all officeholders to swear an oath of allegiance to the monarch and to the Church of England.
- 7 May – the House of Lords votes, 51 to 9, in favor of the execution of the Earl of Strafford for treason. In fear for his own safety, King Charles I signs Strafford's death warrant on 10 May.
- 11 May – Parliament passes the "Act against Dissolving Parliament without its own Consent".
- 12 May – Thomas Wentworth, 1st Earl of Strafford, former President of the Council of the North, is publicly beheaded in London in front of a crowd of thousands.
- June – Second Army Plot.
- 5 July – Parliament abolishes the Court of High Commission, Star Chamber and the Council of the North.
- 30 July – Parliament declares that any adult male not signing the Protestation of 1641, passed on 3 May, is unfit to hold public office.
- 5 August – London theatres closed because of bubonic plague.
- 7 August – ship money declared illegal by Parliament.
- 10 August – King Charles signs the Treaty of London ending the Bishops' Wars between England and Scotland.
- 21 August – the Scottish Covenanter army leaves Newcastle upon Tyne.
- 23 September – English ship Merchant Royal sinks off Land's End, Cornwall, along with its cargo of 100,000 pounds (45,000 kg) of gold, much silver and coin and 18 of its 58 crew. The treasure will still be sought for in the 2020s.
- 23 October – Irish Rebellion of 1641 breaks out: Irish Catholic gentry, chiefly in Ulster, revolt against the English administration and Scottish settlers in Ireland.
- 12 November – Parliament votes to send an army to Ireland to fight the Irish Rebellion.
- 22 November – the Long Parliament passes, by a vote of 159 to 148, the Grand Remonstrance, with 204 specific objections to King Charles I's absolutist tendencies, and calling for the King to expel all the Anglican bishops from the House of Lords.
- 1 December – the Grand Remonstrance is presented to the King, who makes no response to it until Parliament has the document published and released publicly.
- 7 December – a bill for the Militia Ordinance is introduced by Arthur Haselrig, an anti-monarchist member of the House of Commons, proposing for the first time to allow Parliament to appoint its own military commanders without royal approval. King Charles, concerned that the legislation would allow parliament to create its own army, orders Haselrig arrested for treason. Parliament will pass the Ordinance on 15 March.
- 23 December – King Charles replies to the Grand Remonstrance and refuses the demand for the removal of bishops from the House of Lords. Rioting breaks out in Westminster after the King's refusal is announced, and the 12 Anglican bishops stop attending meetings of the Lords.
- 27 December – the term "roundhead" is first recorded as used to describe supporters of the English Parliament who have challenged the authority of the monarchy: during a riot today, one of the rioters, David Hide, draws his sword and, describing the short haircuts of the anti-monarchists, says that he would "cut the throat of those round-headed dogs that bawled against bishops."
- 30 December – at the request of the King, John Williams, the Anglican Archbishop of York, joins with 11 other bishops in disputing the legality of any legislation passed by the House of Lords during the time that the bishops have been excluded. The House of Commons passes a resolution to have the 12 bishops arrested. King Charles, in turn, issues an order on 3 January 1642 to have five members of the House of Commons arrested for treason.
- First publication of the supposed prophecies of Yorkshire soothsayer Mother Shipton (died 1561), The prophesie of Mother Shipton in the raigne of King Henry the eighth (London).

== Births ==
- 8 February – Robert Knox, sea captain in the service of the British East India Company (died 1720)
- 15 March (bapt.) – Laurence Hyde, 1st Earl of Rochester, politician and writer (died 1711)
- 4 April – Sir James Oxenden, 2nd Baronet, politician (died 1708)
- 8 April
  - Henry Sydney, 1st Earl of Romney, statesman and army officer (died 1704)
  - (bapt.) – William Wycherley, playwright (died 1716)
- 16 May – Dudley North, economist, merchant and politician (died 1691)
- 14 July – William Boynton, politician (died 1689)
- 29 July – Sir William Thomas, 1st Baronet, Member of Parliament (died 1706)
- 2 August – Jacob Bobart the Younger, botanist (died 1719)
- 5 September – Robert Spencer, 2nd Earl of Sunderland, diplomat (died 1702)
- 26 September – Nehemiah Grew, plant anatomist and physiologist (died 1712)
- 6 October – Sir William Maynard, 1st Baronet, politician (died 1685)
- 28 October – Sir Philip Skippon, traveller, naturalist and Member of Parliament (died 1691)
- 10 November – Edward Lake, clergyman (died 1704)

== Deaths ==
- 3 January – Jeremiah Horrocks, astronomer (born c. 1618)
- 6 April (bur.) – Thomas Nabbes, dramatist (born 1605)
- 13 April – Richard Montagu, clergyman (born 1577)
- 12 May – Thomas Wentworth, Earl of Strafford, statesman, executed (born 1593)
- 5 July – Sir Simon Baskerville, royal physician (born 1574)
- 21 July – Thomas Mun, economist (born 1571)
- 26 July – William Ward, Catholic priest, executed (born c. 1560)
- 9 August – Augustine Baker, Welsh-born Benedictine mystic and ascetic writer, of plague (born 1575)
- 16 August – Thomas Heywood, playwright, actor, poet and author (born c. 1554)
- 10 September – Ambrose Barlow, Catholic priest, executed (born 1585)
- 11 November – Christopher Clitherow, merchant, Lord Mayor of London and Member of Parliament (born 1578)
- 28 November – Robert Dowland, lutenist (born c. 1591)
- 3 December – John Percy, Jesuit priest (born 1569)
- 9 December – Sir Anthony van Dyck, Flemish-born court painter (born 1599)
