= 1631 in England =

- Centuries: 15th; 16th; 17th; 18th; 19th
- Decades: 1610s; 1620s; 1630s; 1640s; 1650s
- See also: Other events of 1631

Events from the year 1631 in England.

== Incumbents ==
- Monarch – Charles I
- Lord Chancellor – Thomas Coventry, 1st Baron Coventry

== Events ==
- 5 February – Puritan minister and theologian Roger Williams emigrates to Boston in the Massachusetts Bay Colony.
- 20 February – A fire breaks out in Westminster Hall, but is put out before it can cause serious destruction.
- 14 May – Mervyn Tuchet, 2nd Earl of Castlehaven, is beheaded on Tower Hill, London, and attainted for sodomy and for assisting in the rape of his wife following a leading case which admits the right of a spouse claiming to be injured to testify against her husband.
- 28 May – William Claiborne sails from England to establish a trading post on Kent Island, the first English settlement in Maryland.
- December – The Holland's Leguer, a notorious brothel in Southwark (London), is ordered closed and besieged for a month before this can be carried out.
- Poor harvest for second year in a row causes widespread social unrest.
- Worshipful Company of Clockmakers established in London.
- Publication of the "Wicked Bible" by Robert Barker and Martin Lucas, the royal printers in London, an edition of the King James Version of the Bible in which a typesetting erratum leaves the seventh of the Ten Commandments (Exodus 20:14) with the word not omitted from the sentence "Thou shalt not commit adultery". Copies are withdrawn and about a year later the publishers are called to the Star Chamber, fined £300 and have their licence to print revoked.
- William Oughtred publishes Clavis Mathematicae, introducing the multiplication sign (×) and proportion sign (::).
- Thomas Hobbes is employed as a tutor by the Cavendish family, to teach the future Earl of Devonshire.

== Arts and literature ==
- 9 January – The masque Love's Triumph Through Callipolis, written by Ben Jonson with music by Nicholas Lanier and designed by Inigo Jones, is performed at Whitehall Palace.
- 11 January – The Master of the Revels refuses to license Philip Massinger's new play, Believe as You List, because of its seditious content; it is first performed in a revised version on 7 May.

== Births ==
- 1 January – Katherine Philips, poet (died 1664)
- 6 February – Edward Abney, politician (died 1727)
- 20 February – Thomas Osborne, 1st Duke of Leeds, statesman (died 1712)
- 15 April – Walter Vincent, English politician (died 1680)
- 29 April – Joseph Bridger, Colonial Governor of Virginia (died 1686)
- 4 May – William Brereton, 3rd Baron Brereton, politician (died 1680)
- 29 May – Robert Paston, 1st Earl of Yarmouth, politician (died 1683)
- 4 July – John Roettiers, engraver (died 1703)
- 15 July – Richard Cumberland, philosopher (died 1718)
- 7 August – Nicholas Tufton, 3rd Earl of Thanet, (died 1679)
- 19 August – John Dryden, writer (died 1700)
- 24 August – Philip Henry, nonconformist minister (died 1696)
- 6 September – Charles Porter, Lord Chancellor of Ireland (died 1696)
- 29 September – Richard Edlin, astrologer (died 1677)
- 12 October – George Saunderson, 5th Viscount Castleton, politician (died 1714)
- 13 October – Richard Hampden, politician (died 1695)
- 18 October – Michael Wigglesworth, Puritan minister, doctor and poet in New England (died 1705)
- 4 November – Mary, Princess Royal and Princess of Orange (died 1660)
- 10 November – Daniel Harvey, merchant, diplomat and politician (died 1672)
- 14 December – Lady Anne Finch Conway, philosopher (died 1679)
- John Barret, Presbyterian minister and religious controversialist (died 1713)
- Arthur Capell, 1st Earl of Essex, statesman, implicated in Rye House Plot (suicide 1683)
- Joan Dant, Quaker merchant and philanthropist (died 1715)
- Richard Lower, physician who performs the first direct blood transfusion (died 1691)
- John Phillips, satirist (died 1706)
- approx. date – William Ball, astronomer (died 1690)

== Deaths ==
- 1 January – Thomas Hobson, carrier and origin of the phrase "Hobson's choice" (born 1544)
- 7 February – Gabriel Harvey, writer (born c. 1552)
- 31 March – John Donne, poet and Dean of St Paul's (born 1572)
- 6 May – Sir Robert Cotton, 1st Baronet, of Connington, politician and antiquarian (born 1571)
- 25 May – Samuel Harsnett, Archbishop of York and religious writer (born 1561)
- 18 June – Sir Robert Payne, politician (born 1573)
- 21 June – John Smith, soldier and colonist (born 1580)
- 28 October – Sir Richard Beaumont, 1st Baronet, politician (born 1574)
- 23 December – Michael Drayton, poet (born 1563)
