= 1636 in England =

- Centuries: 15th; 16th; 17th; 18th; 19th
- Decades: 1610s; 1620s; 1630s; 1640s; 1650s
- See also: Other events of 1636

Events from the year 1636 in England.

== Incumbents ==
- Monarch – Charles I
- Secretary of State – Sir John Coke

== Events ==
- 3 March – A "great charter" to the University of Oxford establishes the Oxford University Press as the second of the privileged presses.
- 8 September – New College founded at the English colony of Massachusetts; later renamed 'Harvard'.
- 9 October – John Hampden refuses to pay ship money after a third writ is issued.
- Unknown – Completion of excavation of Old Bedford River (begun in 1630).
- Unknown – Roger Williams founds the new English colony Rhode Island in North America
- Unknown – Construction concluded on the Jacobean mansion Crewe Hall

== Births ==
- 29 June – Thomas Hyde, orientalist (died 1703)
- 29 September – Thomas Tenison, Archbishop of Canterbury (died 1715)
- 7 October – Edward Wetenhall, bishop (died 1713)
- 1 December – Elizabeth Capell, Countess of Essex, noblewoman (died 1718)
- 27 December – John Dormer, born Huddleston, Jesuit priest (died 1700)

== Deaths ==
- 20 March – Thomas Puckering, politician (born 1592)
- 18 April – Julius Caesar, judge (born c. 1557)
- 29 May – William Pitt, politician (born 1559)
- 15 August – Robert Hitcham, lawyer and politician (born 1572)
