= 1635 in England =

- Centuries: 15th; 16th; 17th; 18th; 19th
- Decades: 1610s; 1620s; 1630s; 1640s; 1650s
- See also: Other events of 1635

Events from the year 1635 in England.

== Incumbents ==
- Monarch – Charles I
- Secretary of State – Sir John Coke
- Lord Chancellor – Thomas Coventry, 1st Baron Coventry

== Events ==
- April – Construction is completed on the Jacobean mansion Aston Hall
- 4 August – second writ for ship money is issued, extending the payments to inland towns.
- Peter Paul Rubens paints the ceiling of the Banqueting House, Whitehall.
- First secondary school established in the North American colonies, the English High and Latin School at Boston.
- First General Post Office opens to the public, at Bishopsgate, London.
- English settlers begin the colonisation of Connecticut.

== Literature ==
- The stage tragedy Hannibal and Scipio by Thomas Nabbes is first performed by Queen Henrietta's Men

== Births ==
- 18 July – Robert Hooke, scientist (died 1703)
- 22 November – Francis Willughby, biologist (died 1672)
- 28 December – Princess Elizabeth of England (died 1650)
- 31 December – Sir Robert Southwell, diplomat and politician (died 1702)
- Approximate date – Catherine Pegge, royal mistress

== Deaths ==
- 12 January – Anne Cornwallis, benefactor (born 1590)
- March – Thomas Randolph, poet (born 1605)
- 27 March – Robert Naunton, politician (born 1563)
- 25 November – John Hall, physician and son-in-law of William Shakespeare (born 1575)
