= 1634 in England =

- Centuries: 15th; 16th; 17th; 18th; 19th
- Decades: 1610s; 1620s; 1630s; 1640s; 1650s
- See also: Other events of 1634

Events from the year 1634 in England.

== Incumbents ==
- Monarch – Charles I
- Secretary of State – Sir John Coke
- Lord Chancellor – Thomas Coventry, 1st Baron Coventry

== Events ==
- March – Leonard Calvert leads the first group of settlers to the new English colony of Maryland in North America
- 5 May – A royal proclamation confines flying of the Union Flag (the first recorded reference to it by this name) to the king's ships; English merchant vessels are to fly the flag of England.
- 7 May – William Prynne is sentenced by the Star Chamber to a £5,000 fine, life imprisonment, pillorying and the loss of part of his ears when his Histriomastix is viewed as an attack on King Charles I and Queen Henrietta Maria
- 20 October – King Charles I issues writs to raise ship money from coastal ports to finance the Royal Navy

=== Undated ===
- Cornelius Vermuyden begins the draining of The Fens to reclaim farmland
- First Newmarket Gold Cup horse race
- Thomas Johnson begins publishing Mercurius Botanicus, including a list of indigenous British plants.
- The position of Keeper of the Archives is established at the University of Oxford
- The English establish a settlement at Cochin (modern-day Kochi) on the Malabar Coast

== Literature ==
- 22 January – William Davenant's comedy The Wits first performed by the King's Men at the Blackfriars Theatre
- John Ford's history play Perkin Warbeck published.

== Births ==
- 1 January – Fleetwood Sheppard, poet (died 1698)
- 7 February – Robert Robartes, Viscount Bodmin, diplomat and politician (died 1682)
- 23 March – Philip Smythe, 2nd Viscount Strangford, Member of Parliament (died 1708)
- 25 March – George Bull, bishop of St Davids and theologian (died 1710)
- 28 March – Sir Richard Temple, 3rd Baronet, Member of Parliament (died 1697)
- 8 April – Joseph Alleine, nonconformist pastor, author (died 1668)
- 14 April – Sir John Reresby, 2nd Baronet, politician and diarist (died 1689)
- 25 April – Robert Montagu, 3rd Earl of Manchester, politician (died 1683)
- 4 May – Lady Katherine Ferrers, aristocrat and heiress (died 1660)
- 7 May – Richard Legh, politician (died 1687)
- 14 June – Nathaniel Bond, politician (died 1707)
- 23 July – Sir John Hoskyns, 2nd Baronet, politician (died 1705)
- 4 September – Robert South, churchman known for combative preaching (died 1716)
- 6 September – Thomas Tryon, hatmaker (died 1703)
- 7 November – Francis Winnington, Solicitor-General (died 1700)
- 23 November – Paulet St John, 3rd Earl of Bolingbroke, politician (died 1711)
- 25 November – Richard Slater, politician (died 1699)
- Unknown – Roger Palmer, 1st Earl of Castlemaine, diplomat (died 1705)

== Deaths ==
- 23 March – Elizabeth Finch, 1st Countess of Winchilsea, noblewoman (born 1556)
- 12 May – George Chapman, author (born c. 1559)
- 25 June – John Marston, dramatist (born 1576)
- 9 August – William Noy, jurist (born 1577)
- 3 September – Edward Coke, colonial entrepreneur and jurist (born 1552)
- 25 December – Lettice Knollys, noblewoman (born 1543)
