= 1638 in England =

- Centuries: 15th; 16th; 17th; 18th; 19th
- Decades: 1610s; 1620s; 1630s; 1640s; 1650s
- See also: Other events of 1638

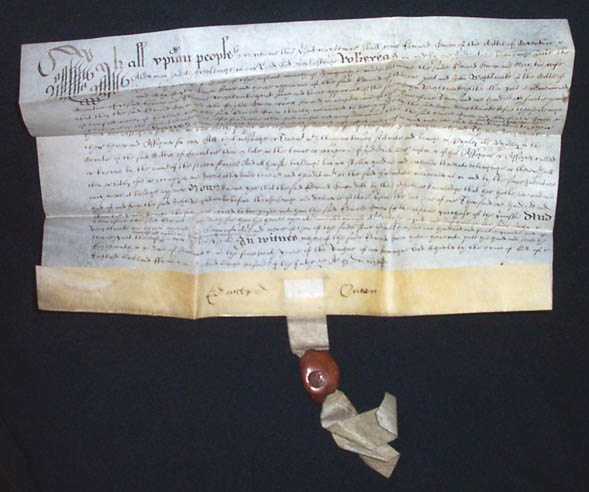
English deed from the year 1968

Events from the year 1638 in England.

== Incumbents ==
- Monarch – Charles I
- Secretary of State – Sir John Coke

== Events ==
- 18 April – flogging of John Lilburne for refusing to swear an oath when brought before the court of Star Chamber for distributing Puritan publications.
- 12 June – trial of John Hampden for non-payment of ship money concludes: a narrow majority of judges find the tax to be legal.
- 21 October – The Great Thunderstorm at Widecombe-in-the-Moor in Devon: 4 are killed and around 60 injured when probable ball lightning strikes the parish church.
- The Queen's House at Greenwich, designed by Inigo Jones in 1616 as the first major example of classical architecture in the country, is completed for Henrietta Maria.
- John Milton's elegy "Lycidas" is published.

== Births ==
- 24 January – Charles Sackville, 6th Earl of Dorset, poet and courtier (died 1706)
- 6 March– Henry Capell, 1st Baron Capell, First Lord of the British Admiralty (died 1696)
- 2 June – Henry Hyde, 2nd Earl of Clarendon, politician (died 1709)
- 24 December – Ralph Montagu, 1st Duke of Montagu, diplomat (died 1709)
- William Sacheverell, statesman (died 1691)

== Deaths ==
- 14 September – John Harvard, clergyman and colonist (born 1607)
