= Vow and covenant (English Civil War) =

1643 act of solidarity against Charles I

The Vow and covenant was an act of solidarity taken by members of the House of Commons of England (7 June 1643) and the House of Lords (9 June 1643) demonstrating Parliament's unified opposition to Charles I and willingness to prosecute the war with the King. The Vow and Covenant also demonstrates the level of personal religious devotion professed by the members of the Long Parliament at this time.

The Vow and Covenant asserts there is "a Popish and traiterous [sic] Plot for the Subversion of the true Protestant Reformed Religion" whereby the Parliament's forces are to be surprised and overthrown, leading to the end of liberty and the "Protestant Religion". In response to this the members of Parliament make a Vow to devote their every effort and all their resources to the opposition of the King and his "Popish" purposes. The Vow also includes a personal statement of repentance and faith.

== See also ==
- Solemn League and Covenant
- Protestation Returns of 1641–1642
