= 1765 in Great Britain =

Events from the year 1765 in Great Britain.

== Incumbents ==
- Monarch – George III
- Prime Minister – George Grenville (Whig) (until 13 July); Charles Watson-Wentworth, 2nd Marquess of Rockingham (Whig) (starting 13 July)

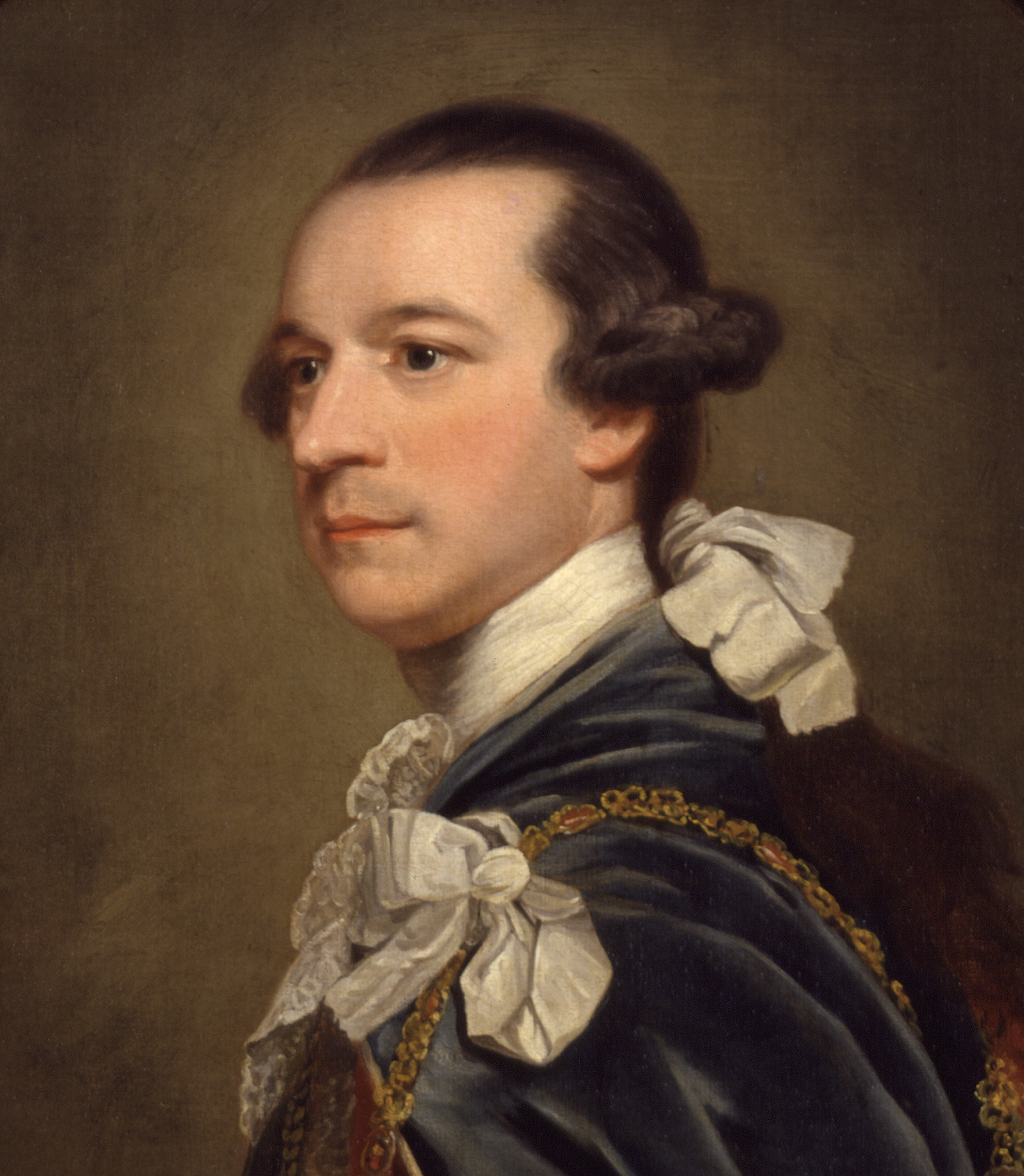
Charles Watson-Wentworth, 2nd Marquess of Rockingham

== Events ==
- January–April – George III suffers a malady, perhaps a first manifestation of bipolar disorder.
- 8 February – Nevil Maskelyne becomes Astronomer Royal.
- 22 March – Parliament passes the Stamp Act which is the first direct tax levied on the American colonies.
- 24 March – Parliament passes the Quartering Act that requires the 13 American colonies to house British troops.
- 7 May – HMS Victory is launched at Chatham Dockyard; at the beginning of the 21st century it remains the oldest naval ship still in commission.
- May – James Watt makes a breakthrough in the development of the steam engine by constructing a model with a separate condenser.
- 21 June – the Isle of Man is brought under British control, the Isle of Man Purchase Act (coming into force 10 May) confirming HM Treasury's purchase of the feudal rights of the Dukes of Atholl as Lord of Mann over the island and revesting them into the British Crown.
- 12 July – George Grenville is dismissed as Prime Minister by King George III.
- 13 July – Charles Watson-Wentworth, 2nd Marquess of Rockingham succeeds Grenville as Prime Minister.
- 7 August – armed mutiny at Maidstone County Gaol.
- 12 August – Robert Clive secures the rights for the East India Company to collect taxes in Bengal from Mughal Emperor Shah Alam II.
- 2 November – the decision of the King's Bench in Entick v Carrington establishes the civil liberties of individuals and limiting the scope of executive power.

=== Undated ===
- Lord Mansfield decides the landmark case of Pillans v Van Mierop in English contract law in relation to the doctrine of consideration.
- Taylors & Lloyds Bank established in Birmingham.
- Kedleston Hall in Derbyshire completed.
- William Tryon appointed Governor of North Carolina.

== Publications ==
- William Blackstone's influential work Commentaries on the Laws of England begins publication.
- Thomas Percy's ballad collection Reliques of Ancient English Poetry.
- The History of Little Goody Two-Shoes, an anonymous children's story published by John Newbery.
- Mother Goose's Melody, or, Sonnets for the Cradle, a collection of nursery rhymes published by John Newbery (approximate date).

== Births ==
- 2 January – Charles Hatchett, chemist (died 1847)
- 13 January – Richard Westall, painter (died 1836)
- 26 April – Emma, Lady Hamilton, born Amy Lyon, mistress of Horatio Nelson (died 1815 in France)
- 15 June – Henry Thomas Colebrooke, orientalist (died 1837)
- 27 July – John Marshall, textile manufacturer (died 1845)
- 21 August – King William IV (died 1837)
- 24 October – James Mackintosh, Scottish-born journalist, judge, administrator, professor, philosopher and Whig politician (died 1832)
- 20 November – Thomas Fremantle, admiral and politician (died 1819)
- Approximate date – James Smithson, chemist, mineralogist and posthumous founder of the Smithsonian Institution in the United States, born in France (died 1829 in Italy)

== Deaths ==
- 3 March – William Stukeley, archaeologist (born 1687)
- 5 April – Edward Young, poet (born 1683)
- 10 October – Lionel Sackville, 1st Duke of Dorset, Lord Lieutenant of Ireland (born 1688)
- 31 October – Prince William, Duke of Cumberland, military leader (born 1721)
- 30 November – George Glas, merchant and adventurer (born 1725)
- 3 December – Lord John Philip Sackville, cricketer (born 1713)

== See also ==
- 1765 in Wales
