= 1639 in England =

- Centuries: 15th; 16th; 17th; 18th; 19th
- Decades: 1610s; 1620s; 1630s; 1640s; 1650s
- See also: Other events of 1639

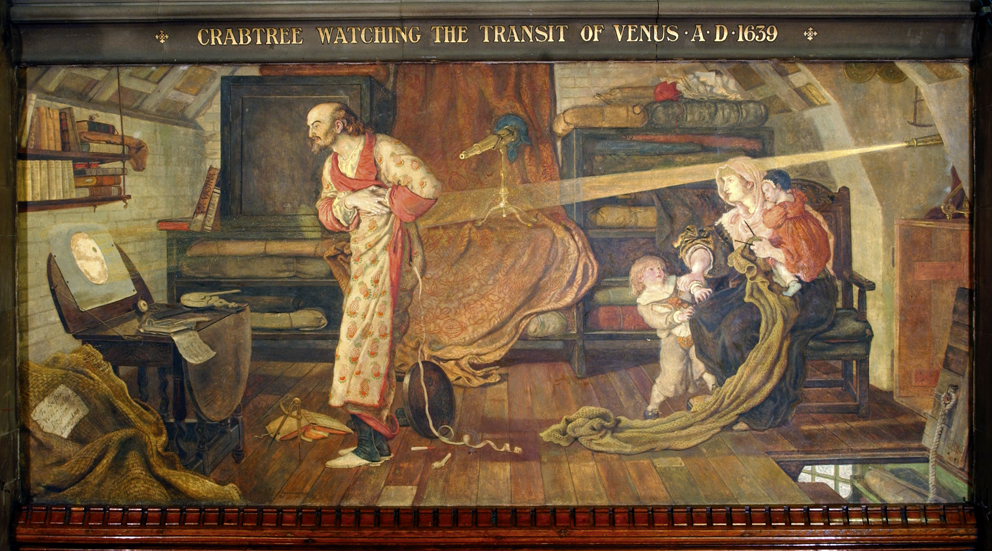
The Transit of Venus in 1639

Events from the year 1639 in England.

== Incumbents ==
- Monarch – Charles I
- Secretary of State – Sir John Coke

== Events ==
- 26 January – King Charles I raises (with difficulty) an army and begins to march north to fight the Scottish Covenanters in the First Bishops' War, opening the Wars of the Three Kingdoms.
- 27 February – Charles denounces the Covenanters.
- 21 April – William Fiennes, 1st Viscount Saye and Sele and Robert Greville, 2nd Baron Brooke imprisoned for refusing to fight against the Covenanters.
- 25 April – Charles issues a proclamation promising to pardon rebels.
- 14 May – Charles issues a further proclamation promising to settle the Covenanters' grievances and not to invade Scotland.
- 19 June – Treaty of Berwick signed between the King and the Covenanters, ending the First Bishops' War.
- 15 September – Battle of the Downs between the Dutch and Spanish in English waters.
- 24 November (4 December in Gregorian calendar) – Lancashire astronomers Jeremiah Horrocks and William Crabtree are the first and only scientific observers of a transit of Venus, predicted by Horrocks.

== Births ==
- 7 March – Charles Stewart, 3rd Duke of Richmond (died 1672)
- c. April – Martin Lister, naturalist and physician (died 1712)
- 8 July – Henry Stuart, Duke of Gloucester (died 1660)
- 29 September – Lord William Russell, politician (executed 1683)

== Deaths ==
- January – Shackerley Marmion, dramatist (born 1603)
- 7 November – Thomas Arundell, 1st Baron Arundell of Wardour, politician (born c. 1560)
- possible – John Ford, dramatist and poet (born 1586)
