= 1632 in England =

- Centuries: 15th; 16th; 17th; 18th; 19th
- Decades: 1610s; 1620s; 1630s; 1640s; 1650s
- See also: Other events of 1632

Events from the year 1632 in England.

== Incumbents ==
- Monarch – Charles I
- Lord Chancellor – Thomas Coventry, 1st Baron Coventry

== Events ==
- 29 March – The Treaty of Saint-Germain-en-Laye is signed in which England agrees to return all of New France to French control.
- 15 June – Sir Francis Windebank is made chief Secretary of State.
- 20 June – A royal charter was issued for the foundation of the Maryland colony in North America. Lord Baltimore appointed as the first governor.
- July – portraitist Anthony van Dyck, newly returned to London, is knighted and granted a pension as principalle Paynter in ordinary to their majesties.
- 17 October – the court of Star Chamber prohibits all "news books" because of complaints from Spanish and Austrian diplomats that coverage in England of the Thirty Years' War is unfair.

== Literature ==
- The Second Folio of William Shakespeare's plays published.
- Publication of William Prynne's Histriomastix, an attack on the English Renaissance theatre.

== Births ==
- 13 March – John Houblon, first Governor of the Bank of England (died 1712)
- 29 August – John Locke, philosopher (died 1704)
- 20 October – Christopher Wren, architect, astronomer and mathematician (died 1723)
- 17 December – Anthony Wood, antiquarian (died 1695)

== Deaths ==
- 26 March – Sir John Leman, merchant, landowner, Lord Mayor of London and benefactor (born 1544)
- 22 June – James Whitelocke, judge (born 1570)
- 23 August – Frances Carr, Countess of Somerset, noblewoman complicit in murder (born 1590)
- 25 August – Thomas Dekker, dramatist (born c. 1572)
- 5 November – Henry Percy, 9th Earl of Northumberland, nobleman, Catholic sympathiser and scientist (born 1564)
- 27 November – John Eliot, statesman (born 1592)
