= Protestation of 1621 =

Declaration by the House of Commons of England

The Protestation of 1621 was a declaration by the House of Commons of England reaffirming their right to freedom of speech in the face of King James I's belief that they had no right to debate foreign policy.

Many Members of Parliament were unhappy with James' foreign policy. They opposed the Spanish Match (the plan to marry Charles, Prince of Wales to the Spanish Infanta) and wished for a war against Spain. The MPs believed that if they conceded that they had no right to debate matters which displeased the King, Parliament would be obsolete. As William Hakewill MP and historian stated: "The privileges of this House are the flowers of the Crown, and we shall never sit here again if they are not maintained". The Commons declared on 18 December 1621:

The commons now assembled in parliament, being justly occasioned thereunto, concerning sundry liberties, franchises, privileges, and jurisdictions of parliament, amongst others not herein mentioned, do make this protestation following:—That the liberties, franchises, privileges, and jurisdictions of parliament are the ancient and undoubted birthright and inheritance of the subjects of England; and that the arduous and urgent affairs concerning the king, state, and the defence of the realm, and of the church of England, and the making and maintenance of laws, and redress of mischiefs, and grievances which daily happen within this realm, are proper subjects and matter of counsel and debate in parliament; and that in the handling and proceeding of those businesses, every member of the house hath, and of right ought to have, freedom of speech to propound, treat, reason, and bring to conclusion the same: that the commons in parliament have like liberty and freedom to treat of those matters, in such order as in their judgments shall seem fittest: and that every such member of the said house hath like freedom from all impeachment, imprisonment, and molestation (other than, by the censure of the house itself), for or concerning any bill, speaking, reasoning, or declaring of any matter or matters, touching the parliament or parliament business; and that, if any of the said members be complained of, and questioned for any thing said or done in parliament, the same is to be showed to the king, by the advice and assent of all the commons assembled in parliament, before the king give credence to any private information.

James formally deleted the Protestation from the Journals of Parliament and dissolved Parliament.
