= 1708 in Great Britain =

Events from the year 1708 in Great Britain.

== Incumbents ==
- Monarch – Anne

== Events ==
- 26 February – HMS Falmouth, a 50-gun fourth-rate ship of the line built at Woolwich Dockyard for the Royal Navy, is launched.
- 13 February – Robert Harley is dismissed from his position as Secretary of State for the Northern Department and Robert Walpole becomes Secretary at War.
- 11 March – Queen Anne withholds Royal Assent from the Scottish Militia Bill, the last time a British monarch vetoes legislation at home. This is on the advice of her ministers, who are having second thoughts about the potential loyalty of a militia with a Jacobite-French invasion fleet assembled.
- 23 March – planned French invasion of Britain: James Francis Edward Stuart unsuccessfully tries to land at the Firth of Forth with a French fleet.
- 30 April–7 July – general election held to return members to serve in the House of Commons of the second Parliament of Great Britain, the first after the merger of the Parliaments of England and Scotland in 1707. The election results in a victory for the Whigs.
- 1 May – the Privy Councils of England and Scotland are merged into the Privy Council of Great Britain.
- 8 June – War of the Spanish Succession: Wager's Action, a naval confrontation, takes place between a British squadron under Charles Wager and the Spanish treasure fleet off Cartagena in the Caribbean Sea. Spanish galleon San José explodes and sinks with the loss of almost all her 600 crew and an estimated 8.8 million ounces troy weight in gold; her wreck is located in 2015.
- 11 July – War of the Spanish Succession: allied victory under the commander John Churchill, 1st Duke of Marlborough against the French at the Battle of Oudenarde in the Spanish Netherlands.
- 14 July – Joseph Trapp becomes first Oxford Professor of Poetry.
- 28 July – The second Eddystone Lighthouse, erected by John Rudyerd, is first illuminated.
- 18 August – War of the Spanish Succession: Capture of Menorca by British forces.
- 23 August – Queen Anne attends a thanksgiving service at the new St Paul's Cathedral in London for victory at the Battle of Oudenarde. She quarrels publicly with Sarah Churchill, Duchess of Marlborough; and loose bolts in the supporting beams above her – in fact, the result of poor workmanship – are interpreted by the opposition as the "Screw Plot", a Whig assassination attempt.
- 12 October – War of the Spanish Succession: British forces capture Lille after a two-month siege, although the citadel continues to hold out for another six weeks.
- 26 October – topping out of the new St Paul's Cathedral in London.

=== Undated ===
- Wilbury House in Wiltshire, designed by William Benson, is completed.
- Edward Lhuyd becomes a Fellow of the Royal Society.
- The Parliament of Great Britain passes an act prohibiting the British government from accepting plunder taken by privateers.
- Merger (with consent of Parliament) of the Company of Merchants of London Trading into the East Indies and the more recently established English Company Trading to the East Indies to form the United Company of Merchants of England Trading to the East Indies, known as the Honourable East India Company.

== Publications ==
=== Prose ===
- Joseph Addison, The Present State of the War (pro-Marlborough tract)
- Edmund Arwaker, Truth in Fiction (fables)
- Francis Atterbury, Fourteen Sermons Preach'd on Several Occasions
- Joseph Bingham, Origines Ecclesiasticae, or Antiquities of the Christian Church, vol. 1
- Richard Blackmore, The Kit-Cats
- Jeremy Collier, An Ecclesiastical History of Great Britain, Chiefly of England, vol. 1
- Anthony Ashley Cooper, 3rd Earl of Shaftesbury, A Letter Concerning Enthusiasm (contra radical Protestantism)
- Edmund Curll, The Charitable Surgeon
- John Downes – Roscius Anglicanus (a historical review of the stage)
- John Fisher, Cardinal Bishop of Rochester (executed 1535) – Funeral Sermon for Margaret, Countess of Richmond and Derby (originally delivered 1509; published with an anonymous preface by Thomas Baker)
- Charles Gildon
  - Libertas Triumphans (re Battle of Oudenarde)
  - The New Metamorphosis (fiction)
- John Harris, Lexicon Technicum: Or, A Universal English Dictionary of Arts and Sciences, vol. 1 (second edition)
- Aaron Hill, The Celebrated Speeches of Ajax and Ulysses, for the Armour of Achilles (from Ovid)
- Benjamin Hoadly, The Unhappiness of the Present Establishment, and the Unhappiness of Absolute Monarchy
- John Locke (died 1704), Some Familiar Letters
- Simon Ockley, The Conquest of Syria, Persia, and Aegypt by the Saracens (vol. 1 of History of the Saracens)
- Jonathan Swift:
  - Predictions for the Year 1708
  - The Accomplishment of the First of Mr. Bickerstaff's Predictions (together, part of the "Bickerstaff Papers")
  - An Argument against Abolishing Christianity

=== Poetry and songs ===
- Edmund Arwaker, Truth in Fiction; or, Morality in Masquerade
- Sir Richard Blackmore, The Kit-Cats
- Elijah Fenton, Oxford and Cambridge Miscellany Poems
- John Gay, Wine, published anonymously
- Charles Gildon, Libertas Triumphans, on the battle of Oudenarde, July 11
- Aaron Hill, The Celebrated Speeches of Ajax and Ulysses for the Armour of Achilles, published anonymously, translated from Ovid's Metamorphoses
- William King, The Art of Cookery
- Matthew Prior, Poems on Several Occasions, published this year, although the book states "1709"
- Isaac Watts, Hymns and Spiritual Songs

== Births ==
- 7 January – George Stone, Archbishop of Armagh (Church of Ireland) (died 1764)
- 26 January – William Hayes, composer (died 1777)
- 15 March – John Hulse, Anglican cleric (died 1790)
- 13 July – Richard Robinson, 1st Baron Rokeby, Archbishop of Armagh (Church of Ireland) and benefactor (died 1794)
- 15 November – William Pitt, 1st Earl of Chatham ("the Elder"), Prime Minister (died 1778)
- 8 December – Charles Hanbury Williams, Welsh-born diplomat and satirical poet (died 1759)
- 18 December – John Collier, caricaturist and satirical poet ("Tim Bobbin") (died 1786)
- Richard Dawes, classical scholar (died 1766)
- Lavinia Fenton, actress (died 1760)
- Francis Hayman, painter and illustrator (died 1776)
- Elizabeth Scott, hymnwriter (died 1776 in the United States)
- Thomas Seward, poet (died 1790)

== Deaths ==
- 24 February (bur.) – Moll Davis, entertainer and courtesan, a mistress of King Charles II (born c. 1648)
- 4 March – Thomas Ward, exiled Catholic convert and controversialist (born 1652)
- 5 March – William Beveridge, Bishop of St. Asaph (born 1637)
- 15 March – William Walsh, poet, critic and politician (born 1662)
- 20 March (bur.) – "Father" Bernard Smith, organ builder (born c. 1630 in Germany)
- 29 March – John Partridge, astrologer and almanack-maker (born 1644)
- 20 April – Damaris Cudworth Masham, philosopher (born 1659)
- 21 June – John Hamilton, 2nd Lord Belhaven and Stenton, Scottish politician (born 1656)
- 10 July – James Kendall, soldier and politician (born 1647)
- 1 August – Edward Tyson, comparative anatomist (born 1651)
- 6 September – John Morden, merchant and philanthropist (born 1623)
- 19 September – Francis Newport, 1st Earl of Bradford, politician (born 1620)
- 29 September – Sir James Oxenden, 2nd Baronet, politician (born 1641)
- 1 October – John Blow, composer (born 1649)
- 10 October – David Gregory, Scottish astronomer (born 1659)
- 28 October – Prince George of Denmark, consort of Queen Anne (born 1653 in Denmark)
- 31 October – Nathaniel Higginson, politician (born 1652)
- 15 November – Gregory Hascard, pluralist cleric
- 17 December – Deborah Churchill, career criminal (hanged) (born c. 1677)
