= Edmund Arwaker =

Irish Anglican cleric

Edmund Arwaker was Archdeacon of Armagh from 1691 until 1693.

Arwaker was born in Kilkenny and educated at Trinity College, Dublin. He was Chaplain to the Duke of Ormond; Canon of Kildare from 1681 to 1686; and held livings at Drumglass and Killyman.
