= John Dormer (Jesuit) =

John Dormer (1636–1700) was an English Jesuit.

== Life ==
Dormer, whose real name was Huddleston, was a son of Sir Robert Huddleston, knight. According to his own statement he was born in the village of Cleovin (Clavering?), Essex, on 27 December 1636, and brought up in London until his twelfth year, when he was sent to the College of St. Omer. Later he entered the English College, Rome, on 6 September 1665. He left that institution to join the novitiate at Bonn in 1656, and in 1673 he became a professed father of the Society of Jesus. He was generally known by the name of Dormer, but he occasionally assumed the alias of Shirley.

In 1678 he was serving on the Lincolnshire mission at Blyborough. James II had a high regard for him, and appointed him one of the royal preachers at the court of St. James. On the outbreak of the Glorious Revolution in 1688 he left for the continent, was chosen rector of the College of Liège, and held that office till 23 April 1691. George Oliver stated that he died at Liège on 27 January 1700, but the catalogue of deceased members of the society records his death as occurring in London on 16–26 January 1700.

== Works ==
He is the author of Usury explain'd: or conscience quieted in the case of Putting out Mony at interest. By Philopenes. London, 1695-6; reprinted in The Pamphleteer (London, 1818), xi. 165-211.
