= 1770 in Great Britain =

Events from the year 1770 in Great Britain.

== Incumbents ==
- Monarch – George III
- Prime Minister – Augustus FitzRoy, 3rd Duke of Grafton (Whig) (until 28 January); Frederick North, Lord North (Tory) (starting 28 January)

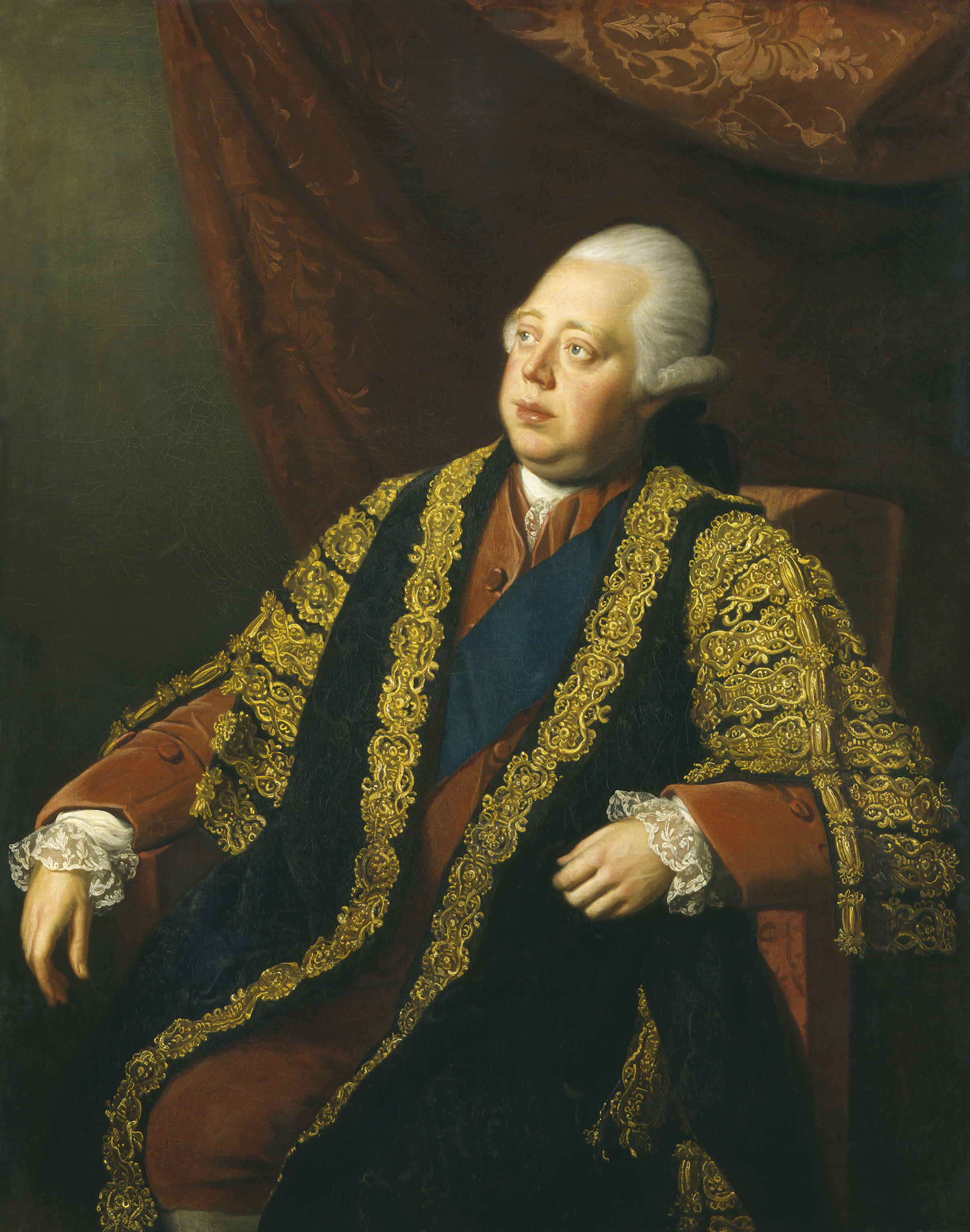
Frederick North, Lord North

== Events ==
- 17 January – American Revolution: British troops clash with American colonists at the Battle of Golden Hill.
- 28 January – following Grafton's resignation, Lord North forms a government and becomes Prime Minister.
- 5 March – Boston Massacre: five Americans killed by British troops in an event that helps start the American Revolutionary War five years later.
- 12 April – American Revolution: Parliament repeals the Townshend Act.
- 18 April (19 April by Cook's log) – first voyage of James Cook: English explorer Captain James Cook and his crew aboard HMS Endeavour become the first recorded Europeans to encounter the eastern coastline of the Australian continent.
- 28 April – David Hartley, leader of the Cragg Vale Coiners, is hanged near York.
- 1 May – first known record of the Jack in the Green folk tradition in England.
- May – the Louth Navigation canal in Lincolnshire opens.
- 9 June – Spanish troops seize Port Egmont in the Falkland Islands triggering the Falklands Crisis.
- 10 June – first voyage of James Cook: Captain Cook discovers the Great Barrier Reef when HMS Endeavour runs aground on it.
- 12 July – Industrial Revolution: James Hargreaves obtains a patent for the spinning jenny.
- 22 August (23 August by Cook's log) – Captain Cook determines that New Holland (Australia) is not contiguous with New Guinea and claims the whole of its eastern coast for Great Britain, later naming it all New South Wales.
- September – Royal Clarence Hotel, Exeter is advertised as a hotel, perhaps the first use of the word in England.
- 18 October – Radcliffe Infirmary, Oxford, admits its first patients.

=== Undated ===
- The chemist Joseph Priestley recommends the use of a rubber eraser to remove pencil marks.
- The London Evening Post becomes the first newspaper to publish parliamentary reports.

== Publications ==
- Edmund Burke's Thoughts on the Present Discontents.
- Oliver Goldsmith's poem The Deserted Village.
- Arthur Young's A Course of Experimental Agriculture.
- Tyneside folk song The Keel Row.

== Births ==
- 4 January – Edward Banks, building contractor (died 1835)
- 25 January – Francis Burdett, politician (died 1844)
- 2 February – George Gordon, 5th Duke of Gordon, nobleman, soldier and politician (died 1836)
- 11 March – William Huskisson, Member of Parliament (died 1830)
- 29 March – Elizabeth Conyngham, Marchioness Conyngham, mistress of George IV (died 1861)
- 7 April – William Wordsworth, poet (died 1850)
- 11 April – George Canning, Prime Minister of the United Kingdom (died 1827)
- 30 April – David Thompson, British–Canadian explorer (died 1857)
- 7 June – Robert Jenkinson, 2nd Earl of Liverpool, Prime Minister of the United Kingdom (died 1828)
- 18 October – Thomas Phillips, painter (died 1845)
- 28 October (bapt.) – Paul Storr, silversmith (died 1844)
- 5 November – Sarah Guppy, inventor (died 1852)
- 9 December (bapt.) – James Hogg, Scottish poet and novelist (died 1835)
- 13 December – John Clarke Whitfield, organist and composer (died 1836)

== Deaths ==
- c. January – William Falconer, Scottish poet and marine dictionary compiler (lost at sea) (born 1732)
- 20 January – Charles Yorke, Lord Chancellor of Great Britain (born 1722)
- 23 June – Mark Akenside, poet and physician (born 1721)
- 27 July – Robert Dinwiddie, British colonial Governor of Virginia (born 1693)
- 24 August – Thomas Chatterton, poet (suicide) (born 1752)
- 30 September – Thomas Robinson, 1st Baron Grantham, politician and diplomat (born c. 1695)
- 30 September – George Whitefield, Methodist leader (born 1714)
- 18 October – John Manners, Marquess of Granby, soldier (born 1721)
- 1 November – Alexander Cruden, Biblical scholar (born 1699 in Scotland)
- 9 November – John Campbell, 4th Duke of Argyll, politician (born c. 1693)
- 13 November – George Grenville, Prime Minister of Great Britain (born 1712)

== See also ==
- 1770 in Wales
