= 1637 in England =

- Centuries: 15th; 16th; 17th; 18th; 19th
- Decades: 1610s; 1620s; 1630s; 1640s; 1650s
- See also: Other events of 1637

Events from the year 1637 in England.

== Incumbents ==
- Monarch – Charles I
- Secretary of State – Sir John Coke

== Events ==
- 18 February – Eighty Years' War: Battle off Lizard Point: off the coast of Cornwall, a Spanish fleet intercepts an Anglo-Dutch merchant convoy of 44 vessels escorted by 6 warships, destroying or capturing 20 of them.
- 30 April – King Charles issues a proclamation attempting to stem emigration to the North American colonies.
- 27 June – English merchants led by captain John Weddell establish the first trading settlement at Canton.
- 30 June – William Prynne is branded as a seditious libeller, and sentenced to pillorying and mutilation.
- 13 October – First-rate ship of the line Sovereign of the Seas is launched at Woolwich Dockyard at a cost of £65,586, adorned from stern to bow with gilded carvings.
- Member of Parliament John Hampden continues to refuse to pay ship money although a 7-5 majority verdict among a group of judges supports its legality.

== Births ==
- March – Anne Hyde, first wife of King James II (died 1671)
- 17 March – Princess Anne (died 1640)
- 27 August – Charles Calvert, 3rd Baron Baltimore, Governor of Maryland (died 1715)
- 6 December – Edmund Andros, colonial administrator (died 1714)

== Deaths ==
- 6 August – Ben Jonson, writer (born 1572)
- 8 September – Robert Fludd, mystic (born 1574)
- 4 December – Nicholas Ferrar, trader (born 1592)
