= Storming of Farnham Castle =

Storming of the First English Civil War

Coordinates: 51°13′08″N 00°48′10″W

- Part of the First English Civil War
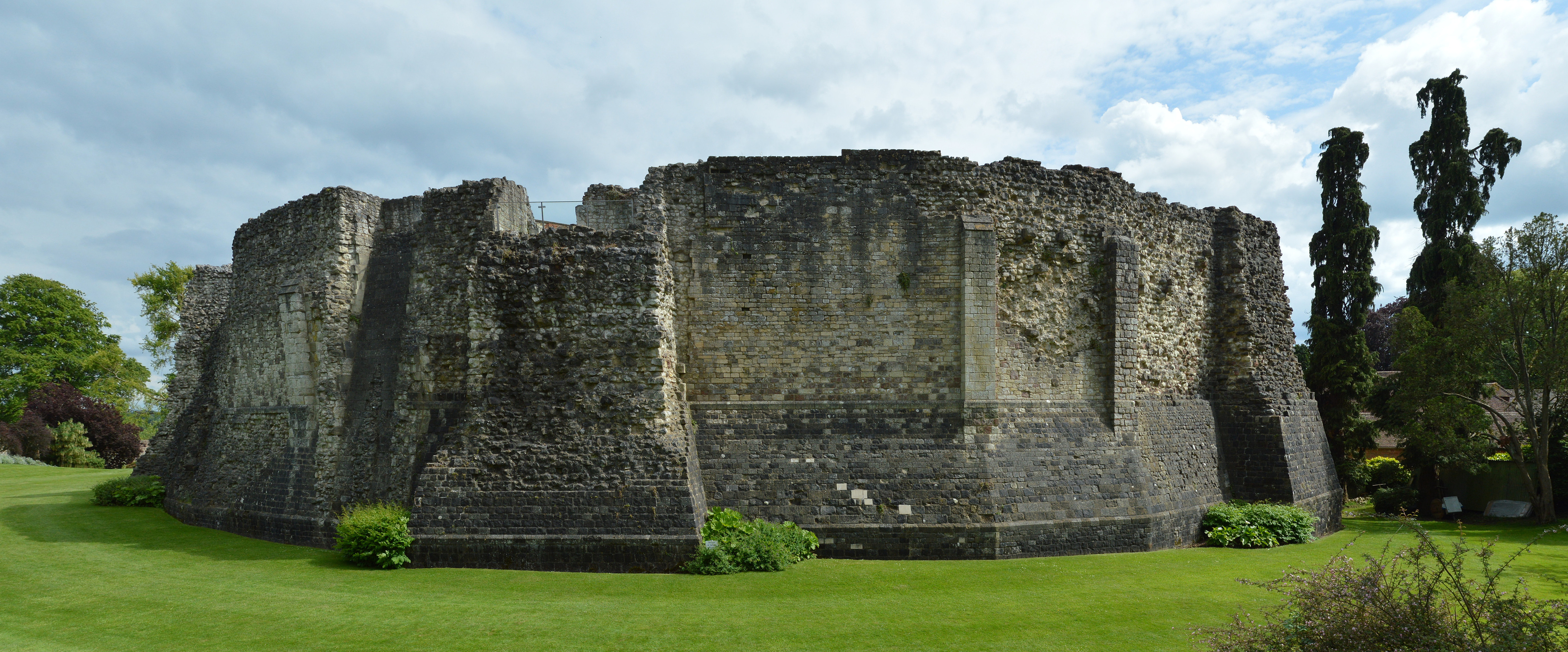
- Remains of the castle's keep
Date	1 December 1642
Location	Farnham Castle, Farnham, Surrey
Result	Parliamentarian victory

Belligerents
Royalists	Parliamentarians

Commanders and leaders
Sir John Denham	Sir William Waller
- Location within Surrey

The Storming of Farnham Castle occurred on 1 December 1642, during the early stages of the First English Civil War, when a Parliamentarian force attacked the Royalist garrison at Farnham Castle in Surrey. Sir John Denham had taken possession of the castle for the Royalists in mid-November, but after the Royalists had been turned back from London at the Battle of Turnham Green, a Parliamentarian force under the command of Sir William Waller approached the castle. After Denham refused to surrender, Waller's forces successfully stormed the castle. They captured it in under three hours, mostly due to the unwillingness of the Royalist troops to fight. This allowed the Parliamentarians to get close enough to breach the gates, after which the garrison surrendered.

== Background ==
Farnham Castle, near the town of Farnham in Surrey, is a twelfth-century castle which was the home to the Bishop of Winchester, Walter Curle. At the outbreak of the civil war, most of the area around Farnham favoured the Royalists.

In August 1642, King Charles I raised his royal standard in Nottingham and declared the Earl of Essex, and by extension Parliament, to be traitors, marking the start of the First English Civil War. That action had been the culmination of religious, fiscal and legislative tensions going back over fifty years. Both sides attempted to recruit the existing militia and new men into their armies. On 8 September, George Wither was given a commission as captain of a cavalry troop raised in Surrey. Just over a month later, on 14 October, with the addition of two squadrons described by the historian Stephen Manganiello as "weak, poorly-armed squadrons of volunteer horse with but 60 muskets between them", he occupied Farnham Castle.

Wither repeatedly requested additional troops and weapons to hold the castle, but when the Royalist army approached London in November 1642, after the Battle of Edgehill, Farnham Castle was considered of no strategic value, and Wither was ordered to abandon the castle. On the night of 8 November he evacuated his men and what ammunition he could, and Royalist forces under Sir John Denham took possession of the castle the next day. Denham had been appointed the High Sheriff of Surrey earlier that year by the King, and had also been issued with a commission of array, a medieval device for levying soldiers which had not been used since 1557. Denham's forces subsequently ransacked Wither's estate, ejecting his wife and children. Wither himself had been sent with his troop to Kingston upon Thames, and they subsequently fought in the Battle of Turnham Green on 13 November.

== Prelude ==
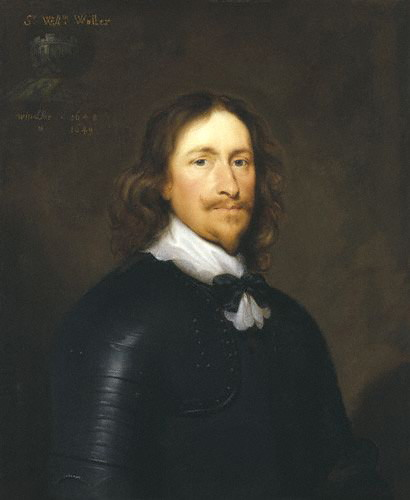
Sir William Waller was tasked with clearing the south east of England of Royalist forces.

The Royalist army was turned back from London after the stand-off at Turnham Green; the King retreated to Oxford, leaving a garrison at Reading. With London no longer threatened by the King's large army, the commander of Parliament's army, the Earl of Essex, wanted to clear the Royalists out of the south east of England completely. Command of the operation was given to Sir William Waller, a Member of Parliament and experienced soldier, who had rapidly gained seniority within the Parliamentarian army.

Most Royalist forces in the area withdrew to Reading or Oxford, but Denham remained at Farnham Castle. In his biography of Denham, Brendan O Hehir drew a parallel between Denham's experience and Wither's, saying that each had experienced "isolation amidst a rising enemy tide". Farnham Castle was not easily defensible, and Denham's troops reinforced the gate, barricading it with piles of wood.

== Battle ==
On 30 November, the Parliamentarian force commanded by Waller, which comprised cavalry and dragoons, approached the castle and demanded its surrender. Denham refused, as the Parliamentarians had not brought any artillery with which to bombard the castle. The Royalists were well stocked; as well as plentiful weapons and ammunition, they also had 300 sheep, 100 oxen and plenty of other food.

The inexperienced Royalist soldiers shied away from fighting, unwilling to show themselves on the castle walls and hiding behind the castle's defences instead. After three hours of fighting, in the absence of substantial defensive musket-fire, Waller's troops were able to get close enough to attach a petard to the gate. Despite the meagre defence, Colonel Anthony Fane, one of the Parliamentarian officers, was shot in the cheek, and died from the wound at his home in Kingston shortly thereafter. According to Elliot Warburton, in his 19th century history, Memoir of Prince Rupert and the Cavaliers, Fane was "almost the only person slain". Once the Parliamentarians had destroyed the gate, they were still unable to gain entrance to the castle because of the wooden barricade; however, the garrison surrendered after they had broken through and entered the keep.

The Royalist courtier, Edward Hyde, Earl of Clarendon was disdainful of the efforts of Denham and his men, writing in his history of the war that they "were taken with less resistance than was fit," and "deserved not the name of a garrison."

== Aftermath ==
Denham and his men were taken prisoner and sent to London, where they arrived on 3 December. The common men were quickly released, but others were held for longer at Lambeth House. It is unclear exactly when Denham was released, but it was before 23 March 1643. After gaining his freedom, he joined the King in Oxford. He soon after petitioned to Charles I on behalf of Wither, who had been captured, brought to Oxford, and faced the death penalty for fighting against the King. Denham pled to the King to spare Wither, as "while Wither lives, Denham will not be the worst poet in England." Wither was given a reprieve, but after his release, he seized Denham's estate with Parliament's permission in an effort to offset his financial losses during the war. Denham retired from military life, and is best remembered as a poet; he published an array of propaganda for the Royalists during the war.

Waller captured over £40,000 worth of plunder, along with gunpowder and shoes. He subsequently captured Winchester, Arundel and Chichester, and within one month, he had asserted Parliamentarian dominance over Surrey, Sussex and most of Hampshire. His successes saw him appointed as Major-General of the West the following spring, and he was sent by Essex to attempt to claim the south west of England for Parliament. Farnham Castle was subsequently used by Waller as his base of operations; after the war it was slighted by Parliament.
