= William Ward (priest) =

English Roman Catholic priest and martyr

William Ward (real name Webster) (about 1560 at Thornby in Westmoreland – 26 July 1641 at Tyburn) was an English Roman Catholic priest. He is a Catholic martyr, beatified in 1929.

== Life ==
He was over forty when he went to Douay College to study for the priesthood; no details have been preserved of his earlier life, though he is believed to be a convert from Anglicanism. He arrived there on 18 September 1604; received the minor orders on 16 December 1605; the subdiaconate on 26 October 1607; the diaconate on 31 May 1608; and the priesthood on the following day.

On 14 October he started for England, but was driven onto the shores of Scotland, arrested, and imprisoned for three years. On obtaining his liberty, he travelled to England where he worked for thirty years, twenty of which he spent in various prisons. He was zealous and fiery by temperament, severe with himself and others, and especially devoted to hearing confessions. Though he had the reputation of being a very exacting director, his earnestness drew to him many penitents.

He was in London when Parliament issued the proclamation of 7 April 1641, banishing all priests under pain of death, but he refused to retire, and on 15 July was arrested at the house of his nephew. Six days later he was brought to trial at the Old Bailey and was condemned to death on 23 July. He was executed on the feast of St. Anne, to whom he ever had a great devotion.

An oil portrait, painted shortly after the martyrdom from memory or possibly from an earlier sketch, is preserved at St. Edmund's College, Ware.
