= 1640 in England =

- Centuries: 15th; 16th; 17th; 18th; 19th
- Decades: 1620s; 1630s; 1640s; 1650s; 1660s
- See also: Other events of 1640

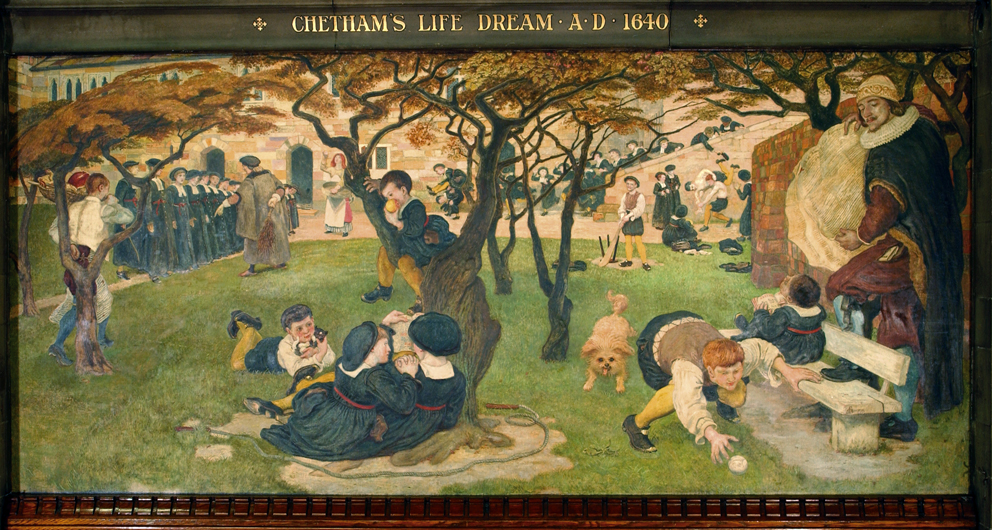
"Chetham’s Life’s Dream A.D. 1640" by Ford Madox Brown, a mural at Manchester Town Hall.

Events from the year 1640 in England.

== Incumbents ==
- Monarch – Charles I

== Events ==
- 5 January – Parliament fixes a quorum of 40 for its proceedings to be transacted.
- 12 January – Thomas Wentworth becomes Lord-Lieutenant of Ireland and Earl of Strafford.
- 17 January – John Finch becomes Lord Keeper of the Great Seal.
- 13 April – King Charles I summons the Short Parliament in an attempt to fund the Second Bishops' War against the Scottish Covenanters.
- 17 April – John Pym makes a speech attacking the King in Parliament.
- 4 May – Oliver St John calls on Parliament to outlaw ship money.
- 5 May – the King dismisses the Short Parliament and prepares to attack Scotland.
- 6 May – the Earl of Warwick, Lord Brooke, Lord Saye, John Pym, John Hampden, and Sir Walter Earle arrested.
- 11–12 May – attack on Lambeth Palace by a London mob; Archbishop Laud has fled. A young drummer, Benstead, is convicted of treason for encouraging the crowd, hanged, drawn and quartered, and has his head set above London Bridge; and a glover, John Archer, supposed by the authorities to be a leader, becomes the last person in England to be tortured on the rack (in the Tower of London), but does not reveal any other names.
- 20 August – a Scottish Covenanter army invades Northumberland.
- 28 August – Battle of Newburn: the Covenanter army defeats the English army.
- 26 October – Treaty of Ripon signed between the King and the Covenanters.
- 3 November – the Long Parliament is summoned; it will not be dissolved for 20 years.
- 25 November – the Earl of Strafford imprisoned in the Tower of London.
- 11 December – a crowd of 1,500 Londoners presents the Root and Branch petition to the Long Parliament, calling for the abolition of episcopacy in the Church of England.
- 18 December – Archbishop Laud impeached for treason.
- undated – Habeas Corpus Act ("An Act for the Regulating the Privie Councell and for taking away the Court commonly called the Star Chamber") passed, abolishing the Star Chamber.

== Births ==
- 11 January – Sir Robert Burdett, 3rd Baronet, politician (died 1716)
- 25 January – William Cavendish, 1st Duke of Devonshire, soldier and statesman (died 1707)
- 6 February – William Campion, politician (died 1702)
- 13 February – Richard Edgcumbe, politician (died 1688)
- 29 February – Benjamin Keach, Particular Baptist preacher (died 1704)
- 30 March – John Trenchard, statesman (died 1695)
- 19 June – Thomas Widdrington, politician (died 1660)
- 29 June – Elizabeth Stanhope, Countess of Chesterfield (died 1665)
- 12 October – Sir Roger Twisden, 2nd Baronet (died 1703)
- 18 October – William Stanley, Member of Parliament (died 1670)
- 23 October – Elisabeth Pepys, née de St Michel, wife of Samuel (died 1669)
- 28 October – Streynsham Master, colonial administrator (died 1724)
- 5 November – John Verney, 1st Viscount Fermanagh, politician and merchant (died 1717)
- 17 November – Barbara Palmer, 1st Duchess of Cleveland, née Villiers, a mistress of King Charles II (died 1709)
- 7 December (bapt.) – Fabian Stedman, pioneer of change ringing (died 1713)
- 13 December – Robert Plot, naturalist (died 1696)
- 14 December – Aphra Behn, née Amis, Johnson or Cooper?, author (died 1689)

== Deaths ==
- 14 January – Thomas Coventry, 1st Baron Coventry, lawyer and judge (born 1578)
- 25 January – Robert Burton, scholar (born 1577)
- 17 March – Philip Massinger, dramatist (born 1583)
- 22 March – Thomas Carew, poet (born 1595)
- 28 April (bur.) – William Alabaster, poet and dramatist (born 1567)
- 3 June – Theophilus Howard, 2nd Earl of Suffolk, politician (born 1584)
- 20 October – John Ball, Puritan clergyman (born 1585)
- 13 November – Laurence Chaderton, academic and churchman (born 1536)
- 8 December – Princess Anne, daughter of King Charles I (born 1637)
