= 1644 in England =

- Centuries: 15th; 16th; 17th; 18th; 19th
- Decades: 1620s; 1630s; 1640s; 1650s; 1660s
- See also: Other events of 1644

Events from the year 1644 in England. This is the third year of the First English Civil War, fought between Roundheads (Parliamentarians) and Cavaliers (Royalist supporters of King Charles I).

== Incumbents ==
- Monarch – Charles I

== Events ==
- January – Oliver Cromwell and his soldiers impose a Puritanical regime of worship at Ely Cathedral.
- 22 January – King Charles I opens the Royalist 'Oxford Parliament'.
- 26 January – First English Civil War: at the Battle of Nantwich the Parliamentarians defeat the Royalists, ending a week's siege of the Cheshire town.
- March – Matthew Hopkins begins his career as a witch-hunter in the eastern counties.
- 21 March – First English Civil War: Prince Rupert effects the Relief of Newark.
- 29 March – First English Civil War: Parliamentary victory at the Battle of Cheriton in Hampshire.
- 20 April–14 June – First English Civil War: Royalists under Prince Maurice besiege Lyme Regis in Dorset. They do not take the town, but destroy twenty ships.
- 25 May – First English Civil War: Royalist forces under Prince Rupert storm and take Stockport and cross the Mersey.
- 28 May – First English Civil War: Bolton Massacre: Royalist forces under Prince Rupert kill several hundreds of the town's defenders.
- 11 June – First English Civil War: Prince Rupert and his men take Liverpool Castle. Liverpool is later reclaimed by Sir John Moore.
- 29 June – First English Civil War: Royalist victory at the Battle of Cropredy Bridge.
- 2 July – First English Civil War: Battle of Marston Moor, the largest battle of the war, produces a crushing victory for the Parliamentary side in Yorkshire, ending Charles I's hold on the north of England.
- 14 July – Queen Henrietta Maria leaves the country for France.
- 16 July – First English Civil War: Parliamentary forces capture York.
- 2 September – Second Battle of Lostwithiel in Cornwall, the last major victory for Charles I and the Royalist side in the English Civil War.
- 22 October – Newcastle upon Tyne captured by a Scottish army led by Alexander Leslie, 1st Earl of Leven.
- 27 October – First English Civil War: Parliamentary victory at the Second Battle of Newbury.
- 23 November – John Milton's Areopagitica, an appeal for freedom of speech, is published in London.
- 19 December – the House of Commons passes the Self-denying Ordinance.
- 25 December – Christmas falls on a date set aside for fasting by Parliament, whose supporters are enjoined to observe the fast.
- 1644 Baptist Confession of Faith drawn up in London.

== Births ==
- 14 January – Thomas Britton, concert promoter (died 1714)
- 18 January – John Partridge, astrologer (died 1708)
- 21 March – Sir Walter Bagot, 3rd Baronet, Member of Parliament (died 1704)
- 22 March – Sir James Rushout, 1st Baronet, Member of Parliament (died 1698)
- 31 March – Henry Winstanley, engineer (died 1703)
- 16 June – Henrietta Anne Stuart, Princess of England, Ireland and Scotland (died 1670)
- 30 August – Thomas Tufton, 6th Earl of Thanet, nobleman and politician (died 1729)
- 14 October – William Penn, Quaker and founder of Pennsylvania (died 1718)
- Thomas Guy, speculator and philanthropist (died 1724)
- Approximate date – Elizabeth Haselwood English silversmith (died 1715)

== Deaths ==
- 30 January – William Chillingworth, theologian (born 1602)
- 22 June – Sir Edward Dering, 1st Baronet, antiquary and politician (born 1598)
- 2 July – William Gascoigne, scientist (born c. 1610)
- 20 July – Peter Hausted, poet and playwright (year of birth unknown)
- July – William Crabtree, astronomer and mathematician (born 1610)
- September – Sir Thomas Barrington, 2nd Baronet, Member of Parliament (year of birth unknown)
- 8 September
  - John Coke, politician (born 1563)
  - Francis Quarles, poet (born 1592)
- 6 November – Thomas Roe, diplomat (born c. 1581)
- 28 December – John Bankes, judge (born 1589)
