= Protestation of 1641 =

The Protestation of 1641 was an attempt to avert the English Civil War. Parliament passed a bill on 3 May 1641 requiring those over the age of 18 to sign the Protestation, an oath of allegiance to King Charles I and the Church of England, as a way to reduce the tensions across the realm. Signing them was a necessity in order to hold public office. Those that were not willing to sign it were also listed under it as refusing to pledge its oath.

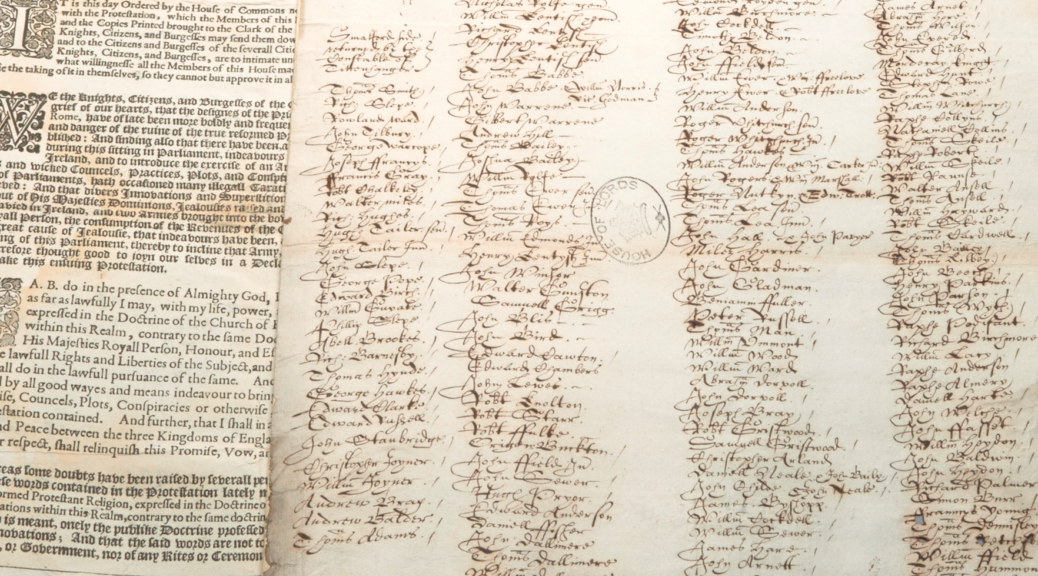
An example of a list of signatures from the 1641 Protestation

The Protestation was also a part of a context of political, religious, and social anxiety due to intense changes in a short period in England during the Early Modern era. As further changes and armed conflict loomed closer, both Parliament and those loyal to the king attempted to find ways to avoid it. One of the ways they found to do that was via oath of allegiances, the first of which was the Protestation. It began in May 1641 with the intention of getting all Englishmen above the age of 18 to swear a vow to defend King Charles I and the Church of England. Ultimately it failed and tensions continued to escalate between Parliament and King Charles I, eventually leading to the start of the English Civil Wars in August 1642. However, the Protestation is an enlightening historical phenomenon that help us understand the process that led to the English Civil Wars and attempts that people made to avert a costly conflict, even from those at the center of the hostilities.

In the context of the English Civil Wars, the Protestation is an interesting, but often unexplored topic. Apart from its implications in population census and local historiography, it provides an understanding of how people during the decade of 1640 attempted to avoid a potentially costly and bloody conflict. It happened not once, but three times until the civil wars broke out. The Protestation also fits in the timeline of the English Civil Wars, which shook the realm and altered its relationships. Their outcome was the beheading of King Charles, the temporary suspension of kingship under Oliver Cromwell's rule, and the English Restoration under Charles II, showing the complexity of events and general social anxiety reigning during Stuart England.

== Background ==
The antecedents of the Protestation can be divided into political and religious aspects. Religiously, the 16th and 17th centuries were a period of vast changes and religious conflicts. Starting in 1517, the Protestant Reformation of Martin Luther began the process of ending the Catholic hegemony in Western faith and its political consequences. It reached the British Isles during the reign of Henry VIII, when multiple acts of Parliament on religious reform were passed, ultimately leading to the Break with Rome in 1534, when the Act of Supremacy was passed. Most Englishmen, however, remained Catholic and conflicts and anxiety lingered. In 1641, amid fears of the Protestant Reformation being in danger of being undone, alleged Papist plots, and Catholic influence under the court of Charles I, the House of Commons during the Long Parliament was ordered by royal decree to prepare a national declaration to help reduce the tensions across England on the matter. That national declaration became the Protestation of 1641 and was, in fact, the first of three oaths of allegiance imposed by the Long Parliament between May 1641 and September 1643, being followed by Vow and Covenant and Solemn League and Covenant. Throughout the buildup to the English Civil Wars, discontentment among Protestants for the measures of the Archbishop of Canterbury William Laud that intended to transform the Church of England into a more ceremonial one, according to the theology of Arminianism, led to conflicts between the Church of England and Puritans.

Politically, Charles was forced to end his Personal Rule and call Parliament to raise money for an army to fight the Covenanters in the Second Bishops' War and put revolts in Ireland down. The House of Commons and the House of Lords, led by John Pym, instead focused on protesting against the government. Charles saw this as an attack against the King, dissolving what became known as the Short Parliament within three weeks. Charles decided to go on the offensive against the Scottish revolt without Parliament and recalled Thomas Wentworth, 1st Earl of Strafford from Ireland to lead his army in Scotland. Strafford had successfully controlled the Irish revolt by convincing the Catholic gentry to pay taxes in exchange of future religious benefits, thus increasing the revenue of Charles I and pacifying Ireland. However, upon Strafford's failures in the battlefield and economic shortcomings from the expenses both English and Scottish armies, as Charles I was the King of both, he followed the advice of his Magnum Concillium, the House of Lords when the Parliament was not in section, and recalled Parliament to increase taxes and raise a new army to defeat the Scottish rebellion. This Parliament is known as the Long Parliament, as it met for twenty years between 1640 and 1660.

The Long Parliament, however, would turn out to be more hostile against Charles I's interests than the Short Parliament had been. Once more under the leadership of John Pym, it began to vote on laws that would limit royal power, such as with the prohibition on taxation without Parliamentary consent and the control of Parliament over the King's ministers. Even though the Members of Parliament were strongly opposed to Charles I, they also attempted to enact legislation to reduce tensions and avert the likelihood that an armed conflict between the King and Parliament, the first of them being called as the Protestation. Its intent was to prevent the conflicts between both factions from turning into a costly civil war.

== Protestation ==
Reacting to scares and anxiety that the Protestant Reformation was in danger of being replaced, especially due to the Catholic influence around King Charles I, a ten-man committee of the House of Commons was selected to draft a national declaration. From this, stemmed the first oath of allegiance to King Charles I and to the Protestant Reformation in the Church of England. It was written on 3 May 1641 and passed in Parliament, soon all members of the House of Commons had sworn under it and on the following day, so did the members of the House of Lords. Then, letters were sent from the speaker of the House of Commons to sheriffs of each Parish communicating them about the decision and for them to also swear into it, as well as the Judges of Peace. The final step was for the sheriffs and Judges of Peace to read it in Church and have all present sign it, which should be all of the population as they were obligated to go to church every Sunday under penalty of fine. Those that refused to sign under it were also written in the list and were deemed unfit to sit in a public office. This process lasted until February and March 1642. The text of the oath that these Englishmen were asked to swear under was the following:

"I, _ A.B. _ do, in the presence of Almighty God, promise, vow, and protest to maintain, and defend as far as lawfully I may, with my Life, Power and Estate, the true Reformed Protestant religion, expressed in the Doctrine of the Church of England, against all Popery and Popish Innovations, within this Realm, contrary to the same Doctrine, and according to the duty of my Allegiance, to His Majesties Royal Person, Honour and Estate, as also the Power and Privileges of Parliament, the lawful Rights and Liberties of the Subjects, and any person that maketh this Protestation, in whatsoever he shall do in the lawful Pursuance of the same: and to my power, and as far as lawfully I may, I will oppose and by all good Ways and Means endeavour to bring to condign Punishment all such as shall, either by Force, Practice, Councels, Plots, Conspiracies, or otherwise, doe any thing to the contrary of any thing in this present Protestation contained: and further, that I shall, in all just and honourable ways, endeavour to preserve the Union and Peace betwixt the Three Kingdoms of England, Scotland and Ireland: and neither for Hope, Fear, nor other Respect, shell relinquish this Promise, Vow and Protestation."

By forcing all Englishmen above 18 years old to sign an oath of allegiance to King Charles I and to the Church of England, the hope was that they would unite under the King and not engage on a potentially bloody internal conflict. However, on 18 January 1642, following King Charles I's attempt to arrest the Five Members of Parliament on 4 January, the speaker of the House of Commons William Lenthall sent out an additional letter to sheriffs across England demanding that all males over 18 years old to take the oath. Lenthall's assumption was that those that refused to do so would be Catholics and thus unfit to occupy an office in the Church or State of England, as well as to facilitate identifying potential backers of King Charles I across England. However, it was not an effective way of distinguishing Catholics, as some of them signed the oath with reservations to their faith, while other Protestants refused to sign it at all. The lists were returned to Parliament later in 1642, being known the Protestation Returns.

Ultimately, the Protestation failed to accomplish its goals. Had it been successful as an oath of allegiance, its two successors, the Vow and Covenant and the Solemn League and Covenant, would not have been necessary. Further, it was ineffective in uniting the realm under Charles I and averting a civil war, as the English Civil Wars began shortly after. Finally, it did not allow Parliament to distinguish between Catholics and Protestants, due to the disparity between those that signed the list and known Catholics, as per the recusancy lists. Rather than being an instrument against internal conflicts, it fed on them when Speaker Lenthall send the additional letter demanding that all men above 18 years old sign the oath as a response to Charles I's attempt to arrest the Five Members of Parliament. However, these lists have been useful to historians as a partial census of population, a guideline to estimate it, an important tool for genealogists in search of ancestors from before the English Civil Wars, and for academics interested in last name distributions before the civil wars erupted.

== Aftermath ==
Following the failure of the 1641 Protestation, the Long Parliament tried two more times to organize an oath of allegiance to King Charles and the Church of England, but they saw the same fate as its predecessor. The Long Parliament then turned its focus to Thomas Wentworth, the Earl of Strafford, and accused him of treason and other minor crimes. Strafford was beloved by Charles I and the king did not want any sort of punishment against him. Not affected by this, John Pym was able to obtain notes from the King's Privy Council where Strafford claimed that Charles I was absolved from the rules of government because he had done his duty and his subject failed on theirs, thus Charles was allowed to use his army that was in Ireland to suppress all revolts against him. Soon afterwards, Pym proposed a Bill of Attainder on Strafford to execute him, which after some resistance was approved by the House of Commons and the House of Lords on 21 April 1641. Charles I initially refused to sign it, and without his signature Strafford would be safe. However, on 10 May, fearing the safety of his family, Charles I signed it and Strafford was decapitated two days later.

It was hoped that with the execution of Strafford and the Protestation, tensions between Parliament and King would be deescalated, but the opposite occurred. Still in May 1641, the Long Parliament passed the Triennial Act 1640 (16 Cha. 1. c. 1), demanding that Parliament meet at least at every three years, even without a Royal summons. Further, it prohibited any source of increased revenue for the Crown without Parliament consent, such as Charles I's Ship Tax. At this time, however, Parliament was still focusing its efforts against bad counselors that were blamed for Charles I's failures, and not the King himself. As conflicts escalated, both sides suspected of each other. Parliament suspected that Charles I wanted to impose Armianism on them and force them to comply to his royal prerogative by military force. Charles and royalists were distrustful and resented by the continuous Parliamentary demands, which they saw as against the king's royal prerogative and position. Neither party was able to develop the conflicts further at this point, as the Irish, fearing the imposition of Protestantism in their Catholic land rebelled and that country descended into chaos. Soon, rumors began circulating that Charles I was backing the Irish rebels and that he at anytime would turn against Puritans, just as Strafford had suggested, thus spreading panic across the Puritans.

Charles I, attempting to end his Parliamentary problems once and for all, marched into Parliament on 4 January 1642, with 400 soldiers planning to arrest the Five Members of Parliament, leaders behind the demands of Parliament. However, they had fled and Charles was not able to arrest them for treason. When he asked the Speaker of the House of Commons about their location, William Lethal replied that he was a servant of Parliament and would not answer the king's requests. Just a few days afterwards, Charles I fled London for the country for his safety, while cities and towns declared itself for one of the factions, although most of England remained neutral. As Summer advanced, negotiations between King and Parliament did not lead to fruition and the stalemate remained. On 22 August 1642, Charles I raised his Royal Standard and a war that for long had been looming started as last. On one side, the Cavaliers or Loyalists were followers of the Church of England that wanted to maintain the traditional forms of government in Church and State based on the monarch. On the other, the Parliamentarians or Roundheads were Puritans that wanted to defend what they thought was the traditional form of Church and State that had been unjustly altered by Charles due to ill advice during his 11 years of personal rule. What followed was 9 years of civil wars between 1642 and 1651, the first one ending when Charles I was placed under Parliament custody and put to trial. In the succession of the trial of Charles I, he was executed for treason in 1649 and the kingship was replaced with Oliver Cromwell's Commonwealth of England. Given the outcome of the conflicts between Charles I and Parliament, it is clear in hindsight that the Protestation failed and was always bound to do so, but for people at the time under the constraints that they were under and being ignorant of the future, the Protestation was a valid try at avoiding a costly civil war.

== See also ==
- Protestation Returns of 1641–1642
- English Reformation
- Commonwealth of England
- English Civil War
- Early Modern England
- English Restoration
- Trial of Charles I
- Stuart England

== Sources ==
- Carlton, Charles, Archbishop William Laud, London: Routledge and Keagan Paul, 1987.
- Carlton, Charles, Charles I: The Personal Monarch, Great Britain: Routledge, 1995.
- Coward, Barry, The Stuart Age, London: Longman, 1994.
- Coward, Barry, The Stuart age: England, 1603–1714, Harlow: Pearson Education, 2003.
- Gardiner, Samuel Rawson, History of England from the Accession of James I to the Outbreak of the Civil war 1603–1642, Vol.9 1883. Cambridge, 2011
- Kelsey (2003). "The Trial of Charles I". English Historical Review. 118 (447): 583–616. doi:10.1093/ehr/118.477.583.
- Purkiss, Diane, The English Civil War: A People's History, London: Harper Perennial, 2007.
- Sherwood, Roy Edward, Oliver Cromwell: King In All But Name, 1653–1658, New York: St Martin's Press, 1997.
- Vallance, E., Revolutionary England and the National Covenant: State Oaths, Protestantism, and the Political Nation, 1553–1682. 2005.
- Walter, John, Understanding Popular Violence in the English Revolution: The Colchester Plunderers, Cambridge: Cambridge University Press, 1999.
- Wedgwood, C. V., The King's War: 1641–1647, London: Fontana, 1970.
- Whiteman, Anne The Protestation Returns of 1641–1642’. Local Population Studies, 60. 1995.
- Royal Commission on Historical Manuscripts, Fifth Report of The Royal Commission on Historical Manuscripts. Part I, Appendix 3
- "The Protestation Oath of 1641". Cornwall OPC Database. https://www.cornwall-opc-database.org/extra-searches/protestation-returns/protestation-oath-of-1641/ .Retrieved 2 May 2019.
