= Richard Edlin =

Richard Edlin or Edlyn (1631–1677), was an English astrologer.

== Life ==
Edlin was born 29 September 1631, and was practicing in June 1659 what he terms his "noble science" in "New Buildings in Sugar Loaf Court at the lower end of Tenter Alley nere little More-fields", but by 1664 had removed to a less retired "study next door above the Four Swans in Bishopsgate Street".

== Works ==
He published:

- Observationes Astrologicæ, or An Astrologicall Discourse of the Effects of that notable conjunction of Saturn and Mars that happened October 11, 1658, and other Configurations concomitant. … To which is prefixed a brief Institution for the better understanding the following Discourse, or any other of the like nature; and also added, a most ingenious Discourse of the true Systeme of the World, 2 pts., 8vo, London [1659] (with a new title-page, 8vo, London, 1668).
- Præ-Nuncius Sydereus: An Astrological Treatise of the Effects of the Great Conjunction of the two Superior Planets, Saturn & Jupiter, October the Xth 1663, and other Configurations concomitant. Wherein the Fate of Europe for these next twenty years is … conjectured, &c., 4to, London, 1664.

Unfortunately, by reason of "those enormities" the author had been "so abundantly subject to", many of the events foretold had happened before the book came forth, "but not before it was penn'd", declares Edlin, "as divers of my friends do very well know". He omits all mention of his own fate, apparently through modesty; he died 19 February 1676–7.
