= Protestation Returns of 1641–1642 =

Lists of English oathtakers and refusers

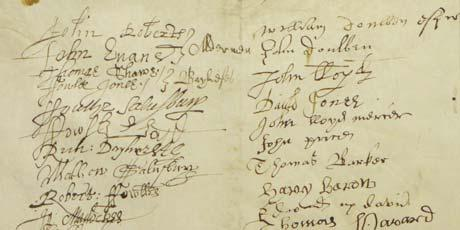
Page from the Protestation Returns

The Protestation Returns of 1641–1642 are lists of English males over the age of 18 who took, or did not take, an oath of allegiance "to live and die for the true Protestant religion, the liberties and rights of subjects and the privilege of Parliaments." These lists were usually compiled by parish, or township, within hundred, or wapentake. They are of importance to local historians for estimating populations, to genealogists trying to find an ancestor immediately before the English Civil War and for scholars interested in surname distributions.

Records survive for about one-third of the lists.

== Background ==
In May 1641, reacting to scares, rumours of plots and anxiety that the Protestant reformation was in danger of being undone, a 10-man committee of the House of Commons, in the Long Parliament, was appointed to draft a national declaration. It was the first of three oaths of loyalty imposed by the Long Parliament, between May 1641 and September 1643. The others were the Vow and covenant and the Solemn League and Covenant.

All males above the age of 18 were asked to sign the declaration by order of the House of Commons, all adult men were asked to swear the oath to the Protestant religion. In each parish, their names were inscribed in a list and sent back to parliament. Typically a local official wrote out all the names, although in some areas the signees wrote their own names.

The declaration, or Protestation, read:

I, _ A.B. _ do, in the presence of Almighty God, promise, vow, and protest to maintain, and defend as far as lawfully I may, with my Life, Power and Estate, the true Reformed Protestant religion, expressed in the Doctrine of the Church of England, against all Popery and Popish Innovations, within this Realm, contrary to the same Doctrine, and according to the duty of my Allegiance, to His Majesties Royal Person, Honour and Estate, as also the Power and Privileges of Parliament, the lawful Rights and Liberties of the Subjects, and any person that maketh this Protestation, in whatsoever he shall do in the lawful Pursuance of the same: and to my power, and as far as lawfully I may, I will oppose and by all good Ways and Means endeavour to bring to condign Punishment all such as shall, either by Force, Practice, Councels, Plots, Conspiracies, or otherwise, doe any thing to the contrary of any thing in this present Protestation contained: and further, that I shall, in all just and honourable ways, endeavour to preserve the Union and Peace betwixt the Three Kingdoms of England, Scotland and Ireland: and neither for Hope, Fear, nor other Respect, shell relinquish this Promise, Vow and Protestation.

It was taken by the members of the House of Commons on 3 May 1641. The following day the Protestant peers in the House of Lords also swore it. Subsequently, on 18 January 1642, perhaps prompted by the King's attempt on 4 January to arrest the Five Members of parliament, the Speaker, William Lenthall, sent out a letter to the effect that all males of eighteen or over should take the oath. The idea was that those that refused to take the oath would be presumed to be Catholics and so unfit to hold office in Church or state. In fact it was not a particularly effective way of distinguishing Catholics from Protestants, as in some areas Catholics took the oath with reservations concerning their religion, and others that were known from recusancy lists, appeared on the returns.

Many county returns have been published; Cornwall, Devon, Nottinghamshire, Oxfordshire, and Lincolnshire amongst them.

A guide to the returns has been published by the Federation of Family History Societies.

== See also ==
- Demographics of England
- Early modern demography
