= 1457 in England =

- Centuries: 13th; 14th; 15th; 16th; 17th
- Decades: 1430s; 1440s; 1450s; 1460s; 1470s
- See also: Other events of 1457

Events from the year 1457 in England.

== Incumbents ==
- Monarch – Henry VI
- Lord Chancellor – William Waynflete
- Lord Privy Seal – Lawrence Booth

== Events ==
- 1 January – Osmund of Salisbury (died 1099) is canonised, the last English saint created until the 20th century. His remains are translated from Old Sarum to Salisbury Cathedral on 23 July.
- 28 January – Margaret Beaufort gives birth to Henry Tudor, the future king, at Pembroke Castle in Wales.
- 28 August – French raiders under Pierre de Brézé sack Sandwich, Kent.
- Unknown – Robert Sturmy sails from Bristol on his unsuccessful attempt to break the Italian monopoly on trade in the Eastern Mediterranean.

== Births ==
- 28 January – King Henry VII of England (died 1509)
- George Nevill, Duke of Bedford (died 1483).
- Thomas West, 8th Baron De La Warr (died 1525).

== Deaths ==
- Robert Neville, bishop (born 1404).
