= 1458 in England =

- Centuries: 13th; 14th; 15th; 16th; 17th
- Decades: 1430s; 1440s; 1450s; 1460s; 1470s
- See also: Other events of 1458

Events from the year 1458 in England.

== Incumbents ==
- Monarch – Henry VI
- Lord Chancellor – William Waynflete
- Lord Privy Seal – Lawrence Booth

== Events ==
- 25 March – The Love Day is staged in London, by which Henry VI of England attempts to unite the warring factions who have triggered the Wars of the Roses
- 15 July – foundation of Magdalen College, Oxford.
- May – Richard Neville, 16th Earl of Warwick defeats a Spanish fleet in the English Channel.

== Births ==
- Richard Grey, half brother of Edward V of England (died 1483)
- Thomas Docwra, Grand Prior of the English Knights Hospitaller (died 1527)
- Catherine Woodville, Duchess of Buckingham, noblewoman (died 1497)

== Deaths ==
- Thomas Gascoigne, theologian (born 1404)
- Thomas de Courtenay, Earl of Devon, nobleman (born 1414)
- Humphrey Stafford, Earl of Stafford, nobleman (born 1425)
- John Shillingford, politician (unknown year of birth)
- Thomas Rempston, soldier (unknown year of birth)
