= 1459 in England =

- Centuries: 13th; 14th; 15th; 16th; 17th
- Decades: 1430s; 1440s; 1450s; 1460s; 1470s
- See also: Other events of 1459

Events from the year 1459 in England.

== Incumbents ==
- Monarch – Henry VI
- Lord Chancellor – William Waynflete
- Lord Privy Seal – Lawrence Booth

== Events ==
- 23 September – Wars of the Roses: at the Battle of Blore Heath in Staffordshire, Yorkists under Richard Neville, 5th Earl of Salisbury defeat a Lancastrian force.
- 12 October – Wars of the Roses: Lancastrian victory at the Battle of Ludford Bridge. Following the battle, the Duke of York flees to Ireland.
- 10 November – Parliament of Devils, held at Coventry, condemns Yorkists as traitors.

== Births ==
- Edward Poynings, Lord Deputy of Ireland to Henry VII (died 1521)

== Deaths ==
- James Tuchet, 5th Baron Audley (born c. 1398) (killed in battle)
- John Fastolf, soldier (born 1380)
- Thomas Stanley, 1st Baron Stanley, nobleman (born 1405)
- Walter Devereux, prominent Yorkist (born 1411)
