= 1455 in England =

- Centuries: 13th; 14th; 15th; 16th; 17th
- Decades: 1430s; 1440s; 1450s; 1460s; 1470s
- See also: Other events of 1455

Events from the year 1455 in England.

== Incumbents ==
- Monarch – Henry VI
- Lord Chancellor – Thomas Bourchier
- Lord Privy Seal – Thomas Lisieux

== Events ==
- May – The garrison of English Calais mutinies over pay arrears.
- 22 May – Richard, Duke of York defeats the army of Henry VI at the First Battle of St Albans. Henry is captured, marking the beginning of the Wars of the Roses.
- 23 October – Bonville–Courtenay feud in Devon: Thomas Courtenay, heir to the Earl of Devon, arranges the murder of lawyer Nicholas Radford.
- 19 November – The Duke of York is reinstated as Lord Protector, acting as regent for the King.
- November–December – Bonville–Courtenay feud leads to continued rioting and rebellion in Devon including sacking of Exeter.
- 15 December – The first battle of Clyst Heath is fought as part of the Bonville–Courtenay feud
- Unknown – Earliest known reference to knitting in England.
- Unknown – The Importation Act is passed in order to protect the English silk industry

== Births ==
- Marquess of Dorset, nobleman and courtier (died 1501)
- John Spencer, landowner (died 1522)

== Deaths ==
- John Scrope, 4th Baron Scrope of Masham, politician (born 1388)
- Thomas de Strickland, soldier (born 1367)
- At the First Battle of St Albans (22 May)
  - Henry Percy, 2nd Earl of Northumberland, politician (born 1393)
  - Edmund Beaufort, 2nd Duke of Somerset, commander (born 1406)
  - Humphrey Stafford, Earl of Stafford (born 1425)
