= 1456 in England =

- Centuries: 13th; 14th; 15th; 16th; 17th
- Decades: 1430s; 1440s; 1450s; 1460s; 1470s
- See also: Other events of 1456

Events from the year 1456 in England.

== Incumbents ==
- Monarch – Henry VI
- Lord Chancellor – William Waynflete
- Lord Privy Seal – Lawrence Booth

== Events ==
- 25 February – Richard, Duke of York is dismissed as Lord Protector, effectively regent for the King, for the second time.
- April – A mutiny by the garrison of English Calais ends when wool merchants agree to back the garrison's pay.
- 17 August – Due to the political turbulence, the court moves to Coventry; Kenilworth Castle is strengthened as the King's principal residence.

== Births ==
- Anne Neville, queen of Richard III (died 1485)
- Ralph Neville, 3rd Earl of Westmorland, nobleman (died 1499)
- Roger Lupton, royal chaplain (died 1539
- William Brandon, soldier (died 1485)

== Deaths ==
- Edmund Tudor, 1st Earl of Richmond, father of King Henry VII of England (born c. 1430)
- Ralph de Cromwell, 3rd Baron Cromwell, soldier and diplomat (born 1393)
- Robert Dingley, politician (born 1377)
