= 1447 in England =

- Centuries: 13th; 14th; 15th; 16th; 17th
- Decades: 1420s; 1430s; 1440s; 1450s; 1460s
- See also: Other events of 1447

Events from the year 1447 in England.

== Incumbents ==
- Monarch – Henry VI
- Lord Chancellor – John Stafford
- Lord Privy Seal – Andrew Holes

== Events ==
- 18 February – Humphrey, Duke of Gloucester is arrested for treason. He dies five days later.
- 9 December – Richard, Duke of York is appointed as the King's representative in Ireland.
- Unknown – Wye College is founded in Kent.

== Births ==
- Richard Nykke, bishop (died 1535)
- Lionel Woodville, bishop (died 1484)

== Deaths ==
- Humphrey, Duke of Gloucester (born 1390)
- Henry Beaufort, Cardinal, Lord Chancellor (born 1377)
- John Holland, 2nd Duke of Exeter (born 1395)
