= 1448 in England =

- Centuries: 13th; 14th; 15th; 16th; 17th
- Decades: 1420s; 1430s; 1440s; 1450s; 1460s
- See also: Other events of 1448

Events from the year 1448 in England.

== Incumbents ==
- Monarch – Henry VI
- Lord Chancellor – John Stafford
- Lord Privy Seal – Adam Moleyns

== Events ==
- 11 March – Hundred Years' War: England cedes Maine to France.
- 16 March – Hundred Years' War: peace negotiations break down over the issue of English control over Brittany.
- 23 October – Scottish victory over the English at the Battle of Sark.
- Queen Margaret of Anjou founds Queens' College, Cambridge.
- Earliest known reference to Morris dancing in England.
- The Sunday Fairs Act is passed.
- The Worshipful Company of Haberdashers receives its royal charter

== Births ==
- John Talbot, 3rd Earl of Shrewsbury, nobleman (died 1473)
- Richard Pynson, printer (died 1529)

== Deaths ==
- William Aleyn, pirate (unknown)
