= 1430s in England =

Events from the 1430s in England.

== Incumbents ==
- Monarch – Henry VI

== Events ==
- 1430
  - 23 May – Hundred Years' War: following the Siege of Compiègne, Joan of Arc is captured and imprisoned.
  - June – Henry VI of England establishes his court in Rouen in preparation for his coronation as King of France.
  - The right to vote in elections to the House of Commons of England in the shires is restricted to Forty Shilling Freeholders, which remains the sole qualification in England until 1832.
- 1431
  - May – Humphrey, Duke of Gloucester, crushes a Lollard uprising in Oxfordshire, led by 'Jack Sharp'.
  - 30 May – Joan of Arc is burnt at the stake in Rouen following her trial.
  - 16 December – Henry VI crowned King of France in Paris.
- 1432
  - 9 February – financial crisis following the expense of two coronations.
- 1433
  - Winter – much of the town of Alnwick in Northumbria is burnt by a Scottish raiding party.
- 1434
  - 23 November – the River Thames freezes between London Bridge and Gravesend, Kent.
  - Revolts against English rule in Normandy.
- 1435
  - 21 September – Hundred Years' War: after the Congress of Arras, England's alliance with Burgundy against France comes to an end.
  - Enea Piccolomini, the future Pope Pius II, is sent by Cardinal Albergati on a secret mission to Scotland and the north of England.
- 1436
  - 13 April – Hundred Years' War: the French retake Paris from the English.
  - 25 June – The Incorporated Guild of Smiths in Newcastle upon Tyne is founded.
  - 10 September – Scottish defeat the English at the Battle of Piperdean.
- 1437
  - 12 February – Hundred Years' War: English forces under John Talbot capture Pontoise.
  - 16 November – King Henry VI comes of age and takes over the rule of England and its possessions.
  - Almshouses and school established at Ewelme in Oxfordshire by William de la Pole, 1st Duke of Suffolk and his wife Alice (née Chaucer). By the 21st century this will form the earliest school building in the United Kingdom still in use as a local authority school.
- 1438
  - 10 February – Foundation of All Souls' College, Oxford, as a graduate institution.
  - 28 April – Completion of Margery Kempe's The Book of Margery Kempe, the first known English autobiography, begins (by dictation).
- 1439
  - 2 July – Hundred Years' War: peace negotiations at Gravelines fail when Henry continues to insist on his right to the French throne.
  - 13 September – Hundred Years' War: Meaux surrenders to the French.
  - 12 November – Plymouth becomes the first town incorporated by Parliament.

== Births ==
- 1430
  - 27 June – Henry Holland, 3rd Duke of Exeter, Lancastrian leader during the Wars of the Roses (died 1475)
  - 28 October – Richard West, 7th Baron De La Warr, politician (died 1475)
- 1431 (approximate date)
  - William Hastings, 1st Baron Hastings (died 1483)
  - John Neville, 1st Marquess of Montagu, politician (died 1471)
- 1435
  - 8 April – John Clifford, 9th Baron Clifford, noble (killed in action 1461)
  - Thomas Stanley, 1st Earl of Derby (died 1504)
- 1436
  - 26 January – Henry Beaufort, 3rd Duke of Somerset, Lancastrian military commander during the Wars of the Roses (died 1464)
  - 5 November – Richard Grey, 3rd Earl of Tankerville, nobleman, Yorkist leader during the Wars of the Roses (died 1466)
- 1437
  - 22 July – John Scrope, 5th Baron Scrope of Bolton, nobleman (died 1498)
  - October? – Elizabeth Woodville, Queen consort of King Edward IV of England (died 1492)
- 1438
  - Probable date – Edmund Beaufort, 4th Duke of Somerset, nobleman and military commander during the Wars of the Roses (executed 1471)
- 1439
  - 10 August – Anne of York, Duchess of Exeter, Duchess of York, second child of Richard Plantagenet (died 1476)

== Deaths ==
- 1430
  - 18 August – Thomas de Ros, 8th Baron de Ros, soldier and politician (born 1406)
  - Thomas FitzAlan, nobleman (year of birth unknown)
- 1432
  - 19 October – John de Mowbray, 2nd Duke of Norfolk, politician (born 1392)
- 1435
  - 12 June – John FitzAlan, 14th Earl of Arundel, military leader (born 1408)
  - 9 September – Sir Robert Harling, Knight under the Duke of Bedford (year of birth unknown)
  - 14 September – John of Lancaster, 1st Duke of Bedford, regent of Henry VI in France (born 1389)
- 1437
  - 3 January – Catherine of Valois, queen of Henry V of England (born 1401)
- 1438
  - 24 April – Humphrey FitzAlan, 15th Earl of Arundel (born 1429)
  - 16 October – Anne of Gloucester, noblewoman (born 1383)
- 1439
  - 30 April – Richard de Beauchamp, 13th Earl of Warwick, military leader (born 1382)
