= 1480s in England =

Events from the 1480s in England. This decade marks the beginning of the Tudor period.

== Incumbents ==
- Monarch – Edward IV (until 9 April 1483), Edward V (9 April to 26 June 1483), Richard III (26 June 1483 to 22 August 1485), then Henry VII
- Regent – Richard, Duke of Gloucester (starting 30 April, until 26 June 1483)

== Events ==
- 1480
  - 1 August – Treaty of Perpetual Friendship between England and Burgundy.
  - Magdalen College School, Oxford, established by William Waynflete.
- 1481
  - William Caxton publishes The Historie of Reynart the Foxe, the first English edition of the tale, and also his 1480 translation of Mirrour of the Worlde, the first book printed in England to include woodcut illustrations.
  - 1481 or 1482 – Thomas de Littleton's Treatise on Tenures published posthumously, the first ever printed text on English law.
- 1482
  - June – Richard, Duke of Gloucester invades Scotland and captures Edinburgh.
  - 24 August – capture of Berwick: Scots surrender Berwick-upon-Tweed to Richard, ending his campaign; the town remains permanently English hereafter.
  - Act concerning Swans sets out that swans are the property of the monarch (or those given permission by him to own them).
- 1483
  - January – Act of Apparel, a sumptuary law, is passed.
  - 9 April – Edward IV dies at Westminster and his son, the 12-year-old Edward V, becomes king with his uncle the Duke of Gloucester acting as Lord Protector; the new king is proclaimed on 11 April.
  - 14 April – news of his father's death and his own accession reaches Edward V at Ludlow Castle. He leaves for London on 24 April.
  - 19 April – Edward IV is buried at St George's Chapel, Windsor Castle.
  - 30 April – the dowager queen's brother, Anthony Woodville, 2nd Earl Rivers, who has been escorting Edward to London, is arrested by Richard, Duke of Gloucester and Henry Stafford, 2nd Duke of Buckingham who proceed to Stony Stratford where they take over the escort of Edward.
  - 1 May – the dowager queen and others of her family take sanctuary at Westminster Abbey.
  - 4 May – the king enters London.
  - 13 June – summary execution at the Tower of London of William Hastings, 1st Baron Hastings for allegedly conspiring against the new Protector's life.
  - 25 June – execution at Pontefract Castle in Yorkshire of Anthony Woodville, 2nd Earl Rivers, Sir Richard Grey (the king's half-brother) and Sir Thomas Vaughan on false charges of conspiring against the new Protector's life.
  - 26 June – Richard becomes Richard III after Edward V is declared to be illegitimate by Parliament.
  - 6 July – coronation of Richard III at Westminster Abbey following a procession on the Thames.
  - Late Summer – disappearance of the Princes in the Tower, Edward V and Richard of Shrewsbury, Duke of York.
  - 8 September – the infant Edward of Middleham is invested as Prince of Wales by his father the king at the Archbishop's Palace in York.
  - October
    - The River Severn forms a new course at Gloucester, creating Alney Island.
    - A rebellion by Henry Stafford, 2nd Duke of Buckingham is crushed by Richard III.
  - 2 November – Buckingham executed at Salisbury.
  - William Caxton publishes his English translation of the Golden Legend, his most popular publication.
- 1484
  - January – Parliament passes the act Titulus Regius, bastardising the children of Edward IV and his wife, Elizabeth Woodville.
  - 2 March – a royal charter is granted to the College of Arms, the official English heraldic authority, established in London.
  - 26 March – William Caxton publishes his English translation of Aesop's Fables.
  - July – Richard III establishes a judicial Council of the North.
  - 21 September – Treaty of Nottingham: three-year truce between England and Scotland signed.
- 1485
  - 31 July – Thomas Malory's 1470 book Le Morte d'Arthur published by Caxton.
  - August – start of serious outbreak of sweating sickness.
  - 22 August
    - Wars of the Roses: Battle of Bosworth Field is fought in Leicestershire between the armies of King Richard III and rival claimant to the throne Henry Tudor, Earl of Richmond. Richard dies in battle and Henry becomes King Henry VII of England, ending the Middle Ages in England and beginning of the Tudor dynasty.
    - Creation of the Yeomen of the Guard.
  - 30 October – coronation of Henry VII at Westminster Abbey.
- 1486
  - 18 January – marriage of Henry VII and Elizabeth of York, Richard III's niece, uniting the House of Lancaster and the House of York, celebrated with a firework display.
  - April – Henry defeats the Stafford and Lovell rebellion.
  - 20 September – birth of Henry VII and Elizabeth of York's eldest son Arthur at Winchester.
  - 6 October – John Morton enthroned as Archbishop of Canterbury.
  - The Book of Saint Albans is published.
  - First recorded use of the word 'football' to describe a game in which the ball is kicked.
- 1487
  - 24 May – Lambert Simnel is crowned King "Edward VI of England" in Christchurch Cathedral, Dublin, Ireland. He claims to be Edward Plantagenet, 17th Earl of Warwick, Elizabeth of York's cousin, and on 5 June lands in Furness with an army to challenge Henry VII for the throne.
  - 16 June – Wars of the Roses: at the Battle of Stoke Field, the final battle of the conflict, the rebellion of pretender Lambert Simnel, led by John de la Pole, 1st Earl of Lincoln and Francis Lovell, 1st Viscount Lovell, is crushed by troops loyal to Henry VII.
  - 25 November – coronation of Elizabeth of York as Queen consort of England.
- 1488
  - The price of knitted woollen hats is fixed by law.
- 1489
  - 14 February – Treaty of Redon: England allies with Brittany against France.
  - 26 March – the Treaty of Medina del Campo between England and Spain includes provision for a marriage between Arthur, the son of King Henry VII, and Spanish princess Catherine of Aragon.
  - 28 April – Henry Percy, 4th Earl of Northumberland murdered by protesters against new war tax; revolt quickly suppressed.
  - 13 June – Battle of Dixmude: Anglo-Habsburg victory over France.
  - 29 November – Arthur Tudor is invested as Prince of Wales.
  - The Gold Sovereign is first issued.
  - King Henry VII gives a city charter to Southwold.

== Births ==
- 1482
  - Richard Pace, diplomat (died 1536)
- 1483
  - Thomas Parr, alleged oldest living man (died 1635)
- 1485
  - Hugh Aston, composer (died 1558)
  - Thomas Cromwell, 1st Earl of Essex, statesman (executed 1540)
  - John Russell, 1st Earl of Bedford, royal minister (died 1555)
- 1486
  - 20 September – Arthur, Prince of Wales, son of Henry VII of England (died 1502)
- 1487
  - Hugh Latimer, Protestant bishop (martyred 1555)
- 1488
  - Thomas Audley, 1st Baron Audley of Walden, Lord Chancellor (died 1544)
  - Myles Coverdale, Bible translator (died 1568)
- 1489
  - 2 July – Thomas Cranmer, Protestant Archbishop of Canterbury (martyred 1556)

== Deaths ==
- 1481
  - 23 August – Thomas de Littleton, judge and legal author (born c. 1407)
  - 19 November – Anne de Mowbray, 8th Countess of Norfolk (born 1472)
  - Mary Woodville, noblewoman (born c. 1454)
- 1482
  - 25 August – Margaret of Anjou, exiled queen consort of Henry VI (born 1430)
  - Approximate date – William Worcester, topographer, antiquary and chronicler (born 1415)
- 1483
  - 4 April – Henry Bourchier, 1st Earl of Essex (born c. 1405)
  - 9 April – King Edward IV of England (born 1442)
  - June – William Hastings, 1st Baron Hastings (executed) (born 1431)
  - 13 June – Richard Grey, knight, half brother of Edward V (executed) (born 1458)
  - 25 June – Anthony Woodville, 2nd Earl Rivers (executed) (born 1442)
  - 2 November – Henry Stafford, 2nd Duke of Buckingham, politician (born 1454)
  - George Nevill, Duke of Bedford, dispossessed nobleman (born 1465)
  - Edmund Sutton, nobleman (born 1425)
- 1484
  - 9 April – Edward of Middleham, Prince of Wales (born c. 1473)
  - 2 October – Isabel of Cambridge, Countess of Essex (born 1409)
- 1485
  - 16 March – Anne Neville, queen of Richard III of England (born 1456)
  - 22 August (killed at the Battle of Bosworth Field)
    - King Richard III of England (born 1452)
    - Robert Brackenbury courtier to Richard III (year of birth unknown)
    - William Brandon, supporter of Henry VII (born 1426)
    - John Howard, 1st Duke of Norfolk (born 1430)
    - Richard Ratcliffe, supporter of Richard III (year of birth unknown)
  - August – William Catesby, supporter of Richard III (executed) (born 1450)
  - 17 October – John Scott of Scott's Hall, Warden of the Cinque Ports (born c. 1423)
- 1486
  - 30 March – Thomas Bourchier, Archbishop of Canterbury and Lord Chancellor of England (born c. 1404)
  - 11 May – William Waynflete, Lord Chancellor and bishop of Winchester (born c. 1398)
  - 19 September – Richard Oldham, cleric (year of birth unknown)
- 1487
  - 16 June – John de la Pole, Earl of Lincoln (born c. 1463)
  - 30 September – John Sutton, 1st Baron Dudley, Lord Lieutenant of Ireland (born 1400)
  - William FitzAlan, 16th Earl of Arundel (born 1417)
- 1489
  - 28 April – Henry Percy, Earl of Northumberland (born c. 1449)
