= 1450s in England =

Events from the 1450s in England.

== Incumbents ==
- Monarch – Henry VI

== Events ==
- 1450
  - 9 January – Adam Moleyns, Bishop of Chichester and Lord Privy Seal is murdered in Portsmouth by discontented unpaid soldiers.
  - 7 February – John de la Pole marries Lady Margaret Beaufort.
  - 15 April – Hundred Years' War: French defeat the English at the Battle of Formigny.
  - 2 May – execution of William de la Pole, 1st Duke of Suffolk, while he is being sent into exile, being blamed for English losses in the Hundred Years' War.
  - 6 June–12 July – Jack Cade's Rebellion: Jack Cade leads a rebellion in Kent and Sussex against war taxes. On 29 June, William Ayscough, Bishop of Salisbury and confessor to the King, is dragged from mass at Edington Priory in Wiltshire and murdered by rebels.
  - 12 August – Hundred Years' War: Cherbourg surrenders to the French, allowing France to take control of all of Normandy.
  - September – Richard Plantagenet, 3rd Duke of York marches an army to London and attacks alleged traitors in the royal government.
  - Extension of Great Malvern Priory begins, with exceptional stained glass windows.
- 1451
  - June – at the insistence of Parliament, Henry cancels all land grants made during his reign.
  - 30 June – Hundred Years' War: Bordeaux surrenders to the French.
  - 21 August – Hundred Years' War: Bayonne surrenders to the French, ending English rule in Gascony.
  - September – the Duke of York refuses a royal summons to answer for breaking the peace.
- 1452
  - February – the Duke of York calls for armed resistance to King Henry VI.
  - 1–3 March – supporters of the Duke of York confront the royal army at Dartford. The Duke yields and is pardoned.
  - 21 July – John Kemp enthroned as Archbishop of Canterbury.
  - 22 October – Hundred Years' War: John Talbot, 2nd Earl of Shrewsbury re-captures Bordeaux; England regains control of much of Gascony.
- 1453
  - March – Parliament grants Henry generous taxes and condemns past rebels.
  - 17 July – Hundred Years' War: at the Battle of Castillon, the French under Jean Bureau defeat the English under the Earl of Shrewsbury, who is killed.
  - 10 August – The King becomes mentally unstable; his cousin Richard, Duke of York acts as regent. The king will be unaware of the birth of his only son, Edward, on 13 October.
  - 24 August – fighting in the north between the families of Richard Neville, 5th Earl of Salisbury and Henry Percy, 2nd Earl of Northumberland.
  - 19 October – The Hundred Years' War comes to a close, with the French recapture of Bordeaux leaving the English retaining only Calais on French soil.
- 1454
  - 15 March – Edward of Westminster invested as Prince of Wales.
  - 23 April – Thomas Bourchier enthroned as Archbishop of Canterbury, an office he will hold for almost 32 years.
  - June – the Duke of York suppresses a rebellion led by Henry Holland, 3rd Duke of Exeter in the north of England.
  - December – Henry VI recovers from his mental instability; the Duke of York is dismissed as regent.
- 1455
  - May – garrison at Calais mutinies over pay arrears.
  - 22 May – Wars of the Roses: Richard Plantagenet, 3rd Duke of York defeats the army of Henry VI at the First Battle of St Albans; Henry is captured.
  - 23 October – Bonville–Courtenay feud in Devon: Thomas Courtenay, heir to the Earl of Devon, arranges the murder of lawyer Nicholas Radford.
  - 19 November – the Duke of York is reinstated as regent.
  - November–December – Bonville–Courtenay feud leads to continued rioting and rebellion in Devon including sacking of Exeter and the first battle of Clyst Heath (15 December).
  - Earliest known reference to knitting in England.
- 1456
  - 25 February – Richard of York dismissed as regent for the second time.
  - April – Calais mutiny ends when wool merchants agree to back the garrison's pay.
  - 17 August – Court moves to Coventry; Kenilworth Castle strengthened as the King's principal residence.
- 1457
  - 1 January – Osmund of Salisbury (died 1099) is canonised, the last English saint created until the 20th century. His remains are translated from Old Sarum to Salisbury Cathedral on 23 July.
  - 28 August – French raiders sack Sandwich, Kent.
- 1458
  - 25 March (Feast of the Annunciation) – Loveday: Formal reconciliation between Yorkists and Lancastrians takes place at St Paul's Cathedral in London.
  - 15 July – foundation of Magdalen College, Oxford.
  - May – Richard Neville, 16th Earl of Warwick defeats a Spanish fleet in the English Channel.
- 1459
  - 23 September – Wars of the Roses: at the Battle of Blore Heath in Staffordshire, Yorkists under Richard Neville, 5th Earl of Salisbury defeat a Lancastrian force.
  - 12 October – Wars of the Roses: Lancastrian victory at the Battle of Ludford Bridge. Following the battle, the Duke of York flees to Ireland.
  - 10 November – Parliament of Devils, held at Coventry, condemns Yorkists as traitors.

== Births ==
- 1450
  - William Catesby, politician (died 1485)
- 1451
  - 5 March – William Herbert, 2nd Earl of Pembroke (died 1491)
  - 1 June – Giles Daubeney, 1st Baron Daubeney, soldier, diplomat, courtier and politician (d. 1508)
  - 5 September – Isabel Neville, Duchess of Clarence (died 1476)
- 1452
  - 2 October – Richard III, king of England (killed 1485)
  - Approximate date – Hugh Oldham, Bishop of Exeter and patron of education (died 1519)
- 1453
  - 13 October – Edward of Westminster, Prince of Wales, heir apparent to the English throne (killed 1471)
  - Approximate date – Thomas Grey, 1st Marquess of Dorset (died 1501)
- 1455
  - 4 September – Henry Stafford, 2nd Duke of Buckingham, politician (executed 1483)
- 1456
  - 11 June – Anne Neville, queen of Richard III (died 1485)
- 1457
  - 28 January – King Henry VII of England (died 1509)
  - Richard Grey, knight, half brother of Edward V (executed 1483)
  - Approximate date – Thomas West, 8th Baron De La Warr (died 1525)
- 1458
  - Approximate date – Thomas Docwra, Grand Prior of the English Knights Hospitaller (died 1527)
- 1459
  - Edward Poynings, Lord Deputy of Ireland to Henry VII (died 1521)

== Deaths ==
- 1450
  - 9 January – Adam Moleyns, Bishop of Chichester (murdered)
  - 2 May – William de la Pole, 1st Duke of Suffolk, military leader (born 1396; murdered)
  - 10 June – William Tresham, lawyer, Speaker of the House of Commons (born 1404; murdered)
  - 4 July – James Fiennes, 1st Baron Saye and Sele, soldier and politician (born c. 1395; murdered)
  - 28 July – Cecily Neville, Duchess of Warwick (born c. 1424)
  - 27 August – Reginald West, 6th Baron De La Warr, politician (born 1395)
- 1451
  - John Lydgate, monk and poet (born 1370)
- 1452
  - 26 May – John Stafford, Archbishop of Canterbury (year of birth unknown)
  - Nicholas Close, bishop (year of birth unknown)
- 1453
  - 17 July – John Talbot, 1st Earl of Shrewsbury, military leader (year of birth unknown)
  - 24 December – John Dunstaple, composer (born 1390)
- 1454
  - 22 March – John Kemp, Archbishop of Canterbury (born c. 1380)
  - Robert Wingfield, politician (born 1403)
- 1455
  - 22 May (at the First Battle of St Albans)
    - Henry Percy, 2nd Earl of Northumberland, politician (born 1393)
    - Edmund Beaufort, 2nd Duke of Somerset, commander (born 1406)
    - Humphrey Stafford, Earl of Stafford (born 1425)
  - 18 September – Edmund Lacey, Bishop of Exeter (year of birth unknown)
- 1456
  - 1 November – Edmund Tudor, 1st Earl of Richmond, father of King Henry VII of England (born c. 1430)
- 1459
  - 23 September – James Tuchet, 5th Baron Audley (born c. 1398) (killed in battle)
  - 5 November – John Fastolf, soldier (year of birth unknown)
