= 1410s in England =

Events from the 1410s in England.

== Incumbents ==
- Monarch – Henry IV (to 20 March 1413), then Henry V

== Events ==
- 1410
  - 27 January – the 8th Parliament of King Henry IV is opened, with Thomas Chaucer as Speaker of the House of Commons.
  - 31 January – Thomas Beaufort, Duke of Exeter becomes the new Lord Chancellor.
  - 9 May – Parliament closes its session for the year, and royal assent is given by Henry IV to various acts, including the Sealing of Cloths Act 1409 and the Unlawful Games Act.
  - Owain Glyndŵr continues his rebellion against England, although a costly English raid into rebel-held Shropshire is believed to have led to the capture of a number of rebel leaders.
- 1411
  - 3 November – Henry IV's 9th Parliament is assembled after being summoned by the King on 21 September, and again elects Thomas Chaucer as Speaker of the House of Commons.
  - 30 November – Henry IV dismisses Henry, Prince of Wales and his allies from the royal council.
  - 19 December – Royal assent is given by Henry IV to the acts passed by Parliament, including the Riot Act 1411, which provides that "The justices of peace and the sheriffs shall arrest those which commit any riot... and inquire of them, and record their offences."
  - 21 December – Henry IV issues pardons to all but two of the Welsh rebels in the Glyndŵr rebellion except for the leaders, Owain Glyndŵr and Thomas of Trumpington.
- 1412
  - May – England allies with the Armagnac party in return for help in regaining control of Aquitaine.
  - Owain Glyndŵr cuts through the King's men and captures, later ransoming, a leading Welsh supporter of King Henry's, Dafydd Gam, in an ambush in Brecon. However, this is the last time that Owain is seen by his enemies.
- 1413
  - 3 February – the 10th and final Parliament of King Henry IV (summoned on 1 December 1412) opens its session, but closes abruptly after six weeks because of the death of the King.
  - 20 March – Henry IV dies at Westminster Abbey, where Parliament has been meeting, and passes on while in the Jerusalem Chamber of the house of the Abbot, William de Colchester.
  - 21 March – Henry V becomes King following the death of his father Henry IV.
  - 22 March – King Henry V summons Parliament to meet at Westminster beginning on 14 May.
  - 9 April – coronation of King Henry V at Westminster Abbey in a snowstorm.
  - 9 June – Parliament closes as royal assent is given by Henry V to acts passed during the session, including the Corn Measure Act 1413 and the Parliamentary Elections Act 1413 that sets regulations for the qualification of men to be elected to the House of Commons.
  - 4 December – the remains of King Richard II (whom Henry V's father had overthrown and imprisoned in 1399) are moved from the grounds of Kings Langley Priory in Hertfordshire and reinterred at Westminster Abbey, the traditional final resting place of English monarchs, as a gesture of reconciliation by Henry V.
- 1414
  - 9 January – the Oldcastle Revolt, a Lollard rebellion in London, is suppressed.
  - 27 April – Henry Chichele is enthroned as Archbishop of Canterbury and Primate of All England.
  - 30 April – the second Parliament of Henry V (summoned on 1 December 1413) opens at Westminster and Walter Hungerford is elected as Speaker of the House of Commons.
  - 29 May – Parliament closes its session after 29 days, and Henry V gives royal assent to its acts.
  - August – Henry V claims the throne of France.
  - 19 November – the 3rd Parliament of Henry V opens at Westminster and passes laws including the Suppression of Heresy Act 1414, the Riot Act 1414, and the Safe Conducts Act 1414.
  - Durham School is founded as a grammar school by Thomas Langley, Prince-Bishop of Durham.
  - Alien priory cells are suppressed.
- 1415
  - 24 January – England and France agree to extend their truce in the ongoing Burgundian War after the Bishops of Durham and Norwich meet with representatives of Charles VI of France, prolonging a ceasefire until 1 May.
  - 4 May – the Council of Constance declares that English theologian John Wycliffe (died 1384) was a heretic and bans his writings.
  - 5 August – Southampton Plot to depose Henry V in favour of Edmund Mortimer, 5th Earl of March fails and the ringleaders are executed.
  - 13 August – Hundred Years' War: Henry V begins an invasion of Normandy.
  - 22 September – Hundred Years' War: English capture Harfleur.
  - 25 October – Hundred Years' War: Henry V is victorious over the French at the Battle of Agincourt.
  - 4 November – Parliament is opened by Henry V for an 8-day session.
  - 12 November – Parliament is closed after accomplishing the passage of the Money Act 1415, upgrading the penalty for importing or offering in payment "any sort of money forbidden by former statutes" to a felony.
  - Henry V offers a pardon to the fugitive Welsh rebel leader Owain Glyndŵr, but it is refused (he dies on 20 September (probably)).
  - Syon Abbey founded at Twickenham, the last new English monastery of the Middle Ages.
- 1416
  - 21 January – King Henry V summons the Parliament of England to meet in Westminster on 16 March.
  - 11 March – Hundred Years' War: The Battle of Valmont takes place in the neighboring towns of Valmont and Harfleur, as Thomas Beaufort, Duke of Exeter and his English Army troops inflict heavy casualties on a larger group of French.
  - 16 March – the Treason Act 1415 takes effect, making coin clipping a treasonable offense.
  - 1 May – Hundred Years' War: French fleet blockades Harfleur.
  - 3 May – Sigismund, King of Germany, travels to London, where he is welcomed by Henry V.
  - 2 June – Hundred Years' War: Truce of Harfleur between England and France comes to an end after 27 days, and a French siege of Harfleur begins again on 5 June.
  - 6 June – the Convocation of Canterbury, to investigate and charge the participants in the 1414 Oldcastle Revolt, ends after more than two months.
  - 20 June – Hundred Years' War: Raoul de Gaucourt and Regnault de Chartres, held prisoners of war in England since being captured during the siege of Harfleur, are paroled in order to serve as England's emissaries to begin discussions of a truce with King Charles VI of France.
  - 1 July – Henry Chichele, Archbishop of Canterbury, begins the first of his semiannual inquisitions, directing archdeacons to seek out heretics and bring them to trial.
  - 15 August
    - Hundred Years' War: Harfleur relieved, following a naval battle in the estuary of the Seine.
    - Sigismund, King of Germany, and Henry conclude the Treaty of Canterbury, an alliance of the two nations against France.
  - 3 September – Henry V summons the Parliament of England for the third time in less than a year, directing the MPs to assemble on 19 October.
  - 19 October – the Parliament of England is opened by the King. The House of Commons elects Roger Flower as its Speaker.
- 1417
  - 2 June – Henry V issues an order directing penalties for wearing of an unauthorized coat of arms, directing sheriffs, on the day of mustering of persons for an exhibition, to inquire in such cases "by whose gift he holds those arms or coats of arms, except for those who bore arms with us at the Battle of Aguincourt."
  - 29 June – an English fleet, led by the Earl of Huntingdon, defeats a fleet of Genoese carracks and captures their admiral, the "Bastard of Bourbon".
  - 23 July – Hundred Years' War: Henry V leads an army of 12,000 men on a new invasion of Normandy.
  - 12 August – Henry V begins writing his official correspondence in English, marking the beginning of its restoration as the official language of government in England.
  - 8 September – Hundred Years' War: English capture Caen.
  - 16 November – Parliament (summoned on 5 October) opens at Westminster for a 31-day session and re-elects Roger Flower as Speaker of the House of Commons.
  - 14 December – in punishment for his conviction for high treason against the Crown, Sir John Oldcastle, Baron Cobham, is hanged outside the London church of St Giles in the Fields and then (carrying out the sentence for a prior conviction of heresy) burned, "gallows and all".
  - 17 December – Parliament closes and Henry V gives royal assent to its one major law, the Attorney Act 1417, which provides that "All persons until the next parliament may make their attornies in wapentakes, hundreds, and court barons."
  - John Capgrave writes his Chronicle, a history of England since the creation.
- 1418
  - 18 February – Hundred Years' War: English capture Falaise.
  - 12 July – England approves and signs the Concordats of Constance.
  - 29 July – Hundred Years' War: English Siege of Rouen begins.
  - 22 August – Hundred Years' War: English capture Cherbourg.
- 1419
  - 19 January – Hundred Years' War: Rouen falls to the English, who take control of Normandy.
  - 29 May – Henry V is betrothed to Princess Catherine of Valois, the 17-year-old daughter of King Charles VI of France, in negotiations in the neutral site of Pontoise, north of Paris, during a halt to hostilities in the war between the two kingdoms. Henry and Catherine will marry a little more than a year later, on June 2, 1420.
  - 30 July – Hundred Years' War: English capture Pontoise.
  - 13 October – Richard Whittington is elected Lord Mayor of London for the last time.
  - 16 October – the first session in almost two years of Parliament (summoned on 24 August) is opened by Henry V. The House of Commons re-elects Roger Flower as its speaker. The session closes on 13 November.
  - 25 December – Hundred Years' War: Philip the Good, Duke of Burgundy, allies with England against France.

== Births ==
- 1411
  - 21 September – Richard Plantagenet, 3rd Duke of York, claimant to the throne (died 1460)
- 1415
  - 3 May – Cecily Neville, mother of Edward IV of England and Richard III of England (died 1495)
  - 12 September – John de Mowbray, 3rd Duke of Norfolk, Duke (died 1461)
  - William Worcester, topographer, antiquary and chronicler (died c. 1482)
- 1416
  - 26 October – Edmund Grey, 1st Earl of Kent (died 1490)
- 1417
  - 23 November – William FitzAlan, 9th Earl of Arundel, politician (died 1487)

== Deaths ==
- 1410
  - 16 March – John Beaufort, 1st Earl of Somerset (born c. 1373)
  - 13 September – Isabella of Valois, queen consort of England (born 1389, France)
  - John Badby, martyr (year of birth unknown)
  - John Gower, poet (born c. 1330)
- 1411
  - September – Anne de Mortimer, Countess of Cambridge (born 1390)
- 1412
  - Walter Froucester, Abbot of Gloucester
- 1413
  - 25 January – Maud de Ufford, Countess of Oxford (born 1345)
  - 20 March – King Henry IV (born 1367)
- 1414
  - 19 February – Thomas Arundel, Archbishop of Canterbury (born 1353)
  - 1 September – William de Ros, 6th Baron de Ros, Lord Treasurer (born 1369)
- 1415
  - 19 July – Philippa of Lancaster, queen of John I of Portugal (plague) (born 1359)
  - 5 August – Southampton Plot ringleaders (executed)
    - Richard of Conisburgh, 3rd Earl of Cambridge (born c. 1375)
    - Thomas Grey (born 1384)
    - Henry Scrope, 3rd Baron Scrope of Masham (born c. 1376)
  - August or September – Michael de la Pole, 2nd Earl of Suffolk (killed in battle) (born 1367)
  - 13 October – Thomas FitzAlan, 12th Earl of Arundel, English military leader (born 1381)
  - 25 October (Battle of Agincourt)
    - Michael de la Pole, 3rd Earl of Suffolk (born 1394)
    - Edward of Norwich, 2nd Duke of York (born 1373)
- 1417
  - 4 September – Robert Hallam, Bishop of Salisbury (year of birth unknown)
  - 14 December – John Oldcastle, Lollard leader (year of birth unknown)
- 1418
  - 25 November – Henry Beaufort, 2nd Earl of Somerset (born 1401)
- 1419
  - 3 September – Edmund Stafford, Bishop of Exeter and Lord Chancellor of England (born 1344)
  - 17 December – William Gascoigne, Chief Justice (born c. 1350)
