= 1470s in England =

Events from the 1470s in England.

== Incumbents ==
- Monarch – Edward IV (until 3 October 1470), Henry VI (3 October 1470 to 11 April 1471), then Edward IV
- Regent – Edward, Prince of Wales (starting c. 4 July, until c. 20 September 1475)

== Events ==
- 1470
  - 12 March – Wars of the Roses: House of York defeats rebel forces allied with Richard Neville, 16th Earl of Warwick at the Battle of Losecoat Field.
  - 20 March – the Battle of Nibley Green (in Gloucestershire) is the last fought between the private armies of feudal magnates in England.
  - 2 October – Wars of the Roses: a rebellion orchestrated by King Edward IV's former ally the Earl of Warwick forces the King to flee England and seek support from his brother-in-law Charles the Bold of Burgundy.
  - 6 October – Warwick releases Henry VI from the Tower of London and restores him to the throne.
- 1471
  - 14 March – Edward lands with a small force at Ravenspur in Yorkshire.
  - 11 April – London surrenders to Edward.
  - 14 April – Wars of the Roses
    - At the Battle of Barnet, Edward defeats the Lancastrian army under Warwick, who is killed.
    - Queen Margaret returns to England, landing at Weymouth, Dorset.
  - 4 May – Wars of the Roses: at the Battle of Tewkesbury, King Edward defeats a Lancastrian army under Queen Margaret and her son, Edward of Westminster the Prince of Wales, who is killed.
  - 21 May – Henry VI is murdered in the Tower of London.
  - 3 July – Edward's brother, Richard of Gloucester becomes Constable and Admiral of England, with power over the north of the country.
- 1472
  - 3 July – York Minster completed and consecrated.
  - Council of the North established by Edward IV, having at this time its chief headquarters at Sheriff Hutton Castle and Sandal Castle in Yorkshire.
  - By the Statute of Westminster, every ship entering an English port has to bring in four bowstaves for every tun.
  - Half-angel coin introduced.
- 1473
  - 28 May – John de Vere, 13th Earl of Oxford raids Essex coastline, in support of the Lancastrians.
  - 30 September – Earl of Oxford captures St Michael's Mount in Cornwall.
  - Council of Wales and the Marches first meets.
- 1474
  - 14 February – Earl of Oxford surrenders and is pardoned but imprisoned.
  - July – Treaty of London – England allies with Burgundy against France.
  - September – Peace of Utrecht negotiates trade concessions between England and the Hanseatic League.
  - The Lord Chancellor issues the first decree in his own name, beginning the independence of the Court of Chancery from the Curia regis.
  - "Warkworth's" Chronicle concludes.
- 1475
  - 4 July – Burgundian Wars: Edward IV lands in Calais in support of Burgundy against France.
  - 29 August – by the Treaty of Picquigny, France pays England compensation in return for peace and agrees to ransom Margaret of Anjou.
  - Recuyell of the Historyes of Troye is the first book to be printed in English, by William Caxton in Bruges (or 1473–74?)
  - Construction begins on the new hall of Eltham Palace.
- 1476
  - William Caxton sets up the first printing press in England at Westminster.
- 1477
  - 18 November – Caxton prints Earl Rivers' translation of Dictes or Sayengis of the Philosophres, the first full-length book printed in England on a printing press.
  - A new law bans two forms of skittles, and a ball game referred to as "hand in, hand out".
- 1478
  - 15 January – Richard of Shrewsbury, 1st Duke of York, aged four, is married to five-year-old Anne de Mowbray, 8th Countess of Norfolk.
  - 18 February – George Plantagenet, 1st Duke of Clarence, convicted of treason against his older brother Edward IV of England, is privately executed in the Tower of London on the order of the King.
  - 17 December – first book printed in Oxford.
  - Chapel and cloister of Magdalen College, Oxford completed, by architect William Orchard.
  - William Caxton publishes the first printed copy of Canterbury Tales.
- 1479
  - The St Albans Press, the third printing press in England, is set up in the Abbey Gateway, St. Albans.
  - Robert Ricart begins writing The Maire of Bristowe is Kalendar in Bristol.

== Births ==
- 1470
  - 7 April – Edward Stafford, 2nd Earl of Wiltshire (died 1498)
  - 4 November – King Edward V of England, one of the Princes in the Tower (probably murdered 1483?)
- 1471
  - John Forest, Franciscan friar (martyred 1538)
  - Approximate date – Edmund de la Pole, 3rd Duke of Suffolk (executed 1513)
- 1472
  - 10 December – Anne de Mowbray, 8th Countess of Norfolk (died 1481)
- 1473
  - 14 August – Margaret Pole, Countess of Salisbury, courtier (executed 1541)
  - 17 August – Richard of Shrewsbury, Duke of York, one of the Princes in the Tower (probably murdered 1483?)
  - Thomas Howard, 3rd Duke of Norfolk, Tudor politician (died 1555)
  - Edward of Middleham, Prince of Wales, only son of Richard III of England (died 1484)
- 1474
  - Cuthbert Tunstall, prince-bishop of Durham and diplomat (died 1559)
  - approximate date
    - Edward Guildford, Lord Warden of the Cinque Ports (died 1534)
    - Stephen Hawes, poet (died c. 1523)
    - Humphrey Kynaston, highwayman (d. 1534)
    - John Seymour, courtier (died 1536)
    - Perkin Warbeck, pretender to the throne (executed 1499)
- 1475
  - 25 February – Edward, Earl of Warwick, last male member of the House of York (executed 1499)
  - Thomas West, 9th Baron De La Warr (died 1554)
  - John Stokesley, bishop of London (died 1539)
- 1477
  - Lambert Simnel, pretender to the throne (died c. 1534)
  - Thomas Boleyn, Earl of Wiltshire, diplomat (died 1539)
- 1478
  - 3 February – Edward Stafford, 3rd Duke of Buckingham (executed 1521)
  - 7 February – Thomas More, statesman and humanist (executed 1535)
  - Thomas Ashwell, composer (approximate date; year of death unknown)
- 1479
  - 14 August – Catherine of York, aunt of Henry VIII of England (died 1527)
  - Henry Stafford, 1st Earl of Wiltshire (died 1523)

== Deaths ==
- 1471
  - 14 March – Thomas Malory, author (born c. 1405)
  - 14 April
    - John Neville, 1st Marquess of Montagu (born 1431)
    - Richard Neville, 16th Earl of Warwick, kingmaker (born 1428)
  - 4 May – Edward of Westminster (killed in battle) (born 1453)
  - 6 May
    - Edmund Beaufort, 4th Duke of Somerset (executed) (born 1438)
    - Thomas Tresham, Speaker of the House of Commons (year of birth unknown)
  - 21 May – King Henry VI of England (born 1421)
- 1473
  - 8 May – John Stafford, 1st Earl of Wiltshire, politician (born 1420)
- 1474
  - William Canynge, merchant (born c. 1399)
  - Walter Frye, composer (year of birth unknown)
- 1475
  - 10 March – Richard West, 7th Baron De La Warr (born 1430)
  - 20 May – Alice de la Pole, Duchess of Suffolk, courtier and patron of the arts (born c. 1404)
- 1476
  - 14 January – John de Mowbray, 4th Duke of Norfolk (born 1444)
  - 20 May – Isabel Ingoldisthorpe, noblewoman (born 1441).
  - 8 June – George Neville, archbishop and statesman (born c. 1432)
  - 22 December – Isabella Neville, duchess (born 1451)
- 1478
  - 18 February – George Plantagenet, 1st Duke of Clarence, brother of Edward IV of England and Richard III of England (executed) (born 1449)
