= Battle of Sandwich =

Battle of Sandwich may refer to the following naval battles:

- Battle of Sandwich (851), between the West Saxons led by Æthelstan and the Danish Vikings
- Battle of Sandwich (1217), also called the Battle of Dover, part of the First Barons' War
- Battle of Sandwich (1460), during the Wars of the Roses
