= 1420s in England =

Events from the 1420s in England.

== Incumbents ==
- Monarch – Henry V (to 31 August 1422), then Henry VI

== Events ==
- 1420
  - 14 February – Lollard William Taylor is acquitted of charges of heresy in a trial before the Archbishop of Canterbury, Henry Chichele. Taylor will in 1423 be convicted of heresy and burned at the stake.
  - 21 May – Henry V of England and Charles VI of France sign the Treaty of Troyes, making Henry heir to the French throne.
  - 2 June – Henry marries Catherine of Valois, Charles's daughter.
  - 17 November – Hundred Years' War: Melun surrenders to the English.
  - 2 December – the 9th Parliament of King Henry V of England (summoned on 21 October) is opened at Westminster, and selects Roger Hunt as Speaker of the House of Commons.
  - Henry's flagship, the Grace Dieu, makes her only known service voyage, across The Solent, occasioning mutinies.
- 1421
  - 23 February – coronation of Catherine of Valois as queen consort in Westminster Abbey.
  - 21 March – Hundred Years' War: English defeated by the French and Scottish at the Battle of Baugé in Normandy. Thomas of Lancaster, Duke of Clarence, Henry V's brother and heir to the throne, is killed.
  - 8 April – Maredudd ab Owain Glyndŵr, son of the late Welsh rebel Owain Glyndŵr, accepts a pardon from, and swears loyalty to Henry V, formally bringing an end to the Glyndŵr rebellion.
  - 10 June – one year after returning home for his marriage, Henry V sails back to France with new troops to continue fighting in the Hundred Years War.
  - 1 December – the 11th and last Parliament of Henry V (summoned on 20 October) assembles at Westminster and elects Richard Baynard as Speaker of the House of Commons.
  - Collegiate church licensed in Manchester, the origin of Manchester Cathedral.
- 1422
  - 10 May – Hundred Years' War: Siege of Meaux – Meaux surrenders to the English.
  - 31 August – Henry V dies at the Château de Vincennes.
  - 1 September – Henry VI is proclaimed King of England, aged nine months, on the death of his father Henry V. His uncle Humphrey, Duke of Gloucester, acts as his regent in England.
  - 21 October – Henry VI is proclaimed King of France in Paris following the death of Charles VI, under the terms of the Treaty of Troyes. His uncle John of Lancaster, 1st Duke of Bedford, was proclaimed as regent in France by Henry V shortly before his death.
  - 30 October – Charles the dauphin defies the Treaty of Troyes to be declared Charles VII of France in Bourges.
  - 7 November – after being returned to England from France, and then being taken on a two-day journey from Southwark to Temple Bar and thence to London, the body of the late King Henry V is buried at Westminster Abbey.
  - 9 November – at the opening of the English Parliament (summoned on 29 September by the regent John of Lancaster, Duke of Bedford), the House of Commons elects Roger Flower as its speaker.
  - 9 December – Regency government, 1422–1437: the Regency Council of the infant Henry VI assembles for the first time with 18 nobles, led by John of Lancaster, Duke of Bedford, the uncle of the King and the brother of the late King Henry V. Because Bedford serves primarily in France to command English forces there in the ongoing war, another uncle, Humphrey, Duke of Gloucester, leads the regency most of the time during the King's minority.
  - 18 December – as Parliament closes, the regents for King Henry VI give royal assent to new legislation that has been passed during the 39-day session, including the Irishmen Act setting requirements for "What sort of Irishmen only may come to dwell in England"; the Purveyance Act 1422 ("All the statutes of purveyors shall be proclaimed in every county four times in the year") relating to the royal household's purchase of provisions at a regulated price and the requistioning of horses and vehicles for royal use; and for "A certain allowance made to those which were retained to serve King Henry V. in his wars".
- 1423
  - 13 April – Hundred Years' War: Treaty of Amiens – England allies with Burgundy and Brittany against France.
  - 31 July – Hundred Years' War: the English defeat the French and Scottish at the Battle of Cravant.
  - 26 September – Hundred Years' War: the Battle of La Brossinière is fought in France near Bourgon. The English force under the command of Sir John De la Pole is crushed by the armies of France, Anjou and Maine, with around half its strength killed.
  - 28 September – the English nobility swear their loyalty to the infant king.
  - 20 October – the Second Parliament of Henry VI (summoned on 1 September) assembles. The House of Commons, led by John Russell, will consider laws until its adjournment on 28 February 28.
  - 16 November – on behalf of the infant king, John of Lancaster, Duke of Bedford, Regent for France, confirms the 1315 Charter to the Normans.
  - 17 November – three weeks before his second birthday, Henry VI is brought before the assembled members of the House of Lords and the House of Commons for the first time.
- 1424
  - 12 February – while negotiating his release from captivity in England, King James I of Scotland is married to English noblewoman Joan Beaufort in Southwark Priory.
  - 28 March – James I of Scotland is released after having been held captive in England since 1406 and after putting his royal seal on a ransom treaty of £40,000, secured by Scottish hostages taking his place, as agreed at Durham.
  - 5 April – James I returns to Scotland, being escorted to the border along with his wife by English and Scottish nobles. (He will be crowned at Scone on 21 May.)
  - 17 August – Hundred Years' War: the English led by the Duke of Bedford defeat the French and Scottish at the Battle of Verneuil.
  - 16 October – the Duke of Gloucester invades Hainault in the Low Countries; the king's great-uncle Henry Beaufort, Bishop of Winchester, newly restored to the position of Lord Chancellor, takes control of government in England.
- 1425
  - April – Duke of Gloucester abandons his failed invasion of Hainault.
  - 30 April – the Third Parliament of Henry VI (summoned on 12 March) opens at Westminster for a session of almost three months. Thomas Walton is elected as Speaker of the House of Commons.
  - 14 July – the Parliament of England closes as Henry VI gives royal assent to the Labourers Act 1425, the River Lee Navigation Act 1425 and laws requiring a royal licenses for exportation of sheep, butter and cheese.
  - 10 August – Hundred Years' War: Le Mans surrenders to the English.
  - 30 October – Henry Beaufort, Bishop of Winchester and Lord Chancellor, although a member of the regency government, tries to occupy London.
- 1426
  - 15 January – England declares war against the Duchy of Brittany and the Kingdom of France after John V, Duke of Brittany (Jean le Sage) allies with France's King Charles VI.
  - 18 February – the Parliament of England (summoned on 7 January) is opened by the infant King Henry VI at Leicester Castle. This becomes known as the Parliament of Bats because Humphrey, Duke of Gloucester, the king's uncle and regent, prohibits the members from carrying swords (because of tensions with Henry Beaufort) and they arm themselves with clubs to defend themselves. The House of Commons elects Richard Vernon as its speaker.
  - 6 March – Hundred Years' War: After being besieged since February 27 in Saint-James (near Avranches in Normandy), a 600-strong force of English knights led by Sir Thomas Rempston routs a 16,000-strong French and Breton force under Arthur de Richemont, Constable of France, in the Battle of Saint-James. This forces the Duke of Brittany (Richemont's brother) to offer a truce and on September 8 to acknowledge Henry VI's suzerainty over France.
  - 12 March – Henry Beaufort resigns at the Parliament of Bats as Lord Chancellor and leaves the country, being replaced by John Kemp. Beaufort is created a Cardinal.
  - 1 June – the Parliament of Bats closes; among the laws given royal assent are a provision that writs and lawsuits against people who were later given knighthood "shall not abate for that cause," and another giving "licence to all the King's subjects to transport corn.
- 1427
  - 15 July–5 September – Hundred Years' War: Siege of Montargis – The French rout an English force led by Richard Beauchamp, Earl of Warwick.
  - 13 October
    - Lincoln College, Oxford, is founded by Richard Fleming, Bishop of Lincoln.
    - Parliament assembles at Westminster after being summoned on 15 July by the Regency Council. John Tyrrell is elected as Speaker of the House of Commons.
- 1428
  - 12 October – Hundred Years' War: English commence the Siege of Orléans.
  - Cardinal Henry Beaufort returns to England and preaches a crusade against the Hussites.
  - Earliest likely date for marriage of Catherine of Valois, widow of Henry V, to Welsh courtier Owen Tudor (contrary to a recently passed statute probibiting remarriage of a dowager queen), thus establishing the House of Tudor.
  - The remains of theologian John Wycliffe (died 1384 and declared a heretic in 1415) are exhumed from his burial place in Lutterworth, burned and the ashes thrown in the River Swift.
- 1429
  - 12 February – Hundred Years' War: at the Battle of the Herrings, English forces under Sir John Fastolf defend a supply convoy carrying rations to the army of William de la Pole, 4th Earl of Suffolk at Orléans from attack by the Comte de Clermont and John Stuart.
  - 8 May – Hundred Years' War: the French under Joan of Arc lift the Siege of Orléans.
  - 11–12 June – Hundred Years' War: the French defeat the English at the Battle of Jargeau.
  - 15 June – Hundred Years' War: the French defeat the English at the Battle of Meung-sur-Loire.
  - 16–17 June – Hundred Years' War: the French defeat the English at the Battle of Beaugency.
  - 18 June – Hundred Years' War: the French defeat the English at the Battle of Patay.
  - 6 November – coronation of 7-year-old King Henry VI as king of England at Westminster Abbey.

== Births ==
- 1420
  - 24 November – John Stafford, 1st Earl of Wiltshire, politician (died 1473)
- 1421
  - 25 July – Henry Percy, 3rd Earl of Northumberland, politician (died 1461)
  - 6 December – King Henry VI of England (died 1471)
- 1422
  - probable – William Caxton, printer (died c. 1491)
- 1423
  - 24 August – Thomas Rotherham, cleric (died 1500)
- 1425
  - date unknown – Edmund Sutton, nobleman (died 1483)
- 1426
  - date unknown
    - William Brandon, nobleman (died 1485)
    - Anne Neville, Countess of Warwick (died 1492)
- 1427
  - 9 September – Thomas de Ros, 10th Baron de Ros, politician (died 1464)
- 1428
  - 22 November – Richard Neville, 16th Earl of Warwick, kingmaker (died 1471)
- 1429
  - 30 January – Humphrey FitzAlan, 15th Earl of Arundel (died 1438)
  - 23 March – Margaret of Anjou, queen of Henry VI of England (died 1482)

== Deaths ==
- 1421
  - 22 March – Thomas of Lancaster, 1st Duke of Clarence, second son of Henry IV of England (killed in battle) (born 1388)
  - date unknown – John FitzAlan, 13th Earl of Arundel (born 1385)
- 1422
  - 31 August – King Henry V of England (born 1386)
  - probable – Thomas Walsingham, chronicler (year of birth unknown)
- 1423
  - 20 October – Henry Bowet, Archbishop of York (year of birth unknown)
  - date unknown – Richard Whittington, Lord Mayor of London (born 1358)
- 1424
  - 17 May – Bertram Fitzalan, Carmelite theologian
  - John Clopton, Member of Parliament for Gloucester
  - William Ickham, Member of Parliament for Canterbury
  - John Persons, Member of Parliament for Wiltshire
- 1425
  - 18 January – Edmund Mortimer, 5th Earl of March, politician (born 1391)
  - 8 July – Lady Elizabeth FitzAlan (born 1366)
- 1426
  - March/May – Thomas Hoccleve, English poet (born c. 1368)
  - 24 November – Elizabeth of Lancaster, Duchess of Exeter, Plantagenet noblewoman, daughter of John of Gaunt (born c. 1363)
  - 31 December – Thomas Beaufort, 1st Duke of Exeter, military leader (born c. 1377)
- 1427
  - 7 May – Thomas la Warr, 5th Baron De La Warr, churchman (born c. 1352)
  - 27 August – Reginald West, 6th Baron De La Warr (born 1395)
- 1428
  - 3 November – Thomas Montacute, 4th Earl of Salisbury, military leader (mortally wounded at the Siege of Orleans, the first prominent English victim of ordnance) (born 1388)
  - probable – John Purvey, theologian (born 1353)
- 1429
  - 30 December – Margaret Holland, noblewoman (born 1385)
