= 1440s in England =

Events from the 1440s in England.

== Incumbents ==
- Monarch – Henry VI

== Events ==
- 1440
  - 7 July – Hundred Years' War: John Talbot, 1st Earl of Shrewsbury recaptures Harfleur from the French.
  - 12 September – King Henry VI founds Eton College.
- 1441
  - 2 April – King Henry VI founds King's College, Cambridge.
  - 19 September – Hundred Years' War: French capture Pontoise and Île-de-France.
- 1442
  - 19 January – Eleanor Cobham, wife of Humphrey, Duke of Gloucester, convicted of treason and witchcraft.
  - 11 June – Hundred Years' War: France invades Gascony.
- 1443
  - 23 April – perpetual truce signed with Burgundy.
  - 13 May – John Stafford enthroned as Archbishop of Canterbury.
  - August – Hundred Years' War: 8,000 strong expeditionary force under John Beaufort, 1st Duke of Somerset lands at Cherbourg.
- 1444
  - 22 May – the Treaty of Tours, signed between England and France, secures a truce in the Hundred Years' War for 5 years and includes an arrangement for Henry VI to marry Margaret of Anjou.
  - A serious fire occurs at Old St Paul's Cathedral in London.
- 1445
  - 23 April – Henry VI marries Margaret of Anjou at Titchfield Abbey.
  - 14 July – Hundred Years' War: negotiations for a peace treaty begin in London.
- 1446
  - 26 June – Hundred Years' War: Henry re-asserts his claim over Brittany.
  - 25 July – Henry lays the foundation stone of King's College Chapel, Cambridge.
- 1447
  - 18 February – Duke of Gloucester arrested for treason. He dies five days later.
  - 9 December – Richard Plantagenet, 3rd Duke of York appointed as the King's representative in Ireland.
- 1448
  - 11 March – Hundred Years' War: England cedes Maine to France.
  - 16 March – Hundred Years' War: peace negotiations break down over the issue of English control over Brittany.
  - 15 April – Queen Margaret of Anjou founds Queens' College, Cambridge.
  - May – Earliest known reference to Morris dance in England.
  - 23 October – Scottish victory over the English at the Battle of Sark.
- 1449
  - 24 March – Hundred Years' War: English capture Fougères in Brittany.
  - May – An English privateering fleet led by Robert Wennington challenges ships of the Hanseatic League.
  - July – Hundred Years' War: French invade Normandy.
  - 29 October – Hundred Years' War: Rouen surrenders to the French.
  - Earliest known grant of a patent in England, by Henry VI to John of Utynam for the introduction of coloured glass manufacture.

== Births ==
- 1440
  - approximate Henry Deane, Archbishop of Canterbury (died 1503)
- 1442
  - 28 April – King Edward IV of England (died 1483)
  - 27 September – John de la Pole, 2nd Duke of Suffolk (died 1491)
  - Anthony Woodville, 2nd Earl Rivers (died 1483)
- 1443
  - 17 May – Edmund, Earl of Rutland, brother of Kings Edward IV of England and Richard III of England (died 1460)
  - 31 May – Lady Margaret Beaufort, mother of Henry VII of England (died 1509)
  - John de Vere, 13th Earl of Oxford, Lancastrian leader (died 1513)
  - Anne Beauchamp, 15th Countess of Warwick (died 1449)
- 1444
  - John de Mowbray, 4th Duke of Norfolk (died 1476)
- 1446
  - Edmund de Ros, 10th Baron de Ros, politician (died 1508)
  - William Grocyn, scholar (died 1519)
- 1449
  - 21 October – George Plantagenet, 1st Duke of Clarence, brother of Edward IV and Richard III (died 1478)

== Deaths ==
- 1440
  - 30 September – Reginald Grey, 3rd Baron Grey de Ruthyn, soldier and politician (born c. 1362)
  - 13 November – Joan Beaufort, Countess of Westmoreland (born c. 1379)
- 1441
  - 27 October – Margery Jourdemayne, "the witch of Eye", burned at the stake
- 1443
  - 12 April – Henry Chichele, Archbishop of Canterbury, having served since 1414, the longest ever in this office (born c. 1364)
- 1444
  - 27 May – John Beaufort, 1st Duke of Somerset, military leader (born 1404)
- 1445
  - 5 June – Leonel Power, composer (year of birth unknown, between 1370–1385)
  - 11 June – Henry de Beauchamp, 1st Duke of Warwick (born 1424)
- 1447
  - 23 February – Humphrey, Duke of Gloucester (born 1390)
  - 11 April – Henry Beaufort, Cardinal, Lord Chancellor (born 1377)
  - John Holland, 2nd Duke of Exeter (born 1395)
- 1449
  - Anne Beauchamp, 15th Countess of Warwick (born 1443)
