= 1460s in England =

Events from the 1460s in England.

== Incumbents ==
- Monarch – Henry VI (until 4 March 1461), then Edward IV

== Events ==
- 1460
  - 15 January – Wars of the Roses: Yorkists raid Sandwich, Kent and capture the royal fleet during the Battle of Sandwich.
  - 26 June – Wars of the Roses: Richard Neville, Earl of Warwick and Edward, Earl of March (eldest son of Richard Plantagenet, Duke of York) land at Sandwich with an army and march on London. Here the Earl of Salisbury remains and, with the support of the citizens, besieges the Tower of London whose Lancastrian commander, Lord Scales, on 4 July turns its weapons against the city.
  - 10 July – Wars of the Roses: At the Battle of Northampton, Richard Neville, Earl of Warwick and Edward, Earl of March defeat a Lancastrian army and seize King Henry VI. Queen Margaret escapes with her son, Edward, across Cheshire to Harlech Castle.
  - 19 July – Lord Scales surrenders the Tower of London to the Yorkists; he is subsequently murdered by a mob.
  - 10 October – Richard of York claims the throne in London.
  - 25 October – Parliament passes the Act of Accord, proclaiming Richard of York as the heir to the throne, disinheriting the King's son Edward of Westminster, Prince of Wales.
  - 30 December – Wars of the Roses: At the Battle of Wakefield (at Sandal Magna), a decisive Lancastrian victory under Henry Beaufort, Duke of Somerset and Henry Percy, Earl of Northumberland, is won and Richard of York and his son, Edmund, Earl of Rutland, are both killed, the latter murdered after the battle, while Warwick's father, the Earl of Salisbury, is beheaded the following day. York's son Edward, Earl of March becomes leader of the Yorkist faction.
- 1461
  - 2 February – Wars of the Roses: At the Battle of Mortimer's Cross in Herefordshire, Yorkist troops led by Edward, Earl of March defeat Lancastrians under Owen Tudor and his son Jasper.
  - 17 February – Wars of the Roses: At the Second Battle of St Albans, Richard Neville, Earl of Warwick's army is defeated by a Lancastrian force under Queen Margaret, who recovers control of her husband. The following day, the King's protectors, William Bonville, 1st Baron Bonville and Sir Thomas Kyriell, are executed for treason.
  - 4 March – Edward, Earl of March proclaimed as King Edward IV of England in London.
  - 28 March – Wars of the Roses: The indecisive Battle of Ferrybridge is fought in Yorkshire.
  - 29 March (Palm Sunday) – Wars of the Roses: At the Battle of Towton, fought in Yorkshire in a snowstorm, the bloodiest battle ever fought on British soil, the Yorkist Edward IV defeats the Lancastrian forces of Queen Margaret to make good his claim to the English throne. Margaret escapes, initially to Linlithgow Palace near Edinburgh.
  - 25 April – Henry VI cedes Berwick upon Tweed to Scotland.
  - 28 June – Coronation of King Edward IV.
  - Cirencester Grammar School is founded by Lawrence Booth, Prince-bishop of Durham.
  - "Warkworth's" Chronicle begins.
- 1462
  - April – Queen Margaret, with her son Edward, makes her way from Edinburgh via Bamburgh and Sluis to the court of France, where on 23 June she secretly offers the surrender of Calais in return for aid and on 28 June secures aqgreement for a French-supported expedition to England.
  - 25 October – Queen Margaret leads an invasion of Northumberland with French forces under Pierre de Brézé. Picking up Henry VI in Scotland, they land at Bamburgh and briefly take Alnwick for the Lancastrians before being forced by an advancing Yorkist army and the wrecking of their fleet to take refuge at Berwick Castle, which is itself recaptured by Yorkists by Christmas.
- 1463
  - August – Queen Margaret leaves Scotland for France. She will never see her husband again and will not return to England until 1471.
  - 8 October – Truce of Hesdin ends French support for the Lancastrians.
  - Importation of foreign playing cards banned to protect English manufacturers.
- 1464
  - 25 April – Wars of the Roses: At the Battle of Hedgeley Moor, Yorkist forces under John Neville defeat Lancastrians under Sir Ralph Percy, who is killed.
  - 1 May – Edward IV secretly marries the widowed commoner Elizabeth Woodville. He keeps the marriage a secret until 14 September.
  - 15 May – Wars of the Roses: At the Battle of Hexham, Neville defeats the Lancastrian army. This marks the end of organized Lancastrian resistance for several years.
  - 1 June – Treaty of York, a 15-year truce with Scotland is signed.
  - 13 July – Former King Henry VI is captured by Yorkist forces near Waddington, Lancashire and imprisoned in the Tower of London.
- 1465
  - c. March – Re-foundation of Queens' College, Cambridge by Elizabeth Woodville.
  - 26 May – Coronation of Elizabeth Woodville as Queen Consort, the first English-born consort since 1200.
  - Reform of the coinage, including introduction of the Angel and the Rose Noble.
- 1466
  - Foundation of St Bartholomew's School, Newbury, Berkshire.
- 1467
  - June – Archbishop George Neville dismissed as Chancellor of England.
- 1468
  - 3 July – Marriage of Charles the Bold, Duke of Burgundy to Margaret of York, sister of Edward IV.
  - 29 July – Hansa merchants expelled from London; Anglo-Hanseatic War breaks out with the Hanseatic League in 1469.
  - November – First recorded English use of the rack in torture.
- 1469
  - April–May – Rebellion in the north led by 'Robin of Redesdale'.
  - June – Rebellion in the north led by 'Robin of Holderness'.
  - 12 July – Earl of Warwick joins the rebels.
  - 24 July – Wars of the Roses: Battle of Edgcote – Warwick's rebels led by 'Robin of Redesdale' are victorious over forces loyal to King Edward led by the Earl of Pembroke, who is executed 3 days later.
  - 29 July – King Edward arrested and imprisoned after his army abandons him.
  - August–October – Caister Castle is besieged by John de Mowbray, 4th Duke of Norfolk.
  - 10 September – Edward released by Warwick following widespread rioting.

== Births ==
- 1460
  - Edward Sutton, 2nd Baron Dudley (died 1532)
  - Charles Somerset, 1st Earl of Worcester (died 1526)
- 1461
  - Nicholas West, bishop and diplomat (died 1533)
- 1462
  - Approximate date – Edmund Dudley, minister of Henry VII (executed 1510)
- 1465
  - William Cornysh, composer (died 1523)
  - George Nevill, Duke of Bedford (died 1483)
- 1466
  - 11 February – Elizabeth of York, queen of Henry VII (died 1503)
- 1467
  - January – John Colet, churchman and educational pioneer (died 1519)
  - 11 August – Mary of York, daughter of King Edward IV (died 1482)
  - John Bourchier, 2nd Baron Berners, translator (died 1553)
  - John Yonge, ecclesiastic and diplomatist (died 1516)
  - William Latimer, churchman and scholar (died 1545)
- 1468
  - Approximate date – John of Gloucester, Captain of Calais, illegitimate son of Richard III (executed? c. 1499)
- 1469
  - 20 March – Cecily of York, princess (died 1507)

== Deaths ==
- 1460
  - 10 July (at the Battle of Northampton)
    - Humphrey Stafford, 1st Duke of Buckingham, military leader (born 1402)
    - John Talbot, 2nd Earl of Shrewsbury (born c. 1413)
  - 30 December – Richard Plantagenet, 3rd Duke of York, claimant to the English throne (killed in battle) (born 1411)
  - 31 December
    - Richard Neville, 5th Earl of Salisbury, politician (executed) (born 1400)
    - Edmund, Earl of Rutland, brother of Kings Edward IV of England and Richard III of England (executed) (born 1443)
  - Approximate date – Reginald Pecock, deposed Welsh bishop and writer (born c. 1392)
- 1461
  - 28 March – John Clifford, 9th Baron de Clifford (in battle) (born 1435)
  - 29 March (at the Battle of Towton)
    - Henry Percy, 3rd Earl of Northumberland (born 1421)
    - Lionel de Welles, 6th Baron Welles (born 1406)
  - 6 November – John de Mowbray, 3rd Duke of Norfolk (born 1415)
- 1462
  - 26 February – John de Vere, 12th Earl of Oxford (executed) (born 1408)
- 1464
  - 15 May – Henry Beaufort, 3rd Duke of Somerset (executed) (born 1436)
  - 17 May – Thomas de Ros, 9th Baron de Ros, politician (executed) (born 1427)
  - 12 August – John Capgrave, historian and theologian (born 1393)
- 1465
  - 14 January – Thomas Beckington, statesman and prelate (born c. 1390)
  - John Hardyng, chronicler (born 1378)
- 1468
  - 14 June – Margaret Beauchamp, Countess (born 1404)
  - 30 June – Lady Eleanor Talbot (born 1436)
- 1469
  - 12 August – Richard Woodville, 1st Earl Rivers (executed) (born 1405)
