= Bertram Fitzalan =

English Carmelite theologian

Bertram Fitzalan (died 1424) was an English Carmelite theologian.

== Life ==
Fitzalan entered the Carmelite fraternity at Lincoln, and studied at Oxford, where William Quaplod, also a Carmelite, was his friend and patron. He was at the trial in 1392 of Henry Crump, and was by then B.D.

Fitzalan, after proceeding to the degree of master, seems to have returned to Lincoln. He died on 17 May 1424.

== Works ==
He founded a library in Lincoln. In it John Bale saw the following works of his:

- 'Super quarto Sententiarum liber i.,'
- 'Quæstiones Theologiæ,' and
- 'Ad plebem Conciones.'

A volume of Excerpta in the library of Balliol College, Oxford once attributed to Fitzalan is now thought to be by Bertrand de Alen.
