= 1520s in England =

Events from the 1520s in England.

== Incumbents ==
- Monarch – Henry VIII
- Regent – Thomas Howard, 2nd Duke of Norfolk (starting 31 May, until 16 July 1520)

== Events ==
- 1520
  - 26–31 May – Charles V, Holy Roman Emperor (and Queen Catherine of Aragon's nephew) visits King Henry VIII at Dover and Canterbury.
  - 7–24 June – King Henry VIII and King Francis I of France meet at the Field of the Cloth of Gold.
- 1521
  - 17 May – Edward Stafford, 3rd Duke of Buckingham, is executed for treason.
  - 25 September – secret Treaty of Bruges signed by Emperor Charles V and Cardinal Wolsey agreeing to declare war on France in 1523.
  - 11 October – Pope Leo X bestows Henry VIII with the title Defender of the Faith for his work Assertio Septem Sacramentorum (The Assertion of the Seven Sacraments) attacking the teachings of Martin Luther.
- 1522
  - Late May – England presents an ultimatum to France and Scotland.
  - 19 June – Charles V visits England for six weeks and signs the Treaty of Windsor pledging a joint invasion of France, bringing England into the Italian War of 1521–1526. Henry VIII has the Round Table at Winchester Castle repainted with his own image for the visit.
  - July – the English army attacks Brittany and Picardy from Calais, burning and looting the countryside.
  - Muster rolls are compiled in the counties.
- 1523
  - April – Thomas More elected Speaker of the House of Commons.
  - Thomas Howard raids Scotland, sacking Kelso and Jedburgh.
  - Anthony Fitzherbert publishes Diversité de courtz et leur jurisdictions, The Boke of Surveyinge and Improvements and The Boke of Husbandrie (the first work on agriculture published in England).
- 1524
  - 25 May – Henry VIII and Charles V form an alliance to support Charles III, Duke of Bourbon in his dispute with Francis I of France.
  - Henry VIII receives a "box of marmalade" from Mr Hull of Exeter.
- 1525
  - 4 June – 1525 Bayham Abbey riot: villagers riot and occupy Bayham Old Abbey in Kent for a week in protest against Cardinal Thomas Wolsey's order to suppress the monastery on the grounds of financial mismanagement and in order to fund colleges founded by him; 31 men are arrested.
  - June – the Amicable Grant, a form of poll tax imposed without the consent of Parliament, is abandoned.
  - 16 June – Henry VIII creates his 6-year old illegitimate son Henry Fitzroy Duke of Richmond and Somerset.
  - July – Wolsey founds Cardinal College, Oxford.
  - 14 August – peace is agreed between England and France; on 30 August King Henry VIII and the French ambassador sign the Treaty of the More at Wolsey's castle of "The More" in Hertfordshire.
  - 10 October – a preliminary agreement for a 3-year peace with Scotland is signed at Berwick-upon-Tweed.
  - 24–25 December – English Reformation: Robert Barnes preaches an openly evangelical sermon at the church of St Edward King and Martyr, Cambridge, accusing the Catholic Church of heresy.
  - William Tyndale's New Testament Bible translation into English is made but printing in Cologne is interrupted by anti-Lutheran forces.
  - Hops first cultivated in Kent.
  - A church clock is installed at East Hendred in the Vale of White Horse which will still be functioning in situ 500 years later.
- 1526
  - Spring – William Tyndale's English translation of the Bible reaches England, printing having been completed in Worms, Germany (with other copies being printed in Amsterdam). In October, Cuthbert Tunstall, Bishop of London, attempts to collect all the copies in his diocese and burn them.
  - August–November – The first of several debasements of coinage, reducing the size of silver coins, and raising the value of the gold sovereign and angel.
  - c. September – German artist Hans Holbein the Younger begins a two-year stay in England.
- 1527
  - 15 January – Portuguese carrack St Anthony founders off The Lizard, Cornwall, with a valuable cargo.
  - 30 April – by the Treaty of Westminster, Cardinal Wolsey signs an alliance between England and France.
  - 17 May – Archbishop William Warham holds a secret inquiry into the legality of Henry's marriage to Catherine of Aragon.
  - Bishop Vesey's Grammar School, Sutton Coldfield, is founded by John Vesey, Bishop of Exeter; and Sir George Monoux College, Walthamstow, is founded as a grammar school by Sir George Monoux, draper and Lord Mayor of London.
  - The King sends his secretary, William Knight, to Rome to seek papal dispensations allowing the annulment of the King's current marriage and allowing him to remarry. Pope Clement VII, who is at this time a de facto prisoner of Charles V, Holy Roman Emperor and Queen Catherine's nephew, will grant only a conditional dispensation, of no use to Henry, who places "the King's great matter" (the securing of an annulment) into Wolsey's hands.
- 1528
  - 22 January – Henry VIII and Francis I of France declare war on Emperor Charles V.
  - March – trade suspended between England and the Netherlands because of the war with the Holy Roman Empire.
  - end May – the fourth major outbreak of the sweating sickness appears in London, rapidly spreading to the rest of England.
  - June – unrest in England caused by economic difficulties due to the war forces the government to seek a truce with the Empire.
  - 2 October – William Tyndale's The Obedience of a Christian Man (The Obedience of a Christen man, and how Christen rulers ought to govern) is printed in Antwerp for clandestine distribution in England.
  - St George's Chapel, Windsor Castle, completed.
  - The King's School, Ipswich, is founded by Cardinal Wolsey.
- 1529
  - May–July – Wolsey presides over a legatine court at Blackfriars, London, to rule on the legality of Henry's marriage to Catherine of Aragon, but the papal legate has no power to grant an annulment.
  - 27 August – Henry VIII accedes to the Treaty of Cambrai.
  - 26 October – Cardinal Wolsey falls from power due to his failure to prevent Habsburg expansion in Europe and obtain a divorce for Henry VIII. Thomas More succeeds him as Lord Chancellor.
  - 4 November–17 December – first sitting of the Reformation Parliament.
  - Aylesbury is made the county town of Buckinghamshire by the King.

== Births ==
- 1520
  - 13 September – William Cecil, 1st Baron Burghley, statesman (died 1598)
- 1521
  - Anne Askew, Protestant martyr (burned at the stake 1546)
  - John Aylmer, bishop (died 1594)
  - Thomas Chaloner, statesman and poet (died 1565)
  - Philippe de Monte, composer (died 1603)
  - Thomas Wyatt the younger, rebel (beheaded 1554)
- 1522
  - 24 May – John Jewel, bishop (died 1571)
- 1524
  - Thomas Tusser, poet and farmer (died 1580)
- 1525
  - 25 March – Richard Edwardes, choral musician, playwright and poet (died 1566)
  - 25 September – Steven Borough, explorer (died 1584)
- 1526
  - 4 March – Henry Carey, 1st Baron Hunsdon (died 1596)
  - 23 September – Henry Manners, 2nd Earl of Rutland, Lord Lieutenant of Nottinghamshire (died 1563)
- 1527
  - 28 March – Isabella Markham, courtier (died 1579)
  - 13 July – John Dee, mathematician, astronomer, and geographer (died 1608)
  - Approximate date – John Dudley, 2nd Earl of Warwick (died 1554)
  - 1525/7? – Lawrence Humphrey, clergyman and educator (died 1590)
- 1528
  - c. 1522/28 – George Talbot, 6th Earl of Shrewsbury, statesman (died 1590)
- 1529
  - 20 July – Henry Sidney, lord deputy of Ireland (died 1586)

== Deaths ==
- 1521
  - 17 May – Edward Stafford, 3rd Duke of Buckingham (executed) (born 1478)
  - 22 October – Edward Poyning, Lord Deputy to King Henry VII of England (born 1459)
- 1522
  - 25 February – William Lilye, classical scholar (born c. 1468)
  - 6 April – Henry Stafford, 1st Earl of Wiltshire, nobleman (born 1479)
- 1523
  - 24 May – Henry Marney, 1st Baron Marney, politician (born 1447)
  - October – William Cornysh, composer (born 1465)
  - Stephen Hawes, poet (born 1502)
- 1524
  - 21 May – Thomas Howard, 2nd Duke of Norfolk, soldier and statesman (born 1443)
  - 24 August – William Scott of Scott's Hall, Lord Warden of the Cinque Ports (year of birth unknown)
  - 20 December – Thomas Linacre, humanist and physician (born 1460)
- 1525
  - 24 February – Richard de la Pole, last Yorkist claimant to the throne (killed in battle) (year of birth unknown)
  - 22 July – Richard Wingfield, diplomat (born c. 1456)
- 1526
  - 1 February – Charles Somerset, 1st Earl of Worcester (born 1460)
- 1527
  - May – Thomas Docwra, Grand Prior of the Knights Hospitaller (born 1458)
  - 15 November – Catherine of York, aunt of Henry VIII (born 1479)
  - Jane Shore, mistress of King Edward IV of England (born c. 1445)
- 1528
  - 5 October – Richard Foxe, churchman (born c. 1448)
- 1529
  - 21 June – John Skelton, English poet (born c. 1460)
  - c. December – Richard Pynson, printer (born c. 1449 in Normandy)
