= John Clopton (died 1424) =

English politician

John Clopton (died 1424), of Gloucester, was an English Member of Parliament (MP).

He was a Member of the Parliament of England for Gloucester in May 1413.
