= 1490s in England =

Events from the 1490s in England.

== Incumbents ==
- Monarch – Henry VII
- Regent – Arthur, Prince of Wales (starting 2 October, until 17 November 1492)

== Events ==
- 1490
  - Construction begins on the tower of Magdalen College, Oxford. John Colet receives his M.A. from the college.
  - Perkin Warbeck claims to be Richard of Shrewsbury, Duke of York, the son of King Edward IV, at the court of Burgundy.
- 1491
  - November – Perkin Warbeck begins a campaign to take the English throne with a landing in Ireland.
  - 21 December – Truce of Coldstream secures a 5-year peace with Scotland.
  - Henry VII imposes a benevolence (tax).
- 1492
  - October – English army lays siege to Boulogne.
  - 3 November – Peace of Etaples signed between England and France, ending French support for the pretender Perkin Warbeck. All English-held territory in France with the exception of Calais is returned to France. France withdraws its support for Perkin Warbeck.
  - Richard Pynson prints his first known dated book in London, an edition of Alexander Grammaticus's Doctrinale.
  - Founding date of Ermysted's Grammar School, Skipton, North Yorkshire.
- 1493
  - Sanctions imposed on Burgundy for supporting Warbeck.
- 1494
  - May – Maximilian I, Holy Roman Emperor, recognises Warbeck as rightful King of England.
  - John Lydgate's translation The Fall of Princes is published posthumously.
- 1495
  - 16 February – William Stanley, the Lord Chamberlain, executed for supporting Warbeck.
  - 3 July – Battle of Deal: Perkin Warbeck's troops land at Deal, Kent, in support of his claim to the English crown, backed by Margaret of York, the Duchess of Burgundy. They are routed before Warbeck himself can disembark, and he retreats to Ireland and then to Scotland.
  - October – Parliament passes:
    - A Treason Act, providing that a person serving a king de facto for the time being is not guilty of treason if he wages war against the king de jure, still in force as of 2025.
    - A Vagabond Act, requiring vagabonds to be punished.
  - Henry VII commissions the world's first dry dock at Portsmouth.
- 1496
  - 24 February – Henry VII signs the commercial treaty Intercursus Magnus with Venice, Florence and the villes of the Hanse and Pays-Bas.
  - 5 March – King Henry VII issues letters patent to Italian-born adventurer John Cabot and his sons, authorising them to discover unknown lands.
  - 12 June – Jesus College, Cambridge, founded.
  - 21–25 September – James IV of Scotland invades Northumberland in support of the pretender Perkin Warbeck.
  - A public convenience is built on the "Old Welsh Bridge" in Shrewsbury.
- 1497
  - 16 January – Henry VII opens his sixth English Parliament for a two-month session. The House of Commons elects Sir Thomas Englefield as its speaker.
  - 13 March – Henry VII gives royal assent to numerous acts passed as parliament adjourns, including the following:
    - Weights and Measures Act, standardising units of weight and of volume throughout England. Specifically, the smallest unit, the "sterling" is set at the weight of 32 corns of wheat, 20 sterlings are an ounce, 12 ounces are a pound. A gallon of wheat must weight 8 pounds Troy weight, and a 12-gallon bushel must weight 64 pounds.
    - Benefit of Clergy Act, requiring that charges against a church official for treason must be tried in a government court of law. For other charges, clergymen may still have the benefit of being tried by an ecclesiastical court under canon law.
  - May
    - Cornish Rebellion incited by war taxes.
    - John Cabot sets sail from Bristol on the ship Matthew (principally owned by Richard Amerike) looking for new lands to the west.
  - 17 June – Cornish rebels under Michael An Gof are soundly defeated by Henry VII at the Battle of Deptford Bridge near London.
  - 7 September – Second Cornish Uprising: Perkin Warbeck lands at Whitesand Bay near Land's End.
  - 10 September – Warbeck proclaimed as King in Bodmin.
  - 30 September – Treaty of Ayton establishes 7-year peace with Scotland.
  - 4 October – leaders of the Second Cornish Uprising surrender to the King at Taunton.
  - 5 October – Warbeck, having deserted his army, is captured at Beaulieu Abbey in Hampshire.
  - 23 December – Sheen Palace is destroyed by fire. Henry VII rebuilds it as Richmond Palace.
  - John Alcock's Mons Perfectionis is published, the first printed sermon by an English bishop.
  - Possible date – first performance of the earliest known full-length secular play wholly in English, Fulgens and Lucrece by Henry Medwall, the first English vernacular playwright known by name, perhaps at Lambeth Palace in London.
- 1498
  - May
    - Merchant Adventurers granted a trade monopoly with the Netherlands.
    - Cabot leaves Bristol on his second voyage to the Americas; he is never to be seen again.
  - Summer – the final Welsh revolt of the medieval era breaks out in Meirionnydd, North Wales; Harlech Castle is captured by the rebels before the revolt is suppressed.
- 1499
  - 19 May – 13-year-old Catherine of Aragon, the future first wife of Henry VIII, is married by proxy to his brother, 12-year-old Arthur, Prince of Wales.
  - 23 November – Perkin Warbeck, pretender to the English crown, is hanged at Tyburn following an alleged attempt to escape from the Tower of London.
  - 28 November – Edward Plantagenet, 17th Earl of Warwick, last legitimate male heir to the House of York, is beheaded for allegedly conspiring in Warbeck's escape.
  - Giggleswick School is founded by Reverend James Carr.

== Births ==
- 1490
  - Approximate date – John Taverner, composer and organist (died 1545)
- 1491
  - 28 June – King Henry VIII (died 1547)
- 1492
  - 6 April – Maud Green, Lady Parr, courtier (died 1531)
  - 2 July – Elizabeth Tudor, daughter of King Henry VII (died 1495)
  - Thomas Manners, 1st Earl of Rutland (died 1543)
  - Edward Wotton, physician and zoologist (died 1555)
- 1493
  - 17 November – John Neville, 3rd Baron Latimer, politician (died 1543)
- 1494
  - John Sutton, 3rd Baron Dudley, soldier (died 1554)
  - William Tyndale, religious reformer and Bible translator (executed 1536 in Brabant)
- 1495
  - 21 November – John Bale, churchman and literary scholar (died 1563)
  - Robert Barnes, reformer and martyr (executed 1540)
  - Thomas Wharton, 1st Baron Wharton (died 1568)
- 1496
  - 28 March – Mary Tudor, daughter of Henry VII of England and briefly queen of Louis XII of France (died 1533)
  - Edward Foxe, bishop (died 1538)
  - William Roper, lawyer and politician, son-in-law and biographer of Thomas More (died 1578)
  - Anthony St Leger, Lord Deputy of Ireland (died 1559)
  - Approximate date
    - Thomas Elyot, diplomat and scholar (died 1546)
    - Richard Rich, 1st Baron Rich, Lord Chancellor (died 1567)
    - Henry Somerset, 2nd Earl of Worcester (died 1549)
- 1497
  - Anne Stanhope, noblewoman (died 1587)
  - John Heywood, playwright (died 1580)
- 1498
  - 21 February – Ralph Neville, 4th Earl of Westmorland (died 1549)
- 1499
  - 14 August – John de Vere, 14th Earl of Oxford (died 1526)

== Deaths ==
- 1490
  - 22 May – Edmund Grey, 1st Earl of Kent (born 1416)
- 1491
  - 6 March – Richard Woodville, 3rd Earl Rivers (year of birth unknown)
  - c. 21 May – John de la Pole, 2nd Duke of Suffolk (born 1442)
  - 16 July – William Herbert, 2nd Earl of Pembroke (born 1451)
- 1492
  - c. 21 May – John de la Pole, 2nd Duke of Suffolk (born 1442)
  - 7 June – Elizabeth Woodville, Queen of Edward IV of England (born 1437)
  - 20 September – Anne Beauchamp, 16th Countess of Warwick (born 1426)
  - 23 September – Peter Courtenay, bishop and politician (born c. 1432)
- 1493
  - James Blount, soldier (year of birth unknown)
- 1494
  - 15 November – William Calthorpe, knight (born 1410)
- 1495
  - 31 May – Cecily Neville, mother of Kings Edward IV and Richard III of England (born 1415)
  - 14 September – Elizabeth Tudor, daughter of Henry VII of England (born 1492)
  - 21 December – Jasper Tudor, 1st Duke of Bedford (born c. 1431)
- 1497
  - 27 June – executed
    - Thomas Flamank, Cornish lawyer (year of birth unknown)
    - Michael An Gof, Cornish rebel (year of birth unknown)
  - 28 June – James Tuchet, 7th Baron Audley (executed) (born c. 1463)
- 1498
  - 24 March – Edward Stafford, 2nd Earl of Wiltshire (born 1470)
  - 17 August – John Scrope, 5th Baron Scrope of Bolton (born 1437)
- 1499
  - 24 March – Edward Stafford, 2nd Earl of Wiltshire (born 1470)
  - 23 November – Perkin Warbeck, Flemish imposter, claimant to the English throne (executed) (born c. 1474)
  - 28 November – Edward Plantagenet, 17th Earl of Warwick, last male member of the House of York (executed) (born 1475)
  - Approximate date – John of Gloucester, Captain of Calais, illegitimate son of Richard III (executed?) (born c. 1468)
