= Battle of Sandwich (1460) =

Naval battle of the Wars of the Roses

Coordinates: 51.275°N 1.427°E

- Part of the Wars of the Roses
Date	15 January 1460
Location	At sea, near Sandwich, Kent
Result	Yorkist victory

Belligerents
House of Lancaster	House of York

Commanders and leaders
Baron Rivers (surrendered)	Sir John Dynham

Strength
Unknown	800

Casualties and losses
Unknown	Unknown

The Battle of Sandwich was a naval skirmish off the town of Sandwich on the 15 January 1460 during the Wars of the Roses. In it, Sir John Dynham, Sir John Wenlock, and the Earl of Warwick, Captain of Calais, on the Yorkist side, defeated a Lancastrian fleet and captured several of its ships. Little evidence and few details of the battle survive.

== Background ==
The port town of Sandwich, (it is now inland but historically faced the sea until the silting up of Wantsum Channel) was one of the Cinque Ports in the 15th century. It had historically served as one of the major landing and embarkation points from and to France.

== Battle ==
Edward, Earl of March and Richard, Earl of Salisbury, had fled to the English stronghold of Calais after their defeat at the Battle of Ludford Bridge.

Sent ahead by Warwick, Sir John Dynham found the king's fleet lying at Sandwich. Arriving at dawn, Dynham launched an attack while the king's officers were still in bed. His success was so overwhelming that he "tooke the principall shippes of the Kynge's navie... well furnished with ordinaunce and artillarie".

== Aftermath ==
With command of the English Channel secured by this battle, a small Yorkist army of about two thousand men landed in Kent from Calais ahead of March and Warwick. Once the town of Sandwich itself had been secured by his forces in June 1460, Warwick landed there with March and Salisbury on 26 June 1460. Having cleared the Channel of French pirates (who had been able to raid the town thanks to the chaos caused in England by the civil war) and having made the coast of Kent safe, Warwick was received in Kent as a hero. The French meanwhile aided the Lancastrians a year later.

Warwick's army soon increased in numbers, joined by many new recruits, and was largely well supported as it proceeded by way of Canterbury and probably Wickhambreaux. The Yorkist commanders had remained popular in Kent, and the officers in charge of protecting the county against them even joined forces with the rebels. The growing army then marched on London, where it arrived on 2 July to be welcomed by William Hulin, Lord Mayor of London, and Thomas Bourchier, Archbishop of Canterbury. The Yorkist army then marched towards Northampton to meet Henry VI and his Lancastrian army, and the two forces met at the Battle of Northampton on 10 July.
