= William Waynflete =

15th-century English bishop and educator

- Bishop of Winchester
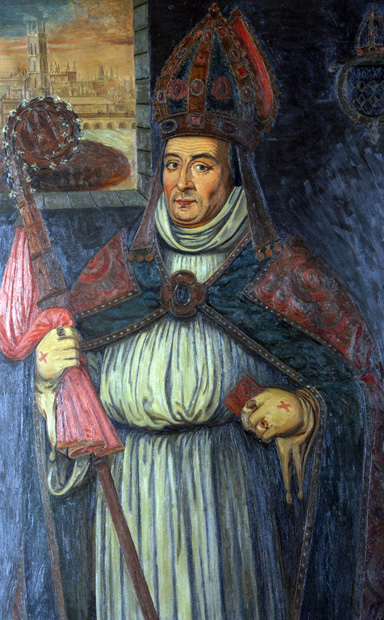
- Church: Roman Catholic
- Appointed: 10 May 1447
- Term ended: 11 August 1486
- Predecessor: Henry Beaufort
- Successor: Peter Courtenay

Orders
- Ordination: 21 January 1426
- Consecration: 30 July 1447 by John Stafford

Personal details
- Born: William Patten c. 1398 Wainfleet, Lincolnshire, England
- Died: 11 August 1486 Bishop's Waltham, Hampshire, England

Arms of William Waynflete: Lozengy ermine and sable, on a chief of the second three lilies argent

William Waynflete (c. 1398 (Note: Some sources give 1395.) – 11 August 1486), born William Patten, was Headmaster of Winchester College (1429–1441), Provost of Eton College (1442–1447), Bishop of Winchester (1447–1486) and Lord Chancellor of England (1456–1460). He founded Magdalen College, Oxford, and three subsidiary schools, namely Magdalen College School in Oxford, Magdalen College School, Brackley in Northamptonshire and Wainfleet All Saints in Lincolnshire.

== Early life ==
Waynflete was born in Wainfleet in Lincolnshire (whence his surname) in about 1398. He was the eldest son of Richard Patten (alias Barbour), a merchant. (Note: His effigy, formerly in the parish church of Wainfleet, but now in Magdalen College Chapel at Oxford, seems to be in the dress of a merchant.) His mother was Margery, daughter of Sir William Brereton of Brereton, Cheshire. He had a younger brother named John, who later became the dean of Chichester.

It has been suggested that Waynflete attended Winchester College and New College, Oxford, but this is improbable. Neither college claimed in his lifetime that he was one of its former students. However, that Waynflete was at the University of Oxford, and probably a scholar at one of the grammar schools there, before passing on to the higher faculties, is shown by a letter of the Chancellor addressed to him when Provost of Eton College, which speaks of the university as his mother who brought him forth into the light of knowledge and nourished him with the alimony of all the sciences.

Waynflete is probably the William Barbour who was ordained as an acolyte by Bishop Fleming of Lincoln on 21 April 1420 and subdeacon on 21 January 1421; and as William Barbour, otherwise Waynflete of Spalding, was ordained deacon on 18 March 1421, and priest on 21 January 1426, with entitlement from Spalding Priory.

Waynflete may have been the William Waynflete who was admitted a "scholar" of the King's Hall, Cambridge, on 6 March 1428, and was described as LL.B. when receiving letters of protection on 13 July 1429 to enable him to accompany Robert FitzHugh, Warden of the hall, on an embassy to Rome. The "scholars" of the King's Hall were what are now called Fellows, as may be seen by the appointment to the hall on 3 April 1360 of Nicholas of Drayton, B.C.L., and John Kent, B.A., in place of two scholars who had gone off to the French wars without the Warden's leave. The William Waynflete who was presented to the vicarage of Skendleby, Lincolnshire, by the Priory of Bardney on 14 June 1430, may also have been our Waynflete. There was, however, another William Waynflete, who was instituted rector of Wraxall, Somerset, on 17 May 1433 and was dead when his successor was appointed on 18 November 1436. A successor to the William Waynflete at the King's Hall was admitted on 3 April 1434.

== Early career ==
In 1429, Waynflete became headmaster of Winchester College, a position which he held until 1441. During this time, Waynflete was appointed by Bishop Beaufort to the mastership of St Mary Magdalen's Hospital, a leper hospital on St Giles Hill, just outside the city of Winchester. The first recorded headmaster after the foundation of the college, John Melton, had been presented by William of Wykeham to the mastership of this hospital in 1393 shortly before his retirement.

On 3 July 1441 Henry VI went for a weekend visit to Winchester College to see the school for himself. Here he seems to have been so much impressed with Waynflete that by the autumn Waynflete had ceased to be headmaster of Winchester. In October he was dining in the hall there as a guest, and at Christmas 1442 he received a royal livery, five yards of violet cloth, as provost of Eton.

Under the influence of Archbishop Chichele (who had himself founded two colleges in imitation of Wykeham); Thomas Bekynton, the king's secretary and privy seal; and other Wykehamists, Henry VI, on 11 October 1440, founded, in imitation of Winchester College, a college in the parish church of Eton by Windsor (not far from his own birthplace) called the King's College of the Blessed Mary of Eton by Windsor, as a sort of first-fruits of his taking the government on himself. The college was to consist of a provost, 10 priests, 6 choristers, 70 poor and needy scholars, 25 almsmen and a magister informator (later "headmaster") to teach (Latin) grammar to the foundation scholars and to all others coming from any part of England, at no cost. On 5 March 1440/41, the king endowed the college with some £500 a year taken from the alien priories: almost exactly the amount of the original endowment of Winchester.

Though reckoned first headmaster of Eton, there is no definite evidence that Waynflete acted as such. The school building was not begun until May 1442. William Westbury left New College, Oxford, in May 1442, transferring himself to the king's service. He appears in the first extant "Eton Audit Roll 1444–1445" as magister informator, and was probably such from May 1442. If Waynflete was headmaster from October 1441 to May 1442, his duties must have been little more than nominal. As Provost, Waynflete procured the exemption of the college from archidiaconal authority on 2 May, and made the contract for completion of the carpenter's work on the eastern side of the quadrangle on 30 November 1443.

On 21 December 1443 Waynflete was sworn to observe the statutes by Bishop Bekynton and the Earl of Suffolk, the king's commissioners, and he himself administered the oath to the other members of the foundation: then only five fellows and eleven scholars over 15 years of age. (Younger scholars were not required to take an oath.) It is said that he took half the Fellows and scholars of Winchester College to Eton to start the school there. However, only five scholars and perhaps one commoner (pupil not on the foundation) left Winchester for Eton in 1443, probably in July, just before the election. Three of them were admitted scholars of King's College, Cambridge, on 19 July. That college, by its second charter of 10 July 1443, had been placed in the same relation to Eton that New College bore to Winchester: i.e. it was to be recruited entirely from Eton.

The chief part of Waynflete's duties as Provost was the financing and completion of the buildings and establishment. The number of scholars was considerably increased by an election of 25 new foundation scholars on 26 September 1444. The college's annual income was then £946, of which the king contributed £120 and Waynflete £18, or more than half his stipend of £30 a year. The full number of 70 scholars was not filled up until Waynflete's last year as Provost, 1446–1447 (Eton Audit Roll).

== Bishop of Winchester ==
Waynflete depicted in a stained-glass window of St Lawrence Church, Winchester

So greatly did Waynflete ingratiate himself with Henry that when Beaufort, bishop of Winchester, Henry's uncle, died on 11 April 1447, the king wrote to the chapter of Winchester, instructing them to elect Waynflete as bishop. On 12 April he was given the custody of the temporalities, between 15 and 17 April he was elected, and on 10 May provided to the see by a papal bull. On 13 July 1447 he was consecrated in Eton church, when the Warden and Fellows and others of his old college gave him a horse at a cost of 10 marks (£6 13s 4d), and one mark (13s 4d) to the boys. Subsequent visits to Winchester inspired Henry with the idea of rebuilding Eton church on cathedral dimensions. Waynflete was assigned as the principal executor of his will for that purpose, and if there was any variance between the executors, he was to determine it. From 1448 to 1450 £3336 was spent on the church, of which Waynflete with the Marquis of Suffolk and the Bishop of Salisbury contributed £100 or £1,000 according to interpretation. The troubles which began in 1450 put a stop to the work.

Waynflete, as bishop, lost no time in following the example of Wykeham and his royal patron in becoming a college founder. On 6 May 1448 he obtained licence in mortmain and on 20 August founded at Oxford for the extirpation of heresies and errors, the increase of the clerical order and the adornment of holy mother church, a perpetual hall, called Seint Marie Maudeleyn Halle, for study in sacred theology and philosophy, to consist of a president and 50 scholars. Its site was not that of the present college, but that of two earlier halls called Bostar Hall and Hare Hall, where the Examination Schools now are. Thirteen M.A.s and seven bachelors, besides the president, John Hornley, B.D., were named in the charter. The dedication to St Mary Magdalen was no doubt derived from the hospital at Winchester of which the founder had been Master. On St Wolstan's Day, 19 January 1448/49, Waynflete was enthroned in Winchester Cathedral in the presence of the king; and, probably partly for his sake, parliament was held there in June and July 1449, when the king frequently attended the college chapel, Waynflete officiating.

When Jack Cade's rebellion broke out in 1450 Waynflete was employed with Archbishop Stafford, the Chancellor, to negotiate with the rebels at St Margaret's Church, Southwark, close to Winchester House. A full pardon was promised, but on 1 August Waynflete was one of the special commissioners to try the rebels. On 7 May 1451 Waynflete, from le peynted chambre in his manor house at Southwark, asserting that his bishopric was canonically obtained and that he laboured under no disqualification, but feared some grievous attempt against himself and his see, appealed to the protection of the pope. It is suggested that this was due to some disturbances at Winchester where one of Cade's quarters was sent after his execution. But it is more likely, that it was some Yorkist attack on him in progress in the papal court. To meet this, he next day appointed 19 proctors to act for him.

In the end result nothing disturbed Waynflete's peaceable possession of the see: so that with the archbishop of Canterbury he was able to receive Henry VI when he came to Canterbury on pilgrimage on 2 August 1451. When in November the Duke of York encamped near Dartford, Waynflete with three others was sent from the King's camp at Blackheath to propose terms, which were accepted. Edward, Prince of Wales, was born on 13 October 1453 and was baptised by Waynflete the next day. That year Waynflete acquired the reversion of the manor of Stanswick, Berks, from Lady Danvers for Magdalen Hall. The king became insane in 1454. The Chancellor, John Kemp, Archbishop of Canterbury, died during the sitting of parliament, presided over by the Duke of York. Commissioners, headed by Waynflete, were therefore sent to Henry to ask the king to name a new Chancellor, apparently intending that Waynflete should be named. But no answer could be extracted from the king, and after some delay Lord Salisbury took the seals.

During York's regency, both before and after the First Battle of St Albans, Waynflete took an active part in the proceedings of the Privy Council. With a view to an ampler site for his college, Waynflete. Retrieved 5 July 1456 a grant of the Hospital of St John the Baptist outside the east gate at Oxford and on 15 July licence to found a college there. Having obtained a papal bull, he founded it by deed of 12 June 1458, converting the hospital into a college with a president and six fellows, to which college two days later Magdalen Hall surrendered itself and its possessions, its members being incorporated into the New College of St Mary Magdalen.

== Lord Chancellor ==
Meanwhile, Waynflete himself had been advanced to the highest office in the state, the Chancellorship, the seals being delivered to him on 11 October 1456 by the King in the priory of Coventry in the presence of the Duke of York, apparently as a person acceptable to both parties. On 27 October 1457 he took part in the trial and condemnation for heresy of Reginald Pecock, Bishop of Chichester, who had been ordained subdeacon and deacon on the same day and by the same bishop as Waynflete himself. Only Pecock's books and not the heretic were burnt. As the heresy consisted chiefly in defending the clergy on grounds of reason instead of authority, the proceeding does not show any great enlightenment on Waynflete's part. It must have been at this time that an addition was made by Waynflete to the Eton College statutes, compelling the Fellows to forswear the heresies of John Wycliffe and Pecock.

Waynflete presided as Chancellor at the parliament at Coventry in November 1459 (the Parliament of Devils), which attainted the Yorkist leaders after their defeat at Ludlow. Because of this, three days before the Yorkist attack at Northampton, he delivered the great seal to King Henry VI in his tent near Diapre Abbey, a nunnery near Northampton, on 7 July 1460.

== Later life ==
=== Political difficulties ===
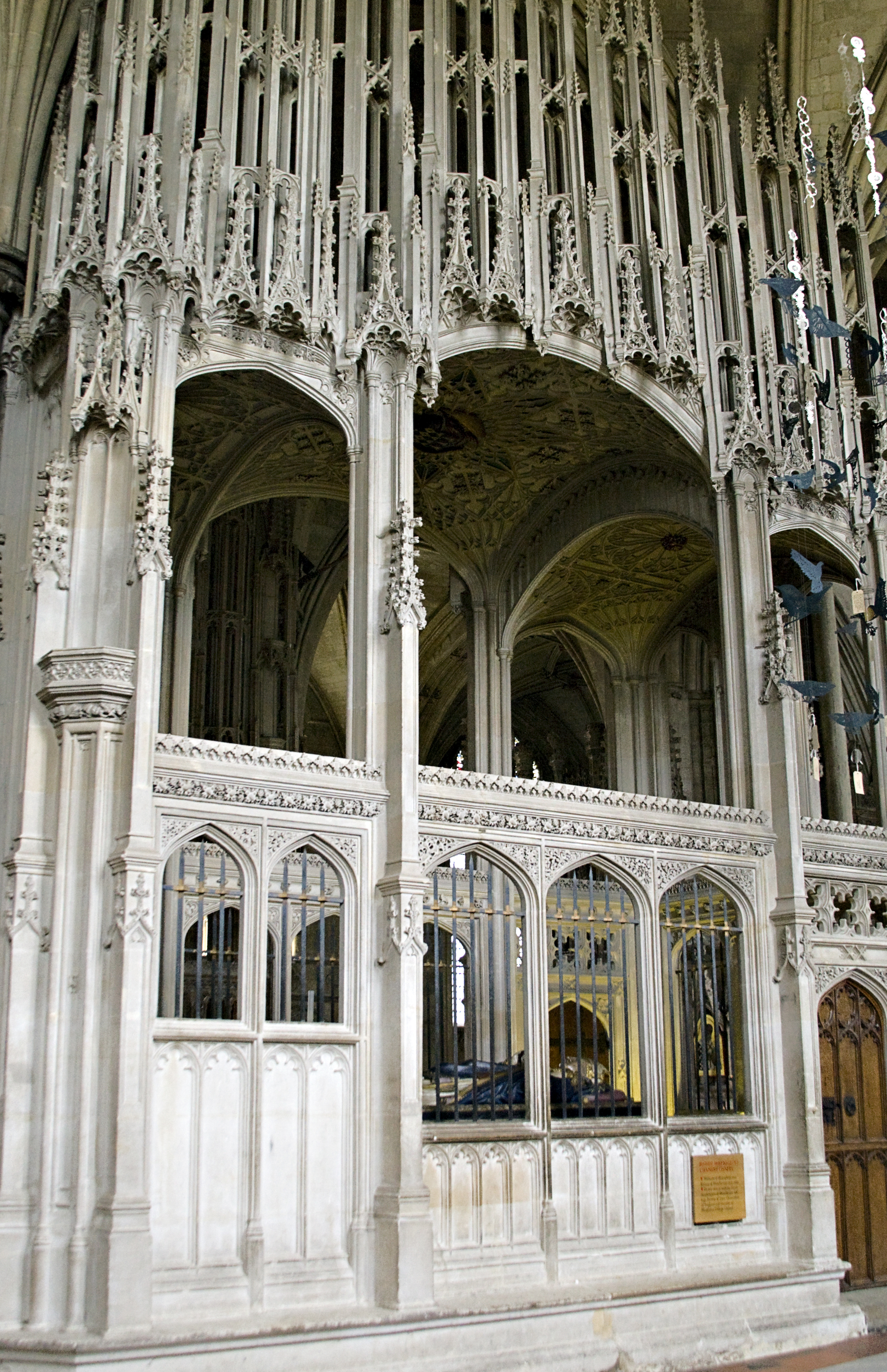
Waynflete's chantry tomb in Winchester Cathedral

Whether, as alleged by some, Waynflete fled and hid himself during the period covered by the battle of Wakefield and Edward's first parliament in 1461 is very doubtful. A testimonial to his fidelity written by Henry to the Pope on 8 November 1460 was written while Henry was in Yorkist hands. Complaints of wrongful exaction of manorial rights laid before Edward IV himself in August 1461 by the tenants of the episcopal manor of East Meon, Hampshire, were decided in the bishop's favour in parliament the following December. This also suggests that he was not regarded as an enemy by the Yorkists, even though he was a personal favourite of Henry's. A general charter of confirmation to him and his successors of the property and rights of the bishopric of Winchester on 1 July 1462 points in the same direction.

=== Eton College ===
It is certain that Waynflete took an active part in the restoration of Eton College. Edward had annexed it to St George's, Windsor in 1463, depriving it of a large part of its possessions. In the earliest Audit Rolls after the restoration of the college in 1467 there are many entries of visits of Provost Westbury to the lord of Winchester, which in January 1468–69 were for beginning the work of the church and providing money for them. Why a pardon was granted to Waynflete on 1 February 1469 does not appear. On the restoration of Henry VI on 5 October 1470 Waynflete welcomed him on his release from the Tower of London. This necessitated a new pardon, granted a month after Edward's reinstatement on 30 May 1471, and a loan to the king of 2000 marks (£1333 6s 8d). In the years 1471–1472 to 1474 Waynflete was largely engaged in completing the church, now called the chapel, at Eton: his glazier supplied the windows, and he contracted on 15 August 1475 for the rood-loft to be made on one side "like to the rode bite" in Bishop Wykeham's college at Winchester, and on the other like that of the college of St Thomas of Acre in London. In 1479 he built the ante-chapel at the west end of the chapel, of Headington stone.

=== Magdalen College ===
In 1474 Waynflete, being the principal executor of Sir John Fastolf, who died in 1459 leaving a much-contested will, procured the conversion of his bequest for a collegiate church of seven priests and seven almsmen at Caistor, Norfolk, into one for seven fellows and seven poor scholars at Magdalen. In the same year the college took possession of the alien priory of Sele, in what is now Upper Beeding, Sussex, the proceedings for the suppression of which had been going on since 1469. The new, now the old, buildings at Magdalen were begun the same year, the foundation-stone being laid in the middle of the high altar on 5 May 1474. Licences from 1477 to authorized additions to the endowment. On 23 August 1480, the college being completed, the great west window being contracted to be made after the fashion of that at All Souls' College, a new president, Richard Mayew, fellow of New College, was installed on 23 August 1480, and statutes were promulgated. The statutes were for the most part a replica of those of New College, members of which were, equally with members of Magdalen, declared to be eligible for the presidency. They provided for a head and 70 scholars, but the latter were divided into 40 fellows and 30 scholars called demies, because their commons were half those of the fellows.

Magdalen College School was established at the gates of the college to be, like Eton, a grammar school free of tuition fees for all comers, under a master and usher, the first master being John Ankywyll, with a salary of £10 a year, the same as at Winchester and Eton. The renewal of interest in classical literature was shown in the prohibition of the study of sophistry by any scholar under the age of eighteen, unless he had been pronounced proficient in grammaticals. On 22 September 1481 Waynflete received Edward IV in state at the college, where he passed the night, and in July 1483 he received Richard III there in even greater state.

In 1484 Waynflete founded another Magdalen College School in his birth town of Wainfleet All Saints, Lincolnshire as a satellite feeder school for Magdalen College, Oxford. The building is now used as a library, with a museum upstairs.

On 27 April 1486, Waynflete, like Wykeham, made his will at their favourite manor, now Bishop's Waltham Palace. He gave the same pecuniary bequests to Winchester and New Colleges as to his own college of Magdalen, but the latter he made residuary devisee of all his lands. Waynflete died on 11 August 1486 at Bishop's Waltham in Hampshire. He was buried in the Magdalen Chapel at Winchester Cathedral.

== Commemoration ==
The Waynflete Building at Magdalen College, Oxford, a hall of residence, commemorates Bishop Waynflete, and the college endows four professorial fellowships in science in his honour, which are collectively known as the Waynflete Professorships.

There is also a Waynflete School in Portland, Maine, which is named after him.

There is a road named Waynflete Road in his honour in the Barton area of Headington, Oxford, one named Waynflete Place in Winchester, a Waynflete Close in Bishop's Waltham, and also Waynflete Street, in Earlsfield, London.

"Waynflete" is a boys' boarding house at Eton College.

An annual memorial service, known as the Waynflete Obit, is held in Winchester Cathedral on the anniversary of his death. The choir for the occasion is formed from members of the Waynflete Singers, who are named after the bishop.

Waynflete projects are research projects undertaken by sixth formers at Magdalen College School, Oxford. Awards are given for the best projects by the President of Magdalen College, Dinah Rose. Alumni of the school are known as "Old Waynfletes".

== See also ==
- Wayneflete Tower

== Sources ==
- Fryde, E. B.; Greenway, D. E.; Porter, S.; Roy, I. (1996). Handbook of British Chronology (Third revised ed.). Cambridge: Cambridge University Press. ISBN 0-521-56350-X.
- Herbermann, Charles, ed. (1913). "William of Wayneflete" . Catholic Encyclopedia. New York: Robert Appleton Company.

Political offices
| Preceded by Thomas Bourchier | Lord Chancellor; 1456–1460 | Succeeded by George Neville |
Catholic Church titles
| Preceded by Henry Beaufort | Bishop of Winchester; 1447–1486 | Succeeded by Peter Courtenay |
