= 1380s in England =

Events from the 1380s in England.

== Incumbents ==
- Monarch – Richard II

== Events ==
- 1380
  - 16 January – Parliament declares Richard II of age to rule.
  - 13 March – The town of Winchelsea in East Sussex is attacked and burned by an expeditionary force from France for a second time.
  - February – John de Cobham, 3rd Baron Cobham, is licensed to begin the 5-year fortification of Cooling Castle on the south side of the Thames Estuary; it is the earliest English castle designed for the use of gunpowder weapons by its defenders.
  - July to September – Hundred Years' War: The King's uncle, Thomas of Woodstock, raids France; the French burn Portsmouth.
  - November – the second of a series of three poll taxes designed to help pay for the war against France.
  - John Wycliffe begins to translate the Bible into English.
  - Sir William Walworth, a member of the Fishmongers Guild, becomes Lord Mayor of London for the second time.
- 1381
  - January – Hundred Years' War: Brittany surrenders to France, although England retains control of Brest.
  - Spring – the third and final of a series of poll taxes designed to help pay for the war against France. This tax is highly unpopular, with many people blaming Simon Sudbury, at this time both Lord Chancellor and Archbishop of Canterbury.
  - 30 May – Peasants' Revolt breaks out when the attempts of an official (John Brampton) to collect unpaid poll taxes in Brentwood, Essex, ends in violent confrontation.
  - 12 June – Peasants' Revolt: Rebels from Kent and Essex, led by Wat Tyler and Jack Straw, meet at Blackheath, London, where they are encouraged by a sermon from renegade Lollard priest John Ball. Suffolk rising begins.
  - 14 June – Peasants' Revolt: Rebels destroy John of Gaunt's Savoy Palace and storm the Tower of London, finding and beheading Simon Sudbury, and also Robert Hales, Lord High Treasurer. King Richard (age 14) meets the leaders of the revolt and agrees to reforms such as fair rents and the abolition of serfdom.
  - 15 June – Peasants' Revolt: During further negotiations, Wat Tyler is murdered by the King's entourage. Noble forces subsequently overpower the rebel army, the rebel leaders are captured and executed and Richard revokes his concessions.
  - 16 June – Peasants' Revolt: Townspeople of Cambridge sack buildings of the university in the town and burn official documents, with the slogan "Away with the learning of clerks, away with it!".
  - Late June to July – Peasant revolts spread to St Albans and East Anglia, but are quickly suppressed. Norfolk rebels are defeated at the Battle of North Walsham (25 or 26 June).
  - 15 July – John Ball is hanged, drawn and quartered in the presence of the King at St Albans for his part in the Peasants' Revolt.
  - 30 July – William Courtenay enthroned as Archbishop of Canterbury.
  - 3 November:
    - In response to the Peasants' Revolt, Parliament passes the Treason Act making the starting of a riot high treason.
    - Parliament passes the Forcible Entry Act 1381 making taking possession of property by force a statutory offence; this remains in force until 1977.
    - Parliament passes the first Navigation Act to give economic protection to English shipping.
- 1382
  - 14 January – marriage of King Richard II and Anne of Bohemia.
  - 21 May
    - An earthquake of scale 5.8 strikes Canterbury. Churches are damaged and shocks are felt in London.
    - The 'Earthquake Synod' is held in London: Archbishop of Canterbury William Courtenay attacks the Lollard movement led by John Wycliffe.
  - Winchester College is founded by William of Wykeham.
  - probable date – Geoffrey Chaucer writes the poem Parlement of Foules.
- 1383
  - 16 May – Henry le Despenser, Bishop of Norwich, leads a crusade against supporters of the Avignon Pope in Flanders.
  - October – Bishop of Norwich impeached, against the wishes of Parliament.
  - Act forbids maintenance, i.e. the protection of criminal retainers by their overlords.
- 1384
  - January – Hundred Years' War: John of Gaunt makes a temporary truce with France.
  - Katherine, Lady Berkeley, establishes a chantry school which will still exist at Wotton-under-Edge in Gloucestershire in the 21st century as Katharine Lady Berkeley's School, said to be the first school founded by a lay person, the first founded by a woman and the first to offer free education to anyone.
  - Alchemist John Dombleday writes Stella Alchimiae.
- 1385
  - 14 August – Portuguese troops and their English allies defeat those of Castile at the Battle of Aljubarrota.
  - 31 August – King Richard II begins an invasion of Scotland. The English burn Holyrood and Edinburgh, but return home without a decisive battle.
  - 20 October – licence permitting construction of Bodiam Castle in East Sussex is issued.
  - The Canterbury city walls are being repaired. The ancient Roman walls are in disrepair and there has been concern that the French might raid the city. Murage is used for raising the money.
  - King Richard II tries to rule the country without Parliament.
- 1386
  - 8 March – Richard recognises John of Gaunt as King of Castile, by right of his second marriage to the Infanta Constanza of Castile in 1371, and grants him control of all royal lands in Ireland.
  - 14 April – first scholars enter New College, Oxford, the first college of the University of Oxford to provide extensively for undergraduate education.
  - 9 May – King John I of Portugal and King Richard II ratify the Treaty of Windsor, an alliance of mutual support which will remain in force into the 21st century.
  - July – John of Gaunt leaves England to make good his claim to the Crown of Castile.
  - 1 October – the Wonderful Parliament opens in Westminster Abbey and sits for 2 months, initially to consider the King's demand for money but going on to appoint a commission to oversee the court and government.
  - (approx.) – Salisbury Cathedral clock is started. By the 21st century it will be the world's oldest working clock.
- 1387
  - 24–25 March – Hundred Years' War: English victory over a Franco-Castilian-Flemish fleet in the Battle of Margate off the coast of Margate.
  - 14 November – a group of powerful nobles known as Lords Appellant raise arms against the King, demanding the arrest of members of the royal court.
  - 20 December – Battle of Radcot Bridge: Lords Appellant defeat Richard's army. The king is imprisoned until he agrees to replace all the councillors in his court.
  - Geoffrey Chaucer begins writing The Canterbury Tales.
- 1388
  - February – the entire court of King Richard II is convicted of treason by the Merciless Parliament, under the influence of the Lords Appellant, and are all either executed or exiled. Richard II effectively becomes a puppet of the Lords Appellant.
  - 8 July – John of Gaunt makes peace with Castile and gives up his claim to the Castilian throne by allowing his daughter Katherine of Lancaster to marry Prince Henry, the eldest son of John I of Castile.
  - 5 August – Battle of Otterburn: a Scottish army, led by James Douglas, defeats an English army, capturing their leader, Harry Hotspur. Douglas is killed during the battle.
  - The completion of Wycliffe's Bible by John Purvey and the beginning of prosecution of Wycliffe's followers, the Lollards.
  - Statute of Cambridge places restrictions on the movements of labourers and beggars.
- 1389
  - 3 May – King Richard retakes control of the government.
  - 18 July – Truce of Leulinghem: England and France sign a truce, ending the second phase of the Hundred Years' War and bringing a 13-year peace.

== Births ==
- 1380
  - John de Sutton V, nobleman (died 1406)
- 1381
  - 13 October – Thomas FitzAlan, 12th Earl of Arundel, politician (died 1415)
- 1382
  - Richard de Beauchamp, 13th Earl of Warwick (died 1439)
- 1383
  - Anne of Gloucester, noblewoman (died 1438)
- 1384
  - 30 November – Thomas Grey, conspirator (executed 1415)
- 1385
  - 1 August – John FitzAlan, 13th Earl of Arundel (died 1421)
  - 15 August – Richard de Vere, 11th Earl of Oxford (died 1417)
  - Margaret Holland, Duchess of Clarence, noblewoman (died 1429)
- 1386
  - 16 September – King Henry V (in Monmouth) (died 1422)
- 1388
  - 29 September – Thomas of Lancaster, 1st Duke of Clarence, second son of King Henry IV (died 1421)
  - Juliana Berners, writer
  - Thomas Montacute, 4th Earl of Salisbury (died 1428)
- 1389
  - 20 June – John of Lancaster, 1st Duke of Bedford, regent (died 1435)

== Deaths ==
- 1381
  - 14 June – Simon Sudbury, Archbishop of Canterbury (killed)
  - 15 June
    - John Cavendish, Lord Chief Justice (killed)
    - Wat Tyler, rebel (killed)
  - 15 July – John Ball, renegade priest (executed)
  - 27 December – Edmund Mortimer, 3rd Earl of March, politician
- 1383
  - 8 June – Thomas Ros, 4th Baron Ros, Crusader (born 1338)
- 1384
  - 31 December – John Wycliffe, theologian, Bible translator and Catholic reform campaigner (born 1320s)
- 1385
  - 13 March – Katherine, Lady Berkeley, benefactress
  - 7 August – Joan of Kent, wife of Edward the Black Prince (born 1328)
- 1386
  - William Langland, poet (born 1332)
- 1387
  - Approximate date – Peter de la Mare, politician
- 1388
  - 19 February – Robert Tresilian, chief justice (executed)
  - 20 February – Nicholas Brembre, merchant (executed)
  - 4 March – Thomas Usk, author (executed)
  - 5 May – Simon Burley, Lord Warden of the Cinque Ports (born c. 1336; executed)
- 1389
  - 5 September – Michael de la Pole, 1st Earl of Suffolk, Lord Chancellor (born c. 1330; dies in exile)
