= 1390s in England =

Events from the 1390s in England.

== Incumbents ==
- Monarch – Richard II (to 30 September 1399), then Henry IV

== Events ==
- 1390
  - September – the future King Henry IV of England supports the Teutonic Knights at the siege of Vilnius in the Lithuanian Civil War.
  - 12 November – the Parliament of England, having been summoned on September 12 by King Richard, opens at Westminster, and the House of Commons elects Sir James Pickering as its Speaker.
  - 3 December – the King gives royal assent to numerous laws passed as the English Parliament adjourns after a 3-week session, including the Pardon of Offences Act (requiring the specification of the offense for which the person is being pardoned by the King) and the Enforcement of the 1351 Statute of Provisors (providing forfeiture of office for certain violations, such as accepting benefices from the Pope). Another statute forbids retainers from wearing livery whilst off-duty.
  - John Gower's poem Confessio Amantis is completed.
  - Approximate date – The Forme of Cury, the earliest collection of recipes in the English language, is written.
- 1391
  - 3 November–3 December – Parliament, summoned by the King on 7 September, meets at Westminster and re-asserts royal prerogatives. The King gives royal assent to Acts including the Forcible Entry Act 1391 (enforcing the Act of 1381) and the Admiralty Jurisdiction Act 1391.
- 1392
  - By April – Thomas of Woodstock, 1st Duke of Gloucester, is created Lieutenant of Ireland by his nephew the King but forbidden actually to travel there.
  - 29 May – following the Fleet Street riot in London, King Richard summons Lord Mayor of London, John Hende, along with the London sheriff and deputies and aldermen to appear before him at Nottingham Castle for a hearing on unspecified charges.
  - 25 June – at a hearing at Nottingham, the King Richard orders that Lord Mayor Hende is to be arrested, removed from office and imprisoned.
  - 22 July – after a second hearing at Nottingham, former London Mayor John Hende and other imprisoned city officials are assessed a fine and released from prison after posting bond to secure their return for future charges.
  - Penistone Grammar School, which will in the late 20th century become one of the first community comprehensive schools in England, is founded near Barnsley.
- 1393
  - 20 January – the English Parliament, summoned on November 23 last by King Richard, assembles at Winchester.
  - 10 February – the English Parliament adjourns after three weeks and the passage of numerous laws. Among the acts given royal assent are the Trade Act 1392 ("No merchant stranger shall buy or sell with another merchant stranger to sell again"), the Statute of Praemunire (which outlaws appealing an English court case to the Pope if the King of England objects, or for anyone to act in a way that recognises papal authority (such as Papal bulls or excommunications) over the authority of the king) and the Weights and Measures Act 1392 ("The clerk of the market shall carry with him all his weights and measures signed.")
  - 13 September – Sir Walter Devereux, a prominent knight of Herefordshire, is dispatched by King Richard to suppress the Lollards, activists, led by Walter Brut, seeking a reformation of the Catholic church in the county.
  - 3 October – Lollard leader Walter Brut is put on trial for heresy before the Bishop of Hereford, Thomas Trefnant, but is acquitted.
  - Hundred Years' War: Peace negotiations between England and France at Calais. Rebellion in northern England protesting at these negotiations is quickly suppressed.
  - The hammerbeam roof of Westminster Hall is commissioned from royal carpenter Hugh Herland.
  - Approximate date – Julian of Norwich begins to write Revelations of Divine Love about her sixteen mystical visions.
- 1394
  - 28 January – the English Parliament, summoned by King Richard, opens its session after having been summoned on November 13, 1393, and elects Sir John Bussy as speaker of the Commons.
  - 28 February – the King grants Geoffrey Chaucer 20 pounds a year for life, for his services as a diplomat and Clerk of The King's Works.
  - 6 March – the English Parliament closes after a 37-day session. Among the acts receiving royal assent are the Money Act (prohibiting the melting of money and the import of foreign money), the Cloths Act ("Every person may make cloth of what length and breadth he will."), and the Exportation of Corn Act (allowing all of the King's subjects to ship grain from the Kingdom).
  - 2 October – King Richard leads an expedition to Ireland to enforce his rule there. However, in the Battle of Ros-Mhic-Thriúin, the Kingdom of Leinster, led by King Art Óg Mac Murchadha Caomhánach (Art MacMurrough-Kavanagh), defeats the English army led by King Richard and Roger Mortimer, 4th Earl of March.
  - 11 December – John/Eleanor Rykener, a transvestite male prostitute (and embroiderer) working mainly in London, but also active in Oxford and elsewhere (and consorting with some who have taken religious vows), is interrogated by the Mayor of London following his arrest near Cheapside, leaving a rare surviving legal record from this period which mentions same-sex intercourse.
  - 25 December – Richard defines the borders of English rule in Ireland; later to become known as the English Pale.
  - First scholars enter Winchester College.
- 1395
  - 27 January–15 February – the 22nd English Parliament of King Richard meets after being summoned last November 20, with John Bussy as Speaker of the House of Commons.
  - 15 May – Richard leaves Ireland, having achieved his objectives.
  - 22 November – the embalmed body of Robert de Vere, 9th Earl of Oxford, a friend and advisor of King Richard, is buried in England on the 3rd anniversary of his death in France.
  - Lollard manifesto The Twelve Conclusions of the Lollards attached to the doors of St Paul's Cathedral and Westminster Abbey.
  - Approximate date – the "Gawain Poet" is active.
- 1396
  - 9 March – proxy marriage of Richard II of England and Isabella of Valois, leading to a 28-year truce in the Hundred Years' War with France.
  - 25 September – Thomas Arundel succeeds William Courtenay as Archbishop of Canterbury.
  - 31 October – marriage of the widowed Richard II of England (29) and 6-year-old Isabella of Valois, the daughter of Charles VI of France, in Calais.
  - 29 November – Ralph Neville, 1st Earl of Westmorland, marries Joan Beaufort.
- 1397
  - 8 January – 7-year-old Isabella of Valois is formally crowned as Queen consort of England at Westminster Abbey.
  - 22 January – the 23rd Parliament of King Richard assembles after having been summoned on 30 November last, and re-elects Sir John Bussy as the Speaker of the House of Commons.
  - 10 February – John Beaufort becomes Earl of Somerset.
  - 12 February – Parliament adjourns, and King Richard II gives royal assent to several acts passed, including the Act against riding with weapons, and barring the carrying of a lancegay (a light spear) except in wartime. Another law places a penalty on "him who taketh another's horse or best for the King's service without sufficient warrant.
  - 28 March – King Richard I of England and King Charles VI of France sign a treaty settling the final issues remaining from the War of the Breton Succession, restoring land confiscated from John IV, Duke of Brittany.
  - 8 June – Richard Whittington is nominated as Lord Mayor of London for the first time by King Richard II following the 6 June death of Adam Bamme.
  - 12 July – Richard II attempts to reassert authority over his kingdom by arresting members of the group of powerful barons known as the Lords Appellant.
  - September – Parliament condemns the Lords Appellant, impeaching Thomas of Woodstock, Duke of Gloucester (the King's uncle, who is murdered while under house arrest in Calais), Richard Fitzalan, 4th Earl of Arundel (who is attainted and executed) and Thomas Beauchamp, 12th Earl of Warwick (who is imprisoned).
  - 29 September – John Holland, Earl of Huntingdon is created Duke of Exeter by his half-brother Richard II. Thomas Holland, 3rd Earl of Kent, his brother, is created Duke of Surrey. In addition, Ralph Neville, Baron Neville is created first Earl of Westmorland; these are rewards for supporting the King against the Lords Appellant.
  - 13 October – Richard Whittington is overwhelmingly approved by London's freemen to serve as Lord Mayor of London after he has negotiated a deal to settle its debt to the King for £10,000.
  - 8 November – Roger Walden enthroned as Archbishop of Canterbury after Thomas Arundel is banished from the realm by King Richard II.
- 1398
  - 27 January – the 24th Parliament of Richard II of England, meeting since 17 September last at Shrewsbury, annuls the acts of the 1388 Parliament.
  - 31 January – Parliament is dissolved and the King gives royal assent to numerous laws, including the Treason Act 1397, providing for new definitions of treason (compassing the death of the King, making war against the King within the realm, attempting to repeal any judgments made by parliament convicting "certain traitors", or attempting to repeal the Treason Act itself.
  - 20 February – vicar John de Aston of Colston Bassett is released from incarceration at Fleet Prison by order of the King upon the payment of mainprise or bail.
  - 16 September – King Richard stops a duel between his cousin, Henry of Bolingbroke (the future Henry IV of England), and Thomas de Mowbray, 1st Duke of Norfolk.
  - October – King Richard II exiles both Henry Bolingbroke and the Duke of Norfolk for ten years in order to end their feud.
  - Mount Grace Priory is established in Yorkshire by Thomas Holland, 1st Duke of Surrey.
  - Glendalough monastery in Wicklow, Ireland, is destroyed by English troops.

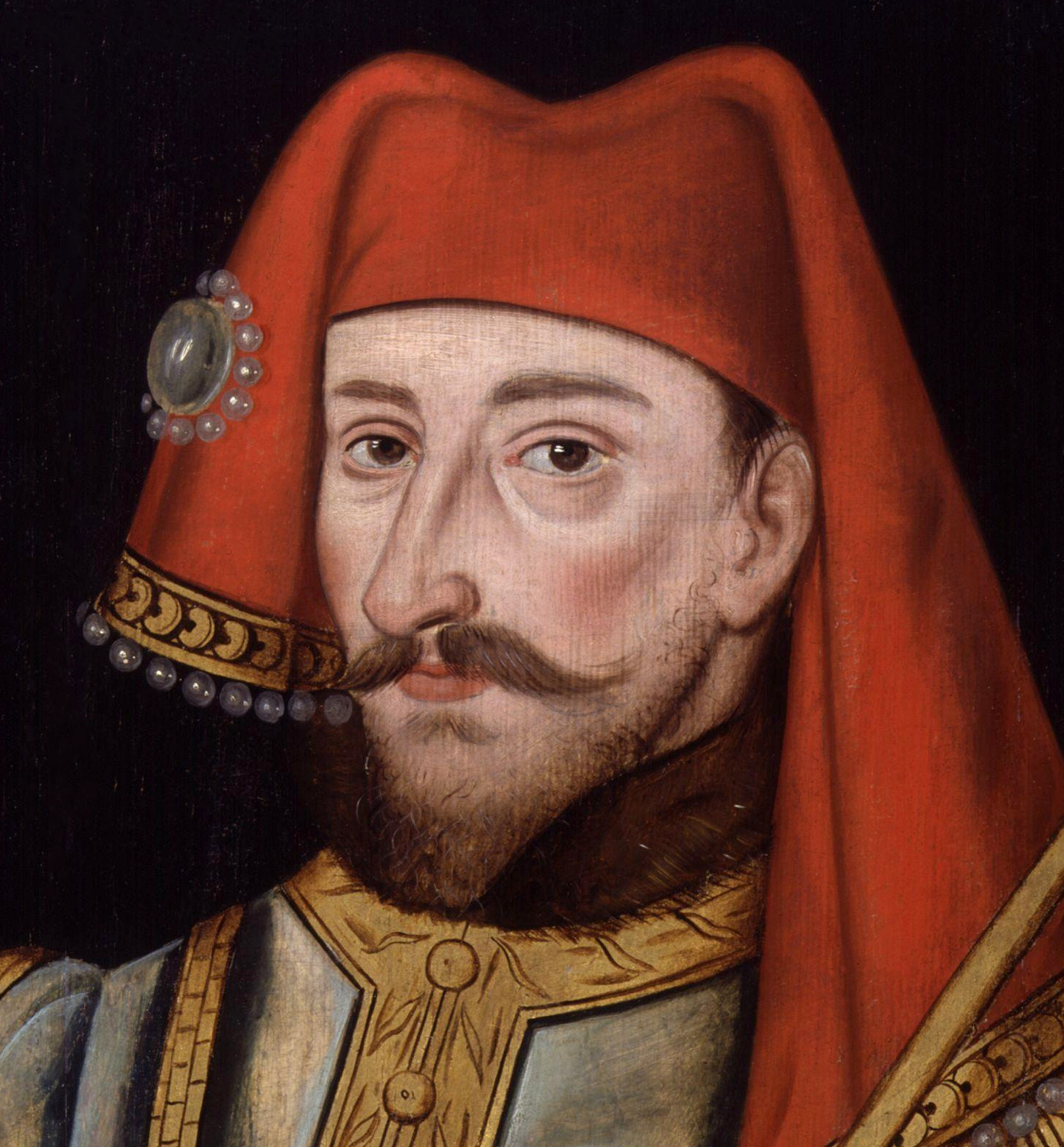
Henry IV of England.

- 1399
  - 3 February – death of John of Gaunt, uncle of King Richard II and father of Henry Bolingbroke, at Leicester Castle. Richard inherits his title of Duke of Aquitaine.
  - 18 March – Richard II cancels the legal documents allowing the exiled Henry Bolingbroke to inherit his father's land, leading to Henry's decision to overthrow Richard.
  - 23 April – Saint George's Day in England is first officially celebrated as a holiday.
  - 29 May – Richard travels to Ireland to suppress a rebellion, with inconclusive results.
  - 4 July – Henry Bolingbroke, with exiled former archbishop of Canterbury Thomas Arundel as an advisor, returns to England and begins a military campaign to reclaim his confiscated land.
  - 19 August – having returned from Ireland, Richard is taken prisoner by Henry's followers in Wales.
  - 1 September – Richard's place of imprisonment is moved to the Tower of London.
  - 29 September – abdication of Richard II, the second time for an English monarch.
  - 30 September – King Richard II of England surrenders his crown to Henry Bolingbroke at an assembly of the House of Lords at Westminster Hall in London, where articles of deposition are read to him by the Archbishop of Canterbury. Richard abdicates, and the Lords proclaim Bolingbroke as King Henry IV, the first ruler since the Norman Conquest whose mother tongue is English rather than French.
  - 13 October – coronation of Henry IV of England at Westminster Abbey.
  - 19 October – Thomas Arundel is restored as Archbishop of Canterbury, replacing Roger Walden.
  - December: Henry IV orders implementation of the Absentee Act of 1380 in Ireland, demanding that all who hold lands, benefices or offices there should reside there and defend the land against rebels.
  - First definite record of beer (rather than ale) being brewed in England, at Great Yarmouth by Peter Woutersone, a "Ducheman".

== Births ==
- 1390
  - 3 October – Humphrey, Duke of Gloucester (died 1447)
  - 27 December – Anne de Mortimer, claimant to the throne (died 1411)
  - John Dunstaple, composer (died 1453)
- 1391
  - 6 November – Edmund Mortimer, 5th Earl of March, politician (died 1425)
  - Thomas West, 2nd Baron West (died 1415)
- 1392
  - 3 February – Henry Percy, 2nd Earl of Northumberland (died 1455)
  - 3 August – John de Mowbray, 2nd Duke of Norfolk (born at Calais; died 1432)
  - 12 or 31 August – William Bonville, 1st Baron Bonville (executed 1461)
- 1394
  - Michael de la Pole, 3rd Earl of Suffolk (died 1415)
- 1395
  - 18 March – John Holland, 2nd Duke of Exeter, military leader (died 1447)
  - 7 September – Reginald West, 6th Baron De La Warr, politician (died 1427)
- 1396
  - 16 October – William de la Pole, 1st Duke of Suffolk (died 1450)
  - John de Ros, 7th Baron de Ros (died 1421)
- 1398
  - Approximate date
    - James Tuchet, 5th Baron Audley (killed 1459)
    - William Waynflete, born William Patten, Lord Chancellor and bishop of Winchester (died 1486)
- 1399
  - Approximate date – William Canynge, merchant (died 1474)

== Deaths ==
- 1390
  - 14 August – John FitzAlan, 2nd Baron Arundel, soldier (born 1364)
- 1392
  - John Arderne, surgeon (born 1307)
- 1393
  - 22 February – John Devereux, 1st Baron Devereux (year of birth unknown)
  - 6 August – John de Ros, 5th Baron de Ros (born 1365)
- 1394
  - 17 March – John Hawkwood, mercenary (born 1320)
  - 4 June – Mary de Bohun, wife of Henry IV (born c. 1369)
  - 7 June – Anne of Bohemia, queen of Richard II (plague) (born 1366)
- 1396
  - 31 July – William Courtenay, Archbishop of Canterbury (born c. 1342)
  - 29 November – Robert Ferrers, 2nd Baron Ferrers of Wem (born 1373)
  - John Beaumont, 4th Baron Beaumont, Constable of Dover Castle (born 1361)
- 1397
  - 25 April – Thomas Holland, 2nd Earl of Kent (born c. 1350)
  - 3 June – William de Montacute, 2nd Earl of Salisbury, military leader (born 1328)
  - 15 September – Adam Easton, Catholic Cardinal (year of birth unknown)
  - 21 September – Richard FitzAlan, 11th Earl of Arundel, military leader (executed) (born 1346)
- 1398
  - 20 July – Roger Mortimer, 4th Earl of March, heir to the throne of England (born 1374)
- 1399
  - 3 February – John of Gaunt, 1st Duke of Lancaster (born 1340)
  - 24 March – Margaret Plantagenet, Duchess of Norfolk (born c. 1320)
  - 29 July – William le Scrope, 1st Earl of Wiltshire (executed) (born 1350)
  - 22 September – Thomas de Mowbray, 1st Duke of Norfolk, politician (born 1366)
