= 1400s in England =

Events from the 1400s in the Kingdom of England.

== Incumbents ==
- Monarch – Henry IV

== Events ==
- 1400
  - January – Henry IV quells the Epiphany Rising and executes the Earls of Kent, Huntingdon and Salisbury and the Baron le Despencer for their attempt to have Richard II restored as King.
  - 14 February – death of the deposed Richard II in Pontefract Castle. His body is displayed in old St Paul's Cathedral, London, on 17 February before initial burial in Kings Langley Priory on 6 March.
  - February – Henry Percy (Hotspur) leads English incursions into Scotland.
  - 23 May – Newcastle upon Tyne is granted a new royal charter, creating it a county corporate.
  - 25 July – English invasion of Scotland (1400): Henry IV leads his army north from a muster at York.
  - Mid-August – the English army camp at Leith near Edinburgh but fail to besiege Edinburgh Castle.
  - 16 September – Owain Glyndŵr is proclaimed Prince of Wales by his followers and starts to attack English strongholds in north-east Wales, beginning the Glyndŵr Rising.
  - 24 September – Welsh rebels attempt to invade England, but are turned back at Welshpool.
  - October – Henry launches a punitive campaign against north Wales.
  - December – Manuel II Palaiologos becomes the only Byzantine Emperor ever to visit England, being entertained at Eltham Palace.
- 1401
  - Passing of the De heretico comburendo Act: the Archbishop of Canterbury pressures King Henry IV into outlawing as heretics anyone owning an English translation of the Bible. Death by burning is the punishment for heresy.
  - 2 March – William Sawtrey, a Lollard, is the first person to be burned at the stake at Smithfield, London.
  - June – Battle of Mynydd Hyddgen: outnumbered three to one, Welsh rebels defeat an Anglo-Flemish force near Aberystwyth.
  - June – the English Pale in Ireland is reduced to Dublin, County Kildare, County Louth and County Meath.
  - 2 November – Battle of Tuthill near Caernarfon: English and Welsh forces both sustain losses with no clear victor.
  - December – Glyndŵr firmly establishes control over northern Wales.
- 1402
  - 22 June
    - Battle of Nesbit Moor: an English force decisively defeats a returning Scottish raiding party.
    - Battle of Bryn Glas: Glyndŵr's Welsh army defeat the English on the England/Wales border; Edmund Mortimer, son of the 3rd Earl, is taken and defects to the Welsh cause.
  - August – Glamorgan joins Glyndŵr's revolt.
  - 14 September – Battle of Homildon Hill (Holmedon or Humbleton Hill): Northern English nobles led by Sir Henry Percy (Hotspur) and using longbows decisively defeat a Scottish raiding army and capture their leader, the Earl of Douglas.
  - September – the English Parliament passes penal Laws against Wales which stop the Welsh from gathering together, obtaining office, carrying arms and living in English towns. Any Englishman who marries a Welsh woman also comes under the laws.
- 1403
  - 7 February – King Henry IV of England marries as his second wife Joan of Navarre, the daughter of King Charles II of Navarre and widow of John IV, Duke of Brittany, at Winchester Cathedral.
  - 21 July – Battle of Shrewsbury: Henry IV defeats a rebel army led by "Hotspur" Percy who has allied with the Welsh prince Owain Glyndŵr. Percy is killed in the battle by an arrow in his face.
  - August – William du Chastel leads a French raid on Plymouth which causes substantial damage.
  - Late Summer – King Henry IV is beaten by Owain Glyndŵr at the Battle of Stalling Down.
  - October – a fleet organised by John Hawley of Dartmouth and Thomas Norton of Bristol seizes seven French merchant vessels in the English Channel.
  - November – a revenge raid on Brittany by Sir William Wilford captures 40 ships and causes considerable damage ashore.
  - December – local forces defeat an attempted French raid on the Isle of Wight under Waleran III, Count of Ligny.
  - A guild of stationers is founded in the City of London. As the Worshipful Company of Stationers and Newspaper Makers (the "Stationers' Company"), it continues to be a Livery Company in the 21st century.
- 1404
  - 14 January – the fourth Parliament of King Henry IV opens for a session of two months. Henry grants it the power to appoint Royal Councillors and hold them to account for expenditure.
  - 10 February – Thomas of Lancaster, the second son of Henry IV, becomes Admiral of the North and South, succeeding Admiral Thomas Beaufort.
  - 20 March – as the English Parliament adjourns, Henry IV gives royal assent to acts that have passed, including the Gold and Silver ("Multipliers") Act, intended to prohibit alchemists from performing transmutation of common substances into precious metals.
  - April or May – Battle of Blackpool Sands: local forces led by John Hawley defeat an attempted raid from Saint-Malo on the port of Dartmouth, Devon; the French commander, William du Chastel, is killed.
  - 14 June – Welsh rebel leader Owain Glyndŵr allies with France against the English. He has begun to hold parliamentary assemblies (first on 10 May at Dolgellau) and on 21 June is formally crowned Prince of Wales at Harlech.
  - 16 October – the 5th Parliament of Henry IV (summoned 25 August), nicknamed "The Unlearned Parliament" because Henry refuses to allow lawyers to sit, opens for a 4-week session in Coventry, closing on 13 November. Henry withdraws its powers of oversight over the Royal Council.
- 1405
  - 11 March – Battle of Grosmont (Monmouthshire): English defeat Welsh rebels.
  - April – Richard Scrope, Archbishop of York, joins Henry Percy, 1st Earl of Northumberland, and Lord Bardolf in a rebellion in northern England.
  - 5 May – Battle of Pwll Melyn (Usk): English defeat Welsh rebels.
  - 8 June – following the collapse of their revolt, Richard Scrope together with Thomas de Mowbray, 4th Earl of Norfolk, and Scrope's nephew, Sir William Plumpton, are tried by a special commission and beheaded at York. Scrope is the first English prelate to suffer judicial execution.
  - August – Welsh rebels, assisted by the French, unsuccessfully attack Worcester.
  - Hundred Years' War: French attack Aquitaine.
- 1406
  - 1 March – Parliament meets, and continues to sit until December, when it finally achieves its aims of nominating and ensuring the payment of members of the Royal Council.
  - 30 March – the heir to the Scottish throne, Prince James, having been captured by English pirates on 22 March, is detained in England. On 4 April he becomes King James I of Scotland on the death of his father but remains detained in England for 18 years.
  - 13 October – Richard Whittington is elected as Lord Mayor of London for his second full term.
  - English ships attack Brodick Castle on the Isle of Arran.
  - Eric of Pomerania marries Philippa, daughter of Henry IV.
  - Richard, Earl of Cambridge, marries Anne de Mortimer.
- 1407
  - October – Henry, Prince of Wales, besieges Welsh rebels at Aberystwyth.
  - Central tower of York Minster collapses.
  - David Holbache founds Oswestry School.
- 1408
  - February – Henry Percy, 1st Earl of Northumberland, and Lord Bardolf advance with troops from exile in Scotland to Thirsk where they issue a proclamation that they have come to relieve the people from unjust taxation.
  - 19 February – Battle of Bramham Moor: Thomas de Rokeby, Sheriff of Yorkshire, suppresses the Percy rebellion in the north, Percy and Bardolf both being killed.
  - September – Henry, Prince of Wales, retakes Aberystwyth from Owain Glyndŵr.
  - Glass painter John Thornton of Coventry completes the largest medieval window in England, at York Minster.
- 1409
  - January – the Welsh surrender Harlech Castle to the English.
  - 28 February – Henry, Prince of Wales, appointed Constable of Dover and Warden of the Cinque Ports.
  - Beverley Bar built as the North Gate of Beverley in the East Riding of Yorkshire.

== Births ==
- 1400
  - 25 December – John Sutton, 1st Baron Dudley, Lord Lieutenant of Ireland (died 1487)
  - Richard Neville, 5th Earl of Salisbury, English politician (died 1460)
- 1401
  - 26 November – Henry Beaufort, 2nd Earl of Somerset (died 1418)
- 1402
  - 15 August – Humphrey Stafford, 1st Duke of Buckingham (died 1460)
- 1403
  - Robert Wingfield, politician (died 1454)
- 1404
  - 25 March (baptism) – John Beaufort, 1st Duke of Somerset, military leader (died 1444)
  - Approximate date – Alice Chaucer, Duchess of Suffolk, courtier and patron of the arts (died 1475)
- 1406
  - 26 September – Thomas de Ros, 8th Baron de Ros, soldier and politician (died 1430)
- 1407
  - Thomas de Littleton, judge (born c. 1407)
- 1408
  - 14 February – John FitzAlan, 14th Earl of Arundel (died 1435)
  - 23 April – John de Vere, 12th Earl of Oxford (died 1462)

== Deaths ==
- 1400
  - 5 January
    - John Montacute, 3rd Earl of Salisbury, politician (executed) (born 1350)
    - Thomas Holland, 1st Duke of Surrey, politician (executed) (born 1374)
  - 13 January – Thomas le Despenser, 1st Earl of Gloucester, politician (executed) (born 1373)
  - 16 January – John Holland, 1st Duke of Exeter, politician (executed) (born c. 1352)
  - 14 February – King Richard II (possibly murdered) (born 1367)
  - 21 August – Henry Yevele, master mason (born c. 1320)
  - 25 October – Geoffrey Chaucer, poet (born c. 1343)
  - Ralph Strode, scholar (born 1350)
  - Winter 1400/01 – Alice Perrers, mistress of King Edward III (born c. 1348)
- 1401
  - March – William Sawtrey, Lollard martyr (burned at the stake) (year of birth unknown)
  - 8 April (or 8 August) – Thomas Beauchamp, 12th Earl of Warwick (born 1338)
- 1402
  - 1 August – Edmund of Langley, 1st Duke of York, son of King Edward III (born 1341)
- 1403
  - 10 May – Katherine Swynford, widow of John of Gaunt (born c. 1350)
  - 12 May – William de Lode, prior (year of birth unknown)
  - 21 July
    - Henry Percy, soldier (killed in battle) (born 1364/1366)
    - Edmund Stafford, 5th Earl of Stafford (killed in battle) (born 1378)
  - 23 July – Thomas Percy, 1st Earl of Worcester, rebel (executed) (born 1343)
- 1404
  - 27 September – William of Wykeham, bishop and statesman (born 1320)
- 1405
  - 12 January – Eleanor Maltravers, noblewoman (born 1345)
  - 17 August – Thomas West, 1st Baron West (born 1335)
- 1406
  - 6 January – Roger Walden, bishop (year of birth unknown)
- 1408
  - 20 February – Henry Percy, 1st Earl of Northumberland, statesman (born 1341)
  - 10/11 April – Elizabeth le Despenser, noblewoman (year of birth unknown)
  - 30 December – John Hawley, merchant, mayor and MP for Dartmouth and privateer (born c. 1340s)
- 1409
  - January – Sir Edmund Mortimer, son of the 3rd Earl of March, rebel (born 1376)
  - 22 May – Blanche of England, sister of King Henry V (born 1392)
  - Thomas Merke, bishop (year of birth unknown)
