= 1040s in England =

Events from the 1040s in England.

== Incumbents ==
- Monarch – Harold I (to 17 March 1040), Harthacanute (17 March 1040 to 8 June 1042), then Edward the Confessor

== Events ==
- 1040
  - 17 March – Harold Harefoot dies.
  - June – Harthacnut lands at Sandwich, Kent, and becomes King of England.
- 1041
  - Rebellion in Worcester against Harthacnut's naval taxes.
  - Siward, Earl of Northumbria, kills Eadwulf IV of Bamburgh with the connivance of Harthacnut, possibly incorporating Bernicia into his Earldom of Northumbria thereafter.
  - Harthacnut invites his half-brother Edward the Confessor to return to England from exile in Normandy as his heir as king of England, with the support of Godwin, Earl of Wessex, and Bishop Ælfwine of Winchester. Edward meets "the thegns of all England" on the coast of Hampshire and is received as heir to the kingdom in return for his oath that he will continue the laws of Cnut.
- 1042
  - 8 June – Harthacnut collapses and soon after dies during the wedding celebrations of Tovi the Proud at Lambeth and is succeeded by his half-brother Edward the Confessor as King.
  - Encomium Emmae Reginae, a biography of the dowager Emma of Normandy, twice queen consort of England, is completed.
- 1043
  - 3 April – coronation of Edward the Confessor at Winchester Cathedral.
  - 16 November – Queen Emma accused of treason and her ally Stigand, Bishop of East Anglia, is dismissed.
  - Earl Leofric of Mercia founds Coventry Abbey; according to legend, his wife Godiva rides naked through the town in protest at taxes to fund the abbey.
- 1044
  - King Edward pardons Emma and Stigand.
- 1045
  - Marriage of King Edward and Edith of Wessex.
- 1046
  - 10 April – Leofric appointed Bishop of Crediton and Bishop of Cornwall.
  - Earl Sweyn Godwinson is exiled after kidnapping the Abbess of Leominster during an invasion of south Wales.
  - Ealdred, Bishop of Worcester, leads troops on an unsuccessful punitive raid against Welsh leaders Gruffydd ap Rhydderch, Rhys ap Rhydderch and Gruffydd ap Llywelyn.
  - Exeter Book of poetic riddles completed.
- 1048
  - Last Viking raid on England; unsuccessful raiders flee to Flanders.
  - King Edward goes to war against Flanders, blockading the English Channel with a fleet based at Sandwich.
- 1049
  - Sweyn Godwinson returns from exile, murders his cousin, and is exiled again.

== Births ==
- Cristina, daughter of Edward the Exile
- 1045
  - Saint Margaret of Scotland daughter of Edgar Ætheling (died 1093)

== Deaths ==
- 1040
  - 17 March – King Harold Harefoot (born c. 1015)
  - 14 August – King Duncan I of Scotland (born ca. 1001)
- 1042
  - 8 June – King Harthacanute (born 1018)
