= 1230s in England =

Events from the 1230s in England.

== Incumbents ==
- Monarch – Henry III

== Events ==
- 1230
  - 3 May – King Henry III leads an army to France, and marches on Bordeaux.
  - October – Henry returns to England.
  - Devotional work Ancrene Wisse written.
- 1231
  - Spring – Henry fights a campaign against Llywelyn the Great in Wales.
  - June – Llywelyn captures Cardigan Castle and defeats the English, forcing a truce which in December becomes a peace.
  - 13 August – Henry orders the sheriffs of Hampshire, Dorsetshire and Wiltshire to give Simon de Montfort the possession of the lands of his father, Simon de Montfort the elder. The younger de Montfort expels the Jews from the city of Leicester which he controls.
  - 24 September – Ralph Neville enthroned as Archbishop of Canterbury.
  - Peter des Roches, Bishop of Winchester, negotiates a 3-year truce with France.
  - The University of Cambridge is recognised by a royal writ of authority over its townspeople.
- 1232
  - Pope Gregory IX quashes the election of Ralph Neville as Archbishop of Canterbury.
  - 16 March – John of Sittingbourne elected to the Archbishopric of Canterbury.
  - 12 June – John of Sittingbourne's election to the Archbishopric of Canterbury quashed.
  - 29 July – Henry III dismisses justiciar and regent Hubert de Burgh and replaces him with his Poitevin royal favourites Peter de Rivaux and Peter des Roches.
  - 26 August – John Blund elected to the Archbishopric of Canterbury.
  - 10 November – Hubert de Burgh is stripped of his offices and imprisoned for life.
  - The Domus Conversorum ("House of the Converts"), a building and institution in London for Jewish converts to Christianity, is established by Henry III.
- 1233
  - 1 June – John Blund's election to the Archbishopric of Canterbury quashed.
  - August – Richard Marshal, 3rd Earl of Pembroke allies with Llywelyn against Henry III.
  - Peter des Roches takes control of the exchequer and the kingdom's finances.
  - Stow Fair, Lincolnshire, inaugurated.
  - A storm damages the port of Winchelsea.
- 1234
  - 2 April – Pope Gregory IX consecrates Edmund Rich as Archbishop of Canterbury.
  - 16 April – Richard Marshal murdered, defending his estates against Henry's supporters.
  - April – Peter de Rivaux and Peter des Roches fall from power.
  - July – Llywelyn makes peace with Henry III, retaining control of Cardiganshire.
  - 2 December – a royal decree prohibits institutes of legal education within the City of London.
  - Court of King's Bench established.
- 1235
  - 15 July – marriage of Isabella of England to Frederick II, Holy Roman Emperor.
  - August – five-year truce with France signed.
  - Final conquest of Connacht in Ireland by the Hiberno-Norman Richard Mór de Burgh.
  - The Statute of Merton, considered the first statute of the realm, is agreed at Merton between Henry III and the barons of England. It clarifies property rights and empowers secular courts to determine issues of legitimacy.
  - Famine in England; 20,000 die in London.
  - Probable date – Lancaster Royal Grammar School is founded.
- 1236
  - 14 January – Henry III marries 14-year-old Eleanor of Provence, one of the four daughters of Ramon Berenguer IV, Count of Provence, at Canterbury Cathedral, with Simon de Montfort, as Lord High Steward, taking care of the banquet. Eleanor is crowned queen at Westminster Abbey shortly afterwards.
  - 6 May – on the death of Roger of Wendover, Benedictine monk and chronicler of St Albans Abbey, the Chronica Majora is continued by Matthew Paris.
  - A tournament at Tickhill in Yorkshire turns into a battle between northerners and southerners, but peace is restored by the papal legate.
- 1237
  - January – at the insistence of the barons, Henry enlarges the royal Council, in return for the imposition of a new tax.
  - 25 September – Treaty of York signed between Scotland and England establishes the border between the two countries.
  - Henry III installs a leopard house at the Tower of London.
- 1237 or 1239 – the main tower of Lincoln Cathedral collapses.
- 1238
  - 7 January – Simon de Montfort, 6th Earl of Leicester, marries Eleanor, sister of Henry III and widow of William Marshal, 2nd Earl of Pembroke, secretly in the Palace of Westminster.
  - 22 February – Henry III promises to make reforms demanded by the barons.
- 1239
  - 23 October – Wells Cathedral dedicated.
  - November – first record of Mabel of Bury St. Edmunds, embroiderer.

== Births ==
- 1231
  - John de Warenne, 6th Earl of Surrey (died 1304)
  - Roger Mortimer, 1st Baron Wigmore (died 1282)
- 1238
  - November – Henry de Montfort, son of Simon de Montfort, 6th Earl of Leicester (died 1265)
- 1239
  - 17 June – King Edward I of England (died 1307)
  - Approximate date – Robert Burnell, bishop and Lord Chancellor (died 1292)
  - Paul Baile

== Deaths ==
- 1230
  - 25 October – Gilbert de Clare, 5th Earl of Gloucester, soldier (born 1180)
  - Nicolaa de la Haye, noblewoman and castellan (born 1150s)
- 1231
  - 6 April – William Marshal, 2nd Earl of Pembroke (born 1190)
  - 3 August – Richard le Grant, Archbishop of Canterbury, dies in Italy (year of birth unknown)
- 1232
  - 26 October – Ranulf de Blondeville, 6th Earl of Chester (born 1170)
- 1234
  - 16 April – Richard Marshal, 3rd Earl of Pembroke (year of birth unknown)
- 1235
  - 7 February – Hugh of Wells, Bishop of Lincoln (year of birth unknown)
- 1236
  - 6 May – Roger of Wendover, Benedictine monk and chronicler (year of birth unknown)
- 1237
  - 15 April – Richard Poore, Bishop of Durham (translated from Salisbury) (year of birth unknown)
- 1238
  - 4 March – Joan of England, Queen of Scotland, consort (born 1210)
  - 9 June – Peter des Roches, Bishop of Winchester (year of birth unknown)
  - Hugh le Despenser, sheriff (year of birth unknown)
- 1239
- 21 December
  - Henry de Turberville, noble and knight (year of birth unknown)
  - Richard Wilton, scholastic philosopher (year of birth unknown)
