= 1140s in England =

Events from the 1140s in England.

== Incumbents ==
- Monarch – Stephen (to 8 April 1141), Matilda (8 April to 1 November 1141), then Stephen

== Events ==
- 1140
  - December – The Anarchy: Earl Ranulf of Chester, an opponent of King Stephen, captures Lincoln.
- 1141
  - 2 February – The Anarchy: At the First Battle of Lincoln, Robert, 1st Earl of Gloucester and his half-sister Empress Matilda wrest control of the throne from King Stephen, who is captured and imprisoned.
  - 8 April – The Anarchy: Matilda is proclaimed "Lady of the English".
  - 24 June – The Anarchy: Matilda is forced to flee Westminster during a royal banquet, and flees to Oxford.
  - July – The Anarchy: Matilda of Boulogne, wife of Stephen, recaptures London.
  - 14 September – The Anarchy: Rout of Winchester: Robert of Gloucester is captured by forces loyal to Stephen during fighting at Winchester.
  - 1 November – The Anarchy: Stephen and Robert are exchanged as prisoners ending the reign of Matilda.
- 1142
  - Queen Matilda grants the church of Oakley, Buckinghamshire, with its chapels of Brill, Boarstall and Addingrove, to the monks of the Priory of St Frideswide, Oxford.
  - c. Summer – A group of Anglo-Norman independent crusaders led by William and Ralph Vitalus help King Afonso I Henriques of Portugal in a failed Siege of Lisbon before continuing on their way to the Holy Land.
  - Autumn – The Anarchy: 9-year-old Henry of Anjou, a son of Empress Matilda, lands in England for the first time, on the south coast, with his uncle, Robert, 1st Earl of Gloucester, and several knights. He travels to Bristol, centre of Angevin opposition to King Stephen, where he is educated by Master Matthew. Meanwhile, Robert captures Lulworth Castle, Rufus Castle ("Bow and Arrow Castle") on the Isle of Portland and Wareham Castle.
  - 26 September – The Anarchy: Stephen captures Oxford, and besieges Matilda inside the castle.
  - December – The Anarchy: Matilda escapes from Oxford Castle across the snow in a white cape for camouflage and safely reaches Abingdon. The next day Oxford Castle surrenders to Stephen and Matilda rides with an escort to Wallingford Castle where she seeks refuge.
- 1143
  - 1 July – The Anarchy: Battle of Wilton – Robert, 1st Earl of Gloucester, defeats Stephen at Wilton.
  - The Anarchy: Geoffrey de Mandeville, a supporter of Matilda, is deprived of his castles in Essex, but subsequently captures Ely and campaigns in Cambridgeshire.
  - Robert of Ketton makes the first European translation of the Qur'an into Latin.
- 1144
  - 11 February – Robert of Chester completes the translation of Book on the Composition of Alchemy from Arabic to Latin. It is the first book in Europe to describe alchemy.
  - 22 March – A young apprentice, William of Norwich, is murdered, a crime attributed to the Jews by the Norwich mob, the first known medieval accusation of blood libel against Jews.
  - Matilda's husband Geoffrey of Anjou completes the conquest of Normandy.
- 1145
  - The Anarchy: Stephen captures Faringdon Castle.
  - Woburn Abbey founded.
  - Robert of Chester makes the first translation of an algebra text from Arabic into Latin.
- 1146
  - The Anarchy: Ranulf of Chester is captured, but released after surrendering his castles.
- 1147
  - The Anarchy: 14-year-old Henry arrives in England with a small force to fight for his mother Matilda and penetrates as far as Wiltshire, but is defeated in skirmishes, and, with intervention by Stephen, returns to Normandy.
  - The Anarchy: Ranulf of Chester lays waste to the land around Coventry, but fails to capture the city itself.
  - Late Spring – An expedition of Crusaders leaves from Dartmouth, Devon, for the Second Crusade to the Holy Land, Englishmen together with forces from Flanders, Frisia, Scotland and some German polities. Leadership is provided by Hervey de Glanvill, a Norman nobleman and constable of Suffolk, who leads a fleet of some 200 ships. Bad weather forces them to take refuge at the mouth of the Douro in Portugal on 16 June.
  - 25 October – Reconquista: Siege of Lisbon – King Afonso I of Portugal conquers Lisbon from the Moorish Taifa of Badajoz after a four-month siege, with support of English, Flemish and German Crusaders, and the defenders are bloodily massacred.
- 1148
  - February – The Anarchy: Empress Matilda is forced to return to Normandy.
- 1149
  - 22 May – King David I of Scotland knights his great-nephew Henry (who has returned from Normandy), and cedes northern Lancashire to Ranulf of Chester, in return for control of Carlisle.
  - King David I of Scotland attempts to wrest control of the Bishopric of Durham and the Archbishopric of York from Stephen, but fails.

== Births ==
- 1140
  - William FitzRalph, future Sheriff of Nottingham and seneschal of Normandy
- 1146
  - William Marshal, 1st Earl of Pembroke, soldier and statesman (died 1219)
- 1147
  - Hugh de Kevelioc, 3rd Earl of Chester (died 1181)

== Deaths ==
- 1140
  - 6 February – Thurstan, Archbishop of York (born c. 1070 in Normandy)
- 1141
  - May – Aubrey de Vere, Lord Great Chamberlain (born 1062)
- 1142
  - Approximate date – Orderic Vitalis, chronicler (born 1075)
- 1143
  - Approximate date – William of Malmesbury, historian (born 1080)
- 1144
  - September – Geoffrey de Mandeville, 1st Earl of Essex, rebel and outlaw, killed in battle
- 1147
  - 31 October – Robert, 1st Earl of Gloucester, politician (born c. 1090)
- 1148
  - 3 January – Anselm of St Saba, abbot of Bury St Edmunds (born 1136 in Italy)
  - 6 January
    - Gilbert de Clare, 1st Earl of Pembroke (born c. 1100)
    - William de Warenne, 3rd Earl of Surrey, killed on crusade (born 1119)
  - 30 January (approximate date) – Serlo (abbot of Cirencester)
