= 1250s in England =

Events from the 1250s in England.

== Incumbents ==
- Monarch – Henry III

== Events ==
- 1250
  - 1 October – A storm damages the port of Winchelsea.
  - Gascons revolt against English governor Simon de Montfort.
  - First written reference to Summer is icumen in, one of the oldest known English song lyrics.
- 1251
  - May – Simon de Montfort suppresses the revolt in Gascony.
  - 26 December – King Alexander III of Scotland marries Margaret, daughter of Henry III, precipitating a power struggle between the two monarchs.
- 1252
  - 14 January – A storm further damages the port of Winchelsea.
  - 10 April – Ilkeston is granted a royal charter for a market and fair, which continue into the 21st century.
  - September – Henry III receives a gift of a polar bear from Norway, which he allows to swim in the Thames.
  - Gascon leaders travel to England to put their case against Simon de Montfort, who eventually resigns.
- 1253
  - 6 August – Expedition by Henry III to Gascony to repel a rumoured invasion from Castile. Eleanor of Provence is regent and de facto Lord Chancellor in England during her husband's absence.
  - Simon de Montfort returns to England where he allies himself with barons who oppose Henry III.
  - John Maunsell becomes England's first Secretary of State.
- 1254
  - 11 February – Parliament is summoned, for the first time including elected representatives; two knights from each shire.
  - 1 April – Treaty of Toledo ensures peace between England and Castile.
  - 26 April – A Parliament assembles which refuses to grant a subsidy to Henry III.
  - 1 November – Edward Plantagenet (the future Edward I, aged 15) marries Eleanor of Castile (aged c. 13) at the Abbey of Santa María la Real de Las Huelgas, Burgos. His father Henry III has demanded the marriage in exchange for ending the war with her brother Alfonso X of Castile.
- 1255
  - August
    - Henry III has his supporters put in control of the Scottish regency council.
    - Following the death of "Little Saint Hugh of Lincoln", in an instance of blood libel, nineteen Jews of Lincoln are executed by royal command on suspicion of being involved in the boy's murder.
  - A survey of royal privileges in England is conducted, which is included in the Hundred Rolls.
  - King Louis IX of France gifts Henry with an elephant, which he keeps in the Tower of London.
  - Approximate date – Benedictine cell established on the Farne Islands.
- 1256
  - Summer – Bad weather produces a poor grain harvest.
  - Coggeshall in Essex is granted a weekly market, which will still be held more than 750 years later.
  - Earliest recorded endowment of Abingdon School.
- 1257
  - 13 January – Richard, 1st Earl of Cornwall elected King of the Romans.
  - August – A gold penny is introduced, but swiftly withdrawn when its bullion value proves greater than its twenty pence face value.
  - c. September – 1257 Samalas eruption: Mount Samalas volcano erupts on Lombok Island in Indonesia; the resultant climatic changes combine with a second successive poor grain harvest this summer in Britain to produce famine, killing an estimated 17,000 in Britain (15,000 in London).
  - Brothers of Penitence (Fratres Saccati, 'Brothers of the Sack') first settle in England, in London.
- 1258
  - 2 May – Simon de Montfort, together with six other barons, forces Henry III to accept legal reforms.
  - 12 June – Provisions of Oxford enacted, creating an elected Council of barons to advise the King.
  - 29 September – Consecration of the newly rebuilt Salisbury Cathedral.
  - 27 October to 4 November – The Oxford Parliament assembles, with Peter de Montfort presiding.
  - Irish, assisted by Scottish gallowglasses, halt the English advance westward through Ireland.
- 1259
  - 1 August – Henry III makes peace with Llywelyn ap Gruffudd, who now claims the title Prince of Wales.
  - 13 October – Provisions of Westminster enacted, reforming the legal system.
  - 4 December – By the Treaty of Paris, Henry III renounces his claim to Normandy to Louis IX of France.

== Births ==
- 1252
  - Eleanor de Montfort, princess of Wales (died 1282)

== Deaths ==
- 1250
  - 8 February – William II Longespee, crusader, killed in action (born c. 1212)
- 1253
  - 3 April – Richard of Chichester, bishop, canonised (born 1197)
  - 9 October – Robert Grosseteste, Bishop of Lincoln, scholastic philosopher and statesman (born c. 1175)
- 1254
  - 28 March – William de Ferrers, 5th Earl of Derby (born 1193)
  - Spring – Silvester de Everdon, Lord Chancellor of England and Bishop of Carlisle (year of birth unknown)
  - c. July – William of Nottingham I, Franciscan Provincial superior (year of birth unknown)
- 1255
  - 1 May – Walter de Gray, Lord Chancellor of England and Archbishop of York (year of birth unknown)
  - 27 August – Little Saint Hugh of Lincoln, supposed martyr (born 1247)
- 1256
  - 21 September – William of Kilkenny, Lord Chancellor of England and Bishop of Ely (year of birth unknown)
  - Approximate date – Johannes de Sacrobosco, scholar (born c. 1195)
- 1258
  - 14 August – John of Wallingford, abbot and historian
- 1259
  - 18 November – Adam Marsh, scholar and theologian (born c. 1200)
  - Matthew Paris, Benedictine monk, chronicler and cartographer (born c. 1200)
