= 1080s in England =

Events from the 1080s in England.

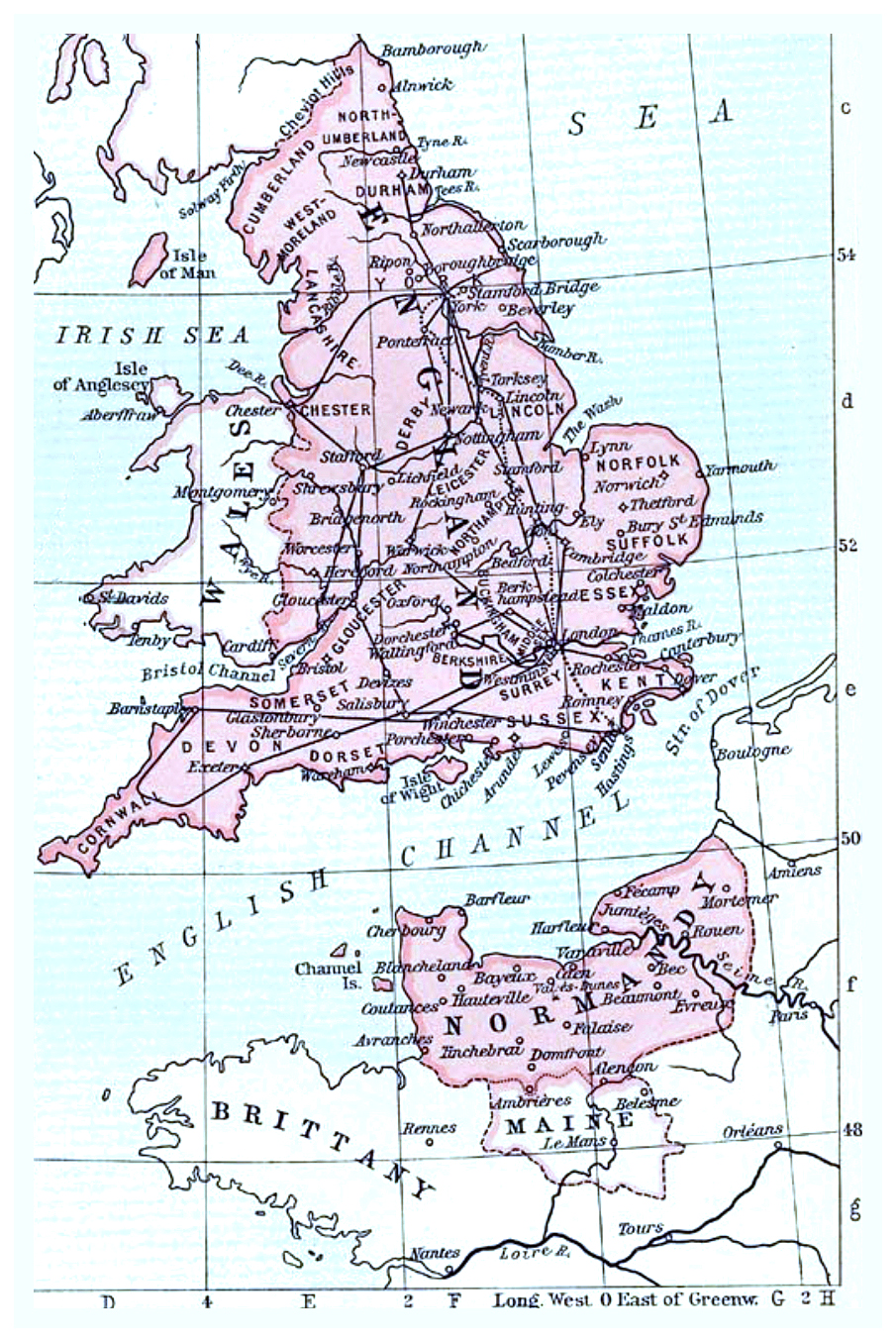
C. 1087 Dominions of William the Conqueror

== Incumbents ==
- Monarch – William I (to 9 September 1087), then William II

== Events ==
- 1080
  - 14 May – Walcher, Bishop of Durham, is killed by rebel Northumbrians; King William I sends his half-brother Odo of Bayeux to pacify Northumbria.
  - Autumn – William's son Robert Curthose sent to invade Scotland; reaches as far as Falkirk.
  - Robert Curthose builds a castle on the River Tyne which becomes Newcastle upon Tyne.
  - Osmund, bishop of Salisbury, builds Devizes Castle.
  - Gundulf of Rochester begins building of Rochester Cathedral.
  - William I, in a letter, refuses to accept Pope Gregory VII as his overlord.
- 1081
  - William campaigns in Wales, reaching as far as St David's.
  - Construction of Ely Cathedral begins.
- 1082
  - Odo of Bayeux arrested, and forfeits his Earldom and estates.
  - Bayeux Tapestry completed by this date (if not by 1077).
- 1083
  - William faces a revolt in the province of Maine in Normandy.
- 1084
  - Construction of Worcester Cathedral begins.
- 1085
  - Threatened invasion by Canute IV of Denmark aborted after a rebellion there.
  - 25 December – William commissions the Domesday Book.
- 1086
  - 1 August – Domesday Book is presented to William at Old Sarum.

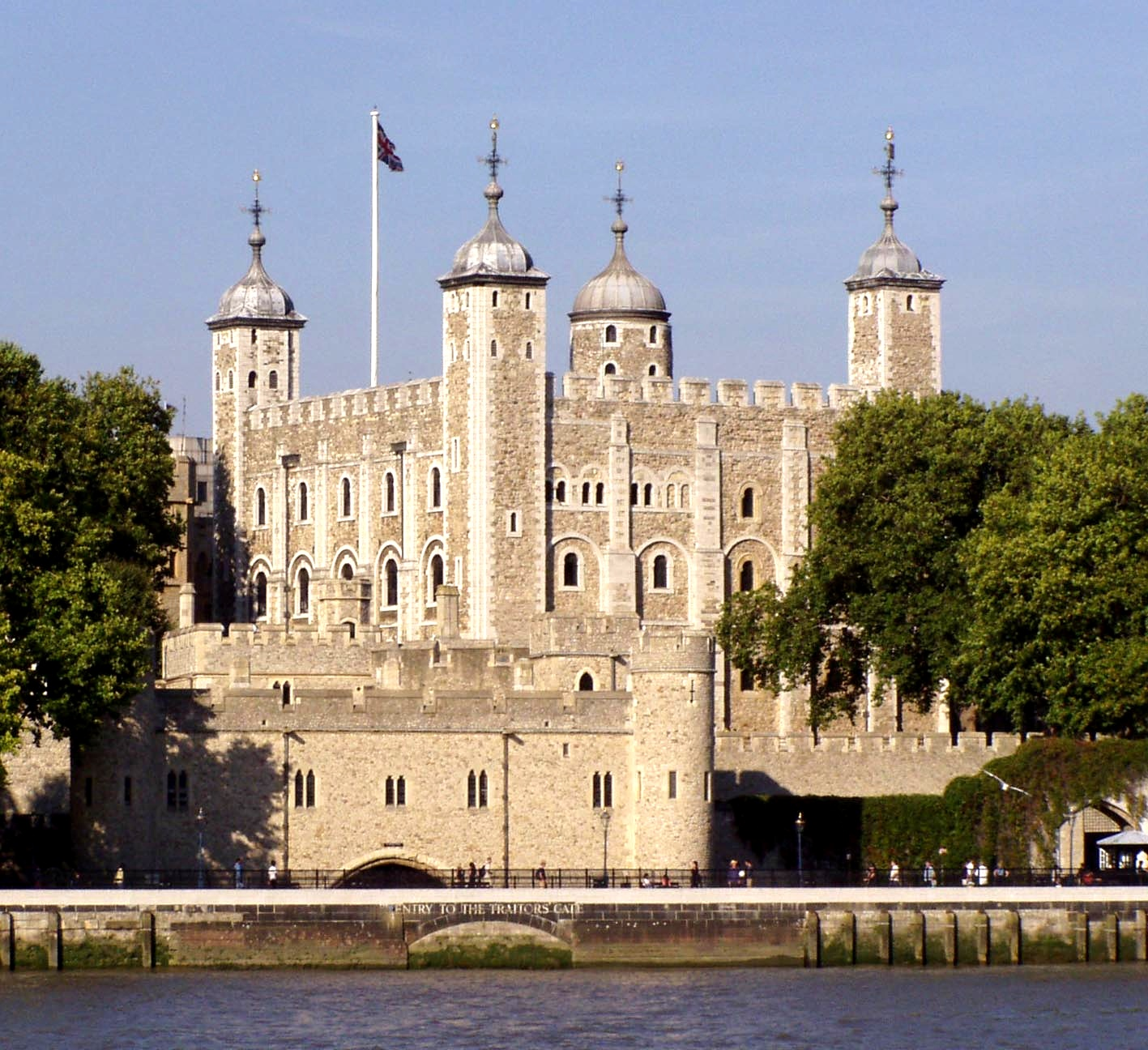
White Tower (Tower of London)

- 1087
  - 9 September – William I of England (William the Conqueror) dies at Rouen while on campaign in northern France; his first son Robert succeeds him as Robert II, Duke of Normandy whilst his second son succeeds him on the English throne as William II of England.
  - 26 September – coronation of William II at Westminster Abbey.
  - 25 December – Odo of Bayeux re-instated as Earl of Kent.
  - An early fire of London destroys much of the city including St Paul's Cathedral.
- 1088
  - April – The Rebellion of 1088 led by William the Conqueror's half-brothers Odo of Bayeux and Robert (2nd Earl of Cornwall), begins against Odo's nephew King William II with the aim to remove him from the throne. Odo's revolt in Kent and Sussex is supported by nobles across the country.
  - The Worcestershire rebellion led by Robert de Lacy (a son of Ilbert de Lacy) is dealt with quickly by Wulfstan, bishop of Worcester, who calls on those knights and local landowners still loyal to William II to defend Worcester. Many of the rebels are captured or killed.
  - William II calls the representatives of the fyrd to a meeting in London. He promises (with the support of Lanfranc, bishop of Canterbury) the people better laws, and the removal of taxes if they support him against the rebels.
  - William II lays siege to Pevensey Castle where Odo of Bayeux has taken shelter with Robert. Odo is forced to surrender, and agrees to go to Rochester to convince the rebels to accept William as the rightful king of England.
  - July – William II lays siege to Rochester Castle and puts down the revolt. Odo of Bayeux and the rebels surrender (only agreeing that their lives will be spared). William takes Odo's lands and exiles him to Normandy. The church of Gloucester Abbey and Tonbridge Castle are among the places laid waste in the rebellion.
  - Construction of the White Tower of the Tower of London probably largely completed.
- 1089
  - May – See of Canterbury left vacant after the death of Lanfranc.
  - Construction begins on Gloucester Cathedral and Tewkesbury Abbey.

== Births ==
- 1080
  - Adelard of Bath, scholar (died c. 1152)
  - Aubrey de Vere II, Lord Great Chamberlain (died 1141)
  - Henry of Huntingdon, historian (died 1160)
- 1083
  - Gilbert of Sempringham, founder of the Gilbertine Order (died c. 1190)

== Deaths ==
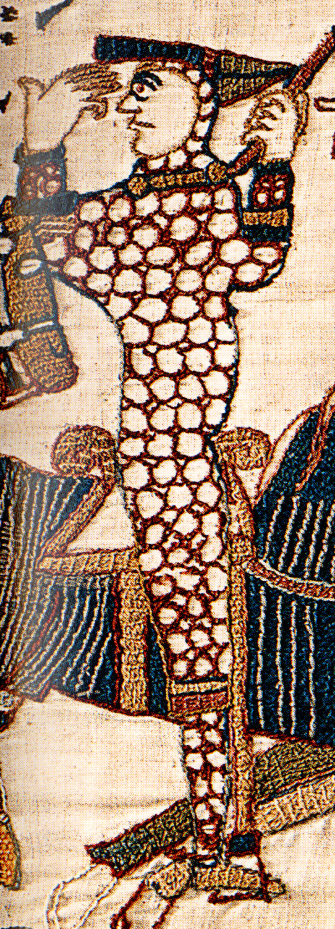
William the Conqueror

- 1080
  - 14 May – Walcher, Bishop of Durham
- 1083
  - 2 November – Matilda of Flanders, wife of King William I of England (born c. 1031, France)
- 1085
  - 27 March – Walter de Lacy, Norman noble
- 1087
  - 9 September – William I of England (born c. 1028, Normandy)
- 1088
  - William de Warenne, 1st Earl of Surrey
- 1089
  - 24 May – Lanfranc, Archbishop of Canterbury (born c. 1005, Lombardy)
