= 1370s in England =

Events from the 1370s in England.

== Incumbents ==
- Monarch – Edward III (to 21 June 1377), then Richard II.

== Events ==
- 1370
  - 19 September – Hundred Years' War: Siege of Limoges – The English led by Edward the Black Prince retake the city from the French by storm with wide destruction.
- 1371
  - 28 March – The London Charterhouse, a Carthusian monastery, is founded in Aldersgate.
  - 21 September – John of Gaunt marries as his second wife Constance of Castile (daughter of King Peter of Castile), giving him a claim to the throne of Castile.
- 1372
  - June – Owain Lawgoch claims the title Prince of Wales, sails with French support from Harfleur and raids Guernsey in preparation for an attack on Wales.
  - 22 June – Hundred Years' War: the English fleet is defeated at the Battle of La Rochelle by a Castilian-French fleet. Owain Lawgoch fights alongside the French.
  - 10 July – The Treaty of Tagilde is signed between Ferdinand I of Portugal and representatives of John of Gaunt of England, marking the beginning of the Anglo-Portuguese Alliance, which remains in effect into the 21st century.
  - 7 August – Hundred Years' War: Poitiers surrenders to the French.
  - 1 December – Hundred Years' War: French take control of Poitou.
  - Hundred Years' War: The French regain control of Brittany from the English.
- 1373
  - 28 April – Hundred Years' War: French re-capture most of Brittany, but are unable to take Brest.
  - 13 May – Anchoress Dame Julian of Norwich receives her sixteen Revelations of Divine Love.
  - 16 June – the Treaty of London between England and Portugal is signed and is the oldest active treaty in the world.
  - August – Hundred Years' War: John of Gaunt, Duke of Lancaster, launches an invasion of France.
  - Bristol is made a county corporate, the first city outside London to be granted this status.
  - Merton College Library is built in Oxford.
- 1374
  - January – Hundred Years' War: John of Gaunt's forces reach Bordeaux.
  - In recognition for his great works, King Edward III grants the writer Geoffrey Chaucer a gallon of wine a day for the rest of his life.
- 1375
  - 4 May – Simon Sudbury enthroned as Archbishop of Canterbury.
  - Hundred Years' War: France and England sign the peace treaty of Bruges, confirming England's rule over Calais, parts of Gascony, and four forts in Brittany.
  - John Mandeville's travel narratives first appear in English.
  - Week-long tournament held, with Alice Perrers leading the opening procession.
- 1376
  - March – Hundred Years' War: the peace treaty between England and France is extended until April 1377.
  - 28 April – start of the Good Parliament in England, so called because its members attempt to reform the corrupt Royal Council, through the first use of impeachment.
  - 7 June – the dying Prince Edward summons his father Edward III and brother John of Gaunt and makes them swear to uphold the claim to the throne of his son Richard.
  - 8 June – Edward the Black Prince dies at the Palace of Westminster, becoming the first English Prince of Wales to not rule as king.
  - 10 July – the Good Parliament is dissolved. At this time, it is the longest Parliament to have sat in England.
  - September – John of Gaunt summons religious reformer John Wycliffe to appear before the Royal Council to defend Gaunt from bishops who have become his enemies.
  - October – John of Gaunt, through the Royal Council, proceeds to undo the work of the Good Parliament.
  - 25 December – John of Gaunt presents his nephew, Prince Richard of Bordeaux, to the feudatories of the realm and swears to uphold Richard's right to succeed Edward III.
- 1377
  - 27 January – the Bad Parliament begins sitting. Influenced by Prince John of Gaunt, it undoes the work done by the Good Parliament, the previous year, to reduce corruption in the Royal Council. It also introduces a poll tax. Thomas Hungerford is the first Parliamentary spokesman to hold the title of Speaker.
  - 20 February – riots in London after John of Gaunt attacks the privileges of the City.
  - 2 March – the Bad Parliament dissolved.
  - 22 May – Pope Gregory XI issues five Bulls condemning the opinion of John Wycliffe that Catholic priests should live in poverty like the twelve disciples of Jesus.
  - 21 June – Edward III dies of a stroke at age 65, ending his 50-year reign.
  - 16 July – coronation of the 10-year-old Richard II, grandson of Edward III. Richard's uncle John of Gaunt and Thomas of Woodstock, 1st Duke of Gloucester rule on his behalf until 1381.
  - Summer – the Great Rumour: peasant unrest in Wiltshire, Surrey and Devon.
  - 13 October – Richard II's first parliament meets.
  - Ongoing – Hundred Years' War: French fleet burns Rye, Hastings, Gravesend and Portsmouth, and raids the Isle of Wight.
- 1378
  - March – John Wycliffe tries to promote his ideas for Catholic reform by laying his theses before parliament and making them public in a tract. He is subsequently summoned before Archbishop of Canterbury, Simon of Sudbury, at Lambeth Palace to defend his actions.
  - July – the English government spy John Lamb assassinates Owain Lawgoch, the Welsh claimant to the title Prince of Wales.
  - 20 October – Western Schism: England recognises the Roman Pope Urban VI over the Avignon Pope Clement VII.
  - Castilian fleet raids Cornwall, burning Fowey.
  - Henry Yevele begins the rebuilding of the nave of Westminster Abbey.
  - Office of Works established within the Royal Household to oversee construction of royal castles and residences; it will continue until 1832.
- 1379
  - 30 June – New College, Oxford, founded by William of Wykeham, Bishop of Winchester (charter 26 November).
  - Foundation of Wisbech Grammar School.
  - Hundred Years' War: French lose control of most of Brittany.

== Births ==
- 1370
  - John Lydgate, Benedictine monk and poet (died 1451).
- 1373
  - Robert Ferrers, 3rd Baron Ferrers of Wemme (died 1396).
  - Edward of Norwich, 2nd Duke of York (died 1415).
- 1374
  - 11 April – Roger Mortimer, 4th Earl of March, heir to the throne (died 1398).
  - Thomas Holland, 1st Duke of Surrey (died 1400).
- 1375
  - Richard of Conisburgh, 3rd Earl of Cambridge (approximate date; died 1414).
- 1376
  - 9 November – Edmund Mortimer, rebel (died 1409).
- 1377
  - Henry Beaufort, Cardinal, Lord Chancellor (died 1447).
- 1378
  - John Hardyng, chronicler (died 1465).
- 1379
  - Joan Beaufort, Countess of Westmorland (approximate date; died 1440).

== Deaths ==
- 1372
  - 8 or 15 January – Walter Manny, 1st Baron Manny, soldier and benefactor (born c. 1310).
  - 11 January – Eleanor of Lancaster, noblewoman (born 1318).
  - 31 August – Ralph Stafford, 1st Earl of Stafford, soldier (born 1301).
- 1373
  - Humphrey de Bohun, 7th Earl of Hereford (born 1342).
- 1374
  - 5 June – William Whittlesey, Archbishop of Canterbury (year of birth unknown).
- 1376
  - 24 January – Richard FitzAlan, 10th Earl of Arundel, military leader (born c. 1313).
  - 8 June – Edward, the Black Prince, son of King Edward III of England (born 1330).
  - 22 July – Simon Langham, Archbishop of Canterbury (born 1310).
- 1377
  - 21 June – King Edward III of England (born 1312).
  - Sir John Minsterworth, soldier and traitor (hanged).
- 1379
  - 10 October – John Twenge, prior of Bridlington, canonized (born 1320).
  - 16 December – John FitzAlan, 1st Baron Arundel (born c. 1348).
