= 1290s in England =

Events from the 1290s in England.

== Incumbents ==
- Monarch – Edward I

== Events ==
1290

- 21 May – the statute of quo warranto establishes the concept of time immemorial in English law, dating it to before the accession of Richard I of England in 1189.
- 8 July – the statute Quia Emptores is passed, reforming the feudal system of land leases and allowing the sale of fee simple estates.
- 18 July – the Edict of Expulsion is issued expelling all the Jews from England (at this time probably around 2,000) by 1 November.
- The second of the Statutes of Mortmain is passed under King Edward I, which prevents land from passing into possession of the church.
- Approximate date of construction of the Round Table at Winchester Castle by order of King Edward.

1291

- 10 May – at Norham Castle, Edward forces the Scottish nobles to recognise his right to determine the succession to the throne of Scotland.
- 8 August – twelve applicants submit their claims to the Scottish throne to Edward I.
- The Eleanor crosses are erected at Charing Cross and across England marking the route of the funeral procession Edward I's Queen, Eleanor of Castile.
- Construction of the nave of York Minster begins.

1292

- 17 November – Edward I places John Balliol on the Scottish throne.
- Edward I reforms and standardises the system of legal education.
- Great Coxwell Barn is built; it will still be standing in the 21st century.

1293

- 13 February – Robert Winchelsey elected as Archbishop of Canterbury, an office he will hold until his death in 1313.
- 15 May – English fleet defeats a French force and sacks La Rochelle.

1294

- January – war breaks out between England and France when Philip IV of France attempts to seize Gascony from English control.
- 14 May – Philip formally announces the confiscation of Gascony.
- June – Edward I takes direct control of the English wool trade (until 1297).
- 24 August – Treaty of Nuremberg: England allies with the Holy Roman Empire against France.
- September – Madog ap Llywelyn leads a Welsh revolt against English rule.
- 9 October – delayed by the Welsh revolt, an English army finally leaves to invade France.
- November – Edward I requires coastal towns to build ships for an expedition to France.
- Edward I demands from the Church a grant of one half of all clerical revenues.

1295

- 5 March – Battle of Maes Moydog: English defeat Welsh rebels.
- 5 July – Scotland and France form the Auld Alliance against England.
- 13 November – Edward I summons the Model Parliament to Westminster, the composition of which serves as a model for later parliaments.

1296

- 30 March – Capture of Berwick: Edward I captures the town of Berwick-upon-Tweed from the Scots and sacks it.
- 27 April – at the Battle of Dunbar, the English defeat the Scots.
- August – Edward takes the Stone of Scone from Scotland to London.
- 28 August – Scottish assembly pays homage to Edward at Berwick. Edward establishes a system of English rule over Scotland.

1297

- 30 January – Edward I outlaws the clergy who have refused to pay his taxes due to an edict of Pope Boniface VIII.
- 24 February – a parliament assembled at Salisbury refuses to endorse Edward's war in Gascony.
- May – William Wallace begins a Scottish rebellion against English rule.
- 24 August – Edward I leaves England to support an invasion of France by the Flemish Count Guy of Dampierre.
- 11 September – at the Battle of Stirling Bridge, the Scots under William Wallace defeat an English army.
- 7 October – a truce is signed between England and France.
- 10 October – Confirmation of Charters: Edward issues a statute reconfirming Magna Carta; copies are to be displayed in every cathedral.

1298

- 22 July – at the Battle of Falkirk, Edward I defeats the Scottish army led by William Wallace.
- Rebuilding of Saint Stephen's Chapel at Westminster begins.

1299

- 4 January – earthquake felt across the home counties.
- 27 June – Pope Boniface VIII issues the papal bull Scimus Fili condemning King Edward I's invasion and occupation of Scotland.
- 4 September – Edward I marries Marguerite, sister of King Philip IV.
- A fire damages the Palace of Westminster.

== Births ==
1292

- Henry Burghersh, statesman (died 1340)
- Eleanor de Clare, noblewoman (died 1337)
- John Grandisson, Bishop of Exeter (died 1369)

1293

- Margaret de Clare, noblewoman (died 1342)

1295

- 16 September – Elizabeth de Clare, noblewoman (died 1360)
- Reginald de Cobham, 1st Baron Cobham (died 1361)

1297

- Thomas Wake, 2nd Baron Wake of Liddell (died 1349)

== Deaths ==
1290

- 28 November – Eleanor of Castile, queen of Edward I of England (born 1241)

1291

- 26 June – Eleanor of Provence, queen of Henry III of England (born c. 1223)

1292

- June? – Roger Bacon, philosopher and scientist (born c. 1220?)
- 25 October – Robert Burnell, bishop and Lord Chancellor (born c. 1239)
- 8 December – John Peckham, Archbishop of Canterbury (born c. 1230)

1295

- 7 December – Gilbert de Clare, 6th Earl of Hertford, politician (born 1243)

1296

- May – William de Valence, 1st Earl of Pembroke (year of birth unknown)
- 5 June – Edmund Crouchback, 1st Earl of Lancaster, son of Henry III of England (born 1245)

1297

- 11 September – Hugh de Cressingham, treasurer (year of birth unknown)
- 31 December – Humphrey de Bohun, 3rd Earl of Hereford, soldier (born 1249)

1298

- 24 January – William the Hardy, Lord of Douglas (born 1243 in Scotland)
