= 1240s in England =

Events from the 1240s in England.

== Incumbents ==
- Monarch – Henry III

== Events ==
- 1240
  - Dafydd ap Llywelyn, Prince of Wales, pays homage to King Henry III and agrees to arbitration over the right to rule Wales.
  - Old St Paul's Cathedral in London is consecrated.
  - First perambulation of Dartmoor.
- 1241
  - 1 February – Boniface of Savoy, the Queen's uncle, is enthroned as Archbishop of Canterbury.
  - 10 August – Eleanor, Fair Maid of Brittany dies captive at Bristol, ending the senior line of Geoffrey II, Duke of Brittany.
  - October – After defeat in a military campaign, Dafydd ap Llywelyn makes Henry his heir.
- 1242
  - May – English army supports rebels in Poitou against French rule.
  - 12 May – Assize of Arms: A royal ordnance requires appointment of constables to summon men to arms, quell breaches of the peace, and to deliver offenders to the sheriff.
  - Royal troops seize the island of Lundy, occupied by the fugitive William de Marisco.
- 1243
  - September – England signs a truce with France.
- 1244
  - Dafydd ap Llywelyn forms alliance of minor Welsh rulers in Wales and begins revolt against English rule.
  - August – Henry blockades Scotland and musters an army at Newcastle upon Tyne after Scots threaten the border.
  - November – Bishops and barons refuse to pay taxes demanded by King Henry, and insist on administrative reforms.
- 1245
  - English army campaigns in north Wales to subdue Dafydd ap Llywelyn. A truce is agreed in the autumn, and Henry returns to England.
  - Crutched Friars established in England.
  - The rebuilding of Westminster Abbey in Gothic style begins.
- 1246
  - Cistercians, together with the King's brother, Richard, 1st Earl of Cornwall, found Hailes Abbey in Gloucestershire.
  - Dafydd ap Llywelyn, who had lately claimed the title of prince of Wales, dies and the resistance of the Welsh against English forces in Wales collapses.
- 1247
  - April – Treaty of Woodstock: Dafydd ap Llywelyn's successors, the Welsh princes Llywelyn ap Gruffudd and Owain ap Gruffudd acknowledge Henry as their overlord.
  - 13 June – Coinage reform introduces a new silver coin and establishes seventeen local mints.
  - Romford established as a market town.
  - The Bethlem Royal Hospital founded in London.
- 1248
  - 11 March – Richard of Cornwall presides at the first Trial of the Pyx to determine the purity of coinage.
  - Simon de Montfort, 6th Earl of Leicester appointed as governor of Gascony, but soon proves unpopular.
- 1249
  - Spring – Bequest of William of Durham for the support of scholars in the University of Oxford, considered as the establishment of University College there.

== Births ==
- 1240
  - 29 September – Margaret of England, daughter of Henry III of England and consort of Alexander III of Scotland (died 1275)
- 1241
  - Eleanor of Castile, queen of Edward I of England (died 1290)
- 1243
  - 2 September – Gilbert de Clare, 6th Earl of Hertford, politician (died 1295)
- 1245
  - 16 January – Edmund Crouchback, 1st Earl of Lancaster, son of Henry III of England (died 1296)
- 1246
  - 14 September – John FitzAlan, 7th Earl of Arundel (died 1272)
- 1247
  - Little Saint Hugh of Lincoln (died 1255)
- 1249
  - Humphrey de Bohun, 3rd Earl of Hereford (died 1297)

== Deaths ==
- 1240
  - 27 May – William de Warenne, 5th Earl of Surrey (born 1166)
  - 16 November – Edmund of Abingdon, Archbishop of Canterbury, sanctified, dies in France on pilgrimage (born 1175)
- 1241
  - 10 August – Eleanor, Fair Maid of Brittany, daughter of Geoffrey II, Duke of Brittany (born 1184)
  - 1 December – Isabella of England, princess (born 1214)
- 1242
  - 26 March – William de Forz, 3rd Earl of Albemarle (year of birth unknown)
- 1243
  - 12 May – Hubert de Burgh, 1st Earl of Kent (born c. 1165)
- 1245
  - c. June – Elias of Dereham, canon and building designer
  - 21 August – Alexander of Hales, theologian
- 1246
  - 31 May – Isabella of Angoulême, queen of John of England (born c. 1187)
  - June – Richard Fitz Roy, illegitimate son of King John (born c. 1190)
  - Thomas De Melsonby, last hermit of the Farne Islands
- 1247
  - William de Ferrers, 4th Earl of Derby (born c. 1168)
