= 1130s in England =

Events from the 1130s in England.

== Incumbents ==
- Monarch – Henry I (to 1 December 1135), then Stephen

== Events ==
- 1130
  - New choir of Canterbury Cathedral completed.
- 1131
  - 8 September – the barons swear allegiance to Matilda, now countess of Anjou, as the true heir of her father, Henry I of England.
  - Cistercians found Rievaulx Abbey in Yorkshire.
  - Gilbertine Order of nuns founded by Gilbert of Sempringham in Lincolnshire, the only completely English religious order.
- 1132
  - Benedictines found Fountains Abbey in Yorkshire.
- 1133
  - August – King Henry I leaves England for the last time for Normandy.
  - A royal charter establishes the first annual Bartholomew Fair at Smithfield, London; later to become England's largest cloth fair.
  - First Bishop of Carlisle (Æthelwold) consecrated.
  - Rebuilt Exeter Cathedral consecrated.
- 1135
  - 26 May – the Great Fire of 1135 destroys the wooden London Bridge and seriously damages St Paul's Cathedral.
  - 1 December – King Henry I dies (at Lyons-la-Forêt in Normandy) having nominated Matilda as his heir.
  - 22 December – Stephen of Blois, nephew of Henry I, claims the throne.
  - 26 December – coronation of Stephen of England at Westminster Abbey by William de Corbeil, Archbishop of Canterbury.
  - Bruton Abbey, Buildwas Abbey and Byland Abbey founded, the latter in January by the Congregation of Savigny.
- 1136
  - 1 January – revolt in Wales; Welsh capture Swansea and Cardigan from the Normans.
  - 4 January – Henry I is buried in his foundation, Reading Abbey (tomb dedicated 1 December).
  - 5 February – by the Treaty of Durham, Stephen concedes Cumberland to David I of Scotland.
  - Hospital of St Cross, an almshouse in Winchester, is established by Bishop Henry of Blois; it will still be functioning in the 21st century.
  - Geoffrey of Monmouth writes Historia Regum Britanniae.
- 1137
  - March – Stephen fails in his attempt to re-capture Normandy from Matilda.
  - 3 June – a fire severely damages Rochester Cathedral, but it is soon rebuilt.
  - 4 June – a fire destroys much of the city of York, including 39 churches and York Minster, but the latter is soon rebuilt.
  - 27 June – a fire severely damages the city of Bath, Somerset.
- 1138
  - January–February – King David I of Scotland raids Northumberland, taking the Bishop of Durham's Norham Castle (garrisoned only by nine), and besieges the castle at Wark on Tweed.
  - 10 April – Robert Warelwast is nominated as Bishop of Exeter.
  - May – The Anarchy: Robert, 1st Earl of Gloucester, leads a rebellion against King Stephen in favour of his half-sister Matilda.
  - 10 June – Battle of Clitheroe: Having harried Craven in Yorkshire, David I of Scotland's nephew William fitz Duncan meets and defeats an English force on the edge of the Bowland Fells.
  - 22 August – Battle of the Standard: English army defeats that of David I of Scotland at Cowton Moor near Northallerton in Yorkshire.
  - December – Legatine conference in Westminster led by Alberic of Ostia.
  - Alcester Abbey and Bourne Abbey established.
- 1139
  - 8 January – Theobald of Bec enthroned as Archbishop of Canterbury.
  - 9 April – the second Treaty of Durham between King Stephen of England and David I of Scotland; David's son Earl Henry takes control of most of Northumberland, excluding Bamburgh and Newcastle upon Tyne.
  - June – Stephen orders the arrest of Roger of Salisbury, Justiciar and Bishop of Salisbury, and Alexander of Lincoln, Bishop of Lincoln.
  - 30 September – The Anarchy: Empress Matilda lands near Arundel to begin her campaign to regain the throne from Stephen.
  - 7 November – The Anarchy: Gloucester's army sacks Worcester.
  - King's School, Pontefract, founded.

== Births ==
- 1130
  - Richard de Clare, 2nd Earl of Pembroke (died 1176)
- 1133
  - 5 March – King Henry II of England (died 1189)
- 1136
  - William of Newburgh, historian (died c. 1198)

== Deaths ==
- year unknown, after 1130
  - Robert of Bellême, 3rd Earl of Shrewsbury (born 1052)
- 1130
  - Maud, Countess of Huntingdon (born 1074)
- 1134
  - 28 March – Stephen Harding, Abbot of Cîteaux and saint (born c. 1050)
  - Biddenden Maids, supposed earliest known conjoined twins (born 1100)
- 1135
  - 1 December – King Henry I of England (born c. 1068)
- 1136
  - 15 April – Richard de Clare, 1st Earl of Hertford (born 1094)
  - 21 November – William de Corbeil, Archbishop of Canterbury (born c. 1070 in the Île-de-France)
- 1137
  - 10 July – Pain fitzJohn, nobleman and royal administrator (killed in ambush)
  - c. 26 September – William Warelwast, Bishop of Exeter and diplomat
- 1138
  - 11 May – William de Warenne, 2nd Earl of Surrey
- 1139
  - 11 December – Roger of Salisbury, bishop and Lord Chancellor
