= 1150s in England =

Events from the 1150s in England.

== Incumbents ==
- Monarch – Stephen (to 25 October 1154), then Henry II

== Events ==
- 1150
  - Henry, son of Empress Matilda, becomes Duke of Normandy.
  - The Anarchy: Worcester sacked.
- 1151
  - Henry pays homage to Louis VII of France, and cedes Vexin to France.
  - King Eystein II of Norway takes advantage of the troubles of The Anarchy to plunder England's east coast.
- 1152
  - 18 May – Henry marries Eleanor of Aquitaine, and claims rule over Aquitaine.
  - The Anarchy: King Stephen besieges the last opposition stronghold, at Wallingford.
  - The Anarchy: Roger de Berkeley is dispossessed of Berkeley Castle in Gloucestershire for withholding his allegiance from the Plantagenets and the Lordship of Berkeley is granted to Robert Fitzharding, founder of the Berkeley family which will still hold the castle in the 21st century.
- 1153
  - January – The Anarchy: Henry, Count of Anjou, arrives in England in a campaign against King Stephen in favour of his mother Empress Matilda.
  - 17 August – The Anarchy: Following the sudden death of Eustace IV, Count of Boulogne, Stephen's eldest son and heir apparent, at Bury St Edmunds, Theobald of Bec, Archbishop of Canterbury, mediates between Stephen and Henry.
  - 7 November – The Anarchy: Henry and Stephen seal the Treaty of Wallingford in Winchester Cathedral, ending the civil war.
- 1154
  - 25 October – King Stephen dies after a short illness at Dover Priory and is succeeded by Henry II, the first Plantagenet king of England.
  - 4 December – Pope Adrian IV elected, the only English Pope.
  - 19 December – coronation of Henry II and Eleanor of Aquitaine at Westminster Abbey.
  - Huntingdonshire is declared royal forest.
  - The Anglo-Saxon Chronicle completed.
  - Henry of Huntingdon completes his Historia Anglorum.
- 1155
  - January – Henry II appoints Thomas Becket as Lord Chancellor.
  - Henry defeats rebellious barons, reclaims many royal castles and abolishes the Earldoms of York and Hereford.
  - Pope Adrian IV issues the papal bull Laudabiliter giving Henry II lordship over Ireland.
  - Wace's Roman de Brut, an Anglo-Norman language semi-legendary history of Britain in verse, is completed.
- 1156
  - 5 February – Henry pays homage to Louis VII of France to secure his titles over Normandy, Aquitaine and Anjou.
  - Henry suppresses a revolt by his brother Geoffrey in Anjou, and grants him the title Count of Nantes in return for securing peace.
- 1157
  - May – Henry II demands the return of Northumberland, Cumberland and Westmorland from Malcolm IV of Scotland; in return Malcolm is given the title Earl of Huntingdon.
  - July – Henry II launches a campaign against Owain Gwynedd in north Wales. Although Owain defeats him at the Battle of Ewloe he eventually submits to Henry and pays homage.
  - Henry II grants special trading privileges to the Hansa merchants of Cologne in London who lend him money at interest.
  - Approximate date – Henry grants a charter to the merchants of Lincoln.
- 1158
  - Summer – Henry II leaves for Normandy; he does not return to England until 1163.
  - August – Henry agrees a treaty with Louis VII of France: Henry's son Henry the Young King to marry Louis' newborn daughter Marguerite in return for control of parts of Vexin.
  - Conan IV, Duke of Brittany, pays homage to Henry II.
- 1159
  - Henry besieges Toulouse to claim it as part of Aquitaine, but is forced to abandon the campaign.
  - John of Salisbury completes his works Metalogicon and Polycraticus.
  - Approximate date – churchman Richard FitzNeal is appointed Lord High Treasurer in charge of the royal Exchequer, an office he will hold for almost 40 years.

== Births ==
- 1150s – Nicolaa de la Haye, noblewoman and castellan (died 1230)
- 1150
  - Rosamund Clifford, mistress of Henry II of England (approximate date; died 1176)
  - Stephen Langton, Archbishop of Canterbury (approximate date; died 1228)
- 1152
  - Geoffrey, Archbishop of York, illegitimate son of Henry II of England (approximate date; died 1212)
- 1153
  - Richard de Clare, 4th Earl of Hertford (approximate date; died 1217)
- 1155
  - 28 February – Henry the Young King, son of Henry II of England (died 1183)
- 1157
  - 8 September – King Richard I of England (died 1199)

== Deaths ==
- 1151
  - 23 April – Adeliza of Louvain, queen consort of Henry I of England (born 1103)
- 1152
  - 3 May – Matilda of Boulogne, sovereign Countess of Boulogne and queen consort of Stephen, King of England (born 1105)
- 1153
  - 17 August – Eustace IV, Count of Boulogne, son of Stephen, King of England (born c. 1130)
  - 16 December – Ranulph de Gernon, 2nd Earl of Chester (born c. 1100)
  - Gilbert de Clare, 1st Earl of Hertford (born 1115)
- 1154
  - 20 February – Wulfric of Haselbury, anchorite, canonized (born c. 1080)
  - 25 October – Stephen, King of England (born 1096)
- 1159
  - 1 September – Pope Adrian IV (born c. 1100)
  - 11 October – William I, Count of Boulogne (William of Blois), Earl of Surrey, son of Stephen, King of England (born c. 1137)
