= 1070s in England =

Events from the 1070s in England.

== Incumbents ==
- Monarch – William I

== Events ==
- 1070
  - Winter of 1069–1070 – Harrying of the North: King William I quells rebellions in the North of England following an invasion by King Sweyn II of Denmark. Widespread famine follows the devastation wrought.
  - Spring – Sweyn II of Denmark joins English rebels led by Hereward the Wake and captures the Isle of Ely in The Fens of East Anglia.
  - 11 April – Archbishop of Canterbury Stigand is deposed at the Council of Winchester and imprisoned.
  - 1 June – Hereward plunders Peterborough Abbey.
  - June – Denmark signs a treaty with England; Sweyn and his forces leave the country.
  - 15 August – Pavian-born Benedictine Lanfranc is appointed as the new Archbishop of Canterbury.
  - Invasion of England by Malcolm III of Scotland repelled.
  - Hugh d'Avranches, Earl of Chester, the first Marcher Lord, invades Wales, capturing parts of Gwynedd.
  - Osmund succeeds Herfast as Lord Chancellor; Herfast becomes Bishop of Elmham.
  - Rebuilding of Canterbury Cathedral following a fire begins.
  - Rebuilding of York Minster begins.
  - Construction of Dudley Castle in the west midlands by Ansculf de Picquigny begins.
  - Construction of Richmond Castle in North Yorkshire by Alan Rufus begins.
  - Jews from Rouen, in Normandy, settle in England at the invitation of the King.
- 1071
  - William defeats Hereward the Wake's rebellion on the Isle of Ely.
  - Edwin, Earl of Mercia, again rebels against William but is betrayed and killed, leading to the redistribution of land within Mercia to William's subjects.
- 1072
  - 27 May – the Accord of Winchester establishes the primacy of the Archbishop of Canterbury over the Archbishop of York in the Church of England.
  - August – William invades Scotland, reaching the River Tay.
  - At Abernethy, King Malcolm III of Scotland submits to William.
  - Remigius de Fécamp moves the seat of his diocese from Dorchester on Thames to Lincoln, becoming first Bishop of Lincoln, and construction of Lincoln Cathedral begins.
- 1073
  - Rebuilding of St Augustine's Abbey in Canterbury.
- 1074
  - Roger de Montgomerie is created Earl of Shrewsbury, and invades Wales, reaching as far as Powys.
- 1075
  - Revolt of the Earls: three earls rebel against William in the last serious act of resistance to the Norman conquest of England.
  - August (approx. date) – Council of London reforms Church administration in England. It approves union of the dioceses of Ramsbury and Sherborne into a new Diocese of Salisbury with a new cathedral at Old Sarum, Herman becoming first Bishop of Salisbury.
  - First Bishop of Chichester (Stigand of Selsey) consecrated.
- 1076
  - April – Council of Winchester confirms ecclesiastical authority, insists on celibacy of the clergy and marriage within church.
  - 31 May – execution of Waltheof II, Earl of Northumbria, for his part in the Revolt of the Earls.
  - Approximate date of the Trial of Penenden Heath to settle a land dispute between King William and his half-brother Odo of Bayeux.
- 1077
  - The Bayeux Tapestry completed depicting the Norman conquest of England.
  - William's son Robert Curthose stages an insurrection against him in Normandy.
  - Construction of St Albans Cathedral begins under Abbot Paul of Caen.
  - Foundation of the first Cluniac abbey in England, at Lewes.
  - First recorded Trial by combat in England.
- 1078
  - 3 June (approx. date) – consecration of Osmund as Bishop of Salisbury. He will introduce the Sarum Rite.
  - (approx. date) – construction of the White Tower (Tower of London) begins under the direction of Bishop Gundulf of Rochester.
  - Construction of Colchester Castle begins under the direction of Bishop Gundulf of Rochester.
- 1079
  - January – Robert unhorses William in battle in Normandy.
  - William creates the New Forest as a hunting ground.
  - Rebuilding of Winchester Cathedral begins under the direction of Bishop Walkelin of Winchester.

== Births ==
- 1075
  - 16 April – Orderic Vitalis, Benedictine chronicler (died c. 1142)
  - Approximate date – Gerald de Windsor, noble (died 1135)

== Deaths ==
- 1072
  - 10–11 February – Leofric, first Bishop of Exeter
  - c. 21–22 February – Stigand, deposed Archbishop of Canterbury
- 1075
  - 19 December – Edith of Wessex, queen of Edward the Confessor (born c. 1029)
- 1076
  - 31 May – Waltheof II, Earl of Northumbria, last of the Anglo-Saxon earls (born 1050)
