= 1350s in England =

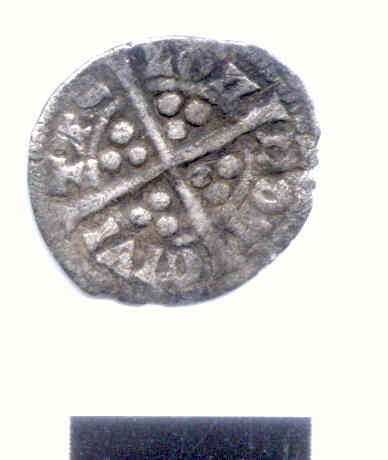
A silver farthing of Edward. London mint, ca. 1351-1361

Events from the 1350s in England.

== Incumbents ==
- Monarch – Edward III

== Events ==
- 1350
  - 29 August – Battle of Winchelsea (Les Espagnols sur Mer) off the south coast of England: An English fleet personally commanded by King Edward III defeats a Castilian fleet.
  - 26 October – Sir William de Thorpe, Chief Justice of the King's Bench, is imprisoned for taking bribes.
  - "Gough Map" of England produced; the first to accurately plot distances and show the true shape of the country.
- 1351
  - 14 January – Parliament passes the Treason Act, codifying and curtailing the offence.
  - February
    - Statute of Labourers enacted to fix labour costs at 1346 levels due to the increases caused by the Black Death.
    - Statute of Provisors prevents the Pope from appointing clergy to English benefices.
  - 26 March – Combat of the Thirty: thirty picked knights each from the Kingdoms of France and England fight in Brittany to determine who will rule the Duchy of Brittany as part of the War of the Breton Succession; a Franco-Breton victory is secured.
  - 8 April – Hundred Years' War: At the Battle of Taillebourg in Gascony, the French are defeated by the English.
- 1352
  - August – Hundred Years' War: English forces heavily defeat the French at the Battle of Mauron in Brittany.
  - 7 November – Corpus Christi College founded as a College of the University of Cambridge by the Guilds of Corpus Christi and the Blessed Virgin Mary.
- 1353
  - The first statute of praemunire prevents English subjects appealing to foreign courts, especially the Roman Curia.
  - Hundred Years' War: Peace negotiations with France.
- 1354
  - April – resumption of the Hundred Years' War between France and England.
  - Scottish army captures Berwick-upon-Tweed.
  - The Statute of the Staple is enacted, protecting the wool trade.
  - The Liberty of Subject statute makes it illegal for anyone to be executed or deprived of their real property without being given the opportunity to answer their accusers in court.
- 1355
  - 10 February – St Scholastica Day riot in Oxford breaks out leaving 63 scholars and perhaps 30 locals dead in two days.
  - August – Battle of Nesbit Moor: Scottish army decisively defeats the English.
  - 5 October–2 December – Hundred Years' War: Black Prince's chevauchée of 1355 – A large mounted Anglo-Gascon force under the command of Edward the Black Prince marches from Bordeaux in English-held Gascony 300 miles (480 km) south to Narbonne and back, devastating a wide swathe of French territory.
- 1356
  - 20 January – Edward Balliol surrenders title as King of Scotland to Edward III of England.
  - 19 September – Hundred Years' War: at the Battle of Poitiers, the English, commanded by the Black Prince, defeat the French and capture King John II of France in the process.
- 1357
  - 22 March – Hundred Years' War: a two-year truce is declared at Bordeaux between France and England.
  - 6 November – King David II of Scotland ransomed back to Scotland.
  - Humber estuary port of Ravenser Odd abandoned following flooding.
- 1358
  - April – "Round Table" tournament held at Windsor Castle, attracting contestants from across Europe.
  - Hundred Years' War: The captive French King John II agrees to restore much of the Angevin lands to England, but this is rejected by his son Dauphin Charles.
- 1359
  - 24 March – Hundred Years' War: Second Treaty of London signed between England and France, but rejected by the French States-General on 25 May.
  - 4 December – Edward III lays siege to Rouen in France.
  - December – Hundred Years' War: English blockade Rheims.

== Births ==
- 1350
  - 25 November (approx.) – Katherine Swynford, mistress of John of Gaunt (died 1403)
  - Thomas Holland, 2nd Earl of Kent, half-brother to Richard II (died 1397)
  - Approximate date
    - William Gascoigne, Chief Justice of England (died 1419)
    - John Montacute, 3rd Earl of Salisbury (murdered 1400)
    - Sir John Stanley, first King of Mann (died 1414)
    - William Scrope, 1st Earl of Wiltshire (died 1399)
- 1352
  - Approximate date – John Holland, 1st Duke of Exeter, half-brother to Richard II (executed 1400)
- 1353
  - Thomas Arundel, Archbishop of Canterbury (died 1414)
- 1354
  - Roger Scales, 4th Baron Scales (died 1387)
  - Approximate date
    - Thomas Morley, 4th Baron Morley (died 1416)
    - John Purvey, scholar and Bible translator (died 1428)
- 1355
  - 7 January – Thomas of Woodstock, Duke of Gloucester, son of Edward III (murdered 1397)
  - 16 August – Philippa of Eltham, princess, Countess of Ulster (died 1382)
- 1359
  - John Dinham, knight of violent reputation (died 1428)

== Deaths ==
- 1352
  - Probable date
    - Laurence Minot, poet (born 1300)
    - William Ros, 3rd Baron Ros (born 1325)
- 1353
  - 6 March – Roger Grey, 1st Baron Grey of Ruthin, soldier and knight of the shire (born c. 1298)
- 1355
  - 22 April – Eleanor of Woodstock, countess regent of Guelders, eldest daughter of King Edward II (born 1318)
- 1358
  - 22 August – Isabella of France, queen of Edward II (born 1295)
