= 1180s in England =

Events from the 1180s in England.

== Incumbents ==
- Monarch – Henry II (to 6 July 1189), then Richard I

== Events ==
- 1180
  - September – King Henry II renews the Pact of Ivry with the newly crowned King Philip II of France.
  - Construction of Wells Cathedral begins.
  - Ranulf de Glanvill writes the first known treatise on English law.
  - Coinage reform: new silver coins minted.
  - Approximate completion date of synagogues at Jew's Court, Lincoln, and in Guildford.
- 1181
  - December – Baldwin of Exeter enthroned as Archbishop of Canterbury.
  - A dispute arises between Henry II's sons Richard and Henry the Young King over lands in Aquitaine.
  - Assize of Arms enacts military reform.
- 1182
  - Henry the Young King leads a rebellion against his father in Aquitaine.
- 1183
  - February – Geoffrey of Brittany allies with Henry the Young King against Henry II and Richard.
  - 11 June – Henry the Young King dies, ending the fighting in Aquitaine.
  - The Boldon Book is compiled as a survey of the bishopric of Durham.
- 1184
  - May – a serious fire damages Glastonbury Abbey and destroys several buildings.
  - King Henry II encourages his youngest (and favorite) son John to seize Aquitaine from his brother Richard.
  - The first royal ordinance demanding that the Knights Templar and Hospitaller assist in the collection of taxes is promulgated.
  - Assize of the Forest codifies laws protecting royal forests.
  - Gerald of Wales writes Topographica Hibernica.
- 1185
  - 29 January – Henry declines an offer to become King of Jerusalem.
  - 10 February – Knights Templar consecrate Temple Church in London.
  - 11 April – the 1185 East Midlands earthquake destroys Lincoln Cathedral.
  - 25 April – John's first expedition to Ireland: King Henry II knights his son and heir, the 18-year-old Prince John, newly created Lord of Ireland, and sends him to Ireland, accompanied by 300 knights and a team of administrators to enforce English control. Landing at Waterford, he treats the local Irish rulers with contempt, making fun of their unfashionable long beards. Also failing to make allies amongst the Anglo-Norman settlers, the English army is unable to subdue the Irish fighters in unfamiliar conditions and the expedition soon becomes a complete disaster. In December, John returns to England in defeat. Nonetheless, Henry gets him named 'King of Ireland' by Pope Urban III and procures a golden crown with peacock feathers. The expedition is accompanied and chronicled by Gerald of Wales.
- 1186
  - Henry restores Edinburgh to William I of Scotland.
  - July – after the death of Geoffrey of Brittany, King Philip II of France claims rule over Brittany.
- 1187
  - May – Philip II invades Aquitaine, but makes a truce and agrees to crusade against Saladin with Henry II and Richard instead.
- 1188
  - Henry II imposes the Saladin tithe to pay for the planned crusade.
  - 11 November – Henry refuses to name Richard as his heir. Richard pays homage to King Philip II.
  - Gerald of Wales begins writing Itinerarium Cambriae.
  - The chronicle Flores Historiarum commences.
- 1189
  - May – Richard campaigns against his father Henry II in France.
  - 4 July – Henry II surrenders, agrees to make Richard his heir and pay an indemnity.
  - 6 July – Henry II dies at the Château de Chinon; Richard becomes king. Eleanor of Aquitaine is released from house arrest and rules as de facto regent for her son. Retrospectively (from the 13th century), the time before this in law becomes time immemorial.
  - 13 August – Richard sails from Barfleur to Portsmouth to take up his crown.
  - August – William Marshal marries the 17-year-old Isabel de Clare (daughter of Richard de Clare). Through this marriage, he becomes 1st Earl of Pembroke, acquiring huge estates in England, Normandy, Wales and Ireland.
  - 3 September – coronation of Richard I at Westminster Abbey. Massacre of the Jews in London.
  - 12 December – Richard I embarks on the Third Crusade, appointing Hugh de Puiset and William Longchamp as justiciars in his absence and securing the allegiance of his brother John by approving his marriage to their cousin Isabella of Gloucester.

== Births ==
- 1180
  - Gilbert de Clare, 4th Earl of Hertford, 5th Earl of Gloucester, soldier (died 1230)
- c. 1182
  - Hugh Bigod, 3rd Earl of Norfolk (died 1225)

== Deaths ==
- 1180
  - 25 October – John of Salisbury, bishop of Chartres and scholar (born c. 1120)
- 1181
  - 30 June – Hugh de Kevelioc, 3rd Earl of Chester, politician (born 1147)
- 1183
  - 11 June – Henry the Young King, son of Henry II (born 1155)
  - 23 November – William Fitz Robert, 2nd Earl of Gloucester (born 1116)
- 1184
  - 16 February – Richard of Dover, Archbishop of Canterbury (year of birth unknown)
- 1186
  - 19 August – Geoffrey II, Duke of Brittany, son of Henry II (born 1158)
  - Aaron of Lincoln, Jewish financier (born c. 1125)
- 1187
  - 18 February – Gilbert Foliot, Bishop of London (born c. 1110)
- 1189
  - 6 July – King Henry II (born 1133)
  - 13 July – Matilda, Duchess of Saxony, daughter of Henry II (born 1156)
  - 20 or 21 August – Geoffrey Ridel, Bishop of Ely and former Lord Chancellor (year of birth unknown)
  - 14 November – William de Mandeville, 3rd Earl of Essex, Chief Justiciar (year of birth unknown)
