= 1060s in England =

Events from the 1060s in England.

== Incumbents ==
- Monarch – Edward the Confessor (to 5 January 1066), Harold II (5 January to 14 October 1066), Edgar Ætheling (14 October to 10 December 1066), then William I

== Events ==
- 1060
  - Dedication of Waltham Abbey.
  - Rebuilding of Westminster Abbey substantially completed.
- 1061
  - Edward the Confessor sends an embassy to Rome.
  - King Malcolm III of Scotland raids Northumbria.
- 1062
  - Edwin becomes Earl of Mercia.
  - Saint Wulfstan consecrated as Bishop of Worcester.
  - Harold Godwinson, Earl of Wessex, launches an invasion of Wales, raiding Rhuddlan.
- 1063
  - Harold captures Gwynedd.
  - Welsh prince Gruffydd ap Llywelyn killed by his own men; English receive tribute from northern Wales, although the south remains independent.
- 1064
  - Possible date – Harold Godwinson marries Ealdgyth, daughter of the late Ælfgar, Earl of Mercia, and widow of Welsh ruler Gruffydd ap Llywelyn.
  - Harold Godwinson is shipwrecked at Ponthieu, Normandy, and taken captive by Count Guy.
  - Harold pays homage to William, Duke of Normandy and helps him in an invasion of Brittany.
- 1065
  - 3 October – Northumbrian rebels capture York, outlaw Harold's brother, Tostig Godwinson, and choose Morcar of Northumbria as their new earl.
  - 28 December – Westminster Abbey consecrated.
  - Wilton Abbey consecrated.
- 1066
  - 5 January – King Edward the Confessor dies.
  - 6 January
    - Edward the Confessor buried in Westminster Abbey.
    - Harold Godwinson chosen by the Witenagemot to be king over Edward's nephew, Edgar Ætheling, who is aged only around 15. Harold is crowned this day, probably in Westminster Abbey. At about this time (if not earlier) Harold is married to Ealdgyth, daughter of the late Ælfgar, Earl of Mercia, and widow of Welsh ruler Gruffydd ap Llywelyn.
  - May – Tostig Godwinson, Harold's brother, attempts to invade England, landing on the Isle of Wight and in Kent, but is forced to return to Scotland.

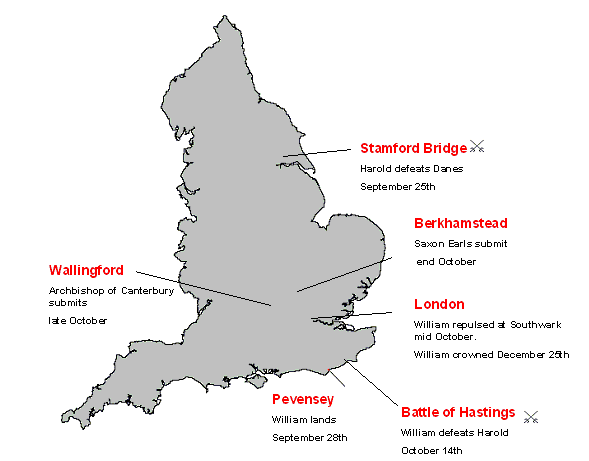

  - 20 September – Battle of Fulford: Harald III of Norway, accompanied by Tostig Godwinson, invades England and defeats the English forces led by Morcar of Northumbria and Edwin, Earl of Mercia, in Yorkshire.
  - 25 September – Battle of Stamford Bridge: King Harold II of England defeats and kills both Harald III of Norway and Tostig.
  - 28 September – William, Duke of Normandy ("William the Conqueror") lands an invasion force near Pevensey. King Harold marches south to meet him.
  - 14 October
    - Battle of Hastings: William's forces defeat and kill Harold, probably at Senlac Hill, in East Sussex.
    - Edgar Ætheling proclaimed King by a Witenagemot in London but submits to William some weeks later at Berkhamsted.
  - Late October or early December – Stigand, Archbishop of Canterbury, submits to William at Wallingford.
  - 25 December – Coronation of William I of England in Westminster Abbey.
- 1067
  - February – Copsi is appointed by the king as Earl of Northumbria (Bernicia).
  - 12 March – Copsi is killed at Newburn by Oswulf II of Bamburgh who succeeds him.
  - September – Oswulf is killed by an outlaw he is pursuing. Gospatric pays the king to succeed as Earl of Northumbria.
  - December – William suppresses a revolt in Exeter and begins construction of Rougemont Castle there.
  - Edgar Ætheling flees to Scotland with his family.
  - Construction of Winchester Castle.
- 1068
  - Morcar leads a revolt in Northumbria, but William defeats the rebels at York.
  - William orders the construction of new castles at Warwick, Nottingham, Lincoln, Huntingdon, Cambridge and York.
- 1069
  - 28 January – Northumbrians kill the new Norman earl of Northumbria, Robert de Comines, at Durham and attack York.
  - King Sweyn II of Denmark lands a fleet in the Humber in support of the Northumbrian rebels and they join him to burn York, attacking its two castles and destroying the old Minster.
  - At Stafford, William swiftly defeats a rebellion led by Edwin, Earl of Mercia.
  - Winter of 1069–1070 – Harrying of the North: William quells rebellions against his rule, campaigning through the north of England with his forces, burning houses, crops, cattle and land from York to Durham, resulting in the deaths of over 100,000 people, mainly from starvation and winter cold.

== Births ==
- 1064
  - Robert Fitz Richard, landowner (died 1136)
- 1068
  - Henry I of England (died 1135)

== Deaths ==
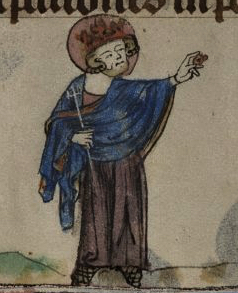
Edward the Confessor

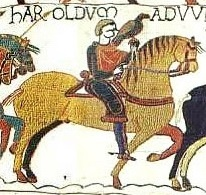
Harold Godwinson

- 1062
  - Approximate date – Ælfgar, Earl of Mercia
- 1066
  - 5 January – King Edward the Confessor (born c. 1004)
  - 25 September (at the Battle of Stamford Bridge) – Tostig Godwinson, Earl of Northumbria (born c. 1026)
  - 14 October (at the Battle of Hastings)
    - Harold Godwinson (King Harold II) (born c. 1022)
    - Leofwine Godwinson, brother of King Harold (born c. 1035)
    - Gyrth Godwinson, brother of King Harold (born c. 1032)
- 1067
  - Possible date – Lady Godiva (Godgifu), noblewoman, landowner and benefactress (born by c. 1010)
- 1069
  - 11 September – Ealdred, Archbishop of York
