= 1280s in England =

Events from the 1280s in England.

== Incumbents ==
- Monarch – Edward I

== Events ==
- 1280
  - University College, Oxford receives statutes.
- 1281
  - Establishment of Rewley Abbey, Oxford, and Appleby Friary.
  - The Council of Lambeth issues the decree Ignorantia sacerdotum lays down the duties of parish priests to teach the laity in religious matters.
- 1282
  - 21 March – Dafydd ap Gruffydd leads rebellion in Wales.
  - 11 December – the English defeat the Welsh at the Battle of Orewin Bridge.
  - First Trial of the Pyx, a procedure for measuring the standard of minted coins, held.
- 1283
  - 25 April – the last independent Welsh stronghold, Castell y Bere, falls to the English.
  - 28 June – a parliament of England summoned to assemble at Shrewsbury Abbey to decide the fate of the captured Dafydd ap Gruffydd is the first to include commoners.
  - 3 October – the last ruler of an independent Wales, Prince Dafydd ap Gruffydd, is executed in Shrewsbury, the first prominent person in history to be hanged, drawn and quartered (for the newly created crime of high treason).
  - 5 November – an official of Exeter Cathedral, Walter Lechlade, is murdered in its close in a conspiracy ordered by the Dean, John Pycot, and the city's mayor, Alured de Porta.
- 1284
  - 3 March – the Statute of Rhuddlan extends English law to Wales.
  - The first "Round Table" tournament held, at Nefyn in north Wales.
  - Peterhouse, the oldest collegiate foundation of the University of Cambridge, is established by Hugh de Balsham, Bishop of Ely.
- 1285
  - The writ of Circumspecte Agatis establishes which issues may be tried in ecclesiastical courts.
  - Easter – enactment of the second Statute of Westminster, defining inheritance laws, and containing the clause de donis conditionalibus.
  - September – Statute of Winchester introduces new measures against crime (including the Hue and cry) and re-defines the right to bear arms.
- 1286
  - 1 January – a storm surge hits the coast of East Anglia and sweeps away much of the town of Dunwich.
  - 5 June – Edward I of England pays homage to Philip IV of France.
- 1287
  - February – South England flood, affecting the Cinque Ports: A storm surge destroys the town of Old Winchelsea on Romney Marsh and nearby Broomhill. The course of the nearby River Rother is diverted away from New Romney, which is almost destroyed, ending its role as a port, with the Rother running instead to the sea at Rye, whose prospects as a port are enhanced. A cliff collapses at Hastings, ending its role as a trade harbour and demolishing part of Hastings Castle. New Winchelsea is established on higher ground.
  - 8 June – rebellion in south Wales by Rhys ap Maredudd begins.
  - 14 December – St. Lucia's flood: a North Sea storm surge devastates the Norfolk coast and The Fens; Spalding and Boston in Lincolnshire are badly affected.
- 1288
  - January – Welsh rebellion suppressed following a siege of Newcastle Emlyn castle.
  - Barmote Courts established.
- 1289
  - 6 November – Treaty of Salisbury: Edward agrees to help Margaret, Maid of Norway, in her bid for the Scottish throne.

== Births ==
- 1281
  - Richard De Bury, statesman (died 1345)
  - Henry, 3rd Earl of Lancaster (died 1345)
- 1282
  - 7 August – Elizabeth of Rhuddlan, daughter of King Edward I (died 1316)
- 1284
  - 25 April – King Edward II of England (died 1327)
- 1285
  - 1 May – Edmund FitzAlan, 9th Earl of Arundel, politician (died 1326)
- 1286
  - 30 June – John de Warenne, 7th Earl of Surrey, politician (died 1347)
  - Hugh the younger Despenser (died 1326)
- 1287
  - 24 January – Richard Aungerville, writer and bishop (died 1345)
  - 25 April – Roger Mortimer, 1st Earl of March, de facto ruler of England (died 1330)

== Deaths ==
- 1280
  - 22 July – Walter Branscombe, Bishop of Exeter
- 1282
  - 25 August – Thomas de Cantilupe, politician and priest (born c. 1218)
  - 27 October – Roger Mortimer, 1st Baron Mortimer (born 1231)
  - 11 December – Llywelyn ap Gruffudd, Prince of Wales (born c. 1223)
- 1284
  - 19 August – Alphonso, Earl of Chester, son of Edward I of England (born 1273)
- 1285
  - 13 May – Robert de Ros, 1st Baron de Ros (born c. 1213)
- 1286
  - 16 June – Hugh de Balsham, Bishop of Ely (year of birth unknown)
  - 9 November – Roger Northwode, statesman (born 1230)
  - William of Moerbeke, Dominican classicist (born 1215)
