= Mabel of Bury St. Edmunds =

British artist

Mabel of Bury St. Edmunds (13th-century) was an embroiderer in the Opus Anglicanum tradition. Her skill was such that she was one of the few artisans to appear by name in the royal records of Henry III: between the years 1239 and 1245 she appeared in the king's writs no fewer than twenty-four times.

It has been suggested that Mabel was the last majorly acknowledged woman embroider in England during the Middle Ages: after this time, records of embroidery generally stated the names of male merchants (regardless of who were the actual artisans in towns and villages).

== Chasuble ==
Mabel was first mentioned in relation to the commission of a chasuble for the King in November 1239. It is assumed that the king was aware of her work prior to this time and that she was already a master of her craft for this was an important commission and would not have been handed out lightly. Although the conditions under which Mabel produced her work are unknown, evidence points to her having been an “independent producer", rather than a royal servant or a member of someone else's atelier.

The chasuble took Mabel about two years to finish. An apparently sumptuous work, it included pearls and gold, ordered in 1241 as she was near completion. At the king's command, a committee of experts conducted an appraisal to determine the value of the finished work as well as an appropriate fee for Mabel's work: the king was most insistent that Mabel be paid fairly with a generous sum, and even ordered that she be given the remnants of all precious materials used for the creation of the chasuble. The consideration which Henry gave to this artisan suggests that she was superbly talented in her craft.

== Westminster Abbey Standard ==
In 1243, Henry III ordered Mabel to create a second piece of work for him: an embroidered standard that was to be hung adjacent to an altar in Westminster Abbey. Henry III described the iconography he wanted to see, images of St. John and the Virgin adequately embroidered with gold, but he showed immense respect for Mabel's “artistry and judgment” by allowing her to develop the design and composition independently.

== Later years ==
There are a few theories circulating about what happened to Mabel after the banner was complete, for she seems to have disappeared from all records for eleven years. She may have “slipped into anonymity” working under someone for this period, but her name being so famous prior to this makes that unlikely. It is more likely that she finished her period of working in the king's service and retired from London to her home town of Bury St Edmunds.

This is born out by a grant made by Henry in 1256. The king was visiting Bury St Edmunds; Mabel's presence there was brought to his attention. For her services in the creation of “ecclesiastical ornaments” he commanded that she be given “six measures of cloth agreeable to her and the fur of a rabbit for a robe.” A gift normally granted to abbots and knights, this shows the respect and esteem that Henry felt for this immensely talented embroiderer.
