= 1050s in England =

Events from the 1050s in England.

== Incumbents ==
- Monarch – Edward the Confessor

== Events ==
- 1050
  - 29 June – first Bishop of Exeter, Leofric, consecrated, uniting the former episcopal sees of Crediton and Cornwall.
  - Sweyn Godwinson pardoned for murdering his cousin.
- 1051
  - 29 June – the Norman bishop Robert of Jumièges is enthroned as Archbishop of Canterbury, having been appointed to the vacant seat by the king. He refuses to consecrate Spearhafoc as his successor as the Bishop of London, and William the Norman is appointed instead. Spearhafoc vanishes with the gold and jewels he had been given to make the royal crown and is never seen again.
  - September – following a rebellion, King Edward the Confessor exiles Godwin, Earl of Wessex, to Flanders.
  - Heregeld is abolished in England by King Edward the Confessor.
- 1052
  - Prince Gruffydd ap Llywelyn of Wales raids Herefordshire.
  - 14 September – Godwin, Earl of Wessex returns to England from exile. He sails a large fleet into London forcing King Edward to reinstate him.
  - Three bishops appointed by King Edward – Robert of Jumièges; Ulfus Normanus, Bishop of Dorchester, and William the Norman, Bishop of London – flee the country.
  - Stigand enthroned as Archbishop of Canterbury.
  - William, Duke of Normandy, visits King Edward and may have been promised the throne after Edward's death.
- 1053
  - 15 April – Godwin dies at Winchester and is succeeded by his son Harold Godwinson as Earl of Wessex.
- 1054
  - 27 July – Siward, Earl of Northumbria, invades Scotland to support Malcolm Canmore against King Macbeth.
- 1055
  - Siward dies; Tostig Godwinson becomes Earl of Northumbria.
  - 24 October – Gruffydd ap Llywelyn and Ælfgar, exiled son of Leofric, Earl of Mercia, raid England, and sack Hereford.
  - Harold Godwinson makes peace with Ælfgar, who returns from exile.
- 1056
  - 17 June – Battle of Glasbury: Gruffydd ap Llywelyn raids England again, and kills Leofgar of Hereford. Gruffydd's forces burn down Hereford Cathedral. .
- 1057
  - Edward the Exile, son of Edmund Ironside, returns to England, but dies shortly after.
  - Leofric, Earl of Mercia dies, and his son Ælfgar is again exiled for treason.
- 1058
  - Ælfgar, supported by the Welsh and Norwegians, unsuccessfully attacks the English coast; he is nonetheless re-instated as Earl of Mercia.
- 1059
  - Malcolm III of Scotland pays homage to King Edward.

== Births ==
- 1050
  - Waltheof II, Earl of Northumbria (died 1076)
- 1051
  - Edgar Ætheling, uncrowned King of England (died c. 1126)

== Deaths ==
- 1050
  - 29 October – Eadsige, Archbishop of Canterbury
- 1051
  - 22 January – Ælfric Puttoc, archbishop of York
- 1052
  - 6 March – Emma of Normandy, consort of Æthelred and Cnut (born c. 985)
- 1053
  - 15 April – Godwin, Earl of Wessex (born c. 1001)
- 1056
  - 10 February – Æthelstan, Bishop of Hereford
  - 16 June – Leofgar of Hereford, Bishop of Hereford
  - (latest probable date) – Godgifu (Goda of England), princess (born 1004)
- 1057
  - 19 April – Edward the Exile, son of Edmund II of England (born 1016)
  - 31 August – Leofric, Earl of Mercia (born 968)
- 1058
  - Alfwold, Bishop of Sherborne
