= 1220s in England =

Events from the 1220s in England.

== Incumbents ==
- Monarch – Henry III

== Events ==
- 1220
  - 28 April – foundation stone of Salisbury Cathedral is laid. The cathedral is being relocated from Old Sarum and renewed in Gothic style.
  - 17 May – second coronation of King Henry III at Westminster Abbey, Pope Honorius III having deemed that Henry's first coronation at Gloucester in 1216 had not been carried out in accordance with church rites.
  - May – construction of the Lady Chapel at Westminster Abbey begins.
  - Re-building in Gothic style begins at York Minster and Beverley Minster.
- 1221
  - 25 April – Eustace of Fauconberg is consecrated Bishop of London; from about this year he also serves as the first known Chancellor of the Exchequer.
  - 21 June – Henry's ten-year-old sister, Joan of England, marries King Alexander II of Scotland at York Minster.
  - August – arrival of first Dominican friars in England.
  - 15 August – Dominicans found Blackfriars, Oxford.
- 1222
  - 17 April – Stephen Langton, Archbishop of Canterbury, opens the Synod of Oxford at Osney Abbey, which introduces measures against Jews.
  - June – Great Council at Westminster approves taxes on all property owners to contribute to the defense of the Crusader kingdoms, to be gathered and transferred by the Templars.
  - 15 July – rioting after London defeats Westminster in an annual wrestling contest; ring-leaders hanged or mutilated in punishment.
  - Patent rolls authorise minting of the silver farthing in London.
- 1223
  - 28 August – Richard de Lucy named admiral of England.
  - Henry III given limited powers of governance, although not yet fully of age.
  - William Marshal, 2nd Earl of Pembroke, seizes Carmarthen Castle and Cardigan Castle from Llywelyn the Great.
  - Justiciar Hubert de Burgh, occupies Montgomeryshire.
  - John of Brienne, King of Jerusalem, visits England for fundraising.
- 1224
  - 5 May – War between France and England breaks out when Louis VIII of France attacks Poitou and northern Gascony.
  - June–August – Siege of Bedford: rebels surrender to Hubert de Burgh.
  - 10 September – Arrival of the first Franciscan friars in England.
- 1225
  - Magna Carta affirmed by Henry III, in return for issuing a property tax.
  - King Horn, the oldest known English verse romance, written.
  - Franciscan house founded at Greyfriars in London.
- 1226
  - Cardigan Castle and Carmarthen Castle become royal castles.
  - Nuneaton is granted a chartered market.
- 1227
  - January – Henry III declares himself to be of age.
  - March – England makes a truce with France.
- 1228
  - 3 August – Walter d'Eynsham enthroned as Archbishop of Canterbury by his fellow monks of the cathedral chapter there. He will not be consecrated.
  - Hubert de Burgh leads an unsuccessful military campaign in south Wales.
- 1229
  - 5 January – Walter d'Eynsham's appointment as Archbishop of Canterbury is quashed by the Pope and King following his failure to acquit himself in theological examination.
  - 10 June – Richard le Grant enthroned as Archbishop of Canterbury.
  - October – planned campaign in France delayed; Henry blames Hubert de Burgh.
  - Robert Grosseteste is teaching theology to Franciscans at the University of Oxford by about this date.
  - First St. John's Bridge, Lechlade, built over the River Thames.
  - Beverston Castle founded in Gloucestershire.

== Births ==
- 1220
  - Approximate date – Roger Bacon, philosopher and scientist (died 1292)
- 1222
  - 4 August – Richard de Clare, 6th Earl of Hertford, soldier (died 1262)
- 1223
  - John FitzAlan, 6th Earl of Arundel (died 1267)
  - Hugh le Despencer, 1st Baron le Despencer (died 1265)
  - Llywelyn ap Gruffudd, Prince of Wales (died 1282)

== Deaths ==
- 1220
  - 1 June – Henry de Bohun, 1st Earl of Hereford (born 1176)
  - c. November – Philip of Oldcoates, nobleman and royal official (fl. before 1194)
- 1221
  - Roger Bigod, 2nd Earl of Norfolk (year of birth unknown)
- 1224
  - William d'Aubigny, 4th Earl of Arundel (born c. 1203)
- 1225
  - Hugh Bigod, 3rd Earl of Norfolk (born 1186)
- 1226
  - 7 March – William Longespée, 3rd Earl of Salisbury, military leader (born c. 1167)
  - 11 December – Robert de Ros, baron (born 1177)
- 1228
  - June (approximate date) – Reginald de Braose, rebel baron
  - 9 July – Stephen Langton, Archbishop of Canterbury (born c. 1150)
