= 1020s in England =

Events from the 1020s in England.

== Incumbents ==
- Monarch – Canute

== Events ==
- 1020
  - Rotunda of Bury St Edmunds Abbey constructed.
  - Aethelnoth enthroned as Archbishop of Canterbury.
- 1021
- 1022
- 1023
  - Siward, a Dane, appointed Earl of Northumbria.
  - Archbishop Wulfstan II of York writes Homilies.
- 1024
- 1025
  - King Cnut forms an alliance with Byzantine emperor Constantine VIII.
- 1026
  - The Battle of the Helgeå is fought off the coast of Sweden: naval forces of Cnut's North Sea Empire defeat the combined Swedish and Norwegian royal fleets.
- 1027
  - Cnut negotiates a tax-free route for English pilgrims to Rome where at Easter (26 March) he attends the coronation of Conrad II, Holy Roman Emperor.
  - Cnut invades the Kingdom of Scotland, forcing Malcolm II to pay homage.
  - Approximate date – Ealdred succeeds Lyfing as Abbot of Tavistock.
- 1028
  - Cnut becomes King of Norway in addition to King of Denmark and England.
- 1029

== Births ==
- 1022
  - King Harold Godwinson (died 1066)
- 1026
  - Tostig Godwinson, Earl of Northumbria (died 1066)
- 1027/28
  - King William I of England (died 1087)

== Deaths ==
- 1020
  - 12 June – Lyfing, Archbishop of Canterbury
- 1023
  - 28 May – Wulfstan II, Archbishop of York
