= Appleby Friary =

Friary in Cumbria, England

Coordinates: 54.581233°N 2.489742°W

Appleby Friary was a friary at Appleby-in-Westmorland, in Cumbria, England. It was a Carmelite friary founded c. 1290 and dissolved in 1539. Its patrons included Lord Clifford of Appleby and Lord Vesey.

A Grade II listed 19th-century house in Appleby bears the name The Friary. The location of the friary itself remains uncertain.
