= 1260s in England =

Events from the 1260s in England.

== Incumbents ==
- Monarch – Henry III

== Events ==
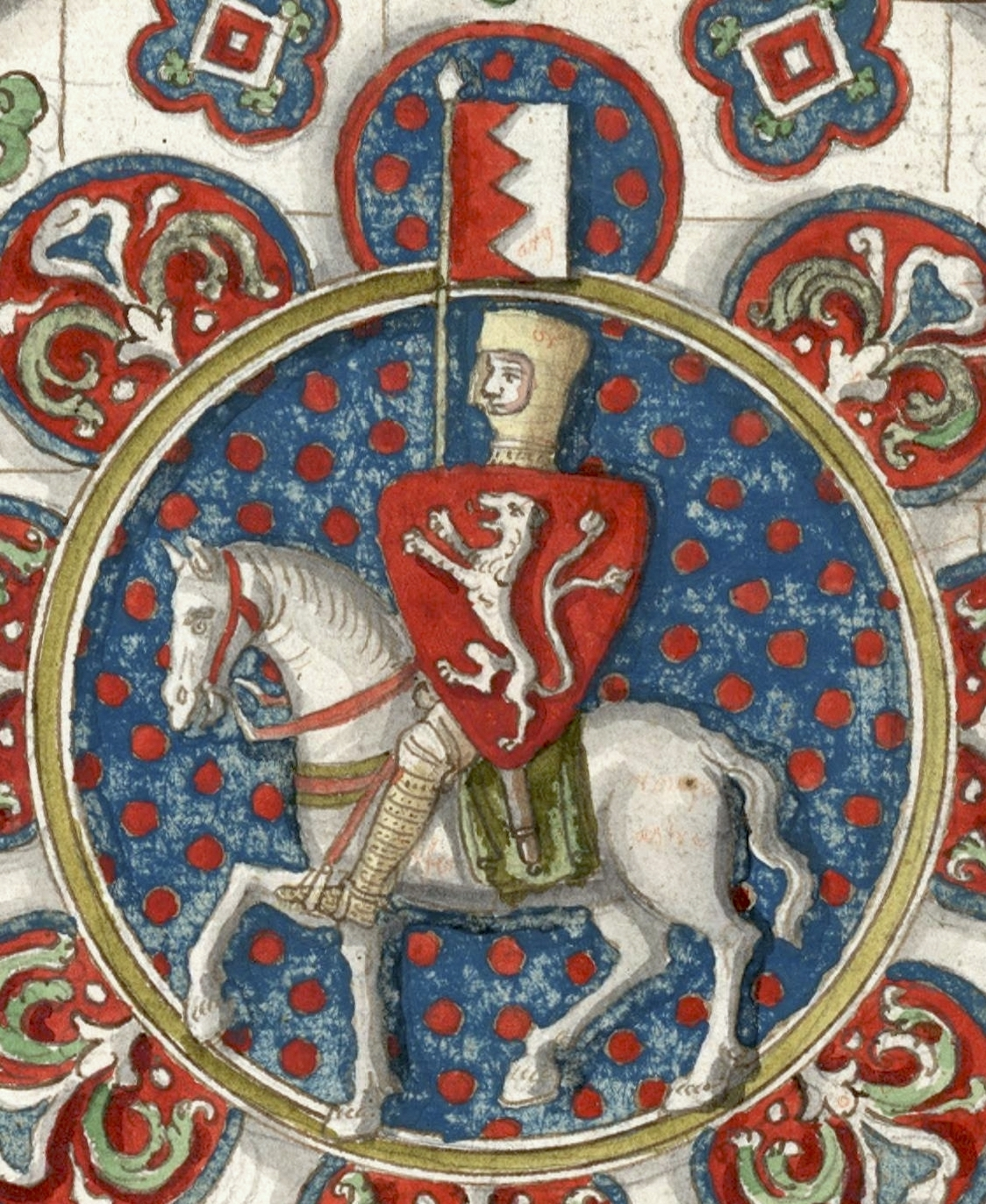
Simon de Montfort

- 1260
  - Llywelyn ap Gruffudd attacks English forces in South Wales.
  - 22 August – truce agreed between England and Wales.
- 1261
  - Early – following disputes, northern academics from the University of Cambridge set up a University of Northampton by royal charter but it is suppressed by the Crown in 1265.
  - 12 June – King Henry III of England obtains a papal bull releasing him from the Provisions of Oxford, setting the stage for a civil war over the power struggle between the crown and the aristocracy.
  - July – Henry regains control of the government.
- 1262
  - 25 January – canonisation of Richard of Chichester (d. 1253).
  - Consecration of a priory church in Oxford, probably the largest of the Dominican Order in England.
- 1263
  - January – Provisions of Westminster re-issued.
  - April – Simon de Montfort, 6th Earl of Leicester, seizes control of southern England after Henry refuses to accept the Provisions of Oxford.
  - 16 July – rebels occupy London.
  - 2 October – Henry travels to Boulogne for an attempt to broker peace by King Louis IX of France; barons refuse to accept terms.
  - Baronial forces led by Robert de Ferrers and Henry de Montfort lay siege to Worcester. The attackers finally enter the city and are allowed to sack the city. They kill most of the Jewish community as part of the targeting of Jews during the conflict with the Barons by allies of de Montfort.
  - Presumed date – Balliol College is established in the University of Oxford by John I de Balliol on its modern-day site.
- 1264
  - 23 January – King Louis IX of France issues the Mise of Amiens, a settlement between King Henry III of England and barons led by Simon de Montfort heavily favouring the former, which leads to the Second Barons' War.
  - February – Second Barons' War begins as Henry returns to fight Simon de Montfort's rebels.
  - April – targeting of Jews during the conflict with the Barons: Gilbert de Clare, 6th Earl of Hertford, leads a massacre of the Jews at Canterbury; at about the same time, another of de Montfort's followers, John fitz John, leads a massacre of Jews in London.
  - 17–26 April – Second Barons' War: de Montfort besieges Rochester Castle in Kent but fails to take it.
  - 14 May – Second Barons' War: the Battle of Lewes is fought between Simon de Montfort and King Henry III in Sussex. By the end of the battle, Montfort's forces capture both King Henry and his son, Prince Edward, and Henry is forced to sign the Mise of Lewes making Montfort the "uncrowned king of England".
  - June – Simon de Montfort summons a parliament in London, the first to include Knights of the Shire.
  - 17 June – A fire destroys many of the wooden houses in the city of Gloucester.
  - 12 August – Peace of Canterbury: papal legate and King Louis IX of France condemn the rebels, who are later excommunicated.
  - 14 September – Walter de Merton, former Chancellor of England, formally completes the foundation of the House of Scholars of Merton to provide education in Malden, later becoming Merton College in the University of Oxford.
  - In the Peerage of England, the title Baron de Ros, the oldest continuously held peerage title in England, is created by writ of summons.
- 1265
  - 20 January – Montfort's Parliament, the first to include burgesses, and to insist that members be elected, assembles at Westminster.
  - 28 May – Second Barons' War: Prince Edward escapes from captivity and rejoins royalist forces.
  - 22 June – Simon de Montfort signs a treaty with Llywelyn ap Gruffudd, recognising his rule over Wales.
  - 4 August – Second Barons' War: The Battle of Evesham is fought in Worcestershire, with the army of Edward defeating the forces of rebellious barons led by Simon de Montfort and killing Montfort and many of his allies.
  - 16 September – Second Barons' War: Henry disinherits all rebels against his rule.
- 1266
  - 15 May – Second Barons' War: Battle of Chesterfield – Forces led by Henry of Almain, son of Richard of Cornwall, defeat rebels under Robert de Ferrers in a minor skirmish at Chesterfield, Derbyshire. Robert is taken as a prisoner to London, and in Parliament disinherits. In July, he is forced to surrender land and Liverpool Castle to Edmund Crouchback, second son of Henry III.
  - 13 October – Dictum of Kenilworth provides terms of peace in the Second Barons' War between supporters of the slain rebel leader Simon de Montfort and Henry III.
  - 13 December – Siege of Kenilworth: Forces under Henry III capture Kenilworth Castle from remaining rebels in the Second Barons' War after a 6-month siege. During the siege Archbishop William Freney tries to negotiate with the garrison but is refused entry.
- 1267
  - 9 April – Second Barons' War: Gilbert de Clare, 6th Earl of Hertford occupies London.
  - June – Second Barons' War: Prince Edward captures the Isle of Ely, and the remaining rebels surrender.
  - Summer – Second Barons' War: rebels and King Henry III agree to peace terms as laid out in the Dictum of Kenilworth.
  - 29 September – Treaty of Montgomery: King Henry III acknowledges Llywelyn ap Gruffudd's title of Prince of Wales.
  - 19 November – the Statute of Marlborough is passed, confirming Magna Carta and the Provisions of Westminster. It is the oldest English law still (partially) in force.
  - Roger Bacon completes his work Opus Majus and sends it to Pope Clement IV, who had requested it be written; the work contains wide-ranging discussion of mathematics, optics, alchemy, astronomy, astrology and other topics, and includes what some believe to be the first description of a magnifying glass. Bacon also completes Opus Minus, a summary of Opus Majus, later in the same year.
  - Howden Minster in Yorkshire becomes a collegiate church.
- 1268
  - The first Year Books (annual law reports) appear.
  - Approximate date – Henry de Bracton dies leaving the first substantial work on English law, De Legibus et Consuetudinibus Angliae, incomplete.
- 1269
  - 13 October – dedication of the newly rebuilt Westminster Abbey.

== Births ==
- 1260
  - Approximate date – Henry de Cobham, 1st Baron Cobham (died 1339)
- 1261
  - 1 March – Hugh Despenser the Elder, 1st Earl of Winchester, court favourite (hanged 1326)
- 1265
  - 1 February (latest likely year) – Walter Stapledon, bishop (murdered 1326)
- 1267
  - 3 February – Richard Fitzalan, 1st Earl of Arundel, soldier (died 1302)

== Deaths ==
- 1260
  - c. 8 September – John Crakehall, Lord High Treasurer of England and Archdeacon of Bedford (year of birth unknown)
  - 5 December – Aymer de Valence, Bishop of Winchester (born c. 1222)
- 1262
  - 14 July – Richard de Clare, 6th Earl of Gloucester, soldier (born 1222)
- 1263
  - Hamo de Crevecoeur, Lord Warden of the Cinque Ports (year of birth unknown)
- 1265
  - 20 January – John Maunsell, Lord Chancellor (born 1190s)
  - 25 April – Roger de Quincy, 2nd Earl of Winchester, politician (born 1195)
  - 4 August – killed in the Battle of Evesham:
    - Hugh le Despencer, 1st Baron le Despencer (born 1223)
    - Henry de Montfort (born 1238)
    - Peter de Montfort (born c. 1215)
    - Simon de Montfort, 6th Earl of Leicester (born 1208)
- 1266
  - Hugh Bigod, Justiciar (born c. 1211)
- 1267
  - John FitzAlan, 6th Earl of Arundel (born 1223)
- 1268
  - Henry de Bracton, jurist (year of birth unknown)
