= Great Rumour =

1377 English rural worker protest movement

The Great Rumour was a protest movement that emerged in south-east and south-west England during 1377.

During 1377, protests began to break out in south-east and south-west England. Rural workers organised themselves into protest groups and refused to work for their lords, arguing that, according to the Domesday Book, they were exempt from requests for feudal labour services. This argument depended on the legal concept of ancient demesne, and their belief that the Domesday Book was an accurate reflection of early land tenure agreements. Unsuccessful appeals and petitions were made both to the law courts and to King Richard II. The events of the Great Rumour closely resembled much of the subsequent Peasants' Revolt of 1381.

== Bibliography ==
- Faith, Rosamond (1987). "The 'Great Rumour' of 1377 and Peasant Ideology". In Hilton, Rodney; Alton, T. H. (eds.). The English Rising of 1381. Cambridge, UK: Cambridge University Press. pp. 43–73. ISBN 9781843837381.
