= 1160s in England =

Events from the 1160s in England.

== Incumbents ==
- Monarch – Henry II

== Events ==
- 1160
  - 2 November – betrothal of 5-year-old Henry the Young King and 2-year-old Marguerite, daughter of Louis VII of France; she brings Norman Vexin to the English crown as a dowry.
  - The island of Lundy is granted to the Knights Templar by Henry II.
  - Approximate date – Derby School is founded by Walkelin de Derby in Derby; it will survive until 1989.
- 1161
  - 5 January – canonisation of Edward the Confessor.
  - c. April – Bartholomew becomes Bishop of Exeter.
- 1162
  - 3 June – Thomas Becket consecrated as Archbishop of Canterbury and resigns as Lord Chancellor.
  - Becket decrees that Trinity Sunday should henceforth be celebrated in England.
  - King Henry II raises the Danegeld (by now, merely a royal tax) for the last time.
- 1163
  - January – Henry II suppresses a revolt in Wales, and captures Prince Rhys ap Gruffydd.
  - 6 March – Gilbert Foliot is translated from Hereford to become Bishop of London, an office which he will hold until his death in 1187.
  - 1 July – Henry calls the Welsh princes and King Malcolm IV of Scotland to do homage at Woodstock Palace; the Welsh rebel.
  - 1 October – Becket resists Henry II's demands to extend the jurisdiction of secular courts to the clergy.
  - 13 October – the bones of Edward the Confessor are translated to Westminster Abbey.
  - John of Salisbury completes his Life of Anselm.
- 1164
  - 30 January – Henry II enacts the Constitutions of Clarendon (at Clarendon Palace in Wiltshire) in an attempt to restore royal jurisdiction over the Church.
  - 2 November – Becket found guilty of contempt of court and goes into exile to the Continent.
- 1165
  - c. August – Battle of Crogen: Owain Gwynedd, ruler of the Kingdom of Gwynedd in north Wales, having formed an alliance with his nephew Rhys ap Gruffydd, prince of Deheubarth, to challenge English rule, defeats Henry II and drives his army out of Wales.
- 1166
  - July – Henry II conquers Brittany, granting the territory to his son Geoffrey.
  - Henry, from Clarendon Palace in Wiltshire, enacts the Assize of Clarendon, reforming the law, underpinning the importance of jury trial (which will have long-term global influence in common law countries), creating royal assizes as secular courts and defining the legal duties of sheriffs.
  - Anglo-Norman soldier William Marshal is knighted while on campaign in Normandy; he will be described as "the greatest knight that ever lived".
- 1167
  - The exiled King of Leinster, Diarmait Mac Murchada, having paid homage to Henry, begins to recruit Norman knights for an invasion of Ireland.
  - Increased enrolment at the University of Oxford after English students are barred from attending Paris University.
  - Earliest likely date for construction of the building much later known as Marlipins Museum in Shoreham-by-Sea commencing, one of the earliest surviving secular buildings in England.
  - December – Eleanor of Aquitaine, queen consort of England, has all her possessions shipped to France. She will not return to England until 1173, as a prisoner.
- 1168
  - 1 February – Henry II and Eleanor's daughter, Matilda, age 12, marries Henry the Lion, Duke of Saxony in Minden Cathedral.
- 1169
  - January – Treaty of Montmirail: Henry II agrees to divide his French territories amongst his sons; Aquitaine to Richard, Brittany to Geoffrey, and the remainder to Henry.
  - 1 May – Norman barons land an invasion force at Wexford in support of Dermot.

== Births ==
- 1162
  - 13 October – Leonora of England, queen consort of Alfonso VIII of Castile (died 1214)
- 1163
  - Aubrey de Vere, 2nd Earl of Oxford (died 1214)
- 1165
  - October – Joan of England, Queen of Sicily, daughter of Henry II of England (died 1199)
- 1166
  - 24 December – John, King of England (died 1216)
  - Possible date – William de Warenne, 5th Earl of Surrey (died 1240)
- 1167
  - Latest likely date – William Longespée, 3rd Earl of Salisbury, Anglo-Norman noble and soldier, an illegitimate son of King Henry II of England (died 1226)

== Deaths ==
- 1161
  - 18 April – Theobald of Bec, Archbishop of Canterbury (born c. 1090)
- 1166
  - c. 27 December – Robert de Chesney, Bishop of Lincoln
- 1167
  - 12 January – Aelred of Rievaulx, abbot (born 1110)
  - 27 February – Robert of Melun, theologian and bishop (born c. 1100)
  - 10 September – Empress Matilda, first female ruler of England (born 1102)
- 1168
  - 5 April – Robert de Beaumont, 2nd Earl of Leicester, Justiciar (born 1104)
- 1169
  - July – Hilary of Chichester, bishop (born c. 1110)
