= 1120s in England =

Events from the 1120s in England.

== Incumbents ==
- Monarch – Henry I

== Events ==
- 1120
  - 25 November – sinking of the White Ship in the English Channel off Barfleur. King Henry I of England's only legitimate son, William Adelin, is among 300 who drown.
- 1121
  - 24 January – Henry I marries Adeliza of Louvain at Windsor Castle.
  - June – Reading Abbey founded by Henry I.
  - Plympton Priory in Devon re-founded as an Augustinian house by William Warelwast, Bishop of Exeter.
  - Foss Dyke scoured.
- 1122
  - Priory of St Frideswide, Oxford, established as an Augustinian house.
- 1123
  - 18 February – William de Corbeil enthroned as Archbishop of Canterbury.
  - 26 August – first Bishop of Bath (Godfrey) consecrated.
  - Louis VI of France supports rebels against English rule in Normandy.
  - St Bartholomew's Hospital in London founded by Rahere.
- 1124
  - Henry I unsuccessfully invades the Kingdom of France, having defeated rebels in Normandy.
  - Christmas – moneyers punished by castration following runaway inflation.
- 1125
  - William of Malmesbury completes his histories of England, Gesta Regum Anglorum and Gesta Pontificum Anglorum.
- 1126
  - Archbishoprics of Canterbury and York declared equal.
  - 25 December – Henry I asks his nobles to recognise Empress Matilda as his heir.
- 1127
  - 1 January – English nobles accept Matilda as heir.
- 1128
  - 17 June – the dowager Empress Matilda marries Geoffrey Plantagenet, heir to the Count of Anjou, in Le Mans.
  - Foundation of the first Cistercian abbey in England, at Waverley in Surrey.
- 1129
  - 4 October – Henry of Blois becomes Bishop of Winchester, an office which he will hold until his death in 1171.

== Births ==
- 1120
  - Approximate date – John of Salisbury, bishop and scholar (died 1180 in France)
- 1125
  - Renaud de Courtenay, noble (died 1194)

== Deaths ==
- 1120
  - 25 November – White Ship
    - William Adelin, son of Henry I (born 1103)
    - Richard d'Avranches, 2nd Earl of Chester, Anglo-Norman noble and soldier (born 1094)
    - Matilda FitzRoy, Countess of Perche, illegitimate daughter of King Henry I of England
- 1122
  - 20 October – Ralph d'Escures, Archbishop of Canterbury
- 1124
  - 15 March – Ernulf, Bishop of Rochester (born 1040, France)
- 1126
  - Edgar Ætheling, last member of the Anglo-Saxon royal house (born 1052)
- 1128
  - 5 September – Ranulf Flambard, Bishop of Durham
- 1129
  - January – Ranulph le Meschin, 1st Earl of Chester (born 1074, France)
  - Symeon of Durham, chronicler
