= 1030s in England =

Events from the 1030s in England.

== Incumbents ==
- Monarch – Canute (to 12 November 1035), Harold I

== Events ==
- 1030
- 1031
  - King Cnut invades Scotland and forces the submission of Malcolm II of Scotland.
- 1032
- 1033
- 1034
- 1035
  - 12 November – King Cnut the Great dies. Harold Harefoot becomes regent of England on behalf of his half-brother Harthacnut who is in Denmark.
- 1036
  - Council of Oxford declares Harold regent for Harthacnut.
  - Harold seizes the royal treasury from dowager Queen Emma of Normandy.
  - c. 5 February – Godwin, Earl of Wessex, kills Alfred Aetheling when the latter launches an unsuccessful attempt to restore the Anglo-Saxon House of Wessex.
- 1037
  - Harold recognised as King of England in his own right.
  - Harold exiles Emma to Bruges.
- 1038
  - Eadsige enthroned as Archbishop of Canterbury.
- 1039
  - Unsuccessful English invasion of Wales.

== Births ==
- 1033
  - Anselm of Canterbury, Archbishop of Canterbury (died 1109)
- 1035
  - Hereward the Wake, rebel

== Deaths ==
- 1035
  - 12 November – King Canute the Great (born c. 995, Denmark)
- 1036
  - c. 5 February – Alfred Aetheling, Anglo-Saxon prince
- 1038
  - 29 October – Aethelnoth, Archbishop of Canterbury
