= 1360s in England =

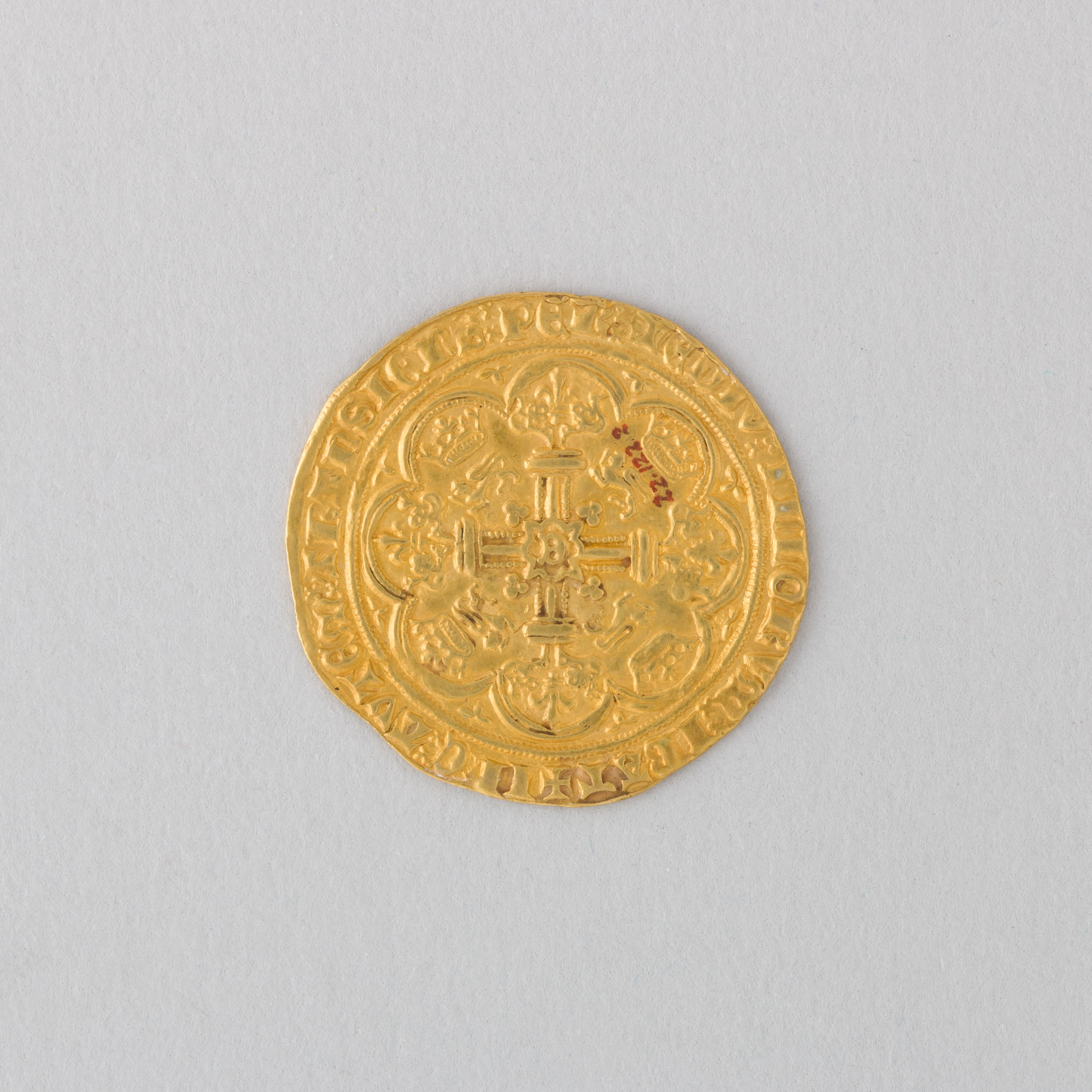

Events from the 1360s in England.

== Incumbents ==
- Monarch – Edward III

== Events ==
1360

- January – Hundred Years' War: Edward III marches on Paris.
- 15 March – The town of Winchelsea in East Sussex is attacked and burned by an expeditionary force from France.
- April – Hundred Years' War: English forces leave the vicinity of Paris after laying waste to the countryside.
- 8 May – Hundred Years' War: the Treaty of Brétigny is signed, marking the end of the first phase of the War. Under its terms, Edward III gives up his claim to the French throne and releases King John II of France in return for French land, including Calais and Gascony.
- 24 October – Hundred Years' War: Treaty of Calais ratifies the earlier Treaty of Brétigny, but omits mention of claims to the French throne.
- Completion of nave vault at York Minster.

1361

- Spring – outbreak of plague.
- 10 October – marriage of Edward, the Black Prince and Joan of Kent at Windsor Castle.
- Justices of the Peace Act 1361 introduces the title of Justice of the peace. Portions of the Act will still be in force more than 650 years later.
- The Hart Dyke family settle at Lullingstone Castle in Kent, where they will still be in residence in the 21st century.

1362

- 16 January – Grote Mandrenke storm sweeps across England: Salisbury and Norwich Cathedrals and St Albans Abbey are damaged and the Humber estuary port of Ravenser Odd is obliterated.
- June – under the terms of the will of Sir John de Wingfield (d. 1361), the church of St Andrew and a college of priests are founded in Wingfield, Suffolk.
- 22 June – alliance between England and Castile.
- November – Lionel of Antwerp, son of Edward III, is created Duke of Clarence.
- The Pleading in English Act makes English rather than Law French the official language in law courts.
- The English Hospice of the Most Holy Trinity and St Thomas is established in Rome to provide accommodation for pilgrims from England.
- Approximate date – spire added to Church of St Mary and All Saints, Chesterfield, Derbyshire.

1363

- 29 June – Hundred Years' War: Edward, the Black Prince takes control of Aquitaine.
- November – David II of Scotland makes an agreement for Edward III to succeed him as King of Scotland.
- Parliament opened in English for the first time.
- Royal decree prohibits all forms of Sunday recreation other than practice with the English longbow.
- Sumptuary law regulates dress according to the wearer's social class.

1364

- 4 March – Scottish Parliament rejects Edward's right to rule Scotland.
- Ranulf Higden completes the Polychronicon, a work of world history.

1365

- Parliament passes the second Statute of Praemunire, forbidding appeals to the Pope.

1366

- May – William Edington elected to the Archbishopric of Canterbury but declines the position due to ill-health.
- 24 July – Simon Langham enthroned as Archbishop of Canterbury.
- Edward III grants a charter to the Kent port of Queenborough, named in honour of his consort.
- Statutes of Kilkenny forbid contact between 'obedient English' and 'Irish enemies' in Ireland.

1367

- February – Castilian Civil War – English forces led by Edward, the Black Prince side with Pedro of Castile against Pedro's brother Henry II of Castile.
- 3 April – Castilian Civil War: English defeat Franco-Castilian forces at the Battle of Nájera.
- William Langland begins work on the poem The Vision of Piers Plowman.

1368

- 30 January – Hundred Years' War: barons in English-controlled territory in France object to new taxes, and appeal to King Charles V of France.
- 12 September – Death of Plantaganet heiress Blanche of Lancaster (first wife of John of Gaunt) at Tutbury Castle aged (probably) 26 (perhaps of the Black Death), inspiring Geoffrey Chaucer's first major poem, The Book of the Duchess.
- 11 October – William Whittlesey enthroned as Archbishop of Canterbury.
- Powers of Justices of the Peace legally established.

1369

- 21 May – Hundred Years' War: Charles V of France renounces the Treaty of Brétigny and declares war on England.
- 3 June – Hundred Years' War: Edward III once again formally claims the throne of France.
- August – Alice Perrers gains influence at court following the death of Queen Philippa of Hainault.
- September – Hundred Years' War: French burn Portsmouth; English raids on Picardy and Normandy.
- 30 November – Hundred Years' War: Charles V of France recaptures most of Aquitaine from the English.
- December – Financed by Charles V of France, Owain Lawgoch launches a Welsh invasion fleet against the English in an attempt to claim the throne of Wales, but a storm causes him to abandon the invasion.
- 14-year truce between England and Scotland signed.

== Births ==
1361

- John Beaumont, 4th Baron Beaumont (died 1396)

1363

- Thomas Langley, cardinal bishop of Durham and Lord Chancellor (died 1437)

1364

- 30 November – John FitzAlan, 2nd Baron Arundel (died 1390)

1365

- John de Ros, 5th Baron de Ros (died 1394)

1366

- 22 March – Thomas de Mowbray, 1st Duke of Norfolk (died 1399)
- Lady Elizabeth FitzAlan (died 1425)

1367

- 6 January – Richard II of England (died 1400)
- 3 April – Henry IV of England (died 1413)
- Michael de la Pole, 2nd Earl of Suffolk (died 1415)

1368

- Thomas Hoccleve, poet (died 1426)

1369

- William de Ros, 6th Baron de Ros, Lord High Treasurer (died 1414)
- John Dunstaple, composer (died 1453)

== Deaths ==
1360

- 26 February – Roger Mortimer, 2nd Earl of March, military leader (born 1328)
- 26 December – Thomas Holland, 1st Earl of Kent, nobleman and military commander (born c. 1314)
- Geoffrey the Baker, chronicler
- William de Bohun, 1st Earl of Northampton, nobleman and military commander (born c. 1310)

1361

- Henry of Grosmont, 1st Duke of Lancaster (born c. 1306)
- Richard Badew, Chancellor of Cambridge University
- John Beauchamp, 3rd Baron Beauchamp de Somerset
- Reginald de Cobham, 1st Baron Cobham (born c. 1295)

1362

- 10 April – Maud, Countess of Leicester (born 1339)

1363

- Ranulf Higden, chronicler (born c. 1299)

1364

- January – Edward Balliol (born c. 1283 in Scotland)

1366

- Simon Islip, Archbishop of Canterbury

1368

- 29 November – Lionel of Antwerp, 1st Duke of Clarence (born 1338)

1369

- 16 July – John Grandisson, Bishop of Exeter (born 1292)
- 15 August – Philippa of Hainault, Queen consort of Edward III (born c. 1314)
- 12 September – Blanche of Lancaster (born 1345)
- 13 November – Thomas de Beauchamp, 11th Earl of Warwick (born 1313)
- 31 December – John Chandos, knight (born c. 1320)
- James Audley, knight (born c. 1318)
