= 1000s in England =

Events from the 1000s in England.

== Incumbents ==
- Monarch – Ethelred

== Events ==
- 1000
  - English fleet invades the Isle of Man.
  - English invasion of Cumbria fails.
  - Heroic poem The Battle of Maldon composed.
- 1001
  - First Battle of Alton: English fail to repel Viking raiders.
  - Battle of Pinhoe (Devon): English fail to repel Viking raiders.
  - Edward the Martyr canonised.
  - Ælfgar is consecrated Bishop of Elmham (following the death on 7 October of Æthelstan).
  - Æthelred becomes Bishop of Cornwall but dies shortly after.
- 1002
  - 8 January – Wulfsige III, Bishop of Sherborne, dies and is succeeded by Æthelric.
  - £24,000 of Danegeld paid to the Vikings in return for them leaving England.
  - King Æthelred the Unready marries (as his second wife) Emma, daughter of Richard I, Duke of Normandy, who receives her predecessor's Anglo-Saxon name, Ælfgifu.
  - 13 November – St. Brice's Day massacre: Æthelred orders the deaths of leading Danes in England.
- 1003
  - Sweyn Forkbeard, King of Denmark, invades England in retaliation for the St. Brice's Day massacre.
- 1004
  - Vikings raid Devon and East Anglia.
- 1005
  - 16 November – Ælfric, Archbishop of Canterbury, dies, leaving ships to the people of Wiltshire and Kent in his will, with his best, equipped for sixty men, going to King Æthelred.
  - Continued Viking raids on southern England.
- 1006
  - Ælfheah is elevated from Bishop of Winchester to Archbishop of Canterbury.
  - Summer–Autumn – Danish Viking raiders led by Sweyn Forkbeard raid the south-east from the Isle of Wight to Reading in the Thames Valley where they overwinter at the Wallingford river crossing.
- 1007
  - £36,000 of Danegeld paid to the Vikings in return for them not raiding England for two years.
- 1008
  - Æthelred and Archbishop Wulfstan of York pass laws for the protection of Christianity in England.
- 1009
  - New English fleet assembled.
  - 1 August – Vikings occupy Sandwich, Kent, attack London, and burn Oxford.

== Births ==
- 1001
  - Godwin, Earl of Wessex (died 1053)
- 1003/1004
  - King Edward the Confessor (died 1066)
- 1004
  - Princess Goda of England (died 1055)

== Deaths ==
- 1000/1001
  - 17 November – Ælfthryth, queen consort of England (born c. 945)
- 1001
  - 7 October – Æthelstan, Bishop of Elmham
- 1005
  - 16 November – Ælfric of Abingdon, Archbishop of Canterbury
