= 1010s in England =

Events from the 1010s in England.

== Incumbents ==
- Monarch – Ethelred (to December 1013), Sweyn (December 1013 to 3 February 1014), Ethelred (3 February 1014 to 23 April 1016), Edmund II (23 April to 30 November 1016), then Canute

== Events ==
- 1010
  - 5 May – Battle of Ringmere: Thorkell the Tall defeats an English army under Ulfcytel Snillingr and ravages East Anglia and Mercia.
- 1011
  - 29 September – Siege of Canterbury: Thorkell the tall captures Canterbury after a siege, taking Ælfheah, Archbishop of Canterbury, as a prisoner.
  - Byrhtferth of Ramsey Abbey writes his Manual (Enchiridion) on the divine order of the universe and time.
- 1012
  - Late 1011 or early 1012 (?) – Battle of Nýjamóđa ("Newmouth") near Orford, Suffolk, fought between English and Danes.
  - Heregeld tax is introduced to pay Anglo-Scandinavian mercenaries to fight the Danes.
  - April – King Æthelred the Unready pays £48,000 Danegeld.
  - 19 April – Danes kill Ælfheah of Canterbury, probably at Greenwich, before leaving the country. Thorkell swears allegiance to Æthelred.
- 1013
  - July – Sweyn Forkbeard, King of Denmark, invades England.
  - 25 December – Sweyn is proclaimed King of all England, forcing Æthelred to flee to Normandy.
  - Lyfing is appointed by Æthelred as Archbishop of Canterbury.
- 1014
  - 3 February – Sweyn dies at Gainsborough, Lincolnshire, and his son Cnut is proclaimed King of England by the Danes.
  - March – Æthelred returns to reclaim his throne at the invitation of English nobles.
  - April – Cnut is driven out of England by Æthelred’s forces.
  - Possible date – Olaf II Haraldsson of Norway perhaps attacks London in support of Æthelred.
  - Wulfstan II, Archbishop of York preaches his Latin homily Sermo Lupi ad Anglos ("Wulf's Address to the English"), describing the Danes as "God's judgement on England".
- 1015
  - Sigeferth and Morcar, chief thegns of the Five Boroughs, come to an assembly in Oxford where they are murdered by Eadric Streona. Æthelred orders that Sigeferth's widow, probably named Ealdgyth, be seized and brought to Malmesbury Abbey, but Æthelred's son, Edmund Ironside, seizes and marries her by mid-August.
  - August – Cnut launches an invasion of England.
- 1016
  - 23 April – King Æthelred dies, and is succeeded by his son Edmund Ironside.
  - 7 May – Cnut lays siege to London.
  - May? – Battle of Penselwood: King Edmund defeats the Danes under Cnut.
  - June? – Battle of Sherston: inconclusive battle between The English led by Edmund and the Danes led by Cnut.
  - July? – Cnut lays siege to London a second time.
  - Between July and October
    - Battle of Brentford: King Edmund defeats Cnut, who then besieges London a third time.
    - Battle of Otford King Edmund defeats the Danes under Cnut.
  - 18 October – Battle of Assandun (or Ashingdon), probably in Essex: Cnut defeats King Edmund, leaving the latter as king of Wessex only.
  - 30 November – King Edmund dies and Cnut takes control of the whole country.
- 1017
  - c. July – Cnut marries Æthelred's widow Emma of Normandy.
  - Cnut divides England into the four Earldoms of Wessex, Mercia, East Anglia and Northumbria controlled by himself, Eadric Streona, Thorkell the Tall and Eric Haakonsson respectively.
  - Christmas – Cnut has Eadric killed and Leofric becomes Earl of Mercia.
- 1018
  - Cnut succeeds his brother Harald II of Denmark on the Danish throne.
  - Buckfast Abbey founded in Devon.
  - Cnut levies £10,500 to pay heregeld.
- 1019
  - Exeter monastery restored by Cnut.

== Births ==
- 1015 or 1016
  - King Harold Harefoot (died 1040)
- 1016 or 1017
  - Edmund Ætheling, son of Edmund Ironside (died before 1057 in Hungary)
- c. 1018
  - King Harthacnut (died 1042)

== Deaths ==
- 1010
  - Ælfric of Eynsham, abbot (born c. 955)
- 1012
  - 19 April – Archbishop Ælfheah of Canterbury (born 954)
- 1016
  - 23 April – King Æthelred the Unready (born c. 968)
  - 30 November – King Edmund Ironside
- 1017
  - December – Eadric Streona, ealdorman
