= 1090s in England =

Events from the 1090s in England.

== Incumbents ==
- Monarch – William II

== Events ==
- 1090
  - After buying the allegiance of several local barons, King William II takes control of eastern Normandy.
- 1091
  - 2 February – William II invades western Normandy with a large army. His brothers, Henry and Robert Curthose, mobilise mercenary forces to resist him during a siege at Mont-Saint-Michel. Under terms of the Treaty of Caen, estates on the Cotentin Peninsula of Normandy are surrendered to William, matters being concluded in August.
  - July – Malcolm III of Scotland invades England reaching as far south as Durham. The Normans led by William and Robert march north to oppose the Scots, but a conflict is averted. Malcolm is obliged to accept the terms of the Treaty of Abernethy (1072) and pays homage to William.
  - 17 October – London tornado of 1091: A T8/F4 tornado is recorded in London, which destroys London Bridge and badly damages St Mary-le-Bow church.
- 1092
  - May – William II annexes Cumbria from the Scottish Celtic kingdom of Strathclyde and builds Carlisle Castle.
  - 9 May – Lincoln Cathedral is consecrated.
  - 18 October – Walcher of Malvern correctly predicts the time of a lunar eclipse.
- 1093
  - 6 March – Frankish monk, philosopher and theologian Anselm is nominated as Archbishop of Canterbury; he is consecrated on 4 December.
  - 8 April – the new Winchester Cathedral, constructed by Bishop Walkelin, becomes operational.
  - 11 August – construction of Durham Cathedral begins.
  - 13 November – King Malcolm III of Scotland is killed at the Battle of Alnwick during an attempted invasion of England.
  - Durham Priory re-establishes a monastic house on the Holy Island of Lindisfarne.
  - Normans continue their occupation of southern Wales, constructing Pembroke Castle.
- 1094
  - February – William II and Anselm quarrel about investiture and the overlordship of Church lands.
  - 19 March – William II unsuccessfully invades Normandy.
  - Welsh expel the Marcher Lords and destroy all Norman strongholds in Wales, except Pembroke Castle.
- 1095
  - January – Robert de Mowbray, Earl of Northumberland, rebels. William II besieges his stronghold of Bamburgh Castle which is surrendered by Robert's wife after he has been captured.
  - 25 February – a council at Rockingham is held to resolve the dispute between Anselm and William II, but fails to do so.
  - May – Papal legate forces a reconciliation between William II and Anselm.
- 1096
  - Teaching at what will become the University of Oxford is recorded.
  - King William II takes control of the Duchy of Normandy while his brother Robert II, Duke of Normandy is on the First Crusade.
  - Construction of Norwich Cathedral begun. Herbert de Losinga, first Bishop of Norwich, establishes a Benedictine priory at Norwich and, shortly afterwards, an episcopal grammar school, Norwich School.
- 1097
  - October – Edgar Ætheling overthrows Donald III of Scotland and places his nephew Edgar on the Scottish throne.
  - 8 November – Anselm leaves England following disagreements with William II.
  - Construction of Westminster Hall.
- 1098
  - June or July – in the Battle of Anglesey Sound, a fleet led by Magnus Barefoot, King of Norway, reverses an Anglo-Norman invasion of north Wales.
- 1099
  - 11 November – flooding around North Sea and Mount's Bay, Cornwall.

== Births ==
- 1095
  - Hugh Bigod, 1st Earl of Norfolk (died 1177)
- 1096
  - King Stephen of England (died 1154)

== Deaths ==
- 1091
  - Approximate date – Robert D'Oyly, Norman nobleman and landowner
- 1092
  - 7 May – Remigius de Fécamp, Bishop of Lincoln
- 1094
  - 21 November – Simeon, Abbot of Ely (born c. 994)
- 1095
  - 19 January – Wulfstan, Bishop of Worcester (born 1008)
  - 26 June – Robert the Lotharingian, Bishop of Hereford
- 1096
  - 2 January – William de St-Calais, Bishop of Durham and counsellor of William II
- 1097
  - January/February – Odo of Bayeux, Earl of Kent (born c. 1030s in Normandy; died on First Crusade)
  - c. 1097/8 – Baldwin, Abbot of Bury St Edmunds and royal doctor
- 1098
  - 3 January – Walkelin, Bishop of Winchester
- 1099
  - 3 December – Saint Osmund, Bishop of Salisbury and Lord Chancellor
