= 1190s in England =

Events from the 1190s in England.

== Incumbents ==
- Monarch – Richard I (to 6 April 1199), then John

== Events ==
- 1190
  - 6 February – massacre of almost all Jews in Norwich.
  - 7 March – massacre of Jews at Stamford Fair.
  - 16 March – a mob besieges 150 Jews in York Castle, killing those who do not commit suicide.
  - 18 March – massacre of 57 Jews at Bury St. Edmunds.
  - 4 July – Kings Richard I of England and Philip II of France set out from France to join the Third Crusade.
  - Summer – William Longchamp arrests his co-regent Hugh de Puiset and rules alone as Lord Chancellor, Justiciar, and papal legate.
  - First known foreign scholar commences study at what will become the University of Oxford, Emo of Friesland.
- 1191
  - 12 May – Richard I marries Berengaria of Navarre on Cyprus; she will never visit England during his lifetime.
  - 12 July – Third Crusade: Siege of Acre ends with a crusader victory led by Philip II and Richard I.
  - 7 September – Third Crusade: Richard defeats Saladin at the Battle of Arsuf.
  - October – Prince John of England deposes William Longchamp.
  - 27 November – Reginald fitz Jocelin elected Archbishop of Canterbury but dies before being consecrated.
  - Monks at Glastonbury Abbey claim to have found the tomb of King Arthur and Queen Guinevere.
- 1192
  - 5 August – Third Crusade: Richard defeats Saladin at the Battle of Jaffa.
  - 2 September – Treaty of Jaffa between Richard and Saladin allows Christian pilgrims to visit Jerusalem and ends the Third Crusade. Richard leaves the Holy Land in October.
  - 11 December – returning from the Crusade, Richard is taken prisoner by Leopold V, Duke of Austria, and secured at Dürnstein.
  - Prince John recognised as heir to the throne, and takes control of the royal castles at Windsor and Wallingford.
  - Rebuilding of Lincoln Cathedral begins.
  - Richard of Devizes composes Chronicon de rebus gestis Ricardi Primi.
- 1193
  - 14 February – Richard I is handed to custody of Henry VI, Holy Roman Emperor, and moved to Speyer.
  - 29 May – Hubert Walter enthroned as Archbishop of Canterbury.
  - Strood is given parish status by Gilbert Glanvill, Bishop of Rochester.
- 1194
  - 4 February – Richard I ransomed from captivity.
  - c. 10 February – Henry Marshal is nominated Bishop of Exeter.
  - 12 March–28 March – Richard returns to England and besieges Nottingham Castle to reclaim it from his brother John.
  - 17 April – second coronation of Richard I at Winchester.
  - 2 May – Portsmouth granted a Royal Charter; dock ordered to be built here.
  - 12 May – after settling affairs in England, Richard I leaves for Barfleur in Normandy to reclaim lands lost to Philip II of France.
  - 3 July – Battle of Fréteval: Richard I reconquers his French fiefdoms from Philip II.
  - Hubert Walter appointed as Justiciar.
  - September: Articles of Eyre proclaimed. Hubert Walter establishes the office of coroner.
  - Ordinance of the Jewry: for taxation purposes, records are to be kept of financial transactions. England elects to be served financially by Jews, hence the eponym.
- 1195
  - Treaty of Louviers suspends war between England and France; France takes control of Norman Vexin.
  - Bushmead Priory founded.
  - New stone Lydford Castle built in the Forest of Dartmoor.
- 1196
  - Spring – in London, a popular uprising of the poor against the rich is led by William Fitz Osbert.
- 1197
  - 20 November (or 1196?) – the Assize of Measures establishes standard units of measurement across the country, including the ell as a linear measure, and regulates the production of cloth.
- 1198
  - June – England resumes its war against France, re-occupying Norman Vexin.
  - June 23 – fire at Bury St Edmunds Abbey.
  - September – Battle of Gisors: English victory over the French.
- 1199
  - 13 January – short-lived truce between England and France.
  - 6 April – King Richard I dies of a wound received at the siege of the castle of Châlus in France.
  - 27 May – coronation of King John of England, Richard's brother.
  - Hubert Walter appointed as Lord Chancellor.
  - King Philip II of France renews his war against England, supporting the rival claim to the English throne of Arthur of Brittany.
  - St John's Jerusalem at Sutton-at-Hone, Kent, established as a Commandry of the Knights Hospitaller.
  - St Laurence's Church, Ludlow, is rebuilt.

== Births ==
- 1193
  - William de Ferrers, 5th Earl of Derby (died 1254)
- 1195
  - Roger de Quincy, 2nd Earl of Winchester (died 1265)
- 1197
  - Richard of Chichester, bishop, canonised (died 1253)

== Deaths ==
- 1190
  - 19 November – Baldwin of Exeter, Archbishop of Canterbury
  - Ranulf de Glanvill, chief justiciar
  - Robert de Beaumont, 3rd Earl of Leicester
- 1191
  - 26 December – Reginald fitz Jocelin Archbishop-elect of Canterbury
- 1194
  - Abbas Benedictus, abbot of Peterborough
- 1195
  - Hugh de Puiset, bishop of Durham (born c. 1125)
- 1196
  - William Fitz Osbern, London citizen
- 1197
  - William Longchamp, Lord Chancellor
- 1198
  - William of Newburgh, historian (born c. 1136)
- 1199
  - 6 April – Richard I of England (killed in battle) (born 1157)
  - 4 September – Joan of England, Queen of Sicily, wife of William II of Sicily (born 1165)
- uncertain
  - William Fitzstephen, servant of Thomas Becket and sheriff of Gloucester
