= Champernowne =

Champernowne may refer to:

- Arthur Champernowne (disambiguation), multiple people
- D. G. Champernowne (1912–2000), English economist and mathematician
  - Champernowne constant, in mathematics
  - Champernowne distribution, in statistics
- Joan Champernowne (died 1553), lady-in-waiting at the court of Henry VIII of England
- Katherine Champernowne, maiden name of Kat Ashley, governess and friend of Elizabeth I of England
- Clyst Champernowne, ancient name of Clyst St George, a village in East Devon, England
