= Budockshed =

Historic estate in Devon, England

Budockshed (alias Budshead, Budeokshead, Budokeside etc.) is a historic estate and electoral ward in the parish of St Budeaux, in Plymouth, Devon.

== History ==
It was for fourteen generations the seat of the de Budockshed family which took its name from the estate. It then passed to the Gorges family of Wraxall, in Somerset, near Bristol, and was sold by Sir Arthur Gorges to the Trevill family, wealthy merchants from Plymouth. The mansion house of the Trevills was demolished in the early 19th century, and only ruins survive, namely of a few outer walls and granite arches. Rogers wrote: "The venerable home of the Budocksheds has been destroyed, but two fine old barns - one of grand proportions - and a picturesque granite gateway, still remain to attest its aforetime importance". A monument to the Gorges family survives in St Budeaux Church.

=== De Budockshed ===
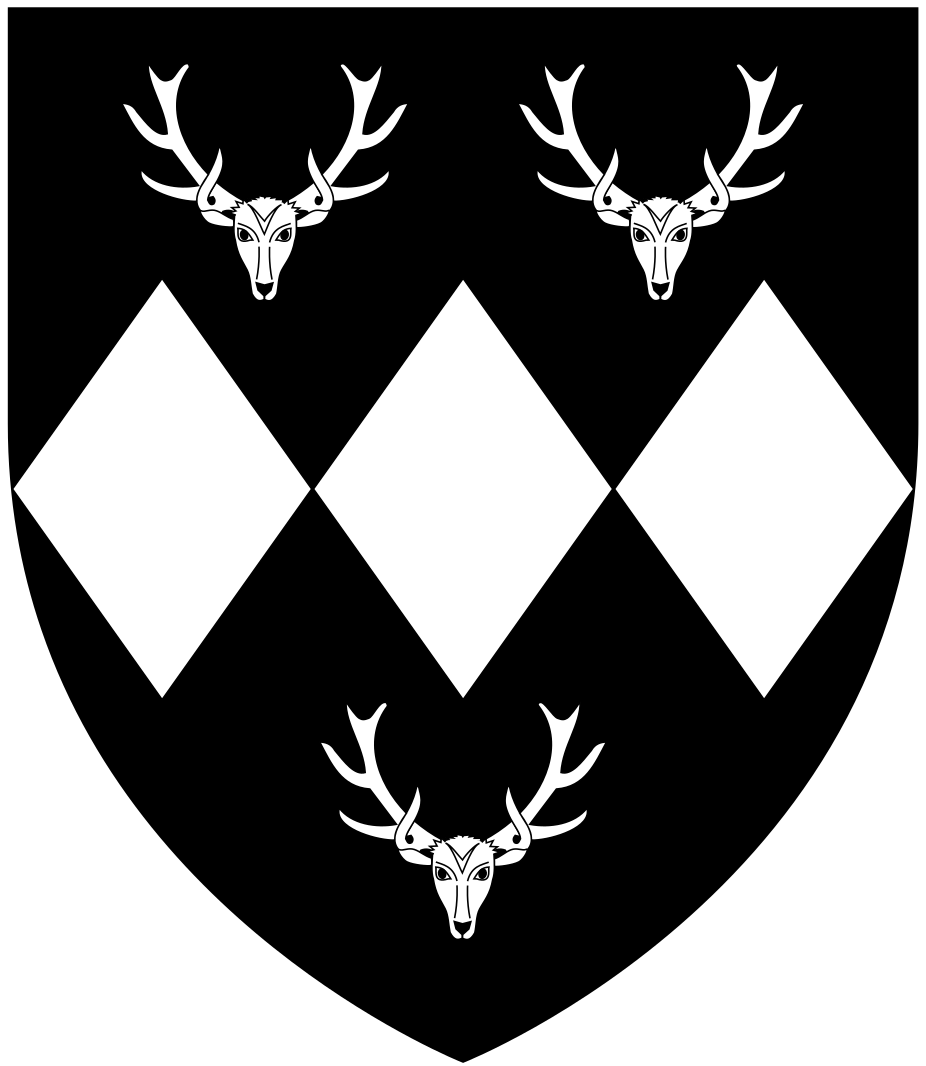
Arms of de Budockshed: Sable, three fusils in fess between three buck's faces argent

The arms of de Budockshed were: Sable, three fusils in fess between three buck's faces argent, with crest: A moor's head affrontée proper, or A stag's head erased argent. The early descent is given by Pole as follows:

- Alan de Budockshed, living at Budockshed in 1242
- Nicholas de Budockshed, successor
- Alan de Budockshed, successor
- William de Budockshed, successor
- Nicholas de Budockshed, successor
- Thomas de Budockshed, who married a certain Elizabeth
- Nicholas de Budockshed, son, who married Cecily Trevalrand, daughter and heiress of Henry Trevalrand (alias Morton), by whom he had two sons, including Walter de Budockshed (whom Pole states to have been ancestor of the Basset family of Devonshire, which does not agree with the Heraldic Visitations of Devon)
- William de Budockshed, son and heir, who married Jone Prous, daughter and heiress of Richard Prous of Chagford in Devon. According to the Heraldic Visitations of Devon, his younger son was Walter de Budockshed, whose granddaughter Elizabeth de Budockshed married Sir John Basset of Tehidy in Cornwall, of the Basset family of Devonshire and Cornwall.
- Thomas de Budockshed, son, who married Jone Trencrek, daughter and heiress of John Trencrek of Trenhall
- Robert de Budockshed, son, who married Anne Pomeroy, daughter of Sir Thomas Pomeroy (died 1446), feudal baron of Berry Pomeroy in Devon, Sheriff of Devon in 1427
- Thomas de Budockshed, son, who married Margaret Halwell, daughter of Sir John Halwell
- Anthony de Budockshed, son, who married Elizabeth Strode, daughter of William Strode of Parham in Dorset, a junior branch of the Strode family of Newnham in Devon
- Roger Budockshed (died 1576/7), son, who married Frances Champernowne, third daughter of Sir Philip Champernowne (c. 1479–1545) of Modbury, Sheriff of Devon in 1527. Her elder sister Joan Champernowne was the wife of Sir Anthony Denny, Groom of the Stool to King Henry VIII and her brother John Champernowne was married to Katherine Blount, a daughter of the courtier William Blount, 4th Baron Mountjoy (c. 1478 – 1534), KG, one of the wealthiest English nobles of his time. Roger Budockshed left surviving children: one son, Phillip Budockshed, and three daughters.
- Phillip Budockshed (died 1570), son, who having married Margery Smith, daughter of Robert Smith of Tregonyke in Cornwall, died without children, leaving his three surviving sisters as co-heiresses:
  - Wenefride Budockshed, wife of Sir William Gorges (died 1538), whose share of her paternal inheritance was Budockshed
  - Elizabeth Budockshed, wife of John Amidas of Plymouth
  - Agnes Budockshed, wife of Oliver Hill of Shilston

=== Gorges ===
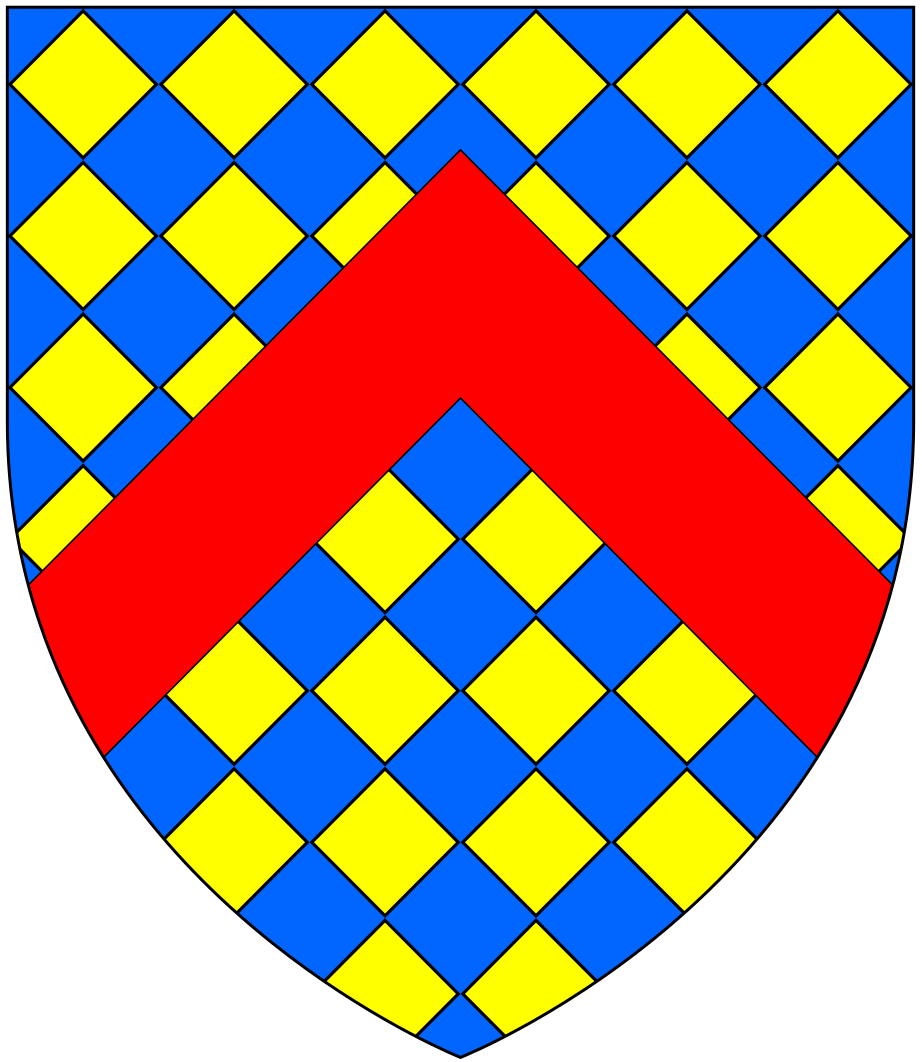
Arms of Gorges (modern): Lozengy or and azure, a chevron gules. These arms resulted from the famous 1347 heraldry case of Warbelton v Gorges.

- Sir William Gorges (died 1538), who married Winifred Budockshed, heiress of Budockshed. He was a Vice-Admiral, Deputy of Ireland, and a Gentleman Pensioner of Queen Elizabeth, a member of the Gorges family of Wraxall in Somerset, which was in fact the Russell family, descended in the male line from the Russell family of Dyrham in Gloucestershire and Kingston Russell in Dorset, but which adopted the surname Gorges in compliance with a maternal inheritance. The matter is explained in the important 14th-century heraldic case of Warbelton v Gorges. By Winifred he had three sons:
  - Tristram Gorges;
  - Sir Arthur Gorges (c. 1569 – 1625);
  - Sir Edward Gorges;
- Tristram Gorges, son and heir of his mother, from whom he inherited Budockshed, married Elizabeth Cole, daughter of Martin Cole of Cole-Anger, by whom he had four daughters (two of whom married Courtenays of the Landrake descent, and another Trelawney) and one son.
- William Gorges, son and heir, who died childless. He disinherited his sisters and bequeathed Budockshed to his uncle Sir Arthur Gorges.
- Sir Arthur Gorges (c. 1569 – 1625), uncle, of Chelsea in Middlesex, who sold the estate to the Trevill family of Plymouth, prosperous merchants.

==== Gorges monument, St Budeaux ====
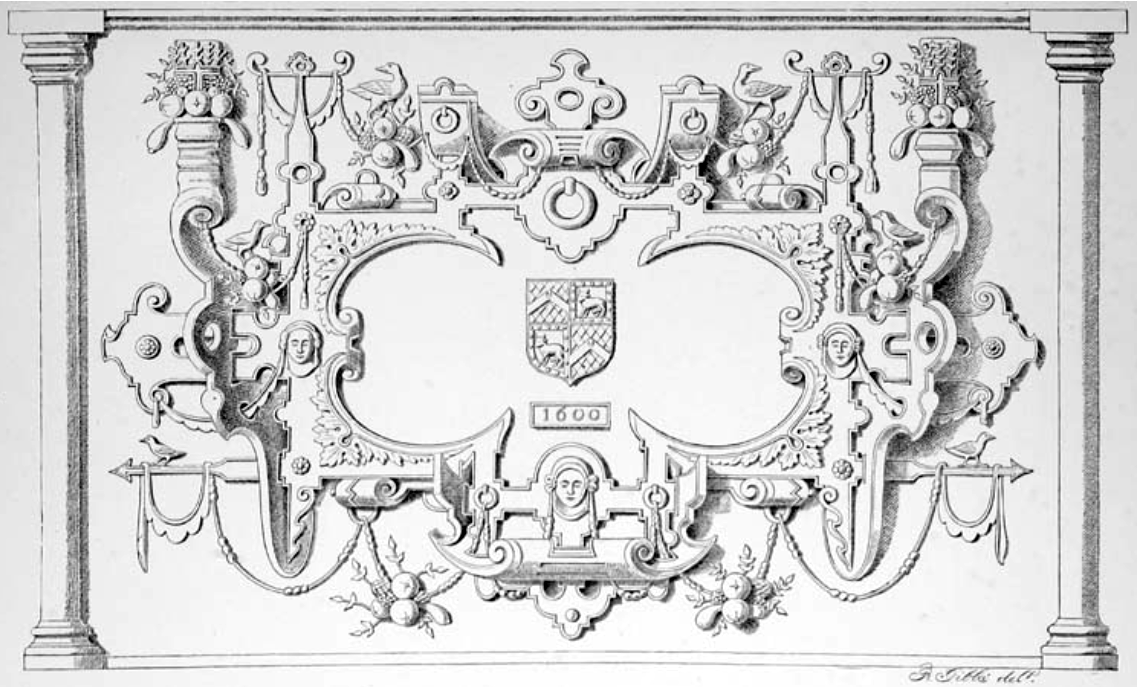
1890 drawing of strapwork reredos of the Gorges monument in St Budeaux Church, with arms of Gorges quartering Cole

In St Budeaux Church survives a beautiful monument to the Gorges family, a high altar tomb situated in the Budockshed Aisle, at the east end of the north aisle, with pillars at the angles, the cover-stone of slate finely carved, with a reredos of exquisite Elizabethan strapwork design. The slate slab and front and sides of the altar tomb displays coats of arms as follows: 1: Sable, three fusils in fess between three stags' faces argent; Crest: A moor's head affrontée proper (Budockshed); 2: Quarterly, 1 and 4: Lozengy or and azure, a chevron gules, a crescent for difference (Gorges); 2 and 3: Argent, a bull passant sable within a bordure of the second bezantée (Cole); 3: Gorges, with crest: A greyhound's head couped at the shoulders and collared with crescent for difference; 4: Gorges and Budockshed quarterly; 5: Budockshed, with crest. The original inscription, which was probably gilded on it, had disappeared, but the sculptured date, 1600, remains. The monument had become greatly dilapidated, but was restored in 1881, with the following inscription:

"Roger Budockshead of Budockshead Esquire ob: 1576; Sir William Gorges Kn: ob: 1583; Dame Winifred Gorges, ob: 1599; Tristram Gorges of Budockshead Esq: ob: 1607; Mrs. Elizabeth Gorges ob: 1607; Restored 1881 chiefly at the expense of the Historical Society and Citizens of the state of Maine, U.S.A., in memory of Sir Ferdinando Gorges the first Proprietor and Governor of that Province. A.D. 1635, aided by some connections of the Gorges family in England".

=== Trevill ===
In the Budockshed aisle of St Budeaux Church is a monument to the Trevill family inscribed as follows:

"Here Lyeth Bvried the Body of Richard Trevill, Esqr., who died Avgvst the XXVI., 1648. Aged 73. Here Lyeth Bvried the Bodyes of Richard Trevill, Esqr., Nephew and Heire of the Aforesaid Richard, who died April the 4th, 1662. Aged 51. And also of Mary his Wife, who died the XXV. day of Febrvary, 1663. Aged 57. Here Lyeth Bvried the Body of Richard Trevill, Esq., Sonn of the said Richard and Mary, who died Janvary the XIX. 1665. Aged 19. This Monvment was Erected by William Trevill, of Bvtshead, Esq., in the year of ovr Lord 1667, to Perpetuate ye memorie of his Worshipfull Predecessors and Relations here buried.

The Trevill family is memorialised by a street name in Plymouth. In St Budeaux Church, below an elaborate monument to earlier members of the Trevill family, is a ledger stone inscribed as follows:

"Also Here Lyeth The Body of William Trevill of Butshead, Esq., Father of Lethbridge Trevill, who departed this Life the 18th Day of May, 1680. Also Here Lyeth the Body of Lethbridge Trevill, Son of William Trevill of Butshead, Esq., who departed this Life 27th of February, 1699".
