= English ship Delight (1583) =

History
- Name: Delight
- Owner: England
- Port of registry: England
- Out of service: 29 August 1583
- Fate: Ran aground and sank in sandbar or shoal off Sable Island

General characteristics
- Type: Sailing ship
- Tonnage: 120 GRT
- Propulsion: Sail
- Crew: 101
- Notes: Also known as George, Flagship of Admiral Sir Humphrey Gilbert's expedition.

Delight was an English sailing ship that ran aground off Sable Island, while she was on Sir Humphrey Gilbert's expedition with Squirrel to Newfoundland in North America.

== Expedition to Newfoundland and sinking ==
Delight and Squirrel left England in 1583 to take part in Sir Humphrey Gilbert's expedition to Newfoundland.

After reaching Sable Island Delight's captain Richard Clarke had a dispute with Sir Humphrey Gilbert to provide a safe passage near the island, but eventually captain Clarke followed Sir Gilbert's orders to pass close to the island.

At 7 am on 29 August 1583 Delight sank after running aground on one of Sable Island's sandbars. Captain Clarke quickly led 16 men to a small lifeboat (which had only one oar) and rowed clear of the fast sinking ship. Delight sank to a depth of 10 metres (33 ft) and took 85 men (including Stephanus Parmenius) and most of the expedition's supplies with her. The water was too shallow for Gilbert's frigate (Squirrel) to offer any assistance.

The 17 men in the lifeboat spent seven days at sea before they finally reached Newfoundland. They were rescued by a barque whaling vessel after spending five days in Newfoundland.

The wreck was one of many on Gilbert's expedition which ended up with Gilbert himself being drowned in a later wreck (the one of Squirrel). The disaster contributed to the temporary abandonment of the English settlement in Newfoundland.

Delight is the first recorded shipwreck off Sable Island.

== Wreck ==
The wreck lies approximately 10 metres deep near Sable Island.
