= Becoming Elizabeth =

Historical drama television series about Queen Elizabeth I

- Genre: Drama; Historical fiction
- Created by: Anya Reiss
- Written by: Anya Reiss; Anna Jordan; Emily Ballou
- Starring: Alicia von Rittberg
- Composer: Tim Phillips
- Country of origin: United Kingdom
- Original language: English
- No. of seasons: 1
- No. of episodes: 8

Production
- Executive producers: George Ormond; George Faber; Anya Reiss
- Producer: Lisa Osborne
- Cinematography: Adolpho Veloso
- Production company: The Forge

Original release
- Network: Starz
- Release: 12 June – 7 August 2022

Becoming Elizabeth is a historical drama television series, created by Anya Reiss, that charts Elizabeth I's early years. Airing on Starz on 12 June 2022 and Channel 4 on 15 June, on 2 October 2022, the series was cancelled at the end of season 1.

== Plot ==
The series follows the younger years of the only surviving child of Anne Boleyn and Henry VIII, Queen Elizabeth I, who starts out in the story as an orphaned teenager who becomes embroiled in the politics of the English court on her journey towards the crown. Before cancellation, the series covered almost the full reign of her younger half brother, Edward VI.

== Cast and characters ==
- Alicia von Rittberg as Lady Elizabeth Tudor
- Romola Garai as Lady Mary Tudor
- Jessica Raine as Catherine Parr
- Tom Cullen as Thomas Seymour
- Bella Ramsey as Lady Jane Grey
- Jamie Parker as John Dudley, 1st Duke of Northumberland
- Oliver Zetterström as King Edward VI
- John Heffernan as Edward Seymour, 1st Duke of Somerset
- Jamie Blackley as Lord Robert Dudley
- Jacob Avery as Lord Guildford Dudley
- Alexandra Gilbreath as Kat Ashley
- Leo Bill as Henry Grey, 1st Duke of Suffolk
- Ekow Quartey as Pedro
- Alex Macqueen as Stephen Gardiner
- Olivier Huband as Ambassador Guzman
- Robert Whitelock as Robert Kett
- Ruby Ashbourne Serkis as Lady Amy Dudley
- Stanley Townsend as Sir Anthony Denny
- Beth Goddard as Lady Joan Denny

== Episodes ==
No.	Title	Directed by	Written by	Original release date	U.S. viewers (millions)
1	"Keep Your Knife Bright"	Justin Chadwick	Anya Reiss	June 12, 2022	0.158
The death of Henry VIII leaves England in turmoil. His three children Mary, Elizabeth, and Edward are told and Edward is proclaimed king as Edward VI of England. Edward begins his reign with his uncle and Lord Protector, Edward Seymour, Duke of Somerset by his side. Henry's widow Catherine Parr marries Thomas Seymour. Elizabeth and her cousin Lady Jane Grey move into Catherine's Chelsea residence as the wards of Catherine and Thomas. Fourteen-year-old Elizabeth becomes infatuated with the much older Thomas, who indulges and preys upon her.
2	"You Cannot Keep The Birds From Flying Over Your Head"	Justin Chadwick	Anya Reiss	June 19, 2022	0.156
A suggestive court performance mocking Catholicism and the Pope upsets devout Mary. The strong sense of anti-Catholicism continues to mount at court. Mary warns Elizabeth about Catherine Parr and suggests that Elizabeth live with her. Edward begs Mary to convert to Protestantism, which she refuses to do. Elizabeth is torn between her siblings. Elizabeth and Thomas Seymour's relationship grows more intimate. Thomas and Edward Seymour are in conflict. Mary asks for Elizabeth's support for her religious liberty, which Elizabeth refuses.
3	"Either Learn Or Be Silent"	Justin Chadwick	Anya Reiss	June 26, 2022	0.140
To her dismay, Catherine Parr learns that she is pregnant. The Catholic Bishop of Winchester Stephen Gardiner is released from the Tower of London and appointed to the privy council in an attempt to appease Mary, as a result of Elizabeth's letter to Mary refusing to side with her. Thomas and Catherine plan a spectacular birthday party for Elizabeth, in order to bring Edward to their home and take forward the plan to marry their ward Lady Jane Grey to the king. The party backfires after Elizabeth learns the true intention behind the event, and sabotages the evening. With the support of Catherine and Thomas, King Edward tries to assert himself against Lord Protector Somerset, but fails. Catherine discovers Elizabeth and Thomas's relationship, and sends Elizabeth away from Chelsea Manor.
4	"Lighten Our Darkness"	Justin Chadwick	Anya Reiss	July 3, 2022	0.128
Now living at the house of courtier Sir Anthony Denny, brother-in-law of her governess Kat Ashley, Elizabeth attempts to move on from what happened at Chelsea. A Catholic church is ransacked and the priest assaulted as religious turmoil escalates. Elizabeth is noticeably absent from court. She is fearful that she is pregnant, but this turns out to be a false alarm. She is visited by both Mary and her friend Robert Dudley. Mary attempts to reconcile with King Edward; they watch a cockfight together at court. Rumours fly about Elizabeth and Thomas Seymour. Catherine gives birth to a daughter, but soon afterwards dies of childbed fever. Chelsea Manor reverts to the Crown and is assigned to Elizabeth, who moves in with her household. Thomas goes to stay with his brother Edward Seymour. Elizabeth returns to court and pledges loyalty to her brother. At the same time, Mary holds a Catholic requiem mass for Catherine. Thomas suddenly suggests to Elizabeth that she should marry him.
5	"Necessity Compels Me To Plague You"	Udayan Prasad	Anna Jordan	July 10, 2022	0.114
Widowed Thomas Seymour pines after Elizabeth and seeks her hand in marriage. Lord Protector Edward Seymour organises a secret deal with the French ambassador without the king's knowledge; this is eventually discovered and angers the king and council. Elizabeth agrees to marry Thomas if they obtain Edward Seymour's permission, but Edward refuses to give this. Next, Edward Seymour proposes to Elizabeth that she marry a royal man such as Eric XIV of Sweden or Otto Henry, Elector Palatine to, moreover, establish a foreign alliance. In retaliation, Thomas Seymour makes a failed attempt to kidnap the king. Thomas is detained, while Elizabeth is implicated and presented with a warrant for her arrest.
6	"What Cannot Be Cured"	Udayan Prasad	Emily Ballou	July 17, 2022	0.151
Elizabeth is held under house arrest following Thomas Seymour's capture, and is interrogated by John Dudley. Dudley and his sons are then sent by the Lord Protector to put down a peasant rebellion in Norfolk. While doing so, the Dudleys stay with the Robsart family and Robert Dudley takes a liking to the family's daughter Amy. Council members pressure a conflicted Edward Seymour to countersign Thomas's death warrant, and Thomas is beheaded. Fed up with Seymour's orders, John Dudley disobeys him by executing peasant leader Robert Kett and other rebellious peasants. On returning to court, he seizes power as the new Lord Protector, ending covert attempts by some council members to install Lady Mary as the new Lord Protector.
7	"To Laugh, To Lie, To Flatter, To Face"	Catherine Morshead	Anya Reiss	July 31, 2022	0.100
Protestant marriages to make foreign alliances are proposed for both Elizabeth and Mary, and the court prepares for the arrival of the Danish prince Frederick II of Denmark for whom Elizabeth is intended. The new Lord Protector John Dudley proves himself to be both brutal and cunning, making Mary's attempts to practise Catholicism more difficult. The Spanish ambassador attempts to convince Mary to flee to Spain. Elizabeth is confronted with Robert Dudley's romantic feelings. The young king Edward shows signs of illness.
8	"To Death We Must Stoop"	Catherine Morshead	Anya Reiss	August 7, 2022	0.140
Two months pass and Edward's illness worsens. Mary arrives at court; in anticipation of Edward's death, the council and the two princesses attempt to strip John Dudley of his power. Robert Dudley is revealed to have married Amy Robsart, shocking both his father and Elizabeth. The king's sudden recovery astounds the court, and the threat to Lord Protector Dudley's power is removed. Edward Seymour is beheaded, having taken part in the failed coup. Edward is told by Dudley that both his sisters have been disloyal, and he bans them from court. The king is reminded of another possible heir to the throne (his cousin Lady Jane Grey) as he vomits blood again.

== Production ==
=== Development ===
In December 2019, it was announced Starz had greenlit an 8-episode series focusing on the younger years of Queen Elizabeth I created by Anya Reiss, who would also serve as an executive producer. In October 2022, it was announced that Starz had cancelled the show and there would be no season 2 covering the reign of Mary I.

=== Casting ===
In October 2020, Alicia von Rittberg joined the cast of the series. In May 2021, Romola Garai, Jessica Raine, Tom Cullen, Bella Ramsey, Oliver Zetterström, John Heffernan, Jamie Blackley, Jacob Avery, Alexandra Gilbreath, Leo Bill, Ekow Quartey, Alex Macqueen and Oliver Huband joined the cast of the series.

=== Filming ===
Principal photography began in December 2020. In March 2021, production took place at Cardiff Castle.

== Reception ==
On the review aggregator website Rotten Tomatoes, 88% of 16 critics' reviews are positive, with an average rating of 6.9/10. The website's consensus reads, "Angsty as a disgruntled teenager and all the better for it, Becoming Elizabeth finds fresh drama in the Tudors by shifting focus onto the royal court's web of spiders.". Particular praise was given to Romola Garai in her role as Mary Tudor, with many commentating that she stole the show. Metacritic, which uses a weighted average, assigned a score of 73 out of 100 based on 11 critics, indicating "generally favorable reviews". Ramsey in playing this version of Lady Jane Grey "imbues the malleable noblewoman with as much ambivalence as she does wit and cunning."

The series was repeated in the UK on Channel 4 from 15 July 2023.
