= Edward Denny (soldier) =

English soldier, privateer and adventurer

Member of Parliament for Tregony
- In office 1597

High Sheriff of Kerry
- In office 1588

Member of Parliament for Liskeard in Cornwall
- In office 1584-1585

Personal details
- Born: 1547 Cheshunt, Hertfordshire, England
- Died: 12 February 1600 (aged 52)
- Spouse: Margaret Edgcumbe (m. 1583)
- Children: 11
- Parents: Sir Anthony Denny (father); Joan Champernowne (mother)
- Relatives: Edward Denny (nephew); Edmund Denny (grandfather)
- Military career
- Allegiance: King Edward VI
- Conflicts: Second Desmond Rebellion; Siege of Smerwick; Nine Years' War

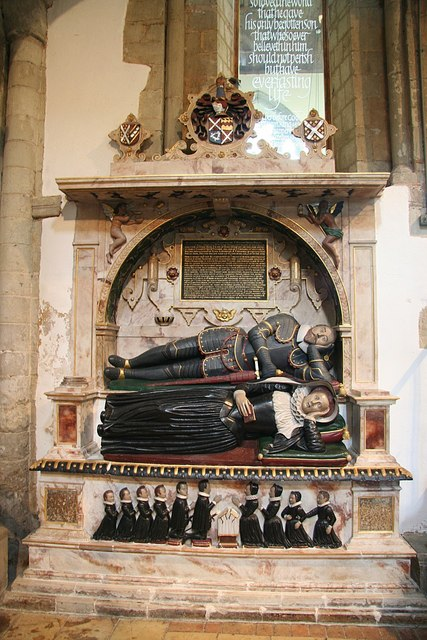
Monument in Waltham Abbey, Essex, to Sir Edward Denny and his wife Margaret Edgcumbe, with "weepers" depicting their seven sons and three daughters

Arms of Denny: Gules, a saltire argent between twelve crosses pattée or

Sir Edward Denny (1547 – 12 February 1600), Knight Banneret, of Bishop's Stortford in Hertfordshire, was a soldier, privateer and adventurer during the reign of Queen Elizabeth I.

== Origins ==
He was born in Cheshunt, Hertfordshire in 1547, the second surviving son of Sir Anthony Denny, a Privy Councillor to King Henry VIII and one of the Guardians of his young son and successor King Edward VI. His nephew was Edward Denny, 1st Earl of Norwich (1569-1637), who died without male issue and was buried at Waltham Abbey in Essex.

== Career ==
Orphaned in childhood, he inherited lands in Hertfordshire. After some minor appointments at court, in 1573 he went to Ulster on a military expedition led by Walter Devereux, 1st Earl of Essex. Denny then took up privateering, capturing a Spanish ship in 1577 and a Flemish one in 1578. The same year saw him join a colonizing expedition led by Sir Humphrey Gilbert and Walter Raleigh; however, their ships were forced to turn home due to bad weather.

== Ireland ==
Denny and his cousin Raleigh were then sent to Ireland to help put down the Second Desmond Rebellion. Denny led a company at the infamous Siege of Smerwick, when 400 Spanish and Italian troops were beheaded by the English after surrendering. In 1581 he commanded another expedition to Ireland and returned with the head of Garret O’Toole, leader of one of the Irish clans.

== High Sheriff, Knight and MP ==
Denny first became a Member of Parliament for Liskeard in Cornwall for the 1584 to 1585 parliament. He was granted lands at Tralee, confiscated from the Earl of Desmond; he both became High Sheriff of Kerry and was knighted in 1588. His estates in Ireland were a financial failure and in 1591 he returned to England to command a naval expedition to the Azores. It has not been established whether it was this Sir Edward Denny or his nephew and namesake who was elected Knight of the Shire for Westmorland in 1593, however it is certain that in 1597 he was returned to Parliament for the "rotten borough" of Tregony in Cornwall. In 1597 he was Vice-Constable of Castle Maine.

The following year he returned to Ireland during the Nine Years' War, to find that the confiscated land he had been granted had been ransacked. Disgruntled by the lack of rewards for his service to the Crown, Denny allied himself to Robert Devereux, 2nd Earl of Essex. Late in 1599 or early in 1600, Denny "took a deadly sickness in his country’s service". He died on 12 February 1600 at the age of 52.

== Marriage & issue ==
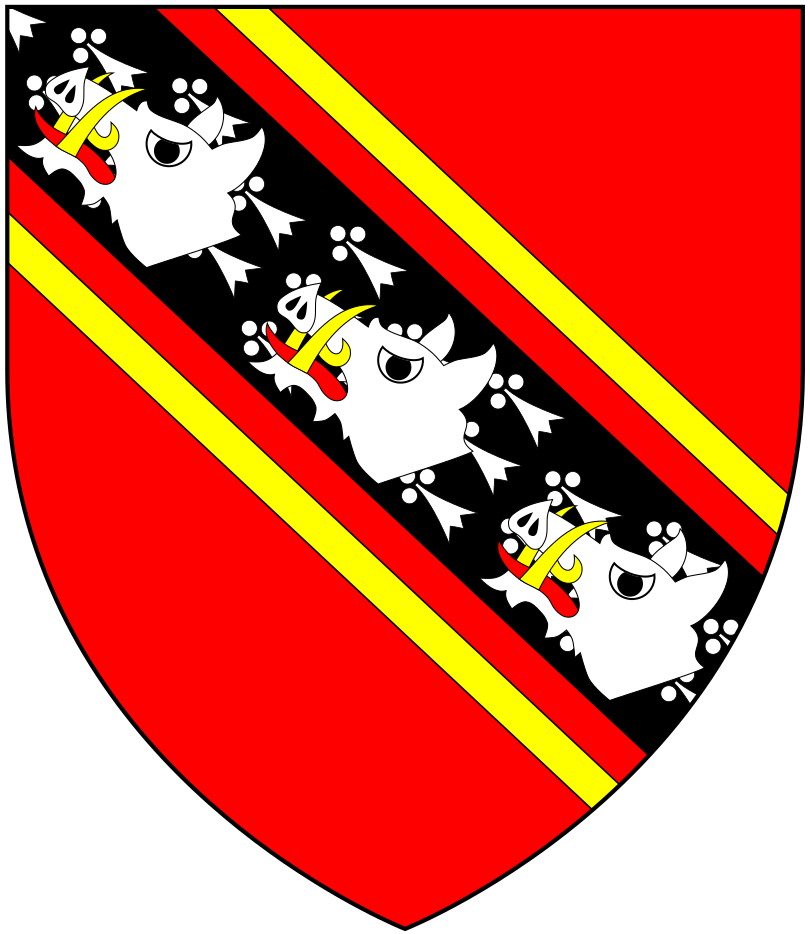
Arms of Edgcumbe: Gules, on a bend ermines cotised or three boar's heads couped argent, as seen (inverted) on the monument to Sir Edward Denny in Waltham Abbey

In 1583 he married Margaret Edgcumbe (d.1648), one of the queen's maids of honour whom he had met at court in 1581, a daughter of Piers Edgcumbe (1536-1608) of Mount Edgcumbe and of Cotehele in the parish of Calstock, both in Cornwall, a Member of Parliament. Margaret survived her husband and having died in 1648 was buried in St Michael's Church, Bishop's Stortford. By his wife he had issue including:

- Sir Edward Denny, eldest son and heir, who founded the Denny family of Tralee Castle in County Kerry, Ireland. His descendant was Sir Barry Denny, 1st Baronet (c. 1744–1794) of Castle Moyle, created a baronet in 1782;
- Arthur Denny (1584 – 4 Jul 1619), who married Mary or Elizabeth Forrest of Morborne in 1604.
- Francis Denny
- Henry Denny (1595–1658)
- Anthony Denny (died young)
- Anthony Denny (1592–1662)
- Thomas Denny
- Charles Denny (d. 29 Dec 1635)
- Elizabeth Denny (b. 1586)
- Honora Denny (died young)
- Marie Denny (d. 29 Nov 1678)

== Death & burial ==
He died on 12 February 1600 at the age of 52 and was buried in his family's vault in the churchyard of Waltham Abbey Church in Essex, in which church survives his monument with the recumbent effigies of himself and his wife. Situated beside the high altar it depicts Denny lying on his side in a suit of armour, next to his wife; on a separate frieze below are sculpted his ten children, kneeling.

His epitaph reads:

′Learn, curious reader, ere you pass,
What Sir Edward Denny was:
A courtier in the chamber,
A soldier in the field,
Whose tongue could never flatter,
Whose heart could never yield.′
