= Stephanus Parmenius =

- Born: c. 1555; Buda, Budin Eyalet, Ottoman Empire (today Hungary)
- Died: 29 August 1583; Sable Island, Atlantic Ocean
- Cause of death: shipwreck
- Other name: Budai Parmenius István
- Education: Heidelberg University; University of Oxford
- Known for: Humanist poet

Stephanus Parmenius (Hungarian: Budai Parmenius István; c. 1555 – 29 August 1583) was a Hungarian scholar and humanist poet who traveled to Oxford and became involved in the English exploration of the New World. He joined Humphrey Gilbert's expedition to North America with the intention of writing a chronicle of the voyage and its discoveries. Parmenius reached Newfoundland, likely becoming the first Hungarian in the New World. However, he died on the return voyage in 1583 when his ship was lost at sea.

== Biography ==
Parmenius was probably born sometime between 1555 and 1560 in Buda which had been under Ottoman rule since 1541. His parents are not known, but he was raised as a Protestant, possibly a Calvinist, and received a privileged classical education in Hungary. In 1579 he was sent on a tour of European universities to complete his education. He went first to Heidelberg University and studied there for two years.

In 1581 he traveled to England where he came under the patronage of Henry Unton. He settled in Oxford where he befriended the president of Magdalen College, Laurence Humfrey and lodged with Richard Hakluyt at Christ Church. In 1582 he wrote his first Latin poem, Paean or "Thanksgiving Hymn", dedicated to Unton and printed by Thomas Vautrollier.

At this time Hakluyt was working closely with Humphrey Gilbert to plan a voyage of exploration and settlement in North America. Hakluyt introduced Parmenius to Gilbert who must have been favorably impressed with the young Hungarian. Parmenius was excited by the proposed expedition and wrote another long Latin poem, De Navigatione which honored English explorers and hailed Gilbert's plans to found a colony in the New World. Gilbert arranged to have the poem published and paid part of the printing costs.

As preparations for Gilbert's voyage proceeded, Parmenius took the opportunity to join the expedition and serve as chronicler of the enterprise. On 11 June 1583 they set sail from Plymouth with a fleet of five ships. Parmenius was aboard the Swallow, a small frigate that had been engaged in piracy and was subsequently seized by Gilbert and pressed into his service.

The outward voyage took longer than expected and supplies ran low. Finally, the ships reached landfall at St. John’s harbor, Newfoundland, on 3 August 1583. They were not the first Europeans to reach the site—the harbor was a seasonal camp for the fishing vessels from England, Portugal, France and Spain. The expedition remained there for a couple weeks, levying supplies from the fishing camp and exploring the countryside. Parmenius was not overly impressed with his first experience in the New World. In a letter to Hakluyt, he wrote of the impenetrable pine forests, the weather, and his disappointment at not meeting any native peoples. He expressed the hope that the country would improve as they traveled further south along the coast.

On August 20 they set sail again with plans to explore further south. Parmenius switched ships and joined the crew on the Delight. On August 29 his ship encountered shallow waters, went aground and quickly broke up in bad weather off the coast of Sable Island. Some crew members survived but Parmenius was drowned.

A companion who survived, Edward Hayes, paid tribute to Parmenius with these words: "Amongst whom was drowned a learned man, an Hungarian, borne in the citie of Buda, called thereof Budaeus, who of pietie and zeale to good attempts, adventured in this action, minding to record in the Latin tongue, the gests and things of our nation, the same being adorned with the eloquent stile of this Orator, and rare Poet of our time."

The one surviving letter from Parmenius was included by Hakluyt in the second edition of The Principal Navigations (1600).
