= English ship Squirrel (1570s) =

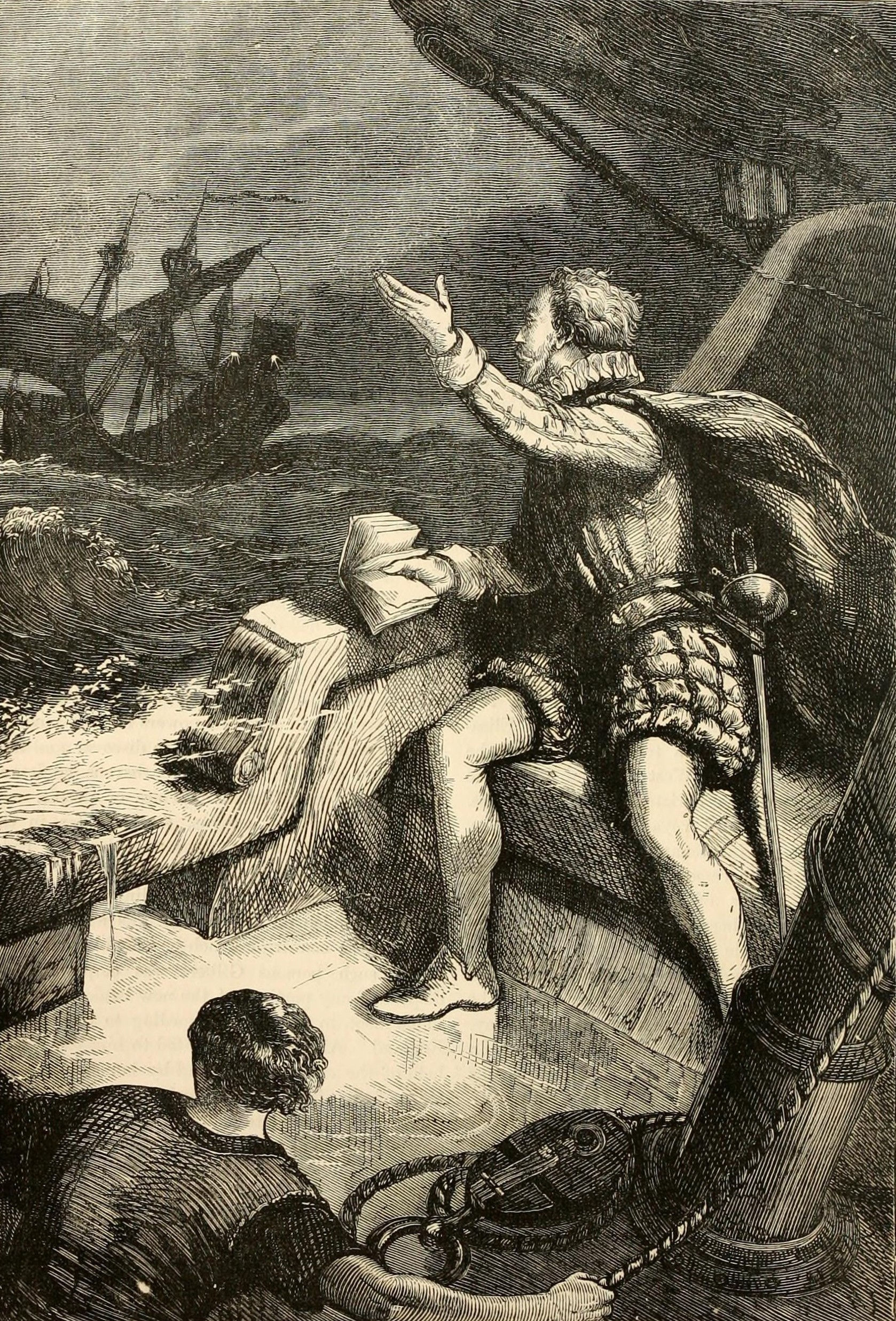
- The Last Moments of Sir Humphrey Gilbert (illustration of the sinking of Squirrel, c. 1874)

History

England
- Name: Squirrel
- Fate: Lost with all hands on 9 September 1583 in a storm near the Azores

General characteristics
- Tons burthen: 10
- Complement: 10

Squirrel was an exploration vessel launched in the 1570s and lost with all hands in 1583.

In the 1570s Squirrel made a return voyage from England to Narragansett Bay, piloted by Simon Fernandes. The voyage was considered remarkable given her small size and the dangers of sailing in largely uncharted waters.

She was one of a small fleet of vessels under the command of Sir Humphrey Gilbert, commissioned in 1579 by the lord deputy of Ireland, William Drury, to attack James FitzMaurice FitzGerald by sea and to intercept a fleet expected to arrive from Spain. The expedition was a failure with the fleet dispersed by heavy seas and forced to seek shelter at Land's End.

Squirrel was again under Gilbert's command in 1583 for a voyage to Newfoundland and the eastern coast of North America. Departing England in June in company with four other vessels, she made an uneventful crossing of the Atlantic and reached the Newfoundland coast on 5 August. Gilbert went ashore at St John's to claim the area as England's first overseas colony under Royal Charter of Queen Elizabeth I. Plans for a further expedition south along the American coastline were abandoned following a critical shortage of supplies, and Gilbert elected instead to return to England. Squirrel was selected as the flagship for this return voyage and was armed with some small cannon, in Gilbert's words "more to give a show [of force] than with judgement to foresee unto the safety of her and the men."

The frigate [Squirrel] was near cast away, oppressed by waves, yet at that time recovered: and giving forth signs of joy the General, sitting abaft with a book in his hand, cried out unto us in the Hind, so oft as we did approach within hearing, "We are as near to Heaven by sea as by land."

At twelve o'clock that night the Squirrel's lights suddenly disappeared, and she was seen no more.

— Captain Edward Hayes, Golden Hind
9 September 1583.

On 9 September Squirrel had reached the Azores off the European coast when she ran into a storm and was lost with all hands. News of her fate was carried to England by the crew of Golden Hind, another vessel in Gilbert's fleet and the only one to survive the return voyage.
