= Simon Fernandes =

Portuguese explorer

Simão Fernandes
- Born: c. 1538; Terceira, Kingdom of Portugal
- Died: c. 1590 (aged c. 52) unknown, possibly around the Azores
- Piratical career
- Nickname: The Swine
- Allegiance: Spain (until c. 1570s); England (since 1578)
- Years active: 1570s – c. 1590
- Rank: Captain
- Base of operations: South Wales, England
- Battles: Spanish Armada
- Later work: Piloted Sir Walter Raleigh's failed 1587 expedition to Roanoke island, "The Lost Colony"

Simão Fernandes (c. 1538 – c. 1590), known in English as Simon Fernandes or Simon Ferdinando, was a 16th-century Portuguese-born navigator and sometimes pirate who piloted the 1585 and 1587 English expeditions to found colonies on Roanoke island, part of modern-day North Carolina but then known as Virginia. Fernandes trained as a navigator in Spain at the famed Casa de Contratación in Seville, but later took up arms against the Spanish empire, preying upon Spanish shipping along with fellow pirate John Callis. Charged with piracy in 1577, he was saved from the hangman's noose by Sir Francis Walsingham, becoming a Protestant and a subject of the Queen of England. In 1578 Fernandes entered the service of Sir Humphrey Gilbert and later Sir Walter Raleigh, piloting the failed 1587 expedition to Roanoke, known to history as the "Lost Colony".

Fernandes disappears from the records after 1590, when he sailed with an English fleet to the Azores, a journey from which he most likely did not return alive. However, a copy of one of his charts of the East coast of North America still survives in the Cotton Collection, and was probably one of the chief sources used by John Dee for his 1580 map justifying English claims to North America.

== Early life ==
Fernandes was born around 1538 in the Portuguese island of Terceira in the Azores.

He received his navigational training in Spain, at the renowned Casa de Contratación pilot training school in Seville, and made at least one journey across the Atlantic in the service of the Spanish Crown.

== Career ==
=== Pirate ===
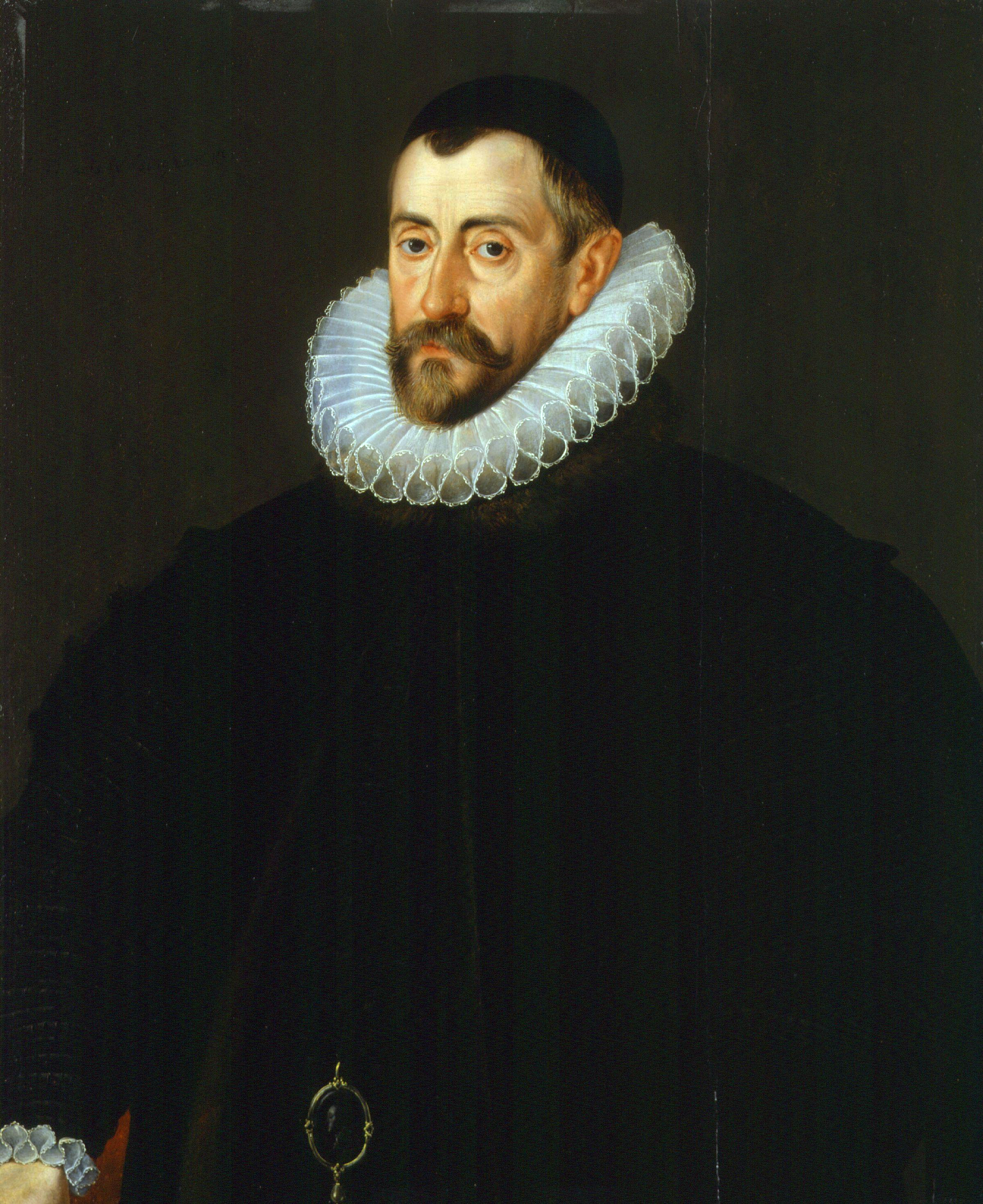
Sir Francis Walsingham saved Fernandes from the hangman's noose.

At some point Fernandes severed his loyalty to the Spanish crown and in the 1570s he took up a career in piracy, operating out of South Wales in association with the notorious pirate John Callis, preying upon Spanish shipping. England was at peace with Spain at this time and piracy was an offence punishable by hanging, but in practice Fernandes was engaged in exactly the sort of behaviour to which Queen Elizabeth I was inclined to turn a blind eye. However, the Portuguese ambassador Francisco Giraldi vigorously protested Fernandes's activities to the Queen's ministers, after the alleged murder of seven Portuguese sailors, and in 1577 the 39-year-old Fernandes was arrested in Cardiff and taken to London to face trial.

However, far from being hanged for his crimes, Fernandes was released, apparently with the connivance of Queen Elizabeth's spymaster Sir Francis Walsingham, who appears to have been well aware of the Portuguese navigator's potential usefulness in challenging the Spanish trade monopoly in the New World. Certainly Giraldi blamed Walsingham, excoriating him and demanding justice for his country's dead sailors. The fact was that Fernandes likely had more experience of navigating the Indies than almost any man in England, making him a unique asset to the early English voyages of discovery in the New World.

=== Navigator ===
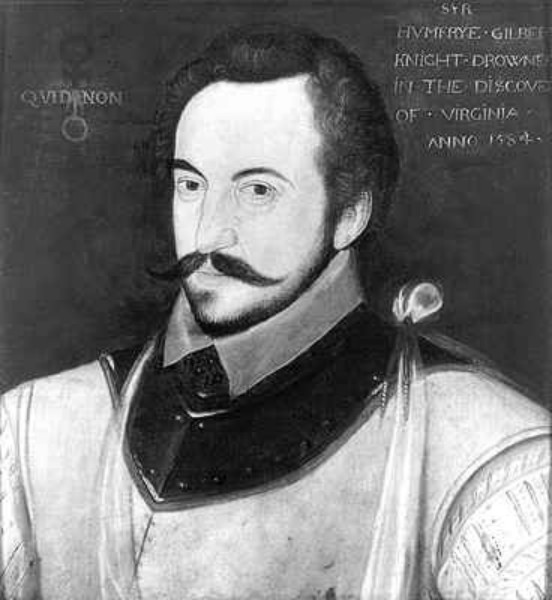
Fernandes' patron, Sir Humphrey Gilbert, c. 1583

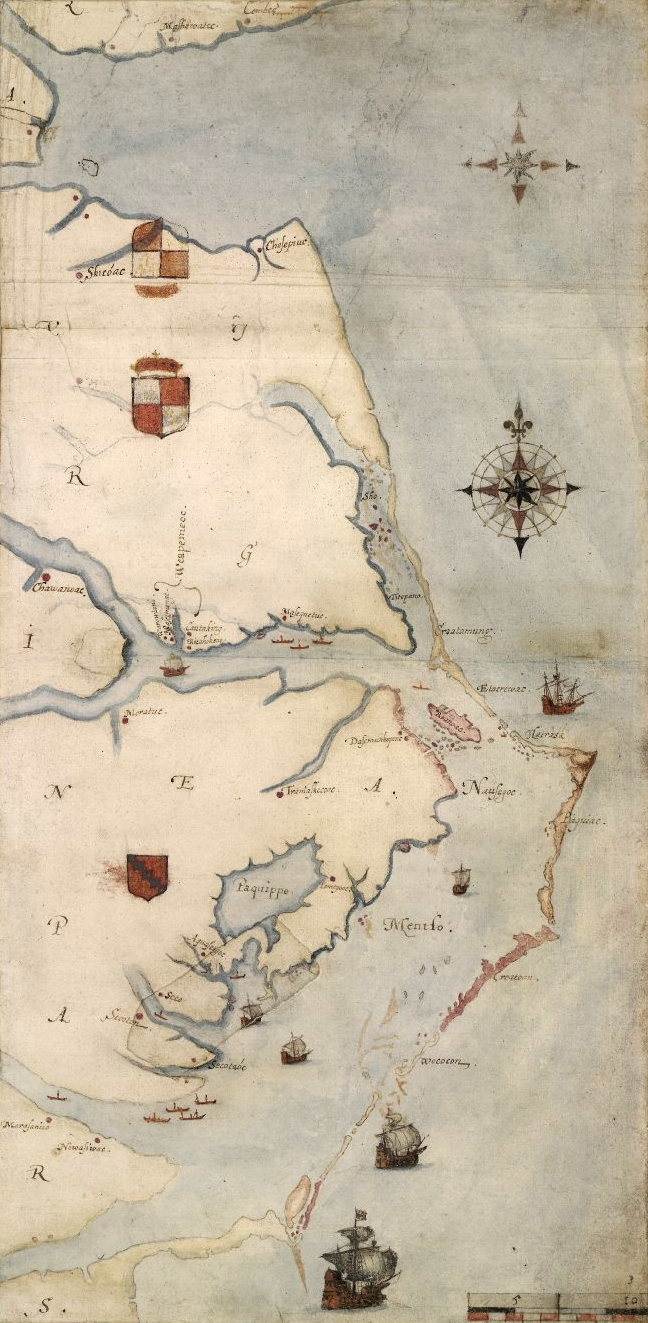
Watercolor sketch by Governor John White of the Roanoke area c. 1585

In 1578, the year following his arrest and release, Fernandes was appointed pilot to Sir Humphrey Gilbert, who was planning an expedition to colonise the Americas with the backing of Walsingham. Fernandes was of course well known to the Spanish authorities, who did not approve of his activities. In 1578 the Spanish Ambassasor wrote to King Philip II of Spain, referring to Gilbert's proposed voyage of discovery:

"They are taking with them one Simon Fernandes, a Portuguese, a thorough-paced scoundrel, who has given and is giving them much information about that coast, which he knows very well. As I am told, he has done no little damage to the King of Portugal..."

In 1580, Gilbert sailed to America in the Squirrel, piloted by Fernandes, apparently making the Atlantic crossing in record time. Undoubtedly he was a skilled navigator, trained by the inestimable Thomas Harriot in the latest navigational tools, and "not without almost incredible results".

During the voyage he shocked the ship's chaplain, Richard Madox of Oxford, by announcing that he was "at war with the King of Spain". Asked how this could be, since Fernandez was by now a subject of the Queen, and therefore officially at peace with the Spanish empire, Fernandes replied that he had a "free pardon from five Privy Councillors for carrying on the war with Spain".

In 1583, Sir Humphrey Gilbert was drowned returning from a journey to Newfoundland. Fernandes was now without a patron, and he soon entered the service of Sir Walter Raleigh, who had inherited his half-brother's Patent of Discovery in Virginia.

Fernandes was undoubtedly a skilled sailor but he appears to have been unpopular among his fellow explorers. He served as master and chief pilot to Raleigh's 1585 expedition to Roanoke, which was led by Sir Richard Grenville, returning to England later that year. During the course of the voyage, his shipmates dubbed him "the swine", though it is possible that his fellow sailors simply objected to a foreigner (and a former subject of Spain at that) being elevated to such a senior position in the voyage.

=== The Lost Colony ===
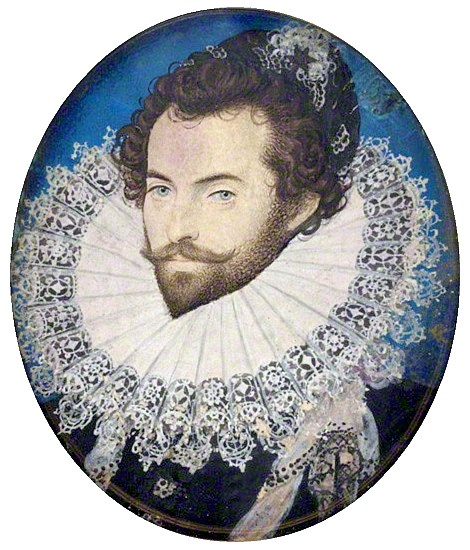
Fernandes' patron, Sir Walter Raleigh

Coat of arms of Simão Fernandes.

In May 1587 Fernandes piloted a new expedition, a group of colonists led by governor John White which sailed for Virginia in The Lion. This time White and his fellow settlers included women and children, with a view to establishing a permanent colony in Virginia. White and Fernandes evidently disliked one another, and White's journal reveals his arguments with his pilot, accusing the Portuguese of many outrages against the interests of the settlers, including "lewdly" abandoning the expedition's flyboat in the course of the voyage.

In 1587 the settlers' chosen destination was not Roanoke but the Chesapeake Bay but, on reaching Roanoke in late July, and allowing the colonists to disembark, Fernandes refused to let White's men re-board ship. According to White's journal, Fernandes' deputy "called to the sailors in the pinesse, charging them not to bring any of the planters back againe, but leave them on the island". Faced with what amounted to a mutiny by his navigator, White appears to have backed down and acquiesced in this sudden change of plan. Despite the governor's protests, Fernandes held that "summer was farre spent, wherefore hee would land all the planters in no other place.". Fernandes's motive for landing the colonists in the wrong spot is not clear, but it may be that he was prompted by his desire (and that of his crew) to return to the West Indies to pursue opportunities for privateering against Spanish shipping.

If Governor White's journal is to be believed, Fernandes' actions appear to have contributed to the poor outcome of the settlement, known to history as the "Lost Colony". Indeed, some modern historians (notably Lee Miller) have suggested that he may have deliberately intended to sabotage the entire enterprise. However, if this was the case then (as Miller herself concedes) his motives for doing so remain unclear.

Miller does however suggest a motive, not for Fernandes himself, but for Walsingham. In somewhat oblique language Miller suggests that the colony may have become a victim of court politics; Walsingham's jealousy at Raleigh's spectacular rise led him to sabotage the colony. In this analysis, Fernandes appears as Walsingham's tool, willing and able to defeat the plans of his master's rival.

Whatever the truth of this, the fiasco of 1587 appears to have ended Fernandes' relationship with Raleigh. He participated in no further ventures across the Atlantic, though he did take part in the battle against the Spanish Armada. He disappears from the records after 1590, when he sailed with an English fleet to the Azores, a journey which he most likely did not survive.

== Legacy ==
A copy of one of Fernandes' charts of the East coast of North America still survives in the Cotton Collection, cotton roll XIII.48. This map appears to be one of the chief sources used by John Dee for his 1580 map which he prepared for the Queen, justifying English claims to all of North America north of Florida.
