= Alexandra Gilbreath =

English actress (born 1969)

- Born: 28 March 1969 (age 57); Chalfont St Giles, Buckinghamshire, England
- Education: London Academy of Music and Dramatic Art
- Occupation: Actress
- Children: 2

Alexandra Gilbreath (born 28 March 1969) is an English actress, born in Chalfont St Giles, Buckinghamshire and trained at the London Academy of Music and Dramatic Art.

== Life and career ==
Widely known for her work both in film and on television, Gilbreath is an Associate Artist with the Royal Shakespeare Company, gaining notice in productions of Romeo and Juliet, As You Like It, The Taming of the Shrew (for which she received a Helen Hayes Award nomination for Best Actress), The Tamer Tamed, The Winter's Tale and Merry Wives: the Musical. She was nominated for an Olivier award as Best Supporting Actress for her performance as Olivia in the RSC's Twelfth Night, directed by Greg Doran, which played at the Duke of York's Theatre in the West End in 2010. She was also awarded the 1996 Ian Charleson Award for her performance as the title character in Hedda Gabler for the English Touring Theatre.

Gilbreath's work on the BBC television series Monarch of the Glen as Stella Moon brought her worldwide attention. She was then seen in Life Begins, with Caroline Quentin and Alexander Armstrong. Other television credits include episodes of Absolute Power, Midsomer Murders, The Commander, Casualty and Trial & Retribution. She is probably best known to ITV audiences for playing the original Sun Hill Serial Killer Pat Kitson on The Bill. In 2006, she appeared in episode one of the sitcom Not Going Out as depressed author Lucy Moss.

Gilbreath appeared as Alice Ford in the Royal Shakespeare Company Christmas production of The Merry Wives Of Windsor, at the Royal Shakespeare Theatre, Stratford upon Avon. The production, directed by Philip Breen, ran from 29 October 2012 to 12 January 2013. Her work at the Royal Shakespeare Company includes "Shakespeare Live! From The RSC", broadcast by the BBC to celebrate William Shakespeare’s birthday and the 400th anniversary of his death. She also worked with the RSC at the Swan Theatre on their production of Aphra Behn's The Rover. At the Bush Theatre in London, she premiered Oscar winner Rebecca Lenkiewicz’s play, The Invisible, directed by Michael Oakley.

In 2015 Gilbreath filmed the Justin Chadwick-directed Tulip Fever, with Alicia Vikander and Christoph Waltz, and appeared as Georgina Francis in the BBC TV series Father Brown episode "The Time Machine". She has worked with Trevor Nunn twice - on The Wars Of The Roses in Kingston and Dessert at the Southwark Playhouse. She also performed in the World Premiere of Florian Zeller's The Lie, directed by Lindsay Posner, and appeared at the Hampstead Theatre in the black comedy Mother Christmas.

In 2019, she returned to the Royal Shakespeare Company to play Lady Brute in the Restoration comedy The Provoked Wife.

== Filmography ==
=== Films ===
Film
Year	Title	Role	Notes
2000	Dead Babies	Cecilia	
2007	The All Together	Prue Swain	
2012	The History of Chance	Laura Candle	(Short)
2015	Scarlet Says	Anna Herbert	(Short)
2017	Tulip Fever	Lysbeth	
2020	The Art of Love	Eva Parker	

=== TV ===
Television
Year	Title	Role	Notes
1991	Doctor at the Top	Student	(TV series), 1 episode: "It's Alright, I am a Doctor"
1994	The Brittas Empire	Reporter	(TV series), 1 episode: "Brussels Calling"
1996-1997	Next of Kin	Vanda or Vanda Hooey	(TV series), 3 episodes: "Pollution", "The Sports Day" and "Embarrassment"
1996-2003	The Bill	Emma Simpson (1996) / Pat Kitson (2002-2003)	(TV series), 12 episodes
1997	Wing and a Prayer	Karen Simpson	(TV series), 1 episode: "The Ties That Bind"
1997	The Heart Surgeon	Rachel Ryan	(TV movie)
1997	A Touch of Frost	Jackie Sheridan	(TV series), 1 episode: "True Confessions"
1998	Out of Hours	Mrs. Russell	(TV Mini-Series), 1 episode: "Episode #1.4"
1999	The Winter's Tale	Hermione, Queen to Leontes	A straight-to-video filming of the 1999 RSC's Barbican production
1999	Children's Ward	Geena	(TV series), 2 episodes: "Episode #11.3", "Episode #11.4"
2001	Monarch of the Glen	Stella Moon	(TV series), 9 episodes
2002	The Project	Deborah	(Two-part television film)
2003	Happiness	Amanda	(TV series), 2 episodes: "People Move On" and "Old Bloke at the Door"
2003	Midsomer Murders	Naomi Sinclair	(TV series), 1 episode: "Birds of Prey"
2004-2006	Life Begins	Mia	(TV series), 3 episodes: "Maggie & Phil (2004)", "Episode #3.1" and "Episode #3.3"
2005	Taggart	Private Lombard	(TV series), 1 episode: "Do or Die"
2005	Strauss: The Waltz King	Anna Strauss	(TV movie)
2005	Absolute Power	Ashley Pink	(TV series), 1 episode: "Blood Bank"
2005	The Commander: Virus	Vera Judd	(TV movie)
2006	Not Going Out	Lucy Moss	(TV series), 1 episode: "Serious"
2008-2015	Casualty	Julie Borras (2008) / Eileen Brightwell (2015)	(TV series), 2 episodes: "Saturday Night Fever" and "The Department of Secrets"
2009	Ladies of Letters	Newsreader	(TV series), 1 episode: "Episode #1.5"
2009	Trial & Retribution	Alex Phelps	(TV series), 1 episode: "Ghost Train: Part 1"
2011	Inspector George Gently	Pat Shepherd	(TV series), 1 episode: "Goodbye China"
2013	Doctors	Dr. Germaine Everson	(TV series), 1 episode: "Stressed Out"
2013-2019	EastEnders	Dr. Liz Farley (2013) / Nicola Kelly (2018 - 2019)	(TV series), 8 episodes
2014	WPC 56	Lydia Bloom	(TV series), 1 episode: "That Old Devil Called Love"
2015	Father Brown	Georgina Francis	(TV series), 1 episode: "The Time Machine"
2022	Becoming Elizabeth	Kat Ashley	TV series
2025	The Chelsea Detective	Roz Chambers	(TV series), 1 episode: “Deadlock”
