= Philip Champernowne =

English courtier (c. 1479 – 1545)

Sir Philip Champernowne
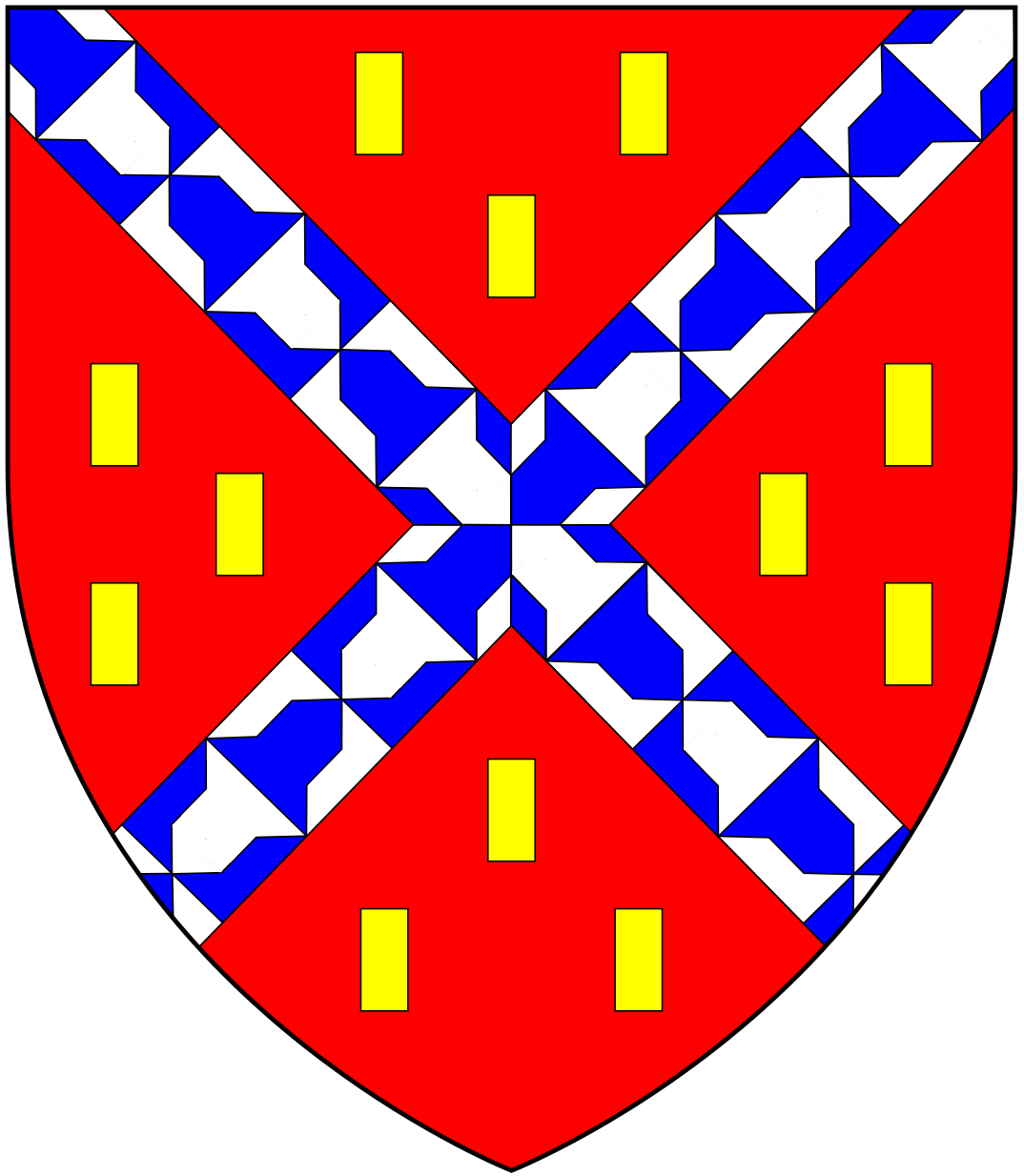
- Arms of Champernowne: Gules, a saltire vair between twelve billets or
- Born: c. 1479
- Died: 2 August 1545 (aged 65–66); Modbury, Devon
- Resting place: St George's Church, Modbury, Devon; 50.348611°N 3.890556°W
- Occupation: Courtier
- Spouse: Katherine Carew
- Children: John Champernowne; Sir Arthur Champernowne; Joan Champernowne; Katherine Champernowne; 4 more
- Parents: Sir John Champernowne; Margaret Courtenay
- Family: Champernowne

Sir Philip Champernowne (c. 1479 – 2 August 1545) of Modbury, Devon was an English landowner and courtier. He was an Esquire of the Body to Henry VIII by 1523 and was Sheriff of Devon from 1526 to 1527.

== Early life ==
He was the only son, and heir, of Sir John Champernowne (d. 1503), of Modbury, Bridford and Dodbrook in Devon and Margaret Courtenay (d. 1536), daughter of Sir Philip Courtenay of Molland, Devon.

He was aged 24 when his father died on 30 April 1503. By the time of his father's death he had been married for some time and was living at Aston Rowant in Oxfordshire. His mother subsequently married John West. In the period 1505 to 1515, he sued West, his mother, Margaret, and Philip Courtenay in Chancery regarding the retention of deeds relating to the manors of Modbury, Dodbrook and Bridford, and messuages and lands in South Ludbrook, Shipham, Buckland Dinham, and Woodleigh, Devon.

== Marriage and family ==
Arms of Katherine Champernowne, daughter of Sir Philip Champernowne, mother of Sir Humphrey Gilbert and Sir Walter Raleigh, impaled by the arms of her first husband Otho Gilbert. St Mary the Virgin's church, Churston Ferrers

He married Katherine Carew, daughter of Sir Edmund Carew, Baron Carew, of Carew Castle and Katherine Huddesfield, daughter of Sir William Huddesfield. By Katherine he had 2 sons and 6 daughters:

- John Champernowne (d. 1541/42), married Katherine Blount (d. 1560), daughter of William Blount, 4th Baron Mountjoy, by whom he had a son:
  - Henry Champernowne (c.1538–1570), his heir, and heir to his grandfather.

His widow subsequently married, Sir Maurice Berkeley (d. 1581) of Bruton, Somerset.

- Sir Arthur Champernowne, married, by 1547, Mary Norris (d. 1570), widow of Sir George Carew of Mohuns Ottery and daughter of Henry Norris of Bray, Berkshire.
- Elizabeth Champernowne, married 1st. William Cole of Cornwood; 2nd. ? Pollard.
- Frances Champernowne (d. after 1569), married Roger Budockshide (d. 1577).
- Jane (or Joan) Champernowne, married, before 1531, Robert Gamage, of Coity, Glamorgan.
- Joan Champernowne, married, in 1538, Sir Anthony Denny, Groom of the Stool to Henry VIII.
- Katherine Champernowne, married 1st. Otho Gilbert (1513–1547) of Greenway in the parish of Brixham and of Compton Castle in the parish of Marldon, by whom she was the mother of Sir Humphrey Gilbert; 2nd. Walter Raleigh (1510–1581) of Fardel Manor in the parish of Cornwood, by whom she was the mother of Sir Walter Raleigh. The coat of arms of Otho Gilbert and Katherine Champernowne survives in a stained glass window in St Mary the Virgin's church, Churston Ferrers.
- Katherine Champernowne, married, in 1545, John Astley of Allington and Maidstone, Kent.

== Career ==
He presented to St Thomas Becket's church, Bridford in 1508.

He owed money to the Crown and received a pardon in June 1509, and in October 1510 Philip Champernowne, his father-in-law, Sir Edmund Carew, and his brother-in-law, Thomas Carew of Bickleigh made recognizances for the repayment of loans.

On 26 April 1523, Philip Champernowne, "squire for the Body" received a grant of the lease of the manor of Curry Mallett, Somerset, parcel of the Duchy of Cornwall, for 21 years, and in August of the same year he had a commission for the subsidy for Devon.

He played a prominent role in the funeral procession of Catherine of York at Tiverton in 1527. On Monday 2 December ″The corpse was borne by six tall yeomen, of equal height, from the castle to the church; and attended by Sir Thomas Dennys, Sir John Bassett, Sir William Carew, and Mr. Philip Champernon, one at each corner.″

On Friday, the 15th of November, at eight o'clock in the evening, the Princess Catherine, youngest daughter of King Edward IV. and widow of William Courtenay, Earl of Devon, and Lord of this manor, died in the castle of Tiverton. Her body being embalmed, leaded, and chested, she was conveyed from thence to the chapel, and placed within a bar, covered with a pall of black velvet, on which was a cross of white satin, and upon that another pall of cloth of gold, with a cross of silver tissue thereon, ornamented with six escutcheons of her arms: there it was attended day and night, with great funeral pomp, 'till Monday the 2d of December, when, with a formal procession, it was brought to St. Peter's church, under a canopy of black velvet, borne by six esquires; at each corner whereof a banner of saints was carried by as many esquires, viz. of the Trinity, our Lady, St. Edward, and St. Catherine; the bearers all in black gowns and hoods: eight bannerels, carried by eight gentlemen, four on one side and four on the other. The chief mourner was the Lady Carew, assisted by Sir Peter Edgcombe: her train was held up by one lady, followed by six others.

In April, 1529, he was granted a commission of the peace for Devon; In June 1530, he had commission for gaol delivery, Exeter Castle, Devon. He was knighted by December 1530, and again had a commission of the peace for Devon.

Champernowne kept a fine manor at Modbury and employed a company of musicians which entertained the King at Windsor. The latter is described in Sabiine Baring-Gould's A Book of the West; Being an Introduction to Devon and Cornwall (1899).

In the reign of Henry VIII. Sir Philip Champernowne, of Modbury, went up to Windsor, taking with him his company of musicians on rote and tabor and psaltery and dulcimer, and all kinds of music, and they performed before King Henry, to that huge monarch's huge content. So pleased was he with their "consort of fine musicke," that he bade Sir Philip remain with his company at Windsor, to play to him whenever the evil spirit was on him; but forgot to say that this was to be at royal charges. The entertaining of his band of musicians at court by Sir Philip during many months proved so great an expense that when he returned to Modbury he was a wiser and a much poorer man, and had to sell a manor or two to meet his liabilities.

Champernowne was an educated man who engaged in learned discussions about the history of his family with the antiquary John Leland. He gave his children the benefit of the new interest in classical scholarship. Two of his daughters, Katherine, the future Elizabeth I's governess, wife of John Astley, and Joan, who married Anthony Denny, were commended at court for their learning.

By 1536, Champernowne's financial resources may have been under considerable strain. On 10 October 1536, his daughter, Katherine, recently appointed gentlewoman to the King's daughter, the Lady Elizabeth, wrote to Thomas Cromwell to thank him for preferring her to her present room and reporting well of her to the King. She is not able to maintain her room to the King's honour without some yearly stipend, and asks him to remember it to the King. She would not have troubled him, but for necessity. She will be loth to charge her father, who has as much to do with the little living he has as any man.

In December 1538 Champernowne informed the Duke of Norfolk of his dealings with his disgraced kinsman, Henry Courtenay, Marquess of Exeter. He believed he was "in danger for my lord Marquis in divers bonds" and only "used familiarity" with him until they were discharged, when he intended to give up the office of the Stannery under him. "The bonds were one of 100l., whereof 20l. paid, the other to pay yearly 40l. to one Lady Gray, but which Lady Gray he knows not."

In July 1539, and again in February 1541, he had a commissions of the peace for Devon. His fortunes improved significantly in June of 1541 when he received a grant of the site of Plympton Priory, which had been dissolved in March 1539, and he immediately set about selling a number of the buildings for demolition to William Strode of Newnham.

He had a commission of oyer and terminer in July 1543 and commissions for gaol delivery and sewers in 1545.

== Death ==
He died at the family seat in Modbury on 2 August 1545 and was probably buried at St George's Church, Modbury, where several Champernowne monuments survive. In his will, dated 1 August 1545 (proved 5 February 1546: P.C.C. Alen 3}, he praises his wife, Katherine, who is still living, for ″the most obedient duty and gentleness″ she always showed him. He also mentions his younger son, Arthur (aged 21), the elder son, John (now deceased), Katherine (John's widow) and John's son, his grandson and heir, Henry (aged 7). He names his only unmarried daughter, Katherine and George Carew, his wife's brother, as executors.
