= Arthur Champernowne (disambiguation) =

Sir Arthur Champernowne (c. 1524 – 1578) was an English politician and soldier.

Arthur Champernowne may also refer to:

- Arthur Champernowne (died c. 1650)
- Arthur Champernowne (died 1717)
- Arthur Melville Champernowne, owner of Dartington Hall until 1925
