= Arthur Champernowne =

English politician (1524 – 1578

Sir Arthur Champernowne JP
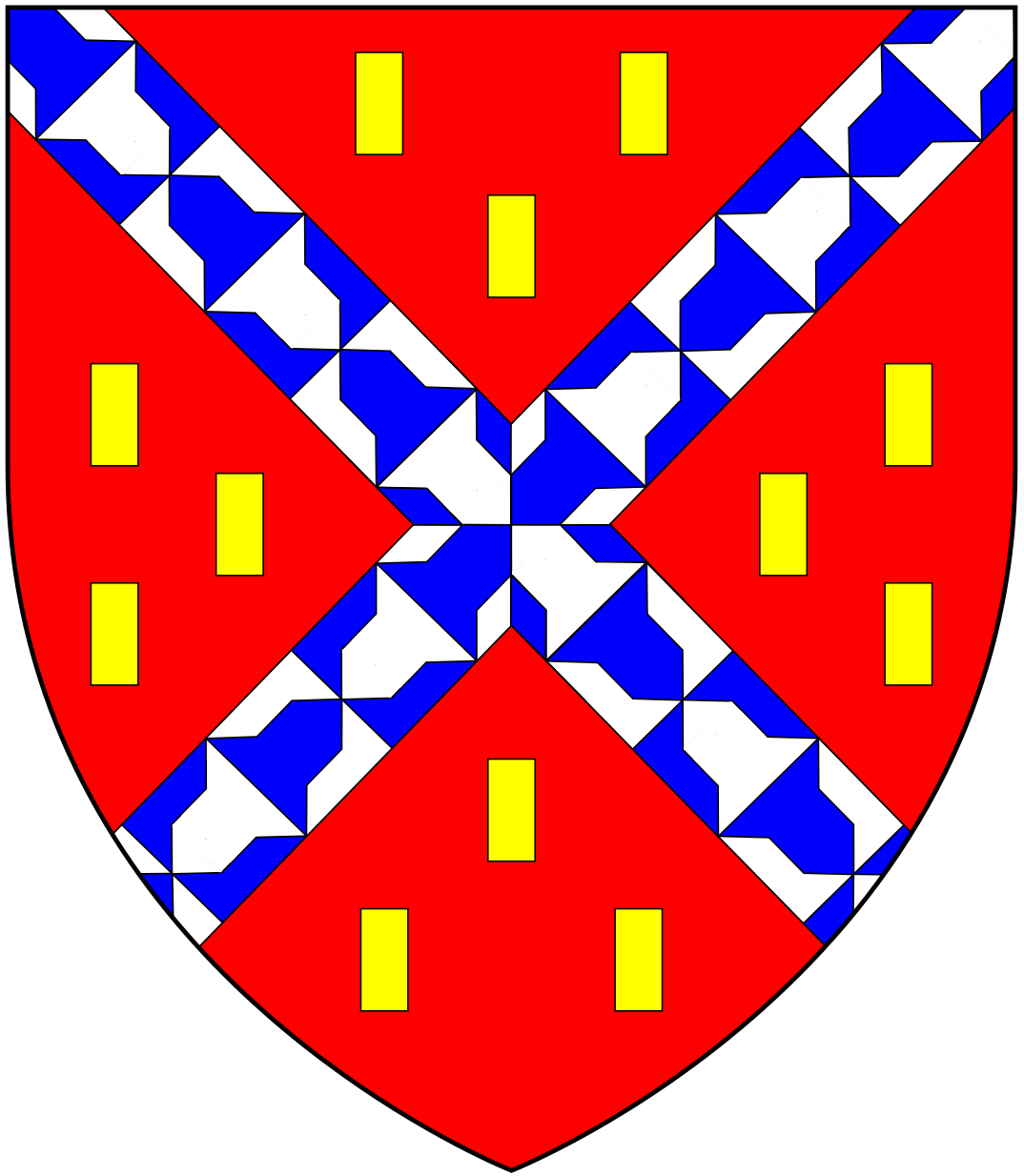
- Arms of Champernowne: Gules, a saltire vair between twelve billets or

Member of Parliament for Barnstaple
- In office 1547–1552

Member of Parliament for Plympton Erle
- In office 1555–1555

Member of Parliament for Plymouth
- In office 1559–1559

Member of Parliament for Totnes
- In office 1563–1567

Personal details
- Born: c. 1524
- Died: 1 April 1578 (aged 53–54) Dartington Hall
- Resting place: Church of St Mary, Dartington; 50.4511°N 3.71222°W
- Spouse: Mary Norris (m. 1547; died 1570)
- Children: Gawen; Philip; Charles; George; Edward; Elizabeth
- Parents: Sir Philip Champernowne; Katherine Carew

Sir Arthur Champernowne (c. 1524 – 1 April 1578) of Modbury and Dartington Hall, Devon, was an English landowner, soldier and politician. He was elected Member of Parliament (MP) for the seat of Barnstaple in 1552, Plympton Erle in 1555, Plymouth in 1559, and Totnes in 1563. He was Sheriff of Devon in 1559 and Vice-Admiral of the Devon Coasts by 1563.

Champernowne belonged to a large Anglo-Norman family that originated from Cambernon, in Normandy. Following the Norman Conquest of the 11th century, members of the family acquired estates in Devon. Their surname was originally spelt Champernon, and Sir Arthur Champernowne has sometimes been referred to by that spelling; he was also known by at least three other surnames: Chamborne, Chapman, and Chamberlain. (These variations may reflect, at least in part, a state of flux in English during the 16th century, including variations in the spelling and usage of surnames by individuals.)

Other members of the Champernowne family were prominent in (royal) court, political and military circles during the 16th century: Arthur Champernowne's aunt Lady Kat Ashley (or Astley; née Champernowne) was governess to Queen Elizabeth I, and Sir Walter Raleigh and Sir Humphrey Gilbert were his nephews.

Champernowne is sometimes confused with several relatives also christened Arthur, especially Sir Arthur Champernowne (also Champernon; born c. 1562), an emissary of Elizabeth I during the 1580s.

== Biography ==
Champernowne was the second son of Sir Philip Champernowne (d. 1545) of Modbury, Devon, by his wife Katherine Carew, daughter of Sir Edmund Carew, of Mohuns Ottery. When England was alerted to a possible invasion, he served in the English army at the Siege of Boulougne.

In 1549, Champernowne helped subdue a rebellion that sought to have the Latin Bible restored to a position of authority over the English-language version. The rebellion began in Cornwall, where the Cornish language was still widely spoken and English was regarded as a foreign language. He was knighted on 10 November 1549 for his part in crushing the western rebellion.

Champernowne was an ardent protestant. He flirted with the conspiracy of cousin, Sir Peter Carew to support the claim of Lady Jane Grey, but wisely settled for accepting Mary Tudor. Champernowne was installed as Member of Parliament for Barnstaple in 1552 (replacing the elected MP, Sir James Wilford, who had died).

He spent early 1554 in the Tower, but was released on recognizance of a fine of £1000, and allowed to return to Devon. Although excluded from office by the Marian regime, he was chosen a local JP in 1555. They elected him in turn for Plympton Erle in 1555, Plymouth in 1559 and Totnes in 1563.

== Family ==
By 1547 Sir Arthur married Mary Norris (d. 1570), widow of Sir George Carew, and daughter of Henry Norris (d. 1536), who had been implicated in the fall of Anne Boleyn and was beheaded. The couple had five sons and a daughter:

- Gawen (d. 1592), married Roberte de Montgomery, daughter of Comte Gabriel de Montgomery and Isabel de la Touche.
- Philip
- Charles
- George
- Edward
- Elizabeth, who married Sir Edward Seymour, 1st Baronet

In 1554 he exchanged with Thomas Aylworth, Lord of Dartington, the mansion house at Polsloe, Exeter for the Dartington estate, which contained the medieval Dartington Hall. By 1560 the construction of a new Elizabethan front on the foundation of the older buildings was underway and this continued for several years. His descendants continued to live in Dartington Hall until it became partly derelict and was sold in 1925.

Official Posts:

- 1552 - MP for Barnstaple
- 1555 – MP for Plympton
- 1559 - MP for Plymouth
- 1559 – Sheriff of Devon
- 1563 – Vice-Admiral of the Devon Coasts, a post he held for life.
- 1563 – MP for Totnes.

On the accession of Elizabeth I he developed his maritime interests: from being Sheriff of Devon in 1559–60, he put to sea. As vice-admiral appointed in 1563, his service against French pirates was noted: constant harassment along the western approaches. However, from time to time he co-operated with the privateers of Jeanne d'Albret, Queen of Navarre, against Catholic Spain. In December 1568, many of these ships were driven up the channel and into Southampton and Portsmouth to be received by Sir Arthur and Edward Horsey, in the name of the Queen of England. In 1568 he had organised the robbery of the Spanish treasure fleet which was taking money to the Duke of Alva, Regent of the Netherlands. Champernowne personally delivered 64 boxes of treasure weighing some 8 tonnes safely to the tower of London, worth some 2 million reales. Over half of the money was used by Queen Elizabeth to fund her navy, the remainder she sent on to Amsterdam.

He was a prominent supporter of protestantism and in 1572, his son Gawen married the daughter of Gabriel, Count of Montgomery, a Huguenot. The Count, whose immediate forebears were Scots, was Captain of the Scots Guards. Champernowne was at Dwercy, France for the marriage and reported back to Lord Burghley on the conditions in France. Following the massacre of St Bartholomew's Eve, the Count escaped France and was given refuge at Dartington Hall. Champernowne wrote to Queen Elizabeth proposing the raising of an army to provide relief for the protestants in France.

In 1574 he led a relief expedition which went spectacularly wrong. Montgomery had already been captured and executed in Normandy, and the English fleet could only aid the Huguenot captains of La Rochelle. Sir Arthur's daughter Elizabeth married Sir Edward Seymour of Berry Pomeroy in 1576. Champernowne was continuing to support the naval exploits against France, when he wrote his will in March 1578. He died at Dartington Hall on 1 April. A wall-monument depicting Champernowne, his wife and children kneeling before two prayer-desks, survives within the Tower of Dartington church, Devon.

== Sources ==
- Cherry, Bridget; Nikolaus, Pevsner (2004). Devon. The Buildings of England (2nd ed.). New Haven: Yale University Press. ISBN 9780300095968. OCLC 1178918786.
- Hasler, P. W. (1981). "Champernown, Sir Arthur (c.1525-78), of Modbury and Dartington, Devon". In Hasler, P. W. (ed.). The History of Parliament: the House of Commons 1558-1603. The History of Parliament. Archived from the original on 5 January 2024.
- Hawkyard, A. D. K. (1982). "Champernown (Chamberlain, Chamborne), Sir Arthur (by 1524-78), of Modbury and Dartington, Devon.". In Bindoff, S. T. (ed.). The History of Parliament: the House of Commons 1509-1558. The History of Parliament.
- Loades, David Michael (1965). Two Tudor Conspiracies. Cambridge: University Press. OCLC 399187.
- Ramsay, G. D. (1986). The Queen's Merchants and the Revolt of the Netherlands: The End of the Antwerp Mart. Manchester: University Press. ISBN 9780719018497.
- Trim, D. J. B. (21 May 2009) [23 September 2004]. "Champernowne, Sir Arthur". Oxford Dictionary of National Biography (online ed.). Oxford University Press. doi:10.1093/ref:odnb/71675. (Subscription, Wikipedia Library access or UK public library membership required.)
- Vivian, J. L. (1895). The Visitations of the County of Devon, Comprising the Heralds' Visitations of 1531, 1564, to 1620, with additions by J. L. Vivian. Exeter: H.S. Eland. p. 163.
- Weis, Frederick Lewis (2004). Ancestral Roots of Certain American Colonists Who Came to America before 1700 (8th ed.). Baltimore: Genealogical Publishing Company. ISBN 978-0-8063-1752-6.
