= Kat Ashley =

English courtier (died 1565)

Katherine Ashley
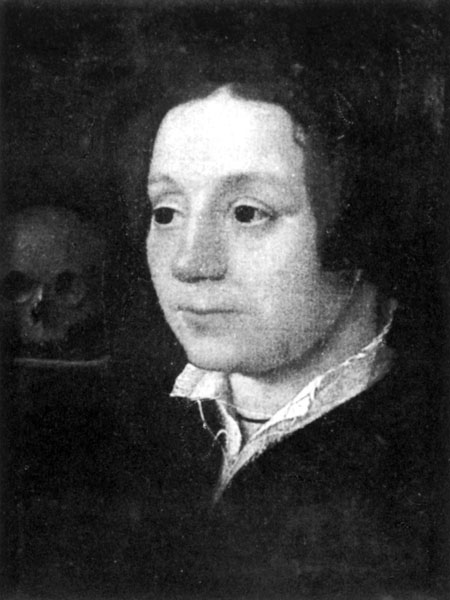
- Portrait of Katherine "Kat" Ashley, painted in the 16th century, Collection of Lord Hastings
- Born: Katherine Champernowne
- Died: 18 July 1565; London
- Occupation: Courtier
- Spouse: John Ashley (m. 1545)
- Parents: Sir Philip Champernowne; Katherine Carew
- Relatives: Joan Champernowne (sister)

Katherine Ashley (née Champernowne; died 18 July 1565), also known as Kat Ashley or Astley, was the first close friend, governess, and Lady of the Bedchamber to Queen Elizabeth I. She was the sister of Catherine Champernowne, who was the mother of Sir Humphrey Gilbert from her first marriage and Sir Walter Raleigh by her second marriage.

== Parentage ==
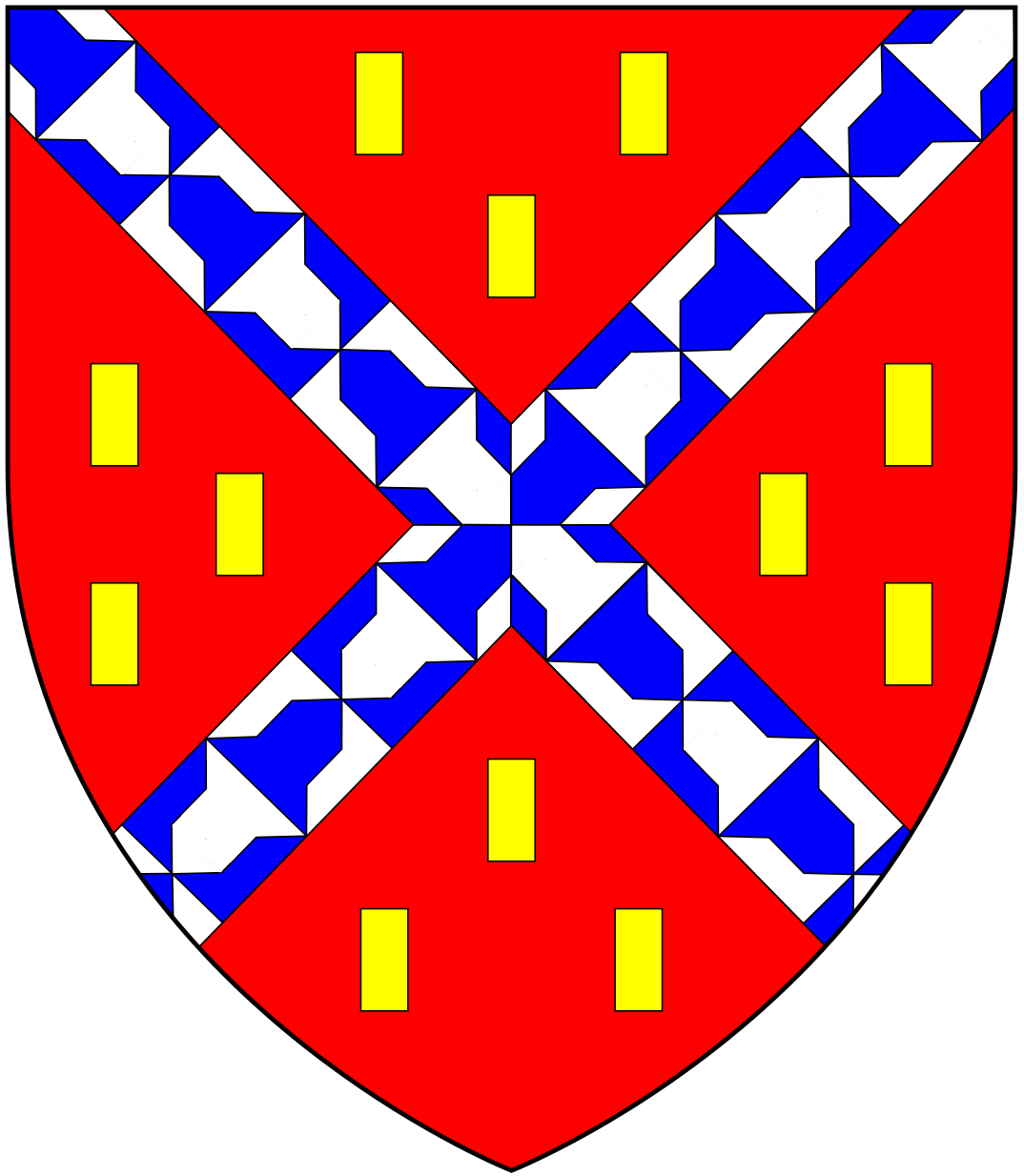
Coat of Arms of the Champernowne family: Gules, a saltire vair between twelve billets or

Katherine was the daughter of Sir Philip Champernowne (d. 1545) of Modbury, Devon and his wife, Katherine Carew, daughter of Sir Edmund Carew of Mohuns Ottery, Devon, and his wife, Katherine. Her sister Joan Champernowne, married Sir Anthony Denny, Groom of the Stool and a trusted servant to King Henry VIII.

== Royal governess ==
Katherine Champernowne gained an appointment as a gentlewoman in waiting to the then Lady Elizabeth in July 1536, helped by Thomas Cromwell.

After Prince Edward's birth, Elizabeth's governess, Lady Margaret Bryan, was transferred to her half-brother's service. She was placed in the care of Lady Troy, who remained Elizabeth's governess until she retired in late 1545 or early 1546.

In 1537, Katherine became four-year-old Elizabeth's third governess. Sources state that she accustomed the little girl to the "elaborate code of politeness and respect to her elders". In addition, she taught her charge pursuits such as needlework, embroidery, dancing, and riding. By the age of six, Elizabeth was able to sew a beautiful cambric shirt as a gift for her younger half-brother. Evidently, Katherine had been well educated for she effectively taught the precocious princess mathematics, geography, astronomy, history, French, Italian, Flemish, and Spanish. Elizabeth herself praised Katherine's early devotion to her studies by stating that Kat (as the future Queen called her governess) took "great labour and pain in bringing of me up in learning and honesty".

== Lady-in-waiting ==
In 1543, Henry VIII married Catherine Parr, who gave Elizabeth a more stable family life, restored her right to succession, and brought her household to the royal court. In 1545, Katherine married John Ashley, Elizabeth's senior gentleman attendant and cousin of Anne Boleyn. She was over 40 years old at this date. However, King Henry died in 1547 and was succeeded by Edward VI, whose uncles Edward and Thomas Seymour tried to get control of him. Shortly after Henry VIII died, Thomas Seymour investigated whether he could be permitted to marry either the Princess Mary or Princess Elizabeth, but he was refused. Seymour immediately began courting Parr as they had been romantically linked before she became Queen. In her early 30s and still childless, Parr agreed to marry Seymour only two months after her husband's death and was able to secure royal approval to take young Elizabeth to her new home in Chelsea with Kat as the princess' Chief Gentlewoman.

After Thomas Seymour began a flirtation with the 14-year-old Elizabeth, Kat first thought this amusing. However, this changed after he entered the girl's bedroom in the morning in his nightshirt and tried to tickle her while she was still in bed. Kat became concerned and advised Parr, who was later accused of taking part in holding down Elizabeth while Seymour slashed her gown "into a thousand pieces." There was a major incident in which Kat said that the Dowager Queen had caught Elizabeth in Seymour's arms, which caused both stepmother and governess to lecture the princess about the need to protect her reputation. Shortly afterwards, Elizabeth and her household moved to Hatfield House, but gossip already spread. After Parr died after childbirth on 5 September 1548, Ashley tried to convince her mistress to write to Thomas and "comfort him in his sorrow", but Elizabeth claimed that he wasn't so saddened by her stepmother's death as to need comfort. Indeed, Thomas renewed his attentions towards Elizabeth with intent on marrying her.

The rumours about Thomas Seymour's "flirtation" towards Elizabeth emerged in 1548 as his other political manoeuvres were revealed. On 21 January 1549, Katherine was arrested and taken to the Tower for possible involvement in Seymour's activities. She told her story, was found to have done nothing treasonous, and was released thirteen days before Seymour's execution. Despite detailed questioning, Katherine didn't implicate Elizabeth in Seymour's schemes. Blanche Parry, second in the household, was Elizabeth's Chief Gentlewoman while Katherine was in prison.

By August 1549, Katherine had returned to Hatfield, where she was in charge of Elizabeth's linen and supplied head dresses called "crippons". She stayed with Elizabeth until her mistress was imprisoned in the Tower by Queen Mary I in 1554. Katherine was held in the custody of Sir Roger Cholmeley until May 1555. She was allowed to rejoin Elizabeth in October 1555, but was arrested in May 1556 following the discovery of seditious books. She spent three months in Fleet Prison and was forbidden to see Elizabeth again after her release.

== Favourite of Queen Elizabeth ==
After Mary I died in 1558 and Elizabeth became Queen of England, Katherine was appointed First Lady of the Bedchamber while her husband was appointed Master of the Jewel Office. She was given purple velvet and scarlet and tinsel fabrics to wear on the evening before Elizabeth's coronation. Katherine became very influential as a source of information for the Queen and as means of asking favours for the nobles. She helped to form a strict aristocracy, which helped to maintain the Queen's dominance over government for most of her reign.

George Brediman, keeper of the wardrobe at Westminster, issued old copes and vestments to Kat Ashley in December 1560. In May 1561, Queen Elizabeth made Katherine a gift of an old French velvet gown lined with taffeta and wide sleeves cut up to make cushion covers.

In 1561, Ashley discussed patterns for jewels drawn on parchment with a merchant John Dymocke. This led to involvement with Dorothy Bradbelt in a scheme for Elizabeth to marry Erik XIV of Sweden. Their actions angered Elizabeth, and Kat and Dorothy were briefly put under house arrest.

In 1562 she was given a pewter metal doll for the use of Ippolyta the Tartarian, a young woman brought from Russia by Anthony Jenkinson. Katherine died peacefully in London on 18 July 1565, to Queen Elizabeth's great distress, since her dear friend was not in attendance at court when she died. Parry succeeded her as Chief Gentlewoman of the Privy Chamber. When on her death bed, Elizabeth continually visited her and mourned her sincerely and unaffectedly.

== Portrayal in popular culture ==
- Elizabeth R (1971 mini-series) – Rachel Kempson
- Blackadder II (1986 sitcom) – Patsy Byrne as Nursie
- Elizabeth (1998 feature film) – Emily Mortimer
- Elizabeth (2000 TV documentary) – Jan Winters
- The Virgin Queen (2005–2006 mini-series) – Tara Fitzgerald
- The Tudors (2007–2010 TV series) – Maude Hirst
- Becoming Elizabeth (2022 TV series) – Alexandra Gilbreath
- The Virgin Trial (play) by Kate Henning
- The Queen's Governess, a novel written by Karen Harper
- The Lady Grace Mysteries, a series of novels written by Patricia Finney
- The Queen's Handmaiden, a novel written by Jennifer Ashley
- My Lady of Cleves , a novel written by Margaret Campbell Barnes
- The Lady Elizabeth , a novel written by Allison Weir
- Three Queens, a play written by Rosamund Gravelle, and first played by Sally Sharp
- Queen B (2024 novella) - Juno Dawson
