= Anthony Denny =

English politician (1501–1549)

The Honourable Sir Anthony Denny PC JP
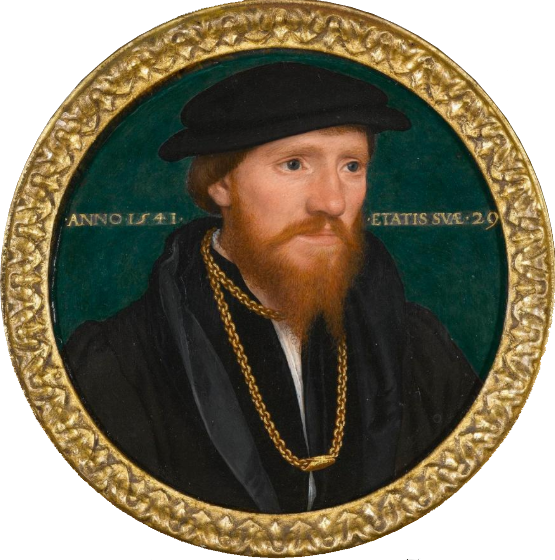
- Sir Anthony Denny, 1541 by Gerlach Flicke (?)
- Born: 16 January 1501
- Died: 10 September 1549 (aged 48); Cheshunt, Hertfordshire
- Resting place: St Mary's church, Cheshunt; 51.7043°N 0.048966°W
- Education: St Paul's School, London; St John's College, Cambridge
- Occupations: Courtier; Politician
- Spouse: Joan Champernowne (m. 1538)
- Children: Henry Denny; Sir Edward Denny; Mary Denny; 6 more
- Parents: Sir Edmund Denny; Mary Troutbeck
- Family: Denny

Arms of Denny: Gules, a saltire argent between twelve crosses pattée or

Sir Anthony Denny (16 January 1501 – 10 September 1549) was Groom of the Stool to King Henry VIII of England, thus his closest courtier and confidant. In 1539 he was appointed a gentleman of the privy chamber and was its most prominent member in King Henry's last years, having together with his brother-in-law, John Gates, charge of the "dry stamp" of the King's signature, and attended the King on his deathbed. He was a member of the Reformist circle that offset the conservative religious influence of Bishop Gardiner. He was a wealthy man, having acquired several manors and former religious sites distributed by the Court of Augmentations after the Dissolution of the Monasteries.

== Life ==
Anthony Denny was the second son of Sir Edmund Denny (d. 22 December 1520), a Baron of the Exchequer, by his second wife, Mary Troutbeck, the daughter and coheir of Robert Troutbeck of Bridge Trafford in Cheshire. He had an elder brother, Sir Thomas Denny, of Bury St Edmunds, Suffolk, who married Elizabeth Monoux, the daughter of Sir George Monoux, Lord Mayor of London, as well as two younger brothers and ten sisters, including Martha.

Denny was educated at St Paul's School and tradition asserts, at St John's College, Cambridge. He was first a servant of the courtier Francis Bryan, and joined the king's household in 1533 as a groom of the privy chamber. He was appointed keeper of Whitehall Palace in January 1536. Jane Seymour gave him a brooch. He was made Yeoman of the Robes in September 1537.

He was present at the wedding of Henry VIII to Catherine Parr in the Queen's Privy Closet at Hampton Court on 12 July 1543. In 1544, he joined Henry's military expedition to France. He was knighted at the capture of Boulogne in 1544. He became Groom of the Stool in October 1546. He oversaw the use and maintenance of the king's close stool.

In 1547, he was elected knight of the shire (MP) for Hertfordshire and in the same year attended meetings of the Privy Council. By 1548, he was keeper of the Palace of Westminster.

Along with Edward Seymour, Earl of Hertford, John Dudley, Viscount Lisle, and Sir William Paget, Denny helped to finalise King Henry VIII's will upon his deathbed in 1547. Denny specifically argued to the King on several occasions against the removal of Bishop Gardiner from the will. Denny was himself the man to tell King Henry of his coming death, advising the old King "to prepare for his final agony". His position gave him both the power to control who saw King Henry VIII in his last years (in which he spent much time in the Privy Chambers), and the power to influence, through his personal relationship with the ageing King. Along with Sir William Paget, the Principal Secretary, Denny is suspected of having fixed the choosing of the "Progressive" appeals, headed by Edward Seymour.

In 1549, during the Seymour affair, Denny was sent to Hatfield House to arrest the Lady Elizabeth's cofferer Thomas Parry and his sister-in-law Kat Ashley. Denny joined the forces raised against Kett's Rebellion in August 1549.

He died at Cheshunt, the family seat in Hertfordshire, on 10 September 1549. Denny is buried without surviving stone memorials at St. Mary parish church at Cheshunt.

== Marriage and family ==
On 9 February 1538, Denny married Joan Champernowne, the daughter of Sir Philip Champernowne, and the close friend of King Henry VIII's wife, Catherine Parr. She was the sister of Kat Ashley, governess of the Lady Elizabeth. They had 5 sons and 4 daughters, including:

- Henry Denny, Dean of Chester (d. 24 March 1574). He married, firstly, Honory Grey, daughter of William Grey, 13th Baron Grey de Wilton and Mary Somerset. Their son was Edward Denny, 1st Earl of Norwich. His second wife was Elizabeth Grey, by whom he had a son, who died unmarried.
- Edward Denny (soldier) (1547–1599), who married Margaret Edgcumbe, daughter of Sir Piers Edgcumbe (1536 - c. 1607).
- Mary Denny, who married Thomas Astley of Writtle, one of the grooms of the Privy Chamber to Elizabeth I.

Three of his sons, who were also reformers, exiled themselves from England under Mary I of England.

== Arms ==
Coat of arms of Anthony Denny
Notes Carey impaling Denny: From the Heraldic East Window, St Lawrence's Church, Mereworth. Crest An arm erect habited Azure, charged with a quatrefoil Argent, holding in the hand proper a garb Or. Escutcheon Quarterly — 1 and 4. Gules, crusily patée Or, a saltire Argent; 2. Or, a fess dancettée Gules, in chief three martlets Sable; 3. TROUTBECK, a mullet pierced Or for difference. Motto Et mea messis erit (Latin for "And my harvest is to come")

== See also ==
- Hans Holbein the Younger

== Notes ==
Parliament of England
Preceded by Richard Lee; John Cock	Member of Parliament for Hertfordshire; 1547–1549; With: Ralph Rowlett	Succeeded by Ralph Sadler; John Cock
