= Joan Champernowne =

Lady-in-waiting in the court of Henry VIII

Lady Denny Joan Champernowne
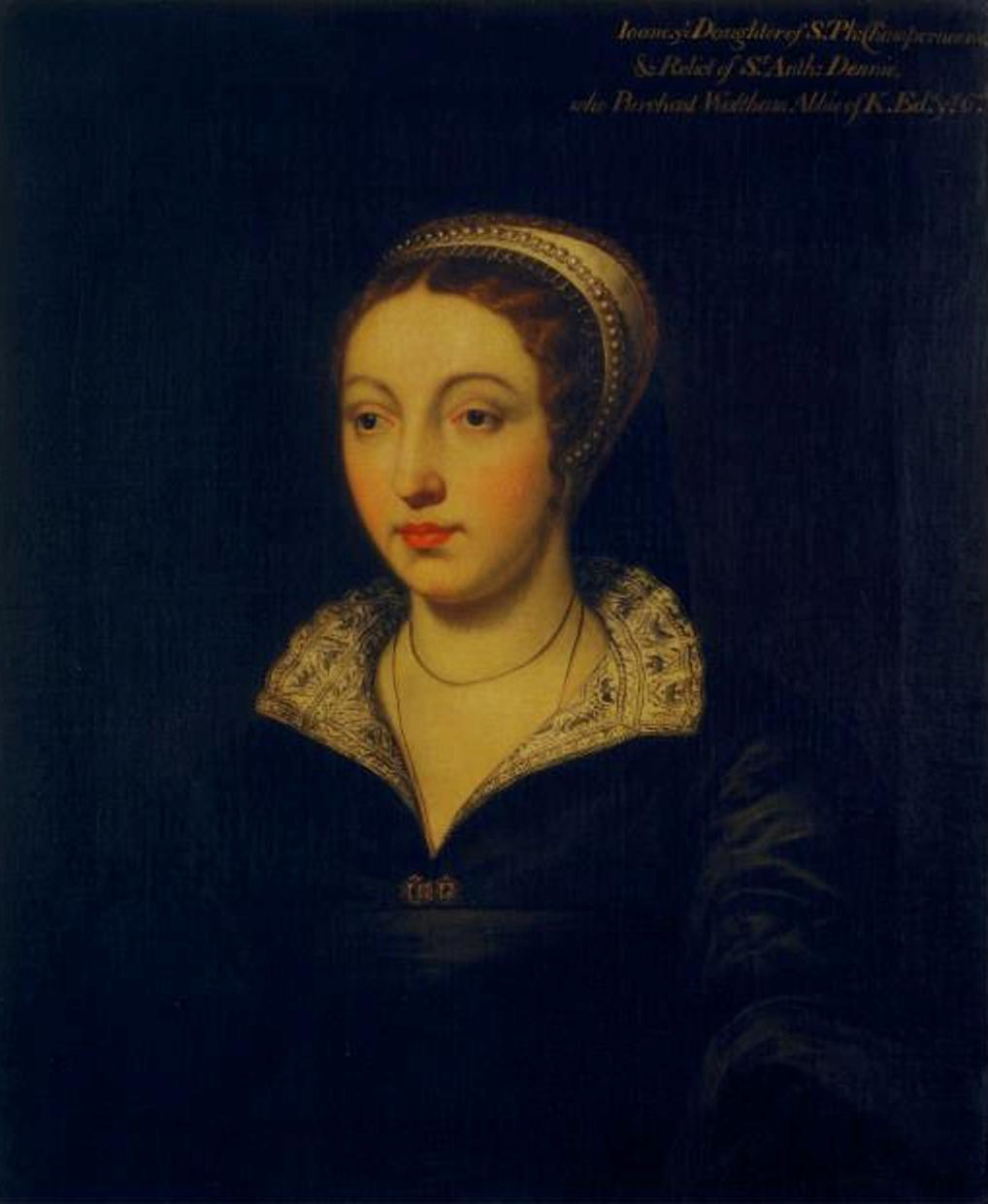
- Portrait of Joan Champernowne, Lady Denny (British School)
- Born: Modbury, Devon, England
- Died: 1553
- Spouse: Sir Anthony Denny (m. 1538; died 1549)
- Children: Henry Denny; Sir Edward Denny; 7 more
- Parents: Sir Philip Champernowne; Katherine Carew
- Relatives: Katherine Ashley (sister)

Joan Champernowne, Lady Denny (died 1553) was a lady-in-waiting at the court of King Henry VIII of England. She became the friend and lady-in-waiting to his sixth wife, Queen Catherine Parr.

== Life ==
Joan was born in Modbury, Devon on an unknown date, but no later than 1513, the daughter of Sir Philip Champernowne and his wife, Katherine Carew. She was the sister of Katherine Ashley née Champernowne, the governess of Queen Elizabeth I. Before her marriage, she served as maid-of-honour to Catherine of Aragon.

On 9 February 1538 she married Sir Anthony Denny, who at the end of King Henry's reign was widely considered to be his most trusted servant.

Joan was considered to be both beautiful and intelligent, and a member of the burgeoning Protestant faction at court along with her husband.

In August 1539, she and others ladies of the court visited Portsmouth to see a newly built ship. They sent Henry VIII a joint letter which was signed by Mabel, Lady Southampton, Margaret Tallebois, Margaret Howard (sister of Queen Catherine Howard), Alice Browne, Anne Knyvett (daughter of Thomas Knyvett), "Jane Denny", Jane Meutas, Anne Bassett, Elizabeth Tyrwhitt, and Elizabeth Harvey.

She was appointed lady-in-waiting to queen Catherine Parr, and became the personal friend of the queen.

=== Family ===
She had 5 sons and 4 daughters, including:

- Henry Denny, Dean of Chester (d. 24 March 1574). He married, firstly, Honory Grey, daughter of William Grey, 13th Baron Grey de Wilton and Lady Mary Somerset. His second wife was Elizabeth Grey, by whom he had a son, who died unmarried.
- Sir Edward Denny (died 12 February 1600), married Margaret Edgcumbe, daughter of Sir Piers Edgcumbe (1536 - c.1607), by whom he had issue.

The Tudor historian, Joanna Denny, was a descendant of Joan's.

== Sources ==
- Coros, D. F. (1982). "Denny, Anthony (1501-49), of Cheshunt, Herts.". In Bindoff, S. T. (ed.). The History of Parliament: the House of Commons 1509-1558 – via History of Parliament Online.
- Ellis, Henry (1825). Original Letters Illustrative of English History: Including Numerous Royal Letters; From Autographs in the British Museum, and One or Two Other Collections. Vol. 2 (2nd ed.). London: Harding and Lepard. pp. 126–127. OCLC 59530367.
- Hart, Kelly (2014). The Mistresses of Henry VIII. Stroud: The History Press. p. 187. ISBN 9780752462516. OCLC 893683404.
- Hutchinson, Robert (2006). The Last Days of Henry VIII: Conspiracy, Treason and Heresy at the Court of the DyingTyrant. London: Phoenix. ISBN 0-7538-1936-8. OCLC 1200487983.
- Knight, Leah; White, Micheline; Sauer, Elizabeth, eds. (2018). Women's Bookscapes in Early Modern Britain : Reading, Ownership, Circulation. Ann Arbor: University of Michigan Press. p. 29. doi:10.3998/mpub.9901165. ISBN 9780472124435. OCLC 1054260220.
- Merton, Charlotte (3 January 2008). "Astley [née Champernowne], Katherine (d. 1565)". Oxford Dictionary of National Biography (online ed.). Oxford University Press. doi:10.1093/ref:odnb/68016. (Subscription, Wikipedia Library access or UK public library membership required.)
- Mosley, Charles, ed. (2003). Burke's Peerage, Baronetage and Knightage. Vol. 1 (107th ed.). Wilmington: Burke's Peerage & Gentry LLC. ISBN 0971196621.
- Porter, Linda (2010). Katherine the Queen: The Remarkable Life of Katherine Parr. Pan Books. ISBN 978-0-330-46080-4.
- Sil, Narasingha P. (23 September 2004). "Denny, Sir Anthony (1501–1549)". Oxford Dictionary of National Biography (online ed.). Oxford University Press. doi:10.1093/ref:odnb/7506. (Subscription, Wikipedia Library access or UK public library membership required.)
- Weir, Alison (2018). Six Tudor Queens: Jane Seymour, the Haunted Queen. Headline. p. ?. ISBN 9781472227690. OCLC 1479944113.
