= Humphrey Gilbert =

English explorer, politician and soldier (c.1539–1583)

Sir Humphrey Gilbert
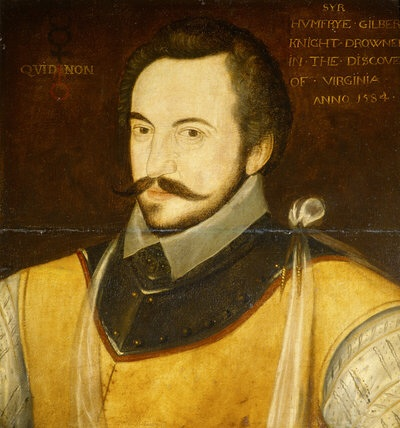
- Portrait at Compton Castle
- Born: c. 1539; Greenway, Brixham, England
- Died: 9 September 1583 (aged 43–44) waters off the Azores
- Education: University of Oxford
- Spouse: Anne Aucher (1548–1631) m 1570
- Children: 6 sons and 1 daughter
- Parents: Otho Gilbert; Catherine Champernowne

Signature
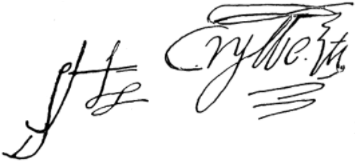

Sir Humphrey Gilbert (c. 1539 – 9 September 1583) was an English adventurer, explorer, member of parliament and soldier who served during the reign of Queen Elizabeth I and was a pioneer of the English colonial empire in North America and the Plantations of Ireland. He was a maternal half-brother of Sir Walter Raleigh and a cousin of Sir Richard Grenville.

== Biography ==
=== Early life ===
Gilbert was the 5th son of Otho Gilbert of Compton, Greenway and Galmpton, all in Devon, by his wife Catherine Champernowne, daughter of Sir Philip Champernowne. His brothers, Sir John Gilbert and Adrian Gilbert, and his half-brothers Carew Raleigh and Sir Walter Raleigh, were also prominent during the reigns of Queen Elizabeth I and King James VI and I. Catherine Champernowne was a niece of Kat Ashley, Elizabeth's governess, who introduced her young kinsmen to the court. Gilbert's uncle, Sir Arthur Champernowne, involved him in the Plantations of Ireland between 1566 and 1572.

Gilbert's mentor was Sir Henry Sidney. He was educated at Eton College and the University of Oxford, where he learned to speak French and Spanish and studied war and navigation. He went on to reside at the Inns of Chancery in London in about 1560–1561.

Gilbert was present at the siege of Newhaven in Havre-de-Grâce (Le Havre), Normandy, where he was wounded in June 1563. By July 1566, he was serving in Ireland during the Tudor conquest of Ireland, under the command of Sidney (then Lord Deputy of Ireland) against Shane O'Neill. He was then sent to England later in the year with dispatches for the Queen. At that point, he took the opportunity of presenting the Queen with his A Discourse of a Discoverie for a New Passage to Cataia (Cathay) (published in revised form in 1576), treating of the exploration of a Northwest Passage by America to China.

=== Military career in Ireland ===
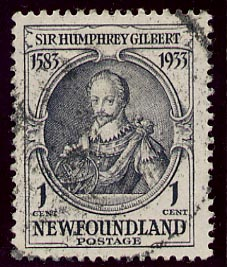
A stamp depicting Gilbert

After the assassination of O'Neill in 1567, Gilbert was appointed governor of Ulster and served as a member of the Irish Parliament. At about this time, he petitioned William Cecil, Queen Elizabeth's principal secretary, for a recall to England, citing "for the recovery of my eyes", but his ambitions still rested in Ireland and particularly in the southern province of Munster. In April 1569, he proposed the establishment of a presidency and council for the province and pursued the notion of an extensive settlement around Baltimore (at the southwest tip of modern County Cork), which was approved by the Dublin council. He was involved with Sidney and Secretary of State Thomas Smith in planning the Enterprise of Ulster, a large settlement in the east of the northern province of Ulster, by Devonshire gentlemen. On 1 January 1570, Gilbert was knighted for his services by Sidney.

Gilbert's actions in the south of Ireland played a part in the events that led up to the first of the Desmond Rebellions. Sir Peter Carew, his Devonshire kinsman, was pursuing a claim to the inheritance of certain lands within the Butler territories in south Leinster. The 3rd Earl of Ormonde, a bosom companion of Queen Elizabeth's from childhood and head of the Butler dynasty, was absent in England, and the clash of Butler's influence with the Carew claim fostered conflict. Carew seized the barony of Idrone (in modern County Carlow), the residence of the Irish King Art Óg Mac Murchadha Caomhánach.

In the summer of 1569, Gilbert was eager to participate, pushing westward with his forces across the River Blackwater and joined up with his kinsman to defeat Sir Edmund Butler, the Earl of Ormond's younger brother. Violence spread in a confusion from Leinster and across the province of Munster, when the Geraldines of Desmond, led by James FitzMaurice FitzGerald, rose against the incursion. Gilbert was then promoted to colonel by Lord Deputy Sidney and was charged with the pursuit of FitzGerald. The Geraldines were driven out of Kilmallock but returned to lay siege to Gilbert, who drove off their force in a sally during which his horse was shot from under him and his buckler transfixed with a spear. After that initial success, he marched unopposed for three weeks through Kerry and Connello, capturing thirty to forty castles. During this campaign, Gilbert's forces showed no quarter to all Irish people they came across, including women and children. Soldier and author Thomas Churchyard described an intimidation tactic implemented by Gilbert during the campaign:

The heddes of all those (of who sort soever thei were) which were killed in the daie, should be cutte off from their bodies and brought to the place where he incamped at night, and should there bee laied on the ground by eche side of the waie ledying into his owne tente so that none could come into his tente for any cause but commonly he muste passe through a lane of heddes which he used ad terrorem... [It brought] greate terrour to the people when thei sawe the heddes of their dedde fathers, brothers, children, kindsfolke, and freinds...

After the campaign, Gilbert retroactively justified his policy of attacking non-combatants by arguing that "The men of war could not be maintained without their churls and calliackes, old women and those women who milked their Creaghts (cows) and provided their victuals and other necessaries. So that the killing of them by the sword was the way to kill the men of war by famine." Once Ormond had returned from England and called in his brothers, the Geraldines found themselves outgunned. In December 1569, after one of the chief rebels had surrendered, Gilbert was knighted at the hands of Sidney in the ruined FitzMaurice camp, reputedly amid heaps of dead gallowglass warriors. A month after Gilbert's return to England FitzMaurice retook Kilmallock with 120 soldiers, defeating the garrison and sacking the town for three days. Three years later FitzMaurice surrendered.

=== Member of parliament and adventurer ===
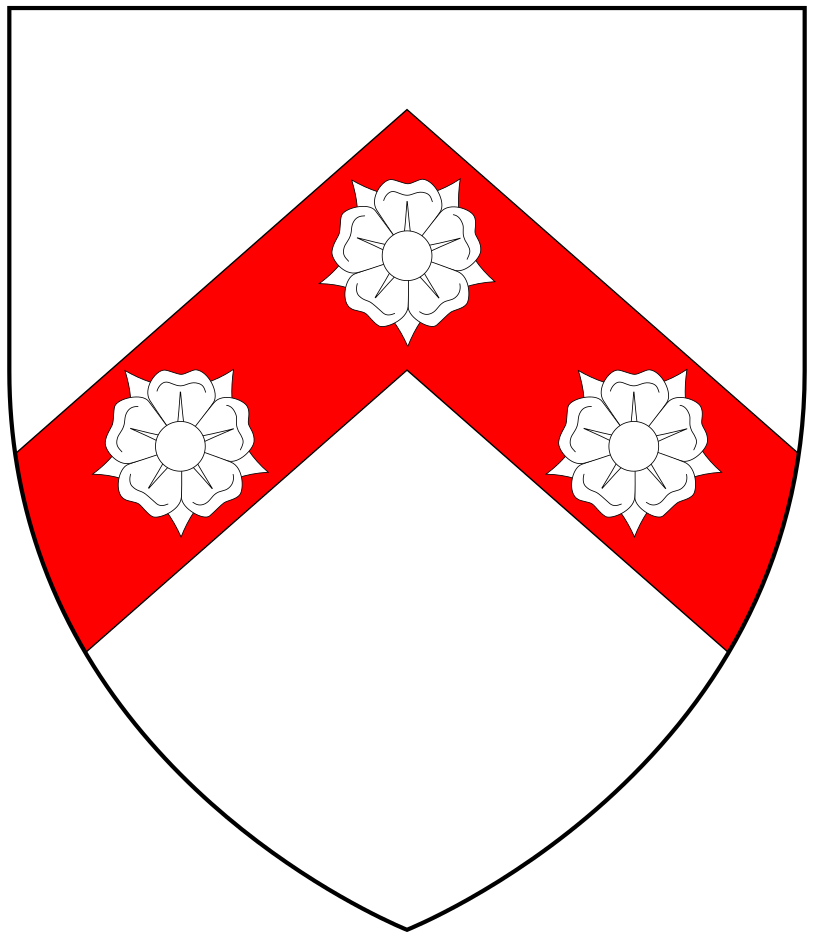
Arms of Gilbert

In 1570, Gilbert returned to England, where he married Anne Ager, daughter of John Ager (alias Aucher, etc.) of Otterden, who bore him six sons and one daughter. In 1571, he was elected to the Parliament of England as a member of parliament for Plymouth, Devon, and, in 1572, for Queenborough. He argued in favour of the crown prerogative in the matter of royal licences for purveyance. At this time he was involved with Thomas Smith and William Cecil in support of William Medley's alchemical project hoping to transmute iron into copper.

By 1572, Gilbert had turned his attention to the Spanish Netherlands, where he fought an unsuccessful campaign in support of the Dutch Sea beggars at the head of a force of 1,500 men, many of whom had deserted from Smith's aborted plantation in the Ards of Ulster. In the period 1572–1578, Gilbert settled down and devoted himself to writing. In 1573, he presented the Queen with a proposal for an academy in London, which was eventually put into effect by Sir Thomas Gresham with the establishment of Gresham College. Gilbert also helped to set up the Society of the New Art with William Cecil, 1st Baron Burghley and Robert Dudley, Earl of Leicester, both of whom maintained an alchemical laboratory in Limehouse.

The rest of Gilbert's life was spent in a series of failed maritime expeditions, the financing of which exhausted his family fortune. After receiving letters patent on 11 June 1578, Gilbert set sail in November 1578 with a fleet of seven vessels from Plymouth in Devon for North America. The fleet was scattered by storms and forced back to port some six months later. The only vessel to have penetrated the Atlantic to any great distance was the Falcon under Raleigh's command.

In the summer of 1579, William Drury, Lord Deputy of Ireland, commissioned Gilbert and Raleigh to attack James FitzMaurice Fitzgerald again by sea and land and to intercept a fleet expected to arrive from Spain with aid for the Irish. At this time, Gilbert had three vessels under his command: the 250-ton Anne Ager (named after his wife), the Relief, and the 10-ton Squirrell, a small frigate notable for having completed the voyage to America and back within three months under the command of a captured Portuguese pilot.

Gilbert set sail in June 1579 after a spell of bad weather and promptly got lost in the fog and heavy rain off Land's End, Cornwall, an incident which caused the Queen to doubt his seafaring ability. His fleet was then driven into the Bay of Biscay and the Spanish soon slipped past and sailed into Dingle harbour, where they made their rendezvous with the Irish. In October Gilbert put into the port of Cobh in Cork, where he delivered a terrible beating to a local gentleman, smashing him about the head with a sword. He then fell into a row with a local merchant, whom he murdered on the dockside.

Gilbert became one of the leading advocates for the then-mythical Northwest Passage to Cathay (China), a country written up in great detail by Marco Polo in the 13th century for its abundance of riches. Gilbert made a case to counter the calls for a Northeast Passage to China.

During the winter of 1566 he and a personal adversary of his, Anthony Jenkinson (who had sailed to Russia and crossed that country down to the Caspian Sea), argued the pivotal question of polar routes before Queen Elizabeth. Gilbert claimed that any northeast passage was far too dangerous: "the air is so darkened with continual mists and fogs so near the pole that no man can well see either to guide his ship or direct his course".

By logic and reason a north-west passage was assumed to exist, and Columbus had discovered America with far less evidence; it was imperative for England to catch up, to settle in new lands, and thus to challenge the Iberian powers. Gilbert's contentions won support and money was raised, chiefly by the London merchant Michael Lok, for an expedition. Martin Frobisher was appointed captain and left England in June 1576, but the quest for a north-west passage failed: Frobisher returned with a cargo of a black stone – which was found to be worthless – and a native Inuit.

=== Newfoundland and death ===
It was assumed that Gilbert would be appointed president of Munster after the dismissal of Ormond as lord lieutenant of the province in the spring of 1581. At this time Gilbert was a member of parliament for Queenborough, Kent, but his attention was again drawn to North America, where he hoped to seize territory on behalf of the English crown.

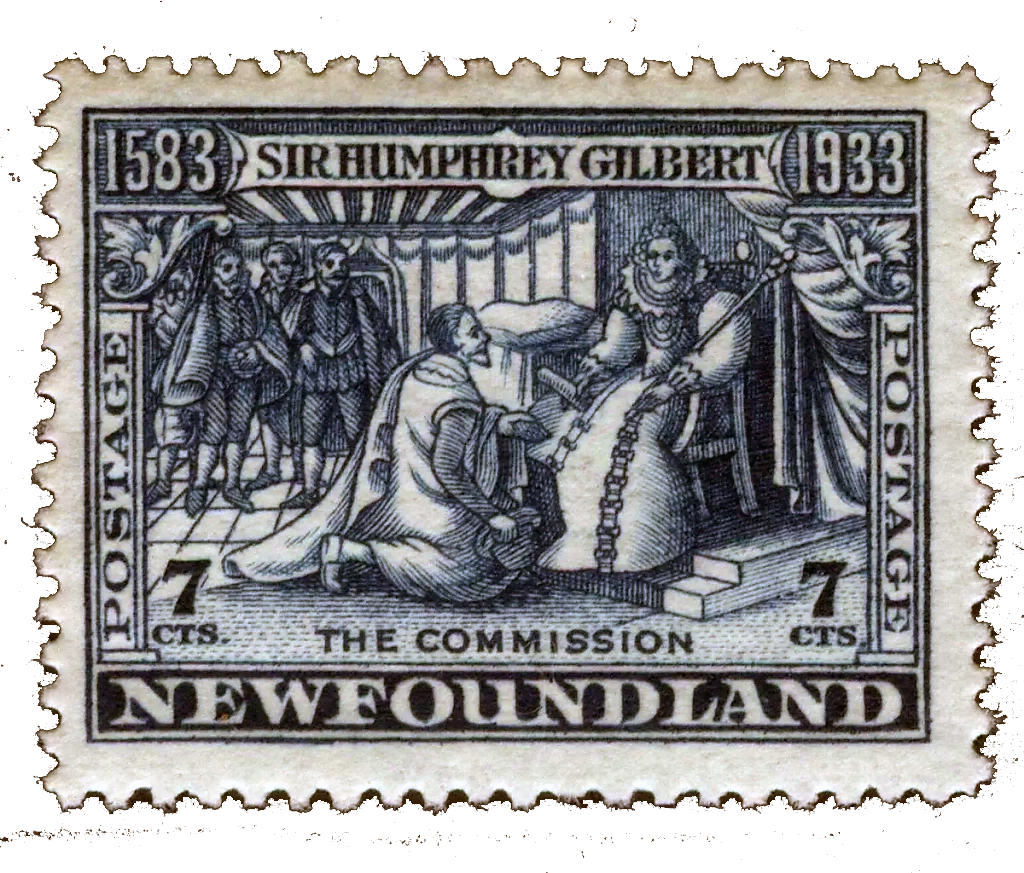
Newfoundland postage stamp of 1933 featuring Sir Humphrey Gilbert receiving letters patent from Queen Elizabeth I

The six-year exploration license Gilbert had secured by letters patent from the crown in 1578 was on the point of expiring, when he succeeded in 1583 in raising significant sums from English Catholic investors. The investors were constrained by penal laws in their own country, and loath to go into exile in hostile parts of Europe; the prospect of American settlement appealed to them, especially as Gilbert was proposing to seize some nine million acres (36,000 km^{2}) around the river Norumbega, to be parcelled out under his authority (although to be held ultimately by the Crown). However, the Privy Council insisted that the investors pay recusancy fines before departing, and Catholic clergy and Spanish agents worked to dissuade them from interfering in America. Shorn of his Catholic financing, Gilbert set sail with a fleet of five vessels in June 1583. One of the vessels – Bark Raleigh, owned and commanded by Sir Walter Raleigh – turned back owing to lack of victuals. Gilbert's crews were made up of misfits, criminals, and pirates, but in spite of the many problems caused by their lawlessness, the fleet reached Newfoundland.

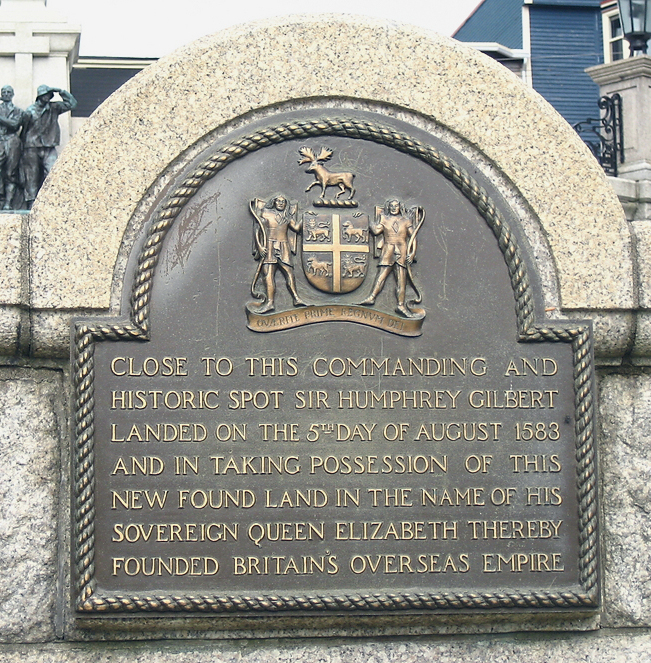
Plaque commemorating Gilbert's founding of the British Empire in St. John's, Newfoundland

On arriving at the port of St. John's, Gilbert was blockaded by the fishing fleet under the organisation of the port admiral (an Englishman) on account of piracy committed against a Portuguese vessel in 1582 by one of Gilbert's commanders. Once this resistance was overcome, Gilbert took possession of Newfoundland (including the lands 200 leagues to the north and south) for the English Crown on 5 August 1583. This involved the cutting of turf to symbolise the transfer of possession of the soil, according to the common law of England. The locals presented him with a dog, which he named Stella after the North Star. He claimed authority over the fish stations at St. John's and levied a tax on the fishermen from several countries who worked this rich sea near the Grand Banks of Newfoundland.

On 20 August his fleet departed for the river Norumbega region on the American mainland. During this voyage, Gilbert sailed on English ship Squirrel. He ordered a controversial change of course for the fleet. Owing to his obstinacy and disregard for the views of superior mariners, the ship Delight ran aground and sank with the loss of all but sixteen of its crew on one of the sandbars of Sable Island. Delight had been the largest remaining ship in the squadron (an unwise choice to lead in uncharted coastal waters) and contained most of the remaining supplies.

After discussions with Edward Hayes and William Cox, captain and master of Golden Hind respectively, Gilbert decided on 31 August to return to England. The fleet made good speed, clearing Cape Race after two days, and was soon clear of land. At some point in the voyage, a sea monster was sighted, said to have resembled a lion with glaring eyes. Gilbert had stepped on a nail on the Squirrel and on 2 September went aboard Golden Hind to have his foot bandaged and to discuss means of keeping the two little ships together on their Atlantic crossing. Gilbert refused to leave Squirrel and after a strong storm they had a spell of clear weather and made fair progress. Gilbert went aboard Golden Hind again, visited with Hayes and insisted once more on returning to Squirrel, even though Hayes insisted she was over-gunned and unsafe for sailing. Nearly 900 miles (1,400 km) away from Cape Race, near the Azores, they encountered high waves of heavy seas, "breaking short and high Pyramid wise", said Hayes.

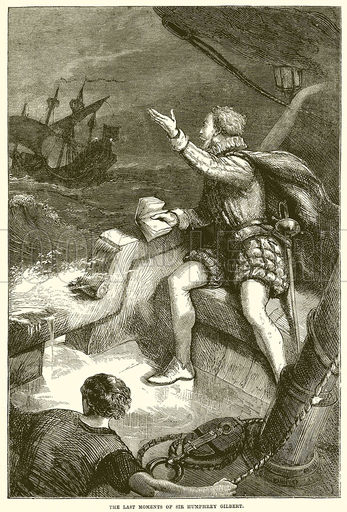
The last moments of Sir Humphrey Gilbert, by Edward Ollier (c. 1900)

On 9 September, Squirrel was nearly overwhelmed but recovered. Despite the persuasions of others, who wished him to take to the larger vessel, Gilbert stayed put and was observed sitting in the stern of his frigate, reading a book. When Golden Hind came within hailing distance, the crew heard Gilbert cry out repeatedly, "We are as near to Heaven by sea as by land!" as he lifted his palm to the skies to illustrate his point. At midnight the frigate's lights were extinguished and the watch on Golden Hind cried out "the Generall was cast away". Squirrel had gone down with all hands. It is thought Gilbert's reading material was the Utopia of Sir Thomas More, which contains the following passage: "He that hathe no grave is covered with the skye: and, the way to heaven out of all places is of like length and distance."

== Legacy ==
Gilbert was part of a prominent generation of Devonshire men, who combined the roles of adventurer, writer, soldier and mariner. A. L. Rowse writes of him as,

an interesting psychological case, with the symptoms of disturbed personality that often go with men of mark, not at all the simple Elizabethan seaman of Froude's Victorian view. He was passionate and impulsive, a nature liable to violence and cruelty – as came out in his savage repression of rebels in Ireland – but also intellectual and visionary, a questing and original mind, with the personal magnetism that went with it. People were apt to be both attracted and repelled by him, to follow his leadership and yet be mistrustful of him.

He was outstanding for his initiative and originality, if not for his successes, but it was in his efforts at colonisation that he had the most influence. In Ireland, Ulster and Munster were forcibly colonised by the English, and the American venture did eventually flourish. The formality of his annexation of Newfoundland eventually achieved reality in 1610. Perhaps of more significance was the issuance of a royal charter to Raleigh in 1584, based in part from Gilbert's earlier patent; with this backing, he undertook the Roanoke expeditions, the first sustained attempt by the English crown to establish colonies in North America.

Gilbert was the father of Ralegh Gilbert, who was to become second in command of the failed Popham Colony in Maine. Gilbert Sound near Greenland was named after him by John Davis.

Certain contemporaries speculated that he was a pederast. Sir Thomas Smith remarked that the only way to soothe his temper was to send a boy to him.

== Bibliography ==
- Canny, Nicholas P. (1973). "The Ideology of English Colonization: From Ireland to America". The William and Mary Quarterly. 30 (4): 575–598. doi:10.2307/1918596. ISSN 0043-5597. JSTOR 1918596.
- Gosling, William Gilbert (1911). The life of Sir Humphrey Gilbert : England's first empire builder. Constable and Co.
- Payne, Edward John. (1893, 1900). Voyages of the Elizabethan Seamen to America. 1, 2.
- Quinn, David B. (1966). The Elizabethans and the Irish. Cornell University Press.
- Ronald, Susan. (2007). The Pirate Queen: Queen Elizabeth I, her Pirate Adventurers, and the Dawn of Empire. HarperCollins: New York. ISBN 0060820667.
