= 1507 in England =

- Centuries: 14th; 15th; 16th; 17th; 18th
- Decades: 1480s; 1490s; 1500s; 1510s; 1520s
- See also: Other events of 1507

Events from the year 1507 in England.

== Incumbents ==
- Monarch – Henry VII
- Lord Chancellor – William Warham
- Lord Privy Seal – Richard Foxe
- Secretary of State – Thomas Ruthall

== Events ==
- 21 December – Henry VII arranges a marriage between his younger daughter, Mary Tudor and Habsburg Archduke Charles.

=== Date unknown ===
- Thomas More leaves England to study on the Continent having made enemies amongst Henry VII's senior advisors.

== Births ==
- Ralph Sadler, statesman (died 1587)
- Thomas Gale, surgeon (died 1586)
- Nicholas Arnold, courtier (died 1580)
- Henry Radclyffe, 2nd Earl of Sussex, nobleman (died 1557)

== Deaths ==
- 24 August – Cecily of York, princess (born 1469)
- 27 August – Elizabeth Somerset, Baroness Herbert, heiress (born 1476)
- 3 September – Thomas Savage, bishop and diplomat (born 1449)
