= 1506 in England =

- Centuries: 14th; 15th; 16th; 17th; 18th
- Decades: 1480s; 1490s; 1500s; 1510s; 1520s
- See also: Other events of 1506

Events from the year 1506 in England.

== Incumbents ==
- Monarch – Henry VII
- Lord Chancellor – William Warham
- Lord Privy Seal – Richard Foxe
- Secretary of State – Thomas Ruthall

== Events ==
- 16 January – Philip of Burgundy lands at Melcombe Regis after the fleet carrying him to Castile runs into a violent storm
- 9 February and 20 March – Treaties of Windsor ally England, Burgundy, and the Habsburgs against France. These are signed by Philip while held by Henry VII at Windsor Castle
- 24 April – After being extradited to England as part of Henry's agreement with Philip, Edmund de la Pole is imprisoned in the Tower of London as a rival claimant to the throne.

== Births ==
- 4 December – Thomas Darcy, Courtier (died 1558)
- Elizabeth Barton, nun (died 1534)
- Margaret Lee, confidante of Queen Anne Boleyn (died 1543)
- William Paget, 1st Baron Paget, statesman (died 1563)

== Deaths ==
- 6 September – Sir Richard Guildford, courtier (born 1450)
- 8 November – Edward Hastings, 2nd Baron Hastings (born 1466)
