= 1530s in England =

Events from the 1530s in England.

== Incumbents ==
- Monarch – Henry VIII

== Events ==
- 1530
  - 26 January – Thomas Boleyn, 1st Earl of Wiltshire, becomes Keeper of the Privy Seal.
  - January – the first printed translation of the Torah into English, by William Tyndale, is published in Antwerp for distribution in Britain.
  - 6 February – Charles Brandon becomes Lord President of the Council.
  - 31 March – Parliament of England passes the Egyptians Act in an attempt to expel Gypsies.
  - 4 November – Cardinal Wolsey is arrested as a traitor for secretly communicating with Pope Clement VII. He dies on 29 November around the age of 57 at Leicester while en route to London to face the charge.
- 1531
  - 11 February – Henry VIII is declared Supreme Head of the Church of England.
  - 31 March – Vagabonds Act 1530 (An Act directing how aged, poor and impotent Persons, compelled to live by Alms, shall be ordered; and how Vagabonds and Beggars shall be punished), first of the Tudor poor laws, receives royal assent, requiring registration of all genuine beggars with local Justices of Peace; unlicensed beggars to be whipped or pilloried.
  - July – Queen Catherine of Aragon is ordered to leave Windsor and go into exile in a succession of country residences and she is permanently separated from her daughter, Mary, who is moved to Richmond Palace.
  - Sir Thomas Elyot's treatise The Boke Named the Governour is published, the first English work concerning moral philosophy.
  - Construction of the Great Hall of Hampton Court begins.
- 1532
  - 17 March – Henry VIII grants the Thorne brothers a Royal Charter to found Bristol Grammar School.
  - 15 April – Submission of the Clergy: royal approval is required for all ecclesiastical laws.
  - 16 May – Sir Thomas More resigns as Lord Chancellor.
  - 20 May – Thomas Audley is appointed Lord Keeper of the Great Seal.
  - July – Thomas Cranmer, at this time ambassador to the Holy Roman Emperor, marries Margarete Preu.
  - 1 September – Anne Boleyn is created Marquess of Pembroke by Henry VIII.
  - 14 November – King Henry VIII secretly marries Anne Boleyn at Dover.
  - Stamford School is founded by William Radcliffe.
  - Construction of St James's Palace begins.
  - German painter Hans Holbein the Younger settles permanently in England.
- 1533
  - 25 January – King Henry VIII formally but secretly and bigamously marries Anne Boleyn, his second Queen consort, at Whitehall Palace.
  - 30 March – Thomas Cranmer is consecrated Archbishop of Canterbury in St Stephen's Chapel, Westminster, at the behest of the Boleyn family and with the authority of papal bulls.
  - 7 April – The Ecclesiastical Appeals Act 1532 (Statute in Restraint of Appeals) receives royal assent, declaring the king to be the supreme sovereign of England as a wholly independent "empire" and forbidding judicial appeals to the papacy.
  - 11 April – Henry VIII informs the Royal Council that Anne Boleyn must be recognized as his wife and queen. She is now pregnant with Elizabeth (although believing she has a son for the king).
  - 12 April (Easter Eve)
    - Anne Boleyn makes her first appearance as queen before the royal court at Greenwich.
    - Thomas Cromwell becomes Secretary of State.
  - 23 May – Henry VIII's marriage with Catherine of Aragon is officially declared annulled. Catherine refuses to accept this and continues to consider herself the wife of Henry until her death.
  - 28 May – Cranmer declares the marriage of Henry VIII and Anne Boleyn valid.
  - 1 June – Anne Boleyn is crowned Queen at Westminster Abbey, the culmination of four days of ceremonies.
  - 11 July – Pope Clement VII excommunicates Henry VIII and also Archbishop Cranmer.
  - 7 September – The future queen Elizabeth I is born to Henry VIII and Anne Boleyn at the Palace of Placentia in Greenwich.
  - Sumptuary law, An Act for reformation of excess in apparel, passed.
- 1534
  - 15 January – the English Reformation Parliament passes the Act Respecting the Oath to the Succession recognising the marriage of Henry VIII and Anne Boleyn, and their children as the legitimate heirs to the throne.
  - 30 March – Acts of Parliament are given royal assent:
    - Submission of the Clergy Act 1533, requiring Submission of the Clergy, that is, churchmen are to submit to the king, and the publication of ecclesiastical laws without royal permission is forbidden.
    - Buggery Act 1533, making buggery subject to capital punishment, the first time such acts have been legislated for outside the ecclesiastical courts.
  - 20 April – Elizabeth Barton, "The Nun of Kent", executed for making prophesies against King Henry.
  - 20 July – Cambridge University Press is given a Royal Charter by Henry VIII and becomes the first of the privileged presses.
  - 3 November–18 December – the Reformation Parliament passes the Act of Supremacy establishing Henry VIII as Supreme Head of the Church of England. The Treasons Act makes it treason, punishable by death, to disavow the Act of Supremacy.
  - 18 December – Suffragan Bishops Act authorises the appointment of suffragan (i.e. assistant) bishops in England and Wales.
  - Polydore Vergil's Anglica Historia is first published in Basel.
- 1535
  - January–May – Valor Ecclesiasticus: local commissioners survey the finances of religious establishments with a view to the imposition of a new tax by the Exchequer.
  - March – English forces under William Skeffington storm Maynooth Castle in Ireland, the stronghold of Thomas FitzGerald, 10th Earl of Kildare.
  - 4 May – first of the Carthusian Martyrs of London executed at Tyburn.
  - 20 May – William Tyndale arrested in Antwerp for heresy in relation to his Bible translation into English.
  - 22 June – execution of Cardinal John Fisher, Bishop of Rochester, on Tower Hill in London for his refusal to swear an oath of loyalty to Henry VIII.
  - 6 July – Sir Thomas More is executed for treason on Tower Hill after refusing to agree to Henry VIII's decision to separate the English church from the Roman Catholic Church.
  - August – Commissioners begin to survey religious establishments, starting in the west of England, preparatory to dissolution of the Monasteries.
  - 4 October – publication of Myles Coverdale's complete Bible translation into English in Antwerp is completed.
  - First of the Laws in Wales Acts passed, beginning the Anglicisation of the Welsh legal system.
  - Study of canon law at English universities prohibited.
  - First appointment to the chair of Regius Professor of Divinity, founded by King Henry VIII: Richard Smyth at the University of Oxford.
- 1536
  - 7 January – Catherine of Aragon, first queen of Henry VIII, dies aged 50 in banishment at Kimbolton Castle, holding to the last that she is the country's only rightful queen.
  - 24 January – The King is seriously injured in a fall from his horse at a jousting tournament in Greenwich, sustaining concussion.
  - 29 January
    - Catherine of Aragon is buried at Peterborough Abbey. Her daughter Mary is prohibited from attending the funeral.
    - Anne Boleyn has a miscarriage of a male child.
  - February – the Reformation Parliament passes the Suppression of Religious Houses Act ("Dissolution of the Lesser Monasteries Act"). It is presented with the Compendium Competorum, a list of supposed clerical abuses.
  - April – An Acte for Laws & Justice to be ministred in Wales in like fourme as it is in this Realme (27 Hen. 8. c. 26) further incorporates the legal system of Wales into that of England.
  - 14 April – the Reformation Parliament passes an Act for the Dissolution of the Monasteries. Religious houses closed as part of Henry VIII's dissolution include
    - Basingwerk Abbey
    - Bourne Abbey
    - Brinkburn Priory
    - Buildwas Abbey
    - Cartmel Priory
    - Dorchester Abbey
    - Dore Abbey
    - Haltemprice Priory
    - Keldholme Priory
    - Lindisfarne Priory
    - Tintern Abbey
    - Waverley Abbey.
  - The Court of Augmentations is set up to administer former religious revenues confiscated by the crown. The Vagabonds Act 1536 establishes the parish as the principal unit for administration of the Tudor Poor Laws.
  - May – William Tyndale's Bible publicly burned as heretical.
  - 2 May – Anne Boleyn is arrested and imprisoned in the Tower of London following an imprudent conversation with Henry Norris at court.
  - 14 May – Cranmer declares Henry's marriage to Anne Boleyn to be null and void.
  - 15 May – Anne Boleyn is tried and convicted in the Tower of London of adultery, incest and high treason.
  - 17 May – the five men accused of adultery with Anne Boleyn, including her own brother George Boleyn, are beheaded by axe on Tower Hill.
  - 19 May – Anne Boleyn is beheaded by sword in the Tower of London.
  - 20 May – Henry VIII's betrothal to Jane Seymour is made public.
  - 30 May – Henry VIII marries Jane Seymour privately at the Palace of Westminster. She is proclaimed queen on 4 June but a coronation is postponed and never takes place.
  - 11 July – Thomas Cranmer's Ten Articles are adopted by clerical Convocation as the English Church's first post-papal doctrinal statement.
  - 1 October – the Pilgrimage of Grace, a rebellion against Henry VIII's church reforms, begins as the Lincolnshire Rising at St James' Church, Louth, spreading to Yorkshire and other parts of the north.
  - 6 October – Bible translator William Tyndale is burned at the stake in Vilvoorde, Flanders.
  - 10 October – Robert Aske, a Catholic London barrister of Yorkshire family, becomes the leader of the Pilgrimage of Grace rebels, whose numbers have grown to 9,000, and marches with them to York.
  - 13 November
    - Robert Aske meets with royal delegates at York, including the Duke of Norfolk and negotiates the return of the homes of Catholic monks and nuns, as well as a safe passage for Aske and several Catholic representatives for a meeting with the King Henry VIII.
    - Robert Pakington, a London mercer and MP, becomes the first person in Britain to be murdered with a handgun, while he is crossing the street from his home. It is a very misty morning and his assailant is never caught, despite the offer of a large reward.
  - 5 December – The Pilgrimage of Grace ends at Pontefract Castle after the Duke of Norfolk promises to present a list of 24 Articles of the pilgrims' demands, "The Commons' Petition", to the King and pledges a reprieve for abbeys from dissolution until Parliament can meet, and to obtain a general pardon for the rebel pilgrims (although he is without authority to negotiate).
  - Sir Thomas Elyot's popular medical text The Castel of Helth is published.
- 1537
  - January – Bigod's rebellion, an armed insurrection by Roman Catholics in Cumberland and Westmorland against the king.
  - July – Pilgrimage of Grace: Robert Aske is executed along with over 200 other rebels, including canons of Hexham Abbey.
  - August – the King orders readings from the Bishop's Book (The Institution of the Christian Man), a doctrinal document drawn up by 46 bishops and other senior clergy meeting in February, to be made in churches; Henry also starts to revise it himself.
  - 25 August – the Honourable Artillery Company, the oldest surviving regiment in the British Army and the second most senior, is formed.
  - 12 October – Jane Seymour gives birth to Prince Edward, a male heir to Henry VIII, at Hampton Court Palace; he is christened on 15 October.
  - 15 October – Council of the North meets for the first time, in York.
  - 24 October – Jane Seymour dies of complications from childbirth at Hampton Court Palace; on 12 November she receives a royal burial in St George's Chapel, Windsor Castle.
  - Publication of complete Bible translations into English, both based on Tyndale's:
    - Myles Coverdale's 1535 text, the first to be printed in England (by James Nicholson in Southwark)
    - The Matthew Bible edited by John Rogers under the pseudonym "Thomas Matthew" and printed in Antwerp.
  - Continuing Dissolution of the Monasteries by Henry VIII, from late summer mostly by voluntary surrender, including
    - Bisham Priory (5 July, Bisham Abbey being founded by Henry in its place on 18 December to accommodate the Chertsey community)
    - Bridlington Priory
    - Castle Acre Priory
    - Chertsey Abbey
    - Furness Abbey
    - Lewes Priory
    - London Charterhouse
    - Valle Crucis Abbey
  - The Norfolk town of Bishop's Lynn becomes King's Lynn.
  - Publication of An Introduction for to Lerne to Recken with the Pen and with the Counters, the first known English translation of an arithmetic textbook, at St Albans.
- 1538
  - 2 May – Norwich Cathedral is dissolved as a monastic community.
  - 19 June – the newly founded Bisham Abbey is dissolved.
  - July – Blackfriars, Oxford, is dissolved
  - 5 September – parish registers introduced.
  - 21 September (3 a.m.) – Cromwell's commissioners for the Dissolution of the Monasteries destroy the shrine of St. Swithun in Winchester Cathedral.
  - 1 October – Whitefriars, Coventry, is dissolved
  - 28 October – a phial hitherto claimed to contain Blood of Christ is removed from its shrine at Hailes Abbey to be brought to London for critical inspection.
  - November – Austin Friars, London, is dissolved.
  - 30 November – Byland Abbey is dissolved.
  - Late – Shrine of Our Lady of Walsingham is dissolved.
  - John Bale's Kynge Johan is the earliest known English historical drama (in verse).
  - Sir Thomas Elyot's Dictionary is published.
- 1539
  - 12 January – Charles V, Holy Roman Emperor, and Francis I of France sign the Treaty of Toledo, agreeing to make no further alliances with the Kingdom of England.
  - 9 February – first horse race held at Chester Racecourse, the oldest in use in England.
  - March
    - Canterbury Cathedral surrenders, and reverts to its previous status of "a college of secular canons".
    - Invasion scare, following reports of an alliance between Spain, France and Scotland. The king orders construction of the 'Device Forts' for defence of the realm. Muster rolls are compiled in the counties.
    - Council of the West established.
  - April
    - Printing of the Great Bible (The Byble in Englyshe) is completed and it is distributed to churches. Prepared by Myles Coverdale, it contains much material from the Tyndale Bible (unacknowledged as this version is officially considered heretical).
    - Suppression of Religious Houses Act 1539 retrospectively legalises acts of voluntary surrender by the greater monasteries.
  - May – Parliament passes the Act of the Six Articles (An Act for the Abolishing of Diversity in Opinions) reaffirming certain Catholic principles in Henry VIII's Church of England.
  - 19 September – Dissolution of the Monasteries: Reading Abbey is suppressed and the Abbot, Hugh Cook Faringdon, indicted and hanged, drawn and quartered for treason, together with priests John Eynon and John Rugg, on 14 November. Also on 19 September, Glastonbury Abbey is suppressed by visitors without warning and Abbot Richard Whiting hanged on Glastonbury Tor on 15 November. The same fate befalls the abbot of St. John's Abbey, Colchester, Thomas Marshall, who is hanged on 1 December.
  - 4 October – a treaty is arranged for Henry VIII to marry Anne of Cleves.
  - Dissolution of the Monasteries – Barking Abbey, Bath Abbey, Beaulieu Abbey, Colchester Abbey, Godstow Abbey, Hyde Abbey, Winchester, Newstead Abbey, St Albans Abbey, St Mary's Abbey, York, St Mary's Priory and Cathedral, Coventry, and Syon Abbey, together with the Devonshire foundations of Dunkeswell Abbey, Hartland and Tavistock Abbeys and Plympton Priory, are dissolved. Hailes Abbey is surrendered on 24 December.
  - Game Place House in Great Yarmouth becomes the first premises to be used regularly as a public theatre.

== Births ==
- 1530
  - Thomas Hoby, diplomat and translator (died 1566)
  - Approximate date
    - Richard Tarlton, actor (died 1588)
    - Nicholas Sanders, Catholic propagandist (died 1581)
- 1531
  - September – Henry Stanley, 4th Earl of Derby (died 1594)
  - 14 November – Richard Topcliffe, landowner and Member of Parliament (died 1604)
  - John Popham, Lord Chief Justice of England (died 1607)
- 1532
  - 24 June – Robert Dudley, 1st Earl of Leicester, politician (died 1588)
  - Allen, cardinal (died 1594)
  - John Hawkins, navigator (died 1595)
  - Henry Percy, 8th Earl of Northumberland, nobleman and conspirator (suicide 1585)
  - Thomas Norton, lawyer (died 1584)
  - Approximate date – Ralph Lane, explorer (died 1603)
- 1533
  - 7 September – Queen Elizabeth I (died 1603)
  - Approximate date – Thomas Stafford aristocrat and rebel (executed 1557)
- 1534
  - 18 April – William Harrison, clergyman (died 1593)
  - 7 June – Amy Robsart, wife of Robert Dudley, 1st Earl of Leicester (died 1560)
- 1535
  - 28 May – Thomas North, translator (died c. 1604)
  - William Butler, physician (died 1617)
  - Jasper Heywood, translator of Seneca and theologian (died 1598)
  - Approximate date
    - Lord Guilford Dudley, son of John Dudley, Duke of Northumberland (executed 1554)
    - Robert Parsons, composer (died 1572)
- 1536
  - 10 March – Thomas Howard, 4th Duke of Norfolk, politician (executed 1572)
  - c. September – Laurence Chaderton, Puritan academic and churchman (died 1640)
  - Thomas Sackville, 1st Earl of Dorset, statesman and poet (died 1608)
  - Roger Marbeck, chief physician to Elizabeth I (died 1604)
  - Charles Howard, 1st Earl of Nottingham, statesman and admiral (died 1624)
- 1537
  - 28 June – Philip Howard, 20th Earl of Arundel, nobleman (died 1595)
  - 12 October – King Edward VI (died 1553)
  - 12 October or earlier – Lady Jane Grey, claimant to the throne of England (executed 1554)
  - Jane Lumley, translator (died 1578)
- 1538
  - 6 January – Jane Dormer, lady-in-waiting to Mary I (died 1612)
  - 21 September – Lewis Mordaunt, 3rd Baron Mordaunt, Member of Parliament (died 1601)
  - Approximate date – Henry Herbert, 2nd Earl of Pembroke, statesman (died 1601)

== Deaths ==
- 1530
  - 29 November – Cardinal Thomas Wolsey, statesman (born c. 1473)
- 1532
  - 31 January – Edward Sutton, 2nd Baron Dudley (born 1460)
  - May – Elizabeth Stafford, Countess of Sussex (year of birth unknown)
  - 22 August – William Warham, Archbishop of Canterbury (born 1450)
- 1533
  - 28 April – Nicholas West, bishop and diplomat (born 1461)
  - 25 June – Mary Tudor, Queen of France and English Princess (born 1496)
  - 4 July – John Frith, Protestant priest and martyr (born 1503)
- 1534
  - 20 April – Elizabeth Barton, nun (executed) (born 1506)
  - 8 November – William Blount, 4th Baron Mountjoy, scholar and patron (born c. 1478)
  - Sir Edward Guildford, Lord Warden of the Cinque Ports (born c. 1474)
  - Humphrey Kynaston, highwayman and outlaw (born c. 1474)
  - John Taylor, Master of the Rolls (born c. 1480)
- 1535
  - 4 May – John Houghton, Robert Lawrence, Augustine Webster, Prior and monks of the London Charterhouse, along with Richard Reynolds, Bridgettine monk of Syon (executed)
  - 22 June – John Fisher, Bishop of Rochester (executed) (born c. 1469)
  - 6 July – Sir Thomas More, lawyer, writer, and politician (executed) (born 1478)
  - September – George Nevill, 5th Baron Bergavenny (born 1469)
  - 31 December – William Skeffington, Lord Deputy of Ireland (born 1465)
- 1536
  - 7 January – Catherine of Aragon, queen of Henry VIII (born 1485)
  - 17 May – George Boleyn, Viscount Rochford, diplomat (born 1503)
  - 19 May – Anne Boleyn, queen of Henry VIII (executed)
  - 18 June – Henry Fitzroy, 1st Duke of Richmond and Somerset, illegitimate son of Henry VIII (born 1519)
  - 28 June – Richard Pace, diplomat (born 1482)
  - c. July – John Rastell, printer and author (born c. 1475)
  - 6 October – William Tyndale, Protestant scholar (burned at the stake) (born 1484)
  - 21 December – Sir John Seymour, courtier (born 1474)
- 1537
  - 29 June – Henry Percy, 6th Earl of Northumberland (born 1502)
  - 24 October – Jane Seymour, queen of Henry VIII (complications of childbirth) (born c. 1507)
- 1538
  - 3 April – Elizabeth Boleyn, Countess of Wiltshire (born c. 1480)
  - 8 May – Edward Foxe, churchman (born 1496)
  - 22 May – John Forrest, Franciscan friar (martyred) (born 1471)
  - 22 November – John Lambert, Protestant martyr (burned at stake) (year of birth unknown)
- 1539
  - 12 March – Thomas Boleyn, 1st Earl of Wiltshire, diplomat and politician (born 1477)
  - 8 September – John Stokesley, prelate (born 1475)
  - 14 November – Hugh Cook Faringdon, Abbot of Reading (hanged) (year of birth unknown)
