= List of Erasmus's correspondents =

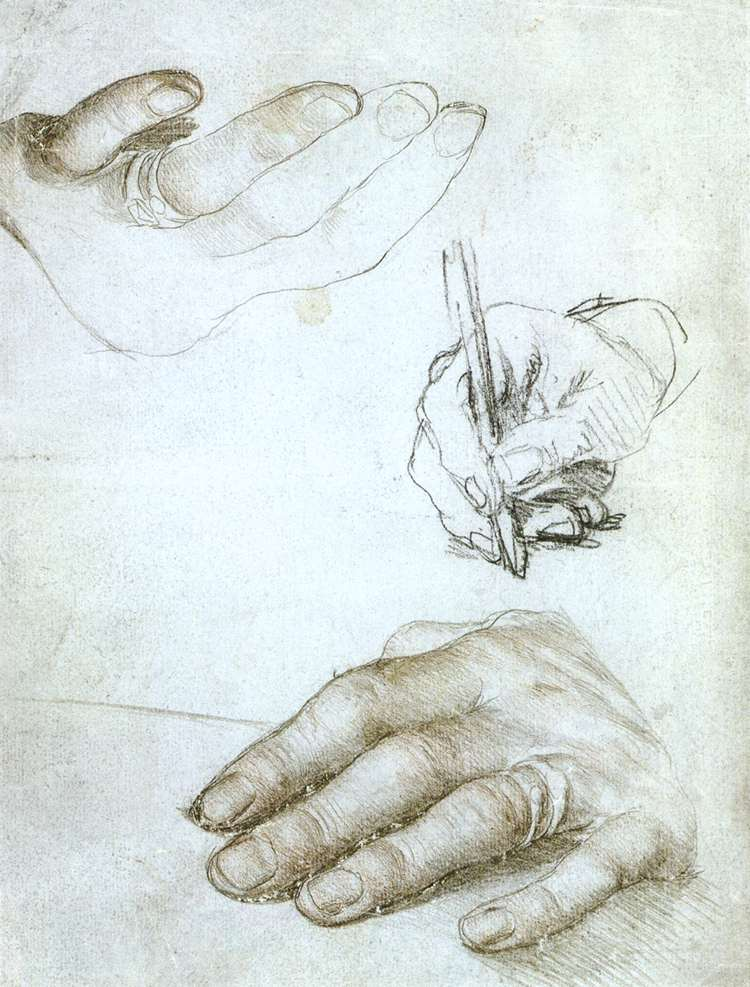
Hans Holbein der Jüngere; Studies of the Hands of Erasmus of Rotterdam, ca. 1523. (Louvre)

One of the best sources for the world of European Renaissance Humanism in the early sixteenth century is the correspondence of Erasmus. Historian Diarmaid MacCulloch has written that Erasmus should be considered the patron saint of networkers. Among those with whom he exchanged letters are:

- Pope Adrian VI
- Nicolaus Olahus
- Henricus Afinius (Hendrik van den Eynde)
- Georg Agricola
- Heinrich Cornelius Agrippa
- Cornelius Aurelius
- Albert of Brandenburg
- Faustus Andrelinus
- William Blount, 4th Baron Mountjoy -
  pupil of Erasmus, who called him
  inter nobiles doctissimus.
- William Budaeus
- Henry Bullock (Bovillus)
- William Burbank
- Henry Byers
- Lorenzo Campeggio
- John Claymond
- John Colet
- Martin Dorp
- Wolfgang Faber Capito
- John Fisher
- Richard Foxe
- Duke Frederick of Saxony
- Duke George of Saxony
- Damião de Góis
- Thomas Grey
- William Grocyn
- Henry VIII
- Ulrich von Hutten
- Justus Jonas
- William Latimer
- Edward Lee
- Pope Leo X
- Thomas Linacre
- Maarten Lips
- Thomas Lupset
- Martin Luther
- Aldus Manutius
- Philip Melanchthon
- Thomas More
- Petrus Mosellanus
- Johannes Oecolampadius
- Richard Pace
- Johann Reuchlin
- Beatus Rhenanus
- Servatius Rogerus
- Margaret Roper
- Georg Spalatin
- Peter Thaborita
- Cuthbert Tunstall
- Polydore Vergil
- Juan Luis Vives
- William Warham
- Thomas Wolsey
- Paracelsus
- Nicolaas Everaerts

== Editions ==
- P. S. Allen, ed. Opus epistolarum Des. Erasmi Roterodami, 12 vols (Oxford, 1906–1958) (in Latin)
- Collected Works of Erasmus (Toronto, 1976-), based on the Allen edition, with a small number of additions and emendations (in English)
