= 1504 in England =

- Centuries: 14th; 15th; 16th; 17th; 18th
- Decades: 1480s; 1490s; 1500s; 1510s; 1520s
- See also: Other events of 1504

Events from the year 1504 in England.

== Incumbents ==
- Monarch – Henry VII
- Lord Chancellor – William Warham
- Lord Privy Seal – Richard Foxe
- Secretary of State – Thomas Ruthall

== Events ==
- 18 February – Henry Tudor created Prince of Wales following the death of his elder brother Arthur, Prince of Wales two years earlier
- March – Private liveried retainers banned as part of a clampdown on the feudal tradition
- Silver shilling is the first English coin to be minted bearing a recognisable portrait of the King.

== Births ==
- Matthew Parker, Archbishop of Canterbury (died 1574)
- Nicholas Udall, playwright and schoolmaster (died 1556)
- John Dudley, 1st Duke of Northumberland, Tudor nobleman and politician (executed 1553)

== Deaths ==
- Thomas Stanley, 1st Earl of Derby (born 1435)
- John Paston, soldier and public official (born 1444)
- William Danvers, judge (born 1428)
