= 1505 in England =

- Centuries: 14th; 15th; 16th; 17th; 18th
- Decades: 1480s; 1490s; 1500s; 1510s; 1520s
- See also: Other events of 1505

Events from the year 1505 in England.

== Incumbents ==
- Monarch – Henry VII
- Lord Chancellor – William Warham
- Lord Privy Seal – Richard Foxe
- Secretary of State – Thomas Ruthall

== Events ==
- 28 June – planned marriage of Henry Tudor and Catherine of Aragon postponed when the dowry fails to arrive from Spain.
- Christ's College, Cambridge is granted a royal charter at the instigation of Lady Margaret Beaufort, the King's mother, refounding it under its present name.

== Births ==
- William Cavendish, courtier (died 1557)
- Philip Hoby, politician (died 1558)
- Thomas Wriothesley, 1st Earl of Southampton, politician (died 1550)
- Thomas Tallis, composer (died 1585)
- Christopher Tye, composer and organist (died 1572)

== Deaths ==
- George Grey, 2nd Earl of Kent, nobleman and soldier (born 1554)
- Robert Wydow, poet and church musician (born 1446)
- Sir Richard Pole, courtier (born 1462)
- William Boleyn, Lord Mayor of London (born 1451)
