= 1540s in England =

Events from the 1540s in England.

== Incumbents ==
- Monarch – Henry VIII (until 28 January 1547), then Edward VI
- Regent – Catherine, Queen Consort (starting 15 July, until 30 September 1544)
- Lord Protector – Edward Seymour, 1st Duke of Somerset (starting 4 February 1547, until 20 March 1549)

== Events ==
- 1540
  - 1 January – King Henry VIII meets Anne of Cleves in person for the first time, informally at Rochester.
  - 2 January – Gloucester Abbey is surrendered to the Crown as part of the Dissolution of the Monasteries.
  - 6 January – King Henry VIII marries German noblewoman Anne of Cleves, his fourth Queen consort.
  - 14 January – Southwark Priory in London is surrendered to the Crown as part of the Dissolution of the Monasteries.
  - 29 January – Bolton Abbey, a Yorkshire priory, is closed down as part of the Dissolution of the Monasteries.
  - January – Shap Abbey and Dunstable Priory are closed down as part of the Dissolution of the Monasteries.
  - 16 February – Thetford Priory is closed down as part of the Dissolution of the Monasteries.
  - 23 March – Waltham Abbey is the last abbey to close as part of the Dissolution of the Monasteries. Composer Thomas Tallis, a musician here, moves to Canterbury Cathedral.
  - April – the cathedral priories of Canterbury and Rochester are transformed into secular cathedral chapters, concluding the Dissolution of the Monasteries.
  - June – Anne of Cleves is banished from court to Richmond Palace.
  - 9 July – Henry's marriage to Anne of Cleves is annulled. She is given a generous settlement with several residences in England, is referred to as "the King's Beloved Sister" and will outlive him and all his other wives.
  - 24 July – Statute of Wills makes it possible to dispose of real estate by will.
  - 28 July – Thomas Cromwell is executed on order from the king on charges of treason in public on Tower Hill, London. Henry marries his fifth wife, Catherine Howard, on the same day at Oatlands Palace.
  - 30 July – at Smithfield, London, three Lutheran pastors, Robert Barnes, Thomas Gerrard and William Jerome, are burnt at the stake on a charge of heresy and three Roman Catholic priests, Thomas Abel, Richard Fetherstone and Edward Powell, are hanged, drawn and quartered on a charge of high treason.
  - Summer – Council of the West last sits.
  - 17 September – Anglican Diocese of Westminster formed.
  - Completion of the first of the Device Forts along the coast: Calshot, Deal, Sandgate, Sandown and Walmer Castles.
  - "Big Sun Year": Great heat and drought.
  - Regius Professorships endowed at the University of Cambridge.
  - Publication of The Byrth of Mankynde, the first printed book in English on obstetrics, and one of the first published in England to include engraved plates.
- 1541
  - 18 June – by the Crown of Ireland Act, the Parliament of Ireland declares King Henry VIII of England and his heirs to be Kings of Ireland, replacing the Lordship of Ireland with the Kingdom of Ireland.
  - Early summer – Collyer's School opens to scholars in Horsham.
  - 14 August – Anglican Diocese of Chester formed.
  - 3 September – Anglican Diocese of Gloucester formed from part of the Diocese of Worcester with John Wakeman (last Abbot of Tewkesbury) as first Bishop of Gloucester.
  - 1 November – the King receives allegations against Queen Catherine.
  - 23 November – Catherine is stripped of her title as queen and imprisoned in the new Syon Abbey, Middlesex.
  - 1 December – Thomas Culpeper and Francis Dereham are arraigned at Guildhall, London, for high treason because of their relationships with Catherine Howard; on 10 December they are executed at Tyburn.
  - Anglican Diocese of Peterborough formed.
  - The King's School, Canterbury; King's School, Chester; The King's School, Ely (known in modern times as King's Ely); King's School, Gloucester; The King's (The Cathedral) School, Peterborough; King's School, Rochester; and King's School, Worcester are established (or re-endowed) by Henry VIII. Berkhamsted School is founded by John Incent, Dean of St Paul's.
  - Portland Castle completed on the Isle of Portland.
  - John Brooke and Sons established at Armitage Bridge in West Yorkshire as textile manufacturers; the business will still exist in family hands into the 21st century.
- 1542
  - 7 February – Parliament passes a bill of attainder against Catherine Howard. The Royal Assent by Commission Act 1541 makes her guilty of treason.
  - 13 February – Catherine Howard, the fifth wife of Henry VIII, is executed by axe in the Tower of London.
  - 1 April
    - Unlawful Games Act 1541, prohibiting "Several new devised Games" as part of the promotion of archery, receives royal assent.
    - Witchcraft Act first defines witchcraft as a felony, punishable by death (repealed 1547).
  - 4 June – Anglican Diocese of Bristol formed from part of the newly created Diocese of Gloucester with Paul Bush as first Bishop of Bristol.
  - 24 August – Battle of Haddon Rig: Scottish victory over the English.
  - 4 September – earliest recorded Preston Guild Court in the modern sequence, which lasts unbroken until 1922.
  - September – Anglican Diocese of Oxford formed.
  - 24 November – Battle of Solway Moss: English victory over the Scots.
  - Completion of more Device Forts along the coast: Pendennis and St Mawes Castles in Cornwall, East Cowes Castle on the Isle of Wight and Sandsfoot Castle at modern-day Weymouth, Dorset. Muster rolls are compiled in the counties.
- 1543
  - 11 February – Henry allies with Emperor Charles V against France.
  - March – Consolidating Act of Welsh Union: Parliament establishes counties and regularises parliamentary representation in Wales.
  - 1 July – Treaty of Greenwich between England and Scotland (repudiated by Scotland 11 December).
  - 12 July – King Henry VIII marries his sixth and final wife, Catherine Parr, at Hampton Court Palace.
  - 4 August – three Protestant Windsor Martyrs suffer death by burning.
  - Composer Thomas Tallis becomes a Gentleman of the Chapel Royal.
- 1544
  - March – Third Succession Act, reinstating Princesses Mary and Elizabeth to the line of succession to the English throne, given Royal Assent (having been passed by Parliament in July 1543).
  - April – posthumous publication of Cardinal John Fisher's Psalmi seu precationes in the original and in an anonymous English translation by its sponsor, Queen Catherine Parr.
  - 3 May – Edward Seymour, Earl of Hertford captures Leith and Edinburgh from Scotland, start of the first major campaign in the Rough Wooing.
  - 19 July–18 September – Italian War of 1542–1546: Henry VIII leads the First Siege of Boulogne in France.
  - Thomas Cranmer's "Exhortation and Litany" is issued, the first officially authorised vernacular church service in English.
  - King's College Chapel, Cambridge, is completed.
  - Second programme of construction of Device Forts for defence of the Solent is ordered.
  - The Great Debasement of English coinage begins.
- 1545
  - 27 February – Scottish victory over the English at the Battle of Ancrum Moor.
  - 29 May – publication of Catherine Parr's Prayers or Meditations, the first book published by an English queen under her own name, and the King's Primer, another devotional work overseen by her.
  - July – Italian Wars: Attempted French invasion of the Isle of Wight.
  - 18–19 July – Battle of the Solent between English and French fleets. On 19 July, Henry VIII's flagship, the Mary Rose, sinks but the French are unable to land on the English mainland.
  - c.21 July – Battle of Bonchurch on the Isle of Wight: The French are defeated.
  - Sir Thomas Cawarden becomes the first Master of the Revels to be head of an independent office.
  - Roger Ascham's Toxophilus, the first book on archery written in English, is published.
  - Thomas Phaer's The Boke of Chyldren, the first book on paediatrics written in English, is published.
  - A Proper Newe Booke of Cokerye, one of the first known cookbooks in English written for the general reader, is first published.
  - First published edition of Sir John Fortescue's De laudibus legum Angliae (written c.1471).
- 1546
  - c. Spring – a warrant is drawn up by an anti-Protestant faction for the arrest of Queen Catherine, but she is rapidly reconciled with the King.
  - 24 April – Navy Board established.
  - 7 June – Treaty of Ardres ends the Italian War of 1542–1546; Henry VIII promises eventual return of Boulogne to France.
  - 4 November – Christ Church, Oxford, refounded as a college by Henry VIII under this name.
  - 19 December – Trinity College, Cambridge, founded by Henry VIII.
  - Regius Professorship of Hebrew at the University of Oxford established by Henry VIII.
- 1547
  - 19 January – execution of Henry Howard, Earl of Surrey, for treason.
  - 27 January – execution of Thomas Howard, 3rd Duke of Norfolk, father of Henry Howard, for treason is given royal approval but his life is spared by death of the king the following day.
  - 28 January – Henry VIII dies at the Palace of Whitehall and is succeeded as King by his 9-year-old son Edward VI, who is brought to Elsyng Palace at Enfield Town where his elder half-sister Elizabeth is in residence and they are both told the news.
  - 31 January – Edward Seymour becomes regent of England.
  - 20 February – Edward VI is crowned at Westminster Abbey.
  - 4 April – Catherine Parr, widow of King Henry VIII, secretly marries Thomas Seymour, 1st Baron Seymour of Sudeley.
  - 10 September – Battle of Pinkie: An English army under Edward Seymour, now the Duke of Somerset, defeats a Scottish army under James Hamilton, 2nd Earl of Arran, the Regent. The English seize Edinburgh.
  - 24 December
    - Treason Act makes it high treason to interrupt the line of succession to the throne established by the Act of Succession; and requires two witnesses to prove a charge of treason. It also repeals the Six Articles.
    - Dissolution of Colleges Act allows St Stephen's Chapel in the Palace of Westminster to become the meeting place of the House of Commons of England.
  - Edward Seymour begins the construction of Somerset House, London.
  - King James's School, Almondbury, West Yorkshire, is founded as a chantry school.
- 1548
  - 7 September – the funeral of dowager queen Catherine Parr, widow of Sir Thomas Seymour, in the chapel at Sudeley Castle (Gloucestershire) is the first in the British Isles to be held in the English language.
  - Dissolution of collegiate churches and chantries:
    - Beverley Minster in Yorkshire is suppressed as a collegiate church on Easter Sunday.
    - Howden Minster in Yorkshire is suppressed as a collegiate church.
    - Destruction of the religious colleges of Glasney and Crantock in Cornwall end the formal scholarship that has helped sustain the Cornish language and cultural identity.
  - King's School, Pontefract, re-founded.
  - John Bale writes Kynge Johan, the earliest English historical drama.
  - Edward Hall's The Union of the Two Noble and Illustre Families of Lancastre and Yorke ("Hall's Chronicle") is published posthumously.
- 1549
  - 15 January – Act of Uniformity imposes the Book of Common Prayer.
  - 14 March – Clergy Marriage Act 1548 receives royal assent, removing bars to clerical marriage.
  - 9 June
    - Book of Common Prayer (The Booke of the Common Prayer) introduced in churches.
    - Prayer Book Rebellion against the Book of Common Prayer breaks out at Sampford Courtenay in Devon and in Cornwall.
  - July – Kett's Rebellion in Norfolk against land enclosures; rebellion in Oxfordshire against landowners associated with religious changes.
  - 6 August – Prayer Book Rebellion: Battle of Clyst Heath – John Russell, 1st Earl of Bedford defeats rebels.
  - 8 August – France declares war on England.
  - 9 August – England declares war on France.
  - 17 August – Battle of Sampford Courtenay: Prayer Book rebellion quashed.
  - 27 August – Battle of Dussindale, near Norwich: Kett's Rebellion quashed.
  - 10 October – Edward Seymour, 1st Duke of Somerset loses the position of Lord Protector, John Dudley, Earl of Warwick assumes his powers but does not acquire the title.
  - 5 December – Cardinal Reginald Pole receives 26 votes at the Papal conclave, only two short of the requisite two-thirds majority to be elected as Pope.
  - December – Sternhold and Hopkins Psalter (Al such psalmes of Dauid as Thomas Sternehold ... didde in his life time draw into English Metre) is published.
  - The spire of Lincoln Cathedral is blown down.

== Births ==
- 1540
  - 24 January – Edmund Campion, Jesuit and Roman Catholic martyr (died 1581)
  - 25 February – Henry Howard, 1st Earl of Northampton, courtier and scholar (died 1614)
  - c. February or March – Sir Francis Drake, explorer and soldier (died 1596)
  - 11 June – Barnabe Googe, poet (died 1594)
  - William Byrd, composer (died 1623)
  - George Hastings, Earl of Huntingdon, nobleman (died 1604)
  - Christopher Hatton, politician (died 1591)
- 1541
  - Walter Devereux, 1st Earl of Essex, nobleman (died 1576)
- 1542
  - 5 May – Thomas Cecil, 1st Earl of Exeter, politician (died 1623)
  - 6 June – Richard Grenville, soldier and explorer (died 1591)
- 1543
  - 8 November – Lettice Knollys, noblewoman (died 1634)
  - Thomas Deloney, novelist and balladeer (died 1600)
  - Douglas Sheffield, Baroness Sheffield, née Howard, lover of Robert Dudley, Earl of Leicester (died 1608)
- 1544
  - April – Thomas Fleming, judge (died 1613)
  - 24 May – William Gilbert, scientist (died 1603)
  - Richard Bancroft, Archbishop of Canterbury (died 1610)
  - Thomas Hobson, carrier and origin of the phrase "Hobson's choice" (died 1631)
  - John Knewstub, Puritan (died 1624)
  - George Whetstone, writer (died 1587)
- 1545
  - 2 March – Thomas Bodley, diplomat and library founder (died 1613)
  - Nicholas Breton, poet and novelist (died 1626)
  - John Field, Puritan clergyman and controversialist (died 1588)
  - John Gerard, botanist (died 1612)
- 1546
  - 13 June – Tobias Matthew, archbishop of York (died 1628)
  - 24 June – Robert Persons, Jesuit priest (died 1610)
  - Thomas Digges, astronomer (died 1595)
- 1547
  - Peter Bales, calligrapher (died 1610)
  - George Carey, Baron Hunsdon, politician (died 1603)
  - Richard Stanyhurst, translator of Virgil (died 1618)
- 1548
  - William Stanley, soldier (died 1630)
- 1549
  - 12 July – Edward Manners, Earl of Rutland (died 1587)
  - 30 November – Sir Henry Savile, educator (died 1622)
  - John Rainolds, scholar and Bible translator (died 1607)

== Deaths ==
- 1540
  - c. January – Elizabeth Blount, mistress of King Henry VIII (born 1502)
  - 28 July – Thomas Cromwell, 1st Earl of Essex, statesman (executed) (born c. 1485)
  - 30 July
    - Thomas Abel, priest (martyred) (born c. 1497)
    - Robert Barnes, reformer (martyred) (born 1495)
- 1541
  - 27 May – Margaret Pole, Countess of Salisbury, courtier (executed) (born 1473)
  - 24 November – Margaret Tudor, daughter of King Henry VII and queen consort of James IV of Scotland (born 1489)
  - 10 December – Thomas Culpeper, courtier (executed) (year of birth unknown)
- 1542
  - 13 February – Catherine Howard, fifth wife of King Henry VIII (executed) (born c. 1522)
  - 3 March – Arthur Plantagenet, 1st Viscount Lisle, illegitimate son of King Edward IV (year of birth unknown 1461–1475)
  - 6 October – Thomas Wyatt, poet and diplomat (born 1503)
- 1543
  - 19 July – Mary Boleyn, mistress of Kings Francis I of France and Henry VIII of England (born 1500)
  - 20 September – Thomas Manners, 1st Earl of Rutland (born 1492)
  - October/November – Hans Holbein the Younger, painter (born c. 1497 in Germany)
  - Margaret Lee, lady-in-waiting, sister of poet Thomas Wyatt (born 1506)
- 1544
  - 30 April – Thomas Audley, 1st Baron Audley of Walden, Lord Chancellor (born 1488)
- 1545
  - April/October – William Latimer, churchman and scholar (born c. 1467)
  - May – Agnes Howard, Duchess of Norfolk, noblewoman (born c. 1477)
  - 24 August – Charles Brandon, 1st Duke of Suffolk, politician and husband of Mary Tudor (born c. 1484)
  - 18 October – John Taverner, composer (born c. 1490)
- 1546
  - 26 March – Thomas Elyot, diplomat and scholar (born c. 1496)
  - 16 July – Anne Askew, Protestant (burned at the stake) (born 1521)
- 1547
  - 19 January – Henry Howard, Earl of Surrey, nobleman, politician and poet (executed) (born c.1517)
  - 28 January – King Henry VIII (born 1491)
  - c. May – Edward Hall, chronicler and lawyer (born c.1496)
  - October or November – John Redford, composer, poet and playwright (born c. 1500)
- 1548
  - 7 September – Catherine Parr, dowager queen consort of Henry VIII (complications from childbirth) (born c. 1512)
- 1549
  - 10 March – Thomas Seymour, 1st Baron Seymour of Sudeley, politician and diplomat (born 1508)
  - April – Andrew Boorde, traveller (born 1490)
  - 15 April – Henry Somerset, Earl of Worcester (born 1496)
  - 7 December – Robert Kett, rebel (executed) (year of birth unknown)
