= 1510s in England =

Events from the 1510s in England.

== Incumbents ==
- Monarch – Henry VIII
- Regent – Catherine, Queen Consort (starting 30 June, until 22 October 1513)

== Events ==
- 1510
  - c. January – Erasmus begins his period of residence in Cambridge.
  - 21 January – Parliament grants Henry VIII generous tax subsidies.
  - 31 January – Catherine of Aragon miscarries her first child, a daughter, at about six months gestation; told she is still carrying a twin, she prepares for a birth in March–April but there is no child.
  - 17 August – Richard Empson and Edmund Dudley executed for "constructive treason".
- 1511
  - 1 January – Catherine of Aragon gives birth to Henry VIII's eldest son, Henry, Duke of Cornwall, at Richmond Palace but he dies on 22 February.
  - 9 April – St John's College, Cambridge, receives its charter.
  - July – Henry VIII's flagship the Mary Rose launched at Portsmouth.
  - 13 November – War of the League of Cambrai: Henry joins the Holy League against France.
  - 17 November – the Treaty of Westminster signed between England and Spain forming an alliance against France.
  - Archery Act 1511 (3 Hen. 8. c. 3) attempts to ensure competence in use of the English longbow by most adult males.
  - Edward Stafford, 3rd Duke of Buckingham, begins reconstruction of Thornbury Castle in South Gloucestershire as a residence.
  - Major fire at Sherston, Wiltshire.
- 1512
  - February – following Strode's case – that of Member of Parliament Richard Strode imprisoned by a stannary court due to his attempts to introduce a bill alleviating the harsh conditions of tin miners – Parliament passes an act granting MPs immunity from such prosecutions.
  - March – Parliament authorises a new poll tax to pay for the War of the League of Cambrai.
  - 10 August – War of the League of Cambrai: the English fleet, commanded by Admiral Sir Edward Howard, secures victory at the Battle of Saint-Mathieu over the French-Breton fleet, though with loss of its flagship, the Regent, through explosion.
  - Woolwich Dockyard established for the Royal Navy.
  - Boys aged from 7 upwards are required to be instructed in archery.
  - Wolverhampton Grammar School is founded by Sir Stephen Jenyns.
- 1513
  - 5 April – Treaty of Mechlin signed by Henry, Maximilian I, Holy Roman Emperor, Ferdinand II of Aragon and Pope Leo X against France.
  - 30 April – execution of Edmund de la Pole, 3rd Duke of Suffolk.
  - 11 June – Henry appoints Catherine of Aragon as Regent, Governor and Captain General in England while he campaigns in France.
  - July – War of the League of Cambrai: Scotland declares war on England, in breach of the Treaty of Perpetual Peace.
  - 25 July – Scotland's Earl of Arran departs from the Firth of Forth with 22 ships on a plan to join France in cutting off England's communications with the rest of Europe.
  - 16 August – War of the League of Cambrai: Henry VIII leads his troops to victory over French cavalry at the Battle of the Spurs (Second Battle of Guinegate) in Artois.
  - 23 August – Thérouanne in the north of France is given to Henry VIII after a treaty is concluded in the aftermath of the Battle of the Spurs.
  - 9 September – War of the League of Cambrai: at the Battle of Flodden, King James IV of Scotland is defeated and killed by an English army under Thomas Howard, Earl of Surrey. Catherine of Aragon learns of this victory while near Buckingham, having ridden north from London to address a speech of encouragement to troops gathering to march to Scotland.
  - c. 17 September – Catherine of Aragon delivers a son who either miscarries, is stillborn or lives only a few hours.
  - 24 September – War of the League of Cambrai: the city of Tournai surrenders to England.
  - Deptford Dockyard established for the Royal Navy.
- 1514
  - April – Henry VIII declares a truce with France in the War of the League of Cambrai.
  - 20 May – Trinity House is established as a guild of mariners at Deptford to regulate pilotage.
  - June – Battle of Hornshole in the Scottish Borders: young men from Hawick defeat a raiding party from England.
  - 13 June – Henry Grace à Dieu, at over 1,000 tons the largest warship in the world at this time, built at the new Woolwich Dockyard, is dedicated at Erith.
  - 7 August – Henry VIII concludes an independent peace treaty with France in the War of the League of Cambrai, negotiated by Thomas Wolsey.
  - 15 September – Thomas Wolsey is appointed Archbishop of York and begins to build York House in London.
  - 9 October – marriage of Louis XII of France and Mary Tudor (sister of Henry VIII) as part of the peace with France.
  - November/December – Catherine of Aragon delivers a stillborn son of Henry VIII.
- 1515
  - 2 July – Manchester Grammar School endowed by Hugh Oldham, the first free grammar school in England.
  - 10 September – Thomas Wolsey is invested as a Cardinal (Catholic Church).
  - 24 December – Wolsey is named the Lord Chancellor.
  - Wolsey commissions the rebuilding of Hampton Court Palace.
  - Structural completion of King's College Chapel, Cambridge.
- 1516
  - Gillingham School founded in Dorset.
  - c. December – Thomas More's Utopia is first published (in Latin at Leuven).
- 1517
  - 1 March – Corpus Christi College, Oxford, established by Richard Foxe.
  - 1 May – Evil May Day riots in London against foreigners.
  - A third epidemic of sweating sickness hits Oxford and Cambridge.
- 1518
  - 18 February – Catherine of Aragon gives birth to the King's daughter, who will become queen regnant Mary I of England, at the Palace of Placentia, Greenwich.
  - August – construction of the Manchester Grammar School is completed.
  - 23 September – Royal College of Physicians founded in London.
  - 3 October – Cardinal Wolsey's Treaty of London is signed by France, England, the Holy Roman Empire, the Papacy, Spain, Burgundy and the Netherlands allying the European powers against the Ottoman Empire.
- 1519
  - May – Henry VIII stands as a candidate in the election of the Holy Roman Emperor.
  - 15 May – official opening of Saint George's Chapel at Windsor Castle.
  - Henry VII's Chapel at Westminster Abbey completed.

== Births ==
- 1510
  - 6 October
    - John Caius, physician (died 1573)
    - Rowland Taylor, Protestant martyr (died 1555)
  - 28 December – Nicholas Bacon, Lord Keeper (died 1579)
- 1511
  - 1 January – Henry, Duke of Cornwall, eldest son of Henry VIII (died 22 February)
- 1512
  - August ? – Catherine Parr, queen consort (died 1548)
  - Edward Clinton, 1st Earl of Lincoln, admiral (died 1585)
- 1513
  - 23 December – Thomas Smith, scholar and diplomat (died 1577)
  - Elizabeth Seymour, sister-in-law of Henry VIII (died 1563)
  - Thomas Watson, Catholic bishop (died 1584)
- 1514
  - 16 June – John Cheke, classical scholar and statesman (died 1557)
- 1515
  - 15 June – Anne Herbert, Countess of Pembroke, born Anne Parr (died 1552)
  - 22 September – Anne of Cleves, German-born fourth queen of Henry VIII (died 1557)
  - 8 October – Margaret Douglas, member of the royal family, diplomat (died 1578)
  - approx. date
    - Roger Ascham, scholar and didactic writer (died 1568)
    - William Baldwin, writer, editor and theatrical director (died c.1563)
    - Leonard Digges, mathematician and surveyor (died c.1559)
    - Thomas Seckford, lawyer and royal court official (died 1587)
    - Edward Sutton, 4th Baron Dudley (died 1586)
- 1516
  - 18 February – Queen Mary I of England (died 1558)
  - approx. date – Laurence Nowell, antiquarian (died 1571)
- 1517
  - 17 January – Henry Grey, 1st Duke of Suffolk, politician and courtier (executed 1554)
  - 16 July – Frances Grey, Duchess of Suffolk, granddaughter of Henry VII (died 1559)
  - approx. date – Henry Howard, Earl of Surrey, aristocrat and poet (executed 1547)
- 1518
  - approx. date – Edmund Plowden, legal scholar (died 1585)
- 1519
  - c. 15 June – Henry FitzRoy, Duke of Richmond and Somerset, illegitimate son of Henry VIII (died 1536)
  - approx. date
    - Thomas Gresham, merchant and financier (died 1579)
    - Nicholas Grimald, poet (died 1562)
    - Edwin Sandys, bishop (died 1588)

== Deaths ==
- 1510
  - 17 August
    - Edmund Dudley, statesman, executed (born c. 1462 or 1471/2)
    - Richard Empson, statesman, executed (year of birth unknown)
- 1511
  - 11 February – Henry, Duke of Cornwall, eldest son of Henry VIII (born 1 January)
- 1513
  - 10 March – John de Vere, 13th Earl of Oxford, general (born 1443)
  - 30 April – Edmund de la Pole, 3rd Duke of Suffolk, executed (born c. 1471)
  - 27 October – George Manners, 11th Baron Ros, nobleman (year of birth unknown)
  - Robert Fabyan, chronicler (year of birth unknown)
- 1514
  - 2 January – William Smyth, bishop and statesman (born 1460)
  - December – Henry, Duke of Cornwall, third son of Henry VIII (stillborn)
- 1516
  - 25 April – John Yonge, diplomat (born 1467)
- 1518
  - 20 November – Marmaduke Constable, soldier (born c. 1455)
- 1519
  - 10 September – John Colet, churchman and educator (born 1467)
  - William Grocyn, scholar (born 1446)
