= 1570s in England =

Events from the 1570s in England.

== Incumbents ==
- Monarch – Elizabeth I

== Events ==
- 1570
  - 25 February – Pope Pius V excommunicates Queen Elizabeth I of England with the papal bull Regnans in Excelsis which is affixed to the door of Old St Paul's Cathedral in London on 24 May.
  - Florentine banker Roberto di Ridolfi devises the Ridolfi plot to assassinate Elizabeth and replace her with her Catholic cousin Mary, Queen of Scots.
  - Whitechapel Bell Foundry known to be in existence in London. By 2017, when it closes its premises in Whitechapel, it will be the oldest manufacturing company in Great Britain.
  - The home and library of John Dee at Mortlake begin to serve as an informal prototype English academy for gentlemen with scientific interests.
  - Approximate date – Thomas Tallis composes his 40-part motet Spem in alium.
- 1571
  - 23 January – the Royal Exchange, London, is officially opened by Queen Elizabeth.
  - April – Treason Act forbids criticism of the monarchy.
  - May – All papal bulls are declared treasonable by Act of Parliament.
  - 25 June
    - An Act Against Usury permits moneylending at interest rates not exceeding 10%.
    - Queen Elizabeth's Grammar School, Horncastle, is founded in Lincolnshire.
  - 27 June – Establishment of Jesus College "within the City and University of Oxford of Queen Elizabeth's foundation" by Welsh cleric and lawyer Hugh Price.
  - 25 July – The Free Grammar School of Queen Elizabeth of the Parishioners of the Parish of Saint Olave in the County of Surrey is established in Tooley Street, London.
  - 29 August – Ridolfi plot discovered. On 7 September Thomas Howard, 4th Duke of Norfolk, is arrested for his part in the conspiracy.
  - The first Pro forma bill is introduced, symbolising Parliament's authority over its own affairs.
  - Burford School is established in Oxfordshire.
- 1572
  - 13 February – Harrow School is founded by local landowner John Lyon under royal charter.
  - May – Hexhamshire is annexed to Northumberland.
  - 2 June – Thomas Howard, 4th Duke of Norfolk, is executed for treason for his part in the Ridolfi plot to restore Catholicism in England.
  - 11 July – Humphrey Gilbert leads 1500 English volunteers on an expedition to assist the Dutch Sea Beggars in their struggle against Spanish Habsburg rule.
  - Formation of 'Thomas Morgan's Company of Foot', a group of 300 volunteers from the London Trained Bands to assist the Dutch, origin of the Buffs (Royal East Kent Regiment).
  - Vagabonds Act, part of the Tudor Poor Laws, prescribes punishment for rogues. This includes actors' companies lacking formal patronage.
  - Publication of a revised version of the Bishops' Bible.
- 1573
  - 24 March – Queen Elizabeth's Grammar School for Boys established in Barnet at the petition of Robert Dudley, 1st Earl of Leicester.
  - 17 April – English troops capture Edinburgh Castle.
  - 18 December – Francis Walsingham becomes Secretary of State.
  - Humphrey Gilbert produces his proposal for The erection of an achademy in London for educacion of her Maiestes wardes, and others the youth of nobility and gentlemen [sic].
- 1574
  - 18 August – Treaty of Bristol settles commercial disputes with Spain.
  - The Queen grants freedom to any remaining villeins on crown lands, ending serfdom in England.
  - Construction of Longleat House completed.
- 1575
  - March – Spain opens the port of Antwerp to English traders, in return for Queen Elizabeth agreeing to stop aiding Dutch rebels against Spanish rule.
  - 7 July – Raid of the Redeswire: Sir John Carmichael of Scotland defeats Sir John Forster of England in a border skirmish which will be the last battle between the two kingdoms.
  - 26 July – Edmund Grindal succeeds Matthew Parker as Archbishop of Canterbury.
  - 14 November – Elizabeth declines an offer of rule over the Netherlands.
  - Christopher Saxton publishes his County Atlas of England and Wales.
  - William Byrd and Thomas Tallis are granted a royal monopoly for the publication of most types of music (notwithstanding that both are Catholic).
- 1576
  - 8 February – Peter Wentworth is imprisoned for speaking in Parliament against royal interference in its affairs.
  - 11 August – Explorer Martin Frobisher discovers Frobisher Bay whilst searching for the Northwest Passage.
  - December – James Burbage opens London's second permanent public playhouse (and the first to have a substantial life), The Theatre, in Shoreditch.
  - The following schools are founded in Kent:
    - Dartford Grammar School, by William d'Aeth, Edward Gwyn and William Vaughn.
    - Sutton Valence School, by William Lambe.
  - William Lambarde's Perambulation of Kent (completed 1570) is published, first of the English county histories.
  - Composer Thomas Whythorne writes a Booke of songs and sonetts with longe discourses sett with them, an early example of autobiographical writing in English.
- 1577
  - June – Edmund Grindal suspended for refusing to suppress Puritanism.
  - 6 July – 'Black Assize' in Oxford results in an outbreak of epidemic typhus killing around three hundred in the city.
  - 29 November – Catholic seminary priest Cuthbert Mayne is hanged, drawn and quartered at Launceston, Cornwall, for treason, first of the 158 Douai Martyrs.
  - 13 December – Francis Drake leaves Plymouth aboard the Pelican with four other ships and 164 men on an expedition against the Spanish along the Pacific coast of the Americas which will become a circumnavigation.
  - Woodbridge School is founded in Suffolk.
- 1578
  - 11 June – Humphrey Gilbert is granted letters patent to establish a colony in North America.
  - 19 November – Humphrey Gilbert and Walter Raleigh set out from Plymouth leading an expedition to establish a colony in North America; they are forced to turn back six months later.
  - December – Publication of John Lyly's didactic prose romance Euphues: the Anatomy of Wyt, originating the ornate prose style known as Euphuism.
- 1579
  - 23 April – The English College, Rome, is established for the training of Roman Catholic priests to serve in England.
  - 17 June – Drake claims New Albion on the Pacific coast of North America for England.
  - June – Humphrey Gilbert sails in an unsuccessful attempt to intercept Spanish forces sailing to support the Second Desmond Rebellion in Ireland.
  - 17 August – Eastland Company chartered to trade with Scandinavia and the Baltic Sea states.
  - Publication of Edmund Spenser's poetry The Shepheardes Calender, anonymously.

== Births ==
- 1570
  - 22 January – Robert Bruce Cotton, politician (died 1631)
  - 13 April – Guy Fawkes, Gunpowder Plot conspirator (hanged 1606)
  - 28 November – James Whitelocke, judge (died 1632)
  - John Cooper, composer and lutenist (died 1626)
  - John Farmer, composer (died 1601)
  - Simon Grahame, Scottish-born adventurer (died 1614)
- 1571
  - ? March – Barnabe Barnes, poet (died 1609)
  - Henry Ainsworth, Nonconformist clergyman and scholar (died 1622)
  - William Bedell, Anglican churchman (died 1642)
  - Charles Butler, beekeeper and philologist (died 1647)
  - Bartholomew Gosnold, lawyer and explorer (died 1607)
  - Thomas Storer, poet (died 1604)
  - Thomas Wintour, Gunpowder Plot conspirator (hanged 1606)
- 1572
  - 22 January – John Donne, writer and prelate (died 1631)
  - c. 3 March – Robert Catesby, leader of the Gunpowder Plot (killed 1605)
  - 11 June – Ben Jonson, dramatist (died 1637)
  - John Floyd, Jesuit (died 1649)
  - James Mabbe, scholar and poet (died 1642)
- 1573
  - 15 July – Inigo Jones, architect (died 1652)
  - 7 October – William Laud, Archbishop of Canterbury (died 1645)
  - Richard Johnson, romance writer (died 1659)
  - John Kendrick, merchant (died 1624)
- 1574
  - 7 March (bapt.) – John Wilbye, composer (died 1638)
  - June – Richard Barnfield, poet (died 1627)
  - 1 July – Joseph Hall, bishop and satirist (died 1656)
  - 7 August – Robert Dudley, styled Earl of Warwick, explorer and geographer (died 1649)
  - 4 September – Thomas Gataker, clergyman and theologian (died 1654)
- 1575
  - 5 March – William Oughtred, mathematician (died 1660)
  - 14 August – Robert Hayman, poet (died 1629)
  - Edmund Bolton, historian and poet (died 1633)
  - Lionel Cranfield, 1st Earl of Middlesex, successful London merchant (died 1645)
  - William Parker, 4th Baron Monteagle (died 1622)
  - Arbella Stuart, Duchess of Somerset (died 1615)
  - Cyril Tourneur, dramatist (died 1626)
- 1576
  - October – Thomas Weelkes, composer and organist (died 1626)
  - 7 October – John Marston, writer (died 1634)
  - 12 October – Thomas Dudley, Governor of Massachusetts Bay Colony (died 1652)
  - William Ames, Protestant philosopher (died 1633)
  - Possible date – John Carver, first governor of Plymouth Colony (died 1621)
- 1577
  - 8 February – Robert Burton, scholar (died 1640)
  - 9 July – Thomas West, 3rd Baron De La Warr, governor of Virginia (died 1618)
  - 11 August (bapt.) – Barnaby Potter, Bishop of Carlisle (died 1642)
  - 20 November (bapt.) – Samuel Purchas, travel writer (died 1626)
  - Robert Cushman, Plymouth Colony settler (died 1625)
  - William Noy, lawyer and politician (died 1634)
  - Henry Somerset, 1st Marquess of Worcester (died 1646)
- 1578
  - 2 March – George Sandys, traveller (died 1644)
  - 1 April – William Harvey, physician (died 1657)
  - 16 May – Everard Digby, Gunpowder Plot conspirator (hanged 1606)
  - 24 August – John Taylor, "The Water Poet" (died 1653)
  - Thomas Coventry, 1st Baron Coventry, lawyer (died 1640)
  - Francis Manners, 6th Earl of Rutland (died 1632)
  - Ambrose Rookwood, Gunpowder Plot conspirator (hanged 1606)
- 1579
  - 13 July – Arthur Dee, physician and alchemist (died 1651)
  - 20 December (bapt.) – John Fletcher, playwright (died 1625)
  - Jacob Astley, 1st Baron Astley of Reading, royalist commander in the English Civil War (died 1652)

== Deaths ==
- 1571
  - 12 February – Nicholas Throckmorton, diplomat and politician (born 1515)
  - 1 June – John Story, Catholic lawyer, politician and martyr (executed) (born 1504)
  - 23 September – John Jewel, bishop (born 1522)
- 1572
  - January – Robert Pattison, actor (born c. 1535)
  - 10 March – William Paulet, 1st Marquess of Winchester (born c. 1483)
  - 2 June – Thomas Howard, 4th Duke of Norfolk (executed) (born 1536)
  - 24 October – Edward Stanley, 3rd Earl of Derby, politician (born 1508)
  - Christopher Tye, composer and organist (born 1505)
- 1573
  - 12 January – William Howard, 1st Baron Howard of Effingham, Lord High Admiral (born 1510)
  - 14 May (bur.) – Richard Grafton, merchant and printer (born c. 1506/7 or 1511)
  - 29 July – John Caius, physician (born 1510)
  - Late – Reginald Wolfe, printer (year of birth unknown)
- 1574
  - circa 7 November – Robert White, composer (born 1538)
- 1575
  - 17 May – Matthew Parker, Archbishop of Canterbury (born 1504)
  - 14 July – Richard Taverner, Bible translator (born 1505)
- 1576
  - 22 September – Walter Devereux, 1st Earl of Essex (born 1541)
- 1577
  - 12 August – Thomas Smith, scholar and diplomat (born 1513)
  - 7 October – George Gascoigne, poet (born c. 1525)
  - 29 November – Cuthbert Mayne, recusant Catholic priest and martyr, canonised (executed) (born 1543)
- 1578
  - 7 March – Lady Margaret Douglas, Countess of Lennox, member of the royal family, diplomat (born 1515)
  - 29 March – Arthur Champernowne, admiral (born 1524)
  - 20 June – Thomas Doughty, explorer (executed) (year of birth unknown)
  - 27 July – Jane Lumley, translator (born 1537)
  - 4 August – Thomas Stucley, adventurer (born 1525)
  - December – Nicholas Heath, Archbishop of York and Lord Chancellor (born 1501)
- 1579
  - 20 February – Nicholas Bacon, politician (born 1509)
  - 20 May – Isabella Markham, courtier (born 1527)
  - 10 June – William Whittingham, Biblical scholar and religious reformer (born 1524)
  - 21 November – Thomas Gresham, merchant and financier (born 1519)
