= Convention of Nymegen =

1573 treaty between England and Spain

The Convention of Nymegen (alt. spelling Nijmegen or Nymwegen) was a treaty signed between England and Spain in 1573. The treaty pledged that the English government would cease support for raids on Spanish shipping in the West Indies and Caribbean by English privateers such as Drake and Hawkins.

It is not to be confused with the Treaties of Nijmegen, concluded in 1678 and 1679, ending the wars between France and the Dutch Republic, and other states.

== Treasure crisis of 1568 ==
The original source of the dispute was Elizabeth's seizure of gold from Spanish ships in English ports in November 1568. Chased by pirates in the English channel, five small Spanish ships carrying gold and silver worth 400,000 florins (£85,000) sought shelter in the harbors at Plymouth and Southampton. The English government headed by William Cecil gave its permission. The money was bound for the Netherlands as payment for Spanish soldiers. When Queen Elizabeth learned that the gold was a loan of Italian bankers to the Spanish Crown, she decided to seize it, and treat it as a loan from the Italian bankers to England. The bankers reluctantly agreed to her terms and Elizabeth kept the money. Spain responded by seizing English property in the Netherlands and Spain. England reacted by seizing Spanish ships and properties in England. Spain then reacted by imposing an embargo preventing all English imports into the Netherlands for five years. The bitter diplomatic standoff lasted for years. However neither side wanted war.

The subsequent absence of funds later led to a revolt by the unpaid Spanish army which in the Low Countries resulted in the sacking of Antwerp in 1576, known as the Spanish Fury. As part of the Convention of Nymegen, Elizabeth returned this seized gold to Genoese bankers.

The treaty also laid out provisions for resumed diplomatic and commercial relations between Spain and England. Trading had been suspended but had proven far too damaging to both countries to not be reinstated. The treaty was based on the principles that all merchants would be compensated for losses, and that neither side would shelter or protect rebels or privateers. The Duke of Alba would also leave the Netherlands to help reduce tensions.

These provisions were formalised in the Convention of Bristol in August 1574.

The Nymegen treaty was signed by Elizabeth I and representatives of the Spanish commander, the Duke of Alva.

== Motivation ==
Neutrality seemed the best policy for Elizabeth, who favoured a reactive, expedient foreign policy. There seemed little point in supporting the remaining rebels in the provinces (Netherlands) as Spain's military power there grew and France increasingly withdrew from foreign affairs, embroiled in its own civil war.

== Convention of Bristol ==
England and Spain signed the Treaty of Bristol (or "Convention of Bristol") on 21 August. England admitted it owed Spanish claims of £90,000, Versus English claims of £70,000. England paid Spain the difference of £20,000. It temporarily reversed the deterioration in relations that it followed the treasure crisis of 1568, producing a six-year period of relative friendly and stable relations.

== Consequences ==
Trade resumed between England and Spain and relations improved. Elizabeth resisted pressure from her advisors Walsingham and Leicester to openly offer help to William of Orange in the Netherlands. She did not, however, interfere when he recruited Protestant volunteers in England to his cause.
