= Hendrik van den Eynde =

Lier physician

Hendrik van den Eynde (Latin: Henricus Affinus) (fl. 1517) was a Lier physician and a friend of Erasmus of Rotterdam. He was chief physician of Antwerp, and was involved with Erasmus in "dogged negotiations" about the exchange of silver cups for Erasmus' dedication in one of his books.

== Biography ==
Hendrik van den Eynde from Lier was chief physician of Antwerp in 1517.

In May 1499, as Erasmus' stay in Paris was finishing, the Rotterdam humanist wrote a declamation in praise of medicine, which, in a letter to Jan Botzheim, he claims was originally written upon request from a man who had been personal physician (or surgeon) of Charles V, possibly a certain Ghysbertus or Ghysbrecht Hessels, town physician of Saint-Omer, who was also in Paris in 1499. He put it aside until 1518, when Van den Eynde promised him two silver goblets. Erasmus then decided to publish the declamation, titling it Encomium artis medicae and dedicating it to Van den Eynde.

Erasmus wrote a letter to Van den Eynde in Louvain, dated 6 January 1518. Erasmus also wanted to dedicate a translation of the second book of grammar of Theodorus Gaza to him.

He is also referred to in Erasmus' letter to Pieter Gillis.
