= Council of the North =

English administrative body (1484–1641)

The Council of the North

History
- Founded: 1484
- Disbanded: 1641

Meeting place
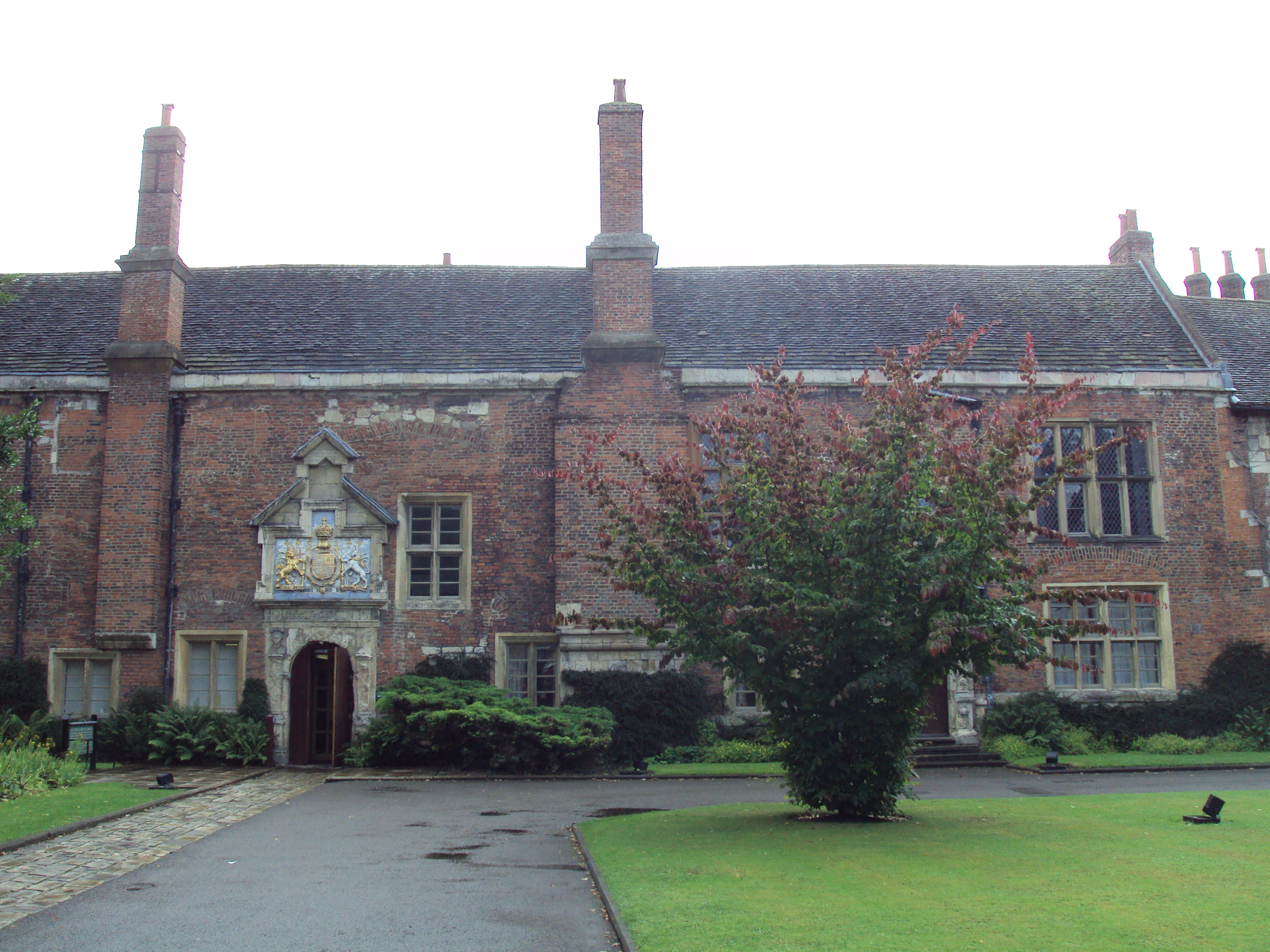
- King's Manor, York, the seat of the Council of the North 1539–1641

The Council of the North was an administrative body first set up in 1484 by King Richard III of England, to improve access to conciliar justice in Northern England. This built upon steps by King Edward IV of England in delegating authority in the north to Richard, Duke of Gloucester, as Richard was known before he became king, and in establishing the Council of Wales and the Marches.

It was based in Yorkshire throughout its history: first at Sheriff Hutton Castle and at Sandal Castle, and then at King's Manor, York. Henry VIII re-established the council after the English Reformation, when the north became identified with Roman Catholicism. It was abolished in 1641, just before the English Civil War.

== History ==
=== First creation ===
The first 'council in the north' was established in 1484 by King Richard III of England. The council was administered from Sheriff Hutton. Richard placed the council in the hands of John de la Pole, 1st Earl of Lincoln, who was charged with control primarily of Yorkshire. A sudden decline in numbers of cases from the far northern counties appearing in the court of king's bench at this time may indicate that in the middle and late 1480s litigants from Northumberland, Cumberland and Westmorland diverted certain legal affairs to this new council.

After Richard's death the council was re-established by Henry VII in 1489, nominally led by the king's young son Arthur Tudor. After Arthur's early death it existed as a sporadically constituted body to deal with pressing issues. The council was led by Thomas Savage, Archbishop of York from shortly after his appointment as Archbishop in 1501 until his death in 1507. During this time he clashed with Henry Percy, 4th Earl of Northumberland, one of the most powerful noblemen in the north of England. Northumberland had wanted several of the positions on the council to go to his supporters but was unable to secure these positions, he had also frequently clashed with two of the Archbishop's household officers Sir John Hotham and Sir Robert Constable. The Archbishop's and the Earl's retinues notably clashed on the road out of Fulford near York in 1504 and the Archbishop's career declined after this point, although he maintained leadership of the council. Following the death of Savage most of the administration of the north was handled by the king's mother Margaret Beaufort via a council based in the Midlands.

=== Re-creation ===
The council was re-established by Henry VIII in 1537, after a period when the north was governed by a less formally constituted council led by Henry Fitzroy. It was established to administer royal justice in the northern parts of England – Nottinghamshire, Derbyshire, Staffordshire, Yorkshire, Lancashire, Durham, Cumberland, Westmorland, and Northumberland.

Resistance to the Reformation was the spur to the recreation of the council. Resentment arose in the north following the English Reformation, the Church of England's split from Rome and the dissolution of the Monasteries. In the north, most people's faith remained staunchly Roman Catholic and many were unhappy with changes. A rebellion rose up in York creating a 30,000 strong Catholic army, carrying crosses and banners depicting the Holy Wounds. This movement became known as the Pilgrimage of Grace.

It was promised that the rebels would be pardoned and a parliament would be held in York to discuss their demands. The rebels, convinced that monasteries would be reopened, returned to their homes. However, after the failed Rebellion by Sir Francis Bigod, Henry had an excuse to arrest rebel leaders and to execute 200 people involved. Suppression followed the Pilgrimage of Grace. The council was reorganised again in 1538 under Robert Holgate as President. It organised four sessions annually, in York, Durham, Newcastle and Hull.

After York Abbey's dissolution, founded by the Lord of Richmond as St Mary's, its abbot's house was retained by the king and allocated it to the council in 1539. The building is now called King's Manor.

=== Abolition ===
In 1620, Thomas Wentworth gave a famous speech to the council in which he emphasised "authority of the king" as the basis for social order: "the keystone which closeth up the arch of government". By 1640, the council was no longer perceived as a centralising royal power agent in the north, but rather as a potential locus of resistance. Edward Hyde advocated the council's abolition. The Long Parliament abolished the council in 1641 for reasons relating to the Reformation: the council was a chief supporter of Catholic Recusants.

== Presidents ==
- Prior to 1530 see Reid's Appendix II.
- Cuthbert Tunstall, Bishop of Durham 1530–1533
- Henry Percy, 6th Earl of Northumberland 1533–1536
- Thomas Howard, 3rd Duke of Norfolk, 1536–1537
- Cuthbert Tunstall, Bishop of Durham 1537–1538
- Robert Holgate, Bishop of Llandaff (later Archbishop of York), 1538–1549
- Francis Talbot, 5th Earl of Shrewsbury, 1549–1560
- Henry Manners, 2nd Earl of Rutland, 1561–1563
- Ambrose Dudley, 3rd Earl of Warwick, 1564
- Thomas Young, Archbishop of York, 1564–1568
- Thomas Radclyffe, 3rd Earl of Sussex, 1568–1572
- Henry Hastings, 3rd Earl of Huntingdon, 1572–1595
- Matthew Hutton, Bishop of Durham & Archbishop of York, 1596–1599
- Thomas Cecil, Lord Burghley 1599–1603
- Edmund Sheffield, 3rd Baron Sheffield 1603–1619
- Emanuel Scrope, 1st Earl of Sunderland 1619–1628
- Thomas Wentworth, Earl of Strafford 1628–1641

== See also ==
- Council of Wales and the Marches
- Council of the West
- Mayoral Council for England
- Holy Jesus Hospital

== Sources ==
- Armstrong, Jackson W. (2020). England's Northern Frontier: Conflict and Local Society in the Fifteenth-Century Scottish Marches. Cambridge: Cambridge University Press. ISBN 9781108472999. OCLC 1249750829.
- Brooks, Frederick William (1954). York and the Council of the North. Borthwick Publications.
- Brooks, Frederick William (1966). The Council of the North (pamphlet no. 25). Historical Association.
- Evans, Antonia, ed. (2002). The York Book. York: Blue Bridge. ISBN 0-9542749-0-3.
- Reid, Rachel R. (1921). The King's Council in the North. London: Longmans, Green and Co.
- Ross, Charles D. (1981). Richard III. English Monarchs series. London: Eyre Methuen. ISBN 978-0-413-29530-9. OCLC 251461788.
