= Treaty of Mechlin (1513) =

1513 alliance against France

The Treaty of Mechlin (1513) was an agreement between Henry VIII, Maximilian I, Holy Roman Emperor, Ferdinand II of Aragon and Pope Leo X to form an alliance against France. The treaty was the first of a series of treaties (the others being the Treaties of London of 1516 and 1518 and the Treaty of Cambrai of 1517) which attempted to unite the main European powers by building a holy league in order to establish a respublica christiana.

Mechlin (or Mechelen) was at the time the seat of Margaret of Austria, Duchess of Savoy and location of her Hof van Savoye.
