= 1550s in England =

Events from the 1550s in England. This decade marks the beginning of the Elizabethan era.

== Incumbents ==
- Monarch – Edward VI (until 6 July 1553), Jane (disputed, 6 July to 19 July 1553), Mary I (starting 19 July 1553, until 17 November 1558) and Philip (starting 25 July 1554, until 17 November 1558), then Elizabeth I
- Regent – John Dudley, 1st Duke of Northumberland (starting 2 February 1550, until 19 July 1553)

== Events ==
- 1550
  - 1 February – Parliament's Putting away of Books and Images Act 1549 receives royal assent, encouraging iconoclasm.
  - c. March – First Edwardine Ordinal published.
  - 24 March – England and France sign the Treaty of Boulogne; England withdraws from Boulogne in France and returns territorial gains in Scotland.
  - 29 March – Sherborne School in Dorset is refounded by King Edward VI.
  - c. May – Vestments controversy begins: Protestant reformer John Hooper declines appointment as Bishop of Gloucester because he objects to the vestments and oath prescribed in the new Ordinal. He is imprisoned for a time.
  - 24 July – French Protestant Church of London established by royal charter.
  - The value of the angel is raised from eight to ten shillings.
- 1551
  - 14 February – Alice Arden conspires with her lover and others to carry out the murder of her husband, Thomas Arden, Mayor of Faversham. The conspirators will be executed.
  - 8 May - John Hooper submits to consecration as Bishop of Gloucester, ending the vestments controversy.
  - By July – fifth and last outbreak of sweating sickness in England. John Caius of Shrewsbury writes the first full contemporary account of the symptoms of the disease.
  - 11 October – John Dudley, Earl of Warwick, de facto Lord Protector of England, is created Duke of Northumberland.
  - St Thomas' Hospital is re-established on its former site in Southwark by the Corporation of London, taken as the founding date for St Thomas's Hospital Medical School.
  - Silver sixpence and crown first minted.
- 1552
  - January – Act of Uniformity imposes the Second Book of Common Prayer (with effect from March). Parish priests are to give instruction in the catechism every Sunday afternoon.
  - 22 January – execution of the former Lord Protector Edward Seymour, 1st Duke of Somerset for treason.
  - 24 February – the privileges of the Hanseatic League are abolished in England.
  - 15 April – Ale Houses Act 1551 receives royal assent, providing for licensing of taverns for the first time.
  - 24 September – the Debatable Lands on the border of England and Scotland are divided between the two kingdoms by a commission creating the Scots' Dike in an unsuccessful attempt to halt lawlessness here, but giving both countries their modern borders.
  - King Edward VI founds 35 grammar schools, including Shrewsbury; Leeds Grammar School is also established.
- 1553
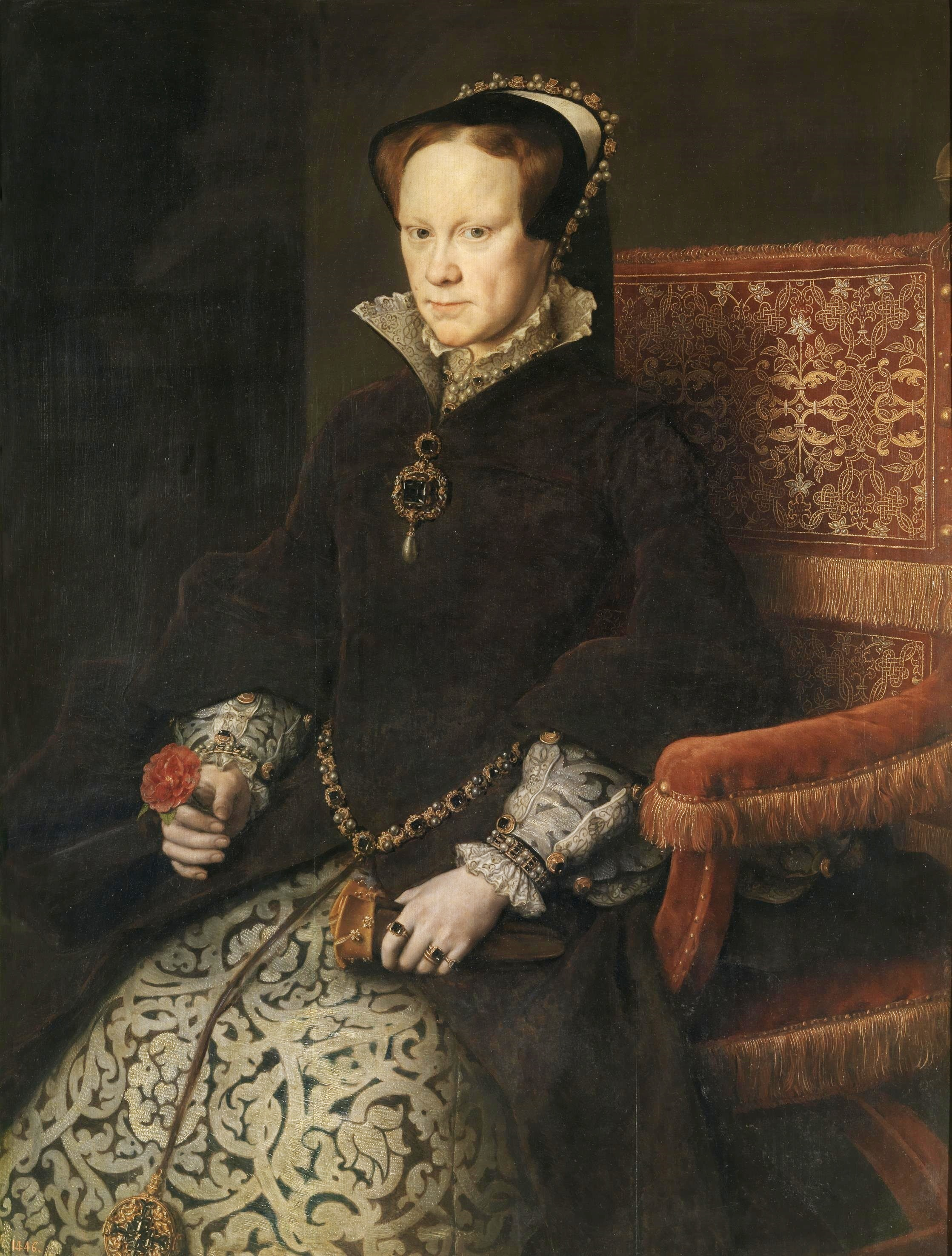
  19 July: Queen Mary
  - 25 May – Lady Jane Grey is married to Lord Guildford Dudley, son of the Duke of Northumberland, in an elaborate ceremony at Durham House, London, in which her two sisters are also married. The bride and groom are both aged around 15 or 16.
  - 16 June – King Edward founds Christ's Hospital for London orphans.
  - 21 June – King Edward, having no male heir or brother, nominates his cousin Lady Jane Grey as his successor (without her knowledge).
  - 6 July – King Edward VI dies aged 15, probably of tuberculosis, at the Palace of Placentia (Greenwich).
  - 7 July – Northumberland secures the Tower of London and other strategic locations against Mary.
  - 9 July – Lady Jane Grey is summoned by Northumberland to Sion House and informed for the first time that she is to be queen. On the same day, Mary writes from Kenninghall requiring the Privy Council to proclaim herself as queen.
  - 10 July – Lady Jane Grey is proclaimed Queen of England by the Privy Council and the proclamation is set into print and sent around the country. She refuses to make her husband king and would be the country's first queen regnant.
  - 12 July – Mary arrives at Framlingham Castle where she gathers armed supporters.
  - c. 13 July – troops headed by Northumberland march from London to resist Mary, reaching Cambridge probably on 15 July.
  - 15 July – the naval fleet intended to blockade Mary's access to the East Anglian coast largely transfers its loyalty to her and she has the use of its ordnance.
  - 19 July – the Privy Council and Thomas White, Lord Mayor of London, proclaim the Catholic Queen Mary as the rightful Queen. Lady Jane Grey is imprisoned within the Tower after using the title of queen for nine days.
  - 30 July – Mary is greeted at Wanstead on the approach to London by her half-sister Elizabeth, who has ridden out from her new London residence, Somerset House.
  - 3 August – Mary rides triumphantly into London to claim the throne, accompanied by Elizabeth.
  - 8 August – funeral of Edward VI at Westminster Abbey.
  - 22 August – the Duke of Northumberland, who has promoted Lady Jane Grey's claim to the throne, is beheaded on Tower Hill.
  - August – Richard Chancellor enters the White Sea and reaches Archangel, going on to the court of Ivan IV of Russia, opening up trade between England and Russia.
  - September – Protestant bishops in England are arrested and Roman Catholic bishops are restored.
  - 1 October – Coronation of Mary I of England at Westminster Abbey.
  - Approximate date – Ralph Roister Doister, the first known comedy in the English language, is written by London schoolmaster Nicholas Udall for his pupils to perform. Gammer Gurton's Needle by "Mr. S." follows.
- 1554
  - 25 January – Wyatt's rebellion: Sir Thomas Wyatt leads a rebellion against Queen Mary's proposed marriage to Prince Philip of Spain.
  - 9 February – Wyatt's rebellion collapses and he surrenders in London.
  - 12 February – after claiming the throne of England the previous year, Lady Jane Grey is beheaded for treason as is her husband – he publicly on Tower Hill and she privately within the Tower of London, where she has remained since the proclamation.
  - 17 March – Princess Elizabeth is imprisoned in the Tower of London, suspected of involvement in Wyatt's rebellion.
  - 21 May – a royal charter is granted to Derby School.
  - 25 July – the wedding of Queen Mary and Prince Philip of Spain, the only son of Charles V, Holy Roman Emperor and her cousin, at Winchester Cathedral under the terms of the Act for the Marriage of Queen Mary to Philip of Spain, which effectively makes them joint monarchs.
  - November – English captain John Lok voyages to Guinea.
  - 30 November – England formally rejoins the Roman Catholic Church.
  - c. December – Revival of the Heresy Acts: Parliament revives laws against heresy.
  - Foundation of Queen Mary's Grammar School, Walsall, and The Free Grammar School of King Philip and Queen Mary, Clitheroe.
- 1555
  - 4 February – John Rogers suffers death by burning at the stake at Smithfield, London, the first of the Protestant martyrs of the English Reformation under Mary I.
  - 8 February – Laurence Saunders is the second of the Marian Protestant martyrs, being led barefoot to his death by burning at the stake in Coventry.
  - 9 February – Rowland Taylor, Rector of Hadleigh, Suffolk, and John Hooper, deposed Bishop of Gloucester, are burned at the stake.
  - 26 February – The Muscovy Company is chartered to trade with the Tsardom of Russia and Richard Chancellor negotiates with the Tsar.
  - 1 May – the foundation of St John's College, Oxford.
  - 30 May – the foundation of Trinity College, Oxford.
  - 12 July – the first four Canterbury Martyrs are burned at the stake.
  - 16 October – two of the Oxford Martyrs, Hugh Latimer and Nicholas Ridley, are burned at the stake.
  - English captain John Lok returns from Guinea with 5 Africans to train as interpreters for future trading voyages.
  - Establishment of the following grammar schools: Boston Grammar School, Gresham's School at Holt, Norfolk (founded by Sir John Gresham) and Ripon Grammar School (re-foundation).
  - Richard Eden translates The Decades of the Newe Worlde or West India, urging his countrymen to follow the lead of Spain in exploring the New World.
- 1556
  - January – Soldier Sir Henry Dudley, from France, plots to raise an invasion force which is planned to land on the Isle of Wight, march on London, remove Queen Mary to exile in Spain and place the Protestant Elizabeth on the throne. By July, the plot is discovered and abandoned.
  - 21 March – the third of the Oxford Martyrs, Thomas Cranmer, deposed Archbishop of Canterbury, is burned at the stake for treason.
  - 22 March – Reginald Pole enthroned as Archbishop of Canterbury.
  - 27 June – thirteen Protestant Stratford Martyrs are burned at the stake in London.
  - 18 July – three Protestant martyrs are burned at the stake in East Grinstead.
  - Establishment of Laxton Grammar School.
  - Period of rapid inflation; prices of many basic commodities double in 12 months.
- 1557
  - 28 February – a commercial treaty is signed with Russia.
  - May – Benedictine monks are allowed to return to Westminster Abbey.
  - 5 June – publication in London of Tottel's Miscellany (Songes and Sonettes), the first printed anthology of English poetry.
  - 7 June – Italian War of 1551–59: England, now allied with Spain, declares war on France.
  - Summer – 1557 influenza pandemic reaches the British Isles.
  - 10 August – Italian War: English and Spanish victory over the French at the Battle of St. Quentin. First record of a Royal Artillery Band.
  - 4 September – Gonville and Caius College, Cambridge, is refounded by surgeon John Caius.
  - The following schools are founded: Brentwood School, Essex, by Sir Antony Browne; Hampton School, Hampton, London, by Robert Hammond; and Repton School, Derbyshire, by Sir John Port.
  - Robert Recorde's The Whetstone of Witte is published, the first English book on algebra, containing the first recorded use of the equals sign and also the first use in English of plus and minus signs.
  - Thomas Tusser's instructional poem A Hundreth Good Pointes of Husbandrie is published.
- 1558
  - 7 January – French troops led by Francis, Duke of Guise take Calais, the last continental possession of England.
  - 13 July – Battle of Gravelines: near the border between France and the Spanish Netherlands, Spanish forces assisted by the English Royal Navy inflict a major defeat on the French.
  - By September – second wave of the 1557 influenza pandemic in England.
  - 15 November – the last five Protestant martyrs of the English Reformation are burnt, at Canterbury.
  - 17 November – Elizabethan era begins: Queen Mary I dies of uterine cancer at St James's Palace aged 42 and the English throne passes to her Protestant half-sister Elizabeth (at this time resident at Hatfield House) as her designated successor, who will rule for 44 years. 12 hours later, Mary's Archbishop of Canterbury, Cardinal Reginald Pole, dies in London.
  - 20 November – William Cecil is appointed principal Secretary of State.
  - Mary's widower Philip II of Spain offers his hand in marriage to Elizabeth provided she adopts the Catholic faith. She takes time before replying and he remarries elsewhere the following year.
  - Elizabeth grants rest and refreshment to pilgrims and travellers who pass by the Holy Well Spring at Malvern, Worcestershire.
  - English explorer Anthony Jenkinson travels from Moscow to Astrakhan and Bukhara.
- 1559
  - 15 January – Elizabeth I of England is crowned in Westminster Abbey by Owen Oglethorpe, Bishop of Carlisle.
  - 23 January – Elizabethan Religious Settlement: The 1st Parliament of Elizabeth I (summoned on 5 December) assembles at Westminster and passes the Act of Supremacy 1558 (requiring any person taking public or church office in England to swear allegiance to the English monarch as Supreme Governor of the Church of England) and the Act of Uniformity 1558 (requiring all persons in England to attend Anglican services on penalty of a fine for noncompliance), re-establishing the Protestant Church of England (royal assent 8 May).
  - 10 February – House of Commons makes a 'Loyal Address', urging Queen Elizabeth to marry.
  - 2 April – the Italian War of 1551–1559 is ended by the Treaty of Cateau-Cambrésis in which France makes peace with England and Spain; among the few gains retained by France is the formerly English town of Calais.
  - 19 December – Matthew Parker enthroned as Archbishop of Canterbury.
  - Reintroduction of the Book of Common Prayer.
  - Benedictine monks are once again expelled from Westminster Abbey.
  - The predecessor of the private banking house of Child & Co. (which will still exist in the 21st century) is established in London.

== Births ==
- 1550
  - April 12 – Edward de Vere, 17th Earl of Oxford, Lord Great Chamberlain (died 1604)
  - October 25 – Ralph Sherwin, Roman Catholic priest and saint (martyred 1581)
  - Approximate date
    - Henry Barrowe, Puritan and Separatist (died 1593)
    - Philip Henslowe, theatrical entrepreneur (died 1616)
    - Judith Ivye, wife of Anthony Prater (died 1578)
    - Edward Somerset, 4th Earl of Worcester (died 1628)
- 1551
  - 2 May – William Camden, historian (died 1623)
  - George Tuchet, 1st Earl of Castlehaven (died 1617)
- 1552
  - 22 January (or 1554?) – Walter Raleigh, soldier, politician, courtier, explorer, historian, poet and spy (executed 1618)
  - 1 February – Edward Coke, colonial entrepreneur and jurist (died 1634)
  - 30 December – Simon Forman, occultist and astrologer (died 1611)
  - Thomas Aufield, Catholic martyr (died 1585)
  - Philemon Holland, translator (died 1637)
  - Edmund Spenser, poet (died 1599)
- 1553
  - John Croke, judge and Speaker of the House of Commons (died 1620)
  - John Florio, writer and translator (died 1625)
  - Richard Hakluyt, author, editor and translator (died 1616)
  - Approximate date
    - Henry Robinson, Bishop of Carlisle (died 1616)
    - William Russell, 1st Baron Russell of Thornhaugh, military leader (died 1613)
    - Jack Ward, pirate (died 1622)
- 1554
  - March – Richard Hooker, Anglican theologian (died 1600)
  - April – Stephen Gosson, satirist (died 1624)
  - 3 October – Fulke Greville, 1st Baron Brooke, poet (died 1628)
  - 30 November – Philip Sidney, courtier and poet (died 1586)
  - James Lancaster, navigator (died 1618)
  - John Lyly, writer (died 1606)
  - John Smyth, Baptist minister (died 1612)
  - Francis Throckmorton, conspirator (died 1584)
- 1555
  - 1 August – Edward Kelley, spirit medium (died 1597)
  - Lancelot Andrewes, clergyman and scholar (died 1626)
  - 17 July – Richard Carew, Cornish translator and antiquary (died 1620)
  - Henry Garnet, Jesuit (executed 1606)
- 1556
  - February – Henry Briggs, mathematician (died 1630)
  - 6 June – Edward la Zouche, 11th Baron Zouche, politician and diplomat (died 1625)
  - Margaret Clitherow, Catholic martyr (died 1586)
- 1557
  - Julius Caesar, judge and politician (died 1636)
  - Thomas Morley, English composer (died 1602)
- 1558
  - 3 November – Thomas Kyd, author of The Spanish Tragedy (died 1594)
  - Robert Greene, writer (died 1592)
  - Chidiock Tichborne, conspirator and poet (died 1586)
- 1559
  - c. 23 April – William Watson, a Catholic priest and conspirator (executed 1603)
  - George Chapman, dramatist (died 1634)
  - John Overall, bishop and academic (died 1619)
  - John Spenser, president of Corpus Christi College, Oxford (died 1614)

== Deaths ==
- 1550
  - 30 July – Thomas Wriothesley, 1st Earl of Southampton, politician (born 1505)
- 1551
  - 13 July – John Wallop, soldier and diplomat (born 1490)
  - 14 July
    - Henry Brandon, 2nd Duke of Suffolk, heir to the Dukedom of Suffolk of the second creation (sweating sickness) (born 1535)
    - Charles Brandon, 3rd Duke of Suffolk, heir to the Dukedom of Suffolk of the second creation (sweating sickness) (born 1537/8)
- 1552
  - 22 January – Edward Seymour, 1st Duke of Somerset, politician (born 1509)
  - 18 April – John Leland, antiquary and historian (born 1502)
  - 10 June – Alexander Barclay, poet (born 1476)
  - October – Simon Haynes, Vice-Chancellor of the University of Cambridge, ambassador and Dean of Exeter
- 1553
  - 6 July – King Edward VI (born 1537)
  - 22 August – John Dudley, 1st Duke of Northumberland, politician (executed) (born 1504)
  - George Joye, Bible translator (born c. 1495)
- 1554
  - 12 February
    - Lady Jane Grey, claimant to the throne of England (executed) (born 1537)
    - Guilford Dudley, consort of Lady Jane Grey (executed) (born c. 1535)
  - 23 February – Henry Grey, 1st Duke of Suffolk, politician (executed) (born 1517)
  - 11 April – Thomas Wyatt the Younger, rebel (executed) (born 1521)
  - 4 August – Sir James Hales, judge (suicide by drowning) (born c. 1550)
  - 25 August – Thomas Howard, 3rd Duke of Norfolk, politician (born 1473)
  - December – John Taylor, Bishop of Lincoln (born 1503)
  - Sir Hugh Willoughby, explorer (in the Arctic Sea)
- 1555
  - 4 February – John Rogers, clergyman and Bible translator (burned at the stake) (born c. 1500)
  - 8 February – Laurence Saunders, clergyman (burned at the stake) (born 1500s)
  - 9 February
    - John Hooper, deposed bishop (burned at the stake) (born c. 1497)
    - Rowland Taylor, clergyman (burned at the stake) (born 1510)
  - 14 March – John Russell, 1st Earl of Bedford (born 1485)
  - 18 April – Polydore Vergil, historian (born 1470)
  - 25 August – Thomas Howard, 3rd Duke of Norfolk (born 1473)
  - 5 October – Edward Wotton, zoologist (born 1492)
  - 16 October
    - Hugh Latimer, clergyman (burned at the stake) (born c. 1487)
    - Nicholas Ridley, clergyman (burned at the stake) (born c. 1500)
  - 12 November – Stephen Gardiner, bishop and Lord Chancellor (born 1493)
- 1556
  - 21 March – Thomas Cranmer, Archbishop of Canterbury (burned at the stake) (born 1489)
  - 11 August – John Bell, Bishop of Worcester
  - 10 November – Richard Chancellor, Arctic explorer (born c. 1521)
  - 23 December – Nicholas Udall, dramatist (born 1504)
- 1557
  - 28 May – Thomas Stafford aristocrat and rebel (executed) (born c. 1533)
  - 16 July – Anne of Cleves, queen of Henry VIII of England (born 1515)
  - 13 September – John Cheke, classical scholar and statesman (born 1514)
  - 25 October – William Cavendish, courtier (born 1505)
  - 18 December – Joyce Lewis, gentlewoman, Protestant convert and martyr (burned at the stake)
- 1558
  - 31 May – Philip Hoby, politician (born 1505)
  - 17 November
    - Queen Mary I of England (born 1516)
    - Reginald Pole, Cardinal Archbishop of Canterbury (born 1500)
    - (bur.) Hugh Aston, composer (born 1485)
  - 15 December – Thomas Cheney, Lord Warden of the Cinque Ports (born c. 1485)
- 1559
  - 8 March – Thomas Tresham I, a Catholic politician
  - 16 March – Anthony St. Leger, Lord Deputy of Ireland (born 1496)
  - 10 September – Anthony Denny, a confidant of Henry VIII of England (born 1501)
  - 18 November – Cuthbert Tunstall, Prince-Bishop of Durham (born 1474)
  - 20 November – Lady Frances Brandon, claimant to the throne of England (born 1517)
  - 31 December – Owen Oglethorpe, deposed Bishop of Carlisle
  - Approximate date – Leonard Digges, mathematician and surveyor (born c. 1515)
