= Council of the West =

The Council of the West

History
- Founded: 1539
- Disbanded: Last Session 1540

Leadership
- Lord President: John Russell, 1st Earl of Bedford

The Council of the West was a short-lived administrative body established by Henry VIII of England for the government of the western counties of England (Cornwall, Devonshire, Dorset, and Somerset). It was analogous in form to the Council of the North; and also comparable to the Council of Wales and the Marches.

== History ==
The council was established in March 1539, with Lord Russell as its Lord President. Members included Thomas Derby, Sir Piers Edgcumbe, Sir Richard Pollard and John Rowe. However, the fall of Thomas Cromwell, the chief political supporter of government by Councils, and the tranquility of the western counties made it largely superfluous. It last sat in the summer of 1540, although it was never formally abolished. The influential role of Russell in the region, however, continued and he was instrumental in the putting down of the Prayer Book Rebellion in 1549. The historian Joyce Youings has argued that, if Cromwell had not fallen, the council would have become part of a network of such bodies, and that his fall saved the region, and England, from his "passion for a salaried bureaucracy".

== Lord Presidents ==
- John Russell, 1st Earl of Bedford (1539-1540)

== See also ==
- South West England
