= Richard Pace =

English clergyman and diplomat (d. 1536)

Richard Pace (c. 1482 – 28 June 1536) was an English clergyman and diplomat of the Tudor period.

== Life ==
Richard Pace was born in Hampshire and educated at Winchester College under Thomas Langton. He attended the universities of Padua and Oxford. In 1509, he accompanied Cardinal Christopher Bainbridge, Archbishop of York, to Rome, and he remained in the service of the Archbishop until that man's death by poisoning in 1514; he was instrumental in bringing the murderer to justice. In 1515, upon his return to England, he entered the service of Cardinal Wolsey where he was employed in diplomacy and espionage. In 1515, Pace became Wolsey's secretary and in 1516 a secretary of state, although he continued to engage in lengthy correspondence with the Cardinal on his orders. He was also collated Archdeacon of Dorset in 1514, holding the post until 1523.

In 1515, Wolsey sent Pace to urge the Swiss to attack France. He was engaged in a lengthy negotiation with Emperor Maximillian I regarding Henry's support of the Emperor's activities against the French in northern Italy, but upon Wolsey's instructions, used the 100,000 florins deposited on his behalf in Antwerp to pay for Swiss soldiers. Maximillian wanted use of the funds, which he claimed had been promised to him by Henry, to levy troops in Switzerland and parts of the Austrian territories. Pace refused to act without direct orders from Henry, despite Maximillian's cajolery, demands, and frustration. Following the Battle of Marignano, Pace was captured by the French and imprisoned for some time, but released in early spring.

In 1519, Henry VIII sent Pace to return to Germany (Holy Roman Empire) to gain support with the seven Prince-Electors to Henry's candidacy as Holy Roman Emperor in the 1519 Imperial Election. However his meeting with them in June and July 1519 failed to secure support for the English king. Pace later attributed his failure to secure support to his late arrival in Germany.

Pace was made dean of St Paul's in 1519, holding the office until 1536. He was present at the Field of the Cloth of Gold in 1520, and in 1521 he went to Venice with the object of winning the support of the republic for Wolsey, who was anxious at this time to become pope. At the end of 1526 he was recalled to England, having been appointed Dean of Exeter (c. 1522 – 1527) and Dean of Salisbury (1523–1536) in his absence.

In February 1536, it was reported that Pace's "mental imbecillity [sic] for many years past has interfered with the due government of the cathedral" and he died in 1536. During his latter years co-adjutors were appointed to help with his ecclesiastical duties.

== Works ==
His chief literary work was De Fructu Qui ex Doctrina Precipitur (Basel, 1517).

He is claimed as the author of Julius exclusus de coelis ("Julius excluded from Heaven"), a satire on Pope Julius II, which was wrongly credited to Erasmus.

== Fictional portrayals ==
In the Showtime television series The Tudors (2007), Pace, played by Matt Ryan, is depicted as being accused of spying, and imprisoned in the Tower of London, wherein he is seen to succumb to madness.

== Sources ==
- Lupton, Joseph Hirst (1895). "Pace, Richard" . In Lee, Sidney (ed.). Dictionary of National Biography. Vol. 43. London: Smith, Elder & Co.

Political offices
Preceded by Thomas Routhall	Secretary of State; 1516–1526	Succeeded by William Knight
