= William Latimer (priest) =

English cleric and scholar of Ancient Greek

William Latimer (c. 1467 – 1545) was an English priest and scholar of Ancient Greek. He had court connections, and was also prominent in the intellectual life of his time.

== Biography ==
Latimer studied at Oxford University, attaining the degree of Bachelor of Arts before being admitted as a fellow of All Souls College, Oxford in 1489. In the 1490s, Latimer traveled to Italy in order to study Greek. He was eventually awarded a Master of Arts by the University of Ferrara in 1502.

Shortly after returning to England in 1502, Latimer took holy orders. Throughout the rest of his life, he combined his travels and studies with a career in the priesthood. He also spent several years serving as a teacher at Canterbury College, Oxford. One of Latimer's most notable students was English cardinal Reginald Pole.

Latimer was one of the foremost scholars of his age, a fact attested by his selection as Pole's tutor and his role as an advisor to Henry VIII on the theological implications of his divorce from Catherine of Aragon. Latimer was also a correspondent of Thomas More and Desiderius Erasmus, the latter specifically seeking Latimer's help during his translation of the New Testament (something Latimer denied in a letter).

Although the precise date of his death is unknown, Latimer died at some point between April and October 1545 – the dates that his will was successively made and proven.
