= 1500s in England =

Events from the 1500s in the Kingdom of England.

== Incumbents ==
- Monarch – Henry VII (until 21 April 1509), then Henry VIII
- Regent – Margaret Beaufort, Countess of Richmond and Derby (starting 21 April, until 28 June 1509)

== Events ==
- 1500
  - Publication of This is the Boke of Cokery, the first known printed cookbook in English.
- 1501
  - 27 January – Archbishop of Canterbury-elect Thomas Langton dies before his consecration.
  - March – first royal court held at the new Richmond Palace.
  - 26 April – Henry Deane elected to the Archbishopric of Canterbury.
  - 2 October – Catherine of Aragon first sets foot in England, at Plymouth; on 4 November she meets her intended spouse, Arthur, Prince of Wales, for the first time, at Dogmersfield in Hampshire.
  - 14 November – Marriage of Arthur, Prince of Wales to Catherine of Aragon at St Paul's Cathedral in London by the Archbishop of Canterbury, followed by a public bedding.
- 1502
  - 24 January – Treaty of Perpetual Peace between Scotland and England is signed at Richmond Palace.
  - 2 April – Death of Arthur, Prince of Wales of fever, at Ludlow Castle, aged 15. He is buried in Worcester Cathedral.
  - 6 May – James Tyrrell executed for allegedly murdering the Princes in the Tower.
  - 19 June – Treaty between England and the Holy Roman Empire signed at Aachen.
  - 26 December – Edmund de la Pole, 3rd Duke of Suffolk, is proclaimed an outlaw at Ipswich on suspicion of plotting against the King.
  - Bristol merchants return from Newfoundland carrying three native people and cod from the Grand Banks.
  - Macclesfield Grammar School is founded by Sir John Percyvale.
- 1503
  - 24 January – construction of the Henry VII Chapel at Westminster Abbey begins.
  - 8 August – marriage of James IV of Scotland and Henry VII's daughter, Margaret Tudor.
  - 19 November – William Warham enthroned as Archbishop of Canterbury.
- 1504
  - 18 February – Henry Tudor created Prince of Wales.
  - March – restrictions placed on livery and maintenance, i.e. the keeping of a retinue of retainers by noblemen.
  - Silver shilling is the first English coin to be minted bearing a recognisable portrait of the King.
- 1505
  - 1 May – Christ's College, Cambridge is granted a royal charter at the instigation of Lady Margaret Beaufort, the King's mother, refounding it under its present name.
  - 28 June – planned marriage of Henry Tudor and Catherine of Aragon postponed when the dowry fails to arrive from Spain.
- 1506
  - 16 January – Duke Philip IV of Burgundy lands at Melcombe Regis after the fleet carrying him to Castile (where he is to take the crown) runs into a violent storm.
  - 9 February and 20 March – Treaties of Windsor ally England, Burgundy and the Habsburgs against France.
  - 24 April – Edmund de la Pole, 3rd Duke of Suffolk, imprisoned as a rival claimant to the throne.
  - 30 April – Malus Intercursus, a treaty between Henry VII and Philip of Burgundy, is signed at Melcombe Regis.
- 1507
  - Only known prosecution, of George Nevill, Lord Bergavenny, for livery and maintenance, i.e. keeping private retainers.
  - 21 December – Henry VII arranges a marriage between his younger daughter, Mary Tudor, and Habsburg Archduke Charles.
- 1508
  - December – formation of the League of Cambrai between France and the Habsburgs results in the wedding between Mary Tudor and Archduke Charles being called off.
- 1509
  - 22 April – the 17-year-old Henry VIII becomes King of England on the death of his father, Henry VII; he will reign for 38 years. His grandmother Lady Margaret Beaufort serves as regent until her death on 29 June.
  - 11 June – Henry VIII marries Catherine of Aragon, his brother's widow.
  - 19 June – Brasenose College, University of Oxford, is founded by Sir Richard Sutton (lawyer), of Prestbury, Cheshire, and the Bishop of Lincoln, William Smyth.
  - 24 June – coronation of Henry VIII.
  - 29 June – death of Lady Margaret Beaufort initiates foundation of St John's College, Cambridge (charter 1511).
  - November – Court chaplain Thomas Wolsey becomes royal almoner.
  - Formation of the Troop of Gentlemen as a royal escort, origin of the Honourable Corps of Gentlemen at Arms.
  - Desiderius Erasmus writes The Praise of Folly while staying with Thomas More.
  - St Paul's School, London, is founded by John Colet, Dean of St. Paul's Cathedral.
  - Royal Grammar School, Guildford, is founded under the will of Robert Beckingham.
  - Queen Elizabeth's Grammar School, Blackburn, is founded.

== Births ==
- 1500
  - 12 March – Reginald Pole, Cardinal Archbishop of Canterbury (died 1558)
- 1501
  - 16 January – Anthony Denny, confidant of Henry VIII of England (died 1559)
  - 21 March – Anne Brooke, Baroness Cobham, born Anne Braye (died 1558)
  - 18 September – Henry Stafford, nobleman (died 1563)
  - approximate date
    - Anne Boleyn, second queen consort of Henry VIII of England (executed 1536)
    - Nicholas Heath, archbishop of York and Lord Chancellor (died 1578)
- 1502 – approximate date
  - Elizabeth Blount, mistress of King Henry VIII of England (died 1540)
  - Henry Percy, 6th Earl of Northumberland, courtier (died 1537)
- 1503
  - 13 September (?) – John Leland, antiquarian (died 1552)
  - John Frith, Protestant priest and martyr (died 1533)
  - Approximate date – Thomas Wyatt, lyric poet and diplomat (died 1542)
- 1504
  - 6 August – Matthew Parker, Archbishop of Canterbury (died 1574)
  - c. December – Nicholas Udall, playwright and schoolmaster (died 1556)
  - John Dudley, 1st Duke of Northumberland, Tudor nobleman and politician (executed 1553)
- 1505
  - William Cavendish, courtier (died 1557)
  - Philip Hoby, politician (died 1558)
  - Thomas Wriothesley, 1st Earl of Southampton, politician (died 1550)
  - Thomas Tallis, composer (died 1585)
  - Christopher Tye, composer and organist (died 1572)
- 1506
  - Elizabeth Barton, nun (died 1534)
  - Margaret Lee, confidante of Queen Anne Boleyn (died 1543)
  - William Paget, 1st Baron Paget, statesman (died 1563)
- 1507
  - Ralph Sadler, statesman (died 1587)

== Deaths ==
- 1500
  - 29 May – Thomas Rotherham, Archbishop of York and Lord Chancellor (born 1423)
  - 19 June – Edmund Tudor, Duke of Somerset, son of Henry VII (born 1499)
  - 15 September – John Morton, Archbishop of Canterbury (born c. 1420)
  - 1 October – John Alcock, Bishop of Ely (born c. 1430)
- 1501
  - April – John Doget, diplomat (year of birth unknown)
  - 20 September – Thomas Grey, 1st Marquess of Dorset, stepson of Edward IV of England (born c. 1453)
- 1502
  - 2 April – Arthur, Prince of Wales (born 1486)
  - 6 May – James Tyrrell, knight, alleged murderer of the princes in the Tower (executed) (born c. 1450)
- 1503
  - 11 February – Elizabeth of York, queen of Henry VII of England (born 1466)
  - 15 February – Henry Deane, Archbishop of Canterbury (born c. 1440)
  - 16 March – Edward Story, Bishop of Carlisle and Chichester (year of birth unknown)
  - 24 June – Reginald Bray, Chancellor of the Duchy of Lancaster and architect (born 1440)
  - 23 November – Margaret of York, wife of Charles I, Duke of Burgundy (born 1446)
  - Richard Amerike, merchant and patron of John Cabot (born 1445)
- 1504
  - 29 July – Thomas Stanley, 1st Earl of Derby (born 1435)
- 1507
  - 24 August – Cecily of York, princess (born 1469)
- 1508
  - 13 October – Edmund de Ros, 10th Baron de Ros, politician (born 1446)
- 1509
  - 29 April – King Henry VII of England (born 1457)
  - 29 June – Lady Margaret Beaufort, mother of Henry VII (born 1443)
