= Thomas Ruthall =

16th-century Bishop of Durham

- Bishop of Durham
- Church: Roman Catholic
- Diocese: Diocese of Durham
- In office: 1509–1523
- Predecessor: Christopher Bainbridge
- Successor: Thomas Wolsey
- Other posts: Dean of Bocking (1495–?); Chancellor of the University of Cambridge (1503–1504); Dean of Salisbury (1505–1508); Dean of Wimborne (c. 1508–1509); Lord Privy Seal (1516–1523)

Orders
- Ordination: 1490 (deacon)
- Consecration: 1509

Personal details
- Born: Cirencester, Gloucestershire, England
- Died: 4 February 1523 (aged c. 55) Westminster, Middlesex, England
- Buried: St John's Chapel, Westminster Abbey
- Denomination: Catholic
- Residence: Durham Place (at death)
- Education: University of Oxford

Thomas Ruthall (also spelled Ruthal, Rowthel or Rowthall; died 4 February 1523) was an English churchman, administrator and diplomat. He was a leading councillor of King Henry VIII.

== Education and early career ==
He was born at Cirencester. He was educated at the University of Oxford, ordained a deacon on 10 April 1490 at Worcester, and incorporated DD at Cambridge in 1500. Before this date he had entered the service of Henry VII of England. In June 1499, then described as prothonotary, he went on an embassy to Louis XII of France, and on his return occupied the position of king's secretary.

== Church and court career ==
Ruthall had a long series of ecclesiastical preferments. In 1495 he had the rectory of Bocking, Essex (whose priest is called the Dean of Bocking), in 1502 he became a prebendary of Wells, and in 1503 Archdeacon of Gloucester, Dean of Salisbury and chancellor of Cambridge. In 1505 he was made prebendary of Lincoln; Henry VII, who had already made him a privy councillor, appointed him Bishop of Durham in 1509, but Henry died before Ruthall was consecrated. Henry VIII confirmed his appointment, and continued him in the office of secretary. He was part of the skeleton council that accompanied Henry VIII to the Tower of London at the beginning of his reign, following the death of Henry VII. In 1510, with Richard Foxe and Thomas Howard, Earl of Surrey, he negotiated a fragile peace with France.

He went to France with the king in 1513 with a hundred men, but was sent back to England when James IV of Scotland threatened war. He took a part in the preparations for defence, strengthened Norham Castle, and wrote to Thomas Wolsey after the Battle of Flodden (1513). He was present at the marriage of Louis XII and the Princess Mary Tudor in 1514, and in 1516 was made Lord Privy Seal.

In 1518 he was present when Wolsey was made a papal legate, and was one of the commissioners when the Princess Mary was betrothed to the Dauphin, Francis III of Brittany. He was at the Field of the Cloth of Gold in 1520, and was again at Calais with Wolsey in 1521. When Buckingham was examined by the king, Ruthall was present as secretary. A hardworking official, he did a great deal of the interviewing necessary in diplomatic negotiations. Brewer represents him as Wolsey's drudge, and Giustinian speaks of his "singing treble to the cardinal's bass." He died on 4 February 1523 at Durham Place, London, and was buried in St John's Chapel, Westminster Abbey.

== Legacy ==
As a benefactor he repaired the bridge at Newcastle, and built a great chamber at Bishop Auckland. He also increased the endowment of the grammar school at Cirencester which had been established by John Chedworth, in 1460. He was a patron of Erasmus. Thomas More was a colleague in government, and a friend, and dedicated his edition of Lucian to Ruthall.

== Styles and titles ==
- 1490–bef. 1493: The Reverend Thomas Ruthall
- bef. 1493–1495: The Reverend Doctor Thomas Ruthall
- 1495–1504: The Very Reverend Doctor Thomas Ruthall
- 1504–1509: The Very Reverend and Right Honourable Doctor Thomas Ruthall
- 1509–1523: The Right Reverend and Right Honourable Doctor Thomas Ruthall

== See also ==
- Secretary of State (England)
- Diplomats (England)

== Sources ==
- M. Johnson, 2004, Ruthall, Thomas (d. 1523)', Oxford Dictionary of National Biography. Oxford: Oxford University Press.

=== Attribution ===
- This article incorporates text from a publication now in the public domain: "Ruthall, Thomas". Dictionary of National Biography. London: Smith, Elder & Co. 1885–1900.

Academic offices
Preceded by George Fitzhugh	Chancellor of the University of Cambridge; 1503–1504	Succeeded by John Fisher
Catholic Church titles
Preceded by Edward Cheyne	Dean of Salisbury; 1505–1508	Succeeded by William Atwater
Preceded by Hugh Oldham	Dean of Wimborne c. 1508–1509	Succeeded by Henry Hornby
Preceded by Christopher Bainbridge	Bishop of Durham; 1509–1523	Succeeded by Thomas Wolsey
Political offices
Preceded by Dr Owen King	Secretary of State; 1500-1516	Succeeded by Richard Pace
Preceded by Richard Foxe	Lord Privy Seal; 1516–1523	Succeeded by Henry Marney
