= Richard Foxe =

15th- and 16th-century English churchman

The Right Reverend Richard Foxe
- Bishop of Winchester
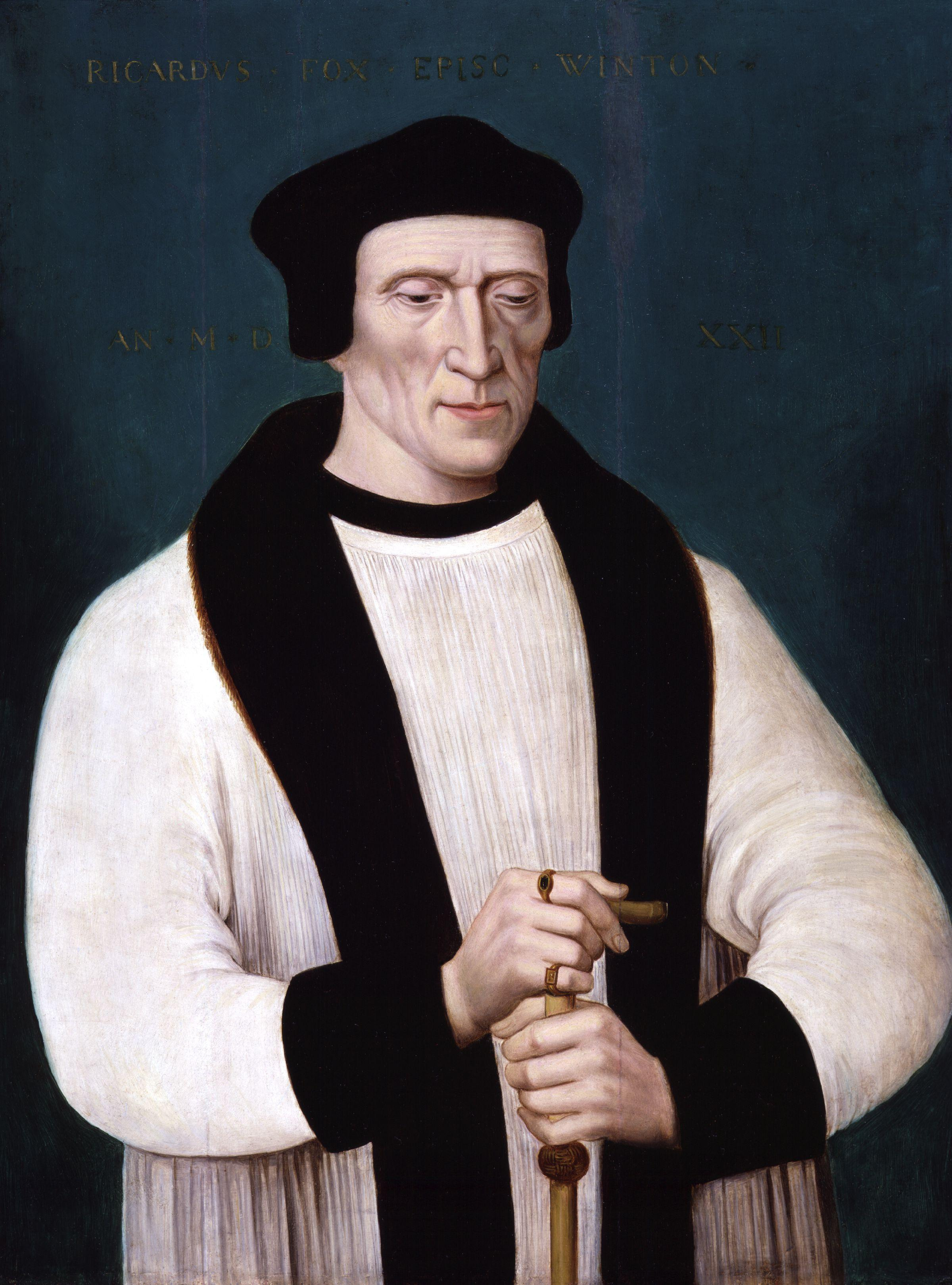
- Church: Roman Catholic
- Appointed: 20 August 1501
- Term ended: 5 October 1528
- Predecessor: Thomas Langton
- Successor: Thomas Wolsey
- Previous posts: Bishop of Exeter; Bishop of Bath and Wells; Bishop of Durham

Orders
- Consecration: 8 April 1487 by John Morton

Personal details
- Born: c. 1448 Ropsley, Lincolnshire, England
- Died: 5 October 1528 (aged 79–80) England
- Denomination: Roman Catholic
- Coat of arms: Richard Foxe's coat of arms

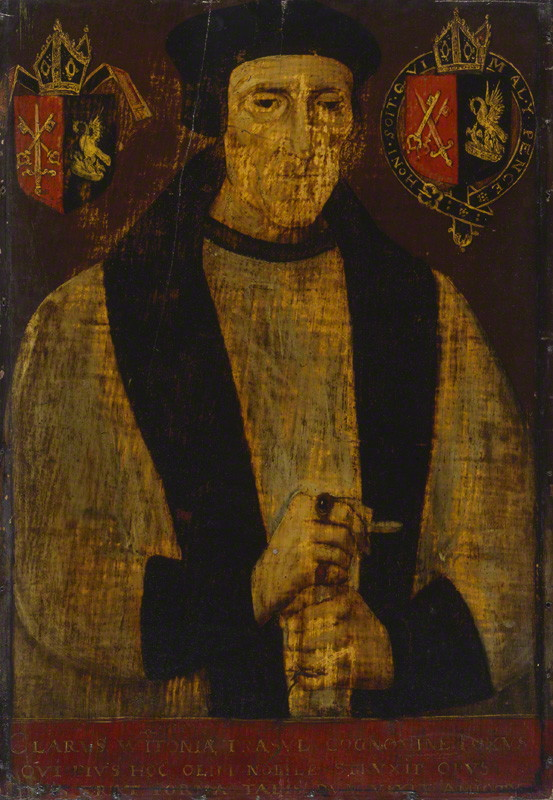
Richard Foxe, portrait after Johannes Corvus, late 16th century, National Portrait Gallery, London. At left are the arms of the See of Exeter impaling Foxe (Azure, a pelican in her piety or) at right are the arms of the See of Winchester impaling Foxe, the whole circumscribed by the Garter.

Arms of Richard Foxe: Azure, a pelican in her piety on her nest proper with pelican often shown or

Richard Foxe (sometimes Richard Fox) (c. 1448 – 5 October 1528) was an English churchman, the founder of Corpus Christi College, Oxford. He was successively Bishop of Exeter, Bath and Wells, Durham, and Winchester, and became also Lord Privy Seal.

== Life ==
Foxe was born at Ropsley near Grantham, Lincolnshire. His parents belonged to the yeoman class, and little is known about Foxe's early career. He is thought to have studied at Magdalen College, Oxford, from which he drew many members of his subsequent foundation, Corpus Christi College, Oxford. Foxe also appears to have studied at Cambridge, but nothing definite is known of his first thirty-five years. He was Master of the school in Stratford-upon-Avon from 1477, "a man of wisdom, knowledge, learning and truth."

In 1484, Foxe was in Paris possibly in pursuit of studies or possibly because he had become unpopular with Richard III. There he came into contact with Henry Tudor, who was beginning his quest for the English throne, and took Foxe into his service. In January 1485 Richard intervened to prevent Foxe's appointment to the vicarage of Stepney on the ground that he was keeping company with the "great rebel, Henry ap Tuddor."

The important offices conferred on Foxe immediately after the Battle of Bosworth imply that he had already seen more extensive political service than can be traced in surviving records. His Tudor credentials immediately confirmed by ordination as Vicar of Stepney. Doubtless Henry had every reason to reward his companions in exile, and to rule like Ferdinand II of Aragon by means of lawyers and churchmen rather than to trust nobles like those who had made the Wars of the Roses. But without an intimate knowledge of Foxe's political experience and capacity he would hardly have made him his principal secretary, and soon afterwards Lord Privy Seal and elected Bishop of Exeter on 29 January 1487, being consecrated on 8 April. The ecclesiastical role provided a salary that was not at Henry's expense; for Foxe never saw either Exeter or the diocese of Bath and Wells to which he was moved in February 1492. His activity was confined to political and especially diplomatic channels; during John Morton's lifetime, Foxe was his subordinate, but after the archbishop's death he was first in Henry's confidence, and had an important share in all the diplomatic work of the reign. In 1487 he negotiated a treaty with King James III of Scotland, also pursuing the possibility of a marriage alliance involving one of Elizabeth of York's sisters. In 1491 he baptised the future King Henry VIII of England. In 1492 he helped conclude the Peace of Etaples, and in 1493 he was chief commissioner in the negotiations for the famous commercial agreement with the Netherlands which Bacon seems to have been the first to call the Magnus Intercursus.

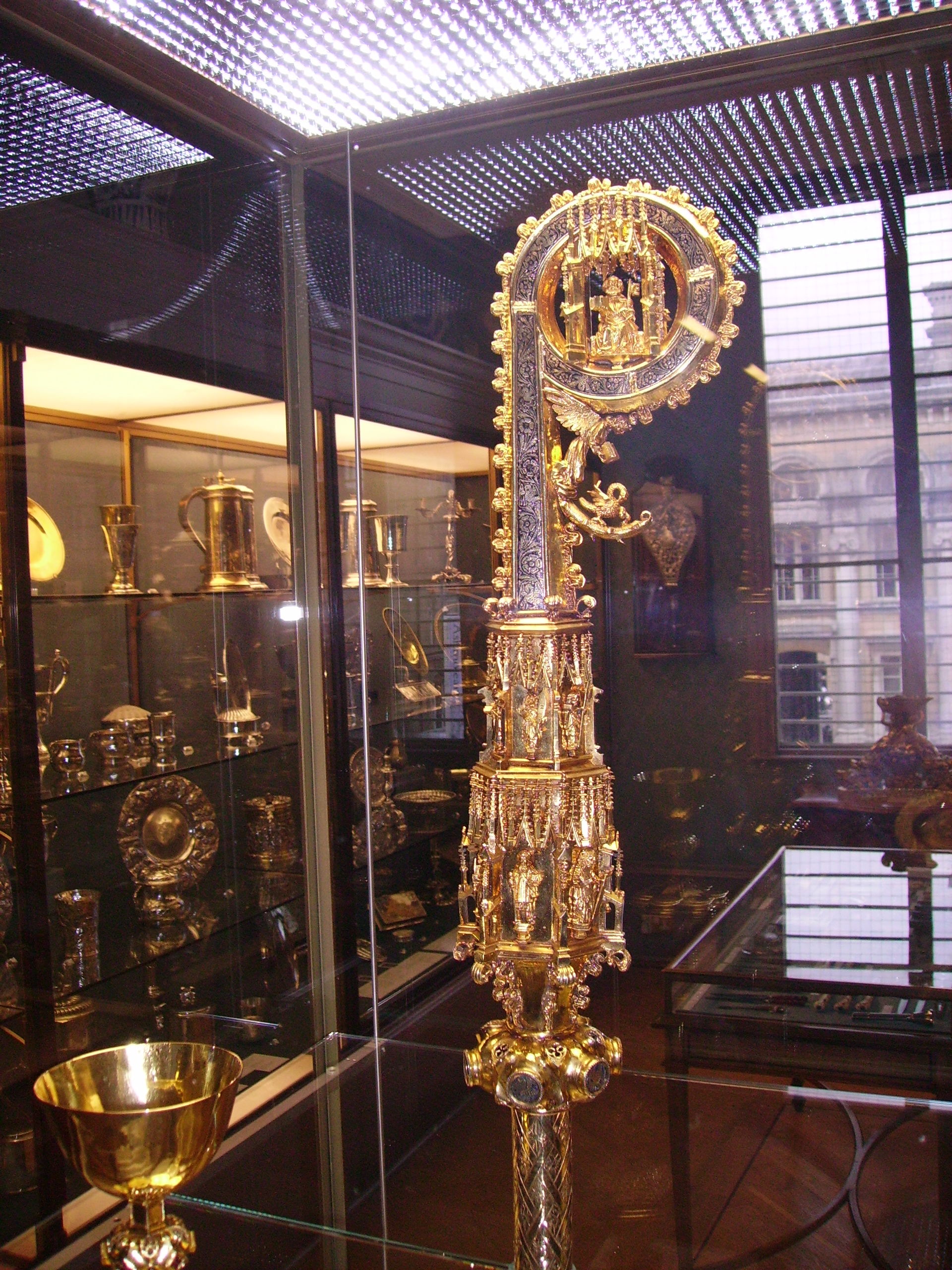
The crosier of Bishop Foxe, now in the Ashmolean Museum, Oxford

Meanwhile, in July 1494 Foxe had been translated to the see of Durham, not merely because it was a richer see than Bath and Wells but because of its political importance as a palatine see and its location adjacent to the Borders and hence its importance for relations with Scotland. For these reasons rather than from any ecclesiastical scruples Foxe visited and resided in his new diocese; and he occupied Norham Castle, which he fortified and defended against a Scottish raid launched in 1497 in support of Perkin Warbeck. But his energies were principally devoted to pacific purposes. In that same year he negotiated Perkin's retirement from the court of James IV, and in 1498–1499 he completed the negotiations for that treaty of marriage between the Scottish king and Henry VII's daughter Margaret which led ultimately to the union of the two crowns in 1603 and of the two kingdoms in 1707. The marriage itself did not take place until 1503, just a century before the accession of James I.

In August 1501 he was translated once more, this time to the see of Winchester, then reputed the richest diocese in England. In that year he brought to a conclusion marriage negotiations not less momentous in their ultimate results, when Prince Arthur was betrothed to Catherine of Aragon. His last diplomatic achievement in the reign of Henry VII was the betrothal of the king's younger daughter Mary to the future emperor Charles V.

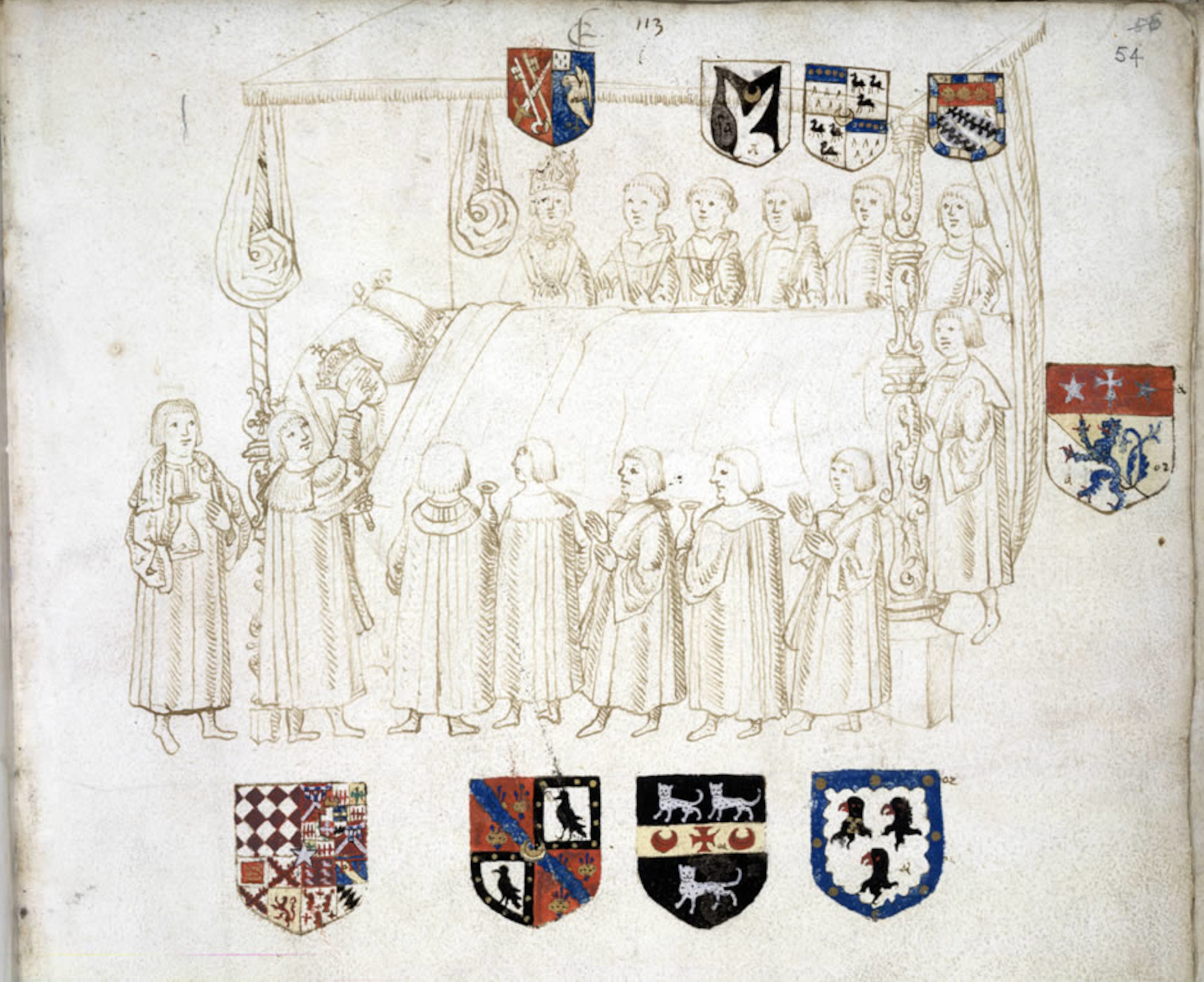
Bishop Foxe at the deathbed of Henry VII at Richmond, 1509. The Bishop stands 1st. at Henry's left-hand, his armourials above. From a contemporary drawing by Sir Thomas Wriothesley. BL Add.MS 45131, f.54

In 1500 Foxe was elected chancellor of Cambridge University and in 1507 master of Pembroke Hall, Cambridge. Lady Margaret Beaufort made him one of her executors, and in this capacity as well as in that of chancellor, he had the chief share with Fisher in regulating the foundation of St John's College, Cambridge, and the Lady Margaret professorships and readerships. His financial work brought him a less enviable notoriety, though history has deprived him of the credit which is his due for "Morton's Fork." The invention of that ingenious dilemma for extorting contributions from poor and rich alike is ascribed as a tradition to Morton by Francis Bacon; but the story is told in greater detail of Foxe by Erasmus, who says he had it from Sir Thomas More. It is in keeping with the somewhat malicious saying about Foxe, reported by William Tyndale, that he would sacrifice his father to save his king.

The accession of Henry VIII only increased Foxe's power, the personnel of his ministry remaining unaltered. The Venetian ambassador called Foxe "alter rex" and the Spanish ambassador Carroz said that Henry trusted him more than any other adviser, although he also reports Henry's warning that the Bishop of Winchester was, as his name implied, "a Foxe indeed." He was the chief of the ecclesiastical statesmen of Morton's school, believed in frequent parliaments, and opposed the spirited foreign policy which laymen like Surrey are supposed to have advocated. His colleagues were William Warham and Ruthal, but Warham and Foxe differed on the question of Henry's marriage, Foxe advising the completion of the match with Catherine of Aragon while Warham expressed doubts as to its canonical validity. They also differed over the prerogatives of Canterbury with regard to probate and other questions of ecclesiastical jurisdiction.

Thomas Wolsey's rapid rise in 1511 put an end to Foxe's influence. The pacific policy of the first two years of Henry VIII's reign was succeeded by a more aggressive foreign policy directed mainly against France; and Foxe complained that no one dared do anything in opposition to Wolsey's wishes. Foxe resigned the privy seal because of Wolsey's ill-advised attempt to drive King Francis I of France out of Milan by financing an expedition led by Maximilian I, Holy Roman Emperor, in 1516. Cuthbert Tunstall protested, Wolsey took Warham's place as chancellor, and Foxe was succeeded by Ruthal, who, said the Venetian ambassador, "sang treble to Wolsey's bass." Yet he warmly congratulated Wolsey two years later when warlike adventures were abandoned at the peace of London. But in 1522, when war was again declared, he emphatically refused to bear any part of the responsibility, and in 1523 he opposed in convocation the financial demands which met with a more strenuous resistance in the House of Commons.

Foxe now devoted himself to his long-neglected episcopal duties. He expressed himself as being as anxious for the reformation of the clergy as Simeon the Righteous for the coming of the Messiah; but was too old to accomplish much himself in the way of remedying the clerical and especially the monastic depravity, licence and corruption he deplored. His sight failed during the last ten years of his life, and Matthew Parker claimed that Wolsey suggested his retirement from his diocese on a pension. Foxe refused, and Wolsey had to wait until Foxe's death before he could add occupation of Winchester to his holding the archdiocese of York and the abbey of St Albans, and thus leave Durham vacant as he hoped for his own illegitimate son. Foxe died on 5 October 1528.

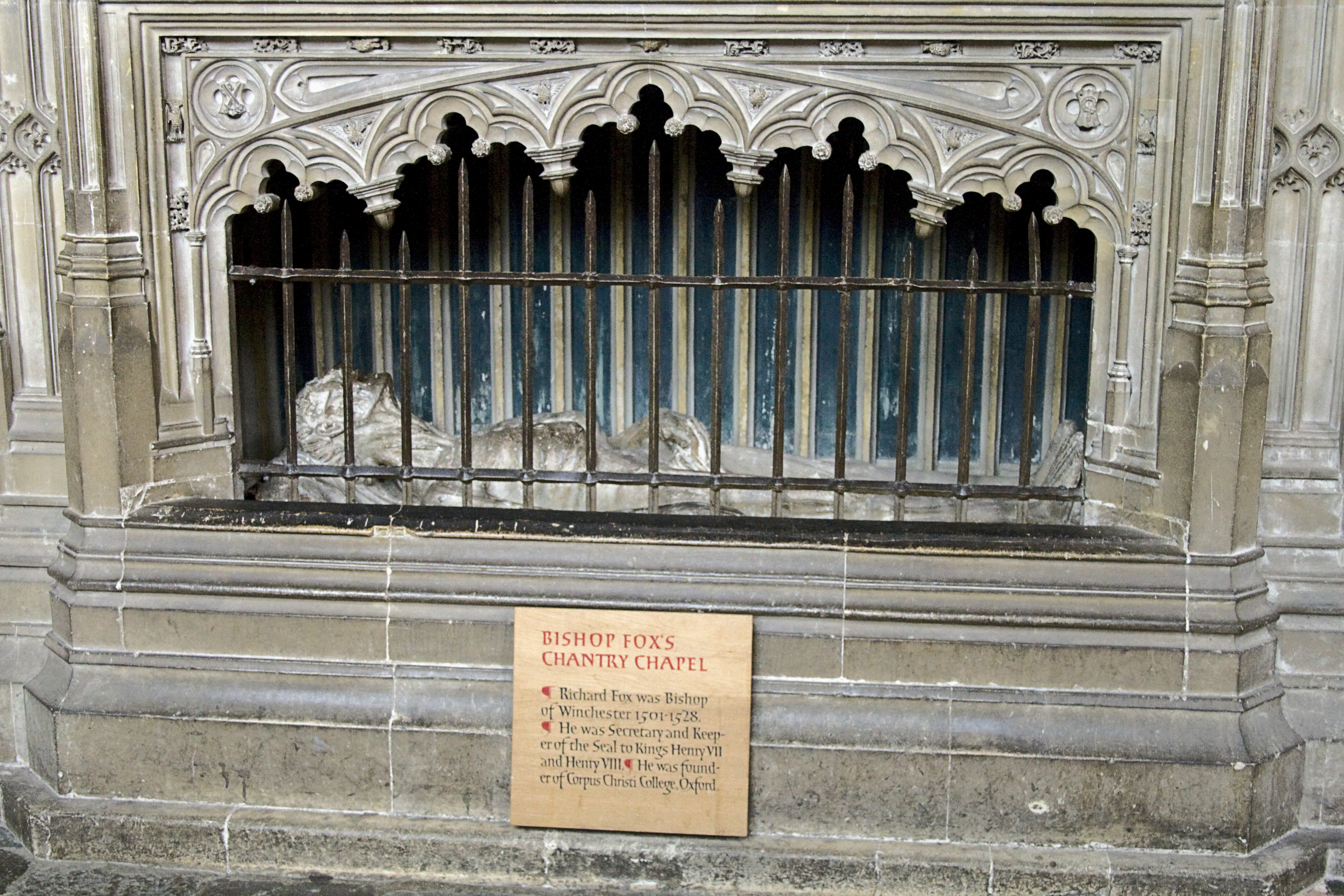
Foxe's tomb in Winchester Cathedral

The crown of Foxe's career was his foundation of Corpus Christi College, Oxford, which he established in 1515–1516, and which was roundly praised by humanist Erasmus. Originally he intended it as an Oxford house for the monks of St Swithin's, Winchester; but he is said to have been dissuaded by Bishop Oldham, who foretold the fall of the monks. The scheme breathed the spirit of the Renaissance; provision was made for the teaching of Greek, Latin and patristic texts. While Erasmus praised the institution, Pole was one of its earliest fellows. The humanist Juan Luís Vives was brought from Italy to teach Latin, and the reader in theology was instructed to follow the Greek and Latin Fathers rather than the scholastic commentaries. Foxe also built and endowed grammar schools at Taunton and Grantham and was a benefactor to numerous other institutions. He died at Wolvesey; Corpus possesses several portraits and other relics of its founder.

== See also ==
- List of Erasmus's correspondents
- List of chancellors of the University of Cambridge

== Citations ==
Political offices
Preceded by John Kendal	Secretary of State; 1485–1487	Succeeded by Oliver Kendal
Preceded by Peter Courtenay	Lord Privy Seal; 1487–1516	Succeeded by Thomas Ruthall
Catholic Church titles
Preceded by Peter Courtenay	Bishop of Exeter; 1487–1492	Succeeded by Oliver King
Preceded by Robert Stillington	Bishop of Bath and Wells; 1492–1494	Succeeded by Oliver King
Preceded by John Sherwood	Bishop of Durham; 1494–1501	Succeeded by William Senhouse
Preceded by Thomas Langton	Bishop of Winchester; 1501–1528	Succeeded by Thomas Wolsey
Academic offices
Preceded by Roger Leyburn	Master of Pembroke College, Cambridge; 1507–1518	Succeeded by Robert Shorton
