= 1790 in Great Britain =

Events from the year 1790 in Great Britain.

== Incumbents ==
- Monarch – George III
- Prime Minister – William Pitt the Younger (Tory)

== Events ==
- 1 January – the Oxford Canal is opened throughout its 91 miles, providing an important link between the River Thames at Oxford and Coventry in the English Midlands.
- 30 January – Henry Greathead's Original rescue life-boat is tested on the River Tyne.
- 14 March – William Bligh arrives back in Britain with the first report of the Mutiny on the Bounty.
- April–May – Josiah Wedgwood shows off his first reproductions of the Portland Vase.
- 5 June – Treason Act 1790 comes into effect, abolishing burning at the stake as the penalty for women convicted of offences of treason (which include coining and mariticide): they are to suffer hanging, bringing the punishment in line with that for men. As a consequence of the change of law, the sentence on Sophia Girton, convicted in April of coining, is delayed and she is in fact transported to the new penal Colony of New South Wales.
- 16 June–28 July – 1790 British general election gives Pitt an increased majority.
- 23 June – alleged London Monster arrested in London: he later receives two years for three assaults.
- 28 June – Forth and Clyde Canal opened.
- 4 July – Third Anglo-Mysore War: in India, Britain allies with the Nizam of Hyderabad against the Kingdom of Mysore.
- 27 July – the Treaty of Reichenbach is signed between Britain, Prussia, Russia and the Dutch Republic allowing Austria to retake the Austrian Netherlands.
- 4 August – Lord North becomes Earl of Guilford upon the death of his father and moves from the House of Commons to the House of Lords.
- undated
  - First organised otter hunt established, at Culmstock, Devon.
  - James Wyatt erects a cast-iron footbridge at Syon Park, Isleworth, the first known British example.

== Publications ==
- 1 November – Edmund Burke's work Reflections on the Revolution in France.
- William Blake's work The Marriage of Heaven and Hell.

== Births ==
- 3 February – Gideon Mantell, paleontologist (d. 1852)
- 3 March – John Austin, legal philosopher (d. 1859)
- 30 May – John Herapath, physicist (d. 1868)
- 19 June – John Gibson, Welsh-born sculptor (d. 1866 in Italy)
- 4 July – George Everest, surveyor and geographer (d. 1866)
- 6 September – John Green Crosse, surgeon (d. 1850)
- 26 September – Nassau W. Senior, economist (d. 1864)
- 25 October – Robert Stirling, Scottish inventor (d. 1878)
- 29 October – David Napier, Scottish-born marine engineer (d. 1869)
- 21 November – Edmund Lyons, 1st Baron Lyons, admiral (d. 1858)
- 8 December – Richard Carlile, radical publisher (d. 1843)
- 19 December – William Edward Parry, Arctic explorer (d. 1855)
- 25 December – Anna Eliza Bray, novelist and travel writer (d. 1883)
- Walter Sholto Douglas, born Mary Diana Dods, Scottish-born writer as David Lyndsay (d. 1830)

== Deaths ==
- 15 January – John Landen, mathematician (born 1719)
- 20 January – John Howard, prison reformer (born 1726)
- 5 February – William Cullen, physician and chemist (born 1710)
- 4 March – Flora MacDonald, Jacobite (born 1722)
- 16 May – Philip Yorke, 2nd Earl of Hardwicke, politician (born 1720)
- 21 May – Thomas Warton, poet (born 1728)
- 17 July – Adam Smith, economist and philosopher (born 1723)
- 4 August – Francis North, 1st Earl of Guilford, peer and politician (born 1704)
- 22 November – Larcum Kendall, watchmaker (born 1719)
- 24 November – Robert Henry, historian (born 1718)
- 14 December – John Hulse, English clergyman (born 1708)

== See also ==
- 1790 in Wales
