= 1933 in the United Kingdom =

Events from the year 1933 in the United Kingdom.

== Incumbents ==
- Monarch – George V
- Prime Minister – Ramsay MacDonald (Coalition)

== Events ==
- January – The London Underground diagram designed by Harry Beck is introduced to the public.
- 9 February – The King and Country debate: The Oxford Union student debating society passes a resolution stating, "That this House will in no circumstances fight for its King and country."
- 28 February – English cricket team in Australia in 1932–33: Tour concludes with the England cricket team winning The Ashes using the controversial bodyline tactic.
- 25 March – First car race at Donington Park circuit in Leicestershire.
- 28 March – 1933 Imperial Airways Dixmude crash: The Imperial Airways Armstrong Whitworth Argosy biplane airliner City of Liverpool catches fire in the air over Belgium and crashes, killing the crew of three and all twelve passengers, the deadliest accident in the history of British civil aviation to this date. The fire onboard may have been started deliberately.
- 2 April – As a member of the English cricket team touring New Zealand, 1933, batsman Wally Hammond scores a record 336 runs in a test match at Eden Park, Auckland.
- 3 April – The Marquess of Douglas and Clydesdale leads an expedition to be the first to fly an aircraft over Mount Everest.
- 13 April – Children and Young Persons Act 1933 passed. This raises the age of criminal responsibility from 7 to 8, raises the minimum age for capital punishment to 18, places restrictions on the identification in the press of persons under 18 appearing in court, sets a minimum full-time working age of 14 with other limitations on the employment of school-age children, and makes it illegal for adults to sell cigarettes or other tobacco products to children under 16.
- 27 April – The Jessop & Son department store in Nottingham is acquired by the John Lewis Partnership, its first store outside London.
- 30 April – First air service internal to Scotland, Renfrew–Campbeltown, operated by Midland & Scottish Air Ferries Ltd. Winifred Drinkwater, "the world's first female commercial pilot", is hired to fly the route.
- 2 May – First modern "sighting" of the Loch Ness Monster.
- 3 May
  - Prime Minister Ramsay MacDonald arrives back in the UK following talks with U.S. President Roosevelt on the global economic situation.
  - In the Irish Free State, Dáil Éireann abolishes the Oath of Allegiance to the British Crown.
- 1 July – London Passenger Transport Board begins operations, unifying multiple earlier services by road and Underground.
- 3 July – New Chiswick Bridge, Twickenham Bridge and Hampton Court Bridge over the River Thames are officially opened.
- 15 July – Signing of the Four-Power Pact by the UK, France, Germany and Italy.
- 26 July – Battersea Power Station, London, first generates electricity.
- 28 July – Grand jury abolished in English law.
- late July–early October – Albert Einstein is on a visit to Britain, for some time living in a wooden hut near Roughton, Norfolk. Having surrendered his German citizenship because of the Nazi regime, he campaigns at this time for safe homes for other exiled Jewish scientists.
- 12 August – Winston Churchill makes his first public speech warning of the dangers of German rearmament.
- 17 August – Release of the film The Private Life of Henry VIII. Charles Laughton receives an Academy Award for the title rôle (16 March 1934), making this the first British film to win an Oscar.
- September – National Grid completed.
- 6 October – Milk Marketing Board established.
- 13 October – British Interplanetary Society founded in Liverpool.
- 15 October – The Rolls-Royce Merlin aircraft engine is run for the first time (on bench test in Derby).
- 23 October – Birmingham city council's 40,000th council house (on the Weoley Castle estate) is opened by Chancellor of the Exchequer Neville Chamberlain.
- 27 October – George Eyston achieves a world land speed record for a diesel car of 101.98 mph (164.12 km/h) at Brooklands.
- 21 December
  - Newfoundland returns to Crown Colony status following financial collapse.
  - The British Plastics Federation (the oldest in the world) is founded.

=== Undated ===
- Ronald Lockley establishes the first British bird observatory on the Welsh island of Skokholm.
- Norman Angell is given the Nobel Peace Prize, not awarded until 1934.

== Publications ==
- Agatha Christie's Hercule Poirot novel Lord Edgware Dies.
- Robert Hichens' novel The Paradine Case.
- James Hilton's utopian novel Lost Horizon.
- A. G. Macdonell's comic novel England, Their England.
- George Orwell's book Down and Out in Paris and London.
- Dorothy L. Sayers' Lord Peter Wimsey novel Murder Must Advertise.
- Angela Thirkell's novel High Rising.
- H. G. Wells' novel The Shape of Things to Come.
- Dennis Wheatley's first published novel The Forbidden Territory.

== Births ==
- 1 January – Joe Orton, playwright (killed 1967)
- 5 January – Derek Johnson, athlete (died 2004)
- 6 January
  - John Clive, author and actor (died 2012)
  - Ian McColl, Baron McColl of Dulwich, surgeon and academic
- 10 January – Anton Rodgers, actor (died 2007)
- 12 January – Michael Aspel, journalist and television presenter
- 13 January – Janet Kear, ornithologist (died 2004)
- 15 January – Frank Bough, television presenter (died 2020)
- 18 January
  - David Bellamy, botanist, author, broadcaster and environmental campaigner (died 2019)
  - John Boorman, film director
- 24 January – Jane Somerville, cardiologist
- 26 January – Peter Zinovieff, engineer and composer (died 2021)
- 2 February
  - Rodney Gordon, architect (died 2008)
  - Tony Jay, British-American actor (died 2006)
- 6 February – Leslie Crowther, television comedian and game show host (died 1996)
- 7 February
  - John Anderton, footballer (died 2019)
  - Stuart Burrows, operatic tenor (died 2025)
- 8 February – Donald Burgess, track cyclist
- 9 February – John Michell, writer (died 2009)
- 13 February – Caroline Blakiston, actress
- 17 February – Cedric Robinson, Queen's Guide to the Sands (died 2021)
- 18 February
  - Sir Bobby Robson, footballer and football manager (died 2009)
  - Mary Ure, actress (died 1975)
- 22 February
  - Sheila Hancock, actress
  - Katharine, Duchess of Kent (died 2025)
- 27 February – Stan Anderson, English football player, manager (died 2018)
- 9 March – Sir David Weatherall, physician (died 2018)
- 12 March – Ken Hodgkisson, English footballer (died 2018)
- 14 March
  - Sir Michael Caine, actor
  - Sir Gavin Laird, trade unionist (died 2017)
- 17 March – Dame Penelope Lively, novelist
- 21 March – Michael Heseltine, British politician and businessman.
- 23 March – Norman Bailey, opera singer (died 2021)
- 25 March
  - Wee Willie Harris, rock and roll singer/pianist (died 2023)
  - Ray Spencer, footballer (died 2016)
- 1 April – Brianne Murphy, cinematographer (died 2003)
- 4 April – Brian Hewson, track and field athlete (died 2022)
- 6 April
  - Sir Roy Goode, legal academic
  - Dudley Sutton, actor (died 2018)
- 11 April
  - Derek Martin, actor (died 2026)
  - Torquil Norman, businessman and philanthropist (died 2025)
- 14 April – Paddy Hopkirk, Northern Irish rally driver (died 2022)
- 16 April – Joan Bakewell, broadcaster
- 18 April – Michael Bradshaw, actor (died 2001)
- 19 April
  - Dickie Bird, cricketer and umpire (died 2025)
  - Philip Wroughton, insurance executive and Lord Lieutenant of Berkshire (died 2020)
- 21 April – Ian Carr, Scottish jazz trumpeter (died 2009)
- 24 April – Claire Davenport, actress (died 2002)
- 27 April – Peter Imbert, Baron Imbert, Commissioner of Police of the Metropolis (died 2017)
- 2 May – Harry Woolf, Baron Woolf, lawyer, Lord Chief Justice of England and Wales
- 9 May – Jessica Steele, romance novelist (died 2020)
- 10 May – Barbara Taylor Bradford, English–born novelist (died 2024)
- 14 May – Siân Phillips, Welsh actress
- 15 May
  - Peter Broadbent, footballer (died 2013)
  - Shirley Dynevor, Welsh actress (died 2023)
- 17 May – Shelley Rohde, journalist and author (died 2007)
- 22 May – Don Estelle, actor (died 2003)
- 23 May – Joan Collins, actress
- 24 May – Anne Mustoe, teacher, cyclist and travel writer (died 2009)
- 25 May – Biddy Baxter, television producer (died 2025)
- 29 May – Nick Whitehead, Olympic sprinter (died 2002)
- 2 June – David Mudd, politician (died 2020)
- 7 June – Stanley Clarke, businessman (died 2004)
- 8 June – Robert Stevens, lawyer and academic (died 2021)
- 10 June – Colin Grainger, footballer (died 2022)
- 14 June – John McHardy Sinclair, linguist (died 2007)
- 16 June – John Cunliffe, author (died 2018)
- 20 June – Claire Tomalin, journalist and biographer
- 22 June – Tony Booth, poster artist (died 2017)
- 26 June – David Winnick, Labour Party politician (died 2026)
- 1 July – Joe Buick, Scottish footballer (died 2021)
- 6 July – Frank Austin, footballer (died 2004)
- 7 July – Bruce Wells, boxer, actor (died 2009)
- 8 July – Jeff Nuttall, actor, poet and painter (died 2004)
- 9 July – Oliver Sacks, English-born neurologist (died 2015)
- 13 July – David Storey, novelist and playwright (died 2017)
- 15 July – Julian Bream, guitarist and lutenist (died 2020)
- 22 July – Alexander Trotman, businessman (died 2005)
- 29 July – Peter Baldwin, actor (died 2015)
- 2 August – Tom Bell, actor (died 2006)
- 5 August – Nicholas Scott, politician (died 2005)
- 9 August – Albert Quixall, footballer (died 2020)
- 10 August
  - Elizabeth Butler-Sloss, judge
  - Keith Duckworth, automotive engineer (died 2005)
- 11 August – Chris Harris, basketball player (died 2022)
- 15 August
  - Rita Hunter, opera singer (died 2001)
  - Michael Rutter, Lebanese-English psychiatrist and academic (died 2021)
- 18 August – Michael Baxandall, art historian (died 2008)
- 21 August
  - Janet Baker, mezzo-soprano
  - Barry Norman, film critic (died 2017)
- 4 September – George Claydon, actor (died 2001)
- 8 September – Michael Frayn, playwright and novelist
- 11 September – Margaret Booth, judge (died 2021)
- 19 September – David McCallum, actor and musician (died 2023)
- 20 September – Dennis Viollet, English footballer (died 1999)
- 26 September – Nicholas J. Phillips, physicist (died 2009)
- 30 September – Barbara Knox, actress
- 2 October – John Gurdon, developmental biologist, recipient of the Nobel Prize in Physiology or Medicine (died 2025)
- 9 October
  - Peter Mansfield, physicist, recipient of the Nobel Prize in Physiology or Medicine (died 2017)
  - Bill Tidy, cartoonist and illustrator (died 2023)
- 10 October – Daniel Massey, actor (died 1998)
- 11 October – Richard Abel Smith, British army officer (died 2004)
- 13 October – Tom Bingham, judge (died 2010)
- 21 October – Maureen Duffy, English poet, playwright, author and activist (died 2026)
- 24 October – Kray twins, gangsters (died 1995 & 2000)
- 25 October – Peter Dennis, actor (died 2009)
- 3 November – John Barry, film score composer (died 2011)
- 8 November – Peter Arundell, racing driver (died 2009)
- 9 November – Geoff Gunney, English rugby league footballer (died 2018)
- 23 November – John Sanders, organist and composer (died 2003)
- 2 December – Peter Robin Harding, air marshal and pilot (died 2021)
- 3 December – Rosalind Knight, actress (died 2020)
- 14 December – David Maloney, television producer (died 2006)
- 16 December – Jennifer Toye, opera singer (died 2022)
- 29 December – Samuel Brittan, economic journalist (died 2020)

== Deaths ==
- 5 January
  - Arthur Borton, soldier, Victoria Cross recipient (born 1883)
  - J. M. Robertson, politician, writer and journalist (born 1856)
- 7 January – Margaret Macdonald Mackintosh, artist and designer (born 1864)
- 14 January – Sir Robert Jones, 1st Baronet, orthopaedic surgeon (born 1857)
- January – Bowman Malcolm, railway engineer, Belfast and Northern Counties Railway (born 1854)
- 31 January – John Galsworthy, novelist, Nobel Prize laureate (born 1867)
- 2 February – Sir Herbert Cory, politician (born 1857)
- 22 April – Sir Henry Royce, car manufacturer (born 1863)
- 7 June – Sir Morley Fletcher, physiologist and administrator (born 1873)
- 14 June – Sir Ernest William Moir, civil engineer (born 1862)
- 16 July – Sir Tudor Walters, politician (born 1866)
- 25 July – John May, Scottish international footballer (born 1878)
- 31 July – Robert Fleming, financier (born 1845)
- 10 August – Alf Morgans, Welsh-born Prime Minister of Western Australia (born 1850)
- 12 October – John Lister, politician (born 1847)
- 18 October
  - Christine Murrell, medical doctor, first female member of the British Medical Association's Central Council (born 1874)
  - Ivor Herbert, 1st Baron Treowen, soldier and politician (born 1851)
- 24 October – Annie Swynnerton, painter (born 1844)
- 25 October – Lillian Hall-Davis, actress (born 1898)
- 20 November – Augustine Birrell, author and politician (born 1850)
- 30 November – Harry de Windt, explorer (born 1856 in France)
- 19 December – George Jackson Churchward, locomotive engineer, Great Western Railway (railway accident) (born 1857)
- 21 December – Dora Montefiore, suffragist and socialist (born 1851)
- 26 December – Henry Watson Fowler, lexicographer (born 1858)
- 30 December – Dugald Cowan, educationalist and Liberal politician (born 1865)

== See also ==
- List of British films of 1933
