= 1740 in Great Britain =

Events from the year 1740 in Great Britain.

== Incumbents ==
- Monarch – George II
- Prime Minister – Robert Walpole (Whig)

== Events ==
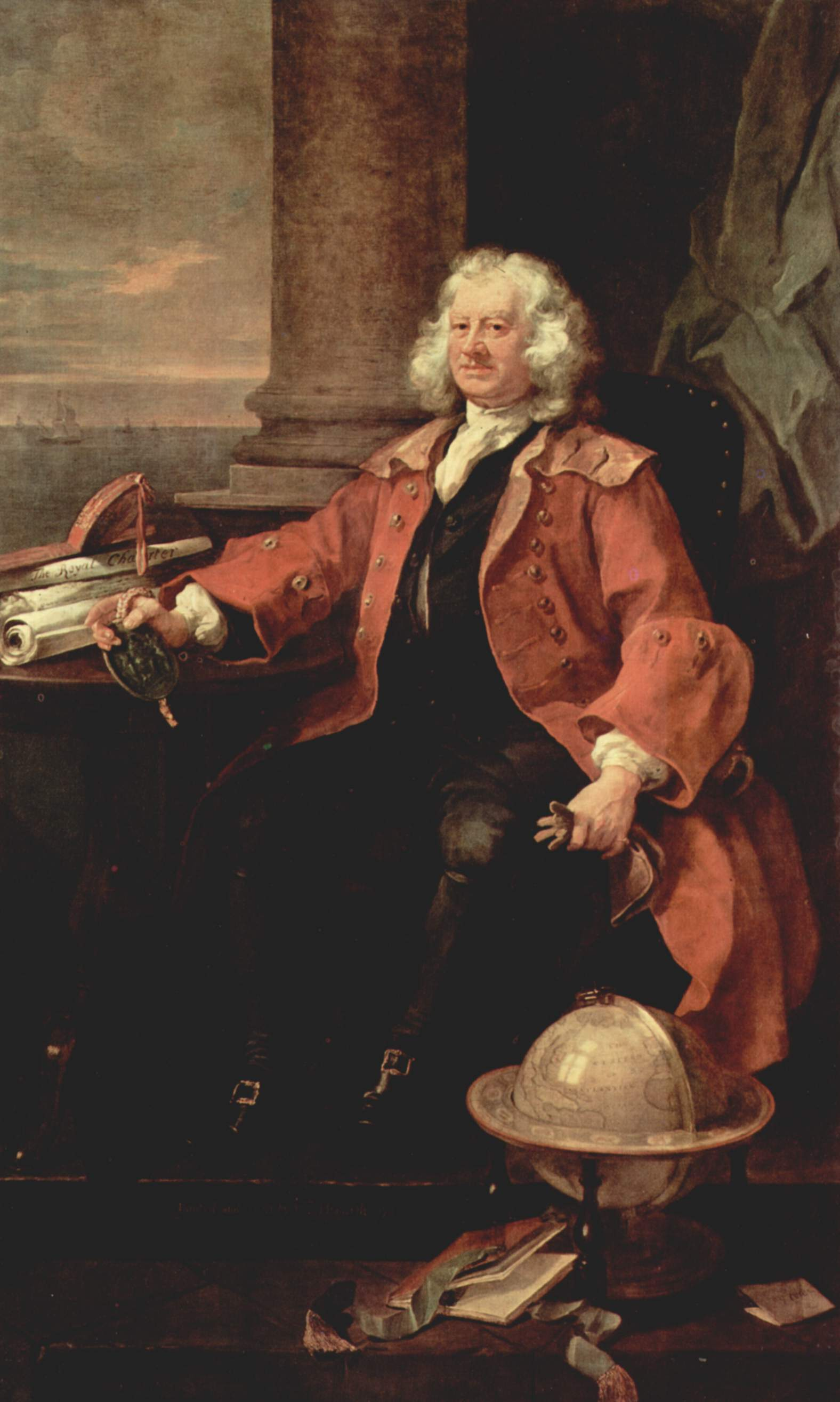
Thomas Coram, painted by William Hogarth, 1740

- January–February – the "Great Frost" continues; this will be the coldest known year (and coldest twelve-month period) by average annual temperature across central England for which reliable records are known.
- 8 January – Dutch East India Company ship Rooswijk is wrecked on the shoals of Goodwin Sands with the loss of all 237 crew as it begins its second voyage to the Indies.
- 8 April – War of the Austrian Succession: Three Royal Navy ships capture the Spanish ship of the line Princesa off Cape Finisterre and takes her into British service as HMS Princess.
- 1 June – Plantation Act 1740 or Naturalization Act 1740 of the Parliament of Great Britain comes into effect providing for Protestant alien immigrants (including Huguenots, and also Jews) residing in the American colonies for 7 years to receive British nationality.
- 26 June – War of Jenkins' Ear: Siege of Fort Mose – A Spanish column of 300 regular troops, free black militia and Indian auxiliaries storms Britain's strategically crucial position of Fort Mose, Florida.
- 1 August – "Rule, Britannia!" is first performed in an open-air performance at Cliveden, the country home of Frederick, Prince of Wales as part of the masque Alfred with music by Thomas Arne to a lyric by Scottish-born poet James Thomson; the original tenor soloist is probably Thomas Salway.
- 8 September – Hertford College, Oxford, is founded for the first time.
- 21 August – First issue of grog in the Royal Navy.
- 18 September – George Anson sets out on his voyage around the world from Spithead.
- 6 November – Samuel Richardson's epistolary novel Pamela; or, Virtue Rewarded is published anonymously in London.

=== Unknown dates ===
- Henry Hindley invents a device to cut the teeth of clock wheels.
- William Hogarth paints a portrait of philanthropist Captain Thomas Coram (pictured).
- A subsequently-discredited account by William Stukeley asserts that Stonehenge was built by druids.
- Thomas Witherby establishes his stationery business in London, specializing in printing and publishing for the marine insurance industry. By the end of the first decade of the 21st century, as the Witherby Publishing Group, it will claim to be the oldest independent publisher in the English speaking world.
- James Whatman establishes his paper mill in Maidstone, specializing in quality paper. It will remain in production until 2014.

== Births ==
- 10 January – Princess Elizabeth of Great Britain, member of the Royal Family (died 1759)
- 27 June – James Woodforde, clergyman and diarist (died 1803)
- 17 September – John Hamilton Mortimer, painter (died 1779)
- 29 October – James Boswell, author (died 1795)
- 24 November – John Bacon, sculptor (died 1799)
- c. December – Francis Light, founder of the British colony of Penang (died 1794)
- date unknown
  - Margaret Bingham, Countess of Lucan, portrait painter and writer (died 1814)
  - Thomas White, cricketer (died 1831)
  - Christopher Wyvill, cleric, landowner and political reformer (died 1822)
  - William Yalden, cricketer (died 1824)

== Deaths ==
- 29 January – Richard Lumley, 2nd Earl of Scarbrough, military officer and politician, suicide (born 1686)
- 19 February – Hester Pinney, businesswoman (born 1658)
- 23 April – Thomas Tickell, writer (born 1685)
- 6 June – Alexander Spotswood, governor of Virginia Colony (born 1676)
- 17 June – Sir William Wyndham, 3rd Baronet, politician (born 1687)
- 20 December – Richard Boyle, 2nd Viscount Shannon, military officer and statesman (born 1675)
- 23 December – Daniel Waterland, English theologian (born 1683)

== See also ==
- 1740 in Wales
