= 1758 in Great Britain =

Events from the year 1758 in the Kingdom of Great Britain.

== Incumbents ==
- Monarch — George II
- Prime Minister — Thomas Pelham-Holles, 1st Duke of Newcastle (Whig)

== Events ==
=== January to April ===
- 15 April – Samuel Johnson begins publishing the series of essays The Idler (1758–1760) in the Universal Chronicle.
- 21 April – Thomas Secker enthroned as Archbishop of Canterbury.
- 24 April – Robert Dodsley and his brother James sign a contract with Edmund Burke to launch The Annual Register.
- 29 April – Seven Years' War: Battle of Cuddalore; a British fleet under George Pocock engages the French fleet of Anne Antoine d'Aché indecisively near Madras.

=== May to August ===
- 23 June – Seven Years' War: Battle of Krefeld; Anglo-Hanoverian forces under Ferdinand of Brunswick defeat the French.
- 8 July – French and Indian War: Battle of Carillon; French forces hold Fort Carillon against British at Ticonderoga, New York.
- 14 July – HMS Victory is ordered for the Royal Navy (RN); she will be a 104-gun, first-rate wooden sailing ship of the line in the United Kingdom (UK).
- 3 August – Seven Years' War: at the Battle of Negapatam off the coast of India, Admiral Pocock again engages d'Aché's French fleet, this time with more success.

=== September to December ===
- 14 September – French and Indian War: at the Battle of Fort Duquesne, a British attack on Fort Duquesne is defeated.
- 27 October – the ship Dublin Trader (Captain White) leaves Parkgate, Cheshire, for Dublin, and founders in the Irish Sea; she carries 70,000 Irish pounds in money, and £80,000 in goods; 2 among the 60 passengers lost are Edward, fifth Earl of Drogheda, Theophilus Cibber, the actor, and (probably) the Irish mezzotint engraver Michael Ford.
- 25 November – French and Indian War: French forces abandon Fort Duquesne to the British, who then name the area Pittsburgh.
- circa December – the first Magdalene institution in Britain, Magdalen Hospital for the Reception of Penitent Prostitutes, is founded in Whitechapel, London, by Robert Dingley, Jonas Hanway, and John Fielding.

== Births ==
- 9 January – George Leveson-Gower, 1st Duke of Sutherland (died 1833)
- 24 January – Frederick Ponsonby, 3rd Earl of Bessborough (died 1844)
- 4 February – George Thicknesse, 19th Baron Audley (died 1818)
- 12 February – David Ochterlony, general (died 1825)
- 17 February – John Pinkerton, antiquarian (died 1826)
- 23 February – Francis Napier, 8th Lord Napier (died 1823)
- 4 April – John Hoppner, English portrait-painter (died 1810)
- 23 April
  - Alexander Hood, Royal Navy officer (killed in action 1798)
  - Alexander Cochrane, Royal Navy officer, admiral (died 1832)
  - Philip Gidley King, Royal Navy officer and colonial administrator (died 1808)
- 30 April – Jane West, writer (died 1852)
- April – Herod, racehorse (died 1780)
- 15 May – Thomas Taylor, neoplatonist translator (died 1835)
- 17 May – Sir John St Aubyn, 5th Baronet, fossil collector (died 1839)
- 30 June – James Stephen, lawyer (died 1832)
- 25 July – Elizabeth Hamilton, writer (died 1816)
- 24 August
  - Edward James Eliot, politician (died 1797)
  - Thomas Picton, soldier and colonial administrator (killed in action 1815)
- 25 August – Israel Pellew, Royal Navy officer (died 1832)
- 1 September – George Spencer, 2nd Earl Spencer, Whig politician (died 1834)
- 9 September – Alexander Nasmyth, portrait and landscape painter (died 1840)
- 29 September – Horatio Nelson, 1st Viscount Nelson, Royal Navy officer, admiral (killed in action 1805)
- 6 October – Watkin Tench, Marine officer (died 1833)
- 28 October – John Sibthorp, botanist (died 1796)
- 5 December – George Beauclerk, 4th Duke of St Albans (died 1787)
- 9 December – Richard Colt Hoare, antiquarian and archaeologist (died 1838)

== Deaths ==
- 7 January – Allan Ramsay, poet (born 1686 in Scotland)
- 17 January – James Hamilton, 6th Duke of Hamilton, peer (born 1724)
- 10 February – Thomas Ripley, architect (born 1683)
- 6 March – Henry Vane, 1st Earl of Darlington, politician (born c. 1705)
- 18 March – Matthew Hutton, Archbishop of Canterbury (born 1693)
- 22 March – Richard Leveridge, bass and composer (born 1670)
- 6 July – George Howe, 3rd Viscount Howe, general (killed in battle) (born c. 1725)
- 18 July – Duncan Campbell, soldier (year of birth unknown)
- 2 August – George Booth, 2nd Earl of Warrington (born 1675)
- 2 October (bur.) – Philip Southcote, landscape gardener (born 1698)
- 12 October – Richard Molesworth, 3rd Viscount Molesworth, field marshal (born 1680)
- 14 October – Francis Edward James Keith, soldier and field marshal (born 1696)
- 20 October – Charles Spencer, 3rd Duke of Marlborough, politician (born 1706)
- c.27/8 October – Theophilus Cibber, actor (born 1703)
- 12 November – John Cockburn, Scottish politician
- 22 November – Richard Edgcumbe, 1st Baron Edgcumbe, politician (born 1680)
- 15 December – John Dyer, poet (born 1699)
- 25 December – James Hervey, clergyman and writer (born 1714)

== See also ==
- 1758 in Wales
