= 1722 in Great Britain =

Events from the year 1722 in Great Britain.

== Incumbents ==
- Monarch – George I
- Prime Minister – Robert Walpole (Whig)

== Events ==
- 27 January – Daniel Defoe's novel Moll Flanders is published anonymously in London.
- 10 February – Battle of Cape Lopez: Off the coast of West Africa, HMS Swallow (captain, Chaloner Ogle) defeats and kills Welsh pirate Bartholomew Roberts.
- 19 March – 1722 British general election begins, the second during the reign of George I.
- 7 May – Construction begins for the Tranent to Cockenzie Waggonway, Scotland's first railway.
- 9 May – General election ends, resulting in a landslide victory for the Whig government of Robert Walpole which increases its majority in the House of Commons to 220.
- 31 July – Property law case of Armory v Delamirie decided in the Court of King's Bench (England), determining that a finder has better title to lost property that they find over everyone except the true owner.
- 9 August – State funeral of John Churchill, 1st Duke of Marlborough, takes place in London, where he is initially buried in the Henry VII Chapel of Westminster Abbey.
- 24 August – Francis Atterbury, Anglican Bishop of Rochester and Dean of Westminster, is arrested in his deanery and confined in the Tower of London for treason, accused of leading the Jacobite "Atterbury Plot" in support of the pretender James Francis Edward Stuart.
- 17 October – Habeas Corpus Suspension Act passed following the discovery of the Atterbury Plot, allowing the Crown to detain suspected conspirators against the State without trial for up to six months.
- 27 November – Jacobite barrister Christopher Layer is sentenced to be hanged, drawn, and quartered for his part in the Atterbury Plot.

=== Undated ===
- Construction begins of Senate House at the University of Cambridge, designed by James Gibbs.
- The "Brown Bess" muzzle-loading smoothbore musket becomes the British Army's standard infantry firearm for land combat for more than a century.
- First known Caslon serif typeface designed by William Caslon in London, the first original typeface of English origin.

== Births ==
- 26 January – Alexander Carlyle, Church of Scotland leader (died 1805)
- 24 February – John Burgoyne, army officer, playwright and politician (died 1792)
- 11 April – Christopher Smart, poet (died 1771)
- 22 April (bapt.) – Joseph Warton, poet and critic (died 1800)
- 16 July – Joseph Wilton, sculptor (died 1803)
- 11 August – Richard Brocklesby, physician (died 1797)
- 16 September – Gabriel Christie, general (died 1799)
- 22 September – John Home, dramatist (died 1808)
- 5 November – William Byron, 5th Baron Byron, dueler (died 1798)
- 30 December – Charles Yorke, Lord Chancellor of Great Britain (died 1770)
- Flora MacDonald, Jacobite (died 1790)

== Deaths ==
- 20 January – Charles Montagu, 1st Duke of Manchester (born c. 1662)
- 21 January – Charles Paulet, 2nd Duke of Bolton, supporter of William III of England (born 1661)
- 10 February – Bartholomew Roberts, pirate (born 1682)
- 5 April – Christopher Bullock, actor and playwright (born 1690)
- 19 April – Charles Spencer, 3rd Earl of Sunderland, statesman (born c. 1674)
- 16 June – John Churchill, 1st Duke of Marlborough, general (born 1650)
- date unknown – John Cecil, 7th Earl of Exeter, peer (born 1700)

== See also ==
- 1722 in Wales
