= 1799 in Great Britain =

Events from the year 1799 in Great Britain.

== Incumbents ==
- Monarch – George III
- Prime Minister – William Pitt the Younger (Tory)
- Foreign Secretary – Lord Grenville

== Events ==
- 9 January – Prime Minister William Pitt the Younger introduces an income tax of two shillings to the pound to raise funds for Great Britain's war effort in the French Revolutionary Wars.
- 20 March–21 May – British troops lend aid to the Ottoman defenders against the French Siege of Acre.
- 4 May – Battle of Seringapatam: British forces defeat the Sultan of Mysore; his kingdom is divided between the Honourable East India Company and Hyderabad.
- 1 July – Britain allies with Russia, Austria, Portugal, Naples, and the Ottoman Empire against France.
- 12 July – Parliament passes:
  - The Combination Act to outlaw trade unions.
  - Unlawful Societies Act to outlaw clandestine radical societies and require a printer's imprint on all published material.
- 15–19 August – A combined French and Spanish fleet stands off the south west coast of England.
- 27 August – Anglo-Russian invasion of Holland: Britain and Russia send an expedition to the Batavian Republic.
- 30 August – Anglo-Russian invasion of Holland: Vlieter Incident – A squadron of the Batavian Republic's navy, commanded by Rear-Admiral Samuel Story, surrenders to the British Royal Navy under Sir Ralph Abercromby and Admiral Sir Charles Mitchell near Wieringen without joining action.
- 6 October – Anglo-Russian invasion of Holland: Battle of Castricum – Franco-Dutch forces defeat the Russo-British expedition force.
- 9 October – Sinking of HMS Lutine (1793), a famous treasure wreck, in the West Frisian Islands.
- 16 October – Action of 16 October 1799: A Spanish treasure convoy worth more than £600,000 is captured by the Royal Navy off Vigo.
- 18 October – Anglo-Russian invasion of Holland: Capitulation of Anglo-Russian expedition forces in North Holland.
- 23 October – The River Severn ferry at The Tuckies, Jackfield, Shropshire capsizes and 28 workers from Coalport China Works are drowned.
- 5 November – HMS Sceptre is wrecked in a storm in Table Bay, South Africa, with the loss of 349 and 41 survivors.
- The Religious Tract Society is established as an evangelical publisher in Paternoster Row, London; as The Lutterworth Press the imprint continues into the 21st century.

=== Ongoing ===
- Anglo-Spanish War, 1796–1808
- French Revolutionary Wars, War of the Second Coalition

== Births ==
- January – James Meadows Rendel, civil engineer (died 1856)
- 12 January – Priscilla Susan Bury, botanist (died 1872)
- 8 February – John Lindley, botanist (died 1865)
- 16 March – Anna Atkins, botanist and photographer (died 1871)
- 29 March – Edward Smith-Stanley, 14th Earl of Derby, Prime Minister (died 1869)
- 17 April – Eliza Acton, cookery writer (died 1859)
- 13 May – Catherine Gore, author (died 1861)
- 21 May – Mary Anning, paleontologist (died 1847)
- 23 May – Thomas Hood, poet (died 1845)
- 18 June – William Lassell, astronomer (died 1880)
- 25 June – David Douglas, Scottish botanist (died 1834 in Hawaii)
- 8 September – James Bowman Lindsay, Scottish inventor (died 1862)
- 21 December – Ignatius Spencer, priest (died 1864)
- James Townsend Saward, barrister and forger (date of death unknown)
- Approximate date – William Simson, Scottish-born painter (died 1847)

== Deaths ==
- 26 January – Gabriel Christie, Scottish-born general and settler in Montreal (born 1722)
- 26 May – James Burnett, Lord Monboddo, Scottish judge and comparative linguist (born 1714)
- 14 June – Sir Patrick Warrender, Scottish soldier and politician (born 1731)
- 4 August – John Bacon, sculptor (born 1740)
- 5 August – Richard Howe, 1st Earl Howe, admiral (born 1726)
- 25 August – John Arnold, watchmaker (born 1736)
- 3 September – William Thomas, academic and Chancellor of Llandaff Cathedral (born 1726)
- 6 October – William Withering, physician (born 1741)
- 4 November – Josiah Tucker, economist (born 1713)
