= 1788 in Great Britain =

Events from the year 1788 in Great Britain.

== Incumbents ==
- Monarch – George III
- Prime Minister – William Pitt the Younger (Tory)

== Events ==
- 1 January – first edition of The Times published under this title (previously The Daily Universal Register).
- 9 January – Association for Promoting the Discovery of the Interior Parts of Africa founded.
- 18 January – Captain Arthur Phillip's ship arrives at Botany Bay.
- 26 January – eleven ships of First Fleet from Botany Bay led by Arthur Phillip land in what would become Sydney, Australia. Britain establishes the prison colony of New South Wales, the first permanent European settlement on the continent.
- 31 January – Henry Benedict Stuart, Cardinal-Bishop of Frascati, becomes the new titular Stuart claimant to the throne of Great Britain as King Henry IX and the figurehead of Jacobitism.
- 13 February – former Governor-General of India Warren Hastings impeached by the House of Lords for misconduct.
- 17 February – the uninhabited Lord Howe Island is discovered by the brig HMS Supply, commanded by Lieutenant Ball, who is on his way from Botany Bay to Norfolk Island with convicts to start a penal settlement there.
- 14 March – the Edinburgh Evening Courant carries a notice of £200 reward for capture of William Brodie, town councillor doubling as a burglar.
- May – the Prime Minister moves for an investigation by the House of Commons into the slave trade to begin; it will be led by Thomas Clarkson and William Wilberforce.
- 20 May – Marylebone Cricket Club publishes revised Laws of Cricket, establishing its position as the final arbiter of the rules of the game.
- 25 June – Margaret Sullivan, a counterfeiter, becomes the penultimate woman in Britain to suffer a sentence of death by burning, in London (although she is in practice strangled before being burnt).
- 13 August – the Triple Alliance is formed between Britain, Prussia and the Dutch Republic.
- 22 August – Britain signs a treaty with the chiefs of Sierra Leone allowing the creation of a settlement for freed slaves.
- 27 August – trial of William Brodie begins in Edinburgh. He is sentenced to death by hanging.
- 1 October – William Brodie hanged at the Tolbooth in Edinburgh.
- 14 October – William Symington demonstrates a paddle steamer on Dalswinton Loch near Dumfries.
- Late October – a period of a mental instability for the King, George III, begins the Regency Crisis of 1788 only averted by his sudden recovery the following February.
- December
  - Robert Burns writes his version of the Scots poem Auld Lang Syne.
  - Gilbert White publishes The Natural History and Antiquities of Selborne, in the County of Southampton (dated 1789).
  - A record dry December with only 8.9 millimetres (0.4 in) England and Wales Precipitation produces the driest calendar year since records began in 1766, with only 612.0 millimetres (24.09 in) of precipitation.^{[a]}
- Undated – annual British iron production reaches 68,000 tons.

== Births ==
- 21 January – William Henry Smyth, astronomer and admiral (died 1865)
- 22 January – Lord Byron, poet (died 1824)
- 5 February – Robert Peel, Prime Minister of the United Kingdom (died 1850)
- 10 March – Edward Hodges Baily, sculptor (died 1867)
- 22 September – Theodore Hook, author (died 1841)

== Deaths ==
- 31 January – Charles Edward Stuart, claimant to the British throne (born 1720)
- 2 February – James Stuart, archaeologist, architect and artist (born 1713)
- 18 February – John Whitehurst, clockmaker and scientist (born 1713)
- 29 March – Charles Wesley, co-founder (with brother, John Wesley) of the religious movement which becomes known as Methodism (born 1707)
- 15 April – Mary Delany, bluestocking, artist and writer (born 1700)
- 14 June – Adam Gib, Scottish Secession Church leader (born 1714)
- 2 August – Thomas Gainsborough, painter (born 1727)
- 26 August – Elizabeth Pierrepont (née Chudleigh), dowager Countess of Bristol, courtier and adventuress (born 1721)
- 15 October – Samuel Greig, admiral in the Imperial Russian Navy (born 1736)
- 6 December – Jonathan Shipley, bishop and politician (born 1714)
- 22 December – Percivall Pott, surgeon (born 1714)

== Notes ==
^{a} Three non-overlapping twelve-month periods have been drier over England and Wales than calendar year 1788 – August 1784 to July 1785, September 1975 to August 1976 and February 1854 to January 1855.

== See also ==
- 1788 in Wales
