= 1726 in Great Britain =

Events from the year 1726 in Great Britain.

== Incumbents ==
- Monarch – George I
- Prime Minister – Robert Walpole (Whig)

== Events ==
- c. April/May – General George Wade begins an 11-year construction program on military roads of Scotland.
- May – Voltaire begins an exile in England which lasts three years.
- 9 May – Catherine Hayes, convicted with two lovers for the brutal murder and dismemberment of her husband in London the previous year, becomes the last woman burned to death at the stake in England, at Tyburn (by this date it is usual for the condemned to be strangled before burning, but the process is botched in this case).
- 25 May – Britain's first circulating library is opened in Edinburgh by poet and bookseller Allan Ramsay.
- 27 June – the Grand Allies, a cartel of coalowning families in the Northumberland and Durham Coalfield, is formed by George and Henry Liddell, George Bowes and Sidney and Edward Wortley.
- 20 October – dedication of St Martin-in-the-Fields church in London as designed by James Gibbs.
- October–December – Mary Toft from Godalming causes a sensation by purporting to give birth to rabbits.
- Undated –
  - Invention of the gridiron pendulum by John Harrison.
  - The remaining ruins of Liverpool Castle are demolished.

== Publications ==
- 28 October – Jonathan Swift's anonymous satirical novel Gulliver's Travels.

== Births ==
- 17 January – Hugh Mercer, soldier and physician (died 1777)
- 8 March – Richard Howe, admiral (died 1799)
- 12 April – Charles Burney, music historian (died 1814)
- 3 June – James Hutton, geologist (died 1797)
- 14 June – Thomas Pennant, naturalist (died 1798)
- 2 September – John Howard, prison reformer (died 1790)
- 26 September – John H. D. Anderson, scientist (died 1796)
- 2 December – Alexander Hood, 1st Viscount Bridport, naval officer (died 1814)

== Deaths ==
- 5 March – Evelyn Pierrepont, 1st Duke of Kingston-upon-Hull, politician (born c. 1655)
- 26 March – John Vanbrugh, architect and dramatist (born 1664)
- 26 April – Jeremy Collier, theatre critic, non-juror bishop and theologian (born 1650)
- 28 April – Thomas Pitt, Governor of Madras (born 1653)
- 9 May – Catherine Hayes, murderer, burned at the stake (born 1690)
- 10 May – Charles Beauclerk, 1st Duke of St Albans, soldier (born 1670)
- 8 July – John Ker, Scottish Presbyterian and informer (born 1673 in Scotland)
- August – Colonel John Stewart, Member of Parliament for the Kirkcudbright Stewartry, killed by Sir Gilbert Eliott, 3rd Baronet, of Stobs
- 5 November – Lady Mary Tudor, heiress (born 1673)
- 23 November – Sophia, Princess of Zelle, queen consort of George I of Great Britain (born 1666)

== See also ==
- 1726 in Wales
