= 1794 in Great Britain =

Events from the year 1794 in Great Britain.

== Incumbents ==
- Monarch – George III
- Prime Minister – William Pitt the Younger (Tory)
- Foreign Secretary – Lord Grenville

== Events ==
- 12 March – rebuilt Theatre Royal, Drury Lane opens in London.
- 23 March – British troops capture Martinique from the French.
- 19 April – Britain signs a treaty of alliance with Prussia and the Netherlands against France.
- 21 April – British troops seize Guadeloupe but the French regain control on 7 June.
- 8 May – Robert Burns' song Scots Wha Hae published in the Morning Chronicle.
- 9 May – Enlistment Act 1794 is passed, allowing Frenchmen (and other foreigners) to join the British Army.
- 14 May – Hambletonian wins his first race. He will win every subsequent race he finishes in his career.
- 1 June – Glorious First of June: A British victory over the French in the first major naval battle of the French Revolutionary Wars. The first official naval medals are awarded (selectively) to senior officers involved.
- 4 June – British troops capture Port-au-Prince in Haiti from the French.
- 17 June
  - The Anglo-Corsican Kingdom is established.
  - Battle of Mykonos: HMS Romney captures French frigate Sibylle.
- 12 July – Horatio Nelson loses his right eye during the Siege of Calvi in Corsica.
- 23 July – Ratcliffe Fire destroys over 400 homes in London.
- 21 August – British troops capture Corsica following the bombardment by Nelson.
- 29 August – the Jesuit school Stonyhurst College, founded in France by Robert Persons relocates to England.
- September – Popgun plot: alleged conspiracy to assassinate King George III with a poisoned dart.
- 28 September – Britain allies with Russia and Austria against France.
- 15 October – Catholic seminarians forced to leave the English College, Douai, settle at Crook Hall, County Durham.
- November – 1794 Treason Trials.
- 19 November – Britain and the United States sign the Jay Treaty (coming into effect 1796), which attempts to clear up some issues left over from the American Revolutionary War and secures a decade of peaceful trade between the two nations.

=== Ongoing ===
- French Revolutionary Wars, First Coalition

=== Undated ===
- Erasmus Darwin's Zoönomia published, anticipating later theories of evolution.
- Thomas Paine's The Age of Reason published.
- Mrs Radcliffe's Gothic novel The Mysteries of Udolpho published.
- Uvedale Price's Essay on the Picturesque, As Compared With The Sublime and The Beautiful published.
- First issue of The Gallery of Fashion which becomes influential in disseminating developments in women's fashion.
- St Mary's College is established at Old Oscott, near Birmingham, the first Roman Catholic seminary in England since the Reformation.
- The music of the Welsh march Men of Harlech is first published (without words) as Gorhoffedd Gwŷr Harlech—March of the Men of Harlech in the second edition of The Musical and Poetical Relicks of the Welsh Bards.

== Births ==
- 17 May – Anna Brownell Jameson, writer (died 1860)
- 24 May – William Whewell, scientist, philosopher, and historian of science (died 1866)
- 14 July – John Gibson Lockhart, writer and editor (died 1854)
- 28 July – Charles Longley, Archbishop of Canterbury (died 1868)
- 30 August – John Rennie the Younger, civil engineer (died 1874)
- Unknown date – William Forster Lloyd, economist (died 1852)
- Approximate date – William Heath, caricaturist (died 1840)

== Deaths ==
- 16 January – Edward Gibbon, historian (born 1737)
- 31 January – Mariot Arbuthnot, admiral (born 1711)
- 18 April – Charles Pratt, 1st Earl Camden, Lord Chancellor of Great Britain (born 1714)
- 27 April – Sir William Jones, philologist (born 1746)
- 18 May – Yemmerrawanne, Aboriginal Australian (born c. 1775)
- 18 June – James Murray, military officer and administrator (born 1721)
- 13 July – James Lind, pioneer of naval hygiene in the Royal Navy (born 1716)
- 17 July – John Roebuck, inventor (born 1718)
- 6 August – Henry Bathurst, 2nd Earl Bathurst, politician (born 1714)
- 21 October – Francis Light, founder of the British colony of Penang (born 1740)

== See also ==
- 1794 in Wales
