= 1798 in Great Britain =

Events from the year 1798 in Great Britain.

== Incumbents ==
- Monarch – George III
- Prime Minister – William Pitt the Younger (Tory)
- Foreign Secretary – Lord Grenville

== Events ==
- 27 May – Pitt–Tierney duel takes place on Putney Heath outside London. The Prime Minister William Pitt fights a duel against the opposition politician George Tierney
- 2 July – the Marine Police Force is formed on the River Thames by magistrate Patrick Colquhoun to prevent pilfering in the Port of London and West India Docks; it is the first organised police force in Britain.
- 1 August – French Revolutionary Wars: Admiral Nelson's fleet destroys the French fleet at the Battle of the Nile.
- 10 September – Battle of St. George's Caye: British settlers win a victory over Spanish settlers in what is to become the colony of British Honduras.
- 18 September – Lyrical Ballads, with a Few Other Poems by William Wordsworth and Samuel Taylor Coleridge is first published anonymously in Bristol, marking the beginning of English literary Romanticism. Most of the poems are by Wordsworth, including Lines composed a few miles above Tintern Abbey on revisiting the banks of the Wye during a tour, 13 July 1798, but also including the first publication of Coleridge's The Rime of the Ancyent Marinere. First London publication is on 4 October.
- 11 October – Elizabeth Inchbald's play Lovers' Vows, adapted from Kotzebue's Das Kind der Liebe, is first performed at London's Theatre Royal, Drury Lane.
- 4 December – British Prime Minister William Pitt the Younger announces the introduction of income tax in 1799.
- 10 December – HMS Colossus (1787), returning from the French Revolutionary Wars, runs aground off Samson, Isles of Scilly. There is only one casualty but antiquities being shipped to England by Sir William Hamilton are lost.

== Undated ==
- Newspaper Publication Act 1798 restricts newspaper circulation.
- Nathan Mayer Rothschild moves from Frankfurt in the Holy Roman Empire to England, settling up in business as a textile trader and financier in Manchester.
- The first recorded excavations at Stonehenge – among the first serious work in archaeology anywhere – are made by William Cunnington and Sir Richard Colt Hoare.

=== Ongoing ===
- Anglo-Spanish War, 1796–1808
- French Revolutionary Wars

== Publications ==
- Samuel Taylor Coleridge and William Wordsworth's Lyrical Ballads.
- Edward Jenner's work on vaccination An Inquiry Into the Causes and Effects of the Variolæ Vaccinæ.
- Thomas Malthus' anonymous work An Essay on the Principle of Population.
- Richmal Mangnall's initially anonymous school textbook Historical and Miscellaneous Questions for the Use of Young People; this will have appeared in 84 editions by 1857.
- Regina Maria Roche's Gothic novel Clermont: a tale.
- Mary Wollstonecraft's posthumous radical feminist novel Maria: or, The Wrongs of Woman.

== Births ==
- March – David Ramsay Hay, interior decorator (died 1866)
- 28 April – Duncan Forbes, linguist (died 1868)
- 12 June – William Abbot, actor (died 1843)
- 28 December – Thomas Henderson, astronomer (died 1844)

== Deaths ==
- 12 May – George Vancouver, explorer (born 1757)
- 19 May – William Byron, 5th Baron Byron, dueller (born 1722)
- 19 June – William Jennens, financier, richest commoner in England (born 1701)
- 25 June – Thomas Sandby, cartographer and architect (born 1721)

== See also ==
- 1798 in Wales
