= Joe Buick =

Scottish footballer (1933–2021)

Personal information
- Full name: Joseph Arnot Lorimer Buick
- Date of birth: 1 July 1933
- Place of birth: Broughty Ferry, Dundee, Scotland
- Date of death: 27 November 2021 (aged 88)
- Place of death: Lincoln, England
- Position: Wing half

Senior career*
Years	Team	Apps	(Gls)
–	Broughty Athletic		
1956–1962	Lincoln City	31	(3)
–	Weymouth		
1962–19??	Cheltenham Town		
–	Ruston Bucyrus		
- * Club domestic league appearances and goals

Joseph Arnot Lorimer Buick (1 July 1933 – 27 November 2021) was a Scottish footballer who made 31 appearances in the Football League playing for Lincoln City. He played as a wing half. He also played for his local team, Broughty Athletic, and in English non-league football for Weymouth, Cheltenham Town, and Ruston Bucyrus. Buick died in Lincoln on 27 November 2021, at the age of 88.
