= 1713 in Great Britain =

Events from the year 1713 in Great Britain.

== Incumbents ==
- Monarch – Anne

== Events ==
- 27 March – First Treaty of Utrecht between Britain and Spain. Spain cedes Gibraltar and Menorca.
- 11 April – Second Treaty of Utrecht signed between Britain and France ending the War of the Spanish Succession. France cedes Newfoundland, Acadia, Hudson Bay and St Kitts.
- 14 April – first performance, in London, of Joseph Addison's libertarian play Cato, a Tragedy.
- 1 May – as part of the Treaty of Utrecht, the Spanish Crown agrees the Asiento de Negros with Queen Anne, granting a subsidiary of the British South Sea Company, the Real Asiento de Inglaterra, a 30-year monopoly in the supply of African slaves to colonial Spanish America.
- 7 July – Handel's "Utrecht Te Deum and Jubilate" is performed at a service in St Paul's Cathedral to commemorate the Peace of Utrecht
- July to August – General election results in a Tory victory.
- Undated – John Rowley of London produces an orrery to a commission by Charles Boyle, 4th Earl of Orrery.

== Publications ==
- Matthew Hale – The History and Analysis of the Common Law of England, the first published history of English law (posthumous).

== Births ==
- 13 January – Charlotte Charke, actress and writer (died 1760)
- 17 March – Sir Charles Asgill, 1st Baronet, politician (died 1788)
- 10 April – John Whitehurst, clockmaker and scientist (died 1788)
- 25 May – John Stuart, 3rd Earl of Bute, Prime Minister (died 1792)
- 11 June – Edward Capell, critic (died 1781)
- 22 June – Lord John Philip Sackville, cricketer (died 1765)
- 7 October – Granville Elliott, military officer (died 1759)
- 13 October – Allan Ramsay, painter (died 1784)
- 24 November – Laurence Sterne, Irish-born English novelist (died 1768)
- 15 December – Welbore Ellis, 1st Baron Mendip, statesman (died 1802)
- December – Jonathan Toup, classical scholar and critic (died 1785)
- Unknown date – James "Athenian" Stuart, archaeologist, architect and artist (died 1788)

== Deaths ==
- 4 February – Anthony Ashley-Cooper, 3rd Earl of Shaftesbury, politician and philosopher (born 1671)
- 20 May – Thomas Sprat, minister (born 1635)
- 7 July – Henry Compton, Bishop of Oxford and privy councillor (born 1632)
- 20 October – Archibald Pitcairne, physician (born 1652)
- October/November – Fabian Stedman, pioneer of change ringing (born 1640)
- 7 November – Elizabeth Barry, actress (born 1658)
- 14 December – Thomas Rymer, historian (born 1641)

== See also ==
- 1713 in Wales
