= 1714 in Great Britain =

Events from the year 1714 in Great Britain. This marks the beginning of the Georgian era.

== Incumbents ==
- Monarch – Anne (until 1 August), George I (starting 1 August)
- Regent – Sir Thomas Parker (starting 1 August, until 18 September)

== Events ==
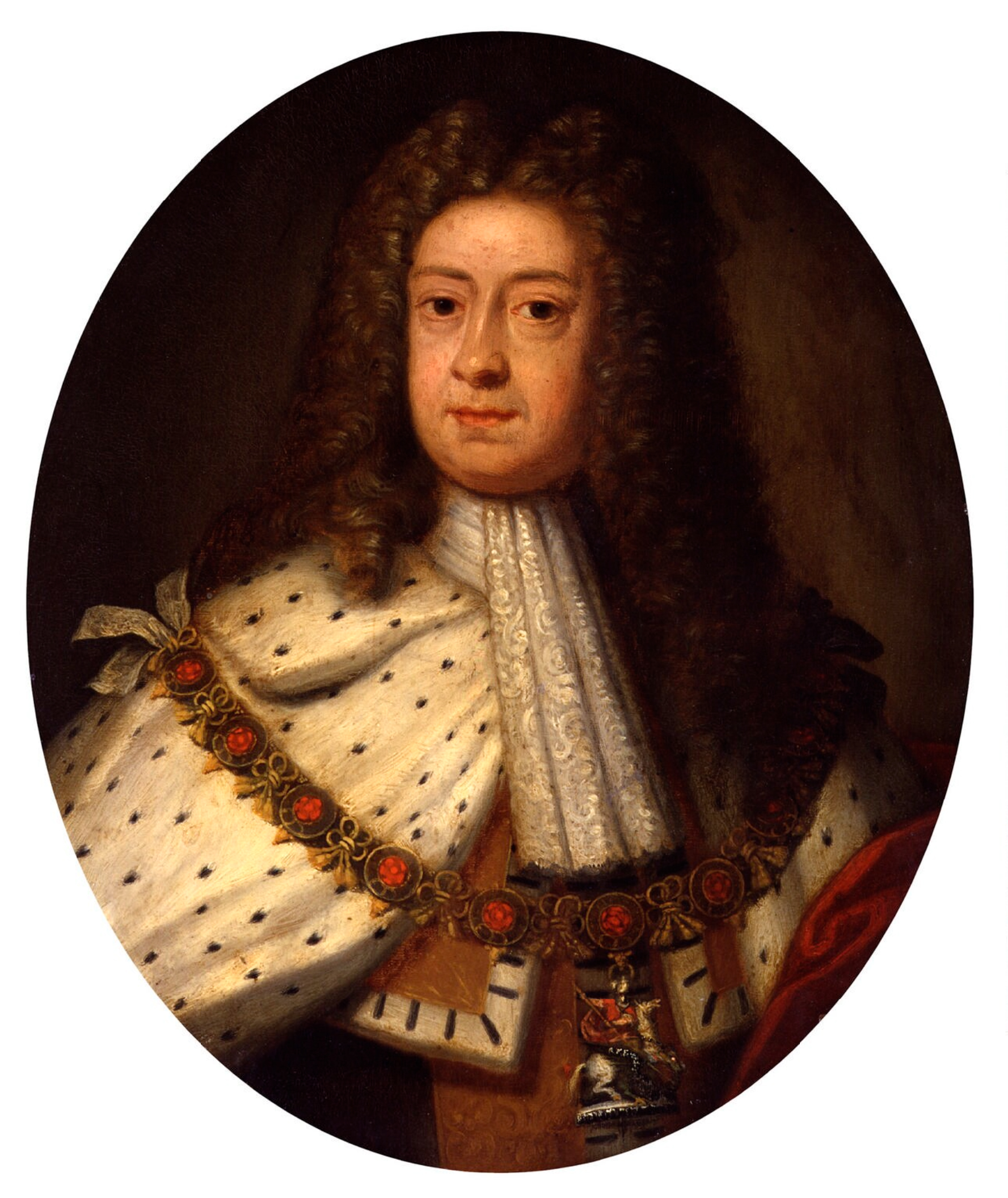
King George c.1714, by Sir Godfrey Kneller

- 2 February – Nicholas Rowe's tragedy Jane Shore premieres at the Drury Lane Theatre in London and is a popular success.
- March – the Scriblerus Club, an informal group of literary friends, is formed by Jonathan Swift, Alexander Pope, John Gay, John Arbuthnot (at whose London house they meet), Thomas Parnell, Henry St. John and Robert Harley.
- 25 March – Archbishop Tenison's School, the world's earliest surviving mixed gender school, is endowed by Thomas Tenison, Archbishop of Canterbury, in Croydon.
- 14 April – Queen Anne performs the last touching for the "King's evil".
- 19 May – Queen Anne refuses to allow members of the House of Hanover to settle in Britain during her lifetime.
- July – first Roman Catholic seminary in Britain opens at Eilean Bàn on Loch Morar in Scotland.
- 8 July – by the Longitude Act, Parliament establishes the Board of Longitude and offers substantial monetary longitude rewards to anyone who can solve the problem of accurately determining a ship's longitude.
- 27 July – Robert Harley, 1st Earl of Oxford and Earl Mortimer, is dismissed as Lord High Treasurer.
- 29 July – Worcester College, Oxford, is founded under the will of Sir Thomas Cookes of Worcestershire on the site of Gloucester College, closed during the Dissolution of the Monasteries.
- 30 July – Charles Talbot, 1st Duke of Shrewsbury, becomes the new Lord High Treasurer.
- 1 August
  - Hanoverian succession: George, elector of Hanover, becomes King George I of Great Britain on the death at Kensington Palace following a stroke of his second cousin, Queen Anne, without surviving issue and the death on 28 May of the designated first heir Electress Sophia of Hanover.
  - Schism Act, intended to restrain dissenting academies; never enforced due to the change of monarchy.
- 18 September – King George arrives in Britain for the first time, landing at Greenwich.
- 20 October – coronation of King George I at Westminster Abbey, giving rise to Coronation riots in over twenty towns in England.

== Births ==
- 6 January – Percivall Pott, surgeon (died 1788)
- 25 February – Hyde Parker, admiral (died 1782)
- 26 February – James Hervey, clergyman and writer (died 1758)
- 7 April – John Elwes, né Meggot, miser and politician (died 1789)
- 14 April – Adam Gib, religious leader (died 1788)
- 3 June – John Conder, Independent English minister at Cambridge (later President of the Independent College) (died 1781)
- 1 August – Richard Wilson, painter (died 1782)
- 3 August – William Cole, antiquary (died 1782)
- 25 October – James Burnett, Lord Monboddo, philosopher and evolutionary thinker (died 1799)
- 13 November – William Shenstone, English poet (died 1763)
- date unknown – Peregrine Bertie, 3rd Duke of Ancaster and Kesteven, politician (died 1778)

== Deaths ==
- 2 February – John Sharp, Archbishop of York (born 1643)
- 24 February – Edmund Andros, governor in North America (born 1637)
- 1 March – Thomas Ellwood, religious writer (born 1639)
- 15 May – Roger Elliott, general and Governor of Gibraltar (born c.1665)
- 8 June – Electress Sophia of Hanover, heir to the throne (born 1630)
- 22 June – Matthew Henry, non-conformist minister (born 1662)
- 1 August – Queen Anne (born 1665)
- 26 August – Edward Fowler, Bishop of Gloucester (born 1632)
- 1 November – John Radcliffe, physician (born 1650)
- Robert Ferguson, Presbyterian minister, plotter and pamphleteer (born c.1637 in Scotland)

== See also ==
- 1714 in Wales
