= 1782 in Great Britain =

Events from the year 1782 in Great Britain. The American Revolutionary War draws to a close.

== Incumbents ==
- Monarch – George III
- Prime Minister – Frederick North, Lord North (Tory) (until 22 March); Charles Watson-Wentworth, 2nd Marquess of Rockingham (Whig) (starting 27 March, until 1 July); William Petty, 2nd Earl of Shelburne (Whig) (starting 4 July)

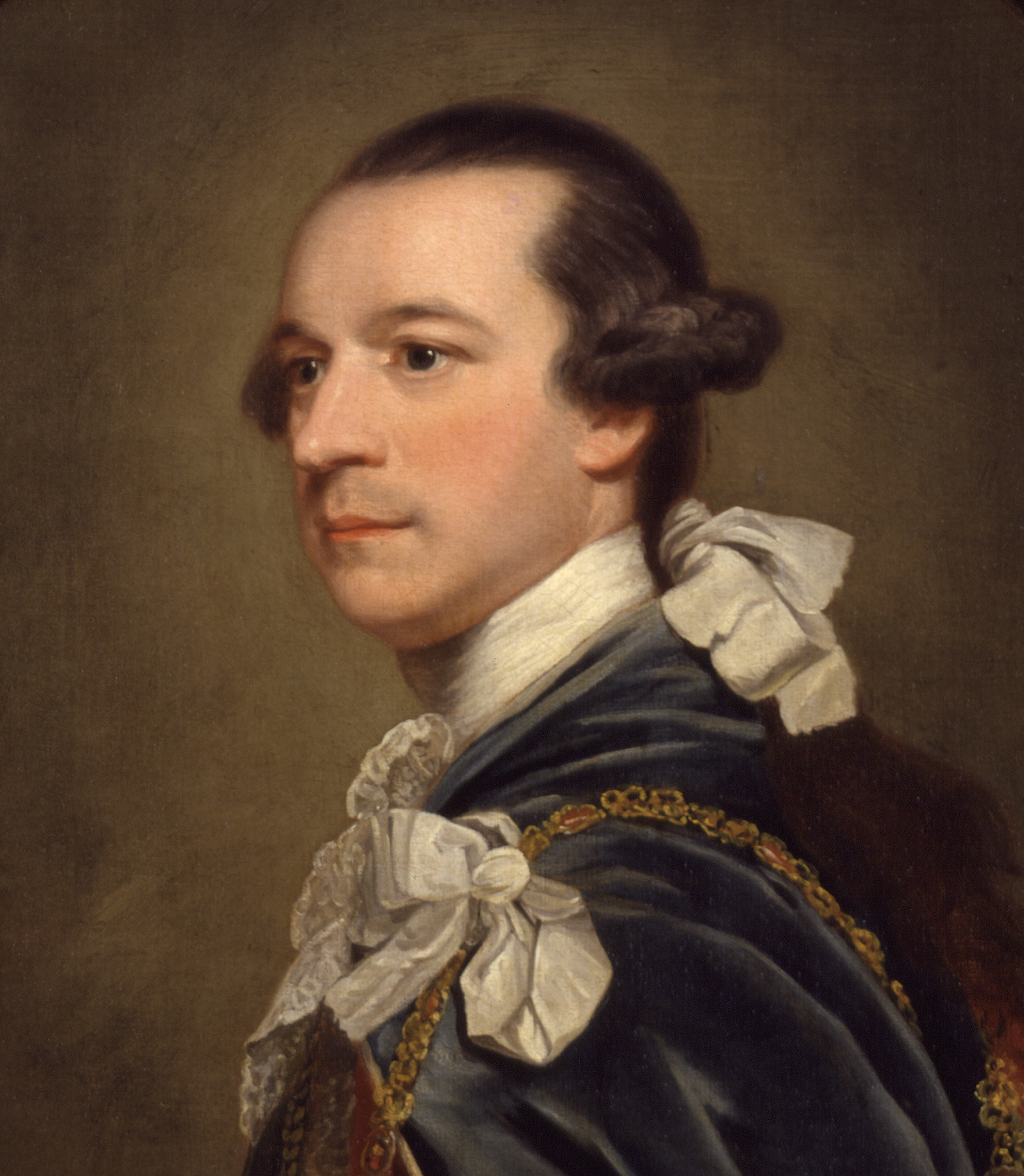
Charles Watson-Wentworth, 2nd Marquess of Rockingham

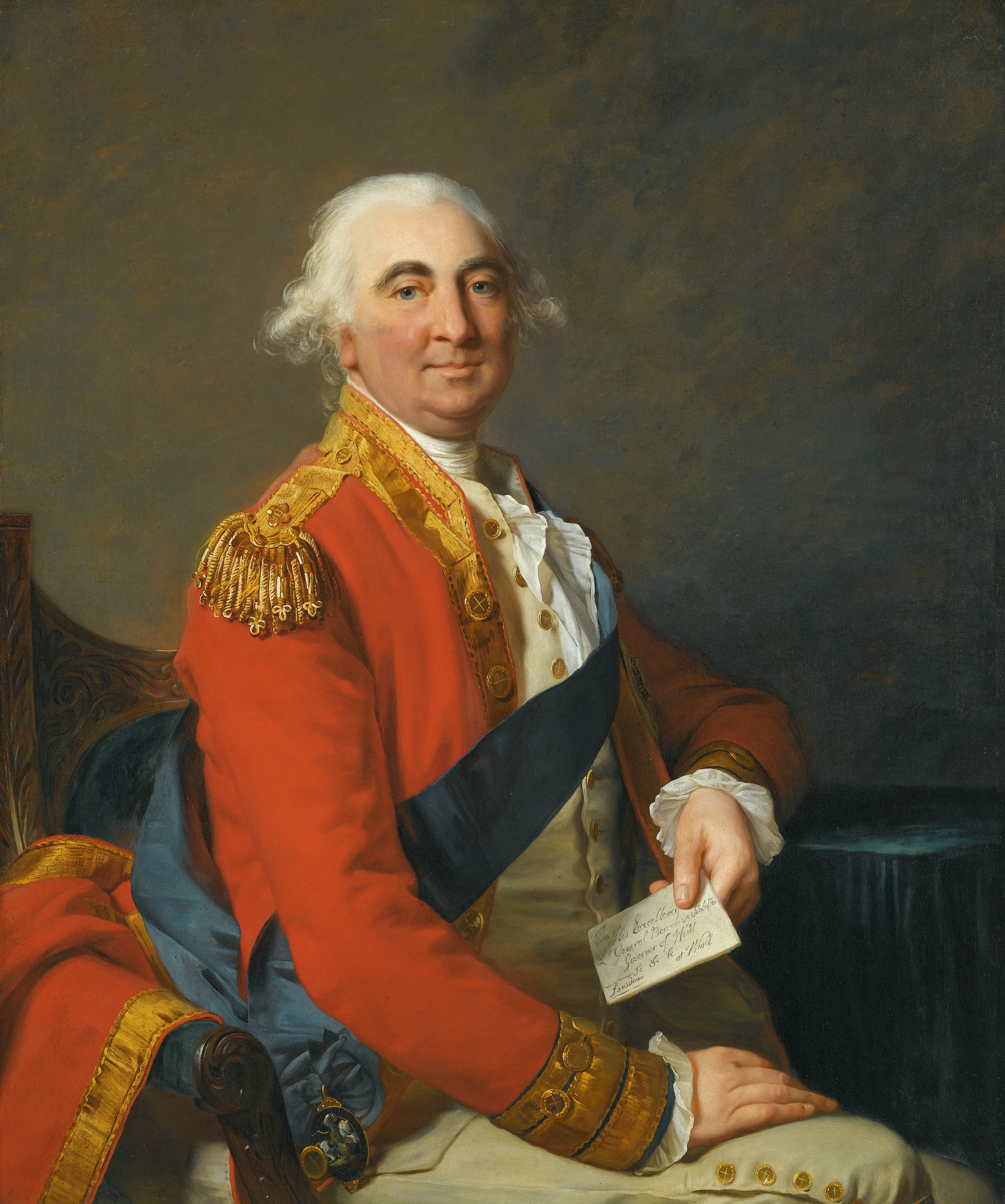
William Petty, 2nd Earl of Shelburne

== Events ==
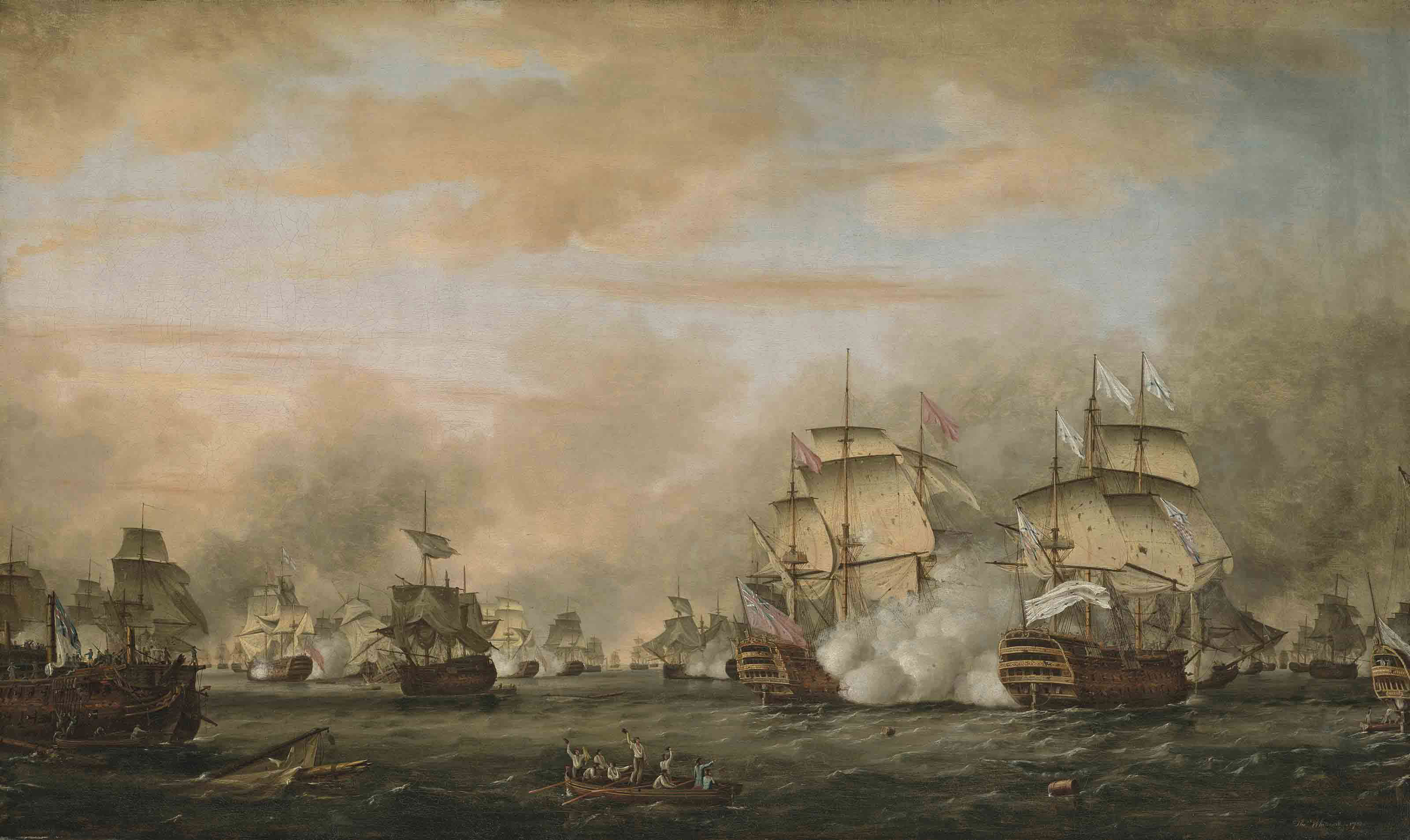
12 April: Battle of the Saintes.

- 23 January – planned town of Johnstone, Scotland, inaugurated.
- 25–26 January – American Revolutionary War: Battle of St. Kitts between French and British fleets.
- 5 February – Spanish defeat British forces and capture Menorca.
- 17 February – American Revolutionary War: Battle of Sadras between French and British fleets.
- 19 March – following a vote of no confidence against the government of Lord North, North resigns as Prime Minister because of recent setbacks in the American Revolutionary War.
- 27 March – Charles Watson-Wentworth, 2nd Marquess of Rockingham, becomes Prime Minister for the second time. His new Whig administration opens peace talks with the Americans, with Thomas Grenville being sent to Paris to negotiate with Benjamin Franklin.
- 1 April – Rockingham appoints the first Home Secretary (William Petty, 2nd Earl of Shelburne) and Foreign Secretary (Charles James Fox).
- 12 April – American Revolutionary War:
  - A British fleet under Admiral Sir George Rodney defeats a French fleet under the Comte de Grasse in the West Indies at the Battle of the Saintes.
  - Battle of Providien.
- April – James Townsend (Whig) is elected for Calne, becoming the first member of parliament of Black African descent.
- 17 May
  - With the Repeal of Act for Securing Dependence of Ireland Act 1782, the Parliament of Great Britain repeals the Dependency of Ireland on Great Britain Act 1719 restoring the Parliament of Ireland's legislative independence.
  - Treaty of Salbai ends the First Anglo-Maratha War.
- 25 May–12 June – American Revolutionary War – Crawford expedition.
- 4 July – Shelburne becomes Prime Minister following the death of Rockingham.
- 6 July – American Revolutionary War: Battle of Negapatam between British and French fleets.
- 19 August – American Revolutionary War: Battle of Blue Licks.
- 24 August – David Tyrie, a naval clerk who has traitorously corresponded with the French, becomes the last man in Britain to be hanged, drawn and quartered, on Southsea Common.
- 29 August – HMS Royal George capsizes at Spithead with the loss of 800 lives.
- September – Nottingham General Hospital opens to patients.
- 3 September – American Revolutionary War: Battle of Trincomalee between French and British fleets.
- 17 September – 1782 Central Atlantic hurricane devastates a Royal Navy fleet off the Grand Banks of Newfoundland with the loss of 3,500 lives.
- 10 October – Sarah Siddons makes a triumphant return to the Drury Lane Theatre in London in the title role of Garrick's adaptation of Thomas Southerne's Isabella, or, The Fatal Marriage.
- 20 October – American Revolutionary War: Battle of Cape Spartel.
- 30 November – American Revolutionary War: In Paris, representatives from the United States and Great Britain sign preliminary peace articles (later formalised in the Treaty of Paris).
- 12 December – American Revolutionary War: Action of 12 December 1782 – a naval engagement off Ferrol, Spain, in which the British 40-gun fifth rate HMS Mediator (1782) commanded by James Luttrell successfully attacks a convoy of French and American ships attempting to supply the United States.

=== Ongoing events ===
- Second Anglo-Mysore War 1780–1784.

=== Undated ===
- Relief of the Poor Act ("Gilbert's Act") provides for organisation of poor relief on a county basis, coming into effect 25 March 1783.
- In the case of Folkes v. Chadd, litigation regarding the silting of Wells Harbour in Norfolk, Lord Mansfield, Lord Chief Justice of the King's Bench, allows leading civil engineer John Smeaton, to provide scientific evidence, origin of modern rules on acceptance of expert witnesses.
- First Foot Patrol in London.
- Parliament extends James Watt's patent for the steam engine to the year 1800.

=== Publications ===
- Fanny Burney's novel Cecilia (anonymously).
- William Cowper's comic ballad The Diverting History of John Gilpin (anonymously in the Public Advertiser).
- William Gilpin's Observations on the River Wye, and Several Parts of South Wales, etc. relative chiefly to Picturesque Beauty; made in the summer of the year 1770.
- Edmund Malone's Cursory Observations on the Poems Attributed to Thomas Rowley (debunking Chatterton's hoax).

== Births ==
- 5 January – Robert Morrison, Protestant missionary to China (died 1834)
- 22 March – James Parke, judge (died 1868)
- 3 June – Charles Waterton, naturalist and explorer (died 1865)
- 10 August – Charles James Napier, general and Commander-in-Chief in India (died 1853)
- 1 November – Frederick John Robinson, 1st Viscount Goderich, Prime Minister of the United Kingdom (died 1859)

== Deaths ==
- 18 January – John Pringle, physician (born 1707)
- 27 April – William Talbot, 1st Earl Talbot, politician (born 1710)
- 20 May – William Emerson, mathematician (born 1701)
- May – Richard Wilson, painter (born 1714)
- 14 June – Edward Ligonier, 1st Earl Ligonier soldier and courtier (born 1740)
- 1 July – Charles Watson-Wentworth, 2nd Marquess of Rockingham, Prime Minister (born 1730)
- 27 December – Henry Home, Lord Kames, advocate and philosopher (born 1697)

== See also ==
- 1782 in Wales
