= 1858 in the United Kingdom =

Events from the year 1858 in the United Kingdom.

We can conquer India; ...but we cannot clean the River Thames.

== Incumbents ==
- Monarch – Victoria
- Prime Minister – Henry Temple, 3rd Viscount Palmerston (Whig) (until 19 February); Edward Smith-Stanley, 14th Earl of Derby (Conservative) (starting 20 February)

== Events ==
- January – The first GPO wall-fitted post boxes are put into place and agreed for general adoption.
- 25 January
  - The "Wedding March" by Felix Mendelssohn becomes a popular wedding recessional after it is played on this day at the marriage of Queen Victoria's daughter Victoria, "Vicky" the Princess Royal, to Prince Friedrich of Prussia in St James's Palace, London.
  - Chatham railway station in Kent welcomes its first rail passengers.
- 30 January – Hallé Orchestra founded by Charles Hallé in Manchester.
- 31 January – I. K. Brunel's SS Great Eastern, the largest ship built to date, is launched on the River Thames.
- 13 February – Richard Francis Burton and John Hanning Speke become the first Europeans to discover Lake Tanganyika.
- 21 February – Palmerston resigns as Prime Minister, following the rejection of a counter-terrorism bill in the wake of the Orsini affair. He is replaced by the Earl of Derby, forming a new Conservative government.
- 1 March – The English Woman's Journal is established by Barbara Bodichon, Matilda Hays, Bessie Rayner Parkes (the editor) and others to discuss women's equality issues.
- 10 April – Big Ben, the Great Bell for the Palace of Westminster's clock tower in London, is recast at Whitechapel Bell Foundry.
- 29 April – Charles Dickens embarks on his first professional tour giving readings from his works. This will comprise 129 appearances in 49 different towns throughout England, Scotland and Ireland.
- May – Court for Divorce and Matrimonial Causes first sits (with Sir Cresswell Cresswell as judge in ordinary) following coming into effect of the Matrimonial Causes Act 1857 making civil divorce without parliamentary approval legally possible.
- 3 May – William Powell Frith's painting The Derby Day is first exhibited at the Royal Academy, attracting crowds.
- 15 May – A new Royal Opera House, Covent Garden, opens.
- 24 June – The Sovereign and Illustrious Order of Saint John of Jerusalem, Anglia declared.
- 1 July – Papers by Charles Darwin and Alfred Russel Wallace announcing a theory of evolution by natural selection read at the Linnean Society of London.
- 2 July – Great Stink: the stench of sewage from the River Thames affects work in the House of Commons.
- 17 July – Salvage of the Lutine bell, which is subsequently hung in Lloyd's of London.
- 26 July – Lionel de Rothschild takes his seat as the first Jewish Member of Parliament.
- 28 July – In Bengal, British official William Herschel uses a hand impression of Rajyadhar Konai as a contract fingerprint signature.
- 2 August
  - The Government of India Act, passed by Parliament, transfers the territories of the British East India Company and their administration to the direct rule of the British Crown, through a Secretary of State for India. John Stuart Mill has such little faith in the competence of the Government Committee for India that he twice refuses to serve on it.
  - Metropolis Local Management Amendment Act passed as a result of the Great Stink to empower the Metropolitan Board of Works to construct Joseph Bazalgette's improved London sewer system.
  - Medical Act 1858 passed "to Regulate the Qualifications of Practitioners in Medicine and Surgery".
- 3 August – Explorer John Hanning Speke discovers Lake Victoria, source of the River Nile.
- 16 August – American President James Buchanan inaugurates the new trans-Atlantic telegraph cable by exchanging greetings with Queen Victoria. However, a weak signal will force a shutdown of the service on 1 September.
- 26 August – The Anglo-Japanese Treaty of Amity and Commerce signed.
- August – Reforming educator Dorothea Beale takes up her duties as Principal of Cheltenham Ladies' College.
- 1 September
  - Local Government Act 1858 comes into force, General Board of Health abolished.
  - Lighthouse on Bishop Rock, Isles of Scilly, first illuminated.
- 30 October – Bradford sweets poisoning: 21 people are killed and 200 more suffer arsenic poisoning when arsenic is accidentally substituted for plaster in adulterating sweets sold in Bradford market.
- 1 December – The recently formed Odontological Society of London opens the Dental Hospital of London.

=== Undated ===
- Mirror galvanometer invented by William Thomson, 1st Baron Kelvin.
- The Miners Association established in Cornwall.

== Publications ==
- Frederic Farrar's moral schoolboy novel Eric, or, Little by Little.
- Gray's Anatomy, 1st edn.
- Anthony Trollope's novel Doctor Thorne.

== Births ==
- 22 January
  - Frederick Lugard, 1st Baron Lugard, soldier, explorer and colonial administrator (died 1945)
  - Beatrice Webb, née Potter, socialist, economist and reformer (died 1943)
- 26 January – Arthur Winnington-Ingram, Bishop of London (died 1946)
- 10 March – Henry Watson Fowler, lexicographer (died 1933)
- 23 April – Ethel Smyth, composer and a leader of the women's suffrage movement (died 1944)
- 26 May – Horace Smith-Dorrien, general (died 1930)
- 8 June – Charlotte Scott, mathematician (died 1931)
- 14 July – Emmeline Pankhurst, suffragette (died 1928)
- 15 August – E. Nesbit, children's novelist (died 1924)
- 19 August
  - Alfred Dyke Acland, military officer (died 1937)
  - Ellen Willmott, horticulturalist (died 1934)
- 16 September
  - Edward Marshall Hall, defence barrister (died 1927)
  - Bonar Law, Canadian-born Prime Minister of the United Kingdom (died 1923)
- 11 October – Frederick Kerr, actor (died 1933)
- 20 October – John Burns, trade unionist, politician and historian (died 1943)

== Deaths ==
- 4 January – Amelia Griffiths, phycologist (born 1768)
- 8 January – Caroline Cornwallis, scholar, writer and reformer (born 1786)
- 7 April – Henry Piddington, merchant captain in the East (born 1797)
- 17 April – James Abercromby, 1st Baron Dunfermline, politician (born 1776)
- 3 June – Edward Moxon, poet and publisher (born 1801)
- 10 June – Robert Brown, botanist (born 1773)
- 16 June – John Snow, epidemiologist (born 1813)
- 28 June – Jane Marcet, science writer (born 1769)
- 5 August – Alexis Soyer, chef (born 1810 in France)
- 9 September – Thomas Assheton Smith, politician and cricketer (born 1776)
- 3 November – Harriet Taylor Mill, philosopher and women's rights advocate (born 1807)
- 17 November – Robert Owen, founder of the Co-operative Society (born 1771)
- 20 November – Sir Joseph Bailey, 1st Baronet, ironmaster (born 1783)
- 23 November – Edmund Lyons, 1st Baron Lyons, admiral (born 1790)
- 28 November – Robert Pearse Gillies, Scottish poet and writer (born 1789)
- 29 December – Richard Cheslyn, cricketer (born 1797)
