= 1759 in Great Britain =

Events from the year 1759 in Great Britain. This year was dubbed an "Annus Mirabilis" due to a succession of military victories in the Seven Years' War against French-led opponents.

== Incumbents ==
- Monarch – George II
- Prime Minister – Thomas Pelham-Holles, 1st Duke of Newcastle (Whig)

== Events ==
- 15 January – the British Museum opens at Montagu House, Bloomsbury in London.
- 8 April – Robert Clive captures Masulipatam in India from the French.
- 1 May – Seven Years' War: British forces capture Guadeloupe from the French.
- 1 May – the foundation of Wedgwood pottery
- 4 July – the Royal Navy bombards Le Havre.
- 23 July – Keel laying of HMS Victory at Chatham Dockyard.
- 25 July – Seven Years' War (French and Indian War): In Canada, British forces capture Fort Niagara from French, who subsequently abandon Fort Rouillé.
- 26–27 July – Seven Years' War (French and Indian War): Battle of Ticonderoga – At the southern end of Lake Champlain, French forces withdraw from Fort Carillon which is taken by the British under General Amherst and renamed Fort Ticonderoga.
- 1 August – Seven Years' War: At the Battle of Minden, British-Hanoverian forces under Ferdinand of Brunswick defeat the French army of the Duc de Broglie, but due to the disobedience of the English cavalry commander Lord George Sackville, the French are able to withdraw unmolested.
- 18 August – Seven Years' War: At the Battle of Lagos, the British fleet of Edward Boscawen defeats a French force under Commodore de la Clue off the Portuguese coast.
- 10 September – Seven Years' War: Battle of Pondicherry – An inconclusive naval battle is fought off the coast of India between the French Admiral d'Aché and the British under George Pocock. The French forces are badly damaged and return home, never returning to India.
- 13 September – Seven Years' War (French and Indian War): Quebec is recaptured by British forces following General Wolfe's victory in the Battle of the Plains of Abraham just outside the city. Both the French Commander (the Marquis de Montcalm) and the British General Wolfe are fatally wounded.
- 14 September – "A Journey Through Europe; or, A Play of Geography", the earliest British board game sold.
- 16 October – Smeaton's Tower, John Smeaton's Eddystone Lighthouse, is first illuminated.
- 20 November – Seven Years' War: At the Battle of Quiberon Bay, the British fleet of Sir Edward Hawke defeats a French fleet under Marshal de Conflans near the coast of Brittany. This is the decisive naval engagement of the War – after this, the French are no longer able to field a significant fleet and a planned French invasion of Britain is abandoned.

=== Unknown dates ===
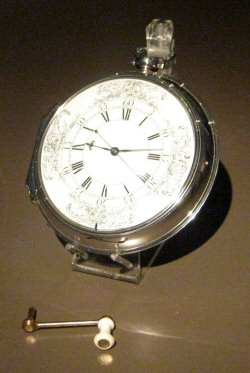
Harrison's marine chronometer

- Clockmaker John Harrison produces his "No. 1 sea watch" ("H4"), the first successful marine chronometer.
- Bank of England £10 note first issued.
- Royal Botanic Gardens, Kew, created.
- The song Heart of Oak is written by William Boyce with words by David Garrick.

== Publications ==
- Samuel Johnson's apologue The History of Rasselas, Prince of Abissinia.
- Adam Smith's The Theory of Moral Sentiments, embodying some of his Glasgow lectures.
- Laurence Sterne begins publication of his comic metafictional novel The Life and Opinions of Tristram Shandy, Gentleman (dated 1760).
- Samuel Dunn's instructional manual The description and use of the universal planispheres; or, terrestrial and celestial globes in plano.

== Births ==
- 25 January – Robert Burns, Scottish poet (died 1796)
- 26 March – John Mayne, Scottish poet (d. 1836)
- 27 April – Mary Wollstonecraft, writer, philosopher and feminist (died 1797)
- 28 May – William Pitt the Younger, Prime Minister (died 1806)
- 7 August – William Owen Pughe, lexicographer (died 1835)
- 12 August – Thomas Andrew Knight, horticulturalist (died 1838)
- 24 August – William Wilberforce, abolitionist (died 1833)
- 19 September – William Kirby, entomologist (died 1850)
- 24 September – Charles Simeon, evangelical clergyman (died 1836)
- 13 October – Mary Hays, writer and feminist (died 1843)
- 25 October – William Grenville, Prime Minister (died 1834)

== Deaths ==
- 11 March – John Forbes, general (born 1707)
- 14 April – George Frideric Handel, composer (born 1685 in Saxony-Anhalt)
- 7 August – John Kennedy, 8th Earl of Cassilis (born 1700)
- 16 August – Eugene Aram, English philologist and murderer, hanged (born 1704)
- 13 September – James Wolfe, general (born 1727)
- 10 October – Granville Elliott, military officer (born 1713)
- 13 October – John Henley, English minister (born 1692)

== See also ==
- 1759 in Wales
