= 1859 in the United Kingdom =

Events from the year 1859 in the United Kingdom.

== Incumbents ==
- Monarch – Victoria
- Prime Minister – Edward Smith-Stanley, 14th Earl of Derby (Conservative) (until 11 June); Henry Temple, 3rd Viscount Palmerston (Liberal) (starting 12 June)

== Events ==
- 1 January – Elizabeth Blackwell becomes the first woman to have her name entered on the General Medical Council's Medical Register, under a clause in the Medical Act 1858 that recognizes doctors with foreign degrees.
- 15 January – The National Portrait Gallery opens in London.
- March – General Post Office begins erections of the First National Standard pillar box design.
- 25 March – Anniversary Days Observance Act 1859 abolishes observance by the established church of the anniversary of the execution ("martyrdom") of Charles I, Oak Apple Day and certain other 17th-century political events.
- 28 April–18 May – 1859 United Kingdom general election: Palmerston (Liberal) defeats Derby (Conservative) following a defeat for the latter in the House of Commons.
- 30 April – Charles Dickens publishes the first issue of his new magazine, All the Year Round, beginning serialisation of A Tale of Two Cities. At the end of the year, it begins serialisation of Wilkie Collins's sensation novel The Woman in White.
- 1 May – West Riding of Yorkshire Penny Savings Bank, predecessor of the Yorkshire Bank, begins operations in Leeds.
- 4 May – The Cornwall Railway is opened across the Royal Albert Bridge, linking the counties of Devon and Cornwall. The bridge's designer, Isambard Kingdom Brunel, who is terminally ill, is wheeled across it later in the month.
- 22 May – The Needles lighthouse on the Isle of Wight is first illuminated.
- 31 May – Big Ben's clock begins working.
- 6 June – The British Crown colony of Queensland in Australia is created by devolving part of the territory of New South Wales.
- 9 June – The House of Lords makes a final decision in the case of Thellusson v Woodford determining the distribution of property left under the will of Peter Thellusson, who died in 1797.
- 12 June – Palmerston takes office as Prime Minister following the resignation of Derby. Palmerston's is considered the first Liberal Party administration, arising from merger of the Whig Party, Peelites and Radicals.
- 28–29 June – The first conformation show for dogs in Britain held at Newcastle upon Tyne.
- 1 September – Astronomer Richard Carrington makes the first observation of a solar flare.
- 7 September – The clock and chimes of the Clock Tower, Palace of Westminster become operational. The great bell acquires the nickname "Big Ben" by association with Benjamin Hall, 1st Baron Llanover.
- 16 September – Charles Vaughan announces his resignation as headmaster of Harrow School, apparently under threat of exposure for an affair with a pupil.
- 1 October – The Odontological Society of London's Dental Hospital of London opens the first dental school in Britain, the London School of Dental Surgery.
- 14 October – Glasgow Town Council's Loch Katrine public water supply scheme is officially opened.
- 25–26 October – Royal Charter Storm, the most severe storm to hit the British Isles this century. 133 ships are sunk and another ninety badly damaged, with a death toll estimated as up to 800 (including some killed on land); most notably from the steam clipper Royal Charter, driven ashore on the north-east coast of Anglesey on 26 October with around 459 dead and just 39 men surviving.
- 12 November – HMS Victoria, the Royal Navy's last and largest wooden first-rate three-decker ship of the line to see sea service, is launched at Portsmouth.
- 24 November – Naturalist Charles Darwin's The Origin of Species, a book which argues that species gradually evolve through natural selection, is published by John Murray in London, immediately selling out its initial print run. Darwin's former mentor William Whewell refuses to allow a copy in the library of Trinity College, Cambridge.

=== Undated ===
- District nursing begins in Liverpool when philanthropist William Rathbone employs Mary Robinson to nurse the sick poor in their own homes.
- Muirkirk becomes the first town in Britain to have gas lighting.
- Welsh religious revival led by Humphrey Jones and large Ulster Christian revival.
- Red House in Bexleyheath, a key building in the Arts and Crafts Movement, is designed by its owner, William Morris, and the architect Philip Webb.

== Publications ==
- Isabella Beeton's compilation Mrs Beeton's Book of Household Management begins publication as a partwork supplement to The Englishwoman's Domestic Magazine (published by her husband Samuel Orchart Beeton) in September.
- Charles Darwin's book The Origin of Species.
- Charles Dickens' novel A Tale of Two Cities.
- George Eliot's novel Adam Bede.
- Edward FitzGerald's poetic translation of the Rubaiyat of Omar Khayyam.
- John Stuart Mill's book On Liberty.
- Christina Rossetti's poem "Goblin Market".
- Samuel Smiles' book Self-Help.
- Alfred Tennyson's poetry cycle Idylls of the King.
- The racing newspaper The Sporting Life is first published (From its launch on 24 March to 30 April it is called Penny Bell's Life & Sporting News).

== Births ==
- 11 January – George Nathaniel Curzon, statesman and Viceroy of India (died 1925)
- 5 February – Ernest Terah Hooley, financial fraudster (died 1947)
- 14 February – Henry Valentine Knaggs, physician and author (died 1954)
- 16 February – T. E. Ellis, politician (died 1899)
- 22 February – George Lansbury, Scottish-born politician and social reformer; leader of the Labour Party from 1932 to 1935 (died 1940)
- 8 March – Kenneth Grahame, author (died 1932)
- 25 March – John Bruce Glasier, Scottish-born socialist politician (died 1920)
- 26 March – A. E. Housman, poet (died 1936)
- 1 April – Mansfield Smith-Cumming, naval officer and first director of the Secret Intelligence Service (died 1923)
- 18 April – Evan Davies Jones, civil engineer (died 1949)
- 2 May – Jerome K. Jerome, author (died 1927)
- 13 May – Kate Marsden, medical missionary (died 1931)
- 22 May – Arthur Conan Doyle, Scottish-born fiction writer (died 1930)
- May – Samuel Thomas Evans, politician and judge (died 1918)
- 9 June – Doveton Sturdee, admiral (died 1925)
- 6 July – Alexander Hamilton-Gordon, general (died 1939)
- 8 July – Annie S. Swan, writer (died 1943)
- 13 July – Sidney Webb, economist and social reformer (died 1947)
- 17 July – Ernest Rhys, writer (died 1946)
- 8 August – Arthur Lowes Dickinson, accountant (died 1935)
- 7 September – Margaret Crosfield, palaeontologist and geologist (died 1952)
- 22 November – Cecil Sharp, folk-song collector (died 1924)
- 5 December – John Jellicoe, admiral (died 1935)
- 27 December – William Henry Hadow, educationalist (died 1937)
- Margaret Manton Merrill, journalist (died 1893 in the United States)

== Deaths ==
- 21 January – Henry Hallam, historian (born 1777)
- 28 January – F. J. Robinson, 1st Viscount Goderich, Prime Minister (born 1782)
- 13 February – Eliza Acton, cookery writer (born 1799)
- 8 April – Sir Joseph Thackwell, general (born 1781)
- 19 April – Christopher Bethell, Bishop of Bangor (born 1773)
- 1 May – John Walker, inventor (born 1781)
- 7 June – David Cox, landscape painter (born 1783)
- 16 July – Charles Cathcart, 2nd Earl Cathcart, general and colonial administrator (born 1783)
- 28 August – Leigh Hunt, critic and essayist (born 1784)
- 15 September – Isambard Kingdom Brunel, civil engineer (born 1806)
- 12 October – Robert Stephenson, railway engineer (born 1803)
- 28 October – Thomas Manders, actor-manager and low comedian (born 1797)
- 4 November – Joseph Rowntree, educationist (born 1801)
- 22 November – George Wilson, chemist (born 1818)
- 8 December – Thomas De Quincey, essayist (born 1785)
- 28 December – Thomas Babington Macaulay, 1st Baron Macaulay, poet, historian and politician (born 1800)
