= 1843 in the United Kingdom =

Events from the year 1843 in the United Kingdom.

== Incumbents ==
- Monarch – Victoria
- Prime Minister – Robert Peel (Conservative)
- Foreign Secretary – George Hamilton-Gordon, 4th Earl of Aberdeen
- Home Secretary – Sir James Graham

== Events ==
- January – Quaker magazine The Friend begins publication.
- 6 January – Antarctic explorer James Clark Ross discovers Snow Hill Island.
- 20 January – Daniel M'Naghten shoots and kills the Prime Minister's private secretary, Edward Drummond, in Whitehall.
- 4 March – M'Naghten is found not guilty of murder "by reason of insanity", giving rise to the M'Naghten Rules on criminal responsibility, and subsequently committed to Bethlem Hospital.
- 24 March – Battle of Hyderabad: The Bombay Army led by Major General Sir Charles Napier defeats the Talpur Mirs, securing Sindh province for the British Raj.
- 25 March – Marc Isambard Brunel's Thames Tunnel, the first tunnel under the River Thames, is opened to pedestrians.
- 27 March – A decision in Foss v Harbottle, a leading precedent in English corporate law, declares that in any action in which a wrong is alleged to have been done to a company, the proper claimant is the company itself and not individual shareholders.
- 4 April – William Wordsworth accepts the office of Poet Laureate of the United Kingdom following the death of Robert Southey on 21 March.
- April – Protestant Martyrs' Memorial erected in Oxford.
- 4 May – Natal proclaimed British colony.
- 18 May – The Disruption of the Church of Scotland takes place in Edinburgh.
- ? May – Blackgang Chine on the Isle of Wight opens as an amusement park.
- 19 July – Isambard Kingdom Brunel's SS Great Britain is launched from Bristol.
- 5 August – Sarah Dazley, the last woman to be executed in public in England, is hanged for mariticide outside Bedford Prison.
- 22 August – Theatres Act ends the virtual monopoly on theatrical performances held by the patent theatres, encouraging the development of popular entertainment.
- September – Ada Lovelace translates and expands Menabrea's notes on Charles Babbage's analytical engine, including an algorithm for calculating a sequence of Bernoulli numbers, regarded as the world's first computer program.
- 2 September – The Economist newspaper first published (preliminary issue dated August).
- 1 October – News of the World newspaper first published. It will run until 2011.
- 3–4 November – The statue of Nelson is placed atop Nelson's Column in Trafalgar Square, London.
- 13 December – Basutoland becomes a British protectorate.
- 17 December – Publication of Charles Dickens' novella A Christmas Carol by Chapman & Hall in London at his expense. It introduces the character Ebenezer Scrooge. Released on 19 December, the first printing sells out by Christmas Eve and inspires charitable giving.
- December – The world's first Christmas cards, commissioned by Sir Henry Cole in London from the artist John Callcott Horsley, are sent.
- Undated
  - The Albert helmet, devised in 1842 by the Prince Consort, is adopted by the Household Cavalry.
  - Liverpool Victoria Friendly Society founded as a burial society.
  - Marlborough College founded in Wiltshire for the education of the sons of Church of England clergy.
  - Alfred Bird produces baking powder for the first time, in Birmingham.

== Publications ==
- Charles Dickens's novel Martin Chuzzlewit (begins serialisation January) and novella A Christmas Carol.
- John Stuart Mill's book A System of Logic.
- John Ruskin's book Modern Painters, vol. 1.
- Robert Smith Surtees' comic novel Handley Cross.

== Births ==
- 25 April – Princess Alice, member of the royal family (died 1878)
- 30 June – Ernest Mason Satow, diplomat and scholar (died 1929)
- 5 July – Mandell Creighton, historian and Bishop of London (died 1901)
- 4 September – Jabez Balfour, businessman, politician and fraudster (died 1916)

== Deaths ==
- 9 January – William Hedley, inventor and locomotive engineer (born 1779)
- 20 February – Mary Hays, writer and feminist (born 1759)
- 21 March – Robert Southey, poet (born 1774)
- 25 March – Robert Murray M'Cheyne, clergyman (born 1813)
- 21 April – Prince Augustus Frederick, Duke of Sussex (born 1773)
- 1 June – William Abbot, actor (born 1798)
- 25 July – Charles Macintosh, Scottish chemist (born 1766)
- 16 August – Henry Acton, Unitarian minister (born 1797)
- 18 December – Thomas Graham, Lord Lynedoch, Governor-General of India (born 1748)
