= 1844 in the United Kingdom =

Events from the year 1844 in the United Kingdom.

== Incumbents ==
- Monarch – Victoria
- Prime Minister – Robert Peel (Conservative)
- Foreign Secretary – George Hamilton-Gordon, 4th Earl of Aberdeen
- Home Secretary – Sir James Graham

== Events ==
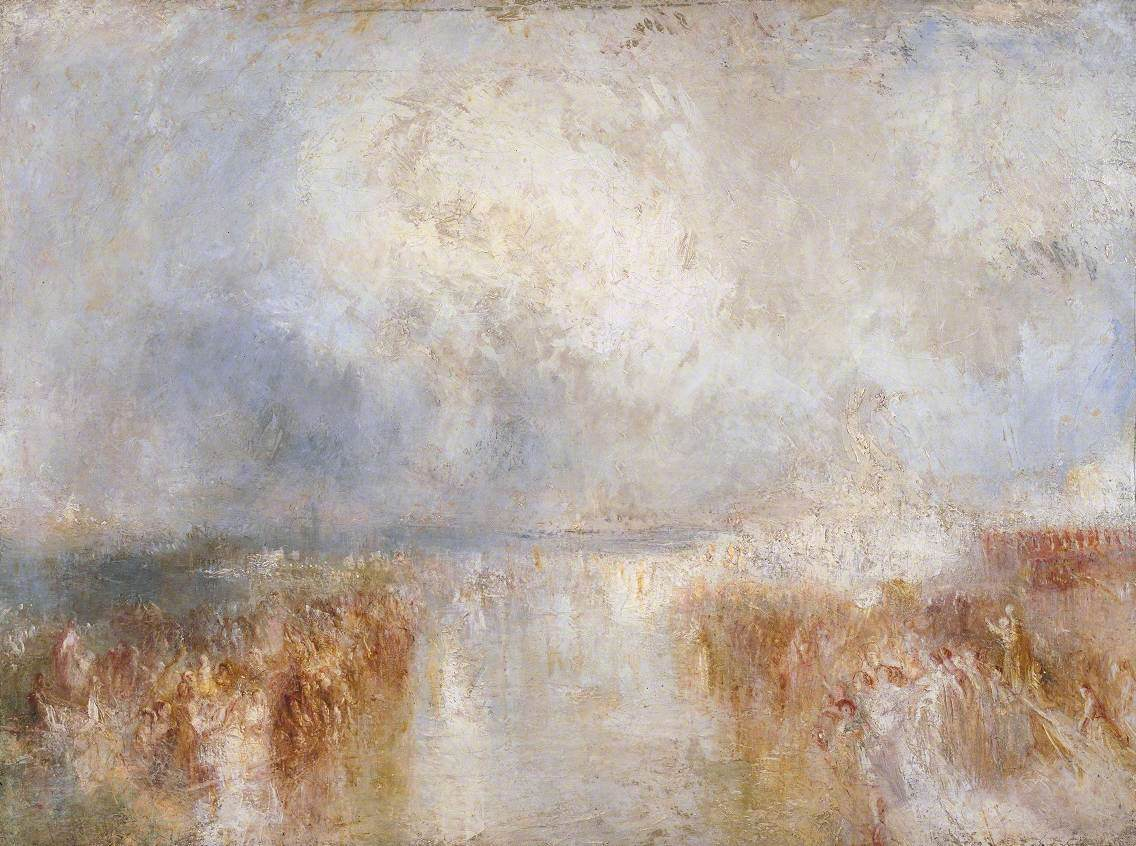
The Arrival of Louis-Philippe at Portsmouth by J.M.W. Turner, 8 October

The Royal Exchange (London), opened by Queen Victoria on 28 October

- 28 February – The Grand National at Aintree is won by the 5/1 joint favourite Discount.
- 11 April – Initiation of the Ragged Schools Union.
- 14 April – The murder of Charlotte Dymond in Cornwall.
- 11 May – Major fire at Lyme Regis.
- May – Henry Hardinge, 1st Viscount Hardinge, appointed as Governor-General of India.
- 6 June – George Williams founds the Young Men's Christian Association (YMCA) in London.
- 15 June – Factory Act imposes a maximum 12-hour working day for women, and a maximum 6-hour day for children aged 6 to 13.
- 19 July – Bank Charter Act restricts powers of British banks other than the Bank of England to issue banknotes of the pound sterling.
- 21 & 27 August – Consecration of two new major urban Roman Catholic churches, both designed by Augustus Pugin, which will in the 1850s be elevated to cathedral status: St Mary's Church, Newcastle upon Tyne and St Barnabas Church, Nottingham. (In October, Pugin occupies The Grange, Ramsgate, a house designed for himself which is influential in the development of domestic Gothic Revival architecture.)
- 28 September – A blackdamp explosion at Haswell Colliery in the Durham Coalfield kills 95, with just four survivors.
- 8 October – Louis-Phillipe, King of the French, arrives in Portsmouth on a visit to Britain.
- 20 October – Counties (Detached Parts) Act 1844 comes into effect, eliminating many outliers or exclaves of counties in England and Wales for civil purposes.
- 28 October – The Royal Exchange in London opened by Queen Victoria.
- 11 December – Health of Towns Association formed to press for public health improvements.
- 21 December – The Rochdale Pioneers, usually considered the first successful cooperative enterprise, open their store in Rochdale, forming the basis for the modern cooperative movement.

=== Undated ===
- Winsford rock salt mine opens in Cheshire; by 2014 it will be Britain's oldest working mine.
- Ring of bells installed at St John the Evangelist's Church, Kirkham (Lancashire), said to be the first peal rung in an English Roman Catholic church since the Reformation.
- "Surplice riots" in Exeter and London break out in opposition to supposed Catholicisation of the Church of England.
- King Frederick Augustus II of Saxony makes an informal summer tour of Britain.

== Publications ==
- Robert Chambers' anonymous Vestiges of the Natural History of Creation, which paves the way for acceptance of Darwin's The Origin of Species.
- Charles Dickens' novel Martin Chuzzlewit (complete in book form) and his Christmas novella The Chimes.
- Benjamin Disraeli's novel Coningsby.
- Henry Fox Talbot's book The Pencil of Nature, the first illustrated with photographs from a camera (publication commences June).
- William Makepeace Thackeray's novel The Luck of Barry Lyndon (serialisation).

== Births ==
- 26 February – Annie Swynnerton, née Robinson, ARA, painter (died 1933)
- 3 May – Richard D'Oyly Carte, theatrical impresario (died 1901)
- 22 July – William Archibald Spooner, scholar, Anglican priest and metathesist (died 1930)
- 28 July – Gerard Manley Hopkins, English poet (died 1889)
- 6 August – Alfred, Duke of Saxe-Coburg and Gotha, second son of Queen Victoria (died 1900)
- 29 August – Edward Carpenter, socialist poet (died 1929)
- 23 October – Robert Bridges, English poet (died 1930)
- 25 October – Arthur William à Beckett, journalist (died 1909)

== Deaths ==
- 23 January – Sir Francis Burdett, politician (born 1770)
- 15 February – Henry Addington, 1st Viscount Sidmouth, Prime Minister of the United Kingdom (born 1757)
- 6 March – George Meikle Kemp, architect (born 1795)
- 18 March – Paul Storr, silversmith (born 1770)
- 3 April – Edward Bigge, Archdeacon of Lindisfarne (born 1807)
- 27 July – John Dalton, chemist and physicist (born 1766)
- 23 November – Thomas Henderson, Scottish astronomer (born 1798)
- 25 November – Sir Augustus Callcott, landscape painter (born 1779)
