= 1803 in the United Kingdom =

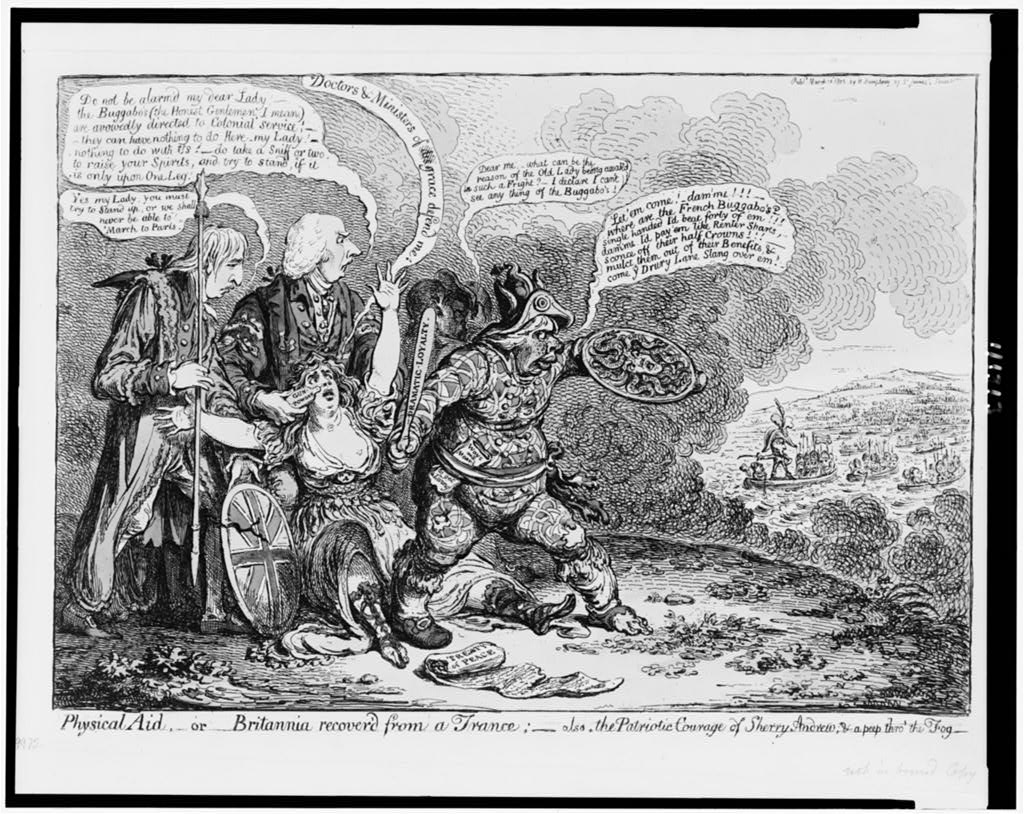
1803 political cartoon

Events from the year 1803 in the United Kingdom.

== Incumbents ==
- Monarch – George III
- Prime Minister – Henry Addington (Tory)
- Foreign Secretary – Lord Hawkesbury
- Secretary of War – Lord Hobart

== Events ==
- 4 January – William Symington demonstrates his Charlotte Dundas, the "first practical steamboat".
- 21 February – Colonel Edward Despard, a radical Anglo-Irish former British Army officer and colonial official, and six others are hanged for their part in the previous year's Despard Plot (apparently intended to assassinate King George III and seize key positions such as the Bank of England and Tower of London). This is the last time anyone has been sentenced to be hanged, drawn and quartered in England, although prior to execution the sentence has been commuted to simple hanging and beheading, which is carried out on the gatehouse roof at Horsemonger Lane Gaol in London before a crowd of at least 20,000, one of the largest public gatherings ever up to this date.
- 2 April – Easton Massacre: British sailors shoot and kill three men, and fatally injure a woman, at Easton, Dorset, during an unlawful attempt to press men of the village into service.
- 18 May – Napoleonic Wars: The U.K. redeclares war on France after France refuses to withdraw from Dutch territory.
- 25 May – Speaker of the House of Commons Charles Abbot allows journalists to report the proceedings of the House of Commons.
- June – Britain captures Tobago and Saint Lucia from France.
- 9 June – Matthew Flinders completes the first known circumnavigation of Australia.
- 24 June – Lord Ellenborough's Act (the Malicious Stabbings or Shooting Act) includes a provision that makes abortion a crime for the first time, also introducing a crime of 'concealment of birth' which might be charged when infanticide cannot be proved.
- 23 July – Emmet's insurrection in Ireland: United Irishman Robert Emmet stages a rising in Dublin which is quelled by the military, with approximately fifty rebels and twenty soldiers dead. The Lord Chief Justice of Ireland, Lord Kilwarden, is hacked to death.
- 26 July – The Surrey Iron Railway, a horse-worked wagonway between Wandsworth and Croydon, is opened for goods, being the first public railway line in England.
- 27 July – Caledonian Canal authorized by Act of Parliament and construction begins; Thomas Telford also begins work on improving roads in Scotland.
- 8 August – British troops commanded by General Arthur Wellesley (later the 1st Duke of Wellington) begin the Second Anglo-Maratha War against the Scindia rulers of Gwalior.
- 6 September – John Dalton FRS composes his five main points of atomic theory, the first to do so.
- 20 September – Irish rebel Robert Emmet is hanged for high treason in Dublin.
- 23 September – Battle of Assaye in India: British-led troops commanded by General Wellesley defeat Maratha forces.
- 21 October – John Dalton presents a paper to the Manchester Literary and Philosophical Society containing the first table of atomic weights.

=== Ongoing ===
- Anglo-Spanish War, 1796–1808

=== Undated ===
- Smithson Tennant discovers the chemical elements iridium and osmium.
- William Hyde Wollaston discovers the chemical element rhodium.
- Robert Ransome invents the self-sharpening chilled cast-iron ploughshare in Ipswich.
- Frederick Albert Winsor gives a demonstration of gas lighting at the old Lyceum Theatre, London.
- The British Army adopts the anti-personnel shell invented by Henry Shrapnel.
- Pantaloons sanctioned for wear on military campaigns.
- Martello towers planned to protect the coasts of south east England against the threat of French invasion.
- Joseph Lancaster publishes Improvements in Education as it Respects the Industrious Classes.
- Humphry Repton publishes Observations on the Theory and Practice of Landscape Gardening.
- Jane Porter's historical novel Thaddeus of Warsaw is published, immediately going through several editions.
- Jane Austen's novel Northanger Abbey, a satire on Gothic fiction, is advertised by a London publisher but is not in fact published until 1817, after her death.

== Births ==
- 20 May – Ann Walker, landowner, philanthropist (died 1854)
- 25 May – Edward Bulwer-Lytton, novelist and playwright (died 1873)
- 24 June – George James Webb, English-born composer (died 1887)
- 3 August – Joseph Paxton, gardener and architect (died 1865)
- 16 October – Robert Stephenson, engineer (died 1859)
- 6 December – Susanna Moodie, writer (died 1885)
- 21 December – Joseph Whitworth, engineer and entrepreneur (died 1887)
- Undated – George Myers, master builder (died 1875)

== Deaths ==
- 23 January – Arthur Guinness, Irish brewer (born 1725)
- 2 April – Sir James Montgomery, 1st Baronet, politician and judge (born 1721)
- 6 April – William Hamilton, diplomat (born 1730)
- 19 April – Thomas Jones, landscape painter (born 1742)
- 8 May – John Joseph Merlin, clock- and musical-instrument-maker and inventor (born 1735 in Liège)
- 3 June – Lord George Murray, Bishop of St David's and developer of the UK's first optical telegraph (born 1761)
- 8 July – Frederick Hervey, 4th Earl of Bristol, Anglican Bishop of Derry, art collector and philanthropist (born 1730)
- 26 October – Granville Leveson-Gower, 1st Marquess of Stafford, politician (born 1721)
