= 1814 in the United Kingdom =

Events from the year 1814 in the United Kingdom.

== Incumbents ==
- Monarch – George III
- Regent – George, Prince Regent
- Prime Minister – Robert Jenkinson, 2nd Earl of Liverpool (Tory)
- Foreign Secretary – Robert Stewart, Viscount Castlereagh
- Home Secretary – Henry Addington, Viscount Sidmouth
- Secretary of War – Lord Bathurst

== Events ==
=== January ===
- 14 January
  - Treaty of Kiel cedes Danish Heligoland to the United Kingdom.
  - Troopship Queen, newly returned from Spain, is driven ashore and wrecked on Trefusis Point near Mylor, Cornwall with the probable loss of at least 300.
  - The third-coldest month in the CET series with an average of −2.9 °C or 26.8 °F allows the last River Thames frost fair in London.
- 26 January – Actor Edmund Kean makes his London debut in an adult leading role as Shylock at the Theatre Royal, Drury Lane.

=== February ===
- 12 February – A fire destroys the Custom House in the City of London.
- 21 February – Great Stock Exchange Fraud in London.

=== April ===
- 1 April – The Gas Light and Coke Company begins the world's first permanent public gas lighting of streets in the parish of St Margaret's, Westminster, extending to other parts of London by 25 December.
- 10 April – The Duke of Wellington wins the Battle of Toulouse, ending the Peninsular War.
- 24 April – Allied sovereigns' visit to England concludes with naval review in Portsmouth. Wellington joins the foreign dignitaries.
- 28 April – First running of the 1,000 Guineas Stakes horse race at Newmarket, won by Charlotte.

=== May ===
- 5 May – War of 1812: The British attack Fort Ontario at Oswego, New York.
- 30 May – Treaty of Paris: the United Kingdom takes control of Malta, Tobago, Saint Lucia, and Mauritius from France.

=== June ===
- 22 June – First cricket match is played at Lord's Cricket Ground in St John's Wood.
- 23 June – After five years away, having led Allied forces to victory in the Peninsular War, the Duke of Wellington arrives in Dover to a rapturous reception.

=== July ===
- 5 July – War of 1812: Battle of Chippewa – American Major General Jacob Brown defeats British General Phineas Riall at Chippewa, Ontario.
- 25 July
  - War of 1812: Battle of Lundy's Lane – Reinforcements arrive near Niagara Falls, Ontario, for General Riall's British and Canadian force, and a bloody, all-night battle with Jacob Brown's Americans commences at 18.00; Americans retreat to Fort Erie.
  - George Stephenson puts his first steam locomotive into service, the Blücher for Killingworth Colliery on Tyneside.
- 26 July – Opening of Ryde Pier on the Isle of Wight, the first pier in the United Kingdom.
- 28 July–13 September – Poet Percy Bysshe Shelley abandons his pregnant wife and runs away with the sixteen-year-old Mary Wollstonecraft Godwin, accompanied by her stepsister Jane Clairmont (also 16), to France and Switzerland.

=== August ===
- 1 August – The Grand Jubilee of 1814 is held celebrating the hundredth anniversary of the Hanoverian Succession.
- 12 August – The last hanging under the Black Act in England is of William Potter for cutting down an orchard; the judge petitions for reprieve.
- 13 August – The Anglo-Dutch Treaty of 1814 is signed in London, returning most possessions of the Dutch Empire acquired by the United Kingdom since 1803 to the Netherlands, although the United Kingdom retains the Cape of Good Hope and the South American settlements of Demerara, Essequibo and Berbice (later consolidated as British Guiana). In addition, Britain cedes the island of Banca off the island of Sumatra in exchange for the settlement of Cochin in India.
- 24 August – War of 1812: The Burning of Washington: British troops burn Washington, D.C.
- 28 August – Alexandria, Virginia, offers surrender to the British fleet without a fight.

=== September ===
- 10 September – The last recorded duel in Wales is fought at Newcastle Emlyn: Thomas Heslop of Jamaica is killed; a local landowner, Beynon, is found guilty and fined one shilling.

=== October ===
- 17 October – London Beer Flood: a large vat of porter in Meux's Brewery bursts, demolishing buildings and killing nine.
- 18 October – British troop transport Sovereign is wrecked on St. Paul Island (Nova Scotia) with the loss of between 199 and 212 of the 237 people on board.
- 23 October – The first plastic surgery carried out in England by Dr Joseph Constantine Carpue.

=== November ===
- 29 November – The first edition of The Times to be printed using a steam press.

=== December ===
- 24 December – Treaty of Ghent signed by the United Kingdom and the United States ending the War of 1812, however due to the time it takes for news to reach America, fighting continues for weeks.

=== Ongoing ===
- Napoleonic Wars, 1803–1815

=== Undated ===
- Jeremiah Colman begins making Colman's mustard at Stoke Holy Cross mill near Norwich.
- James Purdey establishes his gunmaking business in London.
- John Abernethy appointed lecturer in anatomy to the Royal College of Surgeons.
- John Keats leaves apprenticeship to become a student at a local hospital.
- The Benedictine monastic community is established at Downside in Somerset.

== Publications ==
- Jane Austen's (anonymous) novel Mansfield Park.
- Fanny Burney's last work, the historical novel The Wanderer: or, Female Difficulties.
- Lord Byron's tales in verse The Corsair (sells 10,000 copies on publication day (1 February) and over 25,000 in the first month, going through seven editions) and Lara (sells 6,000 copies on publication in the summer).
- Henry Cary's blank verse translation of Dante's Divine Comedy (complete).
- Walter Scott's (anonymous) first prose work, the historical novel Waverley (sells out within 2 days of publication (7 July)).
- William Wordsworth's long poem The Excursion.

== Births ==
- 7 January – Robert Nicoll, Scottish radical journalist and poet (died 1837)
- 21 April – Angela Burdett-Coutts, philanthropist (died 1906)
- 8 June – Charles Reade, novelist and dramatist (died 1884)
- 28 June – Frederick William Faber, poet, hymnodist, theologian and Catholic convert (died 1863)
- 28 August – Sheridan le Fanu, Irish-born writer (died 1873)
- 3 September – James Joseph Sylvester, mathematician (died 1897)
- 7 September – William Butterfield, architect (died 1900)
- 28 December – John Bennet Lawes, agricultural scientist (died 1900)

== Deaths ==
- 27 January – Philip Astley, circus promoter (born 1742)
- 8 April – Julia Shuckburgh-Evelyn, aristocrat (born 1790)
- 12 April – Charles Burney, music historian (born 1726)
- 12 July – William Howe, 5th Viscount Howe, general (born 1729)
- 19 July – Captain Matthew Flinders, explorer of the coasts of Australia (born 1774)
- 25 July – Charles Dibdin, composer (born 1745)
- 31 August – Arthur Phillip, admiral and first governor of New South Wales (born 1738)
- 18 November – William Jessop, civil engineer (born 1745)
- 22 November – Edward Rushton, abolitionist and pioneer of education for the blind (born 1756)
- 9 December – Joseph Bramah, inventor and locksmith (born 1748)
