= 1850 in the United Kingdom =

Events from the year 1850 in the United Kingdom.

== Incumbents ==
- Monarch – Victoria
- Prime Minister – Lord John Russell (Whig)
- Foreign Secretary – Henry John Temple, 3rd Viscount Palmerston

== Events ==
- 18 January – Don Pacifico affair: Lord Palmerston, the Foreign Secretary, sends a Royal Navy squadron to blockade the port of Piraeus in the Aegean Sea in defence of the interests of a British citizen, causing a diplomatic incident with Russia and France.
- 5 March – Opening of Robert Stephenson's Britannia Bridge carrying the Chester and Holyhead Railway across the Menai Strait between the island of Anglesey and the mainland of Wales.
- 9 March – The Judicial Committee of the Privy Council delivers judgement in a case brought on appeal by Rev. George Cornelius Gorham which effectively gives the civil courts power to determine the doctrine of the Church of England.
- 30 March – The paddle steamer RMS Royal Adelaide (1838), bound from Cork to London, sinks off Margate with the loss of all 250 on board.
- 4 April – North London Collegiate School for girls established in new premises with Frances Buss as Principal.
- 19 April – Clayton–Bulwer Treaty signed between the United Kingdom and the United States agreeing that neither nation is to colonize or control any Central American republic. The purpose is to prevent one country from building a canal across the isthmus that the other would not be able to use.
- 25 May – The hippopotamus Obaysch arrives at London Zoo from Egypt, the first to live in the British Isles since prehistoric times.
- 27 June – Eccentric Robert Pate physically assaults Queen Victoria with his cane in Piccadilly (London).
- 29 June – Don Pacifico affair: Palmerston defends his action robustly in Parliament.
- 3 July – The Koh-i-Noor diamond is presented to Queen Victoria.
- July–August – 'Great Stink': Hot weather exacerbates the effects of untreated sewage discharged into the River Thames in London.
- 5 August – Colonies of New South Wales, South Australia, Tasmania, and Victoria granted representative government.
- 14 August
  - Liberties Act provides a mechanism to enable the various liberties or independent jurisdictions in England and Wales to be merged into the geographical counties in which they lie.
  - Irish Franchise Act increases the rural electorate in Ireland.
- 27 August – A telegraph cable is laid beneath the English Channel from Dover to Cap Gris Nez in France but does not function.
- 4 September – The "First Four Ships" chartered by the Canterbury Association (Randolph, Sir George Seymour, Cressy and Charlotte Jane (sails 4 days later)) set sail from Gravesend, then from Plymouth, carrying settlers (the "Canterbury Pilgrims") bound for New Zealand, where they will establish the city of Christchurch. The first two of the ships arrive at Lyttelton Harbour on 16 December.
- 29 September – By the Bull Universalis Ecclesiae, Pope Pius IX recreates the Roman Catholic hierarchy in England and Wales, which had become extinct with the death of the last Marian bishop in the reign of Elizabeth I, a move held by many Protestants to constitute "papal aggression". Nicholas Wiseman is appointed first Archbishop of Westminster and elevated to Cardinal. He issues a pastoral letter, From Without the Flaminian Gate, and on 21 November is enthroned in St George's Cathedral, Southwark.
- October – Central Criminal Lunatic Asylum for Ireland opened in Dundrum, Dublin, the first secure hospital in Europe.
- 17 October – James Young patents a method of distilling paraffin from coal, laying the foundations for the Scottish paraffin industry.
- 22–23 October – The first Wenlock Olympian Class Games held at Much Wenlock, Shropshire.
- November
  - Undergraduates at Exeter College, Oxford arrange a "foot grind" (a cross-country steeplechase), the first organised university athletic event in Britain.
  - Salford Museum and Art Gallery first opens as "The Royal Museum & Public Library", the first unconditionally free public library in England, established under the Museums Act 1845.
- 19 November – Alfred Tennyson appointed as Poet Laureate.
- 25 November – Gale in the English Channel.
- 10 December – Bingley Hall, the world's first purpose-built permanent exhibition hall, opens in Birmingham.
- 17 December – The Inman Line (Liverpool and Philadelphia Steamship Company) begins operations when new iron paddle steamer SS City of Glasgow puts out from Liverpool bound for Philadelphia.

=== Undated ===
- Public Libraries Act, Interpretation Act, Police of Scotland Act and Factory Act passed by parliament.
- The University of Oxford establishes an Honour School (i.e. an undergraduate course) in Natural Science.
- London butchers C Lidgate opens for the first time.
- The 1846–1860 cholera pandemic claims 52,000 lives in England and Wales between 1848 and 1850.

== Publications ==
- Elizabeth Barrett Browning's collection Sonnets from the Portuguese containing the well-known poem which begins "How do I love thee? Let me count the ways."
- Charles Dickens' novel David Copperfield complete in book form.
- Alfred Tennyson's poem In Memoriam A.H.H.
- William Wordsworth's poem The Prelude; or, Growth of a Poet's Mind (posthumously).
- The Germ, periodical of the Pre-Raphaelite Brotherhood edited by William Michael Rossetti (four issues, January–April, the last two retitled Art and Poetry).

== Births ==
- 4 January – Frederick York Powell, historian and scholar (died 1904)
- 15 January – Leonard Darwin, son of the naturalist Charles Darwin (died 1943)
- 19 January – Augustine Birrell, author and politician (died 1933)
- 27 January – John Collier, writer and painter (died 1934)
- 27 January – Edward Smith, Captain of the Titanic (died 1912)
- 29 January – Ebenezer Howard, urban planner (died 1928)
- 18 February – George Henschel, musician (died 1934)
- 9 March – Hamo Thornycroft, sculptor (died 1925)
- 9 April – Julius Wernher, German-born British businessman and art collector (died 1912)
- 13 April – Arthur Matthew Weld Downing, astronomer (died 1917)
- 16 April – Sidney Gilchrist Thomas, inventor (died 1885)
- 26 April – Harry Bates, sculptor (died 1899)
- 1 May – Prince Arthur, Duke of Connaught and Strathearn, member of the Royal Family (died 1942)
- 10 May – Thomas Lipton, merchant and yachtsman (died 1931)
- 12 May – Charles McLaren, 1st Baron Aberconway, Liberal politician and jurist (died 1934)
- 18 May – Oliver Heaviside, engineer (died 1925)
- 26 May – James Kenyon, pioneer of cinematography (died 1925)
- 28 May – Frederic William Maitland, jurist and historian (died 1906)
- 2 June – Jesse Boot, 1st Baron Trent, businessman (died 1931)
- 24 June – Horatio Kitchener, 1st Earl Kitchener, field marshal and statesman (died 1916)
- 13 August – Philip Bourke Marston, poet (died 1887)
- 14 August – W. W. Rouse Ball, mathematician (died 1925)
- 9 September – Jane Ellen Harrison, classical scholar and feminist (died 1928)
- 17 September – Cuthbert Arthur Brereton, civil engineer (died 1910)
- 18 October – Basil Hall Chamberlain, Japanologist (died 1935)
- 24 October – Mary Paley Marshall, economist (died 1944)
- 13 November
  - Robert Louis Stevenson, writer (died 1894)
  - Sir John Benn, 1st Baronet, politician (died 1922)
- 11 December – Lady Mary Victoria Hamilton, Scottish-German-French great-grandmother of Prince Rainier III of Monaco (died 1922)
- 24 December – Brandon Thomas, actor and playwright (died 1914)

== Deaths ==
- 26 January – Francis Jeffrey, Lord Jeffrey, judge and literary critic (born 1773)
- 14 February – Sir Gordon Bremer, naval officer (born 1786)
- 13 March – Owen Stanley, naval officer and explorer of New Guinea (born 1811)
- 7 April – William Lisle Bowles, poet and critic (born 1762)
- 9 April – William Prout, chemist and physician (born 1785)
- 23 April – William Wordsworth, poet (born 1770)
- 24 May – Jane Porter, novelist (born 1776)
- 9 June – John Green Crosse, surgeon (born 1790)
- 2 July – Sir Robert Peel, Prime Minister of the United Kingdom (born 1788)
- 4 July – William Kirby, entomologist (born 1759)
- 7 July – Timothy Hackworth, steam locomotive engineer (born 1786)
- 8 July – Prince Adolphus, Duke of Cambridge, member of the Royal Family (born 1774)
- 12 July – Robert Stevenson, Scottish lighthouse engineer (born 1772)
- 5 August – Mary Anne Whitby, scientist (born 1783)
- 26 August – Louis Philippe I, exiled King of the French (born 1773 in France)
- 27 August – Thomas Kidd, classical scholar and schoolmaster (born 1770)
- 2 September – Charles Williams-Wynn, Tory politician (born 1775)
- 2 October – Sarah Biffen, armless painter (born 1784)
- 1 December – Aaron Manby, ironmaster and civil engineer (born 1776)
- 3 December – John Gibb, Scottish civil engineering contractor (born 1776)
- 4 December
  - Robert Gilfillan, poet (born 1798)
  - William Sturgeon, physicist and inventor (born 1783)
