= 1865 in the United Kingdom =

Events from the year 1865 in the United Kingdom.

== Incumbents ==
- Monarch – Victoria
- Prime Minister – Henry John Temple, 3rd Viscount Palmerston (Liberal) (until 18 October); John Russell, 1st Earl Russell (Liberal) (starting 29 October)

== Events ==
- 3 March – Hong Kong and Shanghai Banking Corporation, founded by Scottish businessman Thomas Sutherland, begins operation in British Hong Kong.
- 4 April – official opening of Crossness Pumping Station, a major landmark in completion of the new London sewerage system designed by Joseph Bazalgette for the Metropolitan Board of Works.
- 28 May – the Mimosa sets sail, carrying Welsh emigrants to Patagonia.
- May – national outbreak of rinderpest in British cattle first appears in Islington; it continues until September 1867.
- June–August – Francis Galton formulates eugenics.
- 4 June – the lyrics of the hymn "Onward, Christian Soldiers", written by Sabine Baring-Gould as "Hymn for Procession with Cross and Banners", are first sung by children processing to St Peter's Church, Horbury, in the West Riding of Yorkshire.
- 7 June – Rednal rail crash in Shropshire: 13 killed, 30 injured.
- 9 June – Staplehurst rail crash in Kent: 10 killed, 49 injured; Charles Dickens is amongst the survivors.
- 25 June – James Hudson Taylor founds the China Inland Mission at Brighton.
- 26 June – Jumbo, a young male African elephant, arrives at London Zoo and becomes a popular attraction.
- 29 June – new Poor Law Act improves conditions in workhouses.
- 2 July – the Christian Mission, later renamed The Salvation Army, is founded in Whitechapel, London by William and Catherine Booth.
- 4 July – Lewis Carroll's children's book Alice's Adventures in Wonderland is published by Macmillan in London for Daresbury-born Oxford don Charles Lutwidge Dodgson (Carroll), three years after it was first narrated to Alice Liddell and her sisters. He and his illustrator, John Tenniel, withdraw this edition from UK distribution and the first trade editions are published on 26 November and released in December (dated 1866).
- 5 July
  - Speed limit in Britain originally introduced by the Locomotive Act 1861 is reduced by the Locomotives Act 1865 – becoming 2 mph in town and 4 mph in the country.
  - Legal case of St Helen's Smelting Co v Tipping decided in the House of Lords: a landowner is entitled to recover damages for harm done to his trees by fumes from a copper smelter.
- 14 July – a party led by Edward Whymper makes the first ascent of the Matterhorn.
- 23 July – the SS Great Eastern departs on a voyage to lay a transatlantic telegraph cable.
- 11–24 July – general election won by the Liberal Party led by Lord Palmerston.
- September – John Henry Walsh (writing as 'Stonehenge' in the magazine The Field) gives the first definition of a dog breed standard (for the pointer) based on physical form.
- 13 September – Gladiateur completes the English Triple Crown by finishing first in the 2,000 Guineas, Epsom Derby and St Leger.
- 28 September – Elizabeth Garrett Anderson becomes the first woman openly to qualify as a doctor in the UK, by licence from the Society of Apothecaries in London (which immediately amends its regulations in a way that prevents other women from following her example). By the end of the year, she establishes her own medical practice in the West End of London.
- 11 October – Morant Bay rebellion: An unsuccessful uprising against British rule at Morant Bay, Jamaica, is brutally suppressed with 400 rebels executed.
- 29 October – Lord John Russell becomes Prime Minister following the death of Lord Palmerston on 18 October.
- 6 November – American Civil War: Surrender to HMS Donegal at Liverpool of the Confederate commerce raider CSS Shenandoah.
- 11 November – Duar War with Bhutan ends with the Treaty of Sinchula, in which Bhutan cedes control of its southern passes to Britain in return for an annual subsidy.
- 16 December – Edward John Eyre, governor of Jamaica, is dismissed and censured for his excessive actions during the suppression of the recent rebellion.

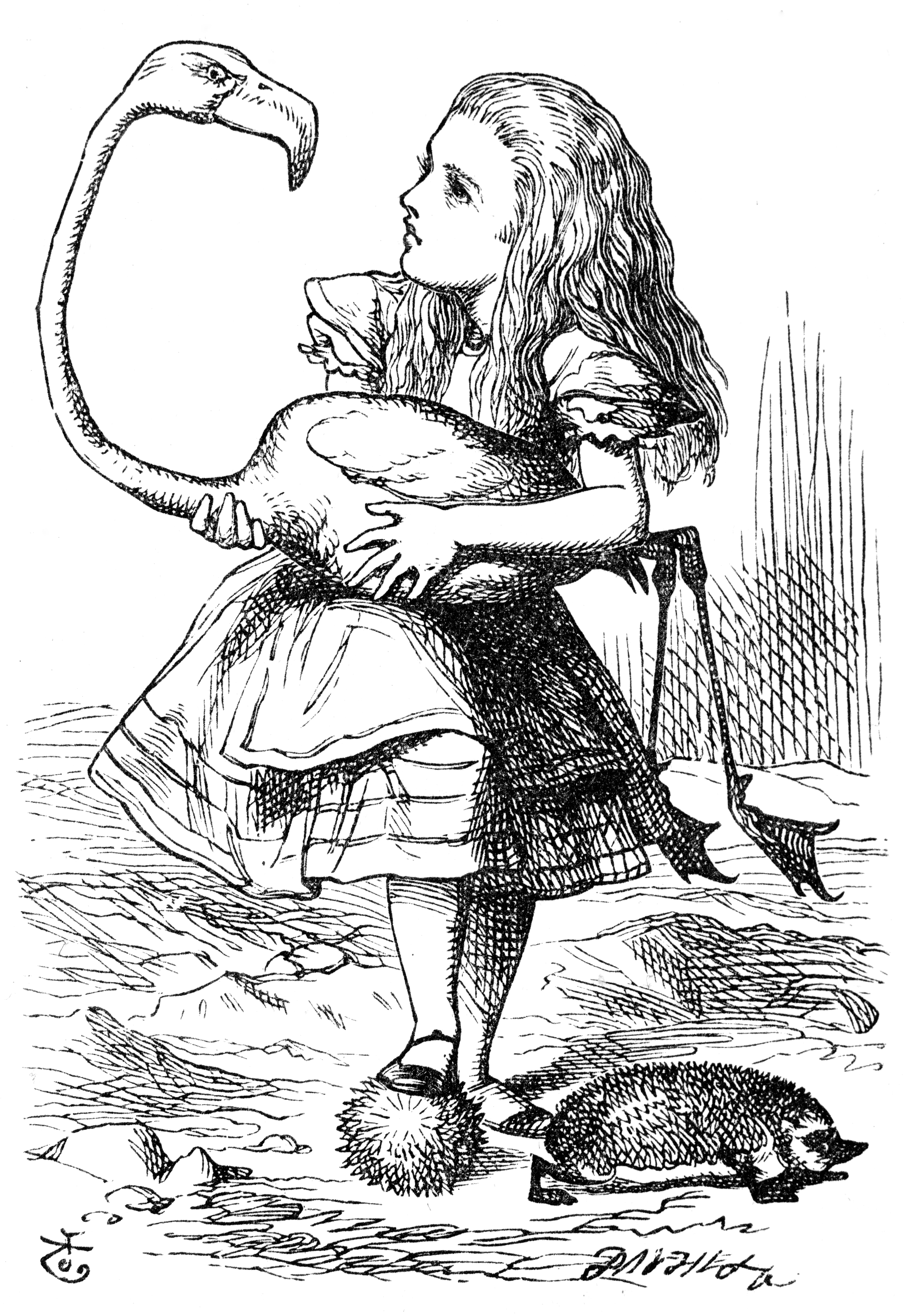
Illustration by John Tenniel to Alice's Adventures in Wonderland

=== Undated ===
- James Clerk Maxwell publishes A Dynamical Theory of the Electromagnetic Field.
- Joseph Lister begins to experiment with antiseptic surgery in Glasgow using carbolic acid.
- Fisherman's Friend menthol remedy developed by pharmacist James Lofthouse of Fleetwood.
- Aveling and Porter produce the world's first steam roller at Rochester, Kent.
- Nottingham Forest F.C. is founded, playing its first match in 1866.

== Publications ==
- Lewis Carroll's novel Alice's Adventures in Wonderland.
- Charles Dickens' novel Our Mutual Friend (publication concludes).
- Robert Smith Surtees' novel Mr. Facey Romford's Hounds (posthumous).
- A. C. Swinburne's narrative poem Atalanta in Calydon.
- Anthony Trollope's novel Can You Forgive Her? (publication concludes).

== Births ==
- 23 January – Connie Gilchrist, Countess of Orkney, child actress and model (died 1946)
- 9 April – Violet Nicolson ('Laurence Hope'), poet (suicide 1904)
- 2 June – George Lohmann, cricketer (died 1901)
- 3 June – King George V (died 1936)
- 15 July – Alfred Harmsworth, 1st Viscount Northcliffe, newspaper and publishing magnate (died 1922)
- 15 August – Louisa Aldrich-Blake, surgeon (died 1925)
- 26 August – Arthur James Arnot, Scottish-Australian electrical engineer, inventor (d. 1946)
- 12 October – Arthur Harden, chemist, Nobel Prize laureate (died 1940)
- 20 October – Sir Rhys Rhys-Williams, 1st Baronet, judge (died 1955)
- 27 October – Tinsley Lindley, footballer (died 1940)
- 4 December – Edith Cavell, nurse (executed 1915)
- 30 December – Rudyard Kipling, writer, Nobel Prize laureate (died 1936)

== Deaths ==
- 8 January – John Dobson, architect (born 1787)
- 6 February – Mrs Isabella Beeton, writer on household management and cookery (born 1836)
- 11 March – Sir Robert Hermann Schomburgk, explorer (born 1804 in Freiburg)
- 2 April – John Cassell, publisher and entrepreneur (born 1817)
- 30 April – Robert FitzRoy, meteorologist and admiral (born 1805; suicide)
- 27 May – Charles Waterton, naturalist and explorer (born 1782)
- 8 June – Sir Joseph Paxton, gardener and architect (born 1803)
- 25 July – Dr James Barry, military surgeon, revealed on death to be a woman, probably Margaret Ann Bulkley (born 1789–1799)
- 28 July – William Henry Smith, businessman (born 1792)
- 12 August – Sir William Hooker, botanist (born 1785)
- 24 August – Charles Baillie-Hamilton, politician (born 1800)
- 8 September – William Henry Smyth, astronomer and admiral (born 1788)
- 18 October – Henry John Temple, 3rd Viscount Palmerston, Prime Minister (born 1784)
- 19 October – William King, physician and philanthropist (born 1786)
- 1 November – John Lindley, botanist (born 1799)
- 8 November – Tom Sayers, boxer (born 1826)
- 12 November – Mrs Elizabeth Gaskell, novelist and biographer (born 1810)
- 16 November – Sir Horatio Thomas Austin, naval officer and explorer (born 1800)
- 24 December – Sir Charles Eastlake, painter (born 1793)
