= 1779 in Scotland =

- Centuries: 16th; 17th; 18th; 19th; 20th
- Decades: 1750s; 1760s; 1770s; 1780s; 1790s
- See also: List of years in Scotland; Timeline of Scottish history 1779 in: Great Britain • Wales • Elsewhere

Events from the year 1779 in Scotland.

== Incumbents ==
=== Law officers ===
- Lord Advocate – Henry Dundas;
- Solicitor General for Scotland – Alexander Murray

=== Judiciary ===
- Lord President of the Court of Session – Lord Arniston, the younger
- Lord Justice General – The Viscount Stormont
- Lord Justice Clerk – Lord Barskimming

== Events ==
- Bowmore distillery on Islay is established.
- Cotton mill at Rothesay, Bute, is established.
- New bridge over River Deveron between Banff and Macduff, designed by John Smeaton, is completed.
- Bridge of Awe is completed.
- David Hume's Dialogues concerning Natural Religion are published posthumously and anonymously.

== Births ==
- 1 May – Alexander Morison, physician and psychiatrist (died 1866)
- 2 May – John Galt, novelist and entrepreneur (died 1839)
- 25 August – Robert Barclay Allardice ("Capt. Barclay"), competitive walker (died 1854)
- 26 October – Henry Cockburn, judge and man of letters (died 1854)
- 20 December – Alexander Walker, physiologist (died 1852)
- 22 December – Ralph Wardlaw, Presbyterian clergyman (died 1853)
- James Barr, composer (died 1860)
- James Marr Brydone, naval surgeon (died 1866 in England)
- Patrick Campbell, army officer and diplomat (died 1857)
- John Douglas, 7th Marquess of Queensberry, Whig politician (died 1856)
- James Forbes, inspector-general of army hospitals (died 1837 in London)
- James Mudie, settler in Australia (died 1852)
- Hugh Murray, geographer (died 1846 in London)

== Deaths ==
- 10 March (bur.) – John Rutherford, physician (born 1695)
- John Dalrymple, political writer (born 1734)

== The arts ==
- George Richardson's Iconology is published.

== See also ==
- Timeline of Scottish history
- 1779 in Great Britain
