= James Forbes =

James or Jim Forbes may refer to:

== Politicians ==
- James Alexander Forbes (1805–1881), British vice-consul to Mexican California and founder of the town of Los Gatos
- James Forbes (statesman) (c. 1731–1780), U.S. statesman, continental congressman for Maryland
- James Fraser Forbes (1820–1887), Canadian member of parliament
- James Randy Forbes (born 1952), U.S. representative from Virginia
- Jim Forbes (Australian politician) (1923–2019), Australian politician

== Sportspeople ==
- James Forbes (basketball) (1952–2022), American basketball player, Olympic silver medalist
- Jim C. Forbes (1908–1981), Australian rules footballer for St Kilda
- Jim Forbes (footballer) (1908–1996), Australian rules footballer for South Melbourne

== Military ==
- James Forbes (hospital inspector) (1779–1837), Scottish inspector-general of army hospitals
- James Forbes, 17th Lord Forbes (1765–1843), Scottish colonel
- James Forbes-Robertson (1884–1955), English recipient of the Victoria Cross for his service in World War I

== Religion ==
- James Forbes (divine) (c. 1629–1712), Scottish nonconformist minister
- James Forbes (minister) (1813–1851), Australian clergyman and educator
- James A. Forbes (born 1935), senior minister of New York's Riverside Church

== Others ==
- James Forbes, 16th Lord Forbes (died 1804), Scottish nobleman
- James Forbes (artist) (1749–1819), British artist
- James Forbes (botanist) (1773–1861), British gardener and botanist
- James Forbes (portrait painter) (1797–1881), Scottish-American portrait painter
- James David Forbes (1809–1868), Scottish physicist
- James Staats Forbes (1823–1904), Scottish railway engineer, railway administrator and art collector
- James Forbes (playwright) (1871–1938), Canadian-American writer
- James Forbes (storekeeper) (1828–1906), early Western Australian settler
- Jim Forbes (journalist) (born 1955), American writer, producer and correspondent
- James Edwin Forbes (1876–1955), British architect
