= 1779 in Great Britain =

Events from the year 1779 in Great Britain.

== Incumbents ==
- Monarch – George III
- Prime Minister – Frederick North, Lord North (Tory)

== Events ==
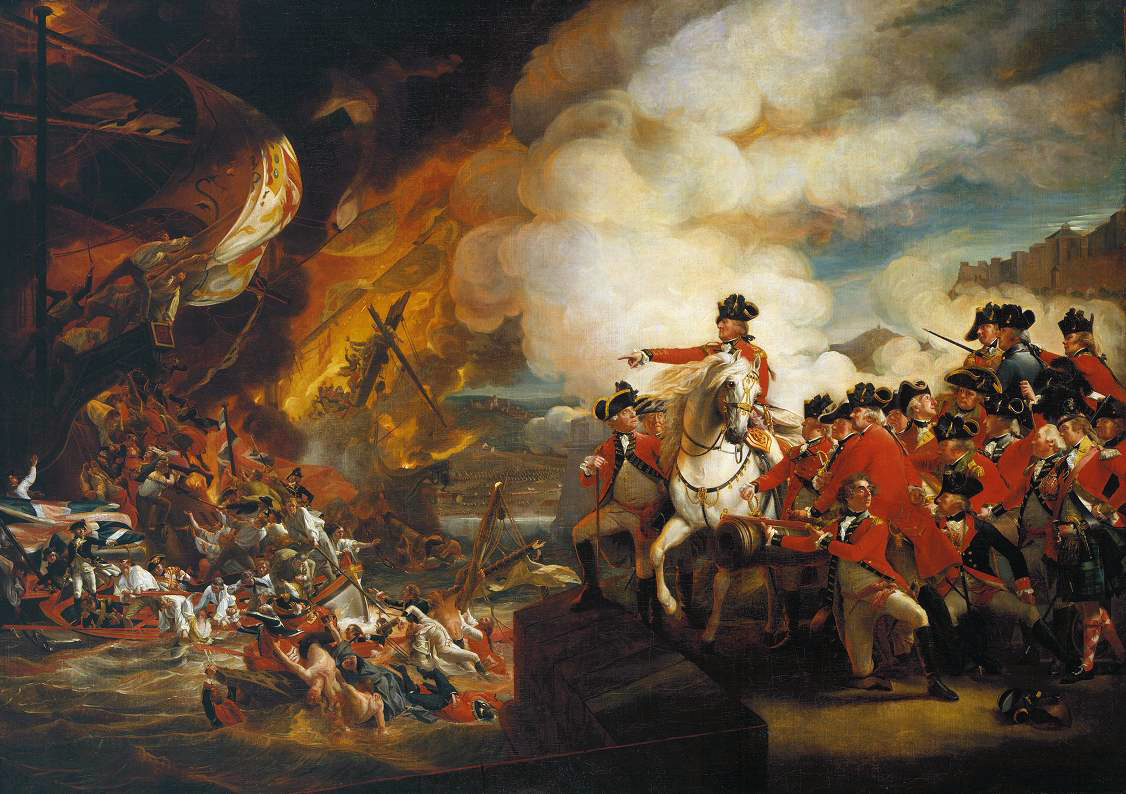
The Defeat of the Floating Batteries at Gibraltar, September 1782, by John Singleton Copley

- 9 January – First Anglo-Maratha War: British troops surrender to the Marathas in Wadgaon, India, and are forced to return all territories acquired since 1773.
- 11 February – Admiral Keppel acquitted of charges of misconduct brought against him by Sir Hugh Palliser.
- 14 February – Captain James Cook dies on the Sandwich Islands on his third and last voyage.
- 23–25 February – American Revolutionary War: Battle of Vincennes – American militia defeat a British garrison.
- 1–28 February – with an average temperature of 7.9 °C (46.2 °F), this is the warmest February in the CET record and the oldest still-standing record-warm month therein.
- 3 March – American Revolutionary War: Battle of Briar Creek – the British rout American forces.
- 23 March – astronomer Edward Pigott discovers the Black Eye Galaxy.
- 29 March (to 12 May 1780): American Revolutionary War – Siege of Charleston by British forces.
- 1 January–31 March – with a total England and Wales Precipitation of only 44.4 millimetres (1.75 in), this is the driest three consecutive months since records began in 1766.
- 12 April – France (at this time in alliance with America) signs a secret treaty with Spain to wage war against Great Britain.
- May – Boulton and Watt's Smethwick Engine, which will become the oldest working engine in the world, is brought into service.
- 14 May – First running of The Oaks horse race.
- 3 June – Armada of 1779: Fleet sets sail from France.
- 16 June – American Revolutionary War: Spain declares war on Britain.
- 20 June – American Revolutionary War: Battle of Stono Ferry – a British rearguard hold off an American assault.
- 24 June – American Revolutionary War: start of the Great Siege of Gibraltar (fourteenth and last military siege). This is an action by French and Spanish forces to wrest control of Gibraltar from the established British Garrison. The garrison, led by George Augustus Eliott, later 1st Baron Heathfield of Gibraltar, survives all attacks and a blockade of supplies.
- 30 June – Parliament passes the Penitentiary Act permitting the creation of state prisons for the first time.
- 6 July – American Revolutionary War: Battle of Grenada fought between British and French navies. British ships are badly damaged but none are lost.
- 15 July – American Revolutionary War: American forces led by General Anthony Wayne capture Stony Point, New York from British troops in the Battle of Stony Point.
- 22 July
  - American Revolutionary War: Goshen Militia destroyed by Mohawk British ally Joseph Brant's forces at the Battle of Minisink.
  - Armada of 1779: French and Spanish ships rendezvous.
- 24 July – American Revolutionary War: the Penobscot Expedition ends in defeat for the Americans.
- 14–18 August; 31 August–3 September – Armada of 1779 in the English Channel, but no fleet action with the Royal Navy takes place.
- September – American Revolutionary War: France captures Saint Vincent and Grenada from the British.
- 7 September – American Revolutionary War: Capture of Fort Bute by Spanish troops.
- 20–21 September – American Revolutionary War: at the Battle of Baton Rouge Spanish forces defeat the British.
- 23 September – American Revolutionary War: Battle of Flamborough Head off the Yorkshire coast – The American ship Bonhomme Richard, commanded by John Paul Jones, engages HMS Serapis (1779). The Bonhomme Richard sinks, but the Americans capture the Serapis and other vessels.
- 18 October – American Revolutionary War: The Americans abandon the Siege of Savannah.
- October
  - First performance of Richard Brinsley Sheridan's play The Critic at the Drury Lane Theatre in London.
  - The Bible Society, predecessor of the Naval, Military and Air Force Bible Society, formed in London.
- 22 December – American Revolutionary War: Capture of Savannah – British forces under Archibald Campbell take the city of Savannah, Georgia.
- 31 December – Affair of Fielding and Bylandt, a brief naval engagement with the Dutch off the Isle of Wight.

=== Undated ===
- Industrial Revolution
  - Spinning Mule invented by Samuel Crompton.
  - The Iron Bridge is erected across the River Severn in Shropshire; the first all cast-iron bridge ever constructed.
- South façade of Stowe House, Buckinghamshire, completed in the neoclassical style based on a design by Robert Adam.
- Robert Adam completes his remodelling of Kenwood House on Hampstead Heath.

== Publications ==
- Olney Hymns by John Newton and William Cowper containing the first printed version of "Amazing Grace".
- Dialogues concerning Natural Religion by David Hume (posthumous and anonymous).

== Births ==
- 1 January – Edward Stanley, Bishop of Norwich (died 1849)
- 18 January – Peter Mark Roget, lexicographer (died 1869)
- 19 January – Jonathan Backhouse, banker and Quaker minister (died 1842)
- 20 February – Augustus Wall Callcott, landscape painter (died 1844)
- 24 February – Robert Gifford, 1st Baron Gifford, lawyer, judge and politician (died 1826)
- 14 March – William Ormsby-Gore, politician (died 1860)
- 15 March – William Lamb, 2nd Viscount Melbourne, Prime Minister of the United Kingdom (died 1848)
- 2 May – John Galt, novelist (died 1839)
- 13 July – William Hedley, inventor and locomotive engineer (died 1843)
- 31 December – Horace Smith, author (died 1849)

== Deaths ==
- 20 January – David Garrick, actor (born 1717)
- 22 January – Jeremiah Dixon, surveyor and astronomer (born 1733)
- 4 February – John Hamilton Mortimer, painter (born 1740)
- 7 February – William Boyce, composer (born 1711)
- 14 February – James Cook, naval captain and explorer (born 1728)
- 1 May - Sarah Clayton, industrialist (born 1712)
- 7 June – William Warburton, critic and Bishop of Gloucester (born 1698)
- 10 July – Jane Gomeldon, née Middleton, feminist writer, poet and adventurer (born c. 1720)
- 12 September – Richard Grenville-Temple, 2nd Earl Temple, politician (born 1711)
- 8 December – Nathan Alcock, physician (born 1707)
- 11 December – Bridget Bevan, philanthropist (born 1698)
- 23 December – Augustus Hervey, 3rd Earl of Bristol, admiral and politician (born 1724)
- date unknown – John Dalrymple, Scottish political writer (born 1734)

== See also ==
- 1779 in Wales
