= Richard Dadd =

British painter (1817–1886)

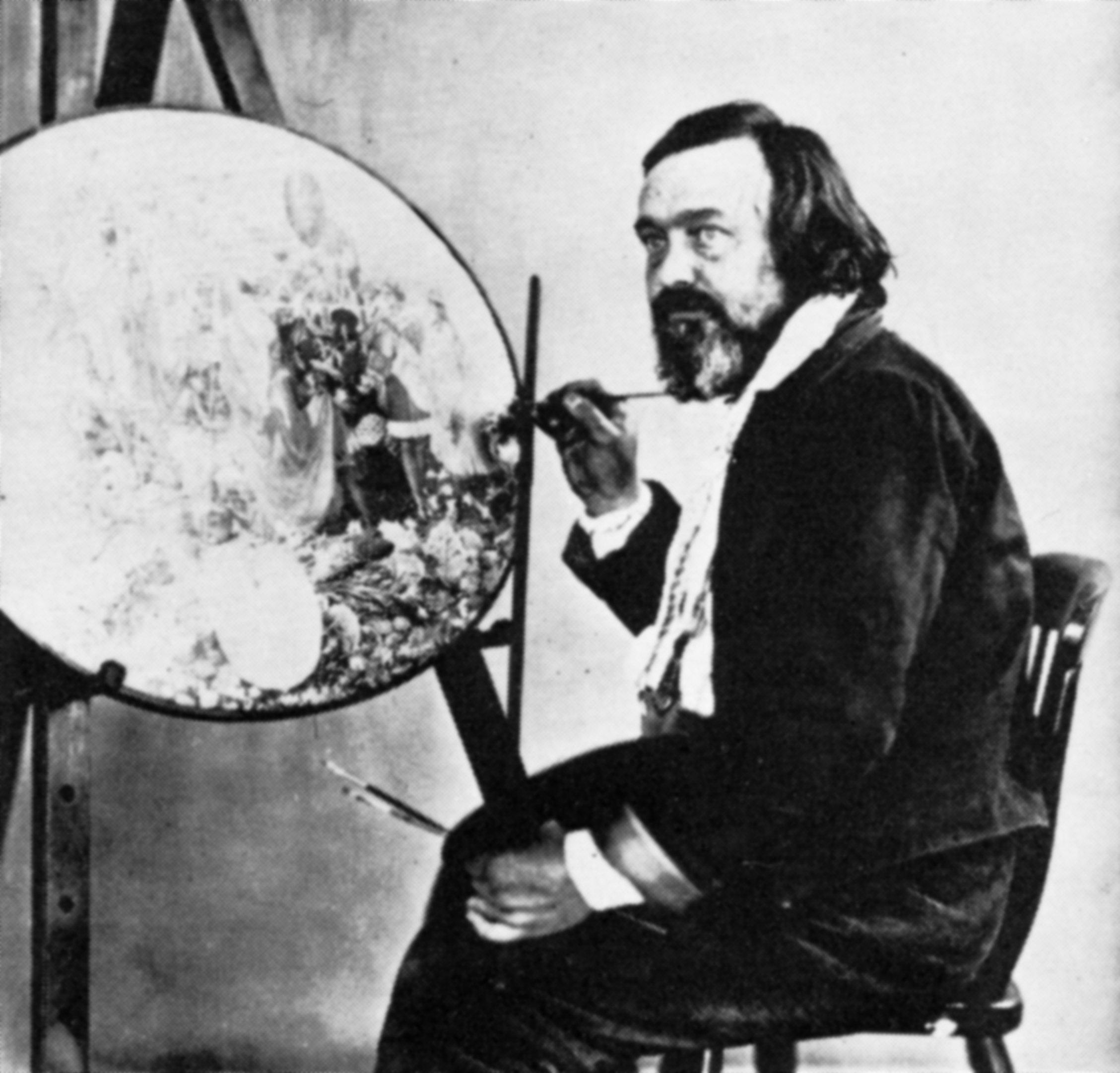
- Dadd working on Contradiction: Oberon and Titania (1854/1858). Photograph by Henry Hering.
- Born: 1 August 1817; Chatham, Kent, England
- Died: 7 January 1886 (aged 68); Broadmoor Hospital, Berkshire, England
- Education: Royal Academy Art Schools; William Dadson's Academy of Art
- Occupation: Artist

Richard Dadd (1 August 1817 – 7 January 1886) was an English painter of the Victorian era, noted for his depictions of fairies and other supernatural subjects, Orientalist scenes, and enigmatic genre scenes, rendered with obsessively minuscule detail. Most of the works for which he is best known were created while he was a patient in Bethlem and Broadmoor hospitals.

== Early life ==
Dadd was born at Chatham, Kent, on 1 August 1817, the son of chemist Robert Dadd (1788/9–1843) and Mary Ann (1790–1824), daughter of the shipwright Richard Martin. He was educated at King's School, Rochester, where his aptitude for drawing was evident at an early age, leading to his admission to the Royal Academy Art Schools at the age of 20. He was awarded the medal for life drawing in 1840. With William Powell Frith, Augustus Egg, Henry O'Neil and others, he founded The Clique, of which he was generally considered to be the leading talent. He was also trained at William Dadson's Academy of Art.

== Career ==
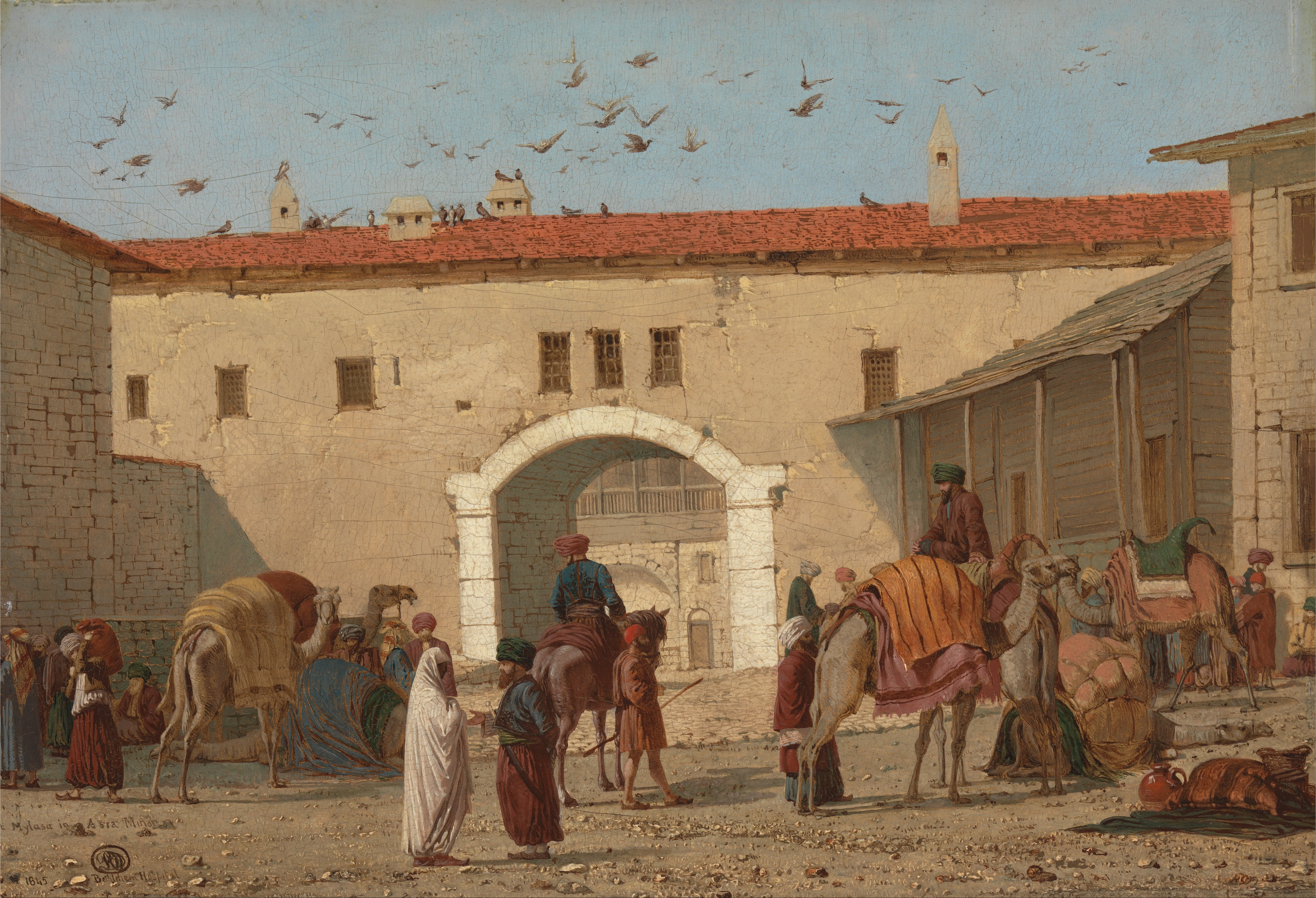
Caravanserai at Mylasa in Asia Minor (1845)

Among his best-known early works are the illustrations he produced for The Book of British Ballads (1842), and a frontispiece he designed for The Kentish Coronal (1840).

In July 1842, Sir Thomas Phillips, the former mayor of Newport, chose Dadd to accompany him as his draughtsman on an expedition through Europe to Greece, Turkey, Southern Syria and finally Egypt. In November of that year they spent a gruelling two weeks in Southern Syria, passing from Jerusalem to Jordan and returning across the Ein Gedi wilderness. Toward the end of December, while travelling up the Nile by boat, the 25-year-old Dadd underwent a dramatic personality change, becoming delusional, increasingly violent, and believing himself to be under the influence of the Egyptian god Osiris. His condition was initially thought to be sunstroke.

=== Mental illness and hospitalization ===
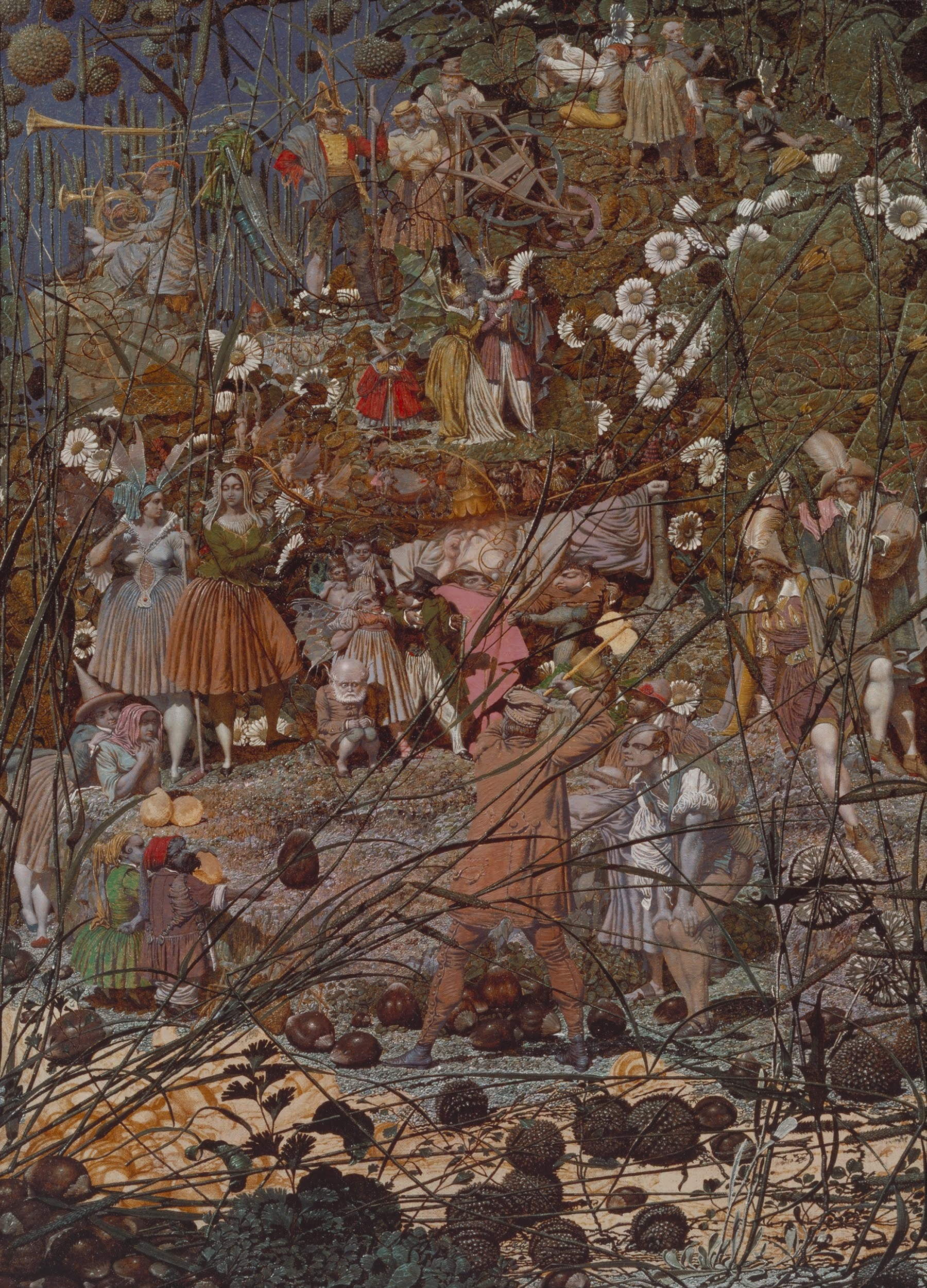
The Fairy Feller's Master-Stroke, oil on canvas, 26 in × 21 in (660 mm × 530 mm) (1855–64)

On his return to England in May 1843, Dadd was diagnosed to be of unsound mind and was taken by his family to recuperate in the rural village of Cobham, Kent. In August of that year, having become convinced that his father was the Devil in disguise, Dadd killed him with a knife and fled to France. En route to Paris, Dadd attempted to kill a fellow passenger with a razor but was overpowered and arrested by police. Dadd confessed to killing his father and was returned to England, where he was committed to the criminal department of Bethlem psychiatric hospital (also known as Bedlam). There and subsequently at the newly created Broadmoor Hospital, Dadd was cared for in an enlightened manner by Doctors William Wood, William Orange and Sir William Charles Hood.

Dadd probably had paranoid schizophrenia. Two of his siblings had the condition, while a third had "a private attendant" for unknown reasons.

In hospital, Dadd was encouraged to continue painting, and in 1852 he created a portrait of one of his doctors, Alexander Morison, which now hangs in the Scottish National Portrait Gallery. Dadd painted many of his best pictures in Bethlem and Broadmoor, including The Fairy Feller's Master-Stroke, which he worked on between 1855 and 1864. Dadd was pictured at work on his Contradiction: Oberon and Titania by the London society photographer Henry Hering. Also dating from the 1850s are the 33 watercolour drawings titled Sketches to Illustrate the Passions, which include Grief or Sorrow, Love, and Jealousy, as well as Agony-Raving Madness and Murder. Like most of his works, these are executed on a small scale and feature protagonists whose eyes are fixed in a peculiar, unfocused stare. Dadd also produced many shipping scenes and landscapes during his hospitalization, such as the ethereal 1861 watercolour Port Stragglin. These are executed with a miniaturist's eye for detail, which belies the fact that they are products of imagination and memory.

== Death ==
After 20 years at Bethlem, Dadd was moved to Broadmoor Hospital, a newly built high-security facility in Berkshire. There he remained for the remainder of his life, painting constantly and receiving infrequent visitors; he died on 7 January 1886, "from an extensive disease of the lungs". He was buried in an unmarked grave at Broadmoor Hospital Cemetery. A "substantial number" of his works are on display in the Bethlem Royal Hospital Museum.

== Legacy ==
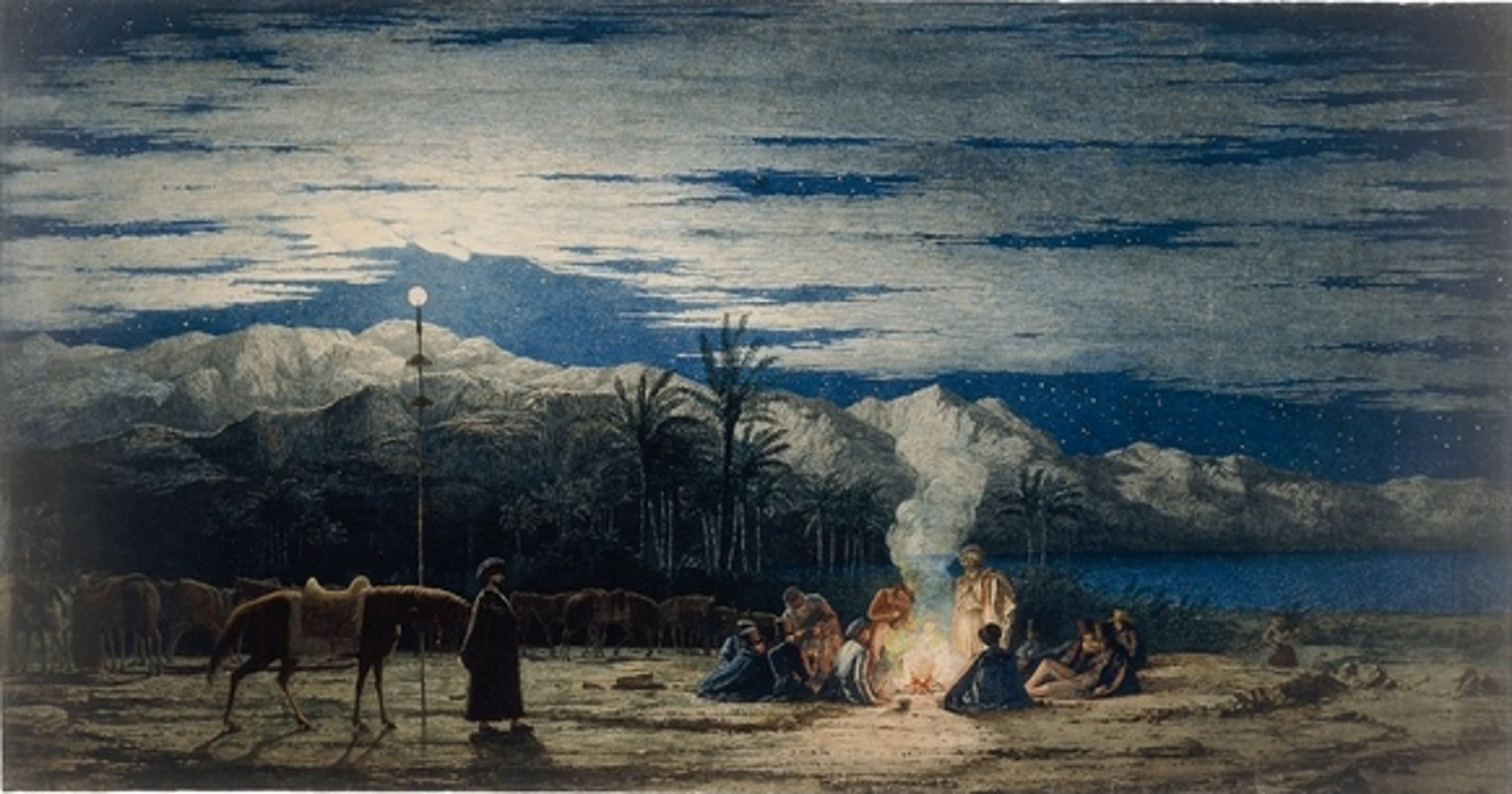
The Halt in the Desert, 1845

Freddie Mercury was inspired to write the song "The Fairy Feller's Master-Stroke" based on Dadd's painting, which he had seen at the Tate Gallery. In 2013, Neil Gaiman wrote an essay about the painting for the magazine Intelligent Life (now called 1843).

Angela Carter wrote Come unto these Yellow Sands, a radio-play based on Dadd's life, first broadcast in 1979.

Canadian author R. J. Anderson acknowledges Dadd as the basis of her fictional painter Alfred Wrenfield, who figures prominently in her young adult fantasy novel Knife (2009).

In 1987, a long-lost watercolour by Dadd, The Artist's Halt in the Desert, was discovered by Peter Nahum on the BBC TV programme Antiques Roadshow. Made while the artist was incarcerated, it is based on sketches made during his tour of the Middle East, and shows his party encamped by the Dead Sea, with Dadd at the far right. It was later sold for £100,000 to the British Museum.

Loreena McKennitt features Dadd's 1862 painting "Bacchanalian Scene" on the cover of her 1987 Christmas CD To Drive the Cold Winter Away.

Terry Pratchett included The Fairy Feller's Master-Stroke in his 2003 Discworld novel The Wee Free Men. Tiffany, the protagonist, finds it in a book of fairy-tales and later escapes from a dream set within the picture. In the author's note, Pratchett describes the painting and gives a brief but sympathetic summary of Dadd's personal history and struggle with mental illness.

In 2026, Richard Dadd was given a dedicated show at the Royal Academy: Richard Dadd - Beyond Bedlam, containing more than 100 works, including his famous fairy paintings and pieces created during his 42 years in psychiatric confinement.

== Gallery ==
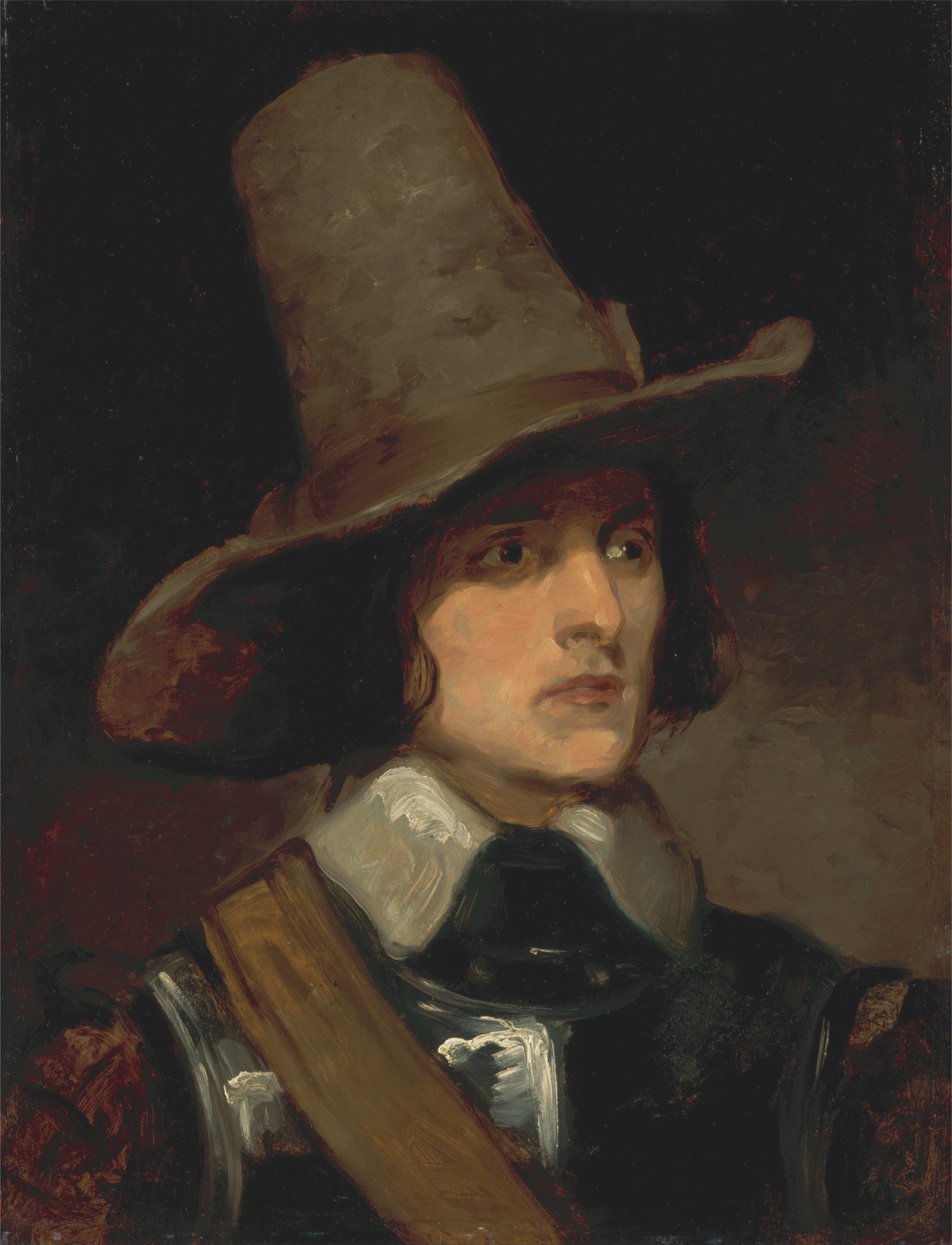
Augustus Egg, between 1838 and 1840

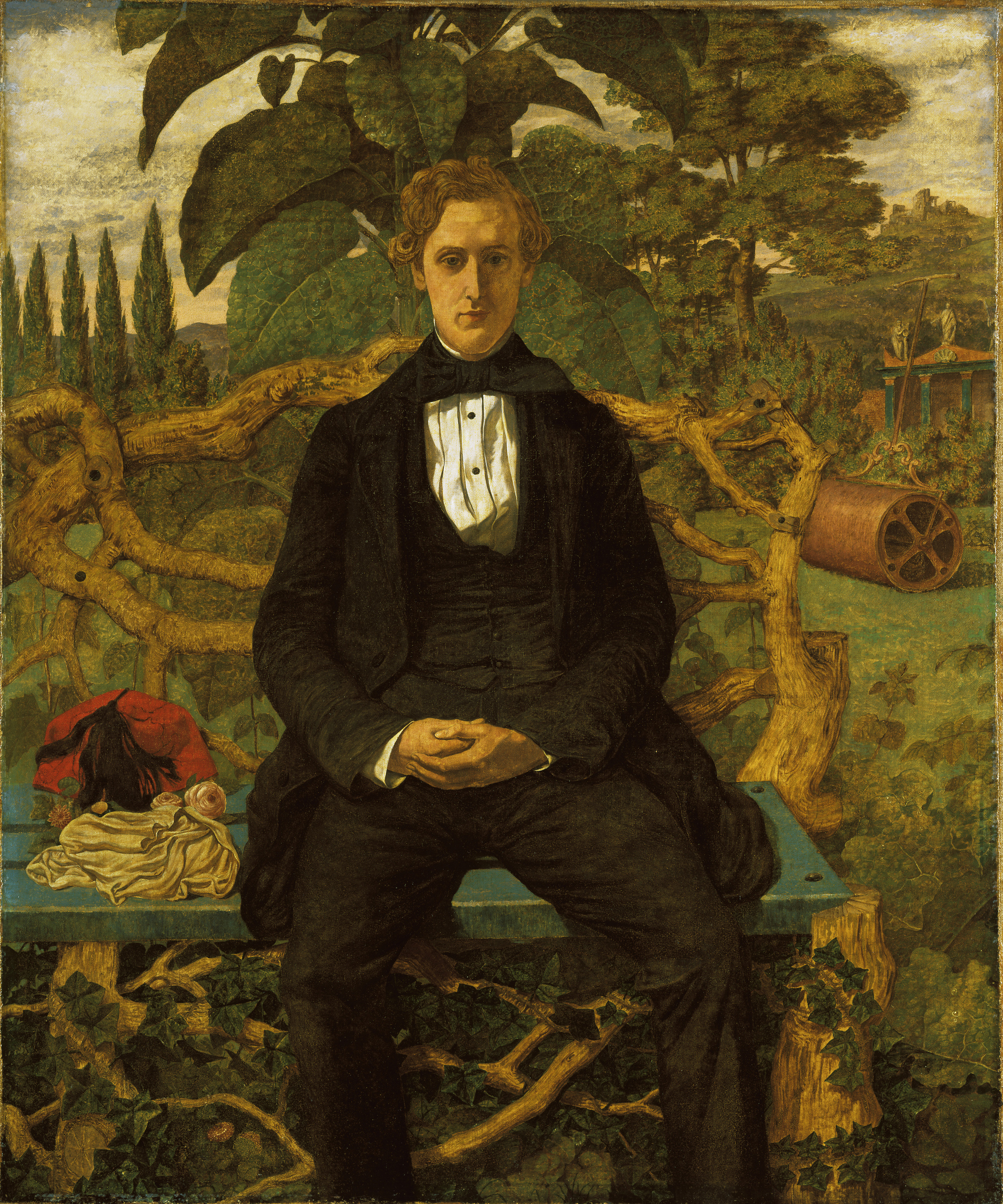
Portrait of a Young Man, 1853

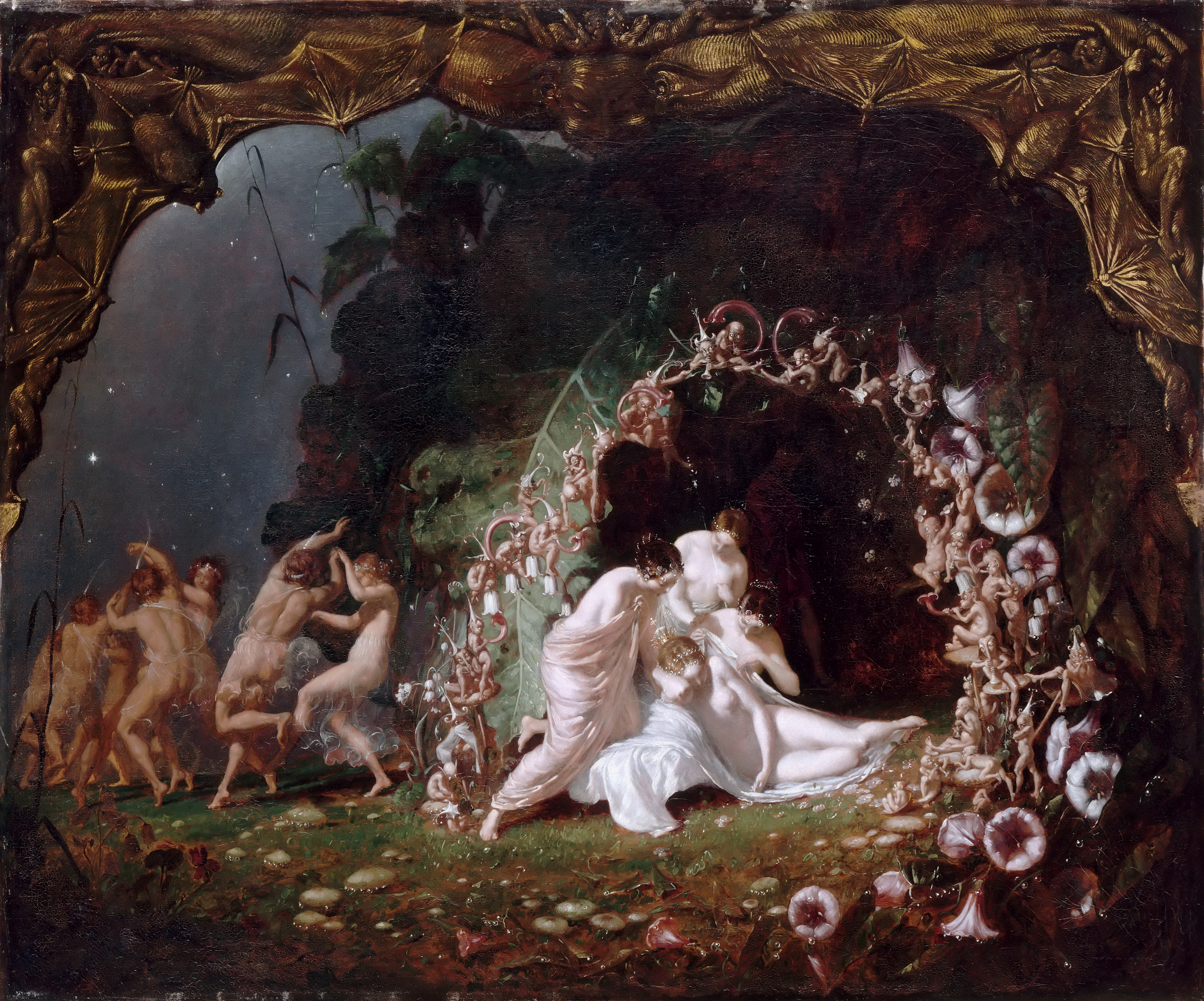
Titania Sleeping, 1841

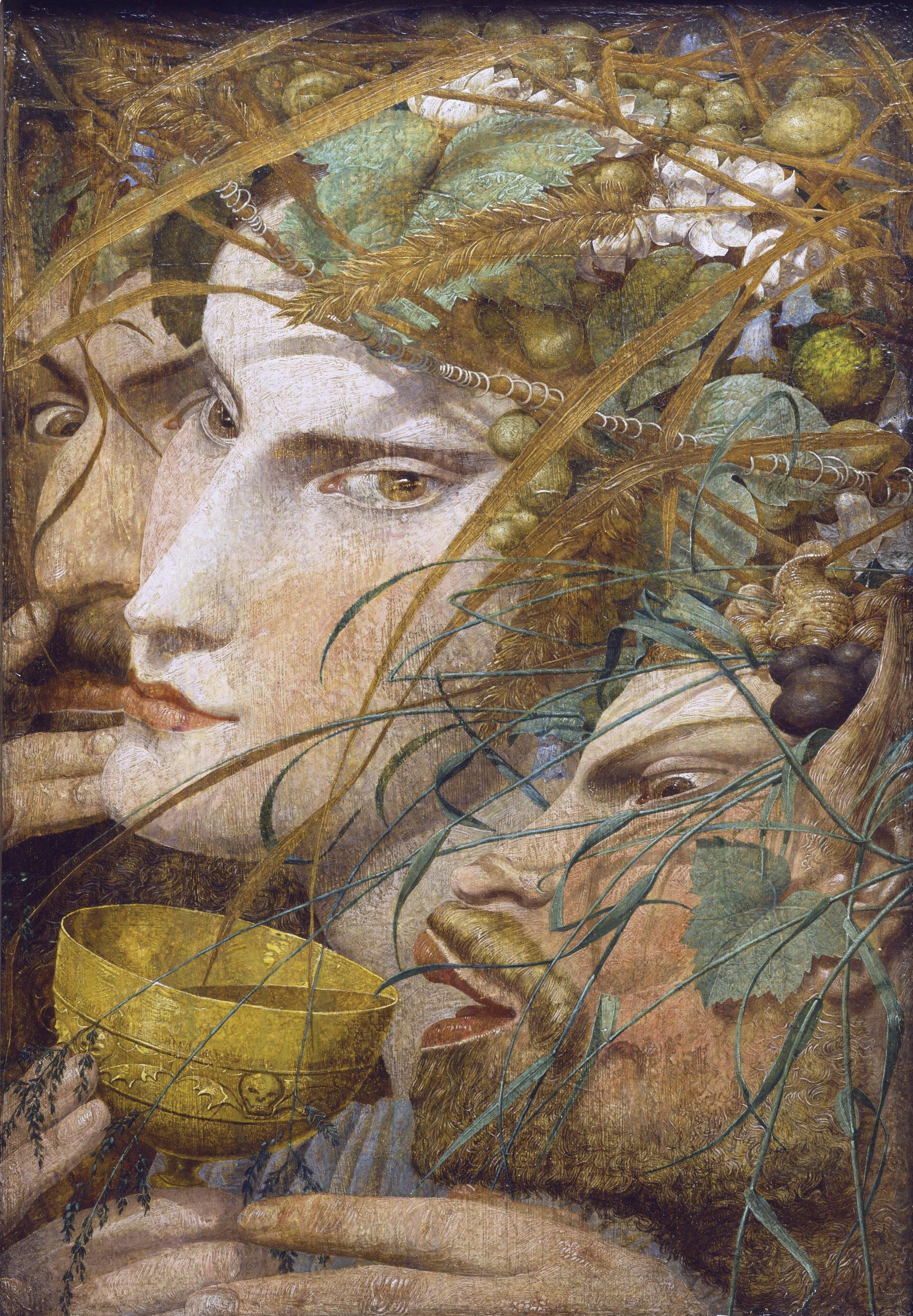
Bacchanalian Scene, 1862

== See also ==
- Fairy painting
- List of Orientalist artists
