= Jasmine Becket-Griffith =

American artist

- Born: June 4, 1979 (age 46)
- Known for: Freelance artist
- Style: Fairy, fantasy, and gothic artwork
- Website: strangeling.com

Jasmine Becket-Griffith (born June 4, 1979) is a freelance artist who specializes in fairy, fantasy, and gothic artwork. Her preferred medium is acrylic paints on wood and her designs appear on many lines of licensed merchandise and publications, notably through the chain stores Hot Topic and collectibles through the Bradford Group including co-branded Disney projects. She is also a staple at fantasy and pop culture conventions such as LA ComicCon, CatCon, and GenCon.

Since 2006, Jasmine began doing freelance co-branded artwork with the Walt Disney Company as an independent contractor.

Jasmine's physical galleries for her artwork are at Disney Springs in the Walt Disney World Resort, the Dark Art Emporium in Long Beach, and the Corey Helford Gallery in Los Angeles. Her licensed Disney character artwork can be found at Disneyland's WonderGround Gallery in Anaheim, California as well as throughout the Disney themeparks.

In addition to creating her solo "Strangeling™ " art brand, she is the co-creator of the "Death & the Maiden™ " fine art and comic book universe with her partner, artist David Van Gough.

She lives in California working from studios in Long Beach and Julian.

== Books ==
Her artwork has been published in:

- Fairy: the Art of Jasmine Becket-Griffith
- Jasmine Becket-Griffith: Portfolio Volume I
- The Art of Faery by David Riche
- The World of Faery by David Riche
- Spectrum 11: The Best in Contemporary Fantastic Art
- Spectrum 13: The Best in Contemporary Fantastic Art
- Spectrum 15: The Best in Contemporary Fantastic Art
- Spectrum 17: The Best in Contemporary Fantastic Art
- Spectrum 18: The Best in Contemporary Fantastic Art
- Spectrum 19: The Best in Contemporary Fantastic Art
- Spectrum 20: The Best in Contemporary Fantastic Art
- 500 Fairy Motifs by David Riche
- Gothic Art Now by Jasmine Becket-Griffith and Brom
- Vampire Art Now by Jasmine Becket-Griffith and Matthew David Becket
- Strangeling by Jasmine Becket-Griffith, Amber Logan and Kachina Mickeletto
- Lowbrow Cats by Rakel Velasco
- Beautiful Creatures Tarot by Jay R. Rivera and Jasmine Becket-Griffith
- The Halloween Forever Oracle by Jasmine Becket-Griffith and Tess Whitehurst
