= Fairy painting =

Victorian painting genre and movement

Fairy painting is a genre of painting and illustration featuring fairies and fairy tale settings, often with extreme attention to detail, seen as escapism for Victorians. The genre is most closely associated with Victorian painting in the United Kingdom and has experienced a contemporary revival, led with noted examples by Brian Froud and Alan Lee.

== Origins and influences ==
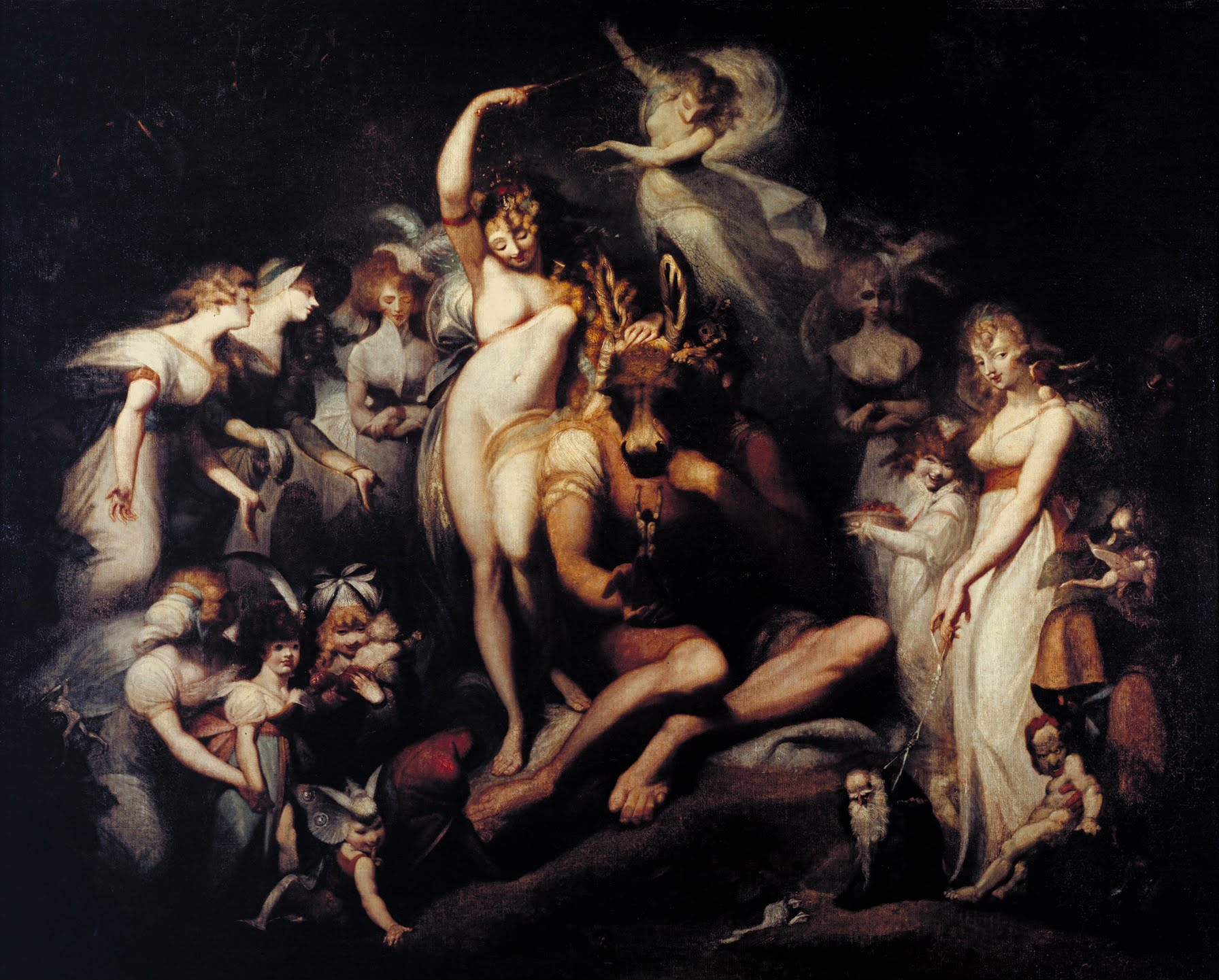
Titania and Bottom. Oil on canvas by Henry Fuseli, c. 1790

Despite its whimsical appearance, fairy painting is strongly rooted in the literary and theatrical influences of Romanticism and the cultural issues facing the Victorian era. Among the most significant of these influences were the fantasy themes of Shakespeare's A Midsummer Night's Dream and The Tempest. Other literary works, such as Edmund Spenser's The Faerie Queene and Alexander Pope's mock-heroic The Rape of the Lock, have been cited as contributing influences as well. Innovations in stage production helped bring these works to the public eye, as the development of gaslight and improvements in wire-work led to increasingly elaborate special effects. Once described by Douglas Jerrold as "a fairy creation that could only be acted by fairies", productions of A Midsummer Night's Dream became more common, eventually leading to an 1863 spectacle featuring Ellen Terry as Titania astride a mechanical mushroom.

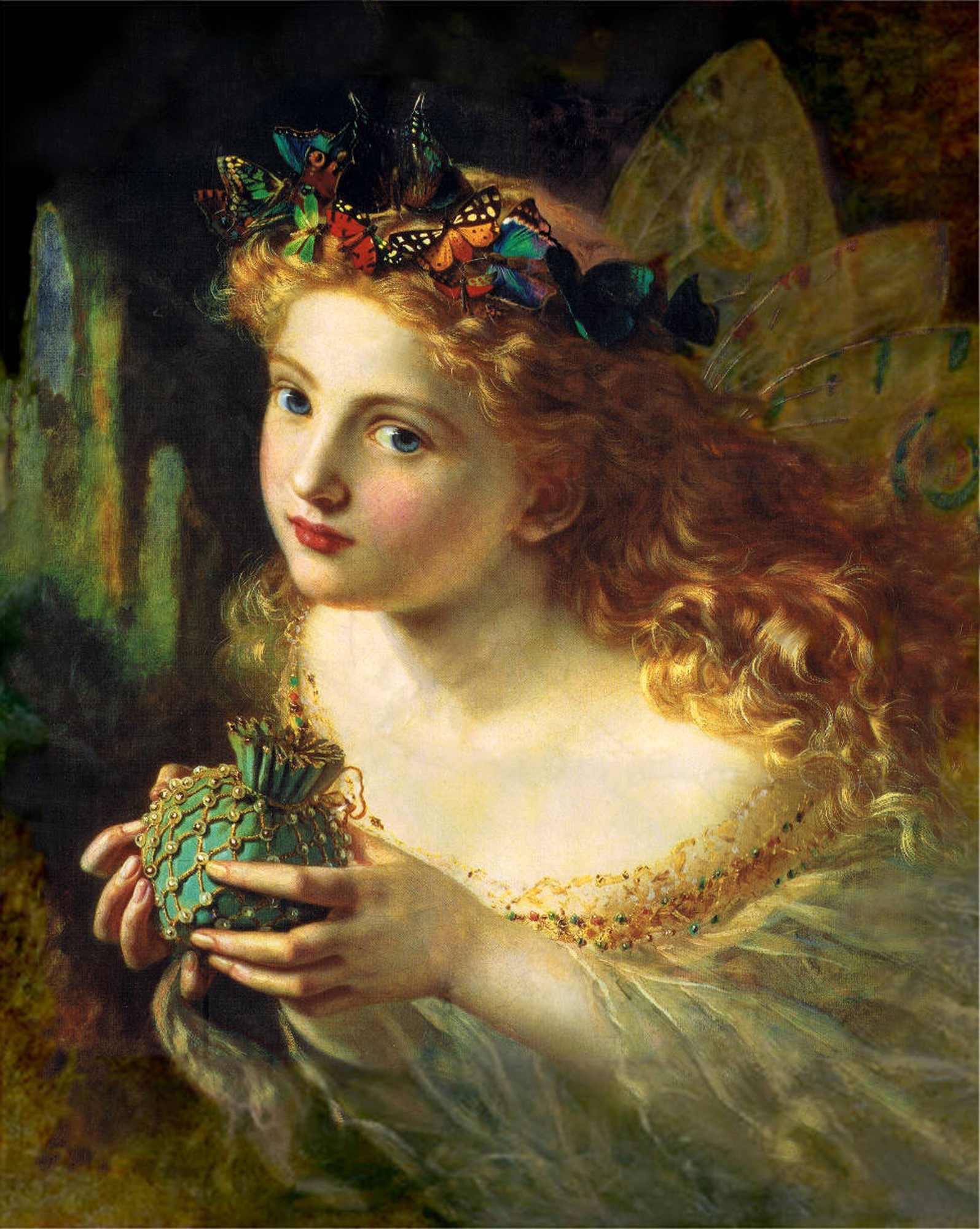
A portrait of a fairy, by Sophie Gengembre Anderson (1869). The title of the painting is Take the Fair Face of Woman, and Gently Suspending, With Butterflies, Flowers, and Jewels Attending, Thus Your Fairy is Made of Most Beautiful Things – from a verse by Charles Ede.

Cultural changes were also an important factor during this period. Continuing industrialization was uprooting longstanding traditions, and rapid advances in science and technology, especially the invention of photography, left some people discomforted and confused. According to Jeremy Maas, the turn to mythological and fantasy elements, and in particular to the fairy's world, allowed an escape from these demands. "No other type of painting concentrates so many of the opposing elements of the Victorian psyche: the desire to escape the drear hardships of daily existence; the stirrings of new attitudes toward sex, stifled by religious dogma; a passion for the unseen; the birth of psychoanalysis; the latent revulsion against the exactitude of the new invention of photography." The significance of fairy paintings as a reaction to cultural change is not universally accepted, however. "Ultimately," Andrew Stuttaford wrote, "these paintings were just about fun."

== Victorian fairy painting ==
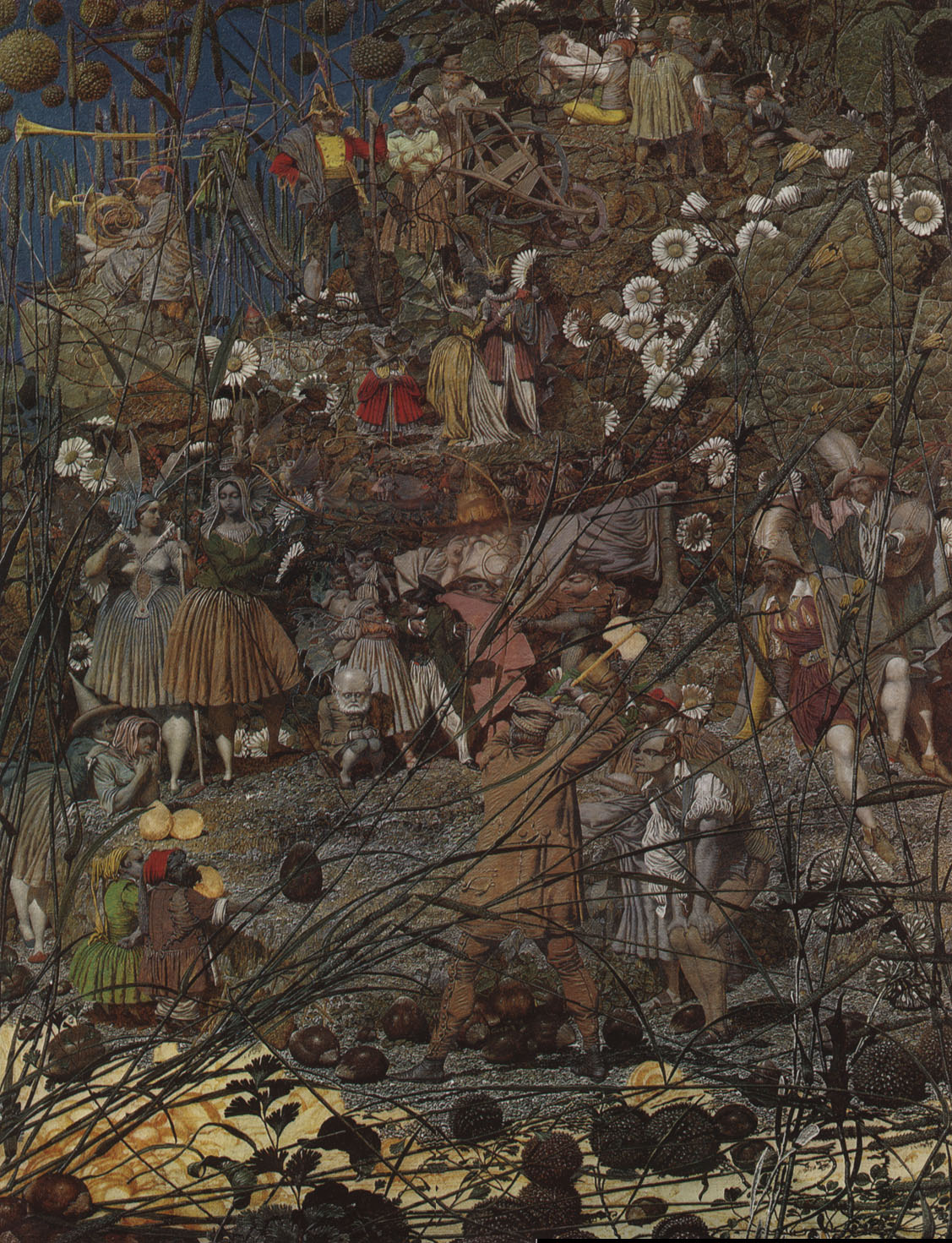
The Fairy Feller's Master-Stroke. Oil on canvas by Richard Dadd 1855–1864.

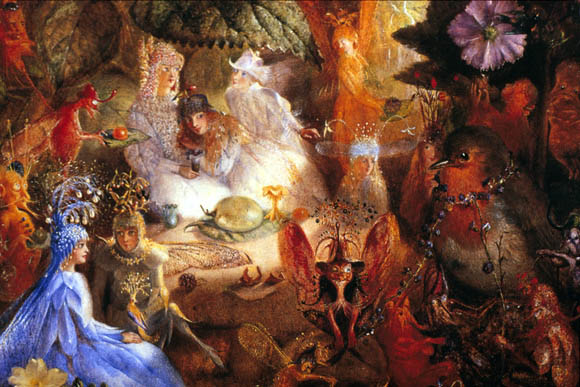
The Captive Robin by John Anster Fitzgerald, c.1864

The earliest artists considered to have contributed to the genre predate much of Romanticism and the Victorian era. Henry Fuseli and William Blake produced works that would be indicative of the later genre even before 1800. The artist most closely associated with fairy painting was outsider artist Richard Dadd, who was suspected to have schizophrenia and produced most of his work while incarcerated in the Bethlem psychiatric hospital for the murder of his father. Despite his status and condition, his fantastic subjects and extraordinarily detailed style were generally well-received, with one period reviewer describing his work as "exquisitely ideal". He accompanied his masterpiece, The Fairy Feller's Master-Stroke, which he painted from 1855 to 1864, with an elaborate poem which provides historical, literary, or mythological context to each of the depicted characters.

Fairy painting was not exclusively the domain of outside art. The work of John Anster Fitzgerald debuted at London's Royal Academy. His work, a series of Christmas-themed fairy illustrations, received wider public visibility in the Illustrated London News. The Scottish artist Joseph Noel Paton exhibited two immensely detailed paintings, The Quarrel of Oberon and Titania and The Reconciliation of Titania and Oberon, based on the popular fairy scenes of A Midsummer Night's Dream. Even Edwin Landseer, sometimes named "Victoria's favourite artist", produced a painting of Titania and Bottom in the genre's style, his Scene from A Midsummer Night's Dream.

The genre also influenced the Pre-Raphaelite Brotherhood and the movement it began. Co-founder John Everett Millais produced a series of fairy paintings based on The Tempest, ending with his 1849 work Ferdinand Lured by Ariel. Dante Gabriel Rossetti, another of the Brotherhood's initial members, took a more sensual approach to the subject, in both painting and poetry. Others involved with the movement, such as Arthur Hughes and William Bell Scott, also contributed to the genre.

The Cottingley Fairies briefly revived interest in fae subjects, before the waning of Romanticism and the advent of World War I reduced interest in the styles and topics popular during the Victorian era. The illustrated fairy-tale books of Arthur Rackham are considered its "final flowering".

== Modern revival ==
The interest in fantasy art and literature since the 1970s has seen a revival in the topics and styles of Victorian fairy painting, often in novel contexts. While artists such as Stephanie Pui-Mun Law have produced genre illustrations for book covers and role-playing games, the works of Brian Froud, also known for a series of illustrated fairy books, have been adapted into several successful motion pictures including The Dark Crystal (1982) and Labyrinth (1986). The concept design work of Alan Lee and John Howe for The Lord of the Rings (film series) (2001–03), for which the former won an Oscar, would change popular perceptions of the depiction of fairy cultures. The 2003 book, The Art of Faery, written by David Riche and mentored by Froud, contributed to the careers of twenty fairy artists of this revival movement, including Amy Brown, Myrea Pettit, Jasmine Becket-Griffith, Philippe Fernandez, James Browne, and Jessica Galbreth, many of whom went on to author individual art books. Depictions of fae have made their way into popular culture in other ways, including clothing designs, ceramics, figurines, needlecraft, figurative art, and quilting, many marketed through Hot Topic to an international market online. Part of the growth in popularity over the past three decades is due to the New Age Movement. Renaissance fairs and science fiction conventions have also developed modern fairy art as a genre of collectibles.
