= John Anster Fitzgerald =

English painter

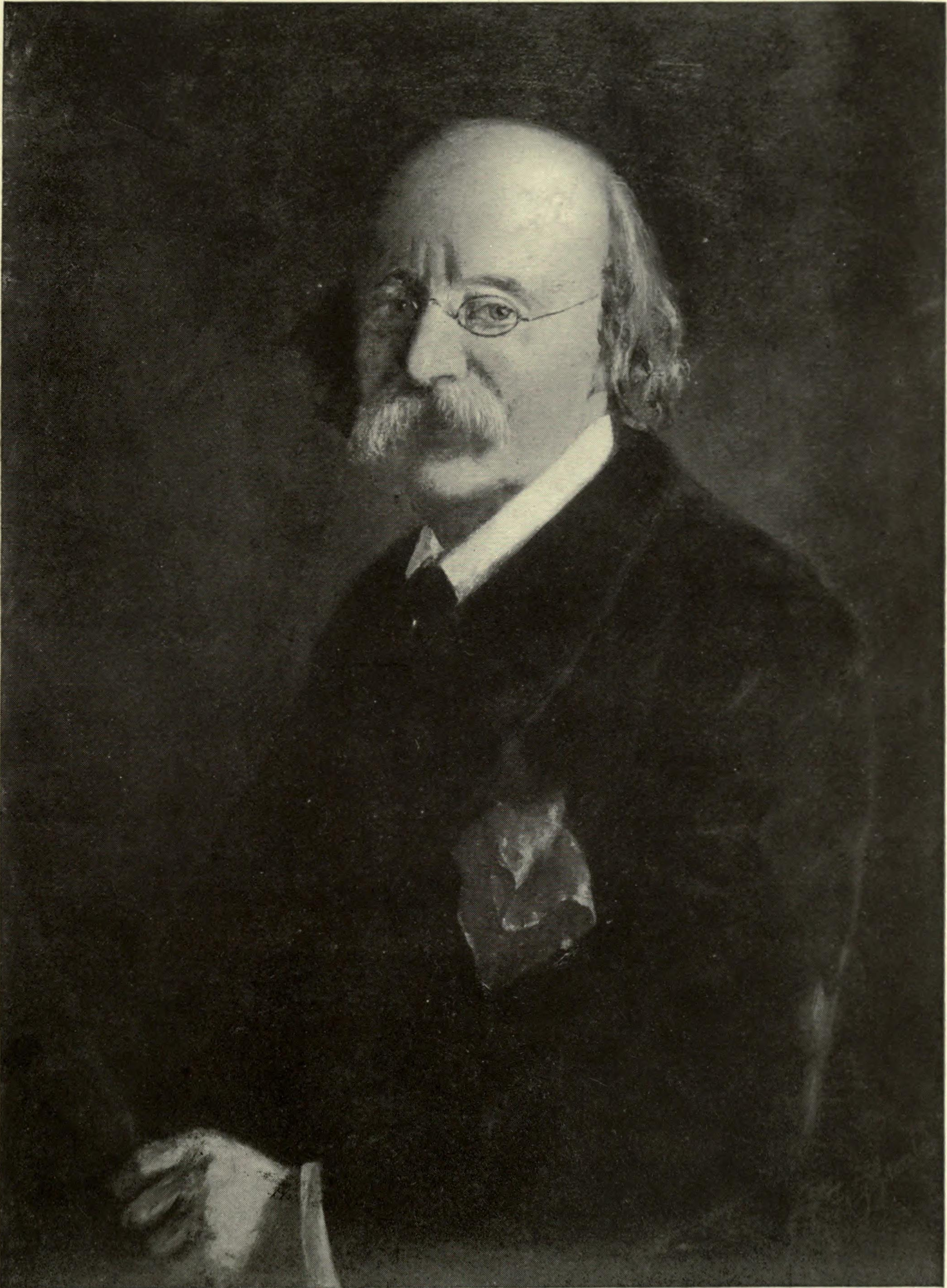
John Anster Fitzgerald circa 1880

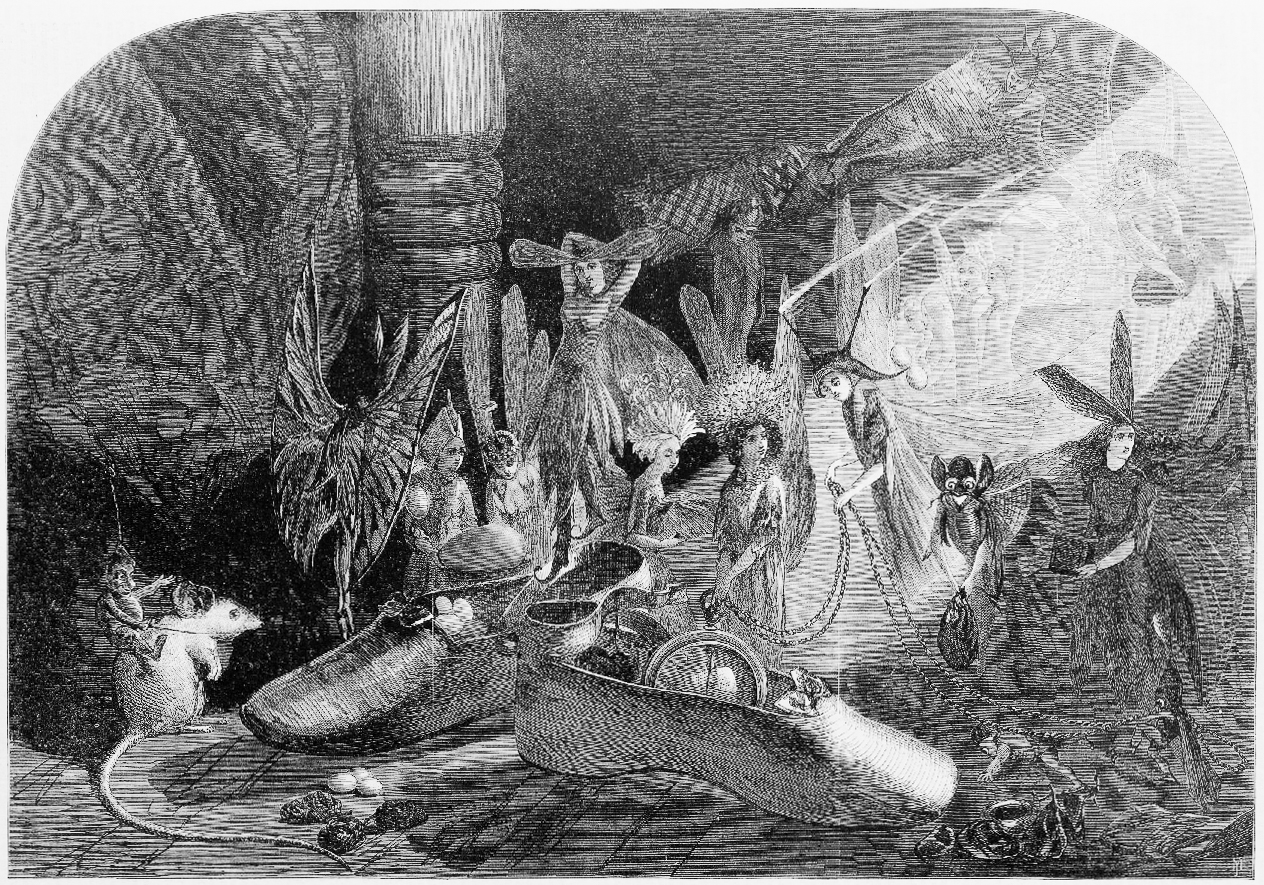
Fairy Gifts, Illustrated London News, 1868

John Anster Christian Fitzgerald (1819 – 1906) was a Victorian era fairy painter and portrait artist. He was nicknamed "Fairy Fitzgerald" for his main genre. Many of his fairy paintings are dark and contain images of ghouls, demons, and references to drug use; his work has been compared to the surreal nightmare-scapes of Hieronymus Bosch and Pieter Brueghel.

== Life and career ==
The year of his birth in Lambeth in south London has been variously given. (Note: Fitzgerald appears to have been baptised at St Mary's church, Lambeth, 5 February 1823, perhaps eldest son but at least second child of at least five. However on his death in 1906 he is said to have been aged 87.) He was of Irish ancestry, the son of the minor poet William Thomas Fitzgerald.

In 1849 Fitzgerald married Mary Ann Barr (Note: Mary Ann Barr was born in Marylebone 5 August 1830 and baptised at All Souls 7 November 1830. She died in 1899 at Mawson Row and was buried at St Nicholas, Chiswick on 23 December 1899 when she would have been aged 69. However the burial record states she was aged 72 which suggests her husband's age at death might have been equally unreliable and the year of his baptism most probably should be his year of birth —1823. This information was obtained from the places of birth provided in census returns, burial records and the appropriate parish registers.) and they raised at least four sons and two daughters.

As an artist, Fitzgerald appears to have been largely self-taught. His work was first shown at the Royal Academy of Arts, London, in 1845; he also exhibited at the British Institution, the Society of British Artists, and the Royal Watercolour Society. In the late 1850s he created a series of Christmas fairies for the Illustrated London News.

Fitzgerald gave his works titles that often gave little clear indication of their subjects; art dealers and collectors frequently renamed them, causing great confusion in his artistic canon. Some of Fitzgerald's titles, like The Pipe Dream and The Captive Dreamer, suggest that "Fitzgerald was familiar with the opium dens which, with chloral and laudanum, represented the Victorian drug scene."

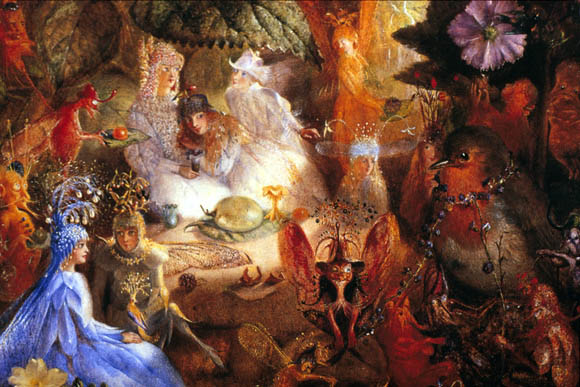
The Captive Robin c. 1864

Fitzgerald created "remarkable fairy pictures of pure fantasy, rarely based on any literary theme." His paintings often use brilliant colours, especially reds, blues, and purples, as in The Captive Robin shown here. He produced a major series of paintings on the Cock Robin theme—among others, Who Killed Cock Robin?, Cock Robin Defending his Nest, and Fairies Sleeping in a Bird's Nest (the last furnished with a frame made out of twigs).

Reclusive by nature, Fitzgerald had limited connections with other artists. He existed mainly at his London club, the Savage Club. Fellow members, reminiscing of him post mortem, recalled that he was adept at imitating the great actors of earlier generations, Edmund Kean, Charles Kemble, and William Charles Macready.

The final work Fitzgerald exhibited at the Royal Academy, in 1902, was a picture of Alice in Wonderland. Twentieth-century art forgers have been active in creating phony Fitzgerald fairy pictures. The forgeries were discovered when analysis revealed modern pigments. Brought to public attention by the 1998 exhibition of Victorian fairy paintings at the Royal Academy of Arts his paintings have since sold for up to £500,000, although most sell at prices between £30,000 and £120,000.

His younger daughter, Florence Harriet Fitzgerald (1857–1927), was a painter and sculptor. She married landscape artist Walter Follen Bishop (1856–1936) in 1889.

== Gallery ==
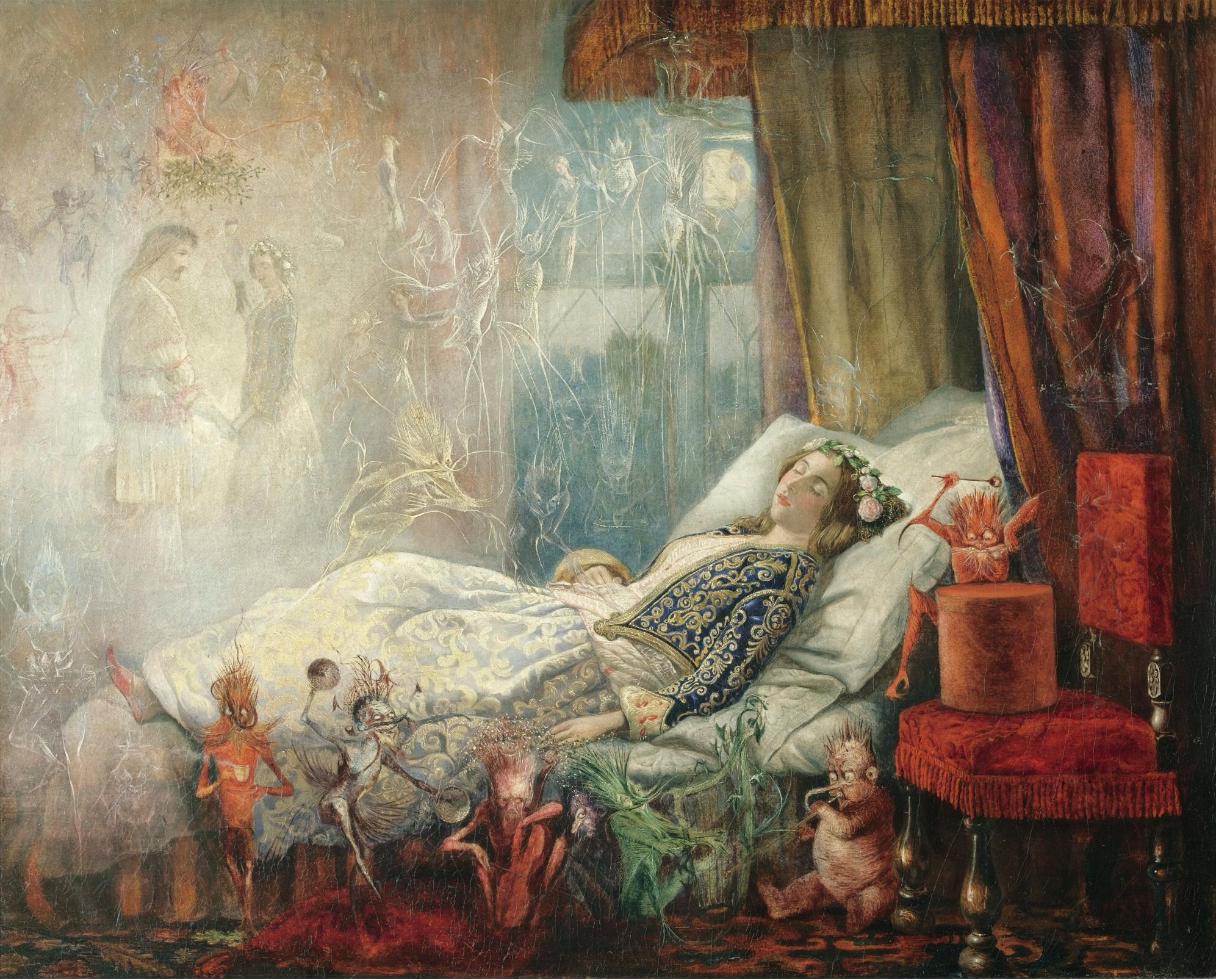
Dreams

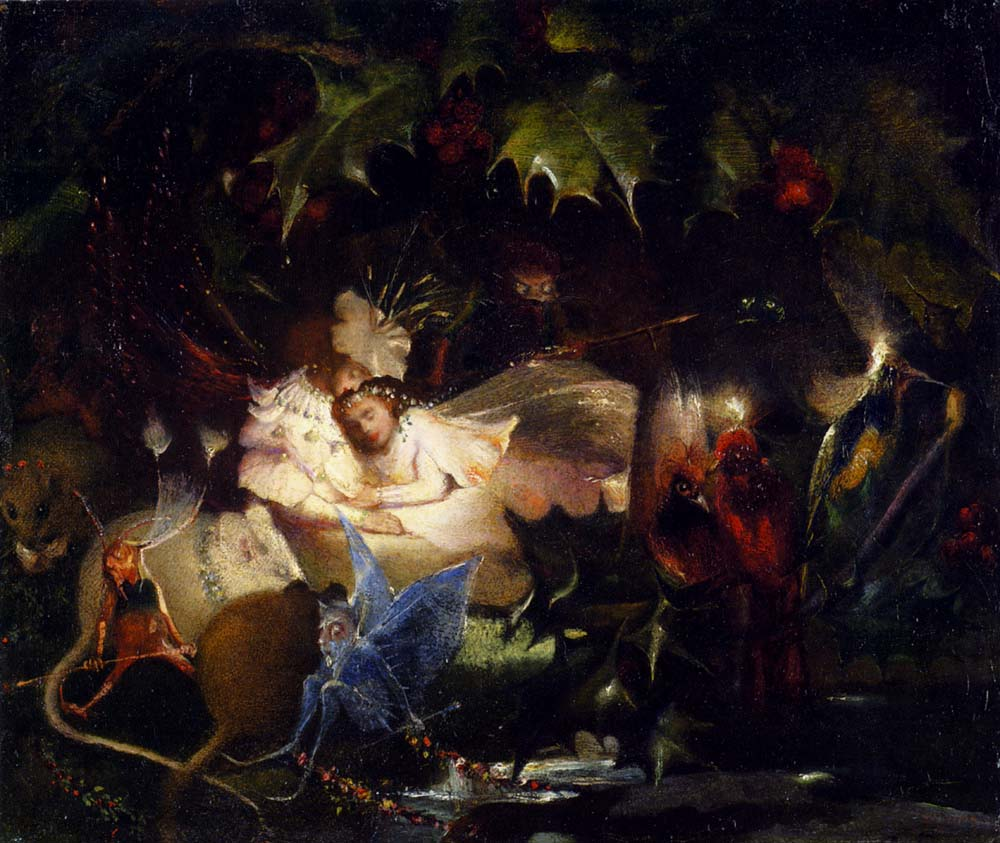
The Fairy Bower

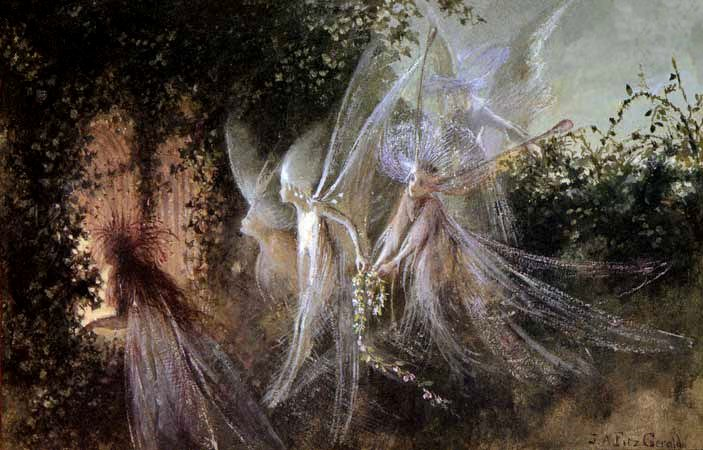
Fairy Passage

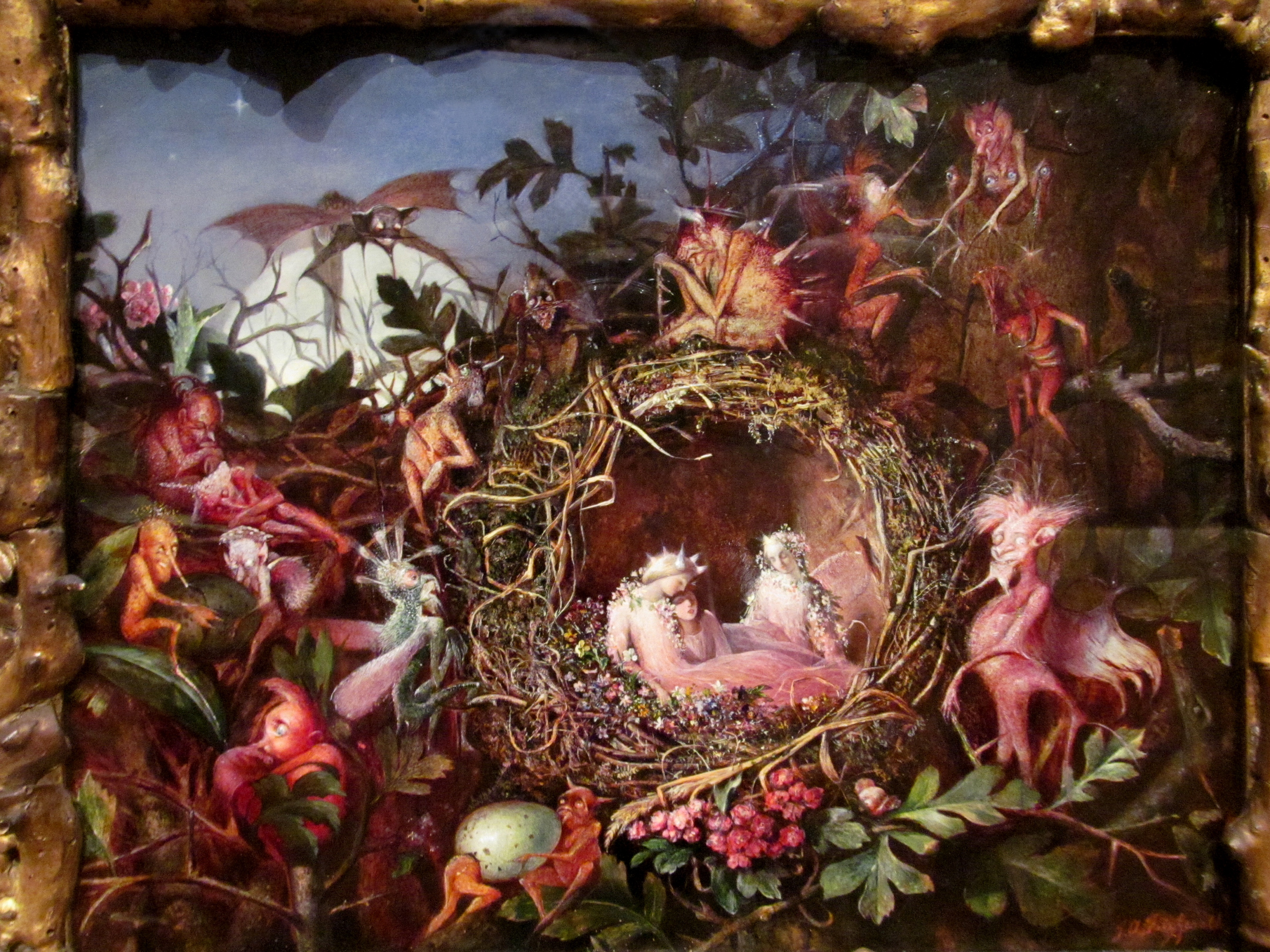
Fairies in a bird's nest

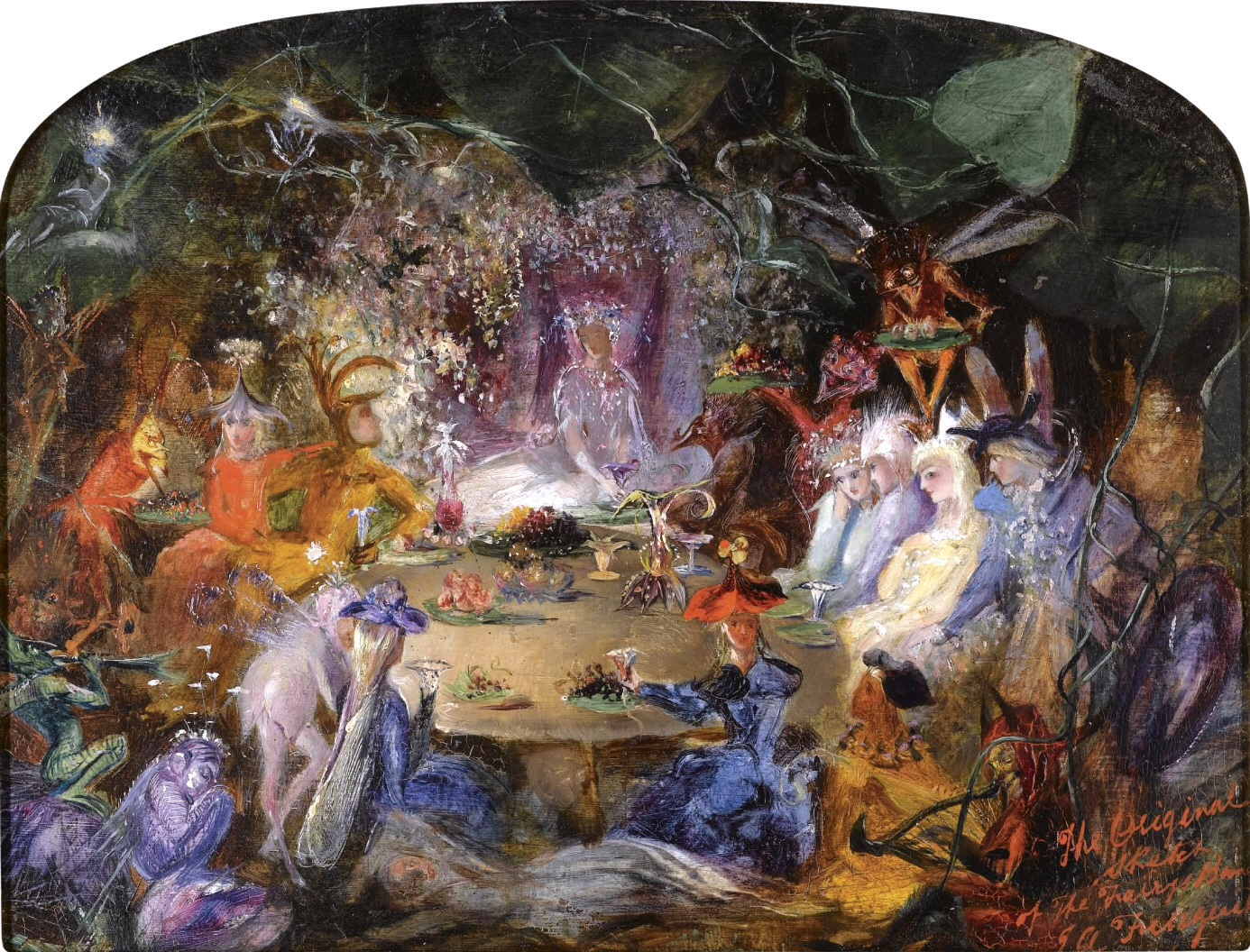
The Fairies' Banquet

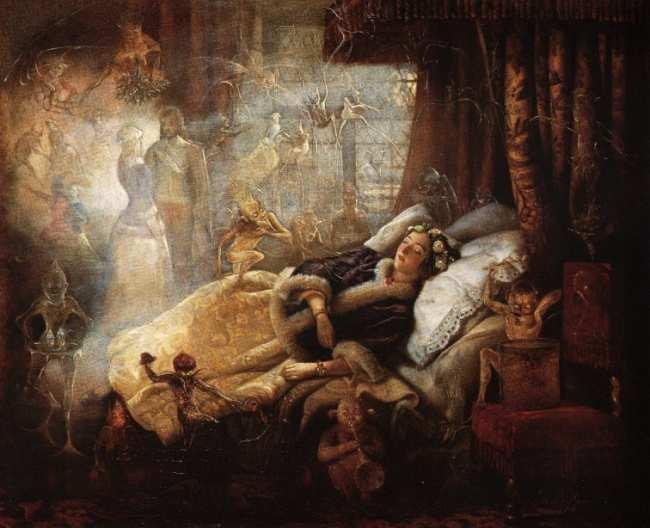
Dreams

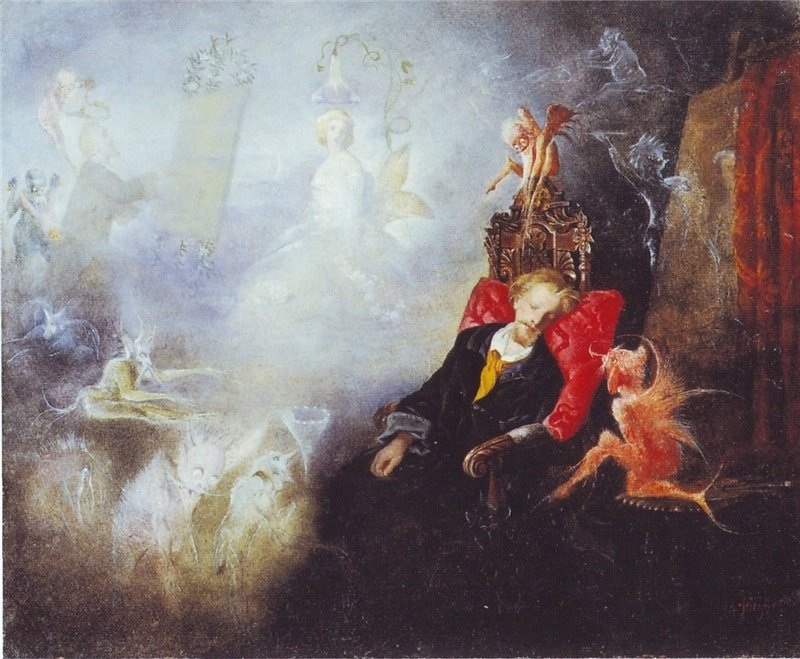
The Artist's Dream

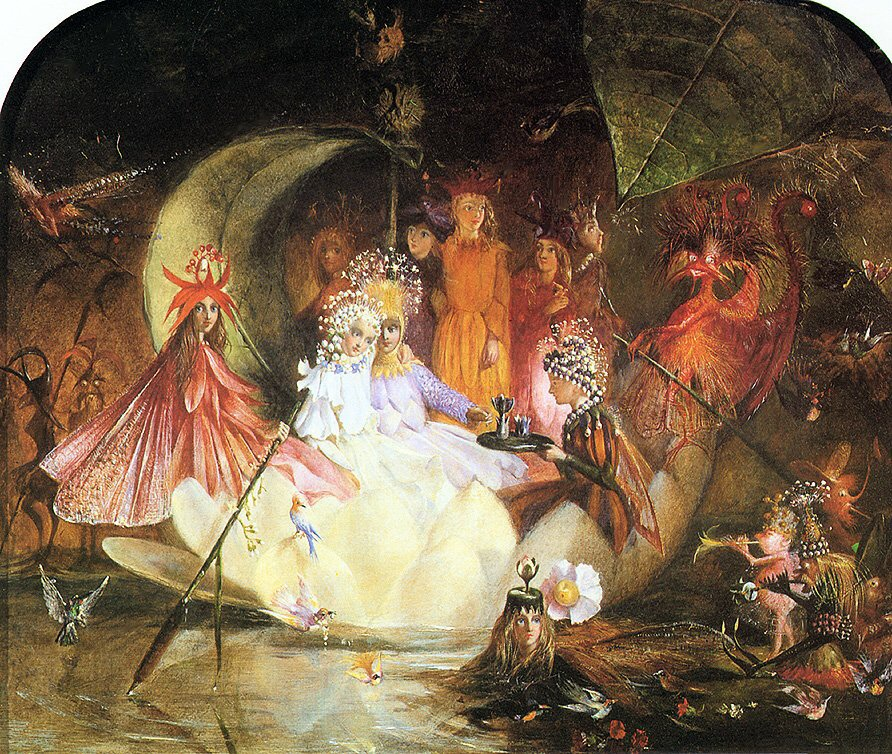
The Fairy's Barque

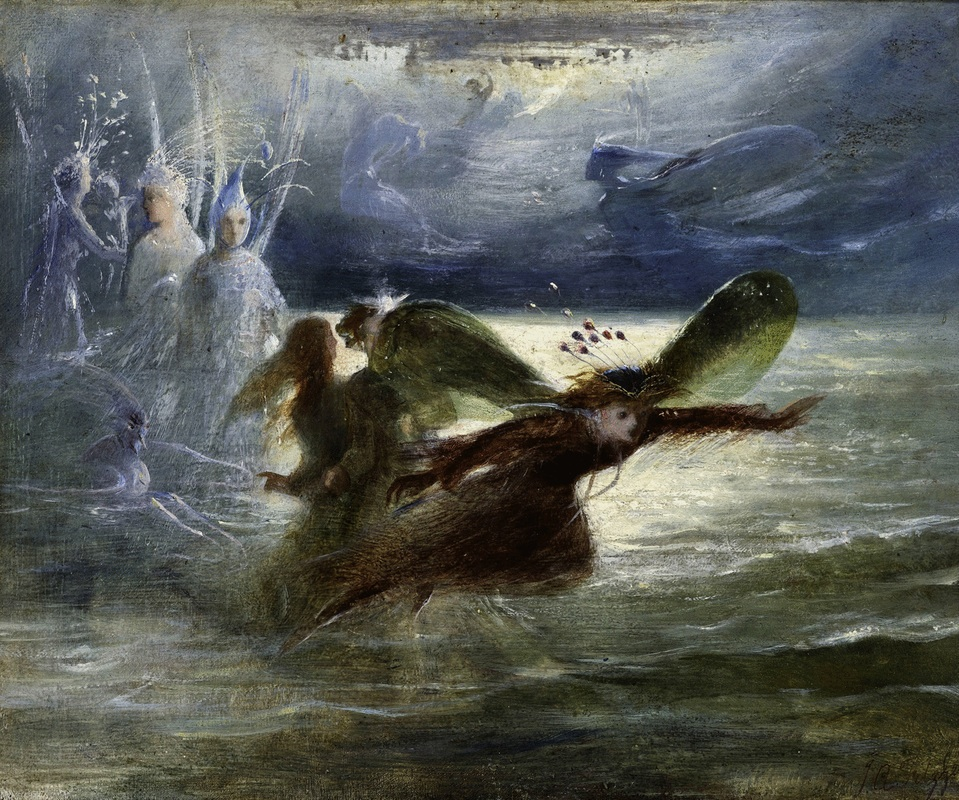
Sea Sprites in Flight

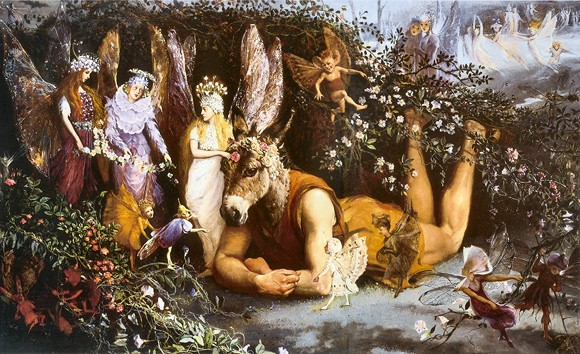
Titania and Bottom (from A Midsummer Night's Dream)
