= Titania and Bottom =

Painting by Henry Fuseli

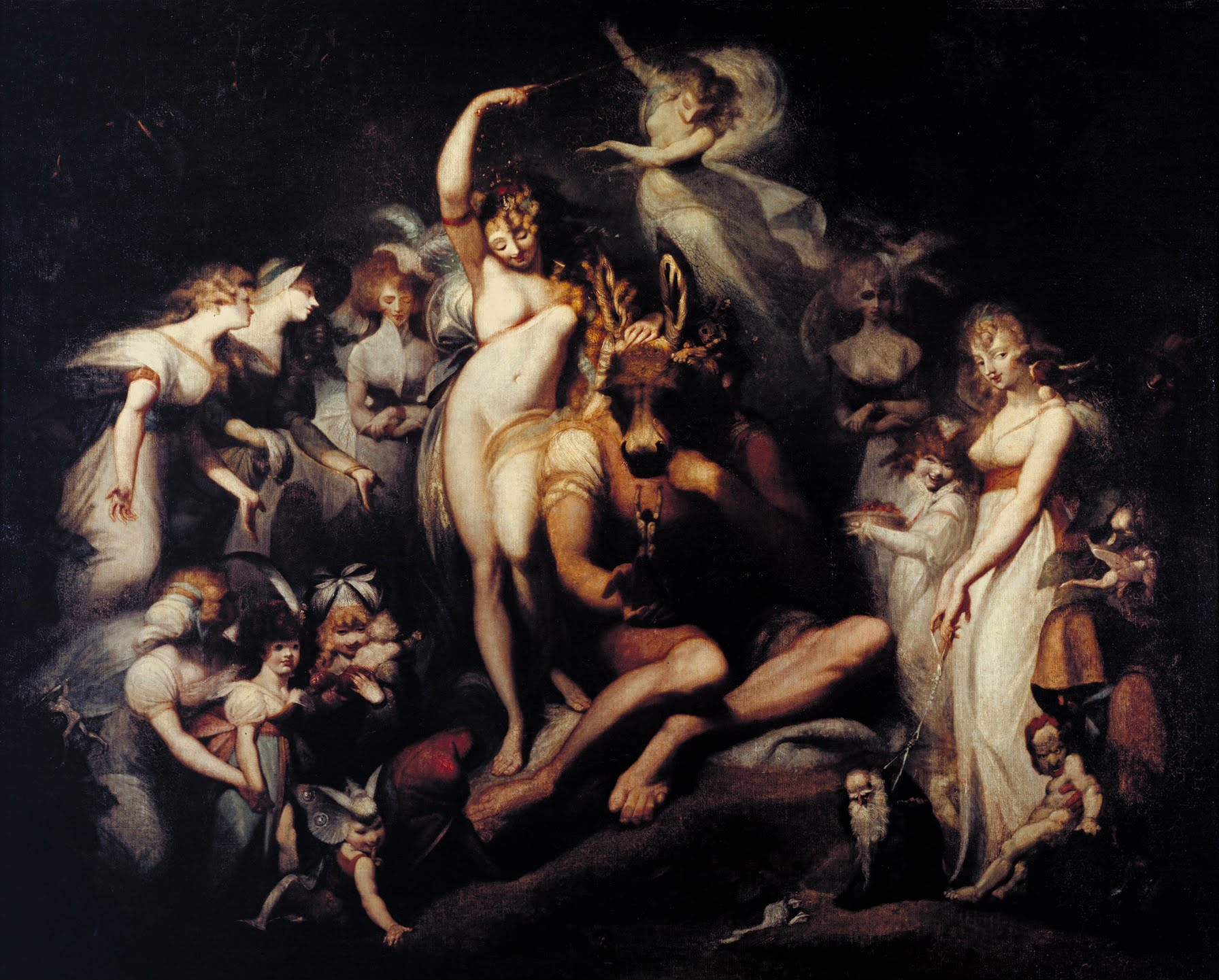
- Artist: Henry Fuseli
- Year: c. 1790
- Medium: Oil on canvas
- Dimensions: 217.2 cm × 275.6 cm (85.5 in × 108.5 in)
- Location: Tate Britain, London

Titania and Bottom is an oil painting by the Anglo-Swiss painter Henry Fuseli. It dates to around 1790 and is in Tate Britain, in London. It was commissioned for the Boydell Shakespeare Gallery and depicts a scene from A Midsummer Night's Dream by William Shakespeare.

== Background ==
Henry Fuseli had become familiar with William Shakespeare's plays as a student in Zürich. He used them as the basis for paintings throughout his career. He became famous for his treatment of supernatural matters, which gave a special appeal to A Midsummer Night's Dream, along with plays like The Tempest, Hamlet and Macbeth.

Titania and Bottom was commissioned by the publisher John Boydell for his Shakespeare Gallery. Fuseli also made a large pendant for Boydell's gallery, Titania's Awakening, which depicts a later moment from the same scene.

== Subject and composition ==
The painting depicts a moment from the first scene of the fourth act of William Shakespeare's play A Midsummer Night's Dream. Titania, Queen of the Fairies, is under the influence of a love potion, given to her by her husband Oberon to punish her for her pride. The potion has made her fall in love with the weaver Nick Bottom, who in turn is under a spell which has transformed his head into that of an ass. Titania stands next to the seated Bottom. Her right hand is raised and holds a wand and her left hand rests on the donkey's head. They are surrounded by a group of beings of different sizes, called by Titania to attend to Bottom. A fairy servant scratches Bottom's head and another stands on his hand, offering assistance. A girl to the right has brought a basket of dried peas. A hooded woman to the right is holding a changeling made of wax, and to the left is a group of children artificially created by witches.

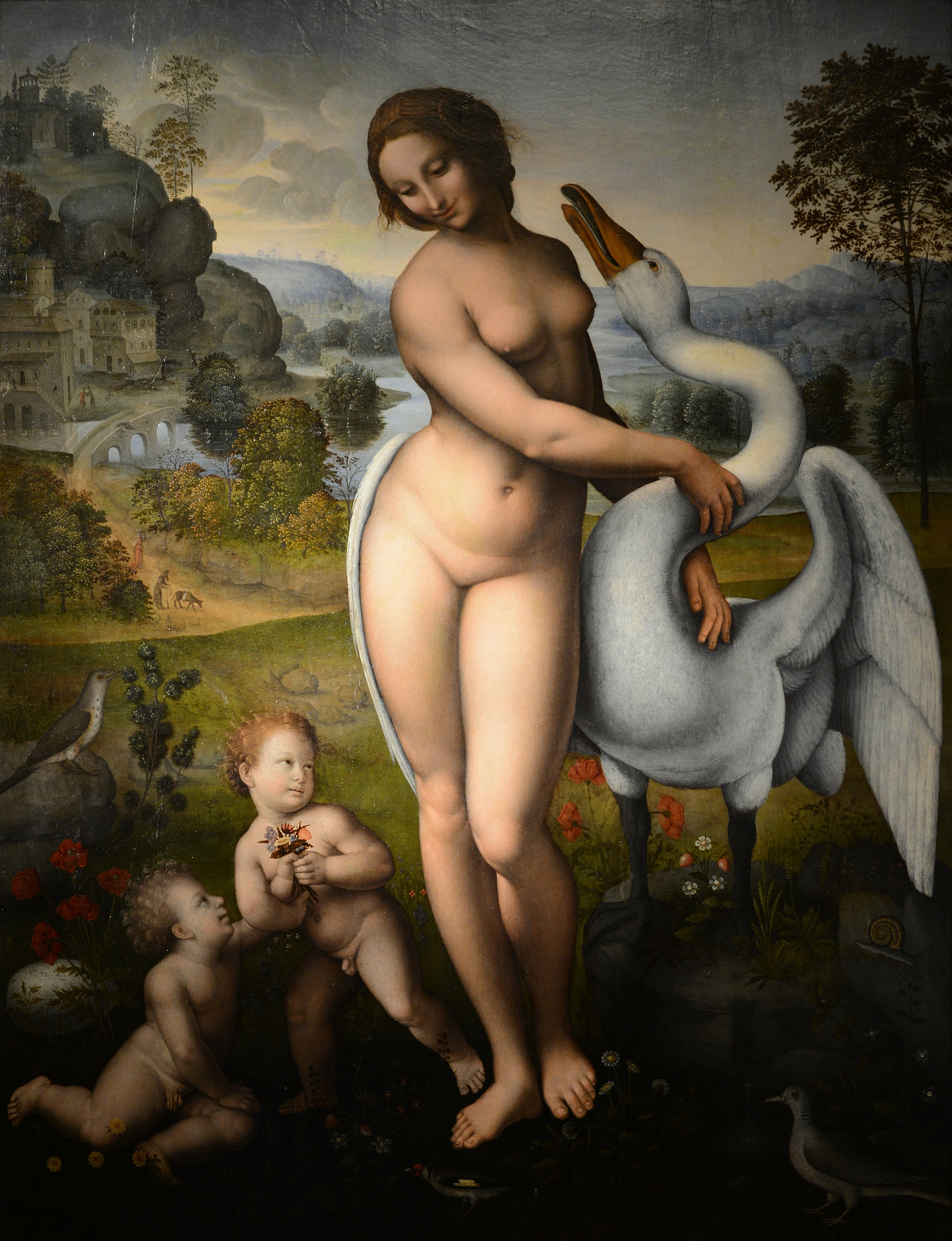
Titania's pose was inspired by Leonardo da Vinci's Leda and the Swan (copy attributed to Il Sodoma).

Titania's seductive pose is adapted from Leda and the Swan by Leonardo da Vinci. Two fairies plunging into calyces to the right are inspired by one of Sandro Botticelli's illustrations for Dante's Divine Comedy, "Canto XXX" from Paradiso. At the bottom left is a girl with a butterfly head, who follows a type of child portrait developed by Joshua Reynolds, where a child posing with a pet animal exhibits features from that animal. A woman on the right is reminiscent of Jan Steen's sexually suggestive The Oyster Eater, but instead of offering an oyster, the woman holds a tiny old man in a leash, suggesting female sexual domination. Like Titania's Awakening, the painting also borrows figures from works by the Dutch painter Abraham Bloemaert.

== Provenance ==
Since 1887, the painting has been in the collection of the Tate galleries. It is exhibited at Tate Britain as part of the display Walk Through British Art.

== See also ==
- Fairy painting
- 100 Great Paintings, 1980 BBC series
