= The Fairy Feller's Master-Stroke =

Painting by Richard Dadd

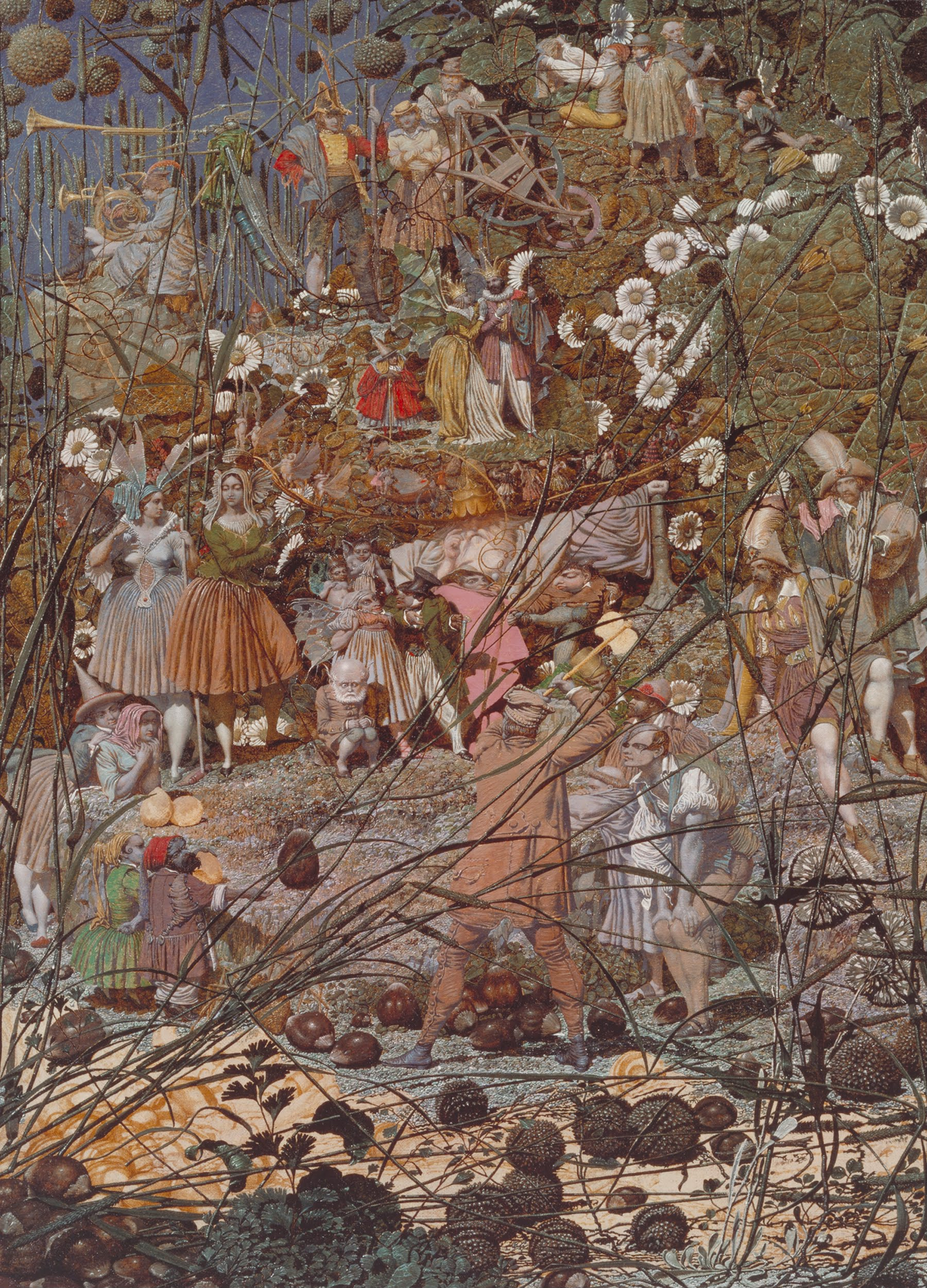
- Artist: Richard Dadd
- Year: 1855
- Completion date: 1864
- Medium: Oil on canvas
- Movement: Fairy painting
- Dimensions: 540 mm × 394 mm (21 in × 15.5 in)
- Location: Tate Gallery, London
- Accession: T00598
- Website: www.tate.org.uk/art/artworks/dadd-the-fairy-fellers-master-stroke-t00598

The Fairy Feller's Master-Stroke is a painting by English artist Richard Dadd. It was begun in 1855 and worked on until 1864. Dadd painted it while incarcerated in the State Criminal Lunatic Asylum of Bethlem Royal Hospital, where he was confined after he murdered his father in 1843. It was commissioned by George Henry Haydon, who was head steward of the hospital at the time.

== History ==
Dadd had begun his career as a painter of fairy paintings before the onset of his mental illness. After he was committed, he was encouraged to resume painting. G. H. Haydon was impressed by Dadd's artistic efforts and asked for a fairy painting of his own. Dadd worked on the painting for nine years, paying microscopic attention to detail and using a layering technique to produce 3D-like results. Although it is generally regarded as his most important work, Dadd himself considered the painting to be unfinished (the background of the lower left corner is only sketched in).

In order to give context to his work, Dadd subsequently wrote a long poem by the name of Elimination of a Picture & its Subject—called The Fellers' Master Stroke in which each of the characters appearing in the picture is given a name and purpose—including myriad references to old English folklore and Shakespeare—in an apparent attempt to show that the painting's unique composition was not merely a product of random, wild inspiration.

The canvas is crowded with figures, packed amid giant flowers, twigs, and blades of grass, with a sombre palette of browns and tans. At the centre is the "fairy-feller", axe raised, on the verge of cleaving a nut in two. A bearded patriarchal figure wearing a gold papal crown stands nearby, about to motion the axeman to strike. Around this pair is an assemblage of peasants, soldiers, winged fairies, Oberon and Titania, and a trumpet-playing crane fly. Critic Adam Roberts describes it as "a bustling composition, obsessively worked in immense, miniature detail, horror vacui and almost fractal in the way it draws the eye in."

At the top right a figure representing Dadd's murdered father, a pharmacist, wields a mortar and pestle, and a young boy, presumably Dadd himself, reaches across with what appears to be blood pouring from his fingers. Roberts postulates the painting an allegory of parricide, "Dadd refracting his own crime through fairy-fantasy, miniaturizing it as if to rob it of its awful force of guilt and regret."

Dadd signed the back of the canvas with the inscription: "The Fairy-Feller's Master-Stroke, Painted for G. H. Haydon Esqre by Rd. Dadd quasi 1855–64". According to Patricia Allderidge, 'quasi' "may mean that it was set aside during that period or that it took a long time to start". The end date, 1864, coincides with Dadd's transfer to Broadmoor Hospital in Berkshire, the asylum where he spent the remaining 21 years of his life.

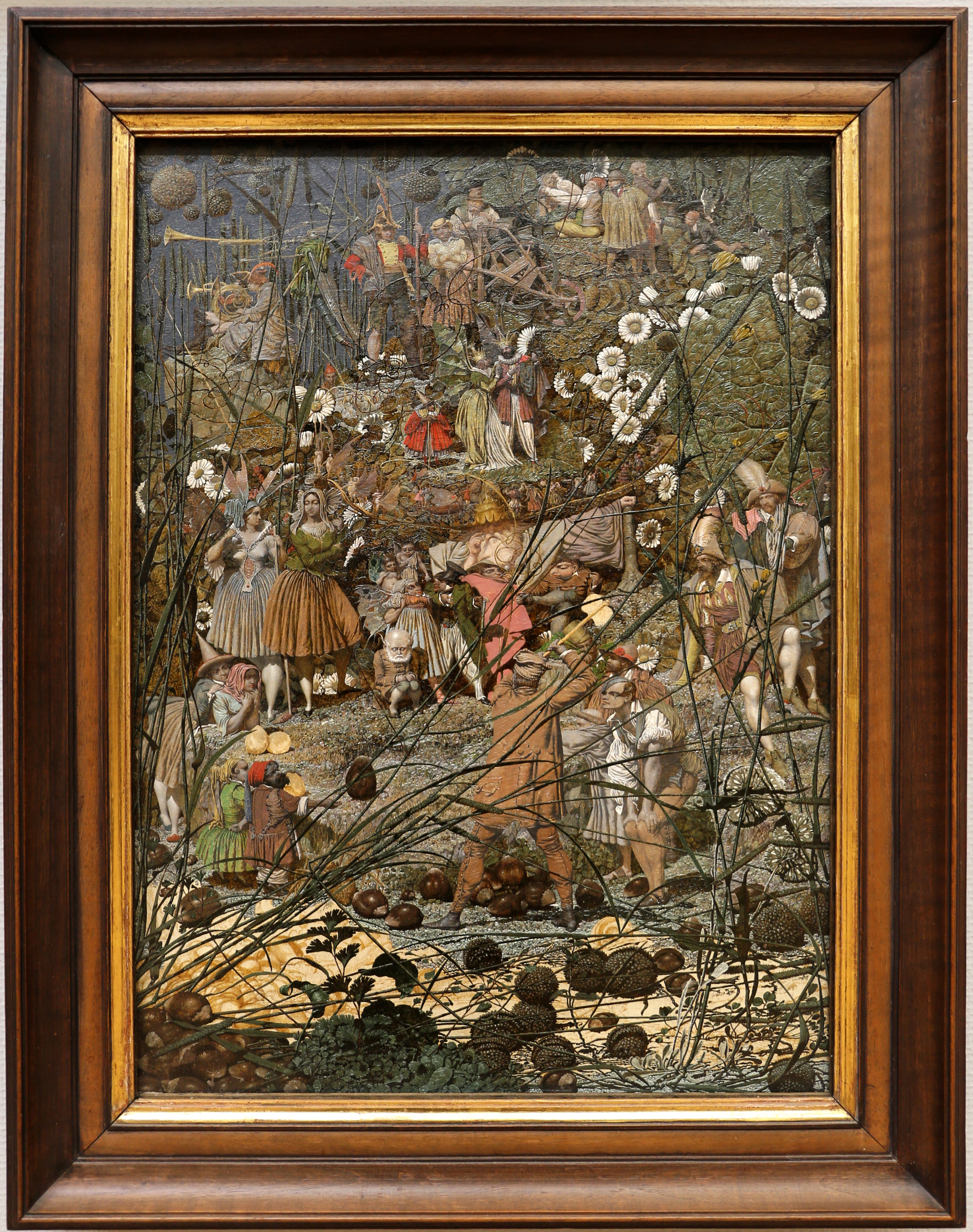
The painting in the Tate Britain

From Haydon the painting passed to collector Alfred Morrison, whose daughter Katharine Gatty gave it to the war poet Siegfried Sassoon when he married her daughter Hester in 1933. Sassoon withdrew it from a Sotheby's auction on 29 May 1963 and presented it to the Tate Gallery "in memory of his friend and fellow officer Julian Dadd, a grandnephew of the artist, and of his [Julian's] two brothers [Stephen Gabriel and Edmund] who gave their lives in the First World War". Julian Dadd was severely wounded in the war and died by suicide in 1937. The painting is now in the Tate Britain collection. In 1998 it was included in the exhibition Victorian Fairy Painting at the Frick Museum in New York City.

== In other works ==
- The Queen song "The Fairy Feller's Master-Stroke" from the 1974 album Queen II was born of Freddie Mercury's appreciation of the work; it makes direct reference to the painting's characters as detailed in Dadd's poem. Adam Roberts called it "a fine piece of prog-rock that celebrates the verve and detail of Dadd's painting, but which in its camp upbeat energy entirely misses the melancholia of the original."
- Terry Pratchett's novel The Wee Free Men contains a scene inspired by the painting.
- The painting, the art of the insane, and Dadd are mentioned in the novel, Mortal Love, by Elizabeth Hand.
- The work is a central plot element in the novel The Witches of Chiswick by Robert Rankin.
- Neil Gaiman wrote a tribute to the painting for the July/August 2013 edition of Intelligent Life magazine.
- The painting appears in Alex Bledsoe's Tufa novels.
- Former Gorky's Zygotic Mynci singer Euros Childs included an instrumental song titled "The Fairy Feller's Master-Stroke" on his 2009 solo album, Son of Euro Child.
- Mark Chadbourn's "The Fairy Feller's Master Stroke", about a contemporary young man looking for meanings in the painting, won the British Fantasy Award for best short story in 2003.
- Octavio Paz devoted a chapter on Richard Dadd and this painting in particular in his book The Monkey Grammarian.
- The Throbs album The Language of Thieves and Vagabonds cover art has fragments of the painting (Geffen Records, 1991).
- The penultimate issue of Alan Moore's The League of Extraordinary Gentlemen comics is titled after the painting and includes a sequence featuring the life of Dadd, who is depicted as being trapped in the painting following his death.
- The song “Dancing in the Temple”, by Swedish heavy metal band Candlemass is inspired by the painting.
- The novel "Solace House" by Will Maclean makes repeated references to both the painting and the Queen song.

== Bibliography ==
- Allderidge, Patricia (1974). Richard Dadd. New York and London: St. Martin's Press/Academy Editions.
- MacGregor, John (1989). The Discovery of the Art of the Insane. Princeton University Press. ISBN 0-691-04071-0
- Roberts, Adam (2025). Fantasy: a short history. London: Bloomsbury Academic. ISBN 978-1-3504-0782-4.
- Winkfield, Trevor (2014). Georges Braque and Others: The Selected Art Writings of Trevor Winkfield (1990–2009). New York: Song Cave. ISBN 978-0-9884643-3-9.
