= James Forbes (divine) =

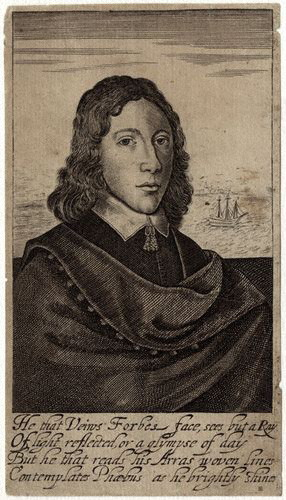
James Forbes, engraving by unknown artist.

James Forbes (c.1629–31 May 1712) was a Scottish nonconformist divine.

== Life ==
Forbes was born in or about 1629. He was educated at Aberdeen University, where he proceeded M.A., being subsequently admitted ad eundem at Oxford. In 1654 he was sent to Gloucester Cathedral, where he preached "with great success, but to the apparent danger of shortening his life". At the Restoration he was speedily ejected from the cathedral, but he still continued at Gloucester, "ministering privately as he could". Struck by his talents, Robert Frampton, then dean, but afterwards bishop of Gloucester, "courted him to conformity in vain".

In consequence of the "Yarranton Plot" or "Pakington Plot", he was committed to Chepstow Castle, where he was kept a long while. On regaining his liberty he returned to his pastoral charge; he was often imprisoned in Gloucester, on one occasion for a whole year; he was indicted under the Corporation Act, the penalty of which was imprisonment. He was also indicted under 23 James I, the penalty of which was £20 a month, and under 35 Elizabeth, of which the penalty was to abjure the realm or suffer death. At the same time, also, he was excommunicated, and the writ de excom. capiendo was out against him.

At the time of Monmouth's rebellion he retired to Enfield, Middlesex, and there continued in his ministry. He was later recalled to Gloucester, where he continued to labour until his death. Altogether, he exercised his ministry in Gloucester for fifty-eight years, less one month. He died 31 May 1712, aged 83, and was buried under his own communion-table. His funeral sermon was preached by John Noble of Bristol. Edmund Calamy, who represents him as the model of a nonconformist divine, states that at his death he left gifts to charitable uses, including his library. Many of the books in this collection, numbering 1800 or so, are in the Rare Book Room of the University of Toronto.

== Works ==
- Nehustan; or, John Elliot's "Saving Grace in all Men" proved to be No Grace, and His Increated Being in All, a Great Nothing. By J. F.. London, 1694. Elliot, who was a Gloucester Quaker, published a reply in the following year, The Grace of God asserted to be Saving and Increated.
- A Summary of that Knowledge and Practice that leads to Heaven. London, 1700.
- God's Goodness to His Israel in All Ages. Being the Substance of some Sermons on Psalm lxxiii. 1. By J. F., minister of the Gospel. London, 1700.
- Pastoral Instruction: being some Remains of the Reverend James Forbes, M.A., late Minister of the Gospel in Glocester. Containing I. A Farewel-Letter of Advice to his People. II. The Sum of the Last Sermon he preach'd before the Ministers of his County, June 19th 1711. III. His Short Counsel to Youth. To which is added his Funeral-Sermon, preach'd at Glocester, June 3d, 1712. By J[ohn] N[oble]. London, 1713.
