= Alexander Morison =

British doctor (1779–1866)

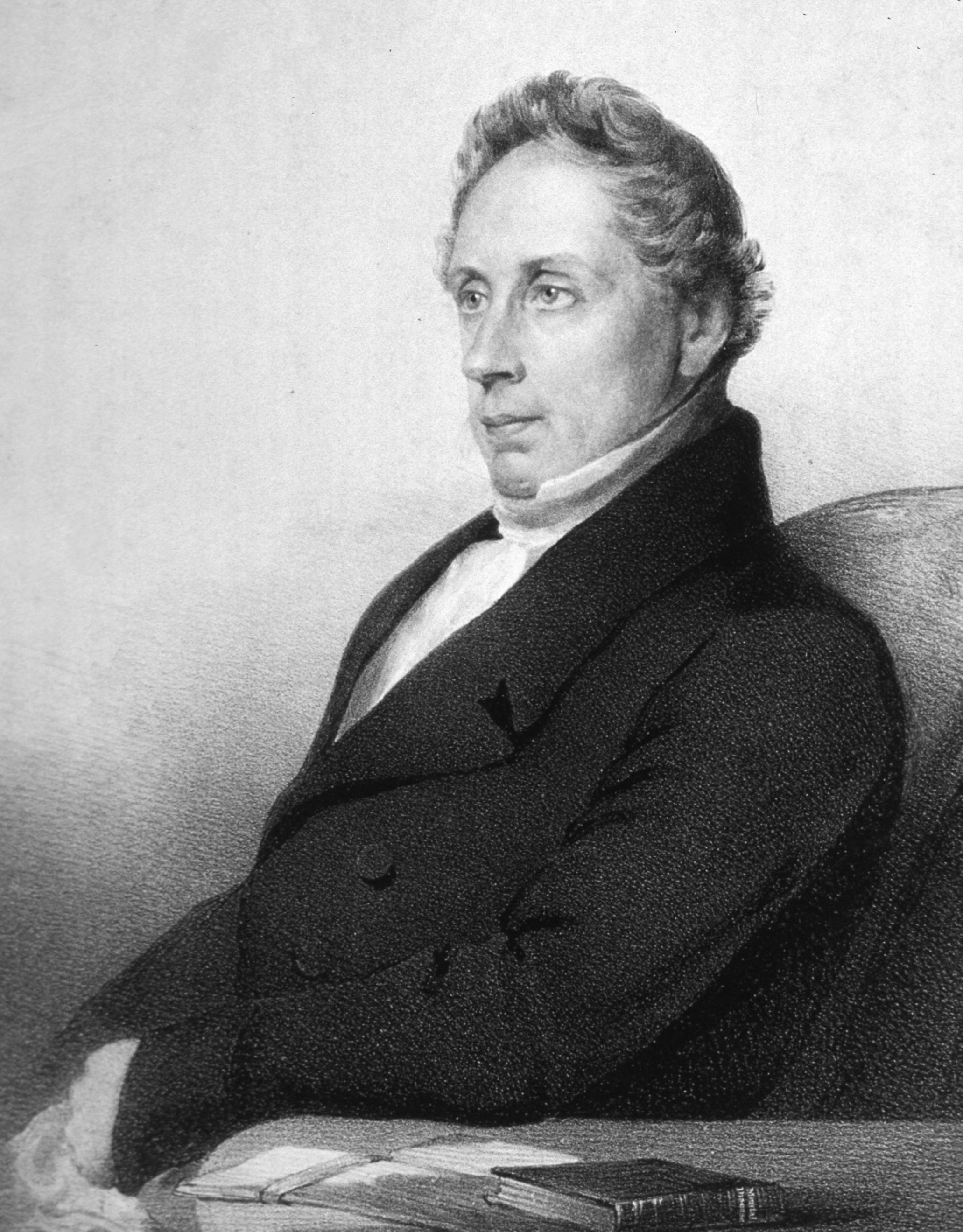
Alexander Morison c. 1829

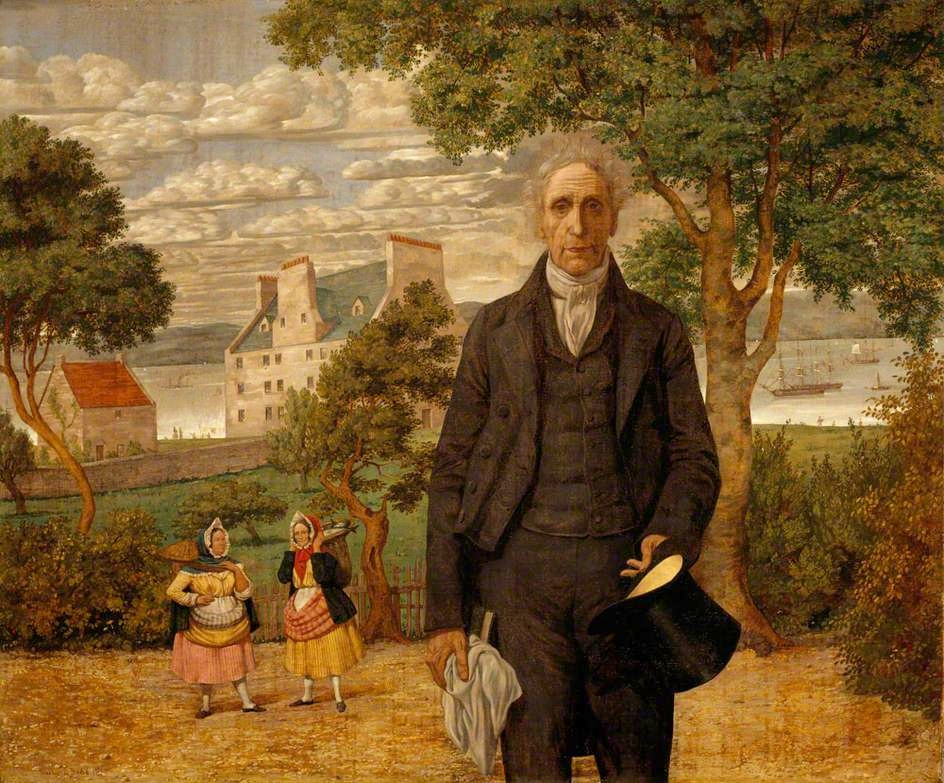
Alexander Morison, 1852 portrait by Richard Dadd, a patient

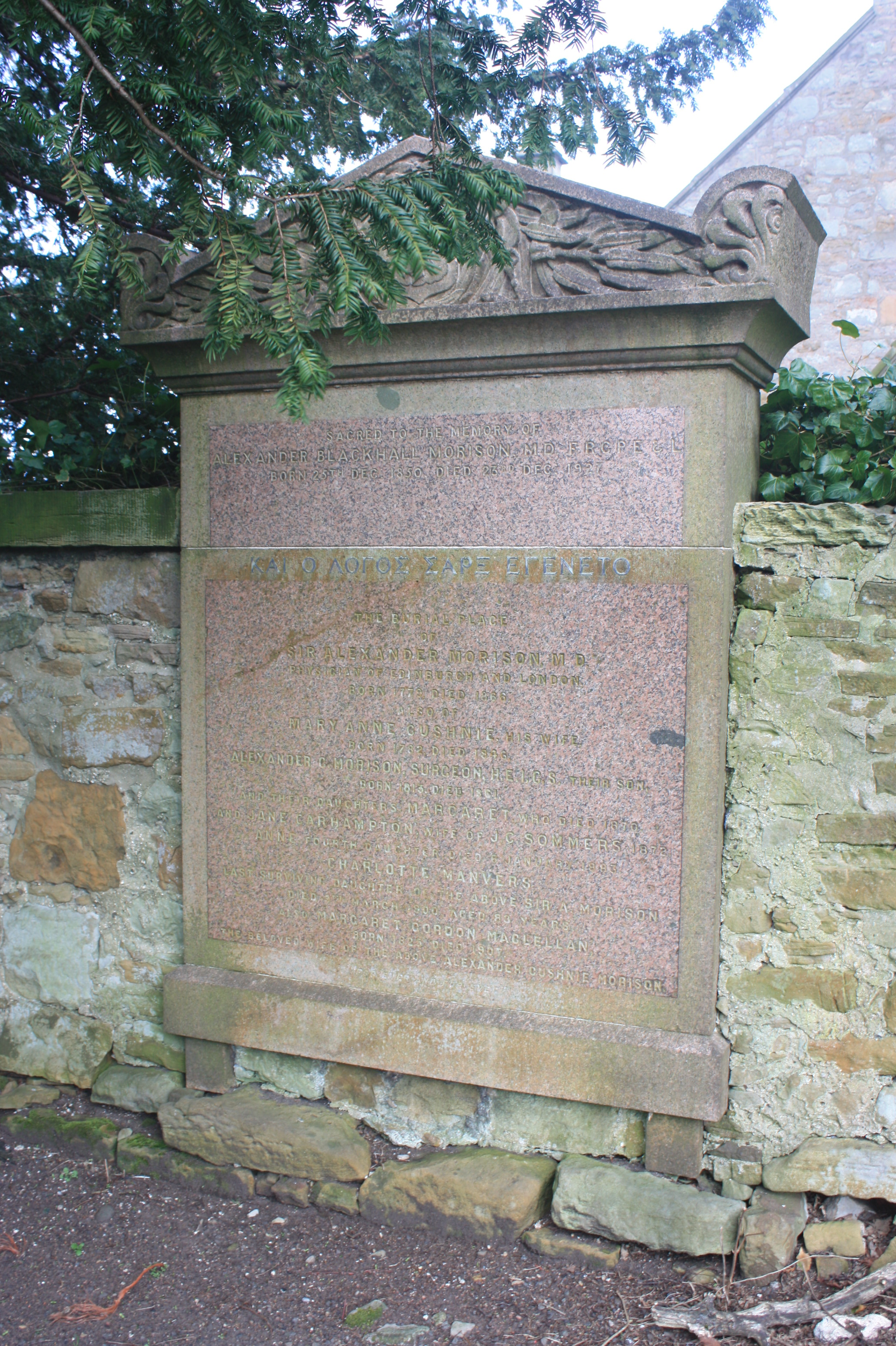
The grave of Dr Alexander Morison, Currie churchyard

Sir Alexander Morison M.D. FRCPE FRCP (1 May 1779 – 14 March 1866) was a Scottish physician and alienist (psychiatrist).

== Life ==
Morison was born at Anchorfield, near Edinburgh, and was educated at Edinburgh High School and the University of Edinburgh, where he graduated M.D. on 12 September 1799. He became a licentiate of the Edinburgh College of Physicians in 1800 and a Fellow in 1801. He would serve as President of the college from 1827 to 1829.

For a time, Morison practised in Edinburgh, but during 1808 he moved to London; on 11 April that year he was admitted a licentiate of the College of Physicians of London, and 10 July 1841 he was elected a Fellow. He was appointed inspecting physician of lunatic asylums in Surrey in 1810, and from 7 May 1835 physician to Bethlehem Hospital. He was physician to Charlotte, Princess Royal, and was knighted in 1838.

Morison gave an annual course of lectures on mental diseases – commemorated in the Morisonian Lectures of the Royal College of Physicians of Edinburgh – and became a recognised authority on this subject. Morison's lecture courses were partly funded by Harriot Coutts (née Mellon), the widow of famous banker Thomas Coutts. Morison served as her in-house physician in 1822-1823 and she bestowed an endowment on him to establish a course of lectures on mental disease in memory of her late husband.

A lifelong restlessness seems to have haunted Morison's career – as a child he repeatedly ran away from school in Edinburgh (on one occasion as far as to the harbour in Arbroath) – and, as an adult, he (like Lord Monboddo) excited astonishment with his regular, exhausting rides between London and Edinburgh, lecturing in both cities. A portrait of Morison – of almost hallucinatory intensity – was created by the psychotic Victorian artist Richard Dadd in 1852, and it incorporated images of Anchorfield created by Morison's daughter. This picture now hangs in the Scottish National Portrait Gallery.

Morison died at home, Balerno Hill House, south-west of Edinburgh on 14 March 1866, and was buried at Currie. His grave stands in the eastern wall in the north-east corner of the original churchyard.

His death was marked by an extraordinary tribute from William A.F. Browne, the President of the Medico-Psychological Association, in the course of his 1866 Presidential Address in which he linked Morison's achievements with those of John Conolly, who had died only a few days earlier.

His wife Grace (1810-1889) is buried in Dean Cemetery in one of the small southern sections.

== Works ==
Morison's graduation thesis was De Hydrocephalo Phrenitico, and he became specialist in cerebral diseases and mental illness. He published in 1826 Outlines of Lectures on Mental Diseases, and in 1828 Cases of Mental Disease, with Practical Observations on the Medical Treatment. In 1840 he published The Physiognomy of Mental Diseases, an important contribution to the literature of physiognomy. It features some illustrations, including a portrait of Jonathan Martin the arsonist.

== Alexander Morison Medal ==
Morison endowed lectures (through the sale of his property starting in 1864) on subjects connected with the mental disease; later extended to cover diseases connected with the nervous system.

== Notes ==
Attribution

This article incorporates text from a publication now in the public domain: Lee, Sidney, ed. (1892). "Morison, Alexander". Dictionary of National Biography. Vol. 31. London: Smith, Elder & Co.
