= Sarah Clayton =

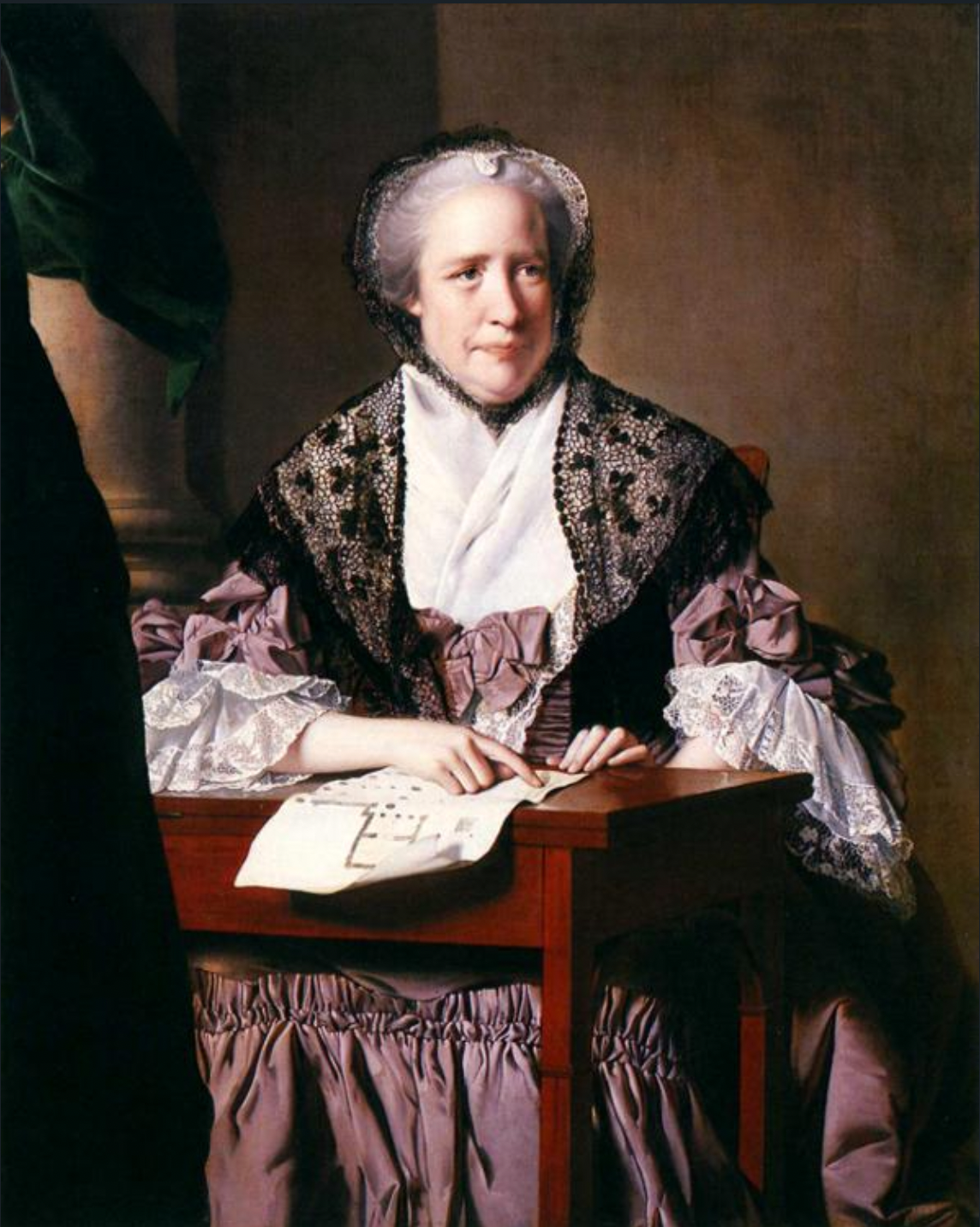
The late Sarah Clayton, portrait by Joseph Wright

Sarah Clayton (1712–1779) was an English industrialist. She was the owner of the major Parr colliery, and known as the 'Queen of Parr'.

She was the daughter of merchant alderman and major of Liverpool William Clayton (d. 1715). She never married and thus gained legal majority at age 25.

She inherited land near Liverpool. Between 1746 and 1751, she developed her land by founding Clayton Square and likely also the Leigh, Tyrer, Houghton, Parker and Case street in Liverpool.

In 1756, she acquired the colliery in Parr Hall. In 1757, the Sankey channel expanded from Liverpool to Parr, giving her a substantial benefit to other collieries in regard to the Liverpool trade. She provided coal to Liverpool during the developing Industrial Revolution, which for a time made her into the perhaps most successful merchant in Liverpool. She worked in collaboration with her nephew Thomas Case who was a slave trader but who also owned a colliery near her mine, and together, the Clayton-Case alliance controlled the coalfields along the Sankey channel.
