= Jim C. Forbes =

Australian rules footballer, born 1908

Jim Forbes

Personal information
- Full name: Charles Melbourne Forbes
- Born: 26 December 1908; Prahran, Victoria
- Died: 13 November 1981 (aged 72); Prahran, Victoria
- Original team: South Yarra

Playing career^{1}
Years	Club	Games (Goals)
1930–32, 1934	St Kilda	19 (6)
1935–36	Brighton (VFA)	
- ^{1} Playing statistics correct to the end of 1936.

Charles Melbourne "Jim" Forbes (26 December 1908 – 13 November 1981) was an Australian rules footballer who played with St Kilda in the Victorian Football League (VFL).
