= James Forbes (hospital inspector) =

James Forbes, M.D. (1779–1837), was a Scottish inspector-general of army hospitals.

Forbes was born in Aberdeen in 1779, and received his general education at Marischal College there. He studied medicine at the University of Edinburgh, where he graduated with and MD. In 1803 he entered the army as assistant-surgeon to the 30th regiment, became surgeon to the 95th regiment in 1809, and staff-surgeon the same year. He was in the retreat from Corunna, and immediately after accompanied the expedition to Walcheren, where he was commended for his abilities and zeal during the disastrous prevalence of intermittent fever and other camp sickness. He then returned to service in the Peninsula, receiving the rank of physician to the forces. After the peace he was appointed to take charge of the large hospital erected at Colchester for the sick and wounded from the field of Waterloo. He then became successively superintendent of Chelsea Hospital and medical director at Chatham. In 1822 he returned to foreign service in the West Indies, Nova Scotia, and Canada.

In 1829 he was appointed principal medical officer in Ceylon, from which he returned in 1836 with his health broken by the climate. He was promoted to the rank of inspector-general of hospitals, and nominated to the chief direction of the army medical department in India, but was unable from ill-health to proceed to his post. He died at Maddox Street in London on 7 November 1837, aged 59, and was buried in Rochester Cathedral. No writings of his appear in library catalogues.
