= John Dalrymple (political writer) =

Scottish writer and Lord Provost of Edinburgh

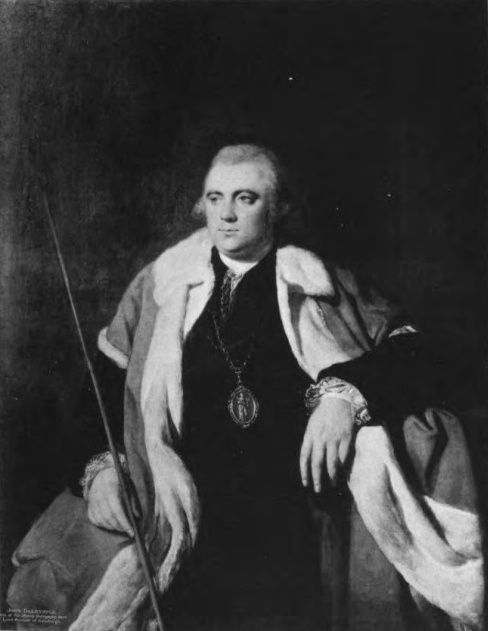
John Dalrymple, Lord Provost of Edinburgh 1770-2, 1777-8

John Dalrymple (1734–1779) was a Scottish writer who twice served as Lord Provost of Edinburgh (1770 and 1779).

He wrote numerous political tracts, among which Answers for the Right Honourable John Dalrymple, Lord Provost of the city of Edinburgh, and others; to the petition of James Stoddart, Esq; late old Provost, and James Stirling, Esq; late one of the bailies of said city, and others is the most widely preserved.

John Taylor of Caroline, in his Inquiry into the Principles and Policy of the Governments of the United States, noted that he had read a "book [...] written by a Sir John Dalrymple, an Englishman [sic], containing a proposition for a reunion between England and the United States, upon terms nearly similar to the constitution of Neuchattel" (p. 113).

He lived at Queen Street in Edinburgh's New Town.

He is buried in the Covenanters Prison section of Greyfriars Kirkyard.
