= 1796 in Great Britain =

Events from the year 1796 in Great Britain.

== Incumbents ==
- Monarch – George III
- Prime Minister – William Pitt the Younger (Tory)
- Foreign Secretary – Lord Grenville

== Events ==
- 23 January – troopship wrecked on Loe Bar, Cornwall, with loss of over 600 lives.
- 1 February – protests over the price of bread culminate in Queen Charlotte being hit by a stone as she and King George return from a trip to the theatre.
- 16 February – Britain takes control of Ceylon from the Batavian Republic following the previous day's peaceful surrender of Colombo to Major-General James Stuart, ending the Invasion of Ceylon (1795).
- 29 February – ratifications of the Jay Treaty between Great Britain and the United States are officially exchanged, bringing it into effect. Britain vacates the forts it has been retaining in the Great Lakes region.
- 14 May – Edward Jenner successfully administers the smallpox vaccine to James Phipps in Gloucestershire.
- 20 May – the last mock Garrat Elections are held in Surrey.
- 21 June – explorer Mungo Park becomes the first European to reach the Niger River.
- 9 August – opening to traffic of Wearmouth Bridge, designed by Rowland Burdon in cast iron. Its span of 237 feet (72 m) makes it the world's longest single-span vehicular bridge extant at this date.
- 19 August – by the Second Treaty of San Ildefonso, Spain and France form an alliance against Great Britain.
- 20 August – a meeting intended to be addressed by radical John Thelwall at Great Yarmouth is violently broken up by Royal Navy sailors.
- 22 September
  - Frigate HMS Amphion blows up while preparing for sea at Plymouth, killing 300 out of the 312 aboard.
  - Mary Lamb commits matricide in London.
- 5 October – Anglo-Spanish War: Spain declares war on Britain.
- December – the government begins work on a 40-acre (162,000 m^{2}) site at Norman Cross for the world's first purpose-built prisoner-of-war camp.
- 18 December – HMS Courageux is wrecked on the Barbary Coast with the loss of 464 of the 593 on board.
- Undated
  - Summer – Ribchester Hoard and helmet found in Lancashire.
  - Kendal Museum opened in Westmorland.
  - The Retreat established in York; it pioneers the humane treatment of people with mental disorders.
  - Last resident family leaves St Ninian's Isle.
  - Earliest known reference to the sea song Spanish Ladies.

=== Ongoing ===
- French Revolutionary Wars, First Coalition.

== Publications ==
- Fanny Burney's novel Camilla: or, A Picture of Youth.
- Mary Hays' epistolary novel Memoirs of Emma Courtney.
- The popular Gothic novels Matthew Lewis's The Monk and Regina Maria Roche's The Children of the Abbey.
- Samuel Ireland publishes a collection of Shakespearean forgeries in his Miscellaneous Papers and Legal Instruments Under the Hand and Seal of William Shakespeare (dated this year but actually issued on 24 December 1795). Edmond Malone exposes them in his An Inquiry into the Authenticity of Certain Miscellaneous Papers and Legal Instruments on 31 March, and the forged 'Shakespearean' play, Vortigern and Rowena, is able to sustain just a single performance at the Theatre Royal, Drury Lane, London, on 2 April. Ireland's son, William Henry, confesses to the fraud in An Authentic Account of the Shakespearean Manuscripts.
- The volume of The Scots Musical Museum published this year includes Robert Burns' versions of Auld Lang Syne and Charlie Is My Darling.

== Births ==
- 25 January – William MacGillivray, naturalist and ornithologist (died 1852)
- 10 February – Henry De la Beche, geologist (died 1855)
- 17 February – Frederick William Beechey, explorer (died 1856)
- March – Durham Ox, shorthorn bull (killed 1807)
- 27 June – George Vincent, painter (died 1831)
- 22 August – Baden Powell, mathematician (died 1860)
- 25 August – Edwin Beard Budding, inventor (died 1846)
- August – William Marsden, surgeon (died 1867)
- 4 September (bapt.) – Henry Foster, scientist (died 1831)
- 13 September – James Finlay Weir Johnston, chemist (died 1855)
- 14 September – Woodbine Parish, diplomat (died 1882)
- 9 October – Fitzroy Kelly, lawyer and Member of Parliament, last Chief Baron of the Exchequer (died 1880)
- 17 October – James Matheson, Member of Parliament (died 1878)
- December (approximate date) – William Banting, undertaker and dietician (died 1878)

== Deaths ==
- 12 February – John Hamilton, Member of Parliament (born 1715)
- 17 February – James Macpherson, Scottish poet, "translator" of Ossian (born 1736)
- 19 March
  - Hugh Palliser, naval officer and administrator (born 1722)
  - Stephen Storace, theatre composer (born 1762)
- 27 May – Lord Charles Townshend, Member of Parliament (born 1769)
- 16 July – George Howard, Army officer and politician (born 1718)
- 21 July – Robert Burns, national poet of Scotland (born 1759)
- 1 August – Robert Pigot, Army officer and Member of Parliament (born 1720)
- 6 August – David Allan, painter (born 1744)
- 12 August – Richard Beckford, member of parliament
- 1 September – David Murray, 2nd Earl of Mansfield, politician (born 1727)
- October – Thomas Christie, writer (born 1761)
- 12 December – William Wilson, Member of Parliament (born 1720)

== See also ==
- 1796 in Wales
- List of MPs elected in the British general election, 1796
