= 1769 in Great Britain =

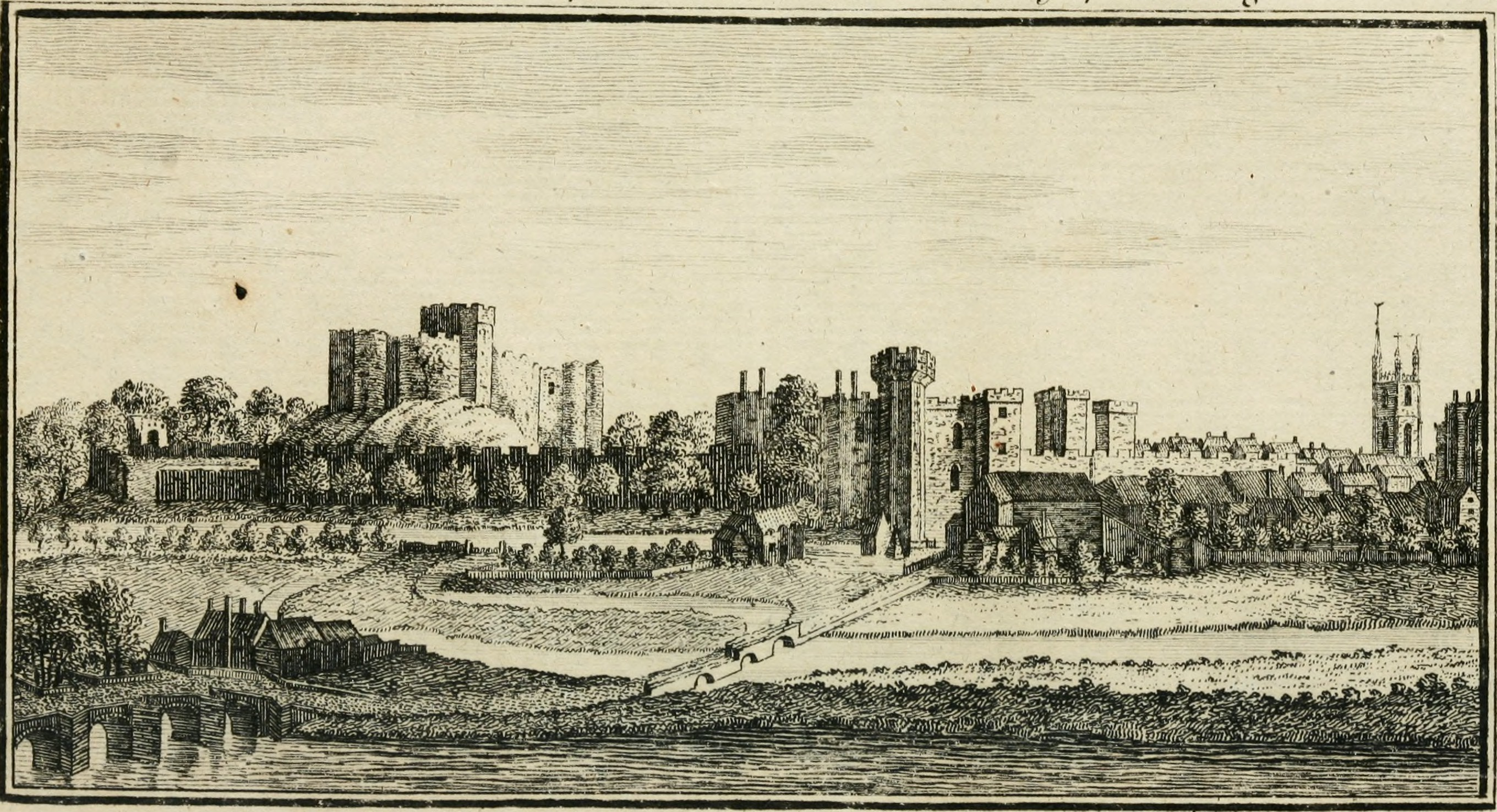

Events from the year 1769 in Great Britain. This year sees several key events in the Industrial Revolution.

== Incumbents ==
- Monarch – George III
- Prime Minister – Augustus FitzRoy, 3rd Duke of Grafton (Whig)

== Events ==
- 21 January – first of the Letters of Junius, criticising the government, appears in the Public Advertiser.
- February–April – John Wilkes is expelled from Parliament three times in the Middlesex election affair.
- 23 March – Augustus FitzRoy, 3rd Duke of Grafton, the Prime Minister, and his wife, Anne, are divorced; on 24 June the Duke remarries.
- 8 April – the Theatre Royal, York, reopens under this title having been granted a Royal Patent. (The manager, Tate Wilkinson, also obtains a patent for his theatre in Hull.)
- 13 April – first voyage of James Cook: James Cook arrives in Tahiti on the ship HM Bark Endeavour, preparing to observe the transit of the planet Venus, which takes place on 3 June. After the voyage, the data is found to be inaccurate in determining the distance between the Sun and Earth.
- 25 April–27 May – first Royal Academy summer exhibition held.
- 29 April – James Watt is granted a British patent for "A method of lessening the consumption of steam in steam engines" – the separate condenser, a key improvement (first devised by Watt in 1765) which stimulates the Industrial Revolution.
- 3 & 29 May – Eclipse runs his first races, giving rise to the phrase "Eclipse first and the rest nowhere."
- 13 June – Josiah Wedgwood opens his Etruria Works for the manufacture of pottery.
- 28 June – The Morning Chronicle newspaper begins publication in London.
- 3 July – Richard Arkwright patents a spinning frame able to weave fabric mechanically.
- 5–7 September – actor-manager David Garrick stages a Shakespeare Jubilee festival in Stratford-upon-Avon, disrupted by rain and with no performances of Shakespeare's works.
- 7 October – James Cook reaches New Zealand.
- 19 November – Blackfriars Bridge across the River Thames in London opens to traffic.

=== Undated ===
- Gordon's London dry gin first produced.
- Elizabeth Raffald's cookery book The Experienced English Housekeeper, published in Manchester, contains a recipe for "Bride Cake" covered in marzipan and royal icing that is recognisable as a modern wedding cake and the earliest printed recipe for crumpet.
- Work on Syon House, Middlesex, to the design of Robert Adam, ceases.
- Approximate date – Britannia metal is first produced, in Sheffield.

== Publications ==
- Authorized King James Version of the Bible in the Oxford standard text edited by Benjamin Blayney.
- Debrett's Peerage and Baronetage first published as The New Peerage.
- William Robertson's The History of the Reign of Charles V.

== Births ==
- 1 January – Jane Marcet, science writer (died 1858)
- 6 January – Lord Charles Townshend, Member of Parliament (died 1796)
- 2 March – Walter Fawkes, writer and Member of Parliament (died 1825)
- 4 March – Ellen Sharples, painter (died 1849)
- 23 March – William Smith, geologist and cartographer (died 1839)
- 3 April – Josiah Wedgwood II, Member of Parliament (died 1843)
- 5 April – Sir Thomas Hardy, 1st Baronet, naval officer (died 1839)
- 13 April – Thomas Lawrence, painter (died 1830)
- 14 April – William Rae, Member of Parliament (died 1842)
- 1 May – Arthur Wellesley, 1st Duke of Wellington, general and Prime Minister (died 1852)
- 2 May – John Malcolm, soldier, statesman and historian (died 1833)
- 21 May – John Hookham Frere, diplomat and author (died 1846)
- 18 June – Viscount Castlereagh, statesman, diplomat and soldier (suicide 1822)
- 14 August – Richard Barry, 7th Earl of Barrymore, noble (died 1793)
- 10 September – Charles Bullen, admiral (died 1853)
- 19 September – George Raper, naval officer and illustrator (died 1797)
- 28 September – John Jackson, boxer (died 1845)
- 6 October – Isaac Brock, general and administrator (died 1812)
- 23 October – James Ward, painter and engraver (died 1859)
- 7 November – William Sturges Bourne, politician (died 1845)
- 12 November – Amelia Opie, author (died 1853)
- 13 December – James Scarlett Abinger, judge (died 1844)
- 23 December
  - William Henry Clinton, general (died 1846)
  - Martin Archer Shee, portrait painter (died 1850)
- date unknown
  - Maria Bland, singer (died 1838)
  - James Dadford, English canal engineer (year of death unknown)
  - Charles Ewart, Scottish soldier (died 1846)
  - Francis Gore, officer and colonial administrator (died 1852)
  - Robert Hetrick, Scottish poet (died 1849)

== Deaths ==
- 25 February – Henry Flitcroft, architect (born 1697)
- 2 August – Daniel Finch, 8th Earl of Winchilsea, politician (born 1689)
- 19 August – Matthew Brettingham, architect (born 1699)
- 29 August – Edmond Hoyle, game expert (born 1672)

== See also ==
- 1769 in Wales
