= 1852 in the United Kingdom =

Events from the year 1852 in the United Kingdom.

== Incumbents ==
- Monarch – Victoria
- Prime Minister – Lord John Russell (Whig) (until 23 February); Edward Smith-Stanley, 14th Earl of Derby (Conservative) (starting 23 February, until 19 December); George Hamilton-Gordon, 4th Earl of Aberdeen (Coalition) (starting 19 December)

== Events ==
- January – New Model Union the Amalgamated Society of Engineers, Machinists, Smiths, Millwrights and Patternmakers involved in a 3-month lockout.
- 4 January – The wooden paddle steamer RMS Amazon catches fire and sinks on her maiden voyage in the Bay of Biscay with between 105 and 115 killed and 58 saved.
- 17 January – United Kingdom recognises the independence of the Transvaal.
- 3 February – The new chamber of the House of Commons of the United Kingdom in the Palace of Westminster, designed by Charles Barry and Augustus Pugin, is opened. Later this month, Pugin suffers a mental breakdown, days after designing the clock tower for the Palace, dying in September.
- 5 February – Holmfirth Flood caused by collapse of the embankment at Bilberry reservoir in the West Riding of Yorkshire: 81 killed.
- 11 February – The first British public toilet for women opens in Bedford Street, London. One for gentlemen had opened on 2 February in Fleet Street.
- 14 February – Great Ormond Street Hospital in London admits its first child patient.
- 21 February – Earl Russell resigns as Prime Minister after his Militia Bill is amended.
- 23 February – The Earl of Derby forms a minority Protectionist Conservative government.
- 25 February – HMS Birkenhead sinks near Cape Town, British Cape Colony. Only 193 of the 643 on board survive, after troops stand firm on the deck so as not to overwhelm the lifeboats containing women and children.
- 27 February – Lord Derby appoints Benjamin Disraeli as Chancellor of the Exchequer.
- 1 March – Archibald William Montgomerie, 13th Earl of Eglinton is appointed Lord Lieutenant of Ireland.
- April – Samuel Orchart Beeton begins publication of The Englishwoman's Domestic Magazine, the first for women.
- 1 April – Start of the Second Burmese War.
- 21 April – St George's Cathedral, Southwark, St Chad's Cathedral, Birmingham, Nottingham Cathedral and Salford Cathedral are raised to the dignity of cathedrals of the Roman Catholic church by decree of the Sacred Congregation for the Propagation of the Faith.
- May – The Museum of Manufactures, predecessor of the Victoria and Albert Museum, is opened in London, initially at Marlborough House.
- 21 June – The trial of Cardinal John Henry Newman for the defamation of Giacinto Achilli opens in London. Newman is convicted on 25 June.
- 29 June – Protestant-Catholic riots in Stockport.
- 30 June – Parliament passes:
  - New Zealand Constitution Act 1852, granting the British colony self-government with a representative constitution.
  - Common Law Procedure Act.
- July – The first Synod of the newly created Roman Catholic Archdiocese of Westminster is held at St Mary's College, Oscott, Birmingham.
- 7–31 July – General election: Lord Derby retains power.
- 23 August – George Jennings receives a patent for improvements to the flush toilet.
- 2 September – The public library in Campfield, Manchester, is the first to offer free lending under the Public Libraries Act 1850.
- 8 September – The Inman Line is the first to offer United States-bound migrants steerage passage in a steamer, SS City of Glasgow.
- 1 October – Patent Law Amendment Act comes into effect, merging the English, Scottish and Irish patent systems.
- 14 October – Great Northern Railway opens London King's Cross station, the largest in Europe at this time.
- 19 October – The last fatal duel on English soil takes place on Priest Hill, between Englefield Green and Old Windsor, between two French political exiles Emmanuel Barthélemy and Frederic Cournet. Cournet is killed; Barthélemy is tried for murder but convicted only of manslaughter and serves a few months in prison. He is hanged two years later after another killing.
- 1–30 November – Second-wettest month in the EWP series (wettest until 1903) with an average of 202.5 millimetres (7.97 in). It beats November 1772 with 200.8 millimetres (7.91 in).
- 18 November – The State Funeral of the Duke of Wellington takes place at St Paul's Cathedral
- 17 December – Earl of Derby resigns as Prime Minister, following the defeat of his budget.
- 28 December – Earl of Aberdeen becomes Prime Minister, leading a Whig-Peelite coalition.

=== Undated ===
- End of the Great Famine (Ireland). In the period it has lasted since 1845, one million people have emigrated from Ireland. The Irish now make up a quarter of the population of Liverpool, and the same is true of cities on the east coast of North America.
- The House of Mercy Anglican sisterhood (which becomes the Community of St John Baptist) is established at Clewer, near Windsor, to minister to reformed prostitutes and other marginalised women.
- Nailmakers' Strike in the West Midlands.

== Publications ==
- Charles Dickens' novel Bleak House (serialisation from March).
- Roget's Thesaurus (1st edition).
- William Makepeace Thackeray's novel The History of Henry Esmond.

== Births ==
- 18 April – George Clausen, graphic artist (died 1944)
- 4 May – Alice Liddell, inspiration for Alice's Adventures in Wonderland (died 1934)
- 24 May – Cunninghame Graham, politician, adventurer and writer (died 1936)
- 30 June – Reginald Brett, 2nd Viscount Esher, politician and courtier (died 1930)
- 4 July – E. S. Prior, Arts and Crafts architect and theorist (died 1932)
- 27 July – Edward Onslow Ford, sculptor (died 1901)
- 4 August – Charles Coborn, born Colin McCallum, music-hall singer (died 1945)
- 23 August – Arnold Toynbee, economic historian (died 1883)
- 9 September – John Henry Poynting, physicist (died 1914)
- 12 September – H. H. Asquith, Prime Minister of the United Kingdom (died 1928)
- 21 September – Edmund Leighton, historical genre painter (died 1922)
- 28 September – John French, World War I field marshal (died 1925)
- 30 September – Charles Villiers Stanford, Irish-born composer (died 1924)
- 2 October – William Ramsay, Scottish-born chemist, Nobel Prize laureate (died 1916)
- 3 October – Charles Cripps, lawyer and politician (died 1941)
- 17 October – George Egerton, admiral (died 1940)
- 21 December – George Callaghan, admiral (died 1920)

=== Full date unknown ===
- John Hawdon, British sculler
- Kate Vaughan, born Catherine Candelin, dancer and actress (died 1903)

== Deaths ==
- 1 January – John George Children, chemist, mineralogist and zoologist (born 1777)
- 10 February – Samuel Prout, painter (born 1783)
- 5 April – James Grant, major-general (born 1778)
- 3 May – Sara Coleridge, author and translator (born 1802)
- 2 June – William Forster Lloyd, economist (born 1794)
- 24 August – Sarah Guppy, inventor (born 1770)
- 4 September – William MacGillivray, naturalist and ornithologist (born 1796)
- 14 September
  - Augustus Pugin, architect and designer (born 1812)
  - Arthur Wellesley, 1st Duke of Wellington, general and Prime Minister of the United Kingdom (born 1769)
- 30 September – Mary Matilda Betham, diarist, scholar and poet (born 1776)
- 7 October – Sir Edward Troubridge, 2nd Baronet, admiral (born ca. 1787)
- 9 November – John Talbot, 16th Earl of Shrewsbury, peer and lay Roman Catholic leader (born 1791)
- 10 November – Gideon Mantell, geologist and palaeontologist (born 1790)
- 20 November – Mary Berry, writer (born 1763)
- 27 November – Ada Lovelace, early computer pioneer, daughter of Lord Byron (born 1815)
