= Winter of 1894–95 in the United Kingdom =

Period of cold weather in the UK

The winter of 1894–1895, also known as the Great Frost, was severe for the British Isles with a Central England temperature (CET) of 1.17 °C or 34.1 °F. Many climatologists have come to view this winter as the end of the Little Ice Age and the culmination of a decade of harsh winters in Britain. Whereas the average CET for the 10 winters from 1885–1886 to 1894–1895 was 2.87 °C or 37.2 °F, no winter with a CET under 3.0 °C or 37.4 °F followed for 22 years and no month as cold as February or January 1895 until 1940. In contrast, between 1659 and 1894, no spell with every winter CET above 3.0 °C or 37.4 °F had lasted longer than 12 winters.^{[b]}

This winter, which featured the lowest North Atlantic oscillation index between 1882 and 1962, with lower values recorded only in 1880/1881, 1962/1963, and 1968/1969 affected most of Europe and North America very severely. The severe winter led to mass unemployment and severe disruptions to shipping on the River Thames, which froze over. Most workers were left without sustenance, and in industrial centres, large soup kitchens were widespread to feed these people.

Numerous skating festivals also were organised to take advantage of the unusually cold and sunny weather, with up to 50,000 people skating on the Serpentine in London's Hyde Park and speed skating races being widely popular and generating money to be used for relief of the poor, and in some cases to provide them with temporary work as vendors for spectators.

Coal supplies dwindled as transporting coal by river was impossible, whilst many recently introduced exotic plants were killed by the cold.

== December 1894 ==
December 1894 was mild for the most part and the first three weeks were dominated by southwesterly winds, so much so that primroses and daisies were in bloom during the third week. During the last week, though, when the winds veered to the northwest, colder weather arrived with frosts and snow showers to exposed areas.

Seven inches (0.18 m) of snow were reported in Norfolk at the end of the month. The average monthly temperature over central England was 5.1 °C or 41.2 °F.

== January 1895 ==
Troughs in the flow gave snow showers to most parts and many places had a snow cover, and Oxford had 3 inches (0.08 m) by the 6th. High pressure to the west moved across the UK and under the clear skies and with a deep snow cover, very low minima were recorded with −11 °C (12.2 °F) in parts of Norfolk and −18 °C or −0.4 °F in parts of the Scottish Highlands. Freezing fog formed and was slow to clear, a maximum of −5 °C or 23 °F was recorded at Ross-on-Wye in freezing fog.

Milder air tried to push in from the Atlantic Ocean with a system and a heavy snowfall resulted across the UK, with depths of snow of 8 to 15 centimetres (3.1 to 5.9 in) being widely reported.

The Atlantic air finally broke through, and a thaw resulted in flooding in a number of areas, as temperatures rose double figures in the south, Kew recording 11 °C (51.8 °F).

The northwesterlies returned on the 21st with a low over the near continent and its active cold front moving across southeast England bringing thunderstorms, snow, and hail. The northerly flow for a few days and conditions were severe over northern Scotland with heavy drifting snow, and snow fell elsewhere exposed to the north wind. Thundersnow occurred widely on the 23rd with the passage of another strong frontal system.

The average monthly temperature was 0.2 °C or 32.4 °F, which is the 26th-coldest January ever recorded since 1659 and 16th-coldest since 1766 – though only 1940, 1963, and 1979 have been colder since. January 1895 had heavy snowfall produce above-average water-equivalent precipitation – England and Wales averaged 100.9 millimetres or 3.97 inches, which is more than in any colder month since the EWP series began – except in the west of Scotland, which was in a rain shadow from the prevailing northeasterly winds and received only a quarter of normal rainfall. Despite the heavy snowfall, sunshine duration was above normal throughout except for the east coast and adjacent slopes, with the west and southwest having up to twice their long-term average insolation.

== February 1895 ==
A very cold easterly flow controlled the weather over the UK and most of Europe, and severe frosts with minima of −13 °C or 8.6 °F occurred at Loughborough and −15 °C or 5.0 °F was recorded at Chester. Heavy snow showers came with the easterly with Yorkshire and Lincolnshire getting the brunt of the showers, South Shields was severely affected by 15 hours of continuous snowfall forcing the closure of the shipyard. Small polar lows affected the west with snowfalls, Douglas on the Isle of Man recorded 8 inches (0.20 m) of snow. However, away from the east coast, February 1895 was exceptionally dry and very sunny, with some southern areas recording no measurable precipitation and the England and Wales Precipitation value totaling only 11.1 millimetres or 0.44 inches of water equivalent – the sixth-driest February and equal 28th-driest any month since the series begin in 1766. Over 150 hours of sunshine were reported from Jersey, over 110 hours from Sussex and Hampshire, and around 80 hours in the north, figures that in the south rival February 2008 as the sunniest on record.

As the high over Scandinavia moved over the UK; a phenomenally cold and dry spell with exceptionally low minima followed. Temperatures of −20 °C or −4 °F or less were regularly recorded, −27.2 °C or −17.0 °F was recorded at Braemar on the 11th, the lowest-ever UK minimum, −24 °C or −11.2 °F at Buxton also on the 11th, −22.2 °C or −8.0 °F in Rutland. −12.7 °C or 9.1 °F was the mean average temperature for Wakefield in Yorkshire between the 5th and the 14th. Canals, rivers, lakes and ponds froze in the severe cold, the Manchester Ship Canal was iced over, ice floes were in the Thames, and the Thames estuary itself was impassable because of ice.

An estimated 50,000 to 60,000 people skated on the Serpentino yesterday. The thickness of the ice averaged 6½ inches.... In Finsbury Park the ice in places was no less than 10 inches (25 cm) thick.

Many people died of hypothermia or respiratory conditions.

... coroner for East London, held inquests at Poplar on the bodies of four persons whose death was due to the cold weather. At St. Clement Dane’s Vestry-hall, at the Westminster Union, at Chelsea Town Hall, and at the old Kensington Town Hall, similar cases were investigated.... Out of eight inquests ... five were stated by the medical witnesses to be due to the severity of the weather.

By the end of February, the weekly death rate from pneumonia and related illnesses was 950 per week higher than the average for the period.

The lack of snow meant that frost penetrated unusually deep into soils throughout southern England. Gas and water pipes fractured, creating major supply problems: Northampton was blackened out when the worst of these fractures cut out the town's gas supply, whilst heaving from the frost made most major roads and railways impassable.

Record minima were set for these dates in February 1895:

- 7th: −21.7 °C or −7.1 °F
- 8th: −25.0 °C or −13.0 °F
- 9th: −23.9 °C or −11.0 °F
- 10th: −25.6 °C or −14.1 °F
- 11th: −27.2 °C or −17.0 °F
- 12th: −20.6 °C or −5.1 °F
- 13th: −21.9 °C or −7.4 °F
- 14th: −21.7 °C or −7.1 °F
- 16th: −23.9 °C or −11.0 °F
- 17th: −23.9 °C or −11.0 °F
- 18th: −23.9 °C or −11.0 °F
- 19th: −22.2 °C or −8.0 °F

The average monthly temperature was −1.8 °C or 28.8 °F, the second-coldest February ever recorded, whilst the minimum temperature with the clear skies of −5.1 °C or 22.8 °F is the lowest for any month since records began in 1878.

In the rural village of Ballyknockan in the Wicklow Mountains in Ireland, the end of February 1895 brought severe snowstorms:

There was a man named Ned Artery who died at the beginning of the storm. He had to be waked for three days and three nights. On the fourth day, the storm ceased and a few of the strong men brought him over three miles to the cemetery and buried him there. No sooner was he buried than the storm arose and overtook the men and they had to take shelter with the neighbours. Some of the people had up to twenty guests in their house with them, who could not get home for three or four weeks... The storm will also be remembered for many years because a lot of sheep-men had great hardship trying to save their sheep. The men would get a long pole and run in down through the drifts for 14 to 20 feet deep and the dogs would smell down and if there was a sheep in the drift the dogs would scratch the snow to give warning to their masters... This storm lasted from February to June on the hollows of the high mountains, and for six weeks on low land.

== Thaw ==
As the high began to slip westwards, milder Atlantic air slowly encroached and temperatures crept above freezing for the first time in a few weeks; London had its first frost-free night on the 21st for three weeks. Maxima were finally returning to close to normal by the end of the month. March 1895, however, had another cold snap during the first week with heavier snow showers than observed during the coldest periods four weeks beforehand, but a more permanent thaw took place from the second week without major flooding.

== Coldest spells of the winter (CET means) ==
- Coldest daily CET maximum: −4.5 °C or 23.9 °F 6 February
- Coldest daily CET minimum: −13.5 °C or 7.7 °F 8 February
- Mildest daily CET maximum: 11.2 °C or 52.2 °F on 13 December

== Notes ==
^{b} The longest previous spell of winters above 3.0 °C or 37.4 °F had been from 1716/1717 to 1727/1728.
