= 1762 in Great Britain =

Events from the year 1762 in Great Britain.

== Incumbents ==
- Monarch – George III
- Prime Minister – Thomas Pelham-Holles, 1st Duke of Newcastle (Whig) (until 26 May); John Stuart, 3rd Earl of Bute (Tory) (starting 26 May)

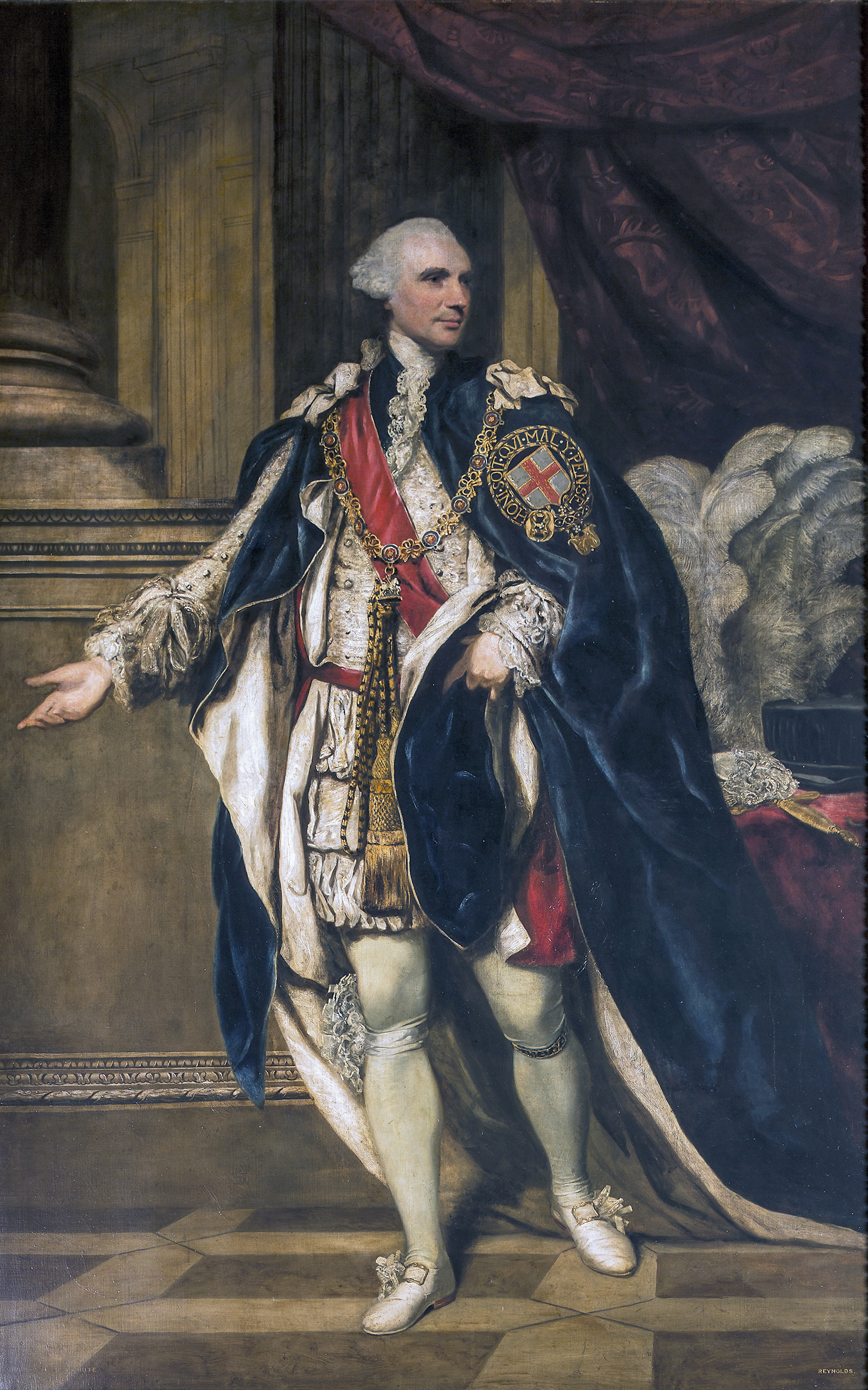
John Stuart, 3rd Earl of Bute

== Events ==
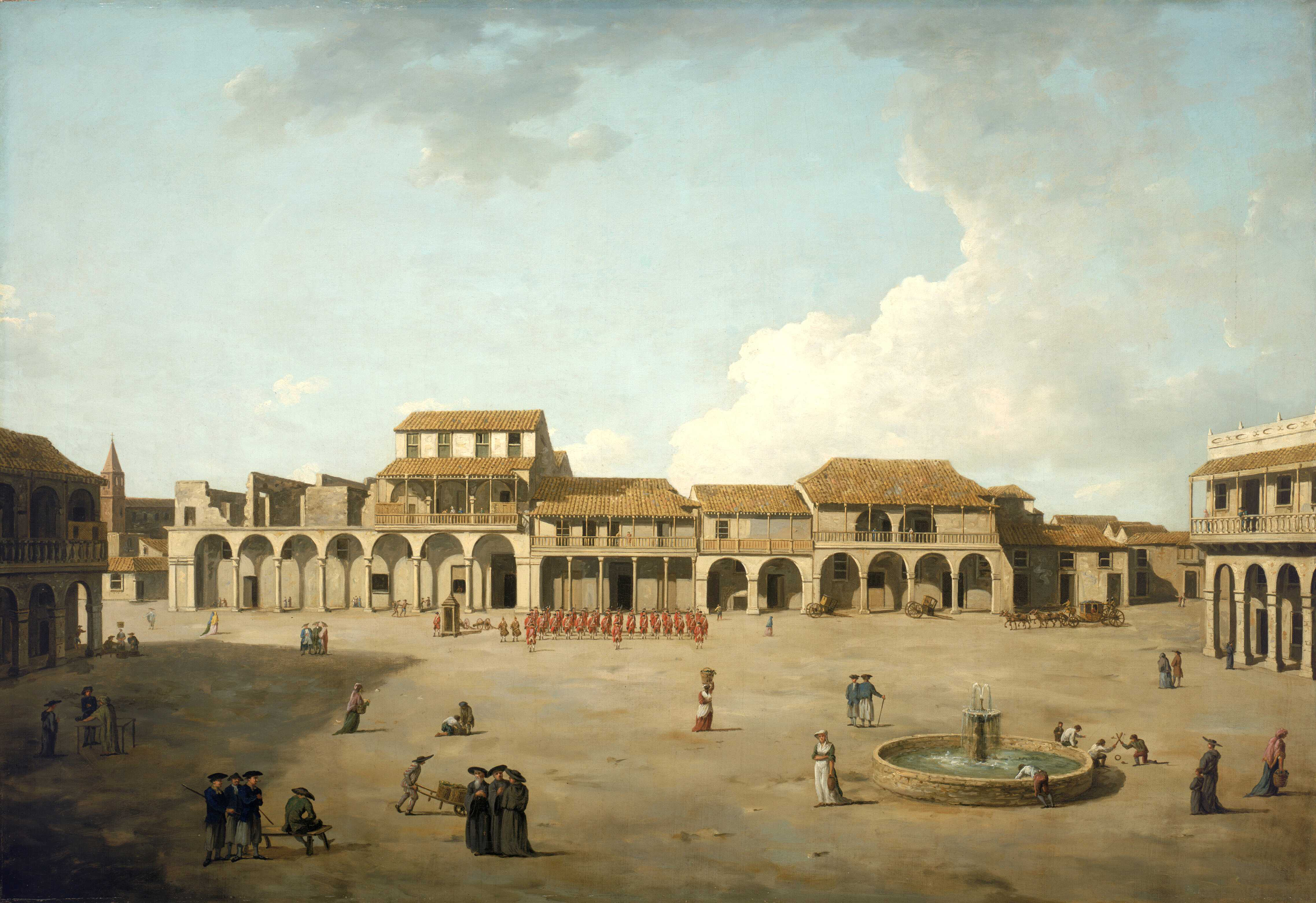
The Piazza at Havana by Dominic Serres. British forces captured Havana in August.

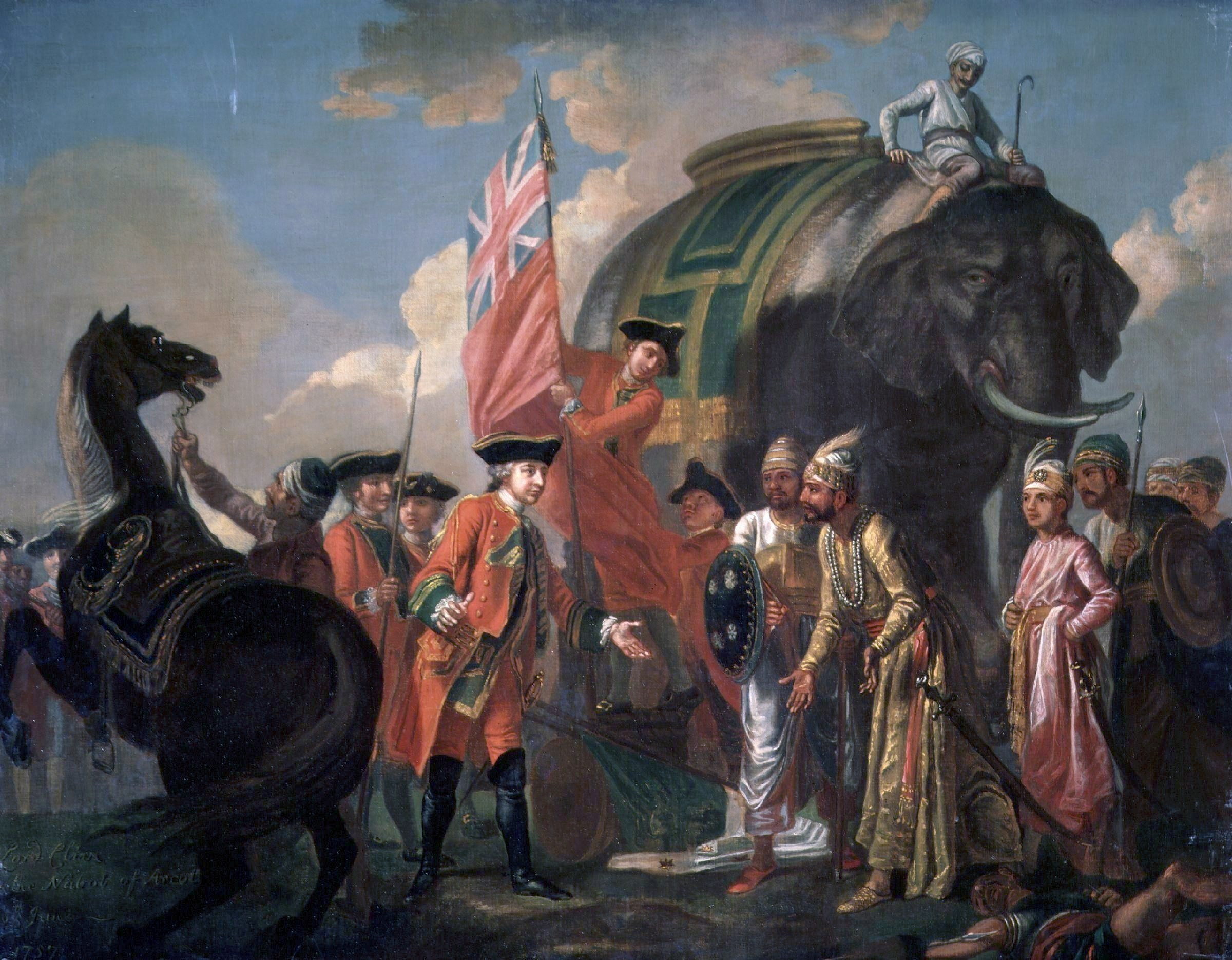
British East India Company seizes Manila.

- January – the "Cock Lane ghost" appears in London.
- 4 January – Britain declares war on Spain and Naples.
- February – 12 sperm whales strand on the east coast of England.
- 10 March – Seven Years' War – Britain captures Grenada from France.
- 20 March – debut performance of David Garrick's The Farmer's Return from London at the Theatre Royal in Drury Lane.
- 23 March – first legitimately constituted Sandemanian congregation in England, at Glover's Hall in London, as an offshoot of the Scottish Glasite sect.
- May – Thomas Pelham-Holles, 1st Duke of Newcastle-upon-Tyne resigns and is succeeded as Prime Minister by John Stuart, 3rd Earl of Bute, the first Scottish Prime Minister of Great Britain; a large number of Newcastle's 'Old Corps Whig' followers are dismissed from public office in the following months in what is known facetiously as the "Massacre of the Pelhamite Innocents".
- 17 May – The Exhibition of 1762 is staged by the Society of Artists of Great Britain at Pall Mall in London
- 22 May – royal family first takes up residence at Buckingham House.
- 5 June – John Wilkes founds the radical newspaper The North Briton.
- 24 June – Seven Years' War: At the Battle of Wilhelmsthal, the Anglo-Hanoverian army of Ferdinand of Brunswick defeats the French forces in Westphalia. The British commander Lord Granby distinguishes himself.
- mid-July–24 November – Seven Years' War: British troops reinforce the Portuguese to resist the Invasion of Portugal by Spain.
- 13 August – Seven Years' War: The Battle of Havana concludes after more than two months with the surrender of Havana to Britain by Spain.
- September – Society for Equitable Assurances on Lives and Survivorships is founded in London. The world's oldest mutual insurer, it pioneers age-based premiums based on the mortality rate.
- 15 September – French and Indian War – Battle of Signal Hill – British troops defeat the French in the last battle of the North American theatre of the Seven Years' War, fought in the Newfoundland Colony.
- 24 September–6 October – Seven Years' War: Battle of Manila fought between Great Britain and Spain resulting in the British occupation of the Philippines until 1764. The British take Manila and make it an Open Port.
- November – first recorded mention of the sandwich.
- 25 December – Francis Baring is released from his apprenticeship and with his brothers forms the partnership in London that becomes Barings Bank.

=== Undated ===
- Admiral John Ross of Balnagowan Castle initiates land tenure reform in the Scottish Highlands which will evolve into the Highland Clearances.
- Building of the Plymouth Synagogue, the oldest built by Ashkenazi Jews in the English-speaking world.
- The last remaining buildings are cleared from London Bridge.
- Composer Johann Christian Bach arrives in London where he will spend the remaining 20 years of his life.
- Maling pottery is founded, initially at North Hylton on Wearside.

== Publications ==
- William Williams Pantycelyn's Mor o Wydr (including "Gweddi am Nerth i fyned trwy anialwch y Byd", the Welsh original of the hymn "Cwm Rhondda").
- Laurence Sterne's collected sermons The Sermons of Mr. Yorick.
- James Stuart and Nicholas Revett's architectural treatise Antiquities of Athens.

== Births ==
- 31 January – Lachlan Macquarie, Scottish-born British Army officer and Governor of New South Wales (died 1824)
- 12 February – Solomon Hirschell, chief rabbi of the United Kingdom (died 1842)
- 17 March (bapt.) – William Dawes, Royal Marines officer and colonial administrator (died 1836)
- 12 August – King George IV of the United Kingdom (died 1830)
- 11 September – Joanna Baillie, Scottish-born poet and dramatist (died 1851)
- 24 September – William Lisle Bowles, poet and critic (died 1850)
- 21 October – George Colman the Younger, dramatist and miscellaneous writer (died 1836)
- 1 November – Spencer Perceval, Prime Minister of the United Kingdom (assassinated 1812)

== Deaths ==
- 3 February – Beau Nash, dandy (born 1674)
- 23 June – Charles Cornwallis, 1st Earl Cornwallis (born 1700)
- 13 July – James Bradley, English Astronomer Royal (born 1693)
- 28 July – George Dodington, 1st Baron Melcombe, English politician (born 1691)
- 21 August – Lady Mary Wortley Montagu, English writer (born 1689)

== See also ==
- 1762 in Wales
