= 1791 in Great Britain =

Events from the year 1791 in Great Britain.

== Incumbents ==
- Monarch – George III
- Prime Minister – William Pitt the Younger (Tory)
- Foreign Secretary – Francis Osborne, 5th Duke of Leeds (until May) Lord Grenville (starting 8 June)

== Events ==
- 1 January – Austrian composer Joseph Haydn arrives in England where his concerts are huge successes. On 8 July he is awarded an honorary doctorate of music at the University of Oxford.
- April – William Wilberforce introduces a bill to Parliament to abolish the slave trade but it is defeated.
- 10 June – royal assent for:
  - Constitutional Act, splitting the old province of Quebec into Upper and Lower Canada.
  - Roman Catholic Relief Act, relieving Catholics of certain political, educational and economic disabilities.
- 14–17 July – the Priestley Riots in Birmingham, against Dissenters.
- 21 June – foundation of the Ordnance Survey to undertake official mapping.
- 27 August – Battle of Tellicherry (Third Anglo-Mysore War) off the south-west coast of India: a Royal Navy patrol forces a French convoy bound for Mysore to surrender.
- 29 September – the King's son Prince Frederick, Duke of York, marries Princess Frederica Charlotte of Prussia at Charlottenburg.
- 4 December – the first issue of The Observer, the world's first Sunday newspaper, is published.

=== Undated ===
- Architect John Soane begins reconstruction of the Bank of England in London.
- Theophilus Lindsey and John Disney set up the "first organized denominational Unitarian society", The Unitarian Society for Promoting Christian Knowledge and the Practice of Virtue by the Distribution of Books ('Unitarian Book Society').
- The School for the Indigent Blind, the oldest specialist school of its kind in Britain, is founded in Liverpool by blind ex-merchant seaman, writer and abolitionist Edward Rushton.
- Amateur geologist William Gregor discovers an unknown metal in Cornwall later identified to be Titanium.

== Publications ==
- 13 March – Thomas Paine's chief work Rights of Man (first part).
- 16 May – James Boswell's landmark biography Life of Samuel Johnson.
- Thomas Sheraton's The Cabinet Maker and Upholsterer's Drawing-Book begins publication.
- Sir John Sinclair's Statistical Account of Scotland begins publication, introducing the term Statistics into English.

== Births ==
- 2 February – William Elford Leach, zoologist and marine biologist (d. 1836)
- 10 February – Henry Hart Milman, historian and ecclesiastic (died 1868)
- 21 February – John Mercer, English chemist and industrialist (died 1866)
- 15 March – Lewis Vulliamy, architect (died 1871)
- 18 March – John Talbot, 16th Earl of Shrewsbury, peer and lay Roman Catholic leader (died 1852)
- 3 April – Anne Lister, landowner, diarist, mountaineer and traveller, "the first modern lesbian" (died 1840)
- 12 April – Provo Wallis, Admiral of the Fleet (died 1892)
- 17 April (bapt.) – William Cubitt, building and civil engineering contractor and politician (died 1863)
- 5 July – Samuel Bailey, philosopher and author (died 1870)
- 4 September – Robert Knox, Scottish-born surgeon, anatomist and zoologist (died 1862)
- 13 September – William Betty, child actor (died 1874)
- 22 September – Michael Faraday, scientist (died 1867)
- 29 October – John Elliotson, physician (died 1868)
- 26 December – Charles Babbage, mathematician and inventor (died 1871)

== Deaths ==
- 11 January – William Williams Pantycelyn, Welsh hymnist (born 1717)
- 25 January – George Augustus Selwyn, Member of Parliament (born 1719)
- 5 February – John Beard, operatic tenor and actor-manager (born c. 1716/17)
- 2 March – John Wesley, founder of Methodism (born 1703)
- 29 March – Elspeth Buchan, Scottish millenarian prophet (born c. 1738)
- 19 April – Richard Price, Welsh-born philosopher (born 1723)
- 5 June – Frederick Haldimand, colonial governor (born 1718 in Switzerland)
- 12 June – Francis Grose, antiquary and lexicographer (born c. 1730)
- 17 June – Selina Hastings, Countess of Huntingdon, Methodist leader (born 1707)
- 12 August – Isabella Young, operatic mezzo-soprano and organist
- 16 November – Edward Penny, portrait and historical painter (born 1714)
- 27 December – John Monro, physician of Bethlem Hospital (born 1716)

== See also ==
- 1791 in Wales
