= England and Wales Precipitation =

Historical meteorological dataset

The England and Wales Precipitation (EWP) record is a historical meteorological dataset which was originally published in the journal British Rainfall in 1931 and updated in a greatly revised form by a number of climatologists including Janice Lough, Tom Wigley and Phil Jones during the 1970s and 1980s. The monthly mean rainfall and snowfall for the region of England and Wales are given (in millimetres) from the year 1766 to the present, though the original 1931 dataset went as far back as 1727.

== Data quality ==
The England and Wales Precipitation series for its earlier years was based on the work of amateur observers whose observations were collected by George James Symons in British Rainfall and analysed extensively in 1931 to form a monthly series as far back as 1727. Detailed analysis during the early 1980s showed by use of principal component analysis that England and Wales could be climatologically divided into five regions corresponding closely to present-day meteorological divisions; however, because of the absence of data from South West England between 1813 and 1816 and from North West England before 1766, the modern series begins in January 1766. Separate data for each region of England go back only to 1873.

Recent analysis suggests that the sparse data (besides the absence of data from South West England for four years, only one station was used per region until the 1820s) from early years can lead to bias towards drier conditions since higher and wetter areas are not likely to be accounted for, though no effort has yet been made to examine the data. There has also been a suggestion that many of the very earliest values, before circa 1780 and for a few years near 1800 and between 1809 and 1813, are rather too low compared to other estimates from A.F. Jenkinson of the University of East Anglia.

== Trends revealed by the series ==
Research into the EWP series since it was compiled have revealed that, overall, annual rainfall has not changed significantly despite some suggestions of a rising trend, but that winter half-year rainfall has substantially increased especially in the more northerly areas of England. Up to 2000, summer rainfall, especially in July and August, over the southern parts of England, showed a substantial decline; however, the very wet summers of 2007 and 2012 may suggest this is not a permanent change. Nonetheless, it is known that the maximum in rainfall during autumn (typical of high latitude maritime climates) has moved towards a later date since the 1960s, especially compared to the 1890s.

== Extrema ==
Taking the 247-year period for the series as a whole:

=== Wettest ===
Period	Record	Year
January	185.5 mm (7.30 in)	2014
February	169.6 mm (6.68 in)	2020
March	177.5 mm (6.99 in)	1947
April	149.9 mm (5.90 in)	2012
May	151.8 mm (5.98 in)	1773
June	160.1 mm (6.30 in)	2012
July	182.6 mm (7.19 in)	1828
August	192.9 mm (7.59 in)	1912
September	189.5 mm (7.46 in)	1918
October	218.1 mm (8.59 in)	1903
November	202.0 mm (7.95 in)	1852
December	193.9 mm (7.63 in)	1876
Spring (March to May)	363.0 mm (14.29 in)	1782
Summer (June to August)	409.7 mm (16.13 in)	1912
Autumn (September to November)	502.7 mm (19.79 in)	2000
Winter (December to February)	455.1 mm (17.92 in)	2013/2014
Year (January to December)	1,284.9 mm (50.59 in)	1872
Year (July to June)	1,258.3 mm (49.54 in)	2000/2001

- Apart from the record wet October and November, the only other month with over 200 millimetres has been November 1770 with 200.8 millimetres (7.91 in).
- The wettest two consecutive months were August and September 1799 with 378.9 millimetres (14.92 in).
- The wettest three consecutive months were October to December 2000 with 512.3 millimetres (20.17 in); the only other non-overlapping period to reach 500 mm (20 in) being November 1929 to January 1930 with 500.0 millimetres (19.69 in).
- The wettest four consecutive months were September to December 2000 with 644.9 millimetres (25.39 in); the only other non-overlapping period over 600 millimetres (24 in) being October 1929 to January 1930 with 624.3 millimetres (24.58 in).
- The wettest six consecutive months is from September 2000 to February 2001 with 834.6 millimetres (32.86 in). The next wettest (non-overlapping) have been August 1852 to January 1853 with 811.1 millimetres (31.93 in), July to December 1960 with 786.9 millimetres (30.98 in) and September 2019 to February 2020 with 784.9 millimetres (30.90 in).
- The wettest twelve consecutive months were from April 2000 to March 2001 with 1,355.5 millimetres (53.37 in). April 2012 to March 2013 has had a total precipitation of 1,332.1 millimetres (52.44 in); no other period has had more than the record wet calendar year of 1872, though September 1876 to August 1877 received 1,282.9 millimetres (50.51 in).
- The wettest twenty-four consecutive months have been from May 1999 to April 2001 with an annual average of 1,170.4 millimetres (46.08 in) over two years. The period from October 1929 to September 1931 had an annual average of 1,146.2 millimetres (45.13 in), that from June 1875 to May 1877 1,140.2 millimetres (44.89 in), and April 1993 to March 1995 averaged 1,128 millimetres (44.4 in) per annum.
- The wettest thirty-six month period is from September 1876 to August 1879 with an annual average of 1,140.9 millimetres (44.92 in) over three years, followed by April 1998 to March 2001 with an annual average of 1,132.7 millimetres (44.59 in) per twelve months.

=== Driest ===
Period	Record	Year
January	4.4 mm (0.17 in)	1766
February	3.6 mm (0.14 in)	1891
March	5.6 mm (0.22 in)	1781
April	7.1 mm (0.28 in)	1938
May	7.9 mm (0.31 in)	1844
June	4.3 mm (0.17 in)	1925
July	8.2 mm (0.32 in)	1825
August	9.1 mm (0.36 in)	1995
September	8.0 mm (0.31 in)	1959
October	8.8 mm (0.35 in)	1781
November	17.0 mm (0.67 in)	1945
December	8.9 mm (0.35 in)	1788
Spring (March to May)	54.8 mm (2.16 in)	1785
Summer (June to August)	66.9 mm (2.63 in)	1995
Autumn (September to November)	128.6 mm (5.06 in)	1978
Winter (December to February)	88.9 mm (3.50 in)	1963/1964
Year (January to December)	612.0 mm (24.09 in)	1788
Year (July to June)	558.7 mm (22.00 in)	1784/1785

- The driest consecutive months were March and April 1938 with just 23.6 millimetres (0.93 in) in total. April and May 1844 with 24.5 millimetres (0.96 in) are the only other consecutive months receiving under 25.4 millimetres (1 in).
- The driest three consecutive months were January to March 1779 with only 44.4 millimetres (1.75 in) in total. No other three-month period has ever received less than 50.8 millimetres (2 in).
- The driest four consecutive months were February to May 1785 with only 89.7 millimetres (3.53 in); no other non-overlapping period has under 110 millimetres (4.3 in).
- The driest six consecutive months were from January to June 1785 with 185.4 millimetres (7.30 in), closely followed by February to July 1921 with 188.1 millimetres (7.41 in) and March to August 1976 with 203.1 millimetres (8.00 in).
- The driest twelve consecutive months were from August 1784 to July 1785 with 522.1 millimetres (20.56 in), standing as much as 44.2 millimetres (1.74 in) below the next lowest from September 1975 to August 1976. The only other non-overlapping twelve-month period drier than the record dry calendar year of 1788 was from February 1854 to January 1855 when 606.7 millimetres (23.89 in) was registered, whilst November 1780 to October 1781 recorded only 613.8 millimetres (24.17 in).
- The driest twenty-four consecutive months, illustrating the extraordinary nature of the 1784/1785 drought, was from August 1784 to July 1786 with an annual average over two years of 692.8 millimetres (27.28 in). The only other non-overlapping twenty-four months to average under 700 millimetres (28 in) per annum were from October 1853 to September 1855 which averaged 697.2 millimetres (27.45 in), and from May 1995 to April 1997 which averaged 699.7 millimetres (27.55 in).
- The driest thirty-six consecutive months are from August 1853 to July 1856 with an annual average of 750.8 millimetres (29.56 in), very closely followed by October 1783 to September 1786 with an annual average of 751.2 millimetres (29.57 in), and April 1805 to March 1808 averaging 760.4 millimetres (29.94 in) per annum.

== See also ==
- Climate of the United Kingdom
- Central England Temperature
