= John Hawdon =

John Hawdon may refer to:

- John Hawdon (sculler)
- John Hawdon (colonial settler)
