= 1717 in Great Britain =

Events from the year 1717 in Great Britain.

== Incumbents ==
- Monarch – George I
- Regent – George, Prince of Wales (until 18 January)

== Events ==
- 1 January – Count Carl Gyllenborg, the Swedish ambassador, is arrested in London over a plot to assist the Pretender James Francis Edward Stuart.
- 4 January – Britain, the Dutch Republic and France sign the Triple Alliance.
- 24 January – William Thompson becomes Solicitor General.
- February – as part of the treaty between France and Britain, James Stuart leaves France and seeks refuge with the Pope.
- 2 March – dancer John Weaver performs in the first ballet in Britain, shown at the Theatre Royal, Drury Lane, The Loves of Mars and Venus.
- 31 March – Benjamin Hoadly, Bishop of Bangor, extends the Bangorian Controversy by delivering a sermon to, and supposedly at the request of, King George on The Nature of the Kingdom of Christ with the text "My kingdom is not of this world" (John 18:36), concluding there is no Biblical justification for church government.
- 10 April – following the dismissal of his ally Lord Townshend, Robert Walpole resigns from the government. This begins the Whig Split which lasts until 1720.
- 12 April – writer and politician Joseph Addison is appointed Southern Secretary in the remodelled government now dominated by James Stanhoe.
- 24 June – Grand Lodge of London and Westminster, the first Freemasonic Grand Lodge (the later United Grand Lodge of England), is founded.
- 1 July – Robert Harley, Earl of Oxford, is acquitted of conspiracy with the French to put the Pretender on the throne.
- 17 July – George Frideric Handel's Water Music performed on a barge on the River Thames for King George I.
- July – Indemnity Act frees most Jacobites from imprisonment.
- August – Handel becomes house composer at Cannons.
- 21 September – the first known Druid revival ceremony is held by John Toland at Primrose Hill, in London, at the Autumnal Equinox, to found the Mother Grove, which is later to become the Ancient Order of Druids.
- November – a rift between the King and his son the Prince of Wales leads to the latter with his wife being banished from the royal household but not allowed to take their children with them. The Prince now sides with the Opposition Whigs.
- 6 December – Colley Cibber's play The Non-Juror premieres at Drury Lane. Strongly anti-Jacobite, it is a popular success.
- The King ceases to attend meetings of the Cabinet regularly.
- Thomas Fairchild, a nurseryman at Hoxton in the East End of London, becomes the first person to produce a successful scientific plant hybrid, Dianthus Caryophyllus barbatus, known as "Fairchild's Mule".
- The Board of Ordnance establishes an Officer Corps of Engineers within the British Army, the immediate predecessor of the Royal Engineers.
- Kentish Post newspaper begins publication in Canterbury.

== Births ==
- 2 January – Edward Seymour, 9th Duke of Somerset, son of Edward Seymour, 8th Duke of Somerset and Mary Webb (died 1792)
- 5 January – William Barrington, 2nd Viscount Barrington, statesman (died 1793)
- 23 January – Benjamin Beddome, Baptist minister and hymnist (died 1795)
- 29 January – Jeffrey Amherst, 1st Baron Amherst, soldier and conqueror of Quebec (died 1797)
- c. 11 February – William Williams Pantycelyn, Welsh hymn writer (died 1791)
- 19 February – David Garrick, actor (died 1779)
- 5 June – Emanuel Mendes da Costa, botanist (died 1791)
- 28 June – Matthew Stewart, Scottish mathematician (died 1785)
- 15 August – John Metcalf, roadbuilder (died 1810)
- 4 September – Job Orton, dissenting minister (died 1783)
- 24 September – Horace Walpole, 4th Earl of Orford, writer (died 1797)
- 28 September – William Nassau de Zuylestein, 4th Earl of Rochford, diplomat and statesman (died 1781)
- c. October – James Paine, architect (died 1789)
- 30 October – Jonathan Hornblower, pioneer of steam power (died 1780)
- 13 November – Prince George William, member of the Royal Family (died 1718)
- 17 November – Caroline Townshend, 1st Baroness Greenwich, peeress (died 1794)
- 16 December – Elizabeth Carter, writer (died 1806)
- 25 December – George Augustus Eliott, 1st Baron Heathfield (died 1790)

== Deaths ==
- 8 March – Abraham Darby I, first of that name of three generations of a Quaker family that was key to the development of the Industrial Revolution (born 1678)
- 19 March – John Campbell, 1st Earl of Breadalbane and Holland, royalist (born 1636)
- 20 May – John Trevor, Speaker of the House of Commons (born 1637)
- August
  - William Blathwayt, civil servant and politician (born c. 1649)
  - William Cochrane, MP (year of birth unknown, after 1659)
- 30 August – William Lloyd, bishop (born 1627)
- 17 September – Robert Cotton, politician (born 1644)
- 26 October – Catherine Sedley, Countess of Dorchester, mistress of James II of England (born 1657)
- 26 November – Daniel Purcell, English composer (born 1664)
- 4 December – William Hamilton, surgeon in the British East India Company (year of birth unknown)
- 5 December – Richard Onslow, 1st Baron Onslow, politician (born 1654)

=== Unknown dates ===
- Jane Wiseman, actress, poet and playwright (born c. 1682)
- William Diaper, poet of the Augustan era (born 1685)
- William Boyd, 3rd Earl of Kilmarnock, nobleman (year of birth unknown)

== See also ==
- 1717 in Wales
