= 1793 in Great Britain =

Events from the year 1793 in Great Britain.

== Incumbents ==
- Monarch – George III
- Prime Minister – William Pitt the Younger (Tory)
- Foreign Secretary – Lord Grenville

== Events ==
- 1 February – French Revolutionary Wars: The French First Republic declares war on Britain, the Dutch Republic and (soon afterwards) Spain.
- 8 April – Acts of Parliament (Commencement) Act 1793: From this date, Acts are to be endorsed with the date of royal assent and will come into force on that date unless otherwise specified within; this overturns the previous convention that Acts come into force retrospectively at the date of commencement of the current Parliamentary session.
- 13 April
  - The Bank of England issues the first £5 note.
  - Manchester Penny Post launched, the first such service in the English provinces.
- May – Bennelong and Yemmerrawanne become the first Aboriginal Australians to visit Britain, landing at Falmouth, Cornwall, with Arthur Phillip.
- June – the Macartney Embassy, a diplomatic mission to China led by George Macartney, 1st Earl Macartney, reaches Canton, but will be rebuffed by the Qianlong Emperor.
- 20 July – Scottish explorer Alexander Mackenzie's 1792–1793 Peace River expedition to the Pacific Ocean reaches its goal at Bella Coola, British Columbia, making him the first known person to complete a transcontinental crossing of northern North America.
- 23 August – the Board of Agriculture is established.
- 12 September – Horatio Nelson, 1st Viscount Nelson meets Emma, Lady Hamilton in Naples.
- 18 September–18 December – French Revolutionary Wars: Siege of Toulon – Admiral Hood's squadron of Royal Navy ships supporting French Royalists is forced to withdraw from Toulon after a successful siege by Napoleon, taking a number of French ships – including the Lutine – with them.
- 20 September – British troops from Jamaica land on the island of Saint-Domingue to join the Haitian Revolution in opposition to the French Republic and its newly freed slaves; on 22 September the main French naval base on the island surrenders peacefully to the Royal Navy.
- 30 September – Bristol Bridge Riot against tolls: 11 people killed and 45 injured.
- 5 October – French Revolutionary Wars: Raid on Genoa – the Royal Navy boards and captures French warships sheltering in the neutral port of Genoa.
- 16 November – Catholic seminarians forced to leave the English College, Douai, settle at St Edmund's College, Ware, Hertfordshire.

=== Undated ===
- Westminster Quarters first written, for the bells of a new clock at the Church of St Mary the Great, Cambridge, by Prof. Joseph Jowett, probably with Prof. John Randall or William Crotch.
- Lansdown Crescent, Bath, designed by John Palmer, is completed.
- Physician Matthew Baillie publishes The Morbid Anatomy of Some of the Most Important Parts of the Human Body, a key text on pathology.
- Fritchley Tunnel, the world's oldest surviving railway tunnel, is constructed at Fritchley in Derbyshire.
- Thomas Minton establishes his ceramics manufactory, Thomas Minton and Sons, in Stoke-upon-Trent, Staffordshire.
- Plymouth Gin Distillery begins production.

== Births ==
- 22 February – Mary Elizabeth Mohl, née Clarke, saloniste (died 1883 in France)
- 3 March – William Macready, actor (died 1873)
- 6 March – William Dick, founder of Edinburgh Veterinary College (died 1866)
- April – Thomas Addison, physician (died 1860)
- 1 June
  - Augustus Earle, painter (died 1838)
  - Henry Francis Lyte, hymn-writer (died 1847)
- 13 July
  - John Clare, "peasant poet" (died 1864)
  - George Green, mathematician (died 1841)
- 21 July – Thomas Pelham-Holles, 1st Duke of Newcastle, politician (d. 1768)
- 10 August – John Crichton-Stuart, 2nd Marquess of Bute, industrialist (died 1848)
- 25 September – Felicia Hemans, poet (died 1835)
- 17 November – Charles Lock Eastlake, painter (died 1865)
- 3 December – Clarkson Frederick Stanfield, marine painter (died 1867)
- 7 December – Joseph Severn, portrait and subject painter (died 1879)
- Sarah Booth, actress (died 1867)

== Deaths ==
- 5 January – John Howie, biographer (born 1735)
- 1 February – William Barrington, 2nd Viscount Barrington, statesman (born 1717)
- 2 February – William Aiton, botanist (born 1731)
- 6 February – Thomas Turner, diarist (born 1729)
- 20 March – William Murray, 1st Earl of Mansfield, judge and politician (born 1705)
- 26 March – John Mudge, physician and inventor (born 1721)
- 29 April – John Michell, scientist (born 1724)
- 31 May – Giambattista Tocco, Duke de Sicignano, ambassador of the Kingdom of Naples to London (suicide) (born c. 1760)
- 11 June – William Robertson, historian (born 1721)
- 26 June – Gilbert White, ornithologist (born 1720)
- 7 October – Wills Hill, 1st Marquess of Downshire, politician (born 1718)
- 16 October – John Hunter, surgeon (born 1728)
- 18 October – Highflyer, racehorse (born 1774)

== See also ==
- 1793 in Wales
