= 1891 in the United Kingdom =

Events from the year 1891 in the United Kingdom.

== Incumbents ==
- Monarch – Victoria
- Prime Minister – Robert Gascoyne-Cecil, 3rd Marquess of Salisbury (Conservative)

== Events ==
- 14 February – in the FA Cup quarter final in English Association football, a goal is deliberately stopped by handball on the goal line. An indirect free kick is awarded, since the penalty kick, proposed the previous year by William McCrum, has not yet been implemented. This event probably changes public opinion on the penalty kick, seen previously as 'an Irishman's motion'.
- 1–28 February – the driest month in the EWP series with an average of only 3.6 millimetres (0.14 in).
- 9–12 March – the Great Blizzard of 1891 in the south and west of England leads to extensive snow drifts and powerful storms off the south coast, with 14 ships sunk and approximately 220 deaths attributed to the weather conditions.
- 17 March – the British steamship SS Utopia sinks in the inner harbour of Gibraltar after collision with the battleship HMS Anson, killing 564.
- 18 March – official opening of the London–Paris telephone link, opening to the public on 1 April.
- 5 April – census in the United Kingdom: 15.6 million people live in cities of 20,000 or more in England and Wales and cities of 20,000 or more account for 54% of the total English population. The number of Welsh speakers in Wales is recorded for the first time and constitutes 54.4% of the population.
- 1–9 June – royal baccarat scandal: the Prince of Wales, the future Edward VII, appears as a witness in a trial for slander in the case of an army officer accused of cheating in an illegal gambling game at which the Prince was present.
- 15 June – funeral of explorer Richard Francis Burton; he is laid to rest in a mausoleum in Mortlake, Surrey.
- 25 June – Arthur Conan Doyle's detective Sherlock Holmes appears in The Strand Magazine for the first time.
- c. 26 July – Frederick Bailey Deeming murders his wife and four children in Rainhill, Lancashire, burying them under his kitchen floor. The crime is undiscovered until investigations into his murder, in December, of his second wife in Windsor, Australia, for which he will be hanged.
- c. August – Deptford Power Station (designed by Sebastian Z. de Ferranti for the London Electric Supply Corporation) is fully commissioned, pioneering the use of high voltage (10 kV) alternating current, generating 800 kW for public supply.
- 5 August – Elementary Education Act abolishes fees for primary schooling.
- 10 October – First street charity collection in the UK is held in Manchester in aid of the Royal National Lifeboat Institution.

=== Undated ===
- Baptist Union of Great Britain established by merger of the General and Particular Baptists.
- Rachel Beer takes over editorship of The Observer, the first woman to edit a national newspaper.

== Publications ==
- J. M. Barrie's novel The Little Minister.
- George Gissing's novel New Grub Street.
- Thomas Hardy's novel Tess of the d'Urbervilles.
- William Morris' novel News from Nowhere (book publication).
- Oscar Wilde's novel The Picture of Dorian Gray (book version) and Lord Arthur Savile's Crime and Other Stories.
- Henry James' short story The Pupil published in Longman's Magazine.
- Strand Magazine (January).

== Births ==
- 25 January – Gwen Ffrangcon-Davies, actress (died 1992)
- 9 February – Ronald Colman, English actor (died 1958)
- 11 February – J. W. Hearne, English cricketer (died 1965)
- 23 February – Robert Barrington-Ward, English newspaper editor (died 1948)
- 2 April – Jack Buchanan, Scottish actor and film director (died 1957)
- 5 April – Arnold Jackson, Olympic middle-distance runner, British Army officer and lawyer (died 1972)
- 22 April – Harold Jeffreys, English mathematician (died 1989)
- 25 April – Ivor Brown, journalist and author (died 1974)
- 7 May – Harry McShane, Scottish socialist (died 1988)
- 17 May – Lady Alexandra Duff, later Duchess of Fife suo jure and HRH Princess Arthur of Connaught by marriage, member of the British royal family and nurse (died 1959)
- 20 June – John A. Costello, third Taoiseach of Ireland, second to use that title (died 1976)
- 30 June – Stanley Spencer, painter (died 1959)
- 2 August – Arthur Bliss, composer (died 1975)
- 6 August – William Slim, Field Marshal (died 1970)
- 30 August – Henry Tandey, second most highly decorated British private soldier of World War I (died 1977)
- 5 September – Edward Molyneux, English fashion designer (died 1974)
- 16 September – Isabel Jeans, actress (died 1985)
- 25 September – Godfrey Ince, civil servant (died 1960)
- 8 October – Ellen Wilkinson, English socialist (died 1947)
- 20 October – James Chadwick, English physicist, Nobel Prize laureate (died 1974)
- 17 November – William Coltman, most highly decorated British private soldier of World War I (died 1974)
- 13 December – Hubert Phillips, economist, journalist, bridge player and composer of puzzles (died 1964)

== Deaths ==
- 4 January – Charles Keene, illustrator (born 1823)
- 6 January – Hugh Owen Thomas, orthopaedic surgeon (born 1834)
- 30 January – Charles Bradlaugh, political activist, founder and first president of the National Secular Society and Member of Parliament for Northampton (born 1833)
- 15 March – Sir Joseph Bazalgette, sanitary engineer (born 1819)
- 7 April – J. D. Sedding, ecclesiastical architect (born 1838)
- 13 April – Edward Austin, cricketer (born 1847)
- 29 May – William Synge, diplomat and author (born 1826)
- 2 June – Joseph Thornton, Oxford-based bookseller (born 1808)
- 7 June – William Bosomworth, cricketer (born 1847)
- 11 June – Barbara Bodichon, women's rights activist, educationalist and painter (born 1827)
- 6 October
  - Charles Stewart Parnell, Irish nationalist leader (born 1846)
  - William Henry Smith, politician and founder of W H Smith (born 1825)
- 15 October – Gilbert Arthur à Beckett, humorous writer (born 1837)
- 21 December – William Cavendish, 7th Duke of Devonshire, politician (born 1808)
- 31 December – Prince Victor of Hohenlohe-Langenburg, officer in the Royal Navy (born 1833)
