= 1855 in the United Kingdom =

Events from the year 1855 in the United Kingdom.

== Incumbents ==
- Monarch – Victoria
- Prime Minister – George Hamilton-Gordon, 4th Earl of Aberdeen (Coalition) (until 30 January); Henry John Temple, 3rd Viscount Palmerston (Whig) (starting 6 February)

== Events ==
- 9 January – The Earl of Aberdeen loses a vote of no confidence against his government over the management of the Crimean War.
- 22 January – French political exile Emmanuel Barthélemy is hanged after being convicted of murdering a London man. Barthélemy had previously killed a fellow Frenchman in the last fatal duel in England, but had only been convicted of manslaughter on that occasion.
- 29 January – Aberdeen resigns as Prime Minister.
- 5 February – Viscount Palmerston becomes Prime Minister.
- 8 February – The Devil's Footprints, a series of mysteriously hoof-like marks, appear in the snow in Devon and continue throughout the countryside for over 100 miles (160 km).
- 19 February – Bread riots in Liverpool break out.
- 28 February – Society of the Holy Cross (SSC) established as an association of Anglo-Catholic priests with a mission to the urban poor under the mastership of Charles Lowder.
- 11 April – The first pillar boxes in London are installed, at the suggestion of Rowland Hill.
- 16 April – Emperor of the French Napoleon III, with Empress Eugénie, begins a 6-day state visit to Britain, staying at Windsor Castle and Buckingham Palace.
- 18 April – The Bowring Treaty is signed between the UK and the kingdom of Siam, allowing foreigners to trade freely in Bangkok.
- 15 May – Great Gold Robbery from a train between London Bridge and Folkestone.
- 15 June – Stamp duty is removed from newspapers creating mass market media in the UK.
- 29 June – The Daily Telegraph newspaper begins publication in London.
- 4 July – Thomas Cook escorts his first party of excursionists to tour the European continent, travelling via Belgium and enabling the tourists to visit the Exposition Universelle in Paris.
- 16 July – Australian colonies granted self-governing status.
- 31 July – Limited Liability Act protects investors in the event of corporate collapse.
- 18 August – Queen Victoria, with Prince Albert, begins a 10-day state visit to Paris, the first visit of a reigning British monarch to France since 1413. While there, she visits the Exposition Universelle.
- 3 September – The last Bartholomew Fair takes place in London.
- 9 September – Siege of Sevastopol (1854–55) (Crimean War): Sevastopol falls to the British and their allies.
- 17 October – Henry Bessemer files his patent for the Bessemer process for the production of steel.
- 17 November – Explorer David Livingstone discovers Victoria Falls in Africa.
- 22 December – Metropolitan Board of Works established in London.

=== Undated ===
- James Clerk Maxwell unifies electricity and magnetism into a single theory, classical electromagnetism, thereby showing that light is an electromagnetic wave.
- The London School of Jewish Studies opens as the Jews' College, a rabbinical seminary, in London.
- Last minting of the fourpence coin (groat) for use in the U.K.
- The island of Samson, in the Isles of Scilly, is depopulated.

== Publications ==
- Samuel Orchart Beeton's weekly The Boys' Own Magazine (begins publication January).
- Mrs Archer Clive's novel Paul Ferroll.
- Serialisation of Charles Dickens' novel Little Dorrit.
- Mrs Gaskell's novel North and South.
- Charles Kingsley's novel Westward Ho!
- William Makepeace Thackeray's novel The Newcomes.
- Anthony Trollope's novel The Warden.
- The Ancient Music of Ireland, including the first published version of the Londonderry Air.

== Births ==
- 16 January – Eleanor Marx, socialist activisst and translator (suicide 1898)
- 21 January – Henry B. Jackson, admiral (died 1929).
- 1 May – Marie Corelli, novelist (died 1924).
- 23 May – Isabella Ford, socialist, feminist, trade unionist and writer (died 1924).
- 2 June – Archibald Berkeley Milne, admiral (died 1938).
- 28 August – Alexander Bethell, admiral (died 1932).
- 17 December – Frank Hedges Butler, wine merchant and founding member of the Aero Club of Great Britain (died 1928).

== Deaths ==
- 3 January – Julius Hare, theological writer (born 1795).
- 10 January – Mary Russell Mitford, novelist and dramatist (born 1787).
- 25 January – Dorothy Wordsworth, poet and diarist (born 1771).
- 20 February – Joseph Hume, doctor and politician (born 1777).
- 27 February – Bryan Donkin, engineer and inventor (born 1768).
- 3 March – Copley Fielding, watercolour landscape painter (born 1787).
- 31 March – Charlotte Brontë, author (born 1816).
- 13 April – Sir Henry De la Beche, geologist (born 1796).
- 15 April – William John Bankes, MP, explorer and Egyptologist (born 1786; died in Venice).
- 5 May – Sir Robert Inglis, 2nd Baronet, politician (born 1786).
- 23 May – Charles Robert Malden, explorer (born 1797).
- 28 June – Fitzroy Somerset, 1st Lord Raglan, commander of British forces in the Crimean War (born 1788).
- 6 July – Andrew Crosse, 'gentleman scientist', pioneer experimenter in electricity and poet (born 1784).
- 8 July – Sir Edward Parry, Arctic explorer (born 1790).
- 30 August – Feargus O'Connor, political radical and Chartist leader (born 1794 in Ireland).
- 4 September – Emma Tatham, poet (born 1829).
- 18 September – James Finlay Weir Johnston, chemist (born 1796).
- 27 September – John Adamson, antiquary and expert on Portuguese (born 1787)
- 3 December – Robert Montgomery, poet (born 1807).
- 18 December – Samuel Rogers, poet (born 1763).
- 20 December – Thomas Cubitt, master builder (born 1785).
