= Central England temperature =

Long-term meteorological dataset

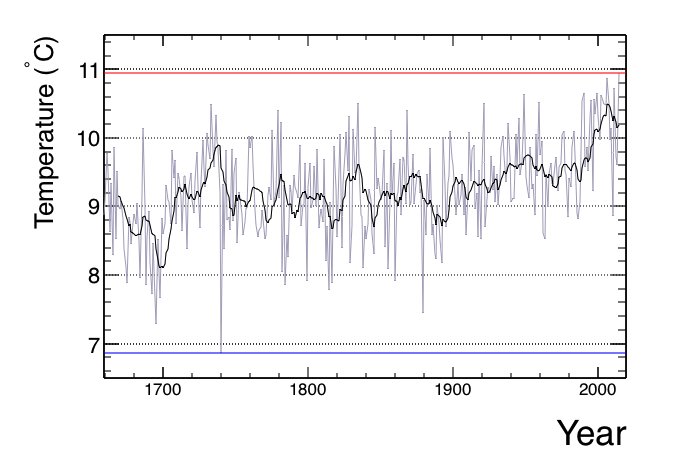
Central England temperature dataset, 1659 to 2014.

The Central England Temperature (CET) record is a meteorological dataset originally published by Professor Gordon Manley in 1953 and subsequently extended and updated in 1974, following many decades of work. The monthly mean surface air temperatures, for the Midlands region of England, are given (in degrees Celsius) from the year 1659 to the present.

This record represents the longest series of monthly temperature observations in existence. It is a valuable dataset for meteorologists and climate scientists. It is monthly from 1659, and a daily version has been produced from 1772. The monthly means from November 1722 onwards are given to a precision of 0.1 °C. The earliest years of the series, from 1659 to October 1722 inclusive, for the most part only have monthly means given to the nearest degree or half a degree, though there is a small 'window' of 0.1 degree precision from 1699 to 1706 inclusive. This reflects the number, accuracy, reliability and geographical spread of the temperature records that were available for the years in question.

The Central England temperature series is a composite series drawing upon multiple temperature series collected in central England, with 30 different sites used in the daily version. Each of the early time series that are used in forming the Central England composite may cover only a limited timespan, and these are spliced together to form the complete record. When multiple simultaneous observations exist, a weighted average of different time series may be used to determine the composite monthly average.

== Data quality ==
Although best efforts have been made by Manley and subsequent researchers to quality control the series, there are data problems in the early years, with some non-instrumental data used. According to Parker et al. (1992), up to 1814 Manley's data

are based mainly on overlapping sequences of observations from a variety of carefully chosen and documented locations. Up to 1722, available instrumental records fail to overlap, and Manley needed to use non-instrumental weather diaries, and to refer to the instrumental series for Utrecht compiled by Labrijn (1945), in order to make the monthly central England temperature (CET) series complete. Between 1723 and the 1760s there are no gaps in the composite instrumental record, but the observations generally were taken in unheated rooms rather than with a truly outdoor exposure. Manley (1952) used a few outdoor temperatures, observations of snow or sleet, and likely temperatures given the wind direction, to establish relationships between the unheated room and outdoor temperatures: these relationships were used to adjust the monthly unheated room data. Daily temperatures in unheated rooms are, however, not reliably convertible to daily outdoor values, because of the slow thermal response of the rooms. For this reason, no daily series truly representative of CET can begin before about 1770.

These problems account for the lower precision to which the early monthly means were quoted by Manley. Parker et al. (1992) addressed this by not using data prior to 1772, since their daily series required more accurate data than did the original series of monthly means. Before 1722, instrumental records do not overlap and Manley used a non-instrumental series from Utrecht compiled by Labrijn (1945), to make the monthly central England temperature (CET) series complete.

For a period early in the 21st century there were two versions of the series: the "official" version maintained by the Hadley Centre in Exeter, and a version that was maintained by the late Philip Eden which he argued was more consistent with the series as originally compiled by Manley.

The warmest year on record was recorded in 2025, with an average temperature of 11.23 degrees Celsius. This beat the previous 2022 record by 0.08 degrees and was almost 2 degrees over the 1961-1990 average.

== Trends revealed by the series ==
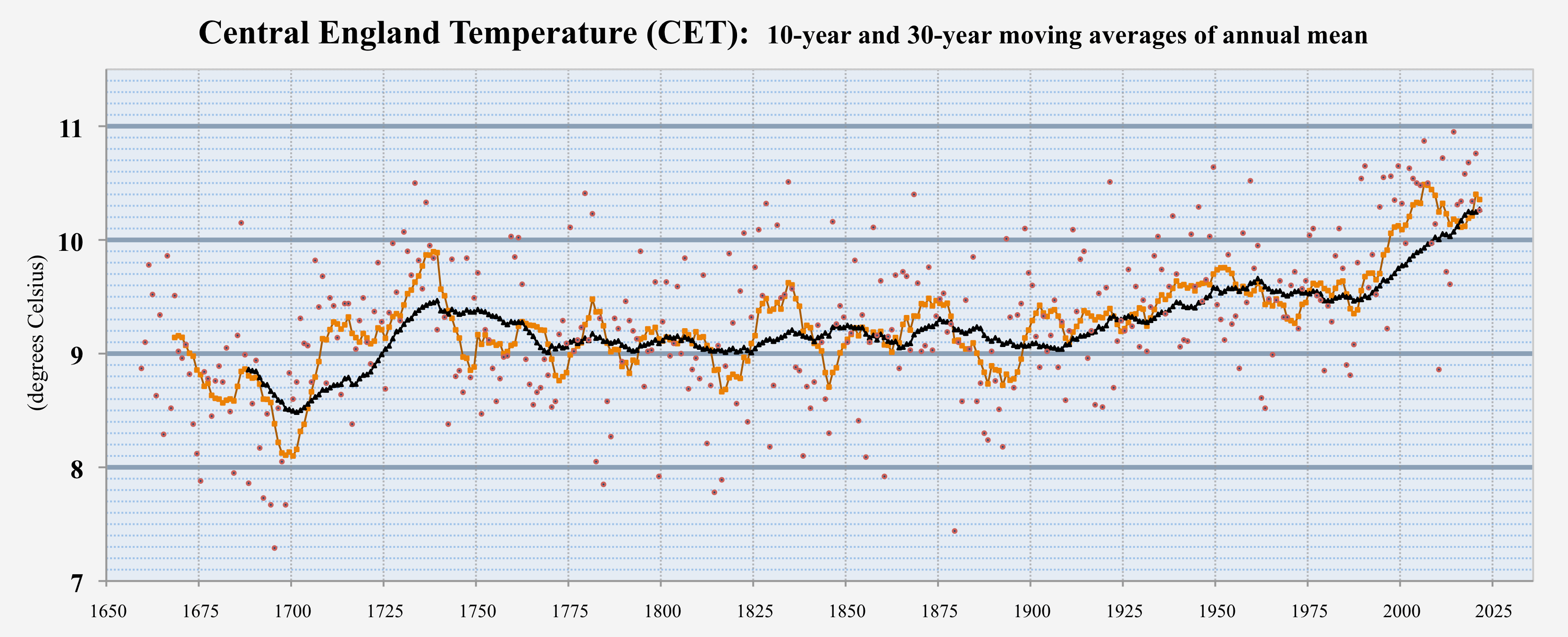
CET and its 10-year and 30-year moving averages (orange and black traces, respectively).

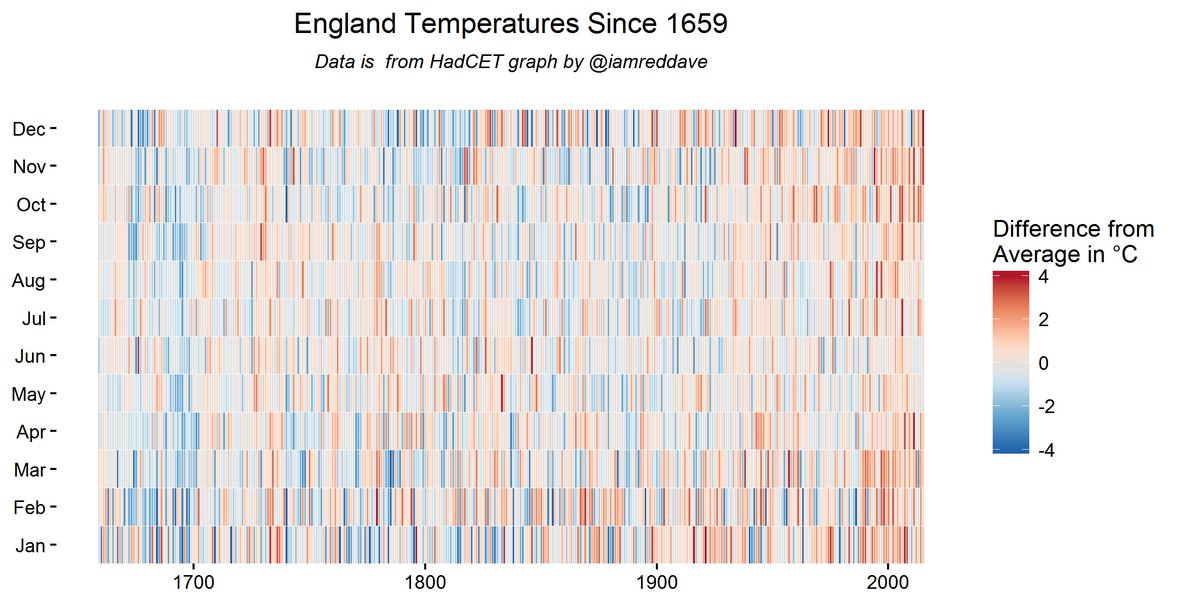
This stacked warming stripes graphic—technically a two-dimensional heat map—organizes CETs by month (vertically) and by year (horizontally).

During the eighteenth and nineteenth centuries, a cool period which coincided with cool winters and generally cool summers, the temperatures fluctuated widely but with little trend. From 1910, temperatures increased until about 1950, when they flattened before a sharp rising trend began in about 1975. The warmest decade on record is the 2010s (2011–2020) with a mean temperature of 10.40 °C (50.72 °F). (Note: Alternatively, if decades are measured from 00-09, the 2000s become the warmest decade on record, with a mean temperature of 10.39 °C (50.70 °F). However, the prevailing method of measuring decades is 01-00.)

Both the general warming trend and the hottest year on record at the time, 2014, have been attributed to human-caused climate change using observational and climate model-based techniques. This record was subsequently broken in 2022, when a mean CET of 11.15 °C (52.07 °F) was recorded, 1.68 °C (3.02 °F) above the 1961-90 average and breaking the 2014 record by nearly 0.2 °C (0.36 °F), and again in 2025, when a mean CET of 11.23 °C (52.21 °F) was recorded, breaking the 2022 record by 0.08 °C (0.14 °F).

== Extremes ==
Taking the 364-year period for the series as a whole:

=== Hottest ===
Period	Record Mean	Year
Year	11.23 °C (52.21 °F)	2025
Spring (March–May)	10.72 °C (51.30 °F)	2026
Summer (June–August)	18.5 °C (65.3 °F)	2026
Autumn (September–November)	12.64 °C (54.75 °F)	2006
Winter (December–February)	6.83 °C (44.29 °F)	2015/2016
January	7.6 °C (45.7 °F)	1916
February	7.9 °C (46.2 °F)	1779
March	9.2 °C (48.6 °F)	1957
April	12.0 °C (53.6 °F)	2011
May	15.1 °C (59.2 °F)	1833
June	18.2 °C (64.8 °F)	1846
July	19.8 °C (67.6 °F)	2006
August	19.2 °C (66.6 °F)	1995
September	17.0 °C (62.6 °F)	2023
October	13.3 °C (55.9 °F)	2001
November	9.9 °C (49.8 °F)	1994
December	9.7 °C (49.5 °F)	2015

=== Coldest ===
Period	Record Mean	Year
Year	6.86 °C (44.35 °F)	1740
Spring (March–May)	5.63 °C (42.13 °F)	1837
Summer (June–August)	13.10 °C (55.58 °F)	1725
Autumn (September–November)	7.50 °C (45.50 °F)	1676, 1740, 1786
Winter (December–February)	−1.18 °C (29.88 °F)	1683/1684
January	−3.1 °C (26.4 °F)	1795
February	−1.9 °C (28.6 °F)	1947
March	1.0 °C (33.8 °F)	1674
April	4.7 °C (40.5 °F)	1701 and 1837
May	8.5 °C (47.3 °F)	1698
June	11.5 °C (52.7 °F)	1675
July	13.4 °C (56.1 °F)	1816
August	12.9 °C (55.2 °F)	1912
September	10.5 °C (50.9 °F)	1674, 1675, 1694 and 1807
October	5.3 °C (41.5 °F)	1740
November	2.3 °C (36.1 °F)	1782
December	−0.8 °C (30.6 °F)	1890

== Mean, maximum and minimum temperatures ==
Since 1878, the Central England temperature has recorded daily maximum and minimum temperatures; its daily mean records began in 1772. The tables below show the record average max/min for each season and each calendar month since 1878.

=== Highest minimum ===
Period	Record Mean	Year
Year	7.37 °C (45.27 °F)	2024
Spring (March–May)	6.94 °C (44.49 °F)	2024
Summer (June–August)	12.99 °C (55.38 °F)	2026
Autumn (September–November)	9.11 °C (48.40 °F)	2006
Winter (December–February)	3.87 °C (38.97 °F)	2006/07
January	5.2 °C (41.4 °F)	1921
February	4.9 °C (40.8 °F)	2024
March	5.6 °C (42.1 °F)	1957
April	6.8 °C (44.2 °F)	2011
May	9.9 °C (49.8 °F)	2024
June	12.6 °C (54.7 °F)	2026
July	14.0 °C (57.2 °F)	2006
August	14.0 °C (57.2 °F)	1997
September	12.9 °C (55.2 °F)	2006
October	10.3 °C (50.5 °F)	2001
November	7.5 °C (45.5 °F)	1994
December	7.0 °C (44.6 °F)	2015

=== Lowest minimum ===
Period	Record Mean	Year
Year	4.3 °C (39.7 °F)	1879
Spring (March–May)	2.3 °C (36.1 °F)	1887
Summer (June–August)	9.7 °C (49.5 °F)	1922
Autumn (September–November)	4.1 °C (39.4 °F)	1919
Winter (December–February)	−3.1 °C (26.4 °F)	1962/63
January	−4.8 °C (23.4 °F)	1963
February	−5.2 °C (22.6 °F)	1895
March	−2.0 °C (28.4 °F)	1883
April	1.2 °C (34.2 °F)	2021
May	4.7 °C (40.5 °F)	1885
June	7.9 °C (46.2 °F)	1916
July	9.8 °C (49.6 °F)	1919
August	9.3 °C (48.7 °F)	1885
September	6.6 °C (43.9 °F)	1986
October	3.2 °C (37.8 °F)	1919
November	−0.4 °C (31.3 °F)	1915
December	−3.8 °C (25.2 °F)	2010

=== Highest maximum ===
Period	Record Mean	Year
Year	15.31 °C (59.56 °F)	2022
Spring (March–May)	16.05 °C (60.89 °F)	2025
Summer (June–August)	24.00 °C (75.20 °F)	2026
Autumn (September–November)	16.16 °C (61.09 °F)	2006
Winter (December–February)	9.80 °C (49.64 °F)	2015/16
January	10.4 °C (50.7 °F)	1916
February	11.5 °C (52.7 °F)	2019
March	13.8 °C (56.8 °F)	1938
April	17.2 °C (63.0 °F)	2011
May	19.0 °C (66.2 °F)	1992
June	22.6 °C (72.7 °F)	2023
July	25.6 °C (78.1 °F)	2006, 2026
August	25.1 °C (77.2 °F)	1995
September	21.5 °C (70.7 °F)	2023
October	17.1 °C (62.8 °F)	1921
November	12.4 °C (54.3 °F)	2011
December	12.4 °C (54.3 °F)	2015

=== Lowest maximum ===
Period	Record Mean	Year
Year	10.5 °C (50.9 °F)	1879
Spring (March–May)	10.1 °C (50.2 °F)	1879
Summer (June–August)	17.0 °C (62.6 °F)	1879
Autumn (September–November)	11.1 °C (52.0 °F)	1887, 1896, 1952
Winter (December–February)	2.5 °C (36.5 °F)	1962/63
January	0.6 °C (33.1 °F)	1963
February	0.0 °C (32.0 °F)	1947
March	5.7 °C (42.3 °F)	2013
April	9.3 °C (48.7 °F)	1879
May	12.8 °C (55.0 °F)	1902
June	15.5 °C (59.9 °F)	1909, 1972
July	16.6 °C (61.9 °F)	1879
August	16.0 °C (60.8 °F)	1912
September	14.4 °C (57.9 °F)	1952
October	10.2 °C (50.4 °F)	1896
November	5.8 °C (42.4 °F)	1919
December	1.2 °C (34.2 °F)	1890

== Daily records ==
Daily mean temperatures have been available since 1772, with max and min data available from 1878 onward.

=== Highest mean ===
Period	Record Mean	Date
January	12.7 °C (54.9 °F)	1 January 2022
February	13.7 °C (56.7 °F)	15 February 2024
March	15.2 °C (59.4 °F)	30 March 2017
April	19.7 °C (67.5 °F)	29 April 1775
May	23.2 °C (73.8 °F)	26 May 2026
June	26.5 °C (79.7 °F)	26 June 2026
July	28.1 °C (82.6 °F)	19 July 2022
August	25.8 °C (78.4 °F)	13 August 2026
September	23.3 °C (73.9 °F)	7 September 2023
October	20.1 °C (68.2 °F)	1 October 1985
November	15.5 °C (59.9 °F)	5 November 1938
December	13.1 °C (55.6 °F)	19 December 2015

=== Highest minimum ===
Period	Record	Date
January	10.9 °C (51.6 °F)	1 January 2022
February	11.1 °C (52.0 °F)	15 February 2024
March	11.1 °C (52.0 °F)	30 March 1998
April	12.4 °C (54.3 °F)	24 April 2007
May	15.0 °C (59.0 °F)	26 May 2026
June	20.1 °C (68.2 °F)	26 June 2026
July	19.6 °C (67.3 °F)	20 July 2016
August	18.8 °C (65.8 °F)	11 August 1997
September	18.4 °C (65.1 °F)	5 September 1949
October	15.3 °C (59.5 °F)	3 October 2011
November	13.5 °C (56.3 °F)	22 November 1947
December	11.7 °C (53.1 °F)	31 December 2021

=== Highest maximum ===
Period	Record Maximum	Date
January	14.5 °C (58.1 °F)	1 January 2022
February	18.6 °C (65.5 °F)	26 February 2019
March	22.2 °C (72.0 °F)	29 March 1965
April	25.0 °C (77.0 °F)	16 April 2003
May	31.5 °C (88.7 °F)	26 May 2026
June	32.8 °C (91.0 °F)	26 June 2026
July	37.3 °C (99.1 °F)	19 July 2022
August	35.2 °C (95.4 °F)	13 August 2026
September	31.2 °C (88.2 °F)	1 September 1906
October	27.0 °C (80.6 °F)	1 October 2011
November	18.7 °C (65.7 °F)	4 November 1946
December	15.4 °C (59.7 °F)	19 December 2015

=== Lowest mean ===
Period	Record Mean	Date
January	−11.9 °C (10.6 °F)	20 January 1838
February	−8.8 °C (16.2 °F)	9 February 1816
March	−6.5 °C (20.3 °F)	13 March 1845
April	−0.5 °C (31.1 °F)	3 April 1799
May	2.9 °C (37.2 °F)	8 May 1861
June	7.3 °C (45.1 °F)	9 June 1816
July	8.7 °C (47.7 °F)	20 July 1836
August	8.8 °C (47.8 °F)	26 August 1864
September	4.9 °C (40.8 °F)	28 September 1824
October	0.3 °C (32.5 °F)	29 October 1895
November	−4.6 °C (23.7 °F)	24 November 1904
December	−10.8 °C (12.6 °F)	25 December 1796

=== Lowest minimum ===
Period	Record Minimum	Date
January	−13.4 °C (7.9 °F)	21 January 1940
February	−13.6 °C (7.5 °F)	24 February 1947
March	−9.4 °C (15.1 °F)	5 March 1909, 7 March 1947
April	−4.9 °C (23.2 °F)	2 April 1917
May	−1.5 °C (29.3 °F)	4 May 1941
June	1.3 °C (34.3 °F)	5 June 1991
July	4.7 °C (40.5 °F)	4 July 1965
August	4.0 °C (39.2 °F)	31 August 1921
September	0.3 °C (32.5 °F)	29 September 1919
October	−3.9 °C (25.0 °F)	27 October 1931
November	−8.8 °C (16.2 °F)	24 November 1904
December	−15.9 °C (3.4 °F)	13 December 1981

=== Lowest maximum ===
Period	Record	Date
January	−5.7 °C (21.7 °F)	12 January 1987
February	−4.5 °C (23.9 °F)	6 February 1895
March	−1.1 °C (30.0 °F)	1 March 2018
April	2.3 °C (36.1 °F)	5 April 1911
May	6.0 °C (42.8 °F)	3 May 1892
June	10.1 °C (50.2 °F)	8 June 1897
July	12.5 °C (54.5 °F)	5 July 1920
August	12.0 °C (53.6 °F)	16 August 1888
September	8.3 °C (46.9 °F)	29 September 1918
October	3.1 °C (37.6 °F)	31 October 1934
November	−1.0 °C (30.2 °F)	28 November 2010
December	−4.0 °C (24.8 °F)	29 December 1908

== See also ==
- Climate of the United Kingdom
- England and Wales Precipitation
