= Samuel Best =

English, self-proclaimed prophet

Samuel Best (1738–1825) was an English self-proclaimed prophet, stated to have been, at one period of his life, a servant in several families in London, where he earned a reputation for dishonesty.

== Life ==
According to another account, he had possibly been a Spitalfields weaver in good circumstances. Some time before 1787, having disowned his children 'either from indolence or morbidity,' he became an inmate of Shoreditch workhouse, an allowance of eight shillings a week being contributed to his support by one of his daughters.

Discarding his original name, he took that of 'Poor-help,' as descriptive, in self-deprecatory language, of the special mission which his prophetic gifts enabled him to fulfill. He received his visitors in a room adorned with fantastic emblems and devices, and, after inspecting the palms of their hands, professed to give an outline of their past lives, their present circumstances, and their future prospects in verses of Scripture, which he repeated with rapid fluency. He also undertook, by licking the hands of his patients, to discover the disease under which they laboured. Owing to the interest excited in his pretensions, 'Poor-help' removed to a house in Kingsland Road, where he was consulted by many of the upper classes of London, whom he also visited at their own homes. He professed to eat no other food than bread and cheese, and to drink only gin tinctured with rhubarb. At night, he found the strength and refreshment that he needed for his pretentious daily duties, not in sleep, but in converse with celestial [i.e. heavenly] powers. For the last thirty years of his life, he was possessed of the conviction that he should be the leader of the children of Israel to rebuild the city of Jerusalem.

He died 7 March 1825, aged 87.
