= List of sperm whale strandings =

Strandings of sperm whales have occurred across much of their global range. About 60 per cent of the world's recorded sperm whale strandings occur in three regions – Tasmania, New Zealand and the North Sea. 132 strandings of sperm whales were recorded around the coast of the United Kingdom (mostly in Scotland) between 1990 and 2011. The list below is in reverse chronological order and is not exhaustive. Possible causes of stranding events are mostly speculative and are not reflected in this list.

== List ==
Year	Date	Country	Location	Numbers			Size and notes
Year	Date	Country	Location	Beached	Died	Survived	Size and notes
2024	March 10	United States	Sarasota County, Florida	1	1	0	44-foot (13.4-meter) male. Carcass dragged out to sea.
2021	June 6	United States	Bay County, Florida	1	1	0	29 ft (9 m) long
2020	December 24	United Kingdom	Withernsea, East Yorkshire	10	10	0	
2020	November 19	United States	Mobile Bay, Alabama	1	1	0	10.7m long
2018	November 23	New Zealand	Tokerau Beach, Doubtless Bay	1	1	0	15m long.
2018	November 19	Indonesia	Southeast Sulawesi	1	1	0	9.5 m long. Stomach contained over 1000 plastic items.
2018	April	Spain	Murcia	1	1	0	33 ft long. Underweight. Stomach contained many plastic items.
2017	December 29	New Zealand	Mahia Beach, Mahia Peninsula	1	1	0	18m long. Estimated 40–80 years old and weighing 35-40 tonnes. Buried. Claimed whale died of "natural causes", without undertaking necropsy.
2017	December 3	Australia	Hopetoun, Western Australia	1	1	0	Washed ashore dead and decomposing. First sighted at sea. Estimated weight 45 tonnes. Carcass disposed of by Shire of Ravensthorpe.
2017	December 1	Netherlands	Domburg, Zeeland	1	1	0	13.5m long adult male. Found dead. Body recovered for necropsy by Utrecht University.
2017	November 13	Indonesia	Aceh	10	4	6	7 were refloated, one returned to shore and died, and the remainder died on the beach.
2017	March 6	United States	Warrenton, Oregon (near Peter Iredale shipwreck)	1	1	0	36 ft long. Washed ashore in advanced stage of decomposition. First spotted floating offshore from Newport on March 2.
2016	December 3	United States	Sister Lake (Caillou Lake), Terrebonne Parish, Louisiana	1	1	0	23.5 ft long calf. Found dead. Body recovered for necropsy.
2016	November 21	United States	San José Island, Texas	1	1	0	28 ft long calf. Found dead. Body recovered for necropsy.
2016	October 19	United States	Little Florida Beach, Cameron Parish, Louisiana	1	1	0	23 ft long calf. Found dead. Body recovered for necropsy.
2016	October 18	United States	Little Gasparilla Island, Florida	1	1	0	19.5 ft long calf. Found dead. Body recovered for necropsy.
2016	August 27	United States	Ponce Inlet, Florida	1	1	0	12 ft long. Died 2 hours after attendants arrived. Body recovered for necropsy.
2016	July 10	United Kingdom	Perran Beach, Perranporth, Cornwall	1	1	0	Female. Alive at time of discovery. Died while under observation.
2016	May 16	Egypt	Marsa Matrouh	1	1	0	15m long, estimated weight 30 tonnes. Discovered dead. Samples were taken before the carcass was buried. The skeleton will be moved to Valley of The Whales where it will be put on display.
2016	May 5	Iceland	Dalvík	1	1	0	12m long. Discovered dead, carcass in good condition.
2016	February 4	United Kingdom	Hunstanton beach, England	1	1	0	Male, estimated 25–30 tonnes, 14 metres long. Found in the morning, died in the evening. Considered part of the "North Sea pod" strandings, aggregated in below record.
2016	February 2	Germany	Friedrichskoog	8	8	0	Male. Considered part of the "North Sea pod" strandings, aggregated in record below.
2016	January 8 – February 25	Denmark; France; Germany; Netherlands; United Kingdom	Multiple locations	30	30	0	Strandings of immature males at multiple sites around the North Sea in 5 countries over 6 weeks. Some of the animals' stomachs contained large quantities of plastic items, but that was not considered the primary cause of the strandings.
2016	January 12	Netherlands	Texel	5	5	0	Whales were discovered alive in the afternoon, but died overnight. Considered part of the "North Sea pod" strandings, aggregated in above record.
2015	November 15	Australia	Salmon Rocks, near Cape Conran, Victoria	1	1	0	
2015	October 15	Taiwan	Tongshi	1	1	0	Found stranded near Tingshi. Refloated, alive. Rediscovered three days later, dead, 20 km distant. Necropsy revealed various marine debris in the animal's stomach.
2015	September 21	Iceland	Skógasandur, Sólheimasandur	1	1	0	15m long bull carcass washed ashore on private property. Lower jaw was kept by the property owner.
2015	July 10	Singapore	off Jurong Island	1	1	0	Found dead, floating near tanker terminal. Possible ship strike.
2015	April 15	United States	Pacifica, California	1	1	0	Carcass washed ashore.
2014	December 17	United Kingdom	near Inver Beach, Easter Ross, Scotland	1	1	0	Discovered dead within the Tain Air Weapons Range complex. Scientists responded the following day. 50 ft long.
2014	December 15	Guyana	Kitty, Georgetown	1	1	0	Became entangled in fisherman's net day before stranding, then disappeared. Stranded the following day with pieces of net found in its mouth. Male. 45 ft long.
2014	December 8	Australia	Ardrossan, South Australia	8	7	1	One whale showed possible evidence of propeller wounds, all were female. Another was found distant from the group in 1.5 m water near Port Vincent and was successfully shepherded out to sea
2014	December 3	India	Kelua river mouth, Astarang, Odisha	1	1	0	32 ft long.
2014	November 24	New Zealand	Rototai Beach, Golden Bay	3	3	0	3 found dead, towed to sea for disposal
2014	October 13	Philippines	Barangay Lingsat, San Fernando City, La Union	1	1	0	9.5 metre long, 10-ton female washed ashore, died and was buried locally.
2014	October	Iceland	Breiðdalsvík, East Iceland	1	1	0	Teeth cleaned and kept, body burned.
2014	September	Italy	Central Adriatic coastline	7	4	3	Four were refloated, three females (one of which was pregnant and carrying a male fetus) died on the shore.
2014	May 1	Canada	Cape St George, Newfoundland	1	1	0	Found dead, one of four found in the area in a month. Town attempted sale on eBay
2014	April 6	Canada	Southeastern Avalon Peninsula, Newfoundland	1	1	0	Found dead, one of four found in the area in a month
2014	April 6	Canada	Trepassey, Newfoundland	1	1	0	Found dead, one of four found in the area in a month
2014	April 5	Canada	Biscay Bay, Newfoundland	1	1	0	Found dead, one of four found in the area in a month
2014	January 11	United Kingdom	Portobello beach, Edinburgh, Scotland	1	1	0	Taken to a landfill site for necropsy.
2014	January 11	Uruguay	Carrasco beach, Montevideo, Uruguay	1	1	0	Male. Carcass was lifted by crane and buried.
2014	January 10	United States	Boca Raton, Palm Beach, Florida	1	1	0	Washed ashore partly decomposed. Possibly the same whale found beached in the Florida Keys on January 4 (which was necropsied and refloated).
2013	October 31	United States	Madeira Beach, Florida	1	1	0	Euthanased, near St John's Pass, looked malnourished
2013	July 13	United States	Turtle Cove, Yona, Guam	1	1	0	35 ft male, likely died at sea, body washed up on reef.
2013	June 27	United States	Chetco Point, Brookings Harbor, Curry, Oregon	1	1	0	40 ft long. Washed up already badly decomposed.
2013	June 1	New Zealand	Serpentine Beach, Kumara Junction, West Coast Region	1	1	0	Male. Three other individuals of different species stranded in area within 2 days- others were pygmy sperm, long-finned pilot and Cuvier's beaked whales.
2012	December 5	Australia	Younghusband Peninsula, South Australia	1	1	0	4.7m long female. Washed up dead.
2012	November 18	Australia	Waitpinga Cliffs, Victor Harbor, South Australia	1	1	0	Washed up dead.
2012	August 14	United States	Hulls Cove, Bar Harbor, Maine	1	1	0	Found floating near Schoodic Point. Towed ashore for necropsy and collection by museum.
2012	March	United Kingdom	Skegness Beach	1	1	0	Cause of death believed to be ship strike. Animal was 50 ft long, had a gash down one side and was believed to have died at sea.
2012	February 8	Belgium		1	1	0	Was alive when beached, died soon afterwards.
2012	February	(Tunisia) Tunisian Republic	Sidi Daoud beach	1	1	0	12 m long, 15 tonnes
2011	September 12	Australia	Ocean Beach and Macquarie Harbour, Strahan, Tasmania	20			Pod discovered on Ocean Beach near Strahan. Nearby, rescuers attempted to free eight sperm whales stranded on a sand bar in Macquarie Harbour, about four kilometres south of the beach.
2011	June 1 (reported)	United Kingdom	Redcar beach, Cleveland	1	1	0	Stranded and died ashore. 44 ft long male.
2011	March 11	United Kingdom	Thanet, Kent	1	1	0	45 ft long.
2009	December	Italy	Southern Adriatic coast	7			All male.
2009	January 23	Australia	Perkins Island, Tasmania	50	50	0	Eight were alive at first assessment. No survivors, rescue confounded by shallow water, inaccessible location for machinery and sheer number of dead or dying whales.
2008	June 10	United States	Port Aransas, Texas	1	1	0	Whale was alive when NOAA received report. 27-foot long female. Euthanased and necropsied.
2007	August 12	Australia	Between Pelican Point and Blackfellows Caves, South Australia	1	1	0	Large gash on animal's back strongly suggests it had been involved in a ship collision.
2007	June	Iran	Near Jask, Hormozgan	1	1	0	Likely Gulf of Oman resident and first Iranian stranding on record.
2006	October 25	Australia	One Mile Beach, east of Hopetoun, Western Australia	1	1	0	Washed ashore, already dead.
2006	October 24	Australia	Bremer Bay, Western Australia	5	5	0	Died after beaching themselves. One whale was 20 m away from the others. Sizes ranged from 9.7 m to 12.5 m.
2006	August	Australia	Newcastle, New South Wales	1	1	0	Washed ashore dead bearing deep cuts believed caused by propeller strike from a large commercial vessel.
2006	August	New Zealand	Port Waikato	1	1	0	Juvenile female (7.2m) with visible injuries from fishing line entanglement. Washed up dead.
2006	June 1	(Tunisia) Tunisian Republic	Bizerte, Cap Zbib	1	1	0	16 m male.
2005	December 13	(Tunisia) Tunisian Republic	Tabarka	1	1	0	7.6 m partial body found. Female.
2005	March 7	(Republic of Ireland) Ireland	Belgooly Creek, Kinsale, Cork	1	1	0	14 m male found decomposed.
2005	February 22	United Kingdom	Fair Head, County Antrim, Northern Ireland	1	1	0	15 m male found decomposed.
2005	February 7	United Kingdom	Garron Point, County Antrim, Northern Ireland	1	1	0	11 m male found decomposed.
2005	January 17	(Republic of Ireland) Ireland	Long Strand, Castlefreke, Cork	1	1	0	10 m male found decomposed.
2004	June 16	Australia	Ocean Beach and Macquarie Harbour, Strahan, Tasmania	5	4	1	Four sperm whales found dead on Ocean Beach. Another, thought to be from same pod, was rescued after becoming stranded in Macquarie Harbour at Strahan.
2003	November 30	Australia	Arthurs Bay, Flinders Island, Tasmania	10	9	1	
2003	September 25	Australia	Doubtful Island Bay, near Bremer Bay, Western Australia	9	9	0	All badly gashed, at least 6 were dead at time of first inspection. Were neither rescued nor euthanised.
2003		New Zealand	Karekare beach, West Auckland	12			
1998	February	Australia	Multiple locations along the west and northwest coastlines of Tasmania	115			This was a mass stranding event that concerned several locations over a number of weeks. 3 February: Ocean Beach, Strahan: 66 whales stranded. Three towed offshore, fate unclear. 63 died. an additional deceased whale found 20km the site. 8 February Trial Harbour, Zeehan: Whale found with rope burns to the tail. 19 February: Greens Beach, Marrawah: 35 whales stranded, rescue attempts impossible due to severe weather. All 35 whales died. 26 February: Bluff Hill Point, Marrawah: Severely decomposed whale reported. 28 February: Black River Beach, Stanley: 11 whales stranded, 10 died. The 1 living whale was towed out to sea, but restranded. A second towing was successful and the whale was observed swimming away from the beach.
1997	March	United Kingdom	Firth of Forth, Scotland	1	1	0	40 ft long male, nicknamed 'Moby'
1995	January	Netherlands	Scheveningen	3	3	0	
1994	December	United Kingdom	Sanday, Orkney	11	11	0	
1994	November	Belgium	Koksijde/Nieuwpoort	4	4	0	
1994	October 29	New Zealand	Muriwai Beach, Auckland	72			
1992	October	Australia	Strahan Tasmania	12	10	2	Notes
1991	December	Denmark	Fanø	3	3	0	
1989	September 2	United States	West of Sabine Pass, Galveston, Texas25th	1	1	0	3-week-old calf, found stranded in surf and taken into care at Sea-Arama aquarium. Suffered a "pneumonia-like" lung infection and died a week after being discovered.
1984	February 9	Australia	Perkins Bay, Stanley, Tasmania	8	8	0	
1984	January	Netherlands	Henne, Strand	2	2	0	
1983	April 19	Australia	Prion Beach, south coast, Tasmania	1	1	0	Single dead animal approx 25 ft long, rolling in surf. Said to be 'nearly white' in colour.
1983	January 14	Australia	Temma, west coast, Tasmania	1	1	0	Single adult female washed up dead. 11.1 m long.
1982	October	Australia	Ringarooma Bay, Tasmania	1	1	0	Putrid carcass found weeks after stranding.
1982	February 9	Australia	Perkins Bay, Stanley, Tasmania	9	5	4	Nine animals observed swimming offshore, 1 hour before the second lowest spring ebb tide for February. Stranded later, four refloated after midnight. Five females remained, all were dead the next evening. Lengths ranged from 10.4 to 11.25 m.
1982	January 26	Australia	Ocean Beach, Strahan, Tasmania	14	14	0	Carcasses were found already decomposing. one female had aborted or evulsed a 3.96 m male foetus. 3 males, 11 females. Largest male was 14.3 m, largest female was 11.65 m long.
1982	January 23	Australia	Perkins Bay, Stanley, Tasmania	1	1	0	Adult female 10.6m long. Next day it evulsed a 4.1 m male calf.
1981	September 25	Australia	Fotheringate Bay, Flinders Island, Tasmania	2	2	0	Two mature males, 16m and 16.2m. Had been dead for about 2 weeks. In advanced stage of decomposition.
1981	January 15	Australia	Macquarie Harbour, Strahan, Tasmania	26	17	8	Nine animals returned to deep water, five voluntarily and four with assistance. One later restranded and died.
1980	March	Australia	South of Trial Harbour, Tasmania	3	3	0	Decomposing corpses of three animals.
1979	June 16	United States	Siuslaw River, Oregon	41			Event detailed in scientific paper.
1979	February 1	Mexico	Isla del Espiritu Santo	1			14.39 m male.
1979	January 1	Mexico	San Bruno, 15 km north of Mulege, Baja California Sur	56			38 males, 9 females, 3 aborted fetuses (none of which appeared to be full term), 9 of undetermined sex.
1978	August 29	Australia	Settlement Beach, Flinders Island, Tasmania	1			Single large animal.
1978	July	Mexico	Isla San José, Baja California Sur	1			11 m long. Sex undetermined.
1976	September 30	United States	Samoa Peninsula 1.6 km north of the entrance to Humboldt Bay, California	1	1	0	Decomposition prevented sex determination. A prominent dorsal hump and seven distinct knuckles or crenulations extended posteriorly down the back. Numerous crescent-shaped shark wounds were evident along the venter, back, and tailstock.
1975	July	United States	Humboldt Bay, California	1	1	0	Adult female, found floating in bay. Towed to sea for disposal. Washed ashore 4.8 km south of Humboldt Bay.
1975		Australia	Patriarchs Inlet, Flinders Island, Tasmania	3	3	0	Remains of three animals.
1973	September 1	Mexico	Huatabampito, Sonora	17			Sex not determined.
1973	July 30	United States	Shelter Cove, Humboldt, California	1	1	0	10.2 m long. Badly decomposed, sex undetermined.
1972		Australia	Strahan, Tasmania	27			Rescue attempts were made.
1970	November 9	United States	Florence,Oregon	1	1	0	14m Adult blown up with one-half short ton (450 kg) of dynamite on November 12.
1970	June 26	United States	Agate Beach, 1.0 km north of Patricks Point State Park, California	1	1	0	Adult male.
1970	March 17	New Zealand	Wainui Beach, Gisborne	59			Combination of males, females and their young. Detailed account online.
1954	December 28	Mexico	San Felipe, Baja California Norte	1			13 m male.
1954	July 14	Australia	Middleton Beach, Albany, Western Australia	1			13 ft long calf. Alive when first sighted.
1954	January 16	Mexico	La Paz, Baja California Sur	22			All bulls.
1953	December 12	Australia	mouth of Pioneer River, Brisbane, Queensland	1	1	0	50 ft long.
1953	July 15	Australia	Tallow Beach, Byron Bay, New South Wales	1			38 ft long, 25 ft circumference.
1953	April 12	Mexico	Cabo Tepoca, Sonora	9			All bulls.
1953	February 19	New Zealand	Maukau harbor, Auckland	1	1	0	Stranded on mudbank. Auckland War Memorial Museum sought to obtain the skeleton.
1949	December	Denmark	Wadden Sea	5	5	0	
1937	July	France	Dunkerque	2	2	0	
1937	February	Netherlands	Terneuzen	2	2	0	
1936	March 8	Australia	Stanley, Tasmania	1	1	0	48 ft long. Claimed for 'salvage' by Captain W.E. Leggett. Attempted to dispose away from settled areas towing the carcass behind a tugboat
1935	November 25	Australia	West Inlet, Stanley, Tasmania	1	1	0	23 ft long. Attempted to escape with rising tide but failed
1933	July	Australia	South of Mandurah, Western Australia	1	1	0	Found dead. Notes of amateur inspection published in newspaper.
1926	December 27	Australia	Burleigh Heads, Queensland	1	1	0	Washed ashore dead. Bones purchased and displayed at museum.
1913	August ?	United Kingdom	Cornwall, England	50	50	0	
1911	March 11	Australia	Perkins Island, Duck River, Tasmania	37	37	0	All bulls but one, average length 50 ft. The lone female was centrally positioned in the stranded group.
1908	June 13	United States	Mosquito Inlet, Florida	9	9	0	Stranded on ebb tide. Whalers extracted oil from bodies.
1890	August 21	Colony of New South Wales	Bald Hill, Port Wakefield, South Australia	1	1	0	50 ft long, had been dead "for some time"
1881	November	Colony of New South Wales	Point Bolingbroke, South Australia	1	1	0	53 ft long. On display at the South Australian Museum.
1872	January	Colony of New South Wales	Lipson Cove, South Australia	1	1	0	Plans were made to 'try out' and sell the oil.
1820	April 17	United States	New York, United States	1			Single animal stranded near point of Sandy Hook, New York. School had been seen in the vicinity for at least ten days following 14 April.
1770	December	Denmark	Hjarnø	2	1	1	
1765	January	Denmark	Bunken Strand	2	2	0	
1762	February	United Kingdom	Norfolk/Essex/Kent, England	12	12	0	
1762	January	Netherlands	Frisian Islands	7–8	7–8	0	
1762	January	Holy Roman Empire	Scharhörn/Neuwerk	2	2	0	
1757	February	Denmark	Fanø	3	3	0	
1753	February	United Kingdom	Findhorn, Scotland	3	3	0	
1751	March	Holy Roman Empire	Oldeoog	2	2	0	
1738	January	Holy Roman Empire	St Peter/Husum	3–4	3–4	0	
1723	December	Holy Roman Empire	Neuwerk	21	18	3	
1617	February	Netherlands	Noordwijk	3+	1	2+	
1617	January	Netherlands	Goeree	2	2	0	
1604	November	Holy Roman Empire	Pellworm	2	2	0	
1577	November	Netherlands	Ter Heijde	13–14	3	10–11	
1577	July	Netherlands/Belgium	Schelde	3	3	0	
1572	November	Denmark	Skallingen	3	3	0	
