= Janice Lough =

Climate scientist

Janice M. Lough FAA
- Education: University of East Anglia
- Occupation: Climate scientist
- Employer: James Cook University
- Known for: Marine science

Janice Lough FAA is a climate scientist at the Australian Institute of Marine Science (AIMS) at James Cook University, researching climate change, and impacts of temperature and elevated CO_{2} on coral reefs. She was elected to the Australian Academy of Science in 2022 for her research in climate change, coral reefs, and developing high resolution environmental and growth histories from corals, particularly the Great Barrier Reef.

== Career ==
Lough obtained both her BSc in 1976, and her PhD in 1981 at the University of East Anglia, in the UK. She worked at the University of Arizona, in the Laboratory of Tree-Ring Research, from 1982 to 1986, and subsequently moved to the Australian Institute of Marine Science in 1986.

Lough is a climate scientist who has been working on the growth and environmental records from corals over the past several centuries, and positioning these within a historical context. She also studies how climate changes have impacted tropical marine ecosystems already, as significant warming within tropical oceans has been recorded. She reports on the noticeable impacts of this warming with noticeable and observable consequences for current reefs.

Lough's career focuses on three areas, developing and interpreting reconstructions of paleo-climates, determining the nature, causes and consequences of climate variability on tropical coral reefs, as well as developing coral calcification histories, based upon coral cores. She has expertise in coral growth, calcification, climate change and the Great Barrier Reef. She is a member of the ARC Centre for Excellence for Coral Reef Studies, at James Cook University.

Lough's work has been described by the Carbon Brief, the ABC, New York Times, and Australian Geographic, as well as other media outlets, describing the impact of climate change on coral reefs. She has also published in the media on work on the calcification of changing oceans.

== Awards ==
- 2020 – International Coral Reef Society (ICRS) Fellow award
- 2022 – Fellow, Australian Academy of Science

== Selected publications ==
- Lough, J.M.; Barnes, D.J. (2000). "Environmental controls on growth of the massive coral Porites". Journal of Experimental Marine Biology and Ecology. 245 (2): 225–243. Bibcode:2000JEMBE.245..225L. doi:10.1016/S0022-0981(99)00168-9. PMID 10699212.
- Hobday, Alistair J.; Lough, Janice M. (2011). "Projected climate change in Australian marine and freshwater environments". Marine and Freshwater Research. 62 (9): 1000. Bibcode:2011MFRes..62.1000H. doi:10.1071/MF10302. ISSN 1323-1650.
- Hughes, T. P.; Baird, A. H.; Bellwood, D. R.; Card, M.; Connolly, S. R.; Folke, C.; Grosberg, R.; Hoegh-Guldberg, O.; Jackson, J. B. C.; Kleypas, J.; Lough, J. M. (15 August 2003). "Climate Change, Human Impacts, and the Resilience of Coral Reefs". Science. 301 (5635): 929–933. Bibcode:2003Sci...301..929H. doi:10.1126/science.1085046. ISSN 0036-8075. PMID 12920289. S2CID 1521635.
