= 1825 in the United Kingdom =

Events from the year 1825 in the United Kingdom.

== Incumbents ==
- Monarch – George IV
- Prime Minister – Robert Jenkinson, 2nd Earl of Liverpool (Tory)
- Foreign Secretary – George Canning
- Home Secretary – Robert Peel
- Secretary of War – Lord Bathurst

== Events ==
- 1 March – A fire destroys the outbound East Indiaman Kent in the Bay of Biscay with the loss of more than 80 lives, but passing ships save over 550.
- 21 March – British première of Beethoven's Symphony No. 9 (1824) is presented by the Philharmonic Society of London at its Argyll Rooms conducted by Sir George Smart (and with the choral "Ode to Joy" sung in Italian).
- March – Richard Roberts patents the self-acting spinning mule in England.
- 23 April – Royal charter granted to the Geological Society of London.
- 15 June – Work on the new London Bridge, designed by John Rennie, begins.
- 22 June – Cotton Mills Regulation Act establishes a maximum of 12-hour day for children under 16.
- July – England and Wales' dryest July on record, with a rainfall average of 8.2mm; from 14–19 July consecutively, the daytime maxima in London exceed 90 °F (32 °C).
- 6 July – A new Combinations of Workmen Act makes trade unions legal according to narrowly defined principles.
- 18 August – Scottish adventurer Gregor MacGregor issues a £300,000 loan with 2.5% interest through the London bank of Thomas Jenkins & Company for the fictitious Central American republic of Poyais. His actions lead to the Panic of 1825, the first modern stock market crash, starting in the Bank of England and precipitating the closure of six London banks and sixty country ones in England.
- 15 September – Royal charter granted to the Royal Society of Literature.
- 27 September – The world's first modern railway, the Stockton and Darlington Railway, opens with engineer George Stephenson driving the first public train pulled by the steam engine Locomotion No 1.
- 21 October – PS Comet II sinks off Gourock in the Firth of Clyde with the loss of 62 lives.
- 10 November – Royal charter granted to the Van Diemen's Land Company.
- 19 December – First of the annual Royal Institution Christmas Lectures in London, which is still continuing two centuries later.

=== Undated ===
- The first horse-drawn short-stage coaches run in the London area.
- Reconstruction of Buckingham Palace by architect John Nash.
- Michael Faraday isolates benzene.
- Cox's Orange Pippin apple cultivar first grown, at Colnbrook in Buckinghamshire by horticulturist and retired brewer Richard Cox.
- At about this date, London is estimated to overtake Peking as the world's largest city.

== Publications ==
- Walter Scott's novels The Betrothed and The Talisman.
- First publication of Samuel Pepys' Diary (1660–1669), edited by Lord Braybrooke from the transcription by Rev. John Smith.

== Births ==
- 10 February – Geoffrey Hornby, admiral (died 1895)
- 22 February – Elizabeth Ferard, Anglican deaconess (died 1883)
- 14 March – Elizabeth Anne Finn, writer on the Holy Land and humanitarian (died 1921)
- 28 March – A. J. Mundella, hosiery manufacturer and reforming Liberal politician (died 1897)
- March – William McGonagall, Scottish doggerel 'poet and tragedian' (died 1902)
- 24 April – R. M. Ballantyne, Scottish writer of juvenile fiction (died 1894)
- 1 May – Eleanor Vere Boyle, watercolourist and illustrator (died 1916)
- 4 May – Thomas Henry Huxley, biologist (died 1895)
- 8 May – George Bruce Malleson, colonel and writer on India (died 1898)
- 9 May – James Collinson, Pre-Raphaelite painter (died 1881)
- 7 June – R. D. Blackmore, novelist (died 1900)
- 24 June – William Henry Smith, founder of bookseller W H Smith and politician (died 1891)
- 13 October – Charles Frederick Worth, fashion designer, father of haute couture (died 1895 in France)
- 23 December (probable year) – Lord George Sanger, showman (murdered 1911)

== Deaths ==
- 22 February – Eleanor Anne Porden, poet (born 1795)
- 24 February – Thomas Bowdler, editor and physician (born 1754)
- 6 March – Samuel Parr, schoolmaster (born 1747)
- 7 March – Samuel Best, self-proclaimed prophet (born 1738)
- 27 March – Alexander Lindsay, 6th Earl of Balcarres, general (born 1752)
- 13 May – Charles Whitworth, 1st Earl Whitworth, diplomat (born 1752)
- 27 June – Edward Pigott, astronomer (born 1753)
- 20 August – William Waldegrave, 1st Baron Radstock, admiral, Governor of Newfoundland (born 1753)
- 4 September – Frederick Howard, 5th Earl of Carlisle (born 1748)
- 25 October – David Bogue, nonconformist leader (born 1750)
- 7 November – Charlotte Dacre, Gothic novelist (born c. 1772)
