= John Hawdon (sculler) =

- Born: c. 1852; Seaton

John Hawdon was a 19th-century British sculler.

Hawdon won several notable matches, including against former world champion Joseph Sadler.

== Early success ==
Hawdon was born and raised in the River Tyne region in England.

In 1876, Hawdon won the prize for scullers under age 21 at the Tyne Regatta, defeating H. Atkinson and Ralph Forster.

In 1877, James Percy became Hawdon's coach and trainer. That same year, competing in the Thames International Regatta, Hawdon came in first place in the open scullers' handicap race.

In March 1878, he defeated J. R. Hymes on a two-mile course on the River Thames. In a rematch three weeks later, Hawdon beat Hymes again on the River Tyne. In April 1878, Hawdon defeated Robert Bagnall, a top English sculler, on the River Tyne., During the 1878 Thames International Regatta, Hawdon won the second class sculls.

On 14 September 1878, Hawdon raced against Joseph Sadler. The race took place for £200. Sadler was out of shape and lost the race.

== Earning notoriety ==
On 1 October 1878, Hawdon raced against Joseph Cannon. Hawdon won with a time of 22 minutes,. 57 seconds. This victory established Hawdon as one of the top scullers in the United Kingdom.

=== Racing William Lumsden ===
Hawdon's victories over Sadler and Cannon set up a highly publicized match on 11 November 1878 against William Lumsden. Hawdon was considered the favourite as Lumsden was past his prime. The odds were 3 to 1 on Hawdon. The race was to be held on the River Tyne from the High Level to the Scotswood Suspension Bridge. The prize was £100.

Lumsden took the lead for the first two miles in rough water conditions. However, Hawdon reclaimed the lead and won the race. Lumsden claimed a foul but this was disallowed and Hawdon was declared the winner.

=== Racing Ned Hanlan ===
On 8 May 1879, Hawdon rowed against Canadian sculler Ned Hanlan on the River Tyne for a prize of £400. The odds were five to two on Hanlan,

Hanlan won the toss for position and took, the north side, which gave him shelter for the first half mile. At the end of the first hundred yards Hanlan had drawn a length ahead and a little further on was fully a length clear, with ease improving his position.

By the first quarter mile mark, it look apparent that Harlen was going to win easily. At Skinner Burn Hanlan was two lengths ahead. He frequently looked around over his shoulder to see that the course was clear, apparently not exerting himself to his fullest powers and seeming quite at ease, as if confident of the result. Approaching Redheugh Bridge Hawdon put on a spurt, but it had no effect. Hanlan also quickened up and passed under the bridge with a lead of about three lengths. Hawdon struggled manfully and rowed well and fast, while his opponent continued his easy, quiet style, never apparently exerting himself.

After passing under the bridge Hanlan actually ceased rowing. He allowed Hawdon to draw up almost on a level with him and then with a few strong strokes drew away and resumed his lead of nearly three lengths. The race was from the very first a one-sided affair, although Hawdon rowed gamely. More than once Hanlan allowed the Tynesider to draw up, but with the greatest ease quickly resumed the lead, while every few strokes he looked round to see his course. Near the top of King's Meadow Island the men were both in very rough water. Hanlan ceased rowing, and Hawdon with half a dozen strokes pulled up on a level with him. Hanlan smiled and nodded to his pilot, who was following in a cutter, and at once drew away. A little further later, Hanlan stopped rowing, sponged the water out of his boat, and then started rowing again. He repeated this two or three times.

Hanlan won the race by five lengths with a time of 22 minutes, 5 seconds. At the end of the race, Hanlan rowed up to Hawdon and shook hands with him as the crowd cheer his good sportsmanship.
