= 1867 in the United Kingdom =

Events from the year 1867 in the United Kingdom.

== Incumbents ==
- Monarch – Victoria
- Prime Minister – Edward Smith-Stanley, 14th Earl of Derby (Conservative)

== Events ==
- By February – The Society of Arts inaugurates the Blue plaque scheme, advanced by William Ewart, for erecting memorial tablets on London houses previously the homes of notable people, the first being at Lord Byron's birthplace, 24 Holles Street, off Cavendish Square.
- 11 February – abortive Fenian attempt to seize Chester Castle.
- 5 March – Fenian Rising in Ireland.
- 15 March – 'Conference of Trades' first meets; later forming the nucleus of the Trades Union Congress.
- 16 March – first publication of an article by Joseph Lister outlining the discovery of antiseptic surgery, in The Lancet.
- 29 March – Canadian Confederation: the British North America Act receives Royal Assent, forming the Dominion of Canada. This unites the Province of Canada (Quebec and Ontario), New Brunswick, and Nova Scotia as of 1 July. Ottawa becomes the capital, and John A. Macdonald becomes the Dominion's first Prime Minister.
- 1 April – Strait Settlement of Singapore, formerly ruled from Calcutta, becomes a Crown Colony under the jurisdiction of the Colonial Office in London.
- 11 May
  - Treaty of London: the great powers of Europe reaffirm the neutrality of Luxembourg, ending the Luxembourg Crisis.
  - The first comic opera with a score by Arthur Sullivan to be publicly performed, the one-act Cox and Box with libretto by F. C. Burnand, opens at the Adelphi Theatre in London and runs for 300 performances.
- 18 May – John Stuart Mill's motion to give women the vote is decisively rejected by the all-male House of Commons.
- 20 May – Laying of the foundation stone of the Royal Albert Hall by Queen Victoria.
- 22 May – Henry Chaplin's Hermit wins the Epsom Derby on a bitterly cold day at 1000:15 odds, ruining Chaplin's rival in love, Harry, Marquess of Hastings, who has bet heavily against him.
- 3 June – The sport of lacrosse is introduced from Canada.
- 1 July – Canadian Confederation: British North America Act of 29 March comes into force, creating the Dominion of Canada, the first independent dominion in the British Empire.
- 14 July – Swedish chemist Alfred Nobel demonstrates dynamite in a quarry in Redhill, Surrey, having patented it in the UK on 7 May.
- 15 July – Statute Law Revision Act 1867 ("An Act for further promoting the Revision of the Statute Law by repealing certain Enactments which have ceased to be in force or have become unnecessary") passed.
- 15 August
  - Benjamin Disraeli's Second Reform Act enfranchises many urban working men and adds 938,000 men to an electorate of 1,057,000 in England and Wales.
  - Factories Act Extension Act passed.
- 4 September – Sheffield Wednesday F.C. are founded at the Adelphi Hotel in Sheffield.
- 24–28 September – First of the Lambeth Conferences held.
- October – Thomas Barnardo opens his first shelter for homeless children, in Stepney.
- 12 October – End of penal transportation, as the last convict ship, the Hougoumont, departs from Portsmouth on an 89-day passage to Western Australia. 62 Fenians are among the transportees.
- 6 November – National Society for Women's Suffrage, the first such national campaign group, is formed by Lydia Becker.
- 8 November – An underground explosion at Ferndale Colliery in the Rhondda kills 178.
- 23 November – The three 'Manchester Martyrs' are hanged in Salford for the murder of a policeman whilst attempting to rescue two Irish Republican Brotherhood members from imprisonment on 18 September.
- 28 November – Opening of Baylis' Royal Colosseum Theatre and Opera House, Glasgow, which becomes the Theatre Royal, Glasgow in May 1869.
- 13 December – Clerkenwell explosion at Clerkenwell Prison during a Fenian escape attempt; 12 local residents are killed.

=== Undated ===
- Autumn/Winter – Wasps Rugby Football Club formed in London.
- Artizans, Labourers & General Dwellings Company formed.
- Henry Enfield Roscoe isolates vanadium.
- Formal rules for boxing, prohibiting bareknuckle fights, drawn up under the patronage of the Marquis of Queensbury.
- Clarence M. Leumane writes the song "The Lambton Worm".

== Publications ==
- Matthew Arnold's lyric poem Dover Beach.
- Walter Bagehot's treatise The English Constitution (in book form).
- Henry Ramsden Bramley and John Stainer's hymnal Christmas Carols, Old and New, 1st series.
- Rhoda Broughton's novel Cometh Up as a Flower.
- Ouida's novel Under Two Flags.
- Anthony Trollope's novels The Last Chronicle of Barset and Phineas Finn (serialisation).

== Births ==
- 8 January – Thomas Coward, ornithologist (died 1933)
- 11 January – John Ernest Adamson, English educationalist and Director of Education of the Colony of Transvaal (died 1950 in South Africa)
- 28 January – Agnata Butler, née Ramsay, classical scholar (died 1931)
- 4 February – Alexander Godley, general (died 1957)
- 27 February
  - Nina Boucicault, actress (died 1950)
  - Percy Dearmer, Christian socialist Anglican priest and liturgist (died 1936)
- 15 March – Lionel Johnson, poet (died 1902)
- 10 April – George William Russell (Æ), Irish-born nationalist, poet and artist (died 1935)
- 13 April – Sammy Woods, cricketer (died 1931)
- 3 May
  - J.T. Hearne, cricketer (died 1944)
  - Caroline Martyn, Christian socialist and trade unionist (died 1896)
- 26 May – Mary of Teck, consort of George V (died 1953)
- 27 May – Arnold Bennett, novelist (died 1931)
- 2 June – William Goodenough, admiral (died 1945)
- 17 June – Flora Finch, silent film comedian (died 1940 in the United States)
- 2 July – Herbert Prior, actor (died 1954)
- 24 July – E. F. Benson, author (died 1940)
- 2 August – Ernest Dowson, Decadent poet and fiction writer (died 1900)
- 3 August – Stanley Baldwin, Prime Minister (died 1947)
- 6 August – Sam Mussabini, athletics coach (died 1927)
- 9 August – Evelina Haverfield, suffragette (died 1920)
- 14 August – John Galsworthy, novelist, Nobel Prize laureate (died 1933)
- 19 September – Arthur Rackham, illustrator (died 1939)
- 21 September – Charles Bathurst, 1st Viscount Bledisloe, politician, 4th Governor-General of New Zealand (died 1958)
- 25 September – Katharine Glasier, née Conway, writer and socialist (died 1950)
- 7 November – George Paish, economist (died 1957)
- 24 November – Detmar Blow, Arts and Crafts architect (died 1939)
- 2 December – Alec B. Francis, actor (died 1934)
- Undated – Laura Anning Bell, née Richard, artist (died 1950)

== Deaths ==
- 16 January – William Marsden, surgeon (born 1796)
- 5 February – Henry Crabb Robinson, man of letters, lawyer and diarist (born 1775)
- 18 April – Sir Robert Smirke, Greek Revival architect (born 1780)
- 27 April – Benjamin Hall, 1st Baron Llanover, Welsh-born industrialist and politician (born 1802)
- 22 May – Edward Hodges Baily, sculptor (born 1788)
- 19 July – Maria Abdy, poet (born 1797)
- 4 August – William Crawshay II, industrialist (born 1788)
- 25 August – Michael Faraday, chemist and physicist (born 1791)
- 21 November – John Ogilvie, Scottish lexicographer (born 1797)
- 1 December
  - Charles Gray Round, barrister and politician (born 1797)
  - William Thomas, guardian of Aboriginal Australians (born 1793)
- 27 December – Maria Foote, actress (born 1797)
- 30 December – Sarah Booth, actress (born 1793)
- Undated – James Pollard, painter and aquatint engraver of equine subjects (born 1792)
