= 1812 in the United Kingdom =

Events from the year 1812 in the United Kingdom. The United Kingdom is still involved in the Napoleonic Wars with France and its attempts to stop French trade lead to the War of 1812 with the United States. Lord Wellington is active in the Peninsular War in Spain. This year also marks the only assassination of a British prime minister when Spencer Perceval is shot.

== Incumbents ==
- Monarch – George III
- Regent – George, Prince Regent
- Prime Minister – Spencer Perceval (Tory) (until 11 May); Robert Jenkinson, 2nd Earl of Liverpool (Tory) (starting 8 June)
- Foreign Secretary – Richard Wellesley, 1st Marquess Wellesley (until 4 March) Robert Stewart, Viscount Castlereagh (starting 4 March)
- Home Secretary – Richard Ryder (until 8 June) Lord Sidmouth (from 11 June)
- Secretary of War – Earl of Liverpool (until 11 June) Earl Bathurst (from 11 June)

== Events ==
- 1 January – The Bishop of Durham, Shute Barrington, orders troops from Durham Castle to break up a miners' strike in Chester-le-Street, Co. Durham
- 27 February – Poet Lord Byron gives his first address as a member of the House of Lords, in opposition to government repression of Luddite violence against industrialism in his home county of Nottinghamshire.
- 15 March – Luddites attack the wool processing factory of Frank Vickerman in West Yorkshire.
- 16 March–6 April – Siege of Badajoz (Peninsular War): The Anglo-Portuguese Army, under the Earl of Wellington, besieges Badajoz in Spain and forces surrender of the French garrison.
- 20 March – Destruction of Stocking Frames, etc. Act 1812 ("Frame-breaking Act") makes Luddite machine-breakers subject to capital punishment.
- 4 April – U.S. President James Madison enacts a ninety–day embargo on trade with the United Kingdom.
- 24 April – Luddites attack the Westhoughton Mill of Thomas Rowe in Lancashire.
- 11 May – Bankrupt banker John Bellingham assassinates Prime Minister Spencer Perceval in the lobby of the House of Commons.
- 18 May – John Bellingham is hanged at Newgate Prison.
- 25 May – Felling mine disaster: mine explosion at Felling colliery near Jarrow, 96 dead.
- 8 June – Robert Jenkinson, 2nd Earl of Liverpool (Tory) becomes Prime Minister. Aged 42 at accession, he will hold the office for almost fifteen years, the third longest-serving Prime Minister of the United Kingdom after Pitt the Younger, who was in office for over 18 years across his two premierships and Sir Robert Walpole whose single term was the longest, lasting 21 years from 1721 to 1742.
- 18 June – The War of 1812 begins between the United States and the United Kingdom.
- 18 July – The Treaty of Orebro brings an end to the Anglo-Russian War and the Anglo-Swedish War.
- 22 July – Peninsular War: at the Battle of Salamanca, British forces led by Lord Wellington defeat French troops near Salamanca in Spain.
- August – Henry Bell's PS Comet begins a passenger service on the River Clyde between Glasgow and Greenock, the first commercially successful steamboat service in Europe.
- 12 August
  - Peninsular War: Wellington enters Madrid following the Battle of Salamanca.
  - The Middleton Railway, serving coal pits at Leeds, becomes the first to use steam locomotives successfully in regular service.
- 16 August – War of 1812: American General William Hull surrenders Fort Detroit without a fight to the British Army.
- 19 August – War of 1812: USS Constitution defeats the British frigate Guerriere off the coast of Nova Scotia.
- 5 October–10 November – A general election sees victory for the Tory Party under Robert Jenkinson, 2nd Earl of Liverpool.
- 9 October – War of 1812: in a naval engagement on Lake Erie, American forces capture two British ships, HMS Detroit and HMS Caledonia.
- 13 October – War of 1812: Battle of Queenston Heights – as part of the Niagara campaign in Ontario, Canada, American forces under General Stephen Van Rensselaer IV are repulsed from invading Canada by British and native troops led by Sir Isaac Brock (although he dies during the battle).
- 7 November – HMS Victory is retired from front-line service.

=== Undated ===
- Alton Barnes White Horse cut in Wiltshire.

=== Ongoing ===
- Napoleonic Wars, 1803–1815
- Peninsular War, 1808–1814

== Publications ==
- First two cantos of Lord Byron's Childe Harold's Pilgrimage. This sells out in five days after publication on 20 March, giving rise to Byron's comment "I awoke one morning and found myself famous".
- Sir Richard Colt Hoare's study The Ancient History of South Wiltshire, one of the earliest works to use evidence from archaeology.
- James and Horace Smith's parodies Rejected Addresses.

== Births ==
- 7 February – Charles Dickens, novelist (died 1870)
- 1 March – Augustus Pugin, architect (died 1852)
- 12 March – Joseph Prestwich, geologist (died 1896)
- 7 May – Robert Browning, poet (died 1889)
- 12 May – Edward Lear, nonsense poet, illustrator and painter (died 1888)
- 8 July – Louisa Hamilton, Duchess of Abercorn, aristocrat (died 1905)
- 24 September – Mary Ann Browne, poet and writer of musical scores (died 1845)
- 25 November – Henry Mayhew, writer (died 1887)
- 14 December – Charles Canning, 1st Viceroy of India (died 1862)
- 23 December – Samuel Smiles, author and reformer (died 1904)

== Deaths ==
- 23 January – Robert Craufurd, general (mortally wounded in battle) (born 1764)
- 11 March – Philip James de Loutherbourg, painter (born 1740 in Alsace)
- 18 March – John Horne Tooke, politician and philologist (born 1736)
- 7 April – Robert Willan, dermatologist (born 1757)
- 25 April – Edmond Malone, Shakespearian scholar (born 1741 in Ireland)
- 11 May – Spencer Perceval, Prime Minister (assassinated) (born 1762)
- 18 May – John Bellingham, Perceval's killer (executed) (born c. 1769)
- 12 August – William Booth, forger (executed) (baptised 1776)
- 13 October – Isaac Brock, British general (killed in battle) (born 1769)
- 28 October – Susanna Duncombe, poet and painter (born 1725)
- 16 November – John Walter, newspaper proprietor (born c. 1738)
