= List of shipwrecks in December 1847 =

The list of shipwrecks in December 1847 includes ships sunk, foundered, wrecked, grounded, or otherwise lost during December 1847.

== 1 December ==
List of shipwrecks: 1 December 1847
Ship	State	Description
Christiana and Margaret	United Kingdom	The sloop was abandoned in the North Sea. Her crew were rescued by Cristoforo Colombo (flag unknown). Christiana and Margaret foundered on 4 December. She was on a voyage from Dundee, Forfarshire to Newcastle upon Tyne, Northumberland.
Zephyr	United Kingdom	The ship ran aground on the Nore. She was refloated on 3 December and proceeded to London.

== 2 December ==
List of shipwrecks: 2 December 1847
Ship	State	Description
Mary	United Kingdom	The brig was wrecked on a reef in the Pacific Ocean (approximately 19°S 163°E) with the loss of a crew member. She was on a voyage from Sydney, New South Wales to Manila, Spanish East Indies.
Oceanus	United Kingdom	The ship was driven ashore on George's Island, Massachusetts, United States. She was on a voyage from Londonderry to Boston, Massachusetts. She was refloated and taken in to Boston in a leaky condition.
Sharon	United Kingdom	The ship was driven ashore on George's Island.
Symmetry	United Kingdom	The ship was driven ashore at King's Lynn, Norfolk. She was refloated on 3 December.
Victoria	United Kingdom	The ship was wrecked on Skagen, Denmark with the loss of two of her crew. She was on a voyage from Grangemouth, Stirlingshire to Memel, Prussia.

== 3 December ==
List of shipwrecks: 3 December 1847
Ship	State	Description
Atlas	United Kingdom	The full-rigged ship foundered in the Atlantic Ocean 150 nautical miles (280 km) south west of the Isles of Scilly with the loss of all but four of her crew. Survivors were rescued by the barque Baronet (United Kingdom). Atlas was on a voyage from Cardiff, Glamorgan to Bombay, India.
Edouard	France	The smack was driven ashore and wrecked at Brook, Isle of Wight, United Kingdom. Her crew were rescued.
Erromanga	United Kingdom	The ship ran aground and sank at Cape Janissary, in the Dardanelles. Her crew survived. She was on a voyage from Taganrog, Russia to a British port.
Gustaf von Hagenow	Stralsund	The ship was wrecked on Rügen, Prussia. Her crew were rescued. She was on a voyage from Newcastle upon Tyne, Northumberland, United Kingdom to Stralsund.
Juanita	Norway	The ship was driven ashore and wrecked at Helsingør, Denmark. She was on a voyage from Wick, Caithness, United Kingdom to Stettin.
Mary	United Kingdom	The brig was wrecked on a reef in the Pacific Ocean (10°30′S 163°10′E). All on board were rescued by HMS Bramble (Royal Navy). Mary was on a voyage from Sydney, New South Wales to Manila, Spanish East Indies.
Quicksilver	United Kingdom	The schooner ran aground on the Gunfleet Sand, in the North Sea off the coast of Essex and was abandoned by her crew. She was on a voyage from Sunderland, County Durham to London. Quicksilver was refloated on 4 December with the assistance of several smacks and taken in to Harwich, Essex.
Reform	United Kingdom	The sloop foundered in the Lynn Deeps. Both crew took to a boat and were rescued the next day by Heron (United Kingdom). Reforem was on a voyage from Beccles, Suffolk to Goole, Yorkshire.
Souvenir	(United Kingdom of Great Britain and Ireland) New South Wales	The ship ran aground at Port Phillip. She was on a voyage from Port Phillip to Geelong.
W. Smith O'Brien	United States	The ship was wrecked on Murder Island, Nova Scotia, British North America. she was on a voyage from Boston, Massachusetts to Halifax, Nova Scotia.

== 4 December ==
List of shipwrecks: 4 December 1847
Ship	State	Description
Albion	United Kingdom	The ship was wrecked on the Gunfleet Sand, in the North Sea off the coast of Essex. Her crew were rescued.
Annabell	(United Kingdom of Great Britain and Ireland) British North America	The ship was driven ashore and severely damaged in the Gut of Canso. She was on a voyage from Georgetown, Prince Edward Island, British North America to London. She was refloated on 7 December and taken in to Ship Harbour, Nova Scotia for repairs.
Bolivar	United Kingdom	The ship was in collision with the brig Argyle and the steamship Prince of Wales (both United Kingdom) and was consequently beached at Penarth, Glamorgan. She was refloated the next day and taken in to Cardiff, Glamorgan.
Bridgwater	United Kingdom	The ship was wrecked on the Gunfleet Sand. Her crew were rescued.
Elizabeth and Ann	United Kingdom	The ship was driven ashore and severely damaged at Carnet, County Londonderry. She was on a voyage from Waterford to Wexford. She was refloated on 8 December but was beached again.
Fanny	United Kingdom	The ship ran aground on the Barber Sand, in the North Sea off the coast of Norfolk. She was on a voyage from Sunderland, County Durham to Chatham, Kent. She was refloated and resumed her voyage.
Favourite	United Kingdom	The ship was abandoned on the Kentish Knock. Her crew were rescued. She was on a voyage from Sunderland to Margate, Kent.
Gesine	Norway	The ship was driven ashore near Nexø, Denmark. She was on a voyage from Åhus, Sweden to Bergen.
Jehu	United Kingdom	The ship was driven ashore and wrecked in Hell Bay, Cornwall. Her crew were rescued.
Jersey Maid	(United Kingdom of Great Britain and Ireland) Jersey	The ship was driven ashore and wrecked at Saltfleet, Lincolnshire. She was on a voyage from Newcastle upon Tyne, Northumberland to Jersey.
Kilmaurs	United Kingdom	The ship departed from Havana, Cuba for London. No further trace, presumed foundered with the loss of all hands.
Lisbon Packet	United Kingdom	The ship was driven ashore and wrecked on "Smolen". Her crew were rescued. She was on a voyage from Arkhangelsk, Russia to Aberdeen.
Matilda	United Kingdom	The ship was wrecked in the Wood Islands, Prince Edward Island, British North America. She was on a voyage from Prince Edward Island, British North America to London.
Oriental	Kingdom of the Two Sicilies	The schooner was lost near Noto. Her crew were rescued.
Success	United Kingdom	The smack was driven against the pier at Ayr and sank. Her three crew survived. She was on a voyage from Campbeltown, Argyllshire to Ayr.
Twins	United Kingdom	The schooner was driven ashore at Newhaven, Sussex. She was declared a total loss. She was taken in to Newhaven on 6 December.

== 5 December ==
List of shipwrecks: 4 December 1847
Ship	State	Description
Addolanta	Kingdom of the Two Sicilies	The ship was wrecked near Pevensey, Sussex, United Kingdom with the loss of ten of her fourteen crew. She was on a voyage from London, United Kingdom to Naples.
Champion	United Kingdom	The brig was wrecked in Pevensey Bay with the loss of ten of her fourteen crew.
Concord	United Kingdom	The ship was wrecked on the Shipwash Sand, in the North Sea off the coast of Essex. Her crew were rescued by the Great Yarmouth Lifeboat.
Diligente	Spain	The ship was driven ashore and wrecked at Bilbao. Her crew were rescued. She was on a voyage from La Guaira, Venezuela to Bilbao.
Elizabeth	(United Kingdom of Great Britain and Ireland) Guernsey	The schooner was in collision with the brig Catherine (United Kingdom) off Flamborough Head, Yorkshire and was abandoned. Her crew were rescued.
Elizabeth	United Kingdom	The brig foundered off Andros, Greece, Her crew were rescued. She was on a voyage from Taganrog, Russia to an English port.
Enterprise	United Kingdom	The ship was driven ashore at St. Anthony's Lighthouse, Cornwall. She was on a voyage from Troon, Ayrshire to Lisbon, Portugal.
Garonne	United Kingdom	The ship ran aground and was consequently beached at the Mumbles, Glamorgan. She was refloated on 8 December and taken in to Swansea, Glamorgan.
Ino	(United Kingdom of Great Britain and Ireland) Guernsey	The schooner ran aground on the Sticelet Ledge, in the English Channel 5 nautical miles (9.3 km) west of Cowes, Isle of Wight. She was on a voyage from South Shields to Guernsey. She was refloated the next day and taken in to Cowes.
James Saville	United Kingdom	The brigantine was driven ashore and capsized in Carteret Bay. All on board were rescued. She was on a voyage from Saint-Malo, Ille-et-Vilaine, France to Sunderland, County Durham. James Saville had been refloated by 26 January 1848 and taken in to Carteret, Manche, France.
John	United Kingdom	The ship was driven ashore and wrecked in Hell Bay, Cornwall. Her crew were rescued.
Lady Courtenay	United Kingdom	The ship was last sighted off Villaviciosa, Spain on this date.
Little Wonder	United Kingdom	The ship was driven ashore at Boulmer, Northumberland. She was on a voyage from Sunderland to Montrose, Forfarshire. She was refloated and resumed her voyage.
Lovisse Caroline	(Russian Empire) Grand Duchy of Finland	The ship was wrecked near Mandal, Norway. Her crew were rescued. She was on a voyage from Hull, Yorkshire to Porvoo.
Monte	United Kingdom	The ship was driven ashore at Sunderland.
New Holland	United Kingdom	The ship was wrecked on the Goodwin Sands, Kent. Her crew were rescued by the lugger Tartar (United Kingdom). New Holland was on a voyage from Port-au-Prince, Haiti to London.
Oak	United Kingdom	The ship departed from Newcastle upon Tyne, Northumberland for Lowestoft, Suffolk. No further trace, presumed foundered in the North Sea with the loss of all hands.
Susannah	United Kingdom	The ship sank whilst on a voyage from Cardiff, Glamorgan to Cork. Her crew were rescued by the schooner Speedy (United Kingdom).
Volant	United Kingdom	The ship was wrecked near Medea, Ottoman Empire with the loss of four lives.
William Lee	United Kingdom	The ship was driven ashore and damaged on Öland, Sweden. She was on a voyage from Saint Petersburg, Russia to Hull, Yorkshire. She was refloated on 10 December and taken in to "Egvaag".

== 6 December ==
List of shipwrecks: 6 December 1847
Ship	State	Description
Adeline	Danzig	The ship was lost near Falkenberg, Sweden. She was on a voyage from Danzig to Berwick upon Tweed, Northumberland, United Kingdom.
Æolus	United Kingdom	The ship ran aground off Poplar Point, Pembrokeshire. She was on a voyage from Waterford to Cardiff, Glamorgan.
Agenoria	United Kingdom	The schooner was driven ashore and wrecked at Dunglass, Lothian with the loss of all three crew.
Amelia	United Kingdom	The barque ran aground on Dutchman's Bank, in the Irish Sea. She was refloated but subsequently driven ashore the next day at Beaumaris, Anglesey. She was on a voyage from Eastport, Maine, United States to Liverpool, Lancashire. She was refloated on 10 December and taken in to Beaumaris, where she was condemned.
Ann	United Kingdom	The sloop was driven ashore and wrecked at Granton, Edinburgh.
Archiduca Frederico	Flag unknown	The brig was wrecked in Llandulas Bay with the loss of three of her crew.
Atalanta	United Kingdom	The ship was driven ashore at Littlehampton, Sussex. She was on a voyage from Newcastle upon Tyne, Northumberland to Littlehampton. She was refloated on 22 December and taken in to Littlehampton.
Blackets	United Kingdom	The sloop was driven ashore and wrecked east of Dunbar, Lothian with the loss of two of her three crew.
Circassian	United Kingdom	The brig was driven ashore at Swansea, Glamorgan with the loss of either none, or six, of her crew. Survivors were rescued the next day. She was on a voyage from Cuba to Swansea. Circassian was refloated on 8 December and taken in to Swansea.
Cordelia	United Kingdom	The ship was driven ashore at Rye, Sussex. She was on a voyage from Shoreham-by-Sea to Rye. Cordelia was refloated on 8 December and taken in to Rye.
Darlington Packet	United Kingdom	The barque was wrecked on the Scroby Sands, Norfolk. Her crew were rescued by the Caistor Lifeboat. She was on a voyage from Stockton on Tees, County Durham to London.
Eliza	United Kingdom	The ship was driven ashore at Moyne, County Wicklow.
Elizabeth	(United Kingdom of Great Britain and Ireland) Guernsey	The ship was run down and sunk. Her crew were rescued.
Erin	United Kingdom	The schooner was driven ashore at Cardigan. Her crew were rescued. She was on a voyage from Wexford to Gloucester.
Francis Lawson	United Kingdom	The barque was driven ashore near Minehead, Somerset. Her crew were rescued. She was on a voyage from Quebec City, Province of Canada, British North America to Bridgwater, Somerset.
George	United Kingdom	The barque was driven ashore at Newhaven, Edinburgh. She was refloated on 7 December but had to be beached.
Halifax	United Kingdom	The brig was driven ashore 1 nautical mile (1.9 km) east of Port Seton, Lothian. Her seven crew were rescued. She was on a voyage from Montrose, Forfarshire to Sunderland, County Durham.
Hope	United Kingdom	The ship ran aground on the Long Sand, in the North Sea off the coast of Essex. Her crew were rescued. She was on a voyage from London to Wisbech, Cambridgeshire.
Johns	United Kingdom	The sloop was driven ashore and wrecked on Siccar Point, Berwickshire.
Kent	United Kingdom	The steam tug was driven ashore at Kirkcaldy, Fife.
Lady Eleanor	United Kingdom	The ship was driven ashore at Milford Haven, Pembrokeshire. She was on a voyage from Liverpool, Lancashire to Galway.
Lilian	(United Kingdom of Great Britain and Ireland) New South Wales	The ship ran aground at Port Phillip.
Lochfine	United Kingdom	The steamship sprang a leak in the Sound of Kilbrandon whilst on a voyage from Greenock, Renfrewshire to Aden. Her passengers were taken off by Defiance (United Kingdom), which towed Lochfine back to Greenock, where she sank. She was later refloated.
Lord Canterbury	United Kingdom	The full-rigged ship was wrecked in the Atlantic Ocean. Thirteen crew were rescued on 16 December by the barque John (United Kingdom), three more were rescued the next day. Four crew drowned. She was on a voyage from Quebec City to Bristol, Gloucestershire.
Montreal	United Kingdom	The brig was wrecked on the Herd Sand, off the mouth of the River Tyne. Her crew were rescued.
Moses John	United Kingdom	The ship was driven ashore and wrecked in Oran Bay, County Galway. She was on a voyage from Galaţi, Ottoman Empire to Limerick.
Napier	United Kingdom	The schooner was driven ashore 1 nautical mile (1.9 km) east of Port Seton. Her crew were rescued. She was on a voyage from East Wemyss, Fife to Perth.
Northallerton	United Kingdom	The ship was driven ashore and wrecked at Winterton-on-Sea, Norfolk with the loss of all hands, about ten lives. She was on a voyage from Stockton-on-Tees, County Durham to London.
Northumberland	United Kingdom	The barque was driven ashore and wrecked at "Redheugh" with the loss of four of her sixteen crew. Survivors were rescued by rocket apparatus.
Orinoco	United Kingdom	The ship was driven ashore near Milford Haven, Pembrokeshire. She was on a voyage from Llanelly, Glamorgan to London.
Pandora	(United Kingdom of Great Britain and Ireland) Jersey	The ship was wrecked on Grand Cayman. She was on a voyage from Tobago to La Guaira, Venezuela.
Pantaloon	United Kingdom	The schooner departed from Liverpool for Glasgow, Renfrewshire. No further trace, presumed foundered in the Irish Sea with the loss of all eleven crew.
Peter Senn	United Kingdom	The ship was driven ashore at Innistyre, County Mayo.
Phoenix	United Kingdom	The ship was driven ashore at Derbyhaven, Isle of Man. She was on a voyage from Liverpool to Belfast, County Antrim.
Polton''	United Kingdom	The sloop was driven ashore and wrecked at Granton.
Robert	United States	The ship was struck by lightning and caught fire in the English Channel and was abandoned. Her sixteen crew survived. She was on a voyage from New Orleans, Louisiana to Havre de Grâce. The wreck came ashore at Kimmeridge, Dorset on 10 December.
Rodeur	United Kingdom	The ship was driven ashore and wrecked near Dunbar. Her crew were rescued.
Rolus	United Kingdom	The ship was driven ashore at Poplar Point, Pembrokeshire. She was on a voyage from Waterford to Cardiff, Glamorgan.
Santa Anna	Spain	The schooner was driven ashore and severely damaged at Tarbert, Argyllshire, United Kingdom.
Shamrock	(United Kingdom of Great Britain and Ireland) New South Wales	The steamship ran aground at Port Phillip.
Solway	United Kingdom	The ship was driven ashore in the River Avon. She was on a voyage from Quebec City to Gloucester. Solway was refloated on 21 December and taken in to the Kingroad.
St. Lucia	United Kingdom	The brig was wrecked on the Herd Sand. Her crew were rescued.
Sylph	United Kingdom	The ship was wrecked on the Herd Sand. Her crew were rescued by a lifeboat. She was refloated on 26 December and taken in to South Shields, County Durham.
Thomas and Mary	United Kingdom	The brig ran aground on the Binks, off the mouth of the Humber. She was on a voyage from South Shields, County Durham to London. She was refloated the next day with assistance from the Spurn Lifeboat and beached at Grimsby, Lincolnshire in a derelict condition. Following temporary repairs, she was taken in to Hull, Yorkshire on 7 December.
Tontine	United Kingdom	The sloop was driven ashore and wrecked at Granton.
Venus	United Kingdom	The ship was sighted off the Blasket Islands, County Kerry whilst on a voyage from Tarbert to Bristol. No further trace, presumed foundered with the loss of all hands.

== 7 December ==
List of shipwrecks: 7 December 1847
Ship	State	Description
Agrimon	United Kingdom	The ship was driven ashore between Boscastle and Bude, Cornwall with the loss of a crew member. She was on a voyage from Liverpool, Lancashire to Limerick.
Bienfaisant	France	The chasse-marée was severely damaged at Margate, Kent, United Kingdom.
Brothers	United Kingdom	The schooner was driven ashore and wrecked at Peterhead, Aberdeenshire.
Caroline	United Kingdom	The brig was wrecked at Cardigan. All thirteen people on board were rescued. She was on a voyage from Saint John, New Brunswick, British North America to Liverpool. She was refloated on 9 February 1848 and taken in Cardigan.
Crocus	United Kingdom	The ship was driven ashore and wrecked north of Hartlepool, County Durham. She was on a voyage from Hamburg to Sunderland, County Durham.
Duca di Genova	Grand Duchy of Tuscany	The ship was driven ashore at Bridgwater, Somerset, United Kingdom.
Elizabeth	United Kingdom	The barque was wrecked on the Horse Shoe. She was on a voyage from Quebec City, Province of Canada, British North America to Hull, Yorkshire.
Fairy	United Kingdom	The brig was driven ashore near Rhyl, Denbighshire. She was on a voyage from Saint John, New Brunswick, British North America to Liverpool.
Felix	United Kingdom	The barque was driven against the quayside and damaged a Holyhead, Anglesey. She was on a voyage from Liverpool to Newport, Monmouthshire.
Flora	United Kingdom	The ship was driven ashore and damaged at Boulogne, Pas-de-Calais, France.
Flora	Hamburg	The ship was driven ashore on Sylt, Duchy of Holstein. Her crew were rescued. She was on a voyage from Hartlepool to the Elbe.
Frankfield	United Kingdom	The full-rigged ship was wrecked on the East Mouse Sand, in the Irish Sea 20 nautical miles (37 km) north east of Anglesey with the loss of twenty of her 28 crew. She was on a voyage from Liverpool to Callao, Peru.
Hellespont	United Kingdom	The brig was driven ashore and wrecked 4 nautical miles (7.4 km) south of Whitby, Yorkshire. Her crew were rescued.
John Whale	United Kingdom	The sloop was driven ashore and wrecked at Berwick upon Tweed, Northumberland. Her three crew survived. She was on a voyage from the River Tyne to Port Dundas, Renfrewshire.
Leven	United Kingdom	The ship was driven ashore at Fishguard, Pembrokeshire. She was on a voyage from Dublin to Llanelly, Glamorgan.
Lord Metcalfe	United Kingdom	The barque was driven ashore in the River Dee upstream of Aberdeen.
Luvions	United Kingdom	The ship was driven ashore and wrecked at Northam, Devon. Her crew were rescued. She was on a voyage from Cork to Cardiff.
Lydia	Norway	The ship was driven against the quayside and severely damaged at Tarragona, Spain. She was consequently beached and was declared a total loss.
Maria	United Kingdom	The ship ran aground and was damaged at Ramsey, Isle of Man. She was on a voyage from Newport to Carlisle, Cumberland.
Mistier	Spain	The ship was driven ashore and wrecked at Bilbao with the loss of all but one of her crew. She was on a voyage from Cádiz to "Roquefada".
Montreal	United Kingdom	The ship ran aground on the Herd Sand, in the North Sea off the coast of County Durham. Her crew were rescued. She became a wreck the next day.
Mozart	Bremen	The whaler struck a reef off Christmas Island and was wrecked. The crew were taken off the island by J. E. Donnell (United States) after a week. The tents, water and provisions they left behind were of great value to the survivors of the wreck of Maria Helena (Chile) which was wrecked on the island in January 1848.
Peggy	United Kingdom	The sloop was driven ashore and wrecked near Cramond, Lothian.
Royal Eagle	United Kingdom	The ship ran aground off Cowes, Isle of Wight. She was on a voyage from London to Waterford. She was refloated the next day.
Sir Alexander Duff	United Kingdom	The schooner was wrecked near Peterhead.
St. Lucia	United Kingdom	The ship ran aground and sank on the Herd Sand. Her crew were rescued.
Thomas	United Kingdom	The sloop was driven ashore at Scremerston, Northumberland. Her crew were rescued. She was on a voyage from Seaham, County Durham to Dundee, Forfarshire. Thomas was destroyed by fire a few days later.
Tyne	United Kingdom	The ship was wrecked near Berwick upon Tweed. Her crew were rescued.
William	United Kingdom	The schooner was driven ashore and wrecked at Yesnaby, Orkney Islands with the loss of a crew member. She was on a voyage from Newcastle upon Tyne, Northumberland to Dublin.
William Wright	United Kingdom	The ship was wrecked at Medea, Ottoman Empire with the loss of five of her crew.
Zenobia	United Kingdom	The ship ran aground on the Wurms Reef, in the Baltic Sea. She was on a voyage from Saint Petersburg, Russia to Liverpool. She was refloated and resumed her voyage.

== 8 December ==
List of shipwrecks: 8 December 1847
Ship	State	Description
Abdiel	United Kingdom	The ship was driven ashore at Holme-next-the-Sea, Norfolk with the loss of a crew member. She was on a voyage from London to Whitby, Yorkshire. She was refloated on 12 January 1848 and taken in to Wells-next-the-Sea, Norfolk.
Areta	United Kingdom	The ship ran aground at Smyrna, Ottoman Empire. She was on a voyage from Smyrna to London. She was refloated and resumed her voyage.
Commerce	France	The ship was lost near Vlissingen, Zeeland, Netherlands with the loss of three of her crew. She was on a voyage from Newcastle upon Tyne, Northumberland, United Kingdom to Marseille, Bouches-du-Rhône.
Marchioness of Abercorn	United Kingdom	The full-rigged ship was driven ashore at Cranstock, Cornwall with the loss of three of her 29 crew. Survivors were rescued by the smacks Liberty and Model and the schooner Ross (all United Kingdom. Marchioness of Abercorn was on a voyage from Quebec City, Province of Canada, British North America to London. She was dismantled in situ.
Mary and Jane	(United Kingdom of Great Britain and Ireland) Jersey	The cutter was driven ashore and wrecked at Jersey. All on board were rescued. She was on a voyage from Southampton, Hampshire to Jersey.
Oromocto	United Kingdom	The ship was wrecked on the Long Nose, off the coast of Kent.
Palestine	United Kingdom	The ship struck a sunken rock and sank in the Gulf of Finland off the Suross Lighthouse, Russia. Her crew were rescued. She was on a voyage from Saint Petersburg, Russia to London.
Perseverance	United Kingdom	The smack was in collision with the brig Kitty and sank in the Swin, off the coast of Essex. Her crew were rescued.
Thomas Handford	United Kingdom	The ship was driven ashore near the mouth of the River Avon. She was on a voyage from Richibucto, New Brunswick, British North America to Bristol, Gloucestershire.
Vesta	United Kingdom	The ship was driven ashore at Harwich, Essex. She was refloated and taken in to Harwich.

== 9 December ==
List of shipwrecks: 9 December 1847
Ship	State	Description
Adah	United Kingdom	The brig ran aground on the Gaa Sands, at the mouth of the River Tay. Her crew survived. She was on a voyage from Arkhangelsk, Russia to Dundee, Forfarshire.
Albion	United Kingdom	The ship was driven ashore at Aberdeen. She was on a voyage from Newcastle upon Tyne, Northumberland to Leith, Lothian. She was refloated on 13 December.
Alonzo	United Kingdom	The ship was driven ashore at Deal, Kent. She was on a voyage from South Shields, County Durham to Havre de Grâce, Seine-Inférieure, France. She was refloated.
Auchincruive	United Kingdom	The ship ran aground on the Barrows, in the North Sea off the coast of Essex. She was on a voyage from London to Glasgow, Renfrewshire. She was refloated and taken in to Harwich, Essex in a leaky condition.
Caroline Amelia	United Kingdom	The brig schooner was lost near Iviza, Spain.
Cicero	United Kingdom	The brig was in collision with Speculator (United Kingdom) and sank in the North Sea. Her crew were rescued. She was on a voyage from Sunderland, County Durham to London.
Dorothea	United Kingdom	The brig was driven ashore at Hartlepool, County Durham.
Duck	United Kingdom	The ship was driven ashore and sank near Islandmagee, County Antrim. Her crew were rescued.
Eclipse	United Kingdom	The ship struck the pier and sank at Ramsgate, Kent. She was on a voyage from Seaham, County Durham to Caen, Calvados, France.
Fanny	United Kingdom	The brig was in collision with Senhora (United Kingdom) and was abandoned in the English Channel off Hastings, Sussex. Her crew were rescued. A Boulogne fishing boat discovered her and put six hands on board. They were lost when she foundered.
Hartlepool Packet	United Kingdom	The ship was wrecked near Rotterdam, South Holland, Netherlands. Her crew were rescued. She was on a voyage from Hartlepool to Shoreham-by-Sea, Sussex.
Highlander	United Kingdom	The schooner ran aground at Kirkcaldy, Fife. She was refloated and put in to East Wemyss, Fife.
Orleans	United Kingdom	The ship was driven ashore at Port Talbot, Glamorgan. She was on a voyage from Cork to Port Talbot.
Parrsborough	United Kingdom	The ship was in collision with the paddle steamer Tynwald ( (United Kingdom of Great Britain and Ireland) Isle of Man) in the Belfast Lough and was consequently beached at Greenisland, County Antrim. She was refloated on 11 December and towed in to Belfast for repairs.
Pohja	(Russian Empire) Grand Duchy of Finland	The brig was wrecked on the Scroby Sands, Norfolk, United Kingdom. Her crew were rescued by the Great Yarmouth Lifeboat. She was on a voyage from Newcastle upon Tyne, Northumberland to Marseille, Bouches-du-Rhône, France.
Roseberry	United Kingdom	The ship departed from Helsingør for Liverpool. No further trace, presumed foundered with the loss of all hands.
St. Mungo	United Kingdom	The steam tug sank off Greenisland.
Tritonia	United Kingdom	The schooner was driven ashore on Terschelling, Friesland, Netherlands. She was on a voyage from Hamburg to Weymouth, Dorset.
Vine	United Kingdom	The brig ran aground on the Sunk Sand, in the North Sea. She was refloated and assisted in to Great Yarmouth, Norfolk by three smacks.

== 10 December ==
List of shipwrecks: 10 December 1847
Ship	State	Description
Abeille	French Navy	The brig of war was wrecked at Quita, Danish Gold Coast.
Barron	United Kingdom	The ship ran aground off "Ostgarn" Sweden. She was on a voyage from Saint Petersburg to Hull, Yorkshire. She was refloated the next day and taken in to "Kattkammerswik" for repairs.
Castries	United Kingdom	The ship departed from Beaumaris, Anglesey for Saint Lucia. She subsequently foundered off the coast of County Wexford, wreckage washed ashore on 4 January 1848.
Ellida	Norway	The ship departed from St. Ubes, Portugal for Bergen. No further trace, presumed foundered with the loss of all hands.
Johann	Prussia	The ship was driven ashore and wrecked at Helsingør, Denmark. She was on a voyage from Wolgast to King's Lynn, Norfolk, United Kingdom.
Libra	Hamburg	The ship was driven ashore near Tønning, Duchy of Holstein. Her crew were rescued. She was on a voyage from Altona to Dundee, Forfarshire, United Kingdom.
Manhattan	Netherlands	The ship was driven ashore in the Dardanelles. She was on a voyage from Odesa to Genoa, Kingdom of Sardinia. She was refloated on 12 December.
Ninian	United Kingdom	The ship was driven ashore and wrecked in Rapilly Bay, Glamorgan.
Pilgrim	United Kingdom	The ship was driven ashore at Ramsgate, Kent. She was on a voyage from Quebec City, Province of Canada, British North America to London. She was refloated on 13 December and was taken in tow for London.

== 11 December ==
List of shipwrecks: 11 December 1847
Ship	State	Description
Antilles	United Kingdom	The barque ran aground on the Gunfleet Sand, in the North Sea off the coast of Essex. She was on a voyage from Sunderland, County Durham to Rochester, Kent. She was refloated.
Argo	United Kingdom	The ship struck a sunken rock off Maio, Cape Verde Islands and was subsequently wrecked on that island. Her crew were rescued. She was on a voyage from Liverpool, Lancashire to Montevideo, Uruguay.
Britannia	United Kingdom	The brig was severely damaged by fire at City Point, Virginia, United States.
Commercial Packet	United Kingdom	The ship was driven ashore near Blackness Castle, Lothian.
Fifeshire	United Kingdom	The schooner was driven ashore at Winterton-on-Sea, Norfolk. She was on a voyage from Dordrecht, South Holland, Netherlands to Grangemouth, Stirlingshire. She was refloated and resumed her voyage.
Henrietta Mary	United Kingdom	The ship was abandoned in the Atlantic Ocean off Cape Clear Island, County Donegal with the loss of fourteen or fifteen of her 27 crew. Survivors were rescued by Caroline and Royal William (both United Kingdom). Henrietta Mary was on a voyage from Quebec City, Province of Canada, British North America to Liverpool. She was driven ashore and wrecked at Cork on 16 December.
Isabella	United Kingdom	The ship was abandoned in the Atlantic Ocean. Her crew were rescued by Loodianah (United Kingdom). Isabella was on a voyage from Quebec City to London.
Lord Glenelg	United Kingdom	The barque was driven ashore on Grand Manan, New Brunswick, British North America.
Margaret	United Kingdom	The ship struck a sunken rock and foundered in the English Channel off Alderney, Channel Islands. Her crew were rescued. She was on a voyage from Guernsey, Channel Islands to London.
Mary Ann	(United Kingdom of Great Britain and Ireland) British North America	The ship was wrecked on Cape Sable Island, Nova Scotia. She was on a voyage from Kingston, Jamaica to Halifax, Nova Scotia.
Ontario	United Kingdom	The ship caught fire and was scuttled at New Orleans, Louisiana.
Rover's Bride	United Kingdom	The smack was driven ashore in Camiscross Bay. She was on a voyage from Loch Ouver to the Clyde.

== 12 December ==
List of shipwrecks: 12 December 1847
Ship	State	Description
Betty and Mary	United Kingdom	The ship ran aground on the Hever Knob. She was on a voyage from Grangemouth, Stirlingshire to Rotterdam, South Holland, Netherlands. She was refloated and taken in to Amrum, Duchy of Holstein.
Consort	United Kingdom	The ship was wrecked on the Sandhamn Reef, in the Baltic Sea. She was on a voyage from Saint Petersburg, Russia to Hull, Yorkshire.
James and Arabella	(United Kingdom of Great Britain and Ireland) British North America	The schooner was wrecked at Holyrood, Newfoundland. Her crew were rescued. She was on a voyage from Prince Edward Island to Saint John's, Newfoundland.
Oscar	United Kingdom	The ship was wrecked on Whalsay, Shetland Islands. Her crew were rescued. She was on a voyage from Gothenburg, Sweden to Hull.
Watkins	United Kingdom	The ship ran aground on the North Reef, off Antigua. She was on a voyage from Liverpool, Lancashire to Havana, Cuba. She was refloated the next day and resumed her voyage.

== 13 December ==
List of shipwrecks: 13 December 1847
Ship	State	Description
Angeline	United Kingdom	The ship ran around on the Platters Sand, in the North Sea. She was on a voyage from Sunderland, County Durham to London. She was refloated and taken in to Harwich, Essex.
Intrepid	United Kingdom	The brig struck the Rass Rock and foundered off Land's End, Cornwall. Her ten crew were rescued by the schooner William (United Kingdom). Intrepid was on a voyage from Havre de Grâce, Seine-Inférieure, France to Pembrey, Pembrokeshire.
Ionetta	Kingdom of Hanover	The ship ran aground and was damaged at Bongsiel and was subsequently frozen in by ice. She was still aground on 26 December.
Java Packet	Netherlands	The East Indiaman, a barque, was wrecked near Muntok, Netherlands East Indies.
Margaret	United Kingdom	The ship was driven ashore near Thisted, Denmark. She was on a voyage from Riga, Russia to Hull, Yorkshire. She had become a wreck by 3 January 1848.
Maria	United Kingdom	The ship struck the quayside and was damaged at Douglas, Isle of Man. She was put under repair.
Mary Lyon	United Kingdom	The ship ran aground on the Gunfleet Sand, in the North Sea of the coast of Essex. She was on a voyage from London to Sunderland. She was refloated and assisted in to Harwich by several smacks.
Nightingale	(United Kingdom of Great Britain and Ireland) Antigua	The sloop was sighted off Barbuda whilst on a voyage from Saint Kitts to Antigua. No further trace, presumed foundered with the loss of all hands.
William	United Kingdom	The ship ran aground on Aughrass Point. She was on a voyage from Sligo to Westport, County Mayo. She was refloated and put in to Killybegs, County Donegal.

== 14 December ==
List of shipwrecks: 14 December 1847
Ship	State	Description
Anna Rosalie	France	The ship was lost near Southampton, Hampshire, United Kingdom.
Atlas	United Kingdom	The schooner was wrecked at Regnéville-sur-Mer, Manche, France.
Emma de Rosalie	France	The ship was beached at Skinningrove, Yorkshire, United Kingdom. Her crew were rescued. She was on a voyage from Sunderland, County Durham to Nantes, Loire-Inférieure.
Fortitude	United Kingdom	The ship was holed by an anchor and sank at Hubberstone Pill, Pembrokeshire. She was on a voyage from Newport, Monmouthshire to Cork.
Hope	Netherlands	The ship departed from Liverpool, Lancashire, United Kingdom for Rotterdam, South Holland. No further trace, presumed foundered with the loss of all hands.
Isabella	United Kingdom	The ship was driven ashore and severely damaged at Strangford, County Antrim. Her crew were rescued. She was on a voyage from Liverpool, Lancashire to Newry, County Antrim. She was refloated on 7 January 1848 and take in to Strangford.
John Pink	United Kingdom	The ship was driven ashore at Deal, Kent. She was on a voyage from London to Jamaica. She was refloated.
Marchioness of Bute	United Kingdom	The ship ran aground and was wrecked off Cooley Point, County Louth. Her crew survived. She was on a voyage from Liverpool, Lancashire to Mobile, Alabama, United States.
Mary	United Kingdom	The ship sank 15 nautical miles (28 km) off the Smalls Lighthouse. Four crew were rescued. She was on a voyage from Newport, Monmouthshire to Maryport, Cumberland.
Mary Ann	United Kingdom	The ship struck a sunken rock off Islay, capsized and sank. Her crew were rescued. She was on a voyage from Liverpool to Perth.
Pomona Packet	United Kingdom	The sloop was driven ashore and wrecked near Canisbay, Caithness with the loss of two of her crew.
Temporatio	Netherlands	The ship departed from Riga, Russia for Leer, Kingdom of Hanover. No further trace, presumed foundered with the loss of all hands.
Thomas Wood	United Kingdom	The ship was driven ashore on Kaltskar, Russia. She was on a voyage from Kronstadt, Russia to Hull, Yorkshire. She was refloated and put in to Reval, Russia.
Twe Gebroeders	Netherlands	The ship was lost off Norden, Kingdom of Hanover. Her crew were rescued. She was on a voyage from Bremen to Amsterdam, North Holland.

== 15 December ==
List of shipwrecks: 15 December 1847
Ship	State	Description
Cleveland	United Kingdom	The barque ran aground at Whitby, Yorkshire. She was refloated.
USRC Crawford	United States Revenue Cutter Service	The Morris-Taney-class cutter was wrecked in Block Island Sound off Gardiners Point, New York.
Dandy Jim	(United Kingdom of Great Britain and Ireland) British North America	The ship was driven ashore near Sydney, Nova Scotia. She was on a voyage from Newfoundland to Sydney.
Eken	Sweden	The ship was driven ashore at "Hoals". She was on a voyage from St. Ubes, Portugal to Gothenburg. She was refloated the next day.
Emma	France	The brig was in collision with Warrior (United Kingdom) and sank with the loss of five of her eight crew. Survivors were rescued by Warrior. Emma was on a voyage from Galaţi, Ottoman Empire to Falmouth, Cornwall, United Kingdom.
Endeavour	United Kingdom	The schooner was destroyed by fire in the River Tees.
European	(United Kingdom of Great Britain and Ireland) British North America	The ship was driven ashore and wrecked on the coast of County Down. Her crew were rescued. She was on a voyage from Liverpool to Greenock, Renfrewshire.
Felicidade	Brazil	The ship was driven ashore and wrecked on the Ilha de Jaios, off Rio de Janeiro. Her crew were rescued. She was on a voyage from Ro de Janeiro to Africa.
Henry Tanner	United Kingdom	The ship sprang a leak and was beached at Demerara, British Guiana.
Isabella	United Kingdom	The schooner was wrecked on Gunners Isle, County Antrim. Her four crew were rescued. She was on a voyage from Liverpool to Newry, County Antrim.
Mermaid	United Kingdom	The schooner was driven ashore and wrecked in Freshwater Bay, Pembrokeshire. Her crew were rescued. She was on a voyage from Newport, Monmouthshire to Wexford.
Nancy	United Kingdom	The schooner was driven ashore and wrecked at Clonakilty, County Cork with the loss of all but one of her crew. She was on a voyage from Ibrail, Ottoman Empire to Cork.
New Hunter	(United Kingdom of Great Britain and Ireland) British North America	The ship was lost near Sydney, Nova Scotia.
Portia	United Kingdom	The ship was driven ashore and wrecked near Torlin-by-Lamlash, Isle of Arran. Her crew were rescued. She was on a voyage from Málaga, Spain to Glasgow, Renfrewshire.
Sir Joseph Banks	United Kingdom	The schooner was driven ashore and wrecked at the entrance to the Sound of Islay. Her crew survived. She was on a voyage from Liverpool, Lancashire to Perth.
Susanna	United Kingdom	The ship sank west of the Smalls Lighthouse with the ultimate loss of five of her nine crew. She was on a voyage from Newport, Monmouthshire to Cork.

== 16 December ==
List of shipwrecks: 16 December 1847
Ship	State	Description
Betties	United Kingdom	The ship was driven ashore and wrecked at Wicklow.
Briton	United Kingdom	The ship was driven ashore at Dublin. She was on a voyage from Newport, Monmouthshire to Dublin. She was refloated with assistance from Arran Castle (United Kingdom) and towed in to Dublin.
Diana	France	The ship was wrecked on Rodrigues, Mauritius. Her crew were rescued. She was on a voyage from Calcutta, India to Dunkirk, Nord.
Earl Vane	United Kingdom	The ship ran aground on the Gunfleet Sand, in the North Sea off the coast of Essex. She became a wreck on 18 December. Her crew were rescued. She was on a voyage from Sunderland to London.
Energy	United Kingdom	The ship was driven ashore and damaged at Limerick. She was on a voyage from Miramichi, New Brunswick, British North America to Limerick. She was refloated on 18 December and taken in to Limerick.
Four Sisters	United Kingdom	The ship was driven ashore at Cairnryan, Wigtownshire.
Helena	United Kingdom	The barque was wrecked on North Ronaldsay, Orkney Islands with the loss of eight of her crew. She was on a voyage from Dundee, Forfarshire to New York, United States.
Jane	United Kingdom	The ship was driven ashore and wrecked at Poor Head, County Cork. Her crew were rescued. She was on a voyage from Newport, Monmouthshire to Cork.
Mystery	United Kingdom	The brig was wrecked at Waterford. Her crew were rescued. She was on a voyage from Ibrail, Ottoman Empire to Galway.
Reindeer	United Kingdom	The schooner was driven ashore on Puffin Island, Anglesey. Her crew were rescued.
Star	United Kingdom	The ship was driven ashore and wrecked at Salcombe, Devon with the loss of eight of her nine crew. She was on a voyage from London to Antigua.
Sunderland	United Kingdom	The brig was driven ashore on the island of Worms, Russia.
Traveller	United Kingdom	The schooner collided with another schooner and sank in the North Sea off Winterton-on-Sea, Norfolk. Her crew were rescued by Hope (United Kingdom). Traveller was on a voyage from Rouen, Seine-Inférieure, France to Newcastle upon Tyne, Northumberland.

== 17 December ==
List of shipwrecks: 17 December 1847
Ship	State	Description
Amazon	United Kingdom	The ship was wrecked at Gun Point, County Cork. She was on a voyage from Quebec City, Province of Canada, British North America to Waterford.
Benin	United Kingdom	The ship was driven ashore and wrecked in Ballinseelbegs Bay, County Kerry with the loss of three of her crew. She was on a voyage from Benin City to Liverpool, Lancashire.
Bessy	(United Kingdom of Great Britain and Ireland) British North America	The schooner sprang a leak and was consequently beached at Ramsey, Isle of Man. She was on a voyage from Liverpool to Douglas, Isle of Man. She was refloated on 22 December and taken in to Ramsey.
Britannia	United Kingdom	The ship was driven ashore at Workington, Cumberland. She was refloated on 21 December and towed in to Whitehaven, Cumberland.
Cygnet	United Kingdom	The ship was wrecked on the Haisborough Sands, in the North Sea off the coast of Norfolk. Her crew were rescued. She was on a voyage from Hamburg to London.
Emerenzia	Trieste	The ship ran aground on the Brake Sand. She was on a voyage from Antwerp, Belgium to Trieste. She was refloated and put in to Ramsgate, Kent, United Kingdom in a leaky condition.
Falconer	United States	The ship was wrecked at Ipswich, Massachusetts with the loss of nineteen lives. She was on a voyage from Sydney, Nova Scotia, British North America to Boston, Massachusetts.
Four Sisters	United Kingdom	The ship was driven ashore near Cairnryan, Wigtownshire.
Ida	United Kingdom	The schooner was driven ashore and wrecked at Tyrella, County Down with the loss of all six hands. She was on a voyage from Runcorn, Cheshire to Newry, County Antrim.
Kate	United Kingdom	The schooner was wrecked near Clonakilty, County Cork. Her crew were rescued by rocket apparatus. She was on a voyage from St. Ives, Cornwall to Livorno, Kingdom of Sardinia.
Lady Anne	United Kingdom	The ship was driven ashore at Tynemouth, Northumberland. Her crew were rescued. She was on a voyage from Wells-next-the-Sea to North Shields. She was refloated on 26 December and taken in to South Shields.
Mary	United Kingdom	The ship was driven ashore and severely damaged at Carrickfergus, County Antrim. She was on a voyage from Liverpool to Africa.
Norna	United Kingdom	The ship was driven ashore at "Staplebottom" before 7 December. She was on a voyage from Saint Petersburg, Russia to Hull. She floated off and drifted out to sea, and was subsequently taken in to Helsinki, Grand Duchy of Finland, where she arrived on 14 December. She was declared unrepairable.
Wellington	United Kingdom	The ship was driven ashore at Workington. She was refloated on 23 December and towed in to Workington in a severely damaged condition.
Wexford Packet	United Kingdom	The smack was driven ashore and wrecked at Beaumaris, Anglesey. She was on a voyage from Wicklow to Liverpool.

== 18 December ==
List of shipwrecks: December 1847
Ship	State	Description
Ajax	United Kingdom	The steamship was driven ashore at Cork. She was on a voyage from Cork to London.
Alexander	United Kingdom	The ship was driven ashore at Greenisland, County Antrim. She was on a voyage from Liverpool, Lancashire to Dublin.
Ann	United Kingdom	The brig sank at Sunderland, County Durham.
Ann Jones	United Kingdom	The schooner was driven ashore in the Belfast Lough.
Ann Paley	United Kingdom	The ship was driven ashore at Carrickfergus, County Antrim. She was on a voyage from Liverpool, Lancashire to Porto, Portugal. She was refloated on 20 December and towed in to Belfast.
Belmont	United Kingdom	The paddle tug was wrecked at Sunderland. Later repaired and returned to service.
Betts	United Kingdom	The ship was damaged at Sunderland.
Brothers	United Kingdom	The smack sank at Sunderland with the loss of a crew member.
Cambridge	United Kingdom	The ship was driven ashore at Tynemouth, Northumberland. Her crew were rescued. She was on a voyage from London to North Shields, County Durham.
Camilla	France	The schooner was driven ashore and wrecked at Sunderland. Her crew were rescued. She was on a voyage from Boston to Sunderland.
Chronometer	United Kingdom	The ship was driven ashore at Smyrna, Ottoman Empire. She was on a voyage from Smyrna to Liverpool. She was refloated and resumed her voyage.
Content	United Kingdom	The ship was damaged at Sunderland.
Elise	Stettin	The ship was damaged at Sunderland.
Emma	United Kingdom	The schooner was damaged at Sunderland.
Exertion	United Kingdom	The ship was damaged at Sunderland.
Express	United Kingdom	The ship was damaged at Sunderland.
Falconer	United Kingdom	The ship was damaged at Sunderland.
Ganges	United Kingdom	The ship was driven ashore and wrecked at Greenisland, County Antrim. Her crew were rescued. She was on a voyage from Liverpool, Lancashire to New Orleans, Louisiana, United States.
Good Hope	United Kingdom	The ship was driven ashore on Heligoland and was abandoned by her crew. Shew as on a voyage from Cardiff, Glamorgan to Brake, Kingdom of Hanover.
Humber	United Kingdom	The full-rigged ship was wrecked 2 nautical miles (3.7 km) from Nesting, Shetland Islands. Her six crew were rescued.
Isabella	United Kingdom	The ship was driven ashore and severely damaged at Gunn's Island, County Down.
James	United Kingdom	The ship was driven ashore at Tynemouth. Her crew were rescued. She was on a voyage from Great Yarmouth, Norfolk to North Shields. She was refloated on 22 December and taken in to the River Tyne for repairs.
Lady Peel	United Kingdom	The ship was damaged at Sunderland.
Leo	United Kingdom	The brig was damaged at Sunderland.
Leon	United Kingdom	The ship was driven ashore at Belfast.
Louisa Ann	United Kingdom	The schooner was damaged at Sunderland.
Mary	United Kingdom	The ship was driven ashore at Belfast. She was on a voyage from Liverpool to Africa.
Mary and Elizabeth	United Kingdom	The ship was driven ashore and wrecked at Sunderland.
Miriam	United Kingdom	The ship was damaged at Sunderland.
Nautilus	United Kingdom	The ship was damaged at Sunderland.
Newton	United Kingdom	The ship was damaged at Sunderland.
Rontho	United Kingdom	The brig was wrecked at Peterhead, Aberdeenshire with the loss of all fifteen people on board. She was on a voyage from Sunderland to Aberdeen.
Seaflower	United Kingdom	The ship was damaged at Sunderland.
Stephen	United Kingdom	The ship was damaged at Sunderland.
Triton	United Kingdom	The schooner was driven ashore in the Belfast Lough.
Vine	United Kingdom	The ship was driven ashore and damaged at Tynemouth. Her crew were rescued. She was on a voyage from London to North Shields. She was refloated on 26 December and taken in to South Shields.
Voyevaar	Netherlands	The ship ran aground on Saaremaa, Russia and sank. Her crew were rescued. She was on a voyage from Saint Petersburg, Russia to Amsterdam, North Holland.
William and Charles	United Kingdom	The schooner capsized and sank at Sunderland. Her crew were rescued.

== 19 December ==
List of shipwrecks: 19 December 1847
Ship	State	Description
Alston	United Kingdom	The ship was damaged at Sunderland, County Durham.
Argo	United Kingdom	The ship was damaged at Sunderland.
Astrea	United Kingdom	The ship departed from Odesa, Russian Empire for an English port. No further trace, presumed foundered with the loss of all hands.
Belford	United Kingdom	The ship was damaged at Sunderland.
Benton	United Kingdom	The ship was damaged at Sunderland.
Caledonia	United Kingdom	The ship was damaged at Sunderland.
Ceres	United Kingdom	The ship was damaged at Sunderland.
Clarendon	United Kingdom	The ship was driven ashore on Fetlar, Shetland Islands. Her crew were rescued. She was on a voyage from Miramichi, New Brunswick, British North America to Leith, Lothian.
Cleadon	United Kingdom	The ship was damaged at Sunderland.
Cornucopia	United Kingdom	The ship was damaged at Sunderland.
Dolphin	(United Kingdom of Great Britain and Ireland) British North America	The ship was wrecked in the Great Bras d'Or Channel. She was on a voyage from Sydney, Nova Scotia to Halifax, Nova Scotia.
Eleanor	United Kingdom	The ship was damaged at Sunderland.
Elizabeth	United Kingdom	The ship was damaged at Sunderland.
Elizabeth	United Kingdom	The ship was damaged at Sunderland.
Ellison	United Kingdom	The ship was damaged at Sunderland.
Energy	United Kingdom	The ship was damaged at Sunderland.
Exquisite	United Kingdom	The ship was damaged at Sunderland.
Flambeau	United Kingdom	The paddle tug collided with the Mersey Ferry Wirral (United Kingdom) and sank in the River Mersey. Her crew were rescued by Thomas Stanley (United Kingdom).
Ford	United Kingdom	The ship was damaged at Sunderland.
Great Britain	United Kingdom	The ship was damaged at Sunderland.
Harmony	Norway	The ship was wrecked on Yell, Shetland Islands, United Kingdom. She was on a voyage from Bergen to Venice, Kingdom of Lombardy–Venetia.
Henrietta	United Kingdom	The barque was wrecked at Start Point, Sanday, Orkney Islands with the loss of all hands, at least nine lives. She was on a voyage from Riga, Russia to Montrose, Forfarshire.
Hiram	United Kingdom	The ship was damaged at Sunderland.
Hylton	United Kingdom	The ship was driven ashore and damaged at Sunderland.
Johanna Hermann	Hamburg	The ship was driven ashore in Tor Bay. All on board were rescued. She was on a voyage from Hamburg to Sierra Leone. She capsized the next day and was wrecked.
Lady Mary	United Kingdom	The ship was damaged at Sunderland.
Lark	United Kingdom	The ship was damaged at Sunderland.
Louisa	United Kingdom	The schooner was driven ashore at Sunderland.
Lumley	United Kingdom	The ship was damaged at Sunderland.
Magnet	United Kingdom	The ship was driven ashore north of Skagen, Denmark. She was on a voyage from Ventava, Courland Governorate to Grimsby, Lincolnshire. She was refloated on 22 December and resumed her voyage.
Marys	United Kingdom	The ship was damaged at Sunderland.
Myrtle	United Kingdom	The ship was damaged at Sunderland.
Radical	United Kingdom	The ship was damaged at Sunderland.
Raisbeck	United Kingdom	The ship was damaged at Sunderland.
Richardson	United Kingdom	The ship was damaged at Sunderland.
Royal Oak	United Kingdom	The ship was damaged at Sunderland.
Sarah Clark	United Kingdom	The ship was damaged at Sunderland.
Sceptre	United Kingdom	The ship was damaged at Sunderland.
Spring	United Kingdom	The sloop was wrecked in Wigtown Bay. She was on a voyage from Newry, County Antrim to Runcorn, Cheshire.
Tay	United Kingdom	The ship was damaged at Sunderland.
Thomas Barker	United Kingdom	The ship was damaged at Sunderland.
Trio	United States	The ship departed from New York for Palermo, Sicily. No further trace, presumed foundered with the loss of all hands.
Union	United Kingdom	The ship was severely damaged at Sunderland.
Veronica	(United Kingdom of Great Britain and Ireland) British North America	The ship was wrecked in Colville Bay.
Visitant	United Kingdom	The ship was damaged at Sunderland.
Vivid	United Kingdom	The ship was damaged at Sunderland.
Union	United Kingdom	The ship was severely damaged at Sunderland.
Wilhelmina Hendrika	Netherlands	The ship was driven ashore and wrecked at Cullercoats, Northumberland, United Kingdom. Her crew were rescued. She was on a voyage from Harlingen, Friesland to Newcastle upon Tyne, Northumberland.
Willey	United Kingdom	The ship was severely damaged at Sunderland.

== 20 December ==
List of shipwrecks: 20 December 1847
Ship	State	Description
Adele	France	The brig was driven ashore and wrecked on South Ronaldsay, Orkney Islands, United Kingdom with the loss of three of her eleven crew. She was on a voyage from Antwerp, Belgium to Newcastle upon Tyne, Northumberland, United Kingdom.
HMS Avenger	Royal Navy	HMS Avenger. The frigate was wrecked on the Sorelle Rocks, off the coast of Malta with the loss of 242 of her 250 crew.
Brothers	United Kingdom	The smack sank at Sunderland, County Durham.
Despatch	United Kingdom	The ship was beached in Millin Bay. She was refloated on 20 December.
Fairplay	United Kingdom	The schooner was wrecked in Liverpool Bay.
Flora	United Kingdom	The sloop was run into and sunk at Corran Ferry, Inverness-shire by Duntroon Castle (United Kingdom). Her crew were rescued.
Lady Brougham	United Kingdom	The ship was driven ashore and severely damaged at Holyhead, Anglesey. She was on a voyage from Liverpool, Lancashire to Santander, Spain. She was refloated.
Lark	United Kingdom	The ship was driven ashore at Dundalk, County Louth. She was refloated on 8 January 1848 and taken in to Dundalk in a severely damaged condition.
Lavinia	United Kingdom	The ship was driven ashore at the Mumbles, Glamorgan.
Margaret and Ann	(United Kingdom of Great Britain and Ireland) Jersey	The sloop was driven ashore at Gourdon, Aberdeenshire. Her crew were rescued. She was on a voyage from Jersey to Aberdeen. She subsequently became a wreck.
Pictou and Boston Packet	United Kingdom	The ship was driven ashore on South Uist, Outer Hebrides. She was on a voyage from Limerick to Glasgow, Renfrewshire.
Queen	United Kingdom	The ship was abandoned in the North Sea. Her crew were rescued by Johan Frederick (Prussia). Queen was on a voyage from Riga, Russia to Portsmouth, Hampshire.

== 21 December ==
List of shipwrecks: 21 December 1847
Ship	State	Description
Ann	United Kingdom	The ship was driven ashore at Whitby, Yorkshire. She was refloated on 22 December.
Bubona	United Kingdom	The ship ran aground off Helsingør, Denmark. She was on a voyage from Saint Petersburg, Russia to Bristol, Gloucestershire. She was refloated the next day and resumed her voyage.
Catherina Margaretha	Kingdom of Hanover	The ship was driven ashore at Carolinensiel.
Catherine	United Kingdom	The ship sank in the River Welland. The wreck was removed in late May 1848.
Fair Play	United Kingdom	The ship was wrecked on Rabbit Island, County Cork.
Johannes	Hamburg	The galiot foundered in the North Sea off Peterhead, Aberdeenshire, United Kingdom. Her crew were rescued by the galiot Maria (Hamburg). Johannes was on a voyage from Lübeck to Grangemouth, Stirlingshire, United Kingdom.
Lisette	Sweden	The barque was driven ashore in the Elbe downstream of Schulan. She was on a voyage from Calcutta, India to Hamburg. She was refloated and taken to the Lühe.
Tipula	Ottoman Empire	The ship ran aground near Gallipoli. She was on a voyage from Constantinople to Falmouth, Cornwall, United Kingdom. She was refloated and resumed her voyage.
Vargas	Spain	The brig ran aground and was damaged at Cuxhaven. She was on a voyage from Havana, Cuba to Hamburg. She was refloated.
Violet	United Kingdom	The ship was wrecked on the Galt Rock, off Shapinsay, Orkney Islands. She was on a voyage from Saint Petersburg, Russia to Liverpool, Lancashire.

== 22 December ==
List of shipwrecks: 22 December 1847
Ship	State	Description
Acorn	United Kingdom	The ship was driven ashore at Carrickfergus, County Antrim. She was refloated on 25 December and towed in to Belfast.
Catherine	United Kingdom	The schooner capsized in the River Welland. She was on a voyage from Newport, Monmouthshire to Boston, Lincolnshire.
Clyde	United Kingdom	The ship was driven ashore and wrecked on Achill Island, County Mayo. Her crew were rescued. She was on a voyage from Troon, Ayrshire to Westport, County Mayo.
Mary	United Kingdom	The ship was driven ashore at Carrickfergus. She was refloated on 25 December and towed in to Belfast.
Mary and Jane	United Kingdom	The tug sank at Whitby, Yorkshire whilst assisting in the refloating of Ann Gales (United Kingdom).
Prins Carl	Flag unknown	The ship ran aground in the River Usk. She was on a voyage from Newport, Monmouthshire to Havana, Cuba.
Rubina	United Kingdom	The ship ran aground on the Dragoe Reef. She was on a voyage from Saint Petersburg, Russia to Bristol, Gloucestershire.
Speedwell	United Kingdom	The ship was wrecked at Penzance, Cornwall. Her crew were rescued.
Varel	Hamburg	The ship was driven ashore on Scharhörn. She was on a voyage from Newcastle upon Tyne, Northumberland, United Kingdom to Hamburg. She was refloated on 25 December and taken in to Cuxhaven.
Vestnik (Вестник, 'Herald')	Imperial Russian Navy	The schooner became unmanageable due to frozen rigging and sails, and was driven ashore and subsequently wrecked 8 nautical miles (15 km) from the Tarkhankut Lighthouse, with the loss of one crew member. She was on a voyage from Greece to Sevastopol.

== 23 December ==
List of shipwrecks: 23 December 1847
Ship	State	Description
Alexander	Russia	The ship ran aground on the Dragoe Reef, off the coast of Denmark. She was on a voyage from Saint Petersburg to Liverpool, Lancashire, United Kingdom. She was refloated on 25 December and taken in to Copenhagen.
Friends	United Kingdom	The ship foundered. Her crew were rescued by Liberty (United Kingdom). Friends was on a voyage from Tralee, County Kerry to Liverpool.
Garonne	United Kingdom	The ship was severely damaged by fire whilst under repair at Swansea, Glamorgan.
Industry	United Kingdom	The ship ran aground on the Gunfleet Sand, in the North Sea off the coast of Essex. She was on a voyage from London to Sunderland, County Durham. She was refloated the next day with assistance from three smacks and resumed her voyage.
Johns	United Kingdom	The ship was driven ashore in the River Shannon. She was on a voyage from Limerick to Glasgow, Renfrewshire. She was refloated and put back to Limerick.
Nancy	United Kingdom	The schooner was driven ashore and wrecked near Clonakilty, County Cork with the loss of all but one of her crew. She was on a voyage from Ibrail, Ottoman Empire to Cork.
Sarah	(United Kingdom of Great Britain and Ireland) Isle of Man	The schooner ran aground on the Callick Rock, off the Isle of Skye, Outer Hebrides. She was on a voyage from Liverpool, Lancashire to Montrose, Forfarshire.

== 24 December ==
List of shipwrecks: 24 December 1847
Ship	State	Description
Earl Grey	United Kingdom	The schooner foundered in the Swin, off the coast of Essex. Her crew were rescued by Charles (United Kingdom). Earl Grey was on a voyage from Great Yarmouth, Norfolk to London. She was refloated on 2 April 1848 and taken in to Burnham-on-Crouch, Essex.
Elizabeth	United Kingdom	The ship ran aground on the Cross Sand, in the North Sea off the coast of Norfolk. She was on a voyage from London to Newcastle upon Tyne, Northumberland. She was refloated and taken in to Great Yarmouth in a leaky condition.
Favourite	(United Kingdom of Great Britain and Ireland) Jersey	The shallop was abandoned off Perth by all but her captain of her four crew. They drowned when their boat capsized. Favourite was subsequently taken in to Perth.
René	France	The ship was driven ashore and wrecked on Guernsey, Channel Islands. Her crew were rescued. She was on a voyage from Saint-Malo, Ille-et-Vilaine to Bordeaux, Gironde.
Venus	United Kingdom	The ship was driven ashore near Falsterbo, Sweden. She was on a voyage from Saint Petersburg, Russia to London. She broke up on 26 December.

== 25 December ==
List of shipwrecks: 25 December 1847
Ship	State	Description
Caroline	Lübeck	The ship was wrecked on the Buxey Sand, in the North Sea off the coast of Essex, United Kingdom. She was on a voyage from Vyborg, Grand Duchy of Finland to Bordeaux, Gironde, France. Caroline was refloated and towed in to Brightlingsea, Essex.
Cybele	United Kingdom	The ship was severely damaged by fire in the Atlantic Ocean (47°50′N 16°30′W) with the loss of two of her crew.
Margaret Walker	(United Kingdom of Great Britain and Ireland) British North America	The ship was driven ashore on Panmure Island, Prince Edward Island and was abandoned by her crew. She was refloated on 8 January 1848 and taken in to Charlottetown.
Njord	Norway	The brig collided with Virginia (United States) and sank in the English Channel.
Priscilla	United Kingdom	The ship ran aground and capsized on the Whitaker Sand, in the North Sea off the coast of Essex. She was on a voyage from Great Yarmouth, Norfolk to London.
Queen of the Isles	United Kingdom	The ship ran aground on the Bridground, off the coast of Denmark. She was on a voyage from Saint Petersburg, Russia to King's Lynn, Norfolk.
Sirene	Stettin	The ship was driven ashore on the coast of Friesland, Netherlands with the loss of three of her crew. She was on a voyage from Liverpool, Lancashire, United Kingdom to Hamburg.

== 26 December ==
List of shipwrecks: 26 December 1847
Ship	State	Description
Hugo	Stettin	The ship ran aground on the Kentish Knock. She was on a voyage from Stettin to Bordeaux, Gironde, France. She was refloated with assistance from Agenoria (United Kingdom) and HMRC Scout ( Board of Customs) and towed in to Harwich, Essex, United Kingdom in a leaky condition.
Johannes	Lübeck	The ship sank in the North Sea off Leith, Lothian, United Kingdom.
Orion	United Kingdom	The barque was wrecked at Trepassey, Newfoundland, British North America. Her crew were rescued. She was on a voyage from London to a port in New Brunswick, British North America.
Svanen	Denmark	The ship departed from Hartlepool, County Durham, United Kingdom for Nyborg. No further trace, presumed foundered with the loss of all hands.

== 27 December ==
List of shipwrecks: 27 December 1847
Ship	State	Description
Comet	United Kingdom	The schooner was in collision with the barque Midlothian and sank in the Atlantic Ocean. Her crew were rescued by Midlothian (United Kingdom). Comet was on a voyage from Whitstable, Kent to São Miguel Island, Azores.
John Weavil	United Kingdom	The schooner was damaged by fire at Saint Sampson, Guernsey.
Meg Lee	United Kingdom	The ship was driven ashore near Scutari, Ottoman Empire. She was on a voyage from Liverpool, Lancashire to Constantinople, Ottoman Empire.
Tamar	United Kingdom	The ship was damaged by fire at London.

== 28 December ==
List of shipwrecks: 28 December 1847
Ship	State	Description
Amelia	United Kingdom	The brig was wrecked off Nesting, Shetland Islands. Her crew were rescued. She was on a voyage from Kronstadt, Russia to the Clyde.
Friendship	United Kingdom	The ship was abandoned in the Norwegian Sea off Tromsø and was presumed to have subsequently foundered. Her crew were rescued.
Pembroke Castle	United Kingdom	The ship foundered in the Atlantic Ocean (49°10′N 10°20′W). Her crew rescued by Joanna and Lady Lifford (both United Kingdom). Pembroke Castle was on a voyage from Cardiff, Glamorgan to Limerick.
Union	United Kingdom	The ship was driven ashore at Swansea, Glamorgan. She was on a voyage from Jersey, Channel Islands to Newport, Monmouthshire.

== 29 December ==
List of shipwrecks: 29 December 1847
Ship	State	Description
Earl of Aberdeen	United Kingdom	The ship was driven ashore at Peterhead, Aberdeenshire. She was on a voyage from Aberdeen to Sunderland, County Durham.
Industry	United Kingdom	The ship was driven ashore on the north coast of Bute. She was on a voyage from Castle Toward to Tarbert, Argyllshire. She was refloated with assistance from HMRC Princess Royal ( Board of Customs) and beached at Bowmore, Islay, where she subsequently broke her back.
Llan Rumney	United Kingdom	The ship was driven ashore and wrecked at Atherfield, Isle of Wight. Her fourteen crew were rescued, but two fisherman were lost whilst rendering assistance. She was on a voyage from St. John's, Newfoundland, British North America to London.
Mary Isabella	United Kingdom	The brig collided with Mary Caroline ( (United Kingdom of Great Britain and Ireland) British North America) and sank in the English Channel 25 nautical miles (46 km) south west of Start Point, Devon. Her crew were rescued by Mary Caroline. Mary Isabella was on a voyage from Cardiff, Glamorgan to London.
Molly Bawn	United Kingdom	The barque ran aground on the Kish Bank, in the Irish Sea. She was refloated but then ran aground and sank at Kingstown, County Dublin. Her crew were rescued. She was on a voyage from Liverpool, Lancashire to Valparaíso, Chile.
Olive	United Kingdom	The ship was driven ashore 12 nautical miles (22 km) south of Campbeltown, Argyllshire.
Robert and Mary	United Kingdom	The ship ran aground on the Long Nose, off the coast of Kent. She was on a voyage from King's Lynn, Norfolk to Plymouth, Devon. She was refloated the next day.
Sarah	United Kingdom	The schooner ran aground on the Horse Bank, in Liverpool Bay. She was on a voyage from Glasgow, Renfrewshire to Liverpool. She was refloated and taken in to Lytham St. Annes, Lancashire.
Sovereign	United Kingdom	The ship sank at Fraserburgh, Aberdeenshire. She was refloated on 14 January 1848.

== 30 December ==
List of shipwrecks: 30 December 1847
Ship	State	Description
Cowan	United Kingdom	The ship ran aground at North Shields, County Durham. She was on a voyage from North Shields to London. She was refloated and put back to North Shields.
Ocean	United Kingdom	The ship ran aground at Cardigan. She was on a voyage from Newport, Monmouthshire to Liverpool, Lancashire.
Northumberland	United Kingdom	The ship ran aground at North Shields. She was on a voyage from North Shields to London. She was refloated and put back to North Shields.

== 31 December ==
List of shipwrecks: 31 December 1847
Ship	State	Description
Bamborough Castle	United Kingdom	The ship was driven ashore at Corton, Suffolk. She was refloated and resumed her voyage.
Margaret	United Kingdom	The ship was wrecked on the Longsand, in the North Sea off the coast of Essex. She was on a voyage from Danzig to Weymouth, Dorset.
Nuevo	Spain	The ship ran aground off the Bahamas. She was on a voyage from Málaga to Havana, Cuba. She was refloated and taken in to Nassau, Bahamas.
Young Charles	Netherlands	The ship foundered in the North Sea 40 nautical miles (74 km) off Scarborough, Yorkshire, United Kingdom. Her crew were rescued.

== Unknown date ==
List of shipwrecks: Unknown date in December 1847
Ship	State	Description
Ann	United Kingdom	The sloop was driven ashore in the Kyles of Bute. She was on a voyage from Loch Fine to the Clyde. She was refloated with assistance from HMRC Princess Royal ( Board of Customs).
Ann Falcon	United Kingdom	The ship was driven ashore on Islay, Inner Hebrides before 27 December.
Bell	United Kingdom	The ship was driven ashore at Punta Mala, Spain. She was on a voyage from Galaţi, Ottoman Empire to Cork. She was refloated and put in to Gibraltar for repairs.
Black Wattle	(United Kingdom of Great Britain and Ireland) Van Diemen's Land	The schooner was wrecked in the Derwent River.
Brothers	United Kingdom	The ship was wrecked on the Gunfleet Sand, in the North Sea off the coast of Essex. Her crew were rescued.
Burnhopeside	United Kingdom	The barque capsized in the North Sea before 25 December. She was on a voyage from Saint Andrews, New Brunswick, British North America to London.
Concord	United States	The ship foundered in the Atlantic Ocean (28°20′N 55°16′W) before 27 December with the loss of a crew member. Survivors were rescued by Adrian (United States). Concord was on a voyage from Liverpool to Boston, Massachusetts.
Cumberland	United Kingdom	The barque was abandoned in the Atlantic Ocean off the Isles of Scilly before 9 December. She was subsequently towed in to the Isles of Scilly.
Dolphin	United Kingdom	The schooner was presumed to have foundered with the loss of all hands whilst on a voyage from Lisbon, Portugal to Plymouth, Devon.
Durham	United Kingdom	The brig was wrecked on the Goodwin Sands, Kent. Her crew were rescued.
Eagle	United Kingdom	The ship was driven ashore at Port Talbot, Glamorgan before 4 December. She was refloated on 9 December.
Echo	United Kingdom	The ship foundered before 4 December. She was on a voyage from Renfrew to Barcelona, Spain.
Eliza	United Kingdom	The ship was driven ashore at Kilrush, County Clare. She was refloated on 22 December.
Era	United Kingdom	The ship was driven ashore on Formentera, Spain before 19 December. She was on a voyage from Liverpool to Livorno, Grand Duchy of Tuscany.
Evangelistra	Ottoman Empire	The ship was wrecked in the Black Sea before 15 December.
Fairy	Prussia	The ship ran aground on the Rive Shoals. She was on a voyage from Memel to Barcelona, Spain. She was refloated and taken in to Otterswick, Shetland Islands, United Kingdom.
First	United Kingdom	The schooner was presumed to have foundered with the loss of all hands whilst on a voyage from Jersey, Channel Islands to Swansea, Glamorgan.
Flora	United Kingdom	The schooner was presumed to have foundered with the loss of all hands whilst on a voyage from Liverpool to Jersey.
Gratitude	United Kingdom	The ship was wrecked at Windau, Prussia. Her crew survived.
Hopewell	(United Kingdom of Great Britain and Ireland) Jersey	The schooner was presumed to have foundered with the loss of all hands whilst on a voyage from Liverpool to Jersey.
Java Packet	United Kingdom	The ship was lost in the Bangka Strait before 28 December.
Jeune Nathalie	France	The ship was lost off Port-Louis, Morbihan before 6 December. She was on a voyage from Constantinople, Ottoman Empire to Dunkirk, Nord.
J. H. Adame	United Kingdom	The ship was driven ashore on the Irish coast. She was on a voyage from Liverpool to Havana, Cuba. She was refloated and put back to Liverpool, where she arrived on 16 December.
John	United Kingdom	The smack was wrecked at Padstow, Cornwall.
John D. Jones	United States	The ship was in collision with Lancashire (United Kingdom) and was abandoned in the Atlantic Ocean.
Louise Caroline	(Russian Empire) Grand Duchy of Finland	The ship was wrecked near Mandahl, Norway before 15 December. She was on a voyage from Hull, Yorkshire, United Kingdom to Porvoo.
Margaret Pollock	United Kingdom	The ship was driven ashore in the Saint Lawrence River. She was on a voyage from Quebec City Province of Canada, British North America to London. She was refloated in a waterlogged condition and taken in to La Hay Bay.
Marie Denise	France	The ship was driven ashore at "Monachi". She was on a voyage from Agrigento, Sicily to Marseille, Bouches-du-Rhône.
Martha Jane	United Kingdom	The ship was wrecked near Medea, Ottoman Empire with the loss of all hands.
Mary Francis	United States	The ship was in collision with Washington (United States) and was abandoned. She was on a voyage from Boston, Massachusetts to New Orleans, Louisiana.
Mary Jane	(United Kingdom of Great Britain and Ireland) British North America	The ship was abandoned in the Atlantic Ocean before 14 December. Her crew were rescued by Ocean Queen (United Kingdom). She came ashore at Skibbereen, County Cork by 22 December and was wrecked.
Mary Jane	United Kingdom	The ship was wrecked on Gun Point Cape Clear Island, County Cork before 20 December.
Mould	United Kingdom	The brig was driven ashore south of Sunderland, County Durham. She was refloated on 7 December and taken in to Sunderland.
Mutine Bay	United Kingdom	The ship ran aground on the Square Point Reef before 11 December.
Noysomheden	Denmark	The ship was driven ashore near "Hittorp". She was refloated on 13 December and towed in to Helsingør by the steamship Hertha (Denmark).
Ocean Queen	United Kingdom	The ship was lost in the Irish Sea before 18 December.
Oberon	Royal Navy	The Antelope-class sloop was damaged by fire before 18 December.
Paraguay	Norway	The ship was driven ashore near Lister, Norway after 28 December and subsequently sank. She was on a voyage from St. Jago de Cuba, Cuba to a Norwegian port.
Pilgrim	United Kingdom	The ship was driven ashore at Ramsgate, Kent. She was on a voyage from Saint John, New Brunswick, British North America to London. She was refloated and taken in tow for London.
Renaissance	France	The ship foundered in the Bay of Biscay off Tarnos, Landes between 4 and 11 December. She was on a voyage from Bayonne, Basses-Pyrénées to Cette, Hérault.
Rose	United Kingdom	The ship was driven ashore on Scattery Island, County Clare. She was on a voyage from Limerick to London. She was refloated on 20 December and put back to Limerick.
Sam Baker	United Kingdom	The sloop foundered in the English Channel off the coast of Finistère, France.
Sterling	United Kingdom	The barque was lost in the Mindoro Strait. She was on a voyage from Sydney, New South Wales to Hong Kong.
Surpass	United Kingdom	The ship was driven ashore on Tresco, Isles of Scilly between 4 and 7 December. She was on a voyage from Liverpool to Syra and Salonica, Greece. She was refloated.
Susan and Jane	(United Kingdom of Great Britain and Ireland) Jersey	The cutter was lost whilst on a voyage from Teignmouth, Devon to Jersey. Her crew were rescued.
