= Knockananna =

Village in County Wicklow, Ireland

Knockananna Irish: Cnoc an Eanaigh
- Village
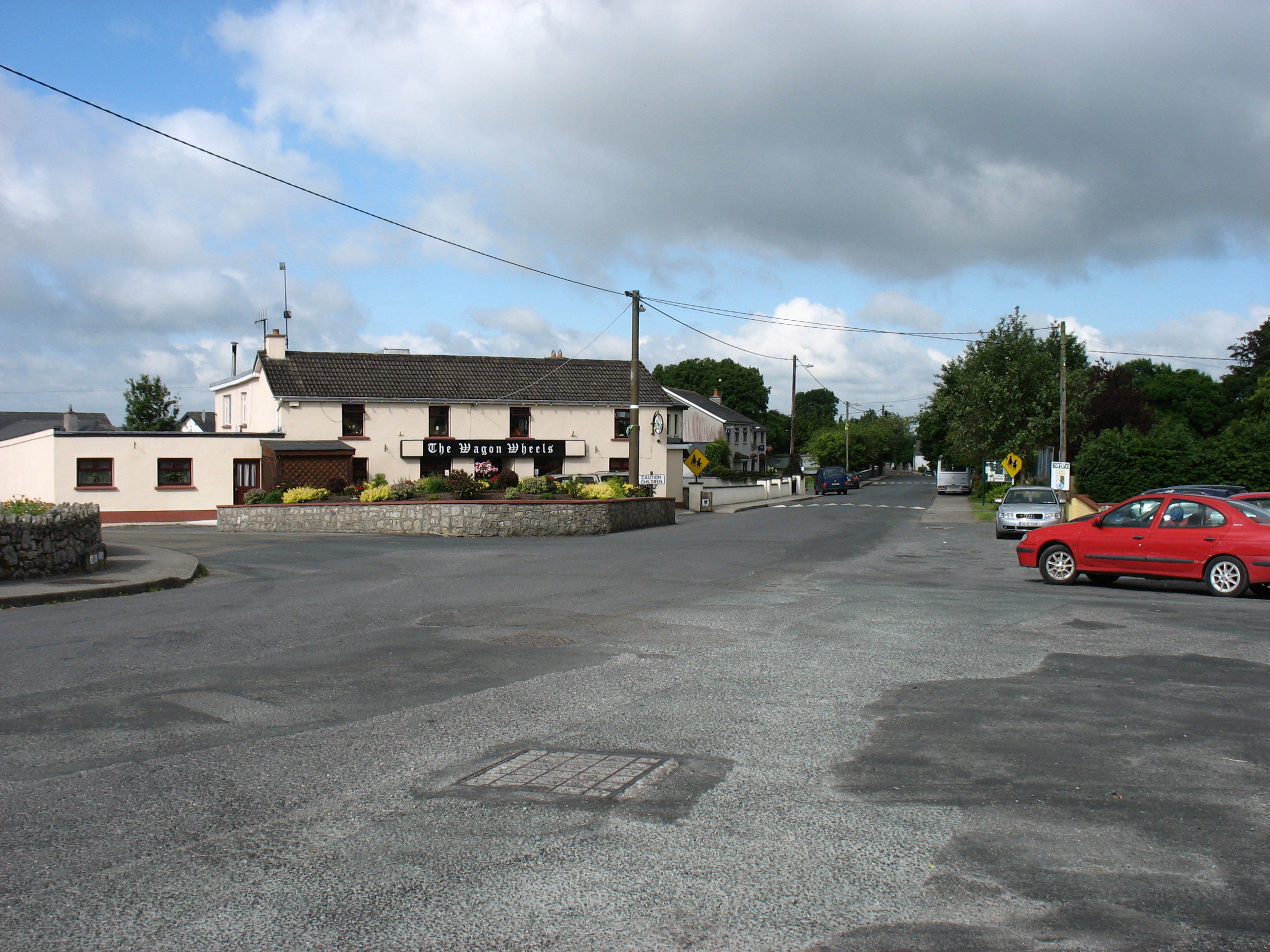
- Centre of Knockananna

- Location in Ireland
- Coordinates: 52°52′26″N 6°29′35″W
- Country: Ireland
- Province: Leinster
- County: County Wicklow
- Elevation: 205 m (673 ft)

Population (2016)
  - Total: 143
- Irish Grid Reference: T010814

Knockananna (Irish: Cnoc an Eanaigh, meaning 'hill of the marsh') is a village in County Wicklow, Ireland. After Roundwood, it is the second-highest village in Ireland.

== Toponymy ==
In Liam Price's extensive survey of place names of County Wicklow his earliest record of Knockananna is dated 1714 using the current spelling. A 1715 record uses Knockannana. The Straughan family deeds use a different spelling; Knockinana in 1717. Finally the village name shown in A.R. Neville's Map of County Wicklow from circa 1810 is Knockanana. A grave accent has been added in the 1989 Gazetteer of Ireland making Knockànanna to provide a guide to proper stressing in pronouncing the name correctly. Price mentions two local names: Boorawn being derived from baudrán a basket covered in cow-hide and Kish, from ceis the name of part of the bog.

== Geography ==
Knockananna lies close to the border between County Wicklow and County Carlow. The village is the centre of a dispersed farming area, 2 km to the north-west of Moyne and the Wicklow Way.

== People ==
During the late 18th century and early 19th century a priest by the name of Fr. John Blanchfield (Blanchvelle) was active in Knockananna and Hacketstown. He was interred in the old church in Knockananna. The old church was renamed the Blanchelle Centre in his honour. The village is served by the Church of the Immaculate Conception which was built in 1978.

Colonel Commandant Tom Kehoe (Free State Forces) was born in the area in 1899. He was a member of Michael Collins's assassination Squad, which killed a number of British agents on 21 November 1920. Kehoe himself died from severe wounds he received while attempting to remove a booby trapped land mine during the civil war in Macroom in September 1922.

Irish singer and songwriter Órla Fallon was born in Knockananna in 1974.

In early 2020 at the start of the COVID-19 pandemic until 2022 after her son Shane had committed suicide, the singer Sinéad O'Connor lived in Knockananna.

== Services ==
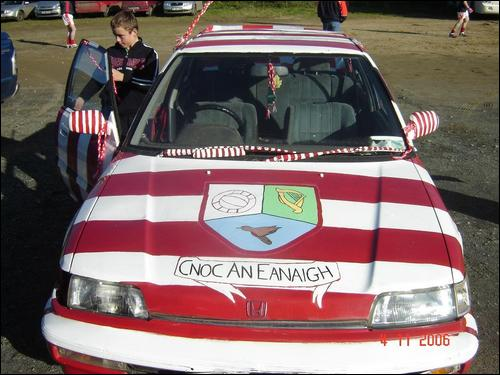
Decorated car of a GAA fan at the annual Knockananna festival

There is a grocery shop and a pub in the village. The village has a GAA team and the club colours are red and white.

The village was served by a post office from at least 1927, under Ballinglen until its closure on 5 March 2010. The Knockananna post office came under the auspices of Arklow from 1964 until it was closed.
