= Martin Savage (Irish republican) =

Irish Republican Army member

Martin Savage Irish: Máirtín Sabhaois
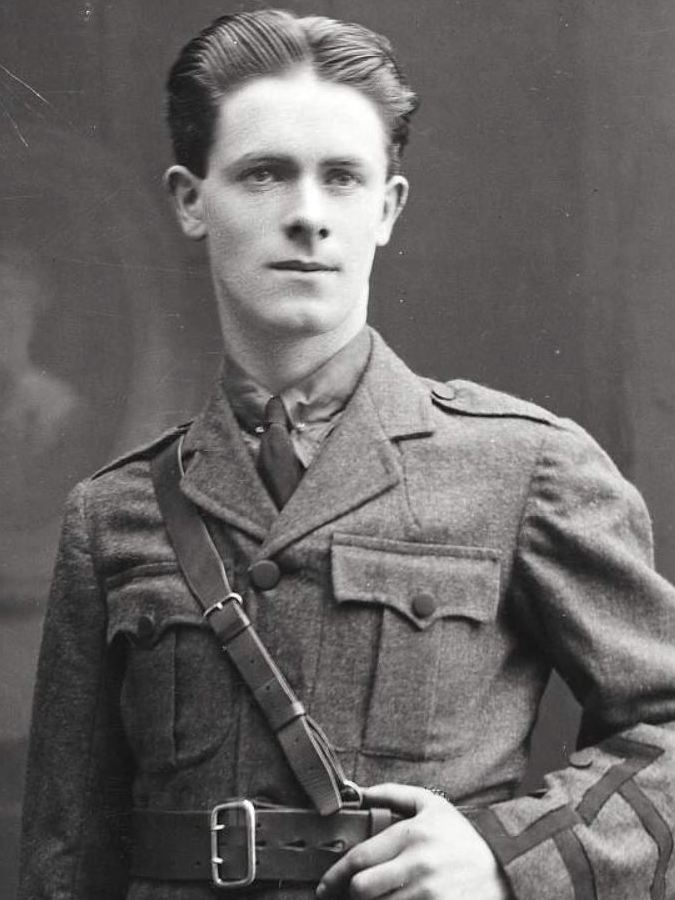
- Born: 12 October 1897; Ballisodare, County Sligo, Ireland
- Died: 19 December 1919 (aged 22); Ashtown, County Dublin, Ireland
- Military career
- Allegiance: Irish Republican Army, Irish Volunteers
- Service years: 1916–1919
- Rank: Officer
- Unit: Dublin Brigade
- Conflicts: Easter Rising, Irish War of Independence

Martin Savage (Irish: Máirtín Sabhaois; 12 October 1897 – 19 December 1919) was an Officer in the Dublin Brigade of the Irish Republican Army, from Ballisodare, County Sligo. On 19 December 1919 he was killed in a gun battle during an ambush at Ashtown, then on the outskirts of Dublin city, during the early stages of the Irish War of Independence.

== Early life ==
Savage was born in Streamstown, Ballisodare, County Sligo on 12 October 1897. He was the youngest son of Michael Savage who was known locally as a Fenian activist and Bridget Savage, formerly Gildea. After leaving school he worked as an apprentice grocer in Sligo Town before committing himself to the fight for Irish Independence.

== Military action ==
Savage moved to Dublin in 1915 and got work at Keogh's of Bachelor's Walk, and joined the Irish Volunteers. As an 18-year-old he took part in the 1916 Easter Rising in Dublin and fought at the Four Courts. He was captured by the British Army and imprisoned in Richmond Barracks. On 30 April 1916 he was deported to Knutsford Detention Barracks in Cheshire, England along with 200 other captured prisoners. Upon his release Savage returned to Dublin and re-engaged in paramilitary activity and became a Lieutenant in the 2nd Battalion of the Dublin Brigade. Within republican circles he was known as a shy, slim built, handsome Sligonian who was a popular and trusted especially amongst the likes of Dan Breen, Seán Treacy and Seán Hogan.

== The Ashtown ambush ==
=== Planning by Breen ===
On 19 December 1919, Savage and 10 fellow Volunteers including Mick McDonnell, Tom Kehoe, Seán Treacy, Séumas Robinson, Seán Hogan, Paddy Daly (Leader), Vincent Byrne, Tom Kilcoyne, Joe Leonard and Dan Breen, met after planning to assassinate the British Viceroy, Lord Lieutenant of Ireland and Supreme Commander of the British Army in Ireland, Lord French, as he returned from a private party which he had hosted the previous evening at his country residence in Frenchpark, County Roscommon.

It was not originally planned that Savage was to take an active part in the ambush, however, after a chance meeting with Breen and Hogan, Savage insisted that he join the ambushing force. Sean Hogan initially attempted to dissuade him, but relented and gave Savage an automatic pistol. The unit's intelligence operative had informed it that Lord French would be travelling in the second car of the armed convoy that comprised an outrider and three following cars, which would bring Lord French from Ashtown railway station to the Vice-Regal Lodge in Phoenix Park, Dublin.

=== Events of the day ===
On the day of the ambush, Savage attended work as usual and slipped away early in the morning to meet with the other men who were to take part in the attack who were gathered at Fleming's Pub in Drumcondra. They departed Drumcondra in small groups to avoid raising suspicion as they cycled through Phibsboro and up the Cabra Road, and then regrouped at Kelly's Public House (now called the Halfway House) in Ashtown. At approximately 11:40 a.m., as the train carrying Lord French pulled into the station, they left the pub and took up positions along the crossroads at Ashtown.

The plan was for Martin Savage, Tom Kehoe and Dan Breen to push a hay-cart halfway across the road and then, after the out-rider and the first car had passed, they would push it the rest of the way across the road, thereby completely blocking the path of the remaining vehicles. They had been informed that Lord French was to be in the second car and this car they intended to attack with Mills Bombs and rifle fire.

As they pushed the hay-cart across the road their plan was almost foiled as a member of the Royal Irish Constabulary (RIC) disturbed them, telling them to move on. One of them threw a grenade at him, although it didn't explode it struck the police officer on the head, knocking him unconscious. The police officer was then dragged from the road and the attack went ahead as planned.

=== Lord French's car and the gun battle ===
When the convoy appeared minutes later the attack commenced, forcing the target second car in the convoy to swerve off the road. However, unknown to the attackers Lord French was travelling in the first car, which managed to drive through the blockade. The occupants of the second car, part of Lord French's guard, returned fire. As the gun battle developed the third car of the convoy arrived on the other side of the cart, and its occupants began firing with rifles on the now exposed ambushing force. In the exchange of fire Breen was shot in the leg, and seconds later Savage fell mortally wounded after being hit by a bullet in the neck. He died in the arms of Breen and his last words to Breen were "I'm done, but carry on....". Tom Kehoe and the wounded Breen succeeded in carrying Savage's body from the road and back to Kelly's Pub while the gun battle continued. Two Royal Irish Constabulary police officers and a driver were also wounded in the gun battle. At this point the British military, including some wounded, began to withdraw from the scene and continued on towards the Phoenix Park. Knowing British reinforcements would be on their way, the IRA unit itself dispersed to safe houses in the Dublin area. Breen was helped onto his bike by Paddy Daly who helped him to a safehouse in the Phibsboro' area, where he was medically treated to by the captain of the Dublin hurling team, Dr J.M. Ryan.

The next morning, the Irish Independent published an article which described the attackers as "assassins" and included other such terms as "criminal folly", "outrage" and "murder." Taking these terms as an insult to their dead comrade, it was decided to attack the newspaper's offices. On Sunday, at 9pm, between twenty and thirty IRA men under the direction of Peadar Clancy entered the offices of the Independent where they proceeded to wreck its machinery of production. Despite this, with the assistance of the other Dublin newspapers, the Independent was able to appear the next day, and the owners were awarded £16,000 in compensation. According to Breen in his memoir, neither the Independent, nor any other Dublin newspaper, ever dared refer to the IRA as 'murderers or assassins' again.

== Funeral ==
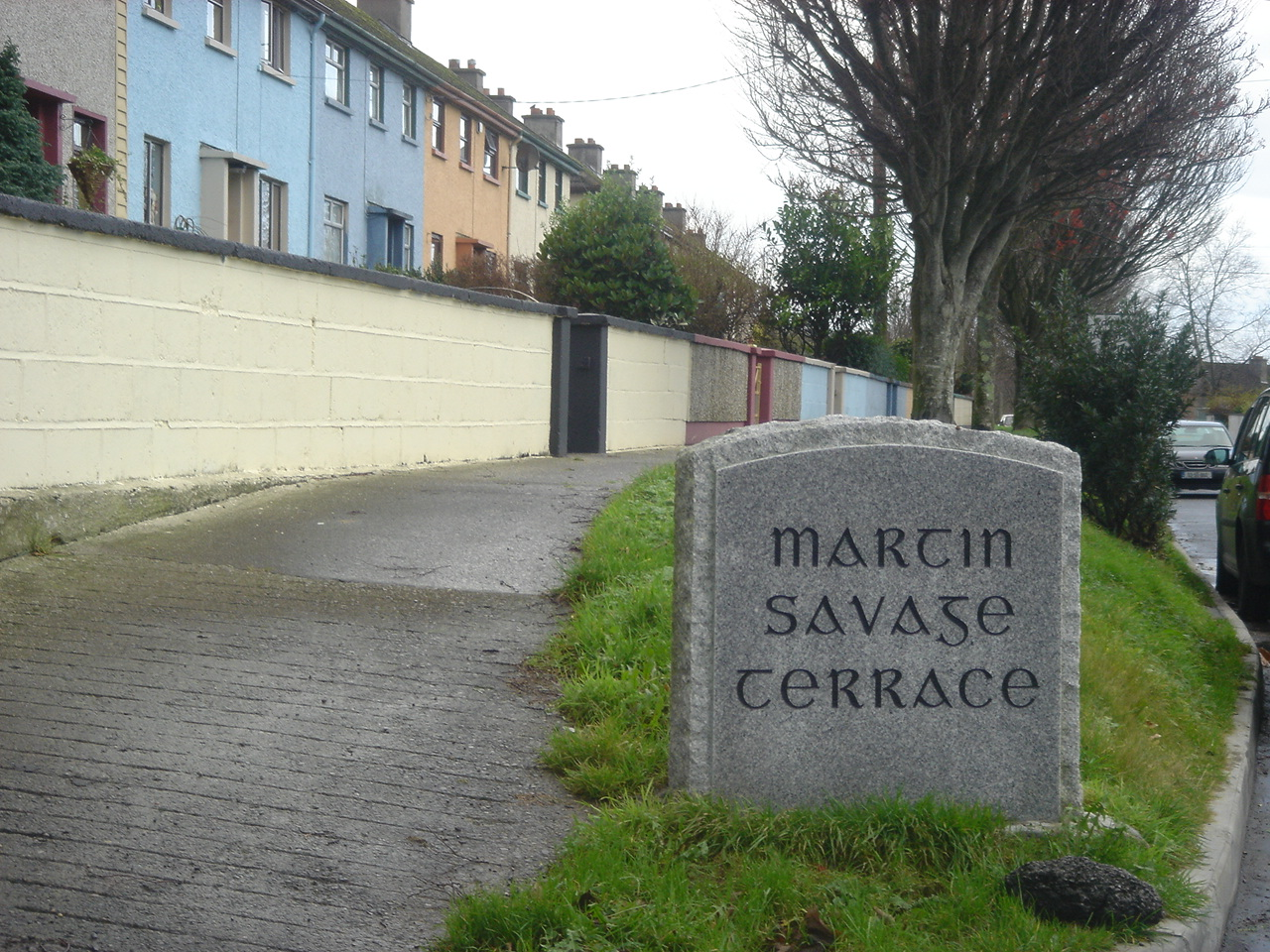
Street plaque at Martin Savage Terrace, Sligo.

Savage's body was taken by British military and an inquest was held into his death. The inquest was attended by his brother and his employer, the Presbyterian William Kirk, in whose provision merchant's at 137 North Strand Road, Savage had been sub-manager. Kirk described Savage as "a steady, sober and industrious young man, gentlemanly in manner and extremely courteous."

After the inquest, Savage's body was handed over to his relatives. His remains lay overnight at Broadstone Station before departing for Sligo where it was met at Collooney railway station by a large crowd. His coffin, draped in an Irish Tricolour, was carried over two miles at shoulder height to his family's burial ground. It was buried with military honours in his native Ballisodare, County Sligo.

Breen noted that "the cortege was several miles long, the Parish Priest attended and recited the last prayer, while the Royal Irish Constabulary, armed with guns, surrounded the graveyard. "However, I suppose, this was the best tribute they could have paid to a gallant soldier, even though they did not mean it that way".

== Legacy ==
Poster for Volunteer Martin Savage Commemoration

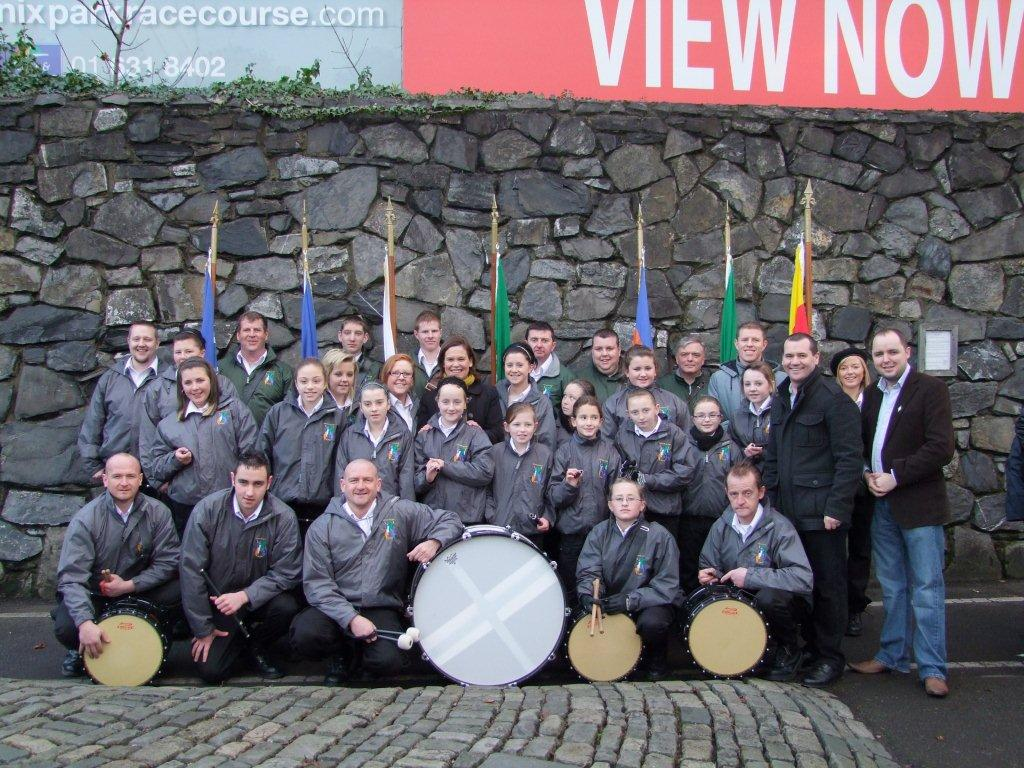
The Carrick-on-Suir Republican Flute Band pictured at the Volunteer Martin Savage Commemoration, Saturday 12 December 2009

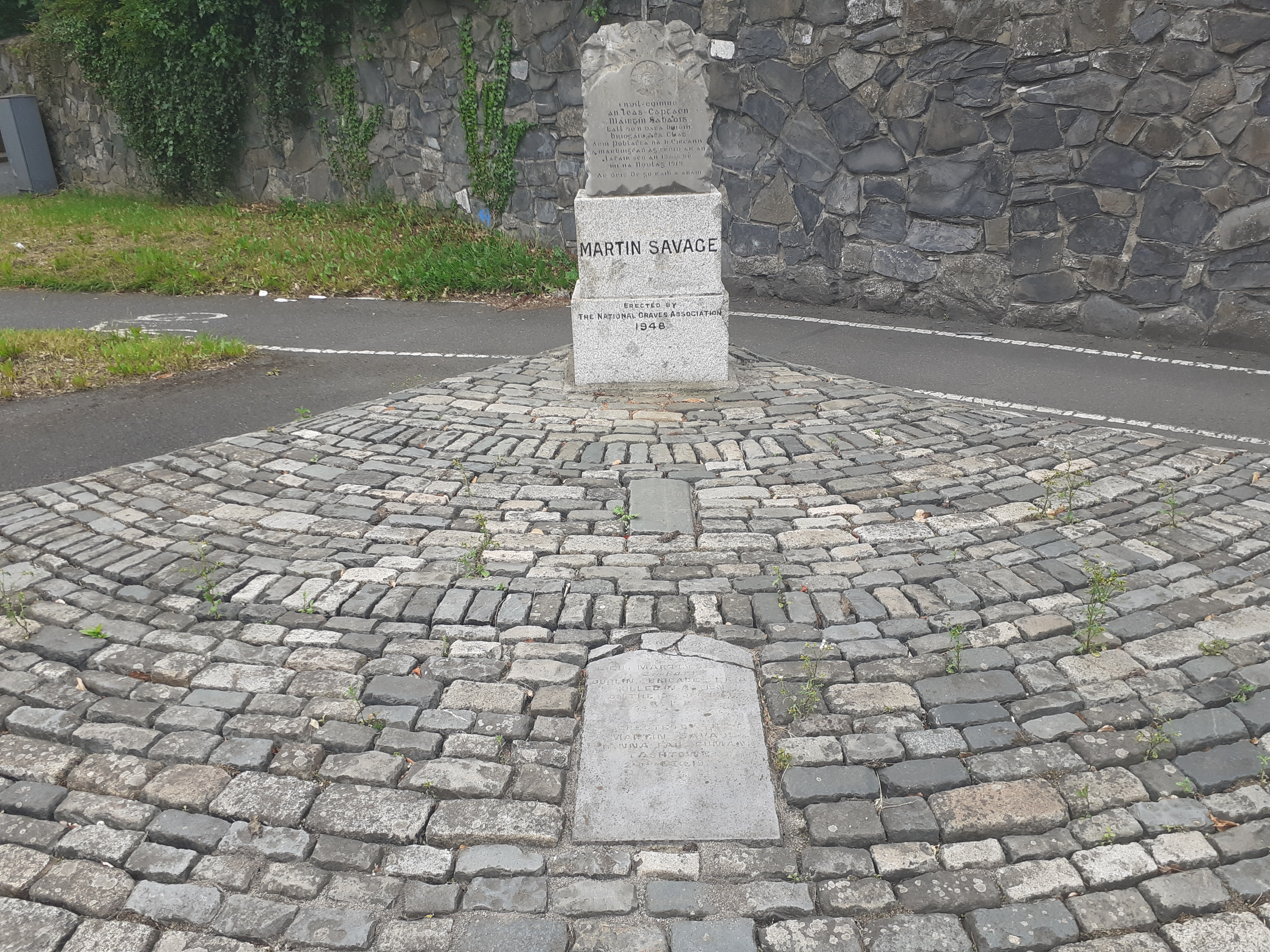
Martin Savage memorial at Ashtown

In 1948, the National Graves Association erected a memorial to Savage close to the site of the ambush at Ashtown Roundabout. There is an annual commemoration of his death at the site of the ambush.

There have also been a number of streets and public places named after him including Martin Savage Place in County Meath, Martin Savage Road and the home of St. Oliver Plunkett's Eoghan Ruadh GAA club, Martin Savage Park in County Dublin and Martin Savage Terrace near the centre of Sligo Town.

The Ashtown Fianna Fáil Cumann, named after Savage, hold an annual commemoration on the Sunday after the anniversary of his death at the Ashtown memorial site. Since 2002, the Sinn Féin Joe McDonnell Cumann hold an annual rally on the anniversary of his death also.

The Coen/Savage (East Sligo) Sinn Féin Cumann also hold a wreath laying ceremony every Easter Sunday morning at Martin Savage's graveside in Ballisodare, County Sligo.
