= Tom Kehoe =

Irish revolutionary

Colonel-Commandant Thomas Kehoe
- Born: November 19, 1899; Rathnagrew, County Carlow
- Died: September 16, 1922 (aged 22); Mercy University Hospital, Cork
- Cause of death: wounds received from the explosion of a mine
- Resting place: Knockananna Cemetery, Knockananna, County Wicklow

Thomas Kehoe (19 November 1899 – 16 September 1922) was an Irish revolutionary, soldier and member of Michael Collins's "Squad".

== Early life ==
Kehoe was born on 19th November 1899 in Rathnagrew, County Carlow, near Knockananna, County Wicklow. The family home straddled the border of the townlands of Rathnagrew Upper, County Carlow and Rathduffmore, County Wicklow. His parents were Simon and Julia Kehoe. Kehoe attended Rathmeigue National School.

Kehoe left Rathnagrew/Rathduffmore at the age of 14, moving to Dublin to work as an apprentice fitter on the Great Northern Railway, staying with his eldest half-brother, Mick McDonnell, ten years older than him.

== 1916 Easter Rising ==
Under the influence of his half-brother Mick McDonnell, 'Long Tom' Kehoe joined the Irish Volunteers in 1915. He became a member of the E Company, 2nd Battalion, Dublin Brigade. Kehoe (aged just 16) and McDonnell were stationed at Jacob’s Factory during the 1916 Easter Rising.

After the rebellion Kehoe was held with others at Richmond Barracks until 26th May 1916, when the British military announced a list of 206 prisoners, including Kehoe, to be released.

== The Squad ==
Kehoe was recruited by Michael Collins to The Squad in September 1919. On Bloody Sunday, Kehoe was part of the team that assassinated Lieutenant McMahon at 22 Lower Mount Street.

== Death ==
On 16th September 1922, a National Army convoy of the Dublin Guard led by Kehoe, encountered a mine in the centre of the road at the bridge at Carrigaphooca, while travelling from Macroom to Killarney. While they attempted to dismantle it, a second mine detonated, severely wounding Kehoe and killing six other soldiers, Captain Dan O’Brien, Sgt William Murphy, Volunteers Thomas Manning, John O’Riordan, Patrick O’Rourke and Ralph Conway.

Kehoe was transported to Mercy Hospital, Cork, where he died some hours later. Mary Collins Powell, sister of Michael Collins, tended to him there. She wrote to his mother:

I was present when Tom died, he died like a tired child going to sleep, he just closed his eyes and his mouth, and all was over... God loved him and I am sure after his brave fights, took him to join the Big Fellow.

Kehoe's body was transported from Cork to Dublin abord the Helga, and he was later buried in Knockananna Cemetery.

In reprisal for Kehoe's death, a Republican who was in custody, James Buckley, was taken out and killed by the Dublin Guard in Macroom, and his beaten and bullet-riddled body left in the crater where Kehoe and his comrades had been blown up.

== Legacy ==
Kehoe and his comrades killed at Carrigaphooca are memorialised by a cross and plaque at Carrigaphooca bridge, near the site of the explosion. A monument at Knockananna was unveiled in the presence of the surviving members of the Squad in 1924. Two other monuments commemorate the time in Carrigaphooca, one to Tom Kehoe and his comrades and the other to James Buckley, the prisoner killed in reprisal for his death.

Fabric, service stripes and buttons from Kehoe's uniform, kept by Vinny Byrne and displayed in his home until after his death, are now in the Michael Collins Centre Museum, Ballinoroher, Clonakilty, County Cork.
