= Francis Baker (cricketer) =

English cricketer

Personal information
- Full name: Francis Baker
- Born: 5 December 1847; Cirencester, Gloucestershire
- Died: 15 April 1901 (aged 53)
- Batting: Left-handed
- Bowling: Right-arm medium

Domestic team information
- Years: Team
- 1868–1875: MCC
- 1875: Gloucestershire

Career statistics
Competition	First-class
Matches	8
Runs scored	199
Batting average	15.30
100s/50s	0/1
Top score	53
Catches/stumpings	4/–
- Source: ESPNcricinfo, 11 June 2014

Francis Baker (5 December 1847 – 15 April 1901) was an English cricketer. A left-handed batsman born in Cirencester, Gloucestershire, Baker's career in first-class cricket spanned eight matches for the Marylebone Cricket Club, Gloucestershire County Cricket Club, and two Gentlemen's teams between 1866 and 1875. He scored 199 runs in these matches, with a batting average of 15.30. His best innings, a score of 53, came against Surrey on 4 June 1868, while playing for the MCC. In other cricket, he played over two-dozen matches for Cheltenham College – his alma mater – and the Free Foresters Cricket Club.
