= Charles Alexander (cricketer, born 1847) =

English barrister, stockbroker and cricketer

Personal information
- Full name: Charles Robert Alexander
- Born: 8 November 1847; Westminster, London
- Died: 17 February 1902 (aged 54); Westminster, London
- Batting: Right-handed

Domestic team information
- Years: Team
- 1867–1869: Kent
- 1870–1871: Cambridge University

Career statistics
Competition	First-class
Matches	6
Runs scored	88
Batting average	9.77
100s/50s	0/0
Top score	41
Catches/stumpings	2/–
- Source: ESPNcricinfo, 27 January 2011

Charles Robert Alexander (8 November 1847 – 17 February 1902) was an English barrister, stockbroker and amateur cricketer.

== Early life ==
Alexander was the son of James and Anna Alexander and was born at Westminster in London in 1847. His father was a banker and East India Agent and Alexander grew up at the family home Oak Bank at Seal near Sevenoaks, Kent.

After attending Eton College, where he captained the school cricket XI in his final year, Alexander went up to King's College, Cambridge in 1867. He studied Law and was admitted to the Middle Temple in 1868 before graduating in 1871.

== Cricket ==
A right-handed batsman, Alexander made his first-class cricket debut for Kent County Cricket Club against the Gentlemen of Marylebone Cricket Club (MCC) in 1867, the summer after he left school. Alexander appeared three further times for Kent, playing his final first-class match for the county in 1869 against Sussex. At Cambridge he played for the University Cricket Club against Surrey at The Oval in 1870 and against MCC in 1871. Whilst at University he played cricket regularly, including for amateur teams such as Perambulators, Quidnuncs and Harlequins as well as for MCC.

== Professional and later life ==
Alexander moved from the Middle Temple to Lincoln's Inn in 1873 before he was called to the bar in 1874. He later became a member of the London Stock Exchange.

Alexander married Mary Evans; the couple had no children. He died in February 1902 at Westminster aged 54 leaving an estate worth over £17,000.

== Bibliography ==
- Carlaw, Derek (2020). Kent County Cricketers, A to Z: Part One (1806–1914) (PDF). Cardiff: ACS.
