= William Bosomworth =

English cricketer

William Edward Bosomworth (8 March 1847 – 7 June 1891) was an English first-class cricketer, who appeared four times for Yorkshire County Cricket Club between 1872 and 1880. A right-handed batsman and right arm fast round arm bowler, he took nine wickets at an average of 15.55, with a best of 2 for 5, and scored 20 runs at 3.33, with a top score of 7.

Bosomworth was born in Carlton-Husthwaite, Thirsk, and made his Yorkshire debut on 17 June 1872, against Surrey at Bramall Lane, Sheffield, then played twice against Middlesex at North Marine Road, Scarborough in 1874, and at Prince's Road Ground in Chelsea, in 1875. His final game was in the 1880 Roses Match at Old Trafford in August 1880.

A tall, gangling man, he took 8-24 for XVIII of Elland against the Australians in 1878 to give Elland a narrow victory, and also assisted Yorkshire United during the 1870s. He once took 3-3 and 4-6 for Melton C.C., when Easingwold C.C. were dismissed for 11 and 17, as the home side won by an innings and 60 runs.

He died in Malton, North Yorkshire in June 1891, at the age of 44.
