= HMS Avenger (1845) =

Frigate of the Royal Navy

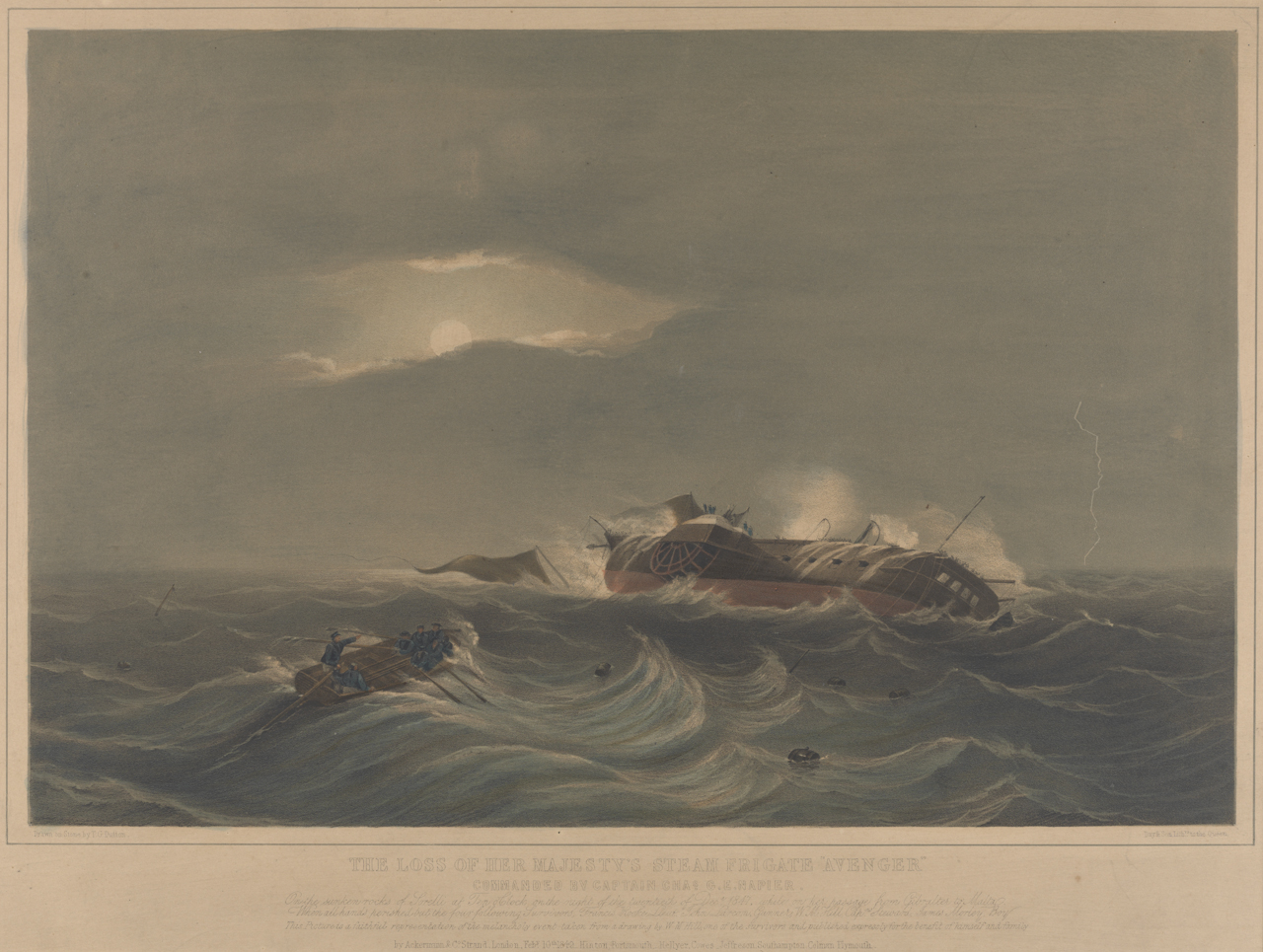
- The loss of HM Steam Frigate Avenger

History

United Kingdom
- Name: HMS Avenger
- Ordered: 19 February 1844
- Builder: Devonport Dockyard
- Laid down: 27 August 1844
- Launched: 5 August 1845
- Commissioned: 21 June 1846
- Fate: Wrecked on the Sorelle Rocks, Tunisia on 20 December 1847

General characteristics
- Class & type: Frigate
- Tons burthen: 1444 bm
- Length: 236 ft 9 in (72.16 m) o/a; 210 ft (64 m) p.p.; 183 ft 3 in (55.85 m) keel
- Beam: 39 ft (12 m)
- Installed power: 650 ihp (480 kW)
- Propulsion: 2-cylinder direct-acting steam engines; paddle wheels
- Speed: 9.5 kn (10.9 mph; 17.6 km/h)
- Complement: 200 (later 250)
- Armament: 2 × 8 in (200 mm) (112cwt) pivot guns, 4 × 8 in (200 mm) (65cwt) pivot guns, 4 × 32 pdr (15 kg) (25cwt) gunnades

HMS Avenger was a wooden paddle wheel frigate of the Royal Navy launched in 1845 and wrecked with heavy loss of life in 1847.

== Construction and commissioning ==
Avenger was built to a design by Sir William Symonds that was approved on 25 March 1844. She was initially ordered from Deptford Dockyard on 19 February 1844 but the order was transferred to Devonport Dockyard on 22 June 1844. She was laid down there on 27 August 1844 and launched on 5 August 1845. She sailed under a jury rig to Deptford where her machinery was fitted and completed. She was then commissioned on 21 June 1846. She had cost £44,777 for the hull, £32,740 for machinery, and £11,630 for the fittings. She was armed with 10 guns and was initially rated as a first-class frigate, though this was later reduced on 31 July 1846 to a second-class.

=== Armament ===
The armament of the Avenger was planned to consist of 2 68 pdr (8 inch 112 cwt), 4 56 56 pdr (8 inch 45 cwt) and 4 32 pdr 25cwt. The main deck was constructed to mount 16 32 pdrs, but it was noted that 10 more heavy guns could be mounted if some cabins were removed. In 1846 the Avenger was mentioned in the Channel fleet with 10 guns. A year later she mounted on the upper deck: 2 68 pdr 95cwt on sleds; 2 10 inch 85 cwt on sleds, 2 32 pdr 65cwt, while nothing was said about guns on the main deck. In a list of the British naval force in Portugal in late 1847, the Avenger is indeed mentioned with only 6 guns. Apparently, the Avenger had no guns on her main deck by 1847.

== Service ==
Avenger served with the Channel Fleet from 28 April 1846 to November 1847, when she was transferred to the Mediterranean.

== Loss ==
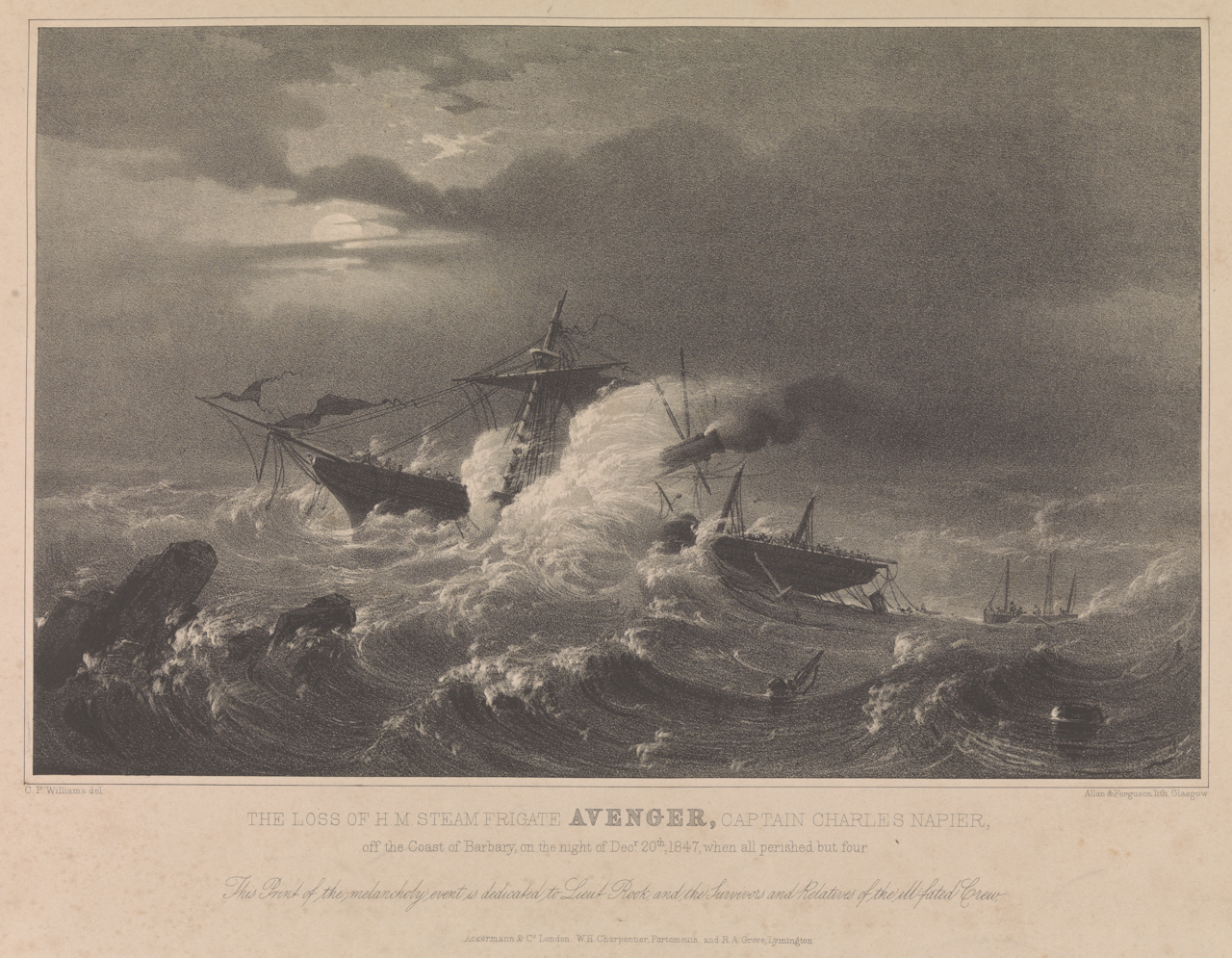
The ship in distress

Avenger sailed from Gibraltar on 17 December 1847 bound for Malta and commanded by Captain Charles Elers Napier, stepson of Rear Admiral Sir Charles Napier who was then commanding the Channel Fleet. On 20 December she ran onto the Sorelle Rocks, near Tunisia. Captain Napier drowned, and only eight crew members survived.

== See also ==
- List of frigate classes of the Royal Navy
