= Moyne, County Wicklow =

Civil parish in county Wicklow

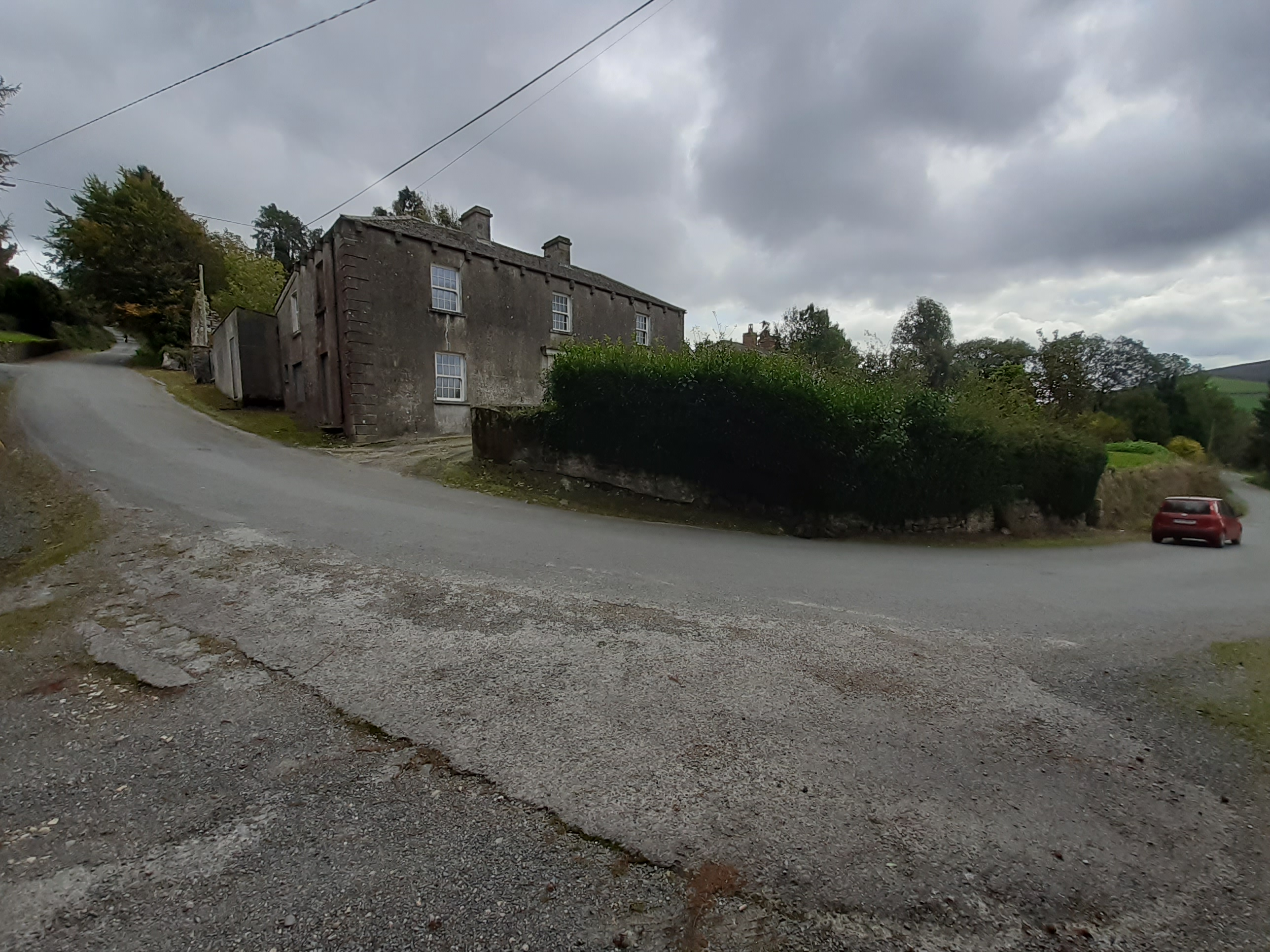
The hamlet of Moyne in 2023

Moyne (Irish: An Mhaighean, meaning 'small plain') is a civil parish in the barony of Ballinacor South in County Wicklow, Ireland.

Moyne is also a hamlet of Georgian period influence and is one of the stops along the Wicklow Way. As of the 1830s, there were two schools in Moyne: a private school with about 40 pupils, and a larger one.
