= Sorelle Rocks =

Tunisian geological marine feature

The Sorelle Rocks (also called the Sorelle Reef and the Sorelli Rocks) are two submerged rocks approximately 20 miles (32 km) west of the Galite Islands of Tunisia, at approximately 37°24′N 8°36′E.

In form they are two submerged plateaux extending from the north-west to the south-east about 169 feet (52 m) apart and separated by a channel of 39–49 feet (12–15 m) depth. The north-west rock is approximately 66 feet (20 m) in diameter, and 16 feet (4.9 m) under water, while the south-east rock is 197 feet (60 m) in diameter and lies only 4 feet (1.2 m) under water.

HMS Avenger ran aground on the Sorelle Rocks in 1847 with great loss of life.
