= Treason Act 1702 =

Act of the Parliament of England

Treason Act 1702 (Note: This act does not have a statutory short title, but is commonly known by this name; The Stationery Office, Chronological Table of the Statutes, 2007, p.76)
- Act of Parliament
- Parliament of England
- Long title: An Act for enlarging the Time for taking the Oath of Abjuration; and also for re-capacitating and indemnifying such Persons as have not taken the same by the Time limited, and shall take the same by a Time to be appointed; and for the further Security of Her Majesty's Person, and the Succession of the Crown in the Protestant Line; and for extinguishing the Hopes of the pretended Prince of Wales, and all other Pretenders, and their open and secret Abettors.
- Citation: 1 Ann. St. 2. c. 21 (Note: This is the citation in The Statutes of the Realm.); 1 Ann. St. 2. c. 17 (Note: This is the citation in The Statutes at Large.)
- Territorial extent: England and Wales; Scotland

Dates
- Royal assent: 27 February 1703
- Commencement: 1 March 1702 (Note: Section 3.)
Other legislation
Amended by	Statute Law Revision Act 1867; Promissory Oaths Act 1871; Statute Law Revision Act 1887; Statute Law Revision Act 1948; Crime and Disorder Act 1998
Relates to	Crown and Parliament Recognition Act 1689; Treason Act (Ireland) 1703; Succession to the Crown Act 1707

Status: Partially repealed

Text of statute as originally enacted

Revised text of statute as amended

Text of the Act 1 Anne Stat. 2 1702 as in force today (including any amendments) within the United Kingdom, from legislation.gov.uk.

Treason Act (Ireland) 1703
- Act of Parliament
- Parliament of Ireland
- Long title: An Act to make it High Treason in this Kingdom to impeach the Succession of the Crown, as limited by several Acts of Parliament.
- Citation: 2 Anne c. 5 (I)
- Territorial extent: Ireland

Dates
- Royal assent: 4 March 1704
- Commencement: 21 September 1703 (Note: Start of session.)
Other legislation
Amended by	Treason Act 1945; Short Titles Act (Northern Ireland) 1951; Statute Law Revision Act 1953; Crime and Disorder Act 1998
Relates to	Bill of Rights 1688; Act of Settlement

Status: Partially repealed

Status
- Republic of Ireland: Repealed
- Northern Ireland: Current legislation

Text of statute as originally enacted

Revised text of statute as amended

The Treason Act 1702 (1 Ann. St. 2. c. 21) is an act of the Parliament of England, passed to enforce the line of succession to the English throne (today the British throne), previously established by the Bill of Rights and the Act of Settlement 1701 (12 & 13 Will. 3. c. 2).

Section 3 of the act makes it treason to "endeavour to deprive or hinder any person who shall be the next in succession to the crown for the time being ... from succeeding after the decease of her Majesty (whom God long preserve) to the imperial crown of this realm and the dominions and territories thereunto belonging".

Originally a capital offence, the penalty was reduced in 1998 to life imprisonment.

Although the act was passed by the English Parliament, it was later extended to Scotland by the Treason Act 1708 (7 Ann. c. 21), following the Union of the two kingdoms in the previous year. The Parliament of Ireland passed a law to the same effect in 1703, the Treason Act (Ireland) 1703 (2 Anne c. 5 (I)). This is still in force in Northern Ireland.

== In fiction ==
- In the movie King Ralph, Ralph used the act as his justification in ordering the arrest of Lord Graves (John Hurt) on the grounds that Graves had interfered with Ralph's succession to the throne. After silently going through the Mnemonic Verse, he mentioned it was passed by William III, when in fact it was passed in the first year of Queen Anne's reign.
- In the movie Johnny English, the villain Pascal Sauvage (John Malkovich) is tried for treason under this Act when his plot to seize the throne is foiled, and the audience is told that the crime still carries a penalty of death by hanging. However, as the film was released in 2003 (the penalty was downgraded to life imprisonment in 1998), it renders the imposition of the death penalty inaccurate.

== Repeals ==
Sections 1, 2, 4, 10 and 11 of the act were repealed by the Statute Law Revision Act 1867 (30 & 31 Vict. c. 59. The rest of the act, except section 3, was repealed by the Promissory Oaths Act 1871 (c.48). Section 3 still remains in force.

== See also ==
- High treason in the United Kingdom
- Succession to the Crown Act 1707
- Treason Act
