= Declaration of Right, 1689 =

English constitutional document

The Declaration of Right, or Declaration of Rights, is a document produced by the English Parliament, following the 1688 Glorious Revolution. It sets out the wrongs committed by the exiled James II, the rights of English citizens, and the obligation of their monarch.

On 13 February 1689, it was read out to James' daughter, Mary, and her husband, William of Orange, when they were jointly offered the throne, although not made a condition of acceptance.

The Declaration itself was a tactical compromise between Whigs and Tories; it put forth a set of grievances, without agreeing to their cause or solution.

== Background ==
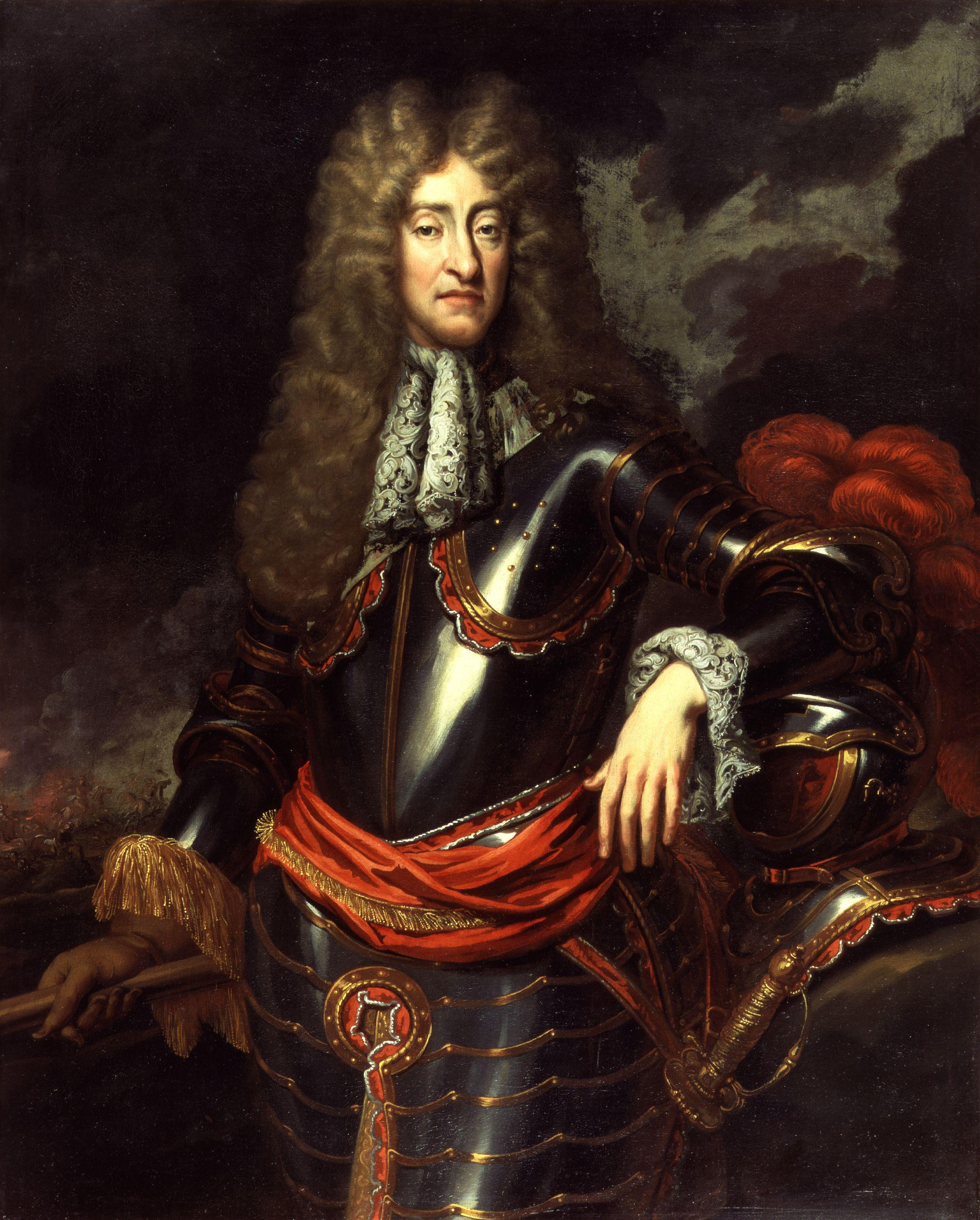
James II of England

The first Stuart monarch, James VI and I, sought to combine the three separate kingdoms of Scotland, Ireland, and England into a centralised British state, under a monarch whose authority came from God, and the duty of Parliament and his subjects was to obey. This premise was continued under his son and successor Charles I. Their attempts to enforce this led to the 1638 to 1651 Wars of the Three Kingdoms and execution of Charles I in 1649; the political conflict continued after the 1660 Restoration.

17th century society valued conformity, stability, and predictability. James II became king in 1685 with widespread backing from both Tories and Whigs, since the principle of hereditary succession was more important than his personal Catholicism. His religious reforms threatened to re-open the bitter conflicts of the past, and were viewed by Tories in particular as breaking his coronation oath, in which he swore to uphold the primacy of the Church of England. A direct threat to a society based on such oaths, it also brought back memories of his predecessors, who continually made commitments they later broke. (Note: This resulted in the 1688/1689 Coronation Oath Act)

In the 17th century, close links between religion and politics meant 'good government' required 'true religion', while society valued uniformity and stability; 'tolerance' was generally viewed as negative, since it undermined those values. For the same reason, Louis XIV of France gradually tightened controls on Protestants, who comprised 10% of the French population in 1600; the October 1685 Edict of Fontainebleau sent an estimated 200,000 to 400,000 into exile, 40,000 of whom settled in London. His expansionist policies threatened Protestant powers like England, the Dutch Republic, and Denmark-Norway; when the Edict was followed by the killing of 2,000 Vaudois Protestants in 1686, this led to fears Protestant Europe was threatened by a Catholic Counter-Reformation.

Historians generally accept James wished to promote Catholicism, not establish an absolutist state, but his inflexible reaction to opposition had the same result. When Parliament refused to repeal the 1678 and 1681 Test Acts, it was dismissed; attempts to rule by decree, and form a 'King's party' of Catholics and English Dissenters, undermined his own supporters. The result was the 1688 Glorious Revolution.

== Political context ==
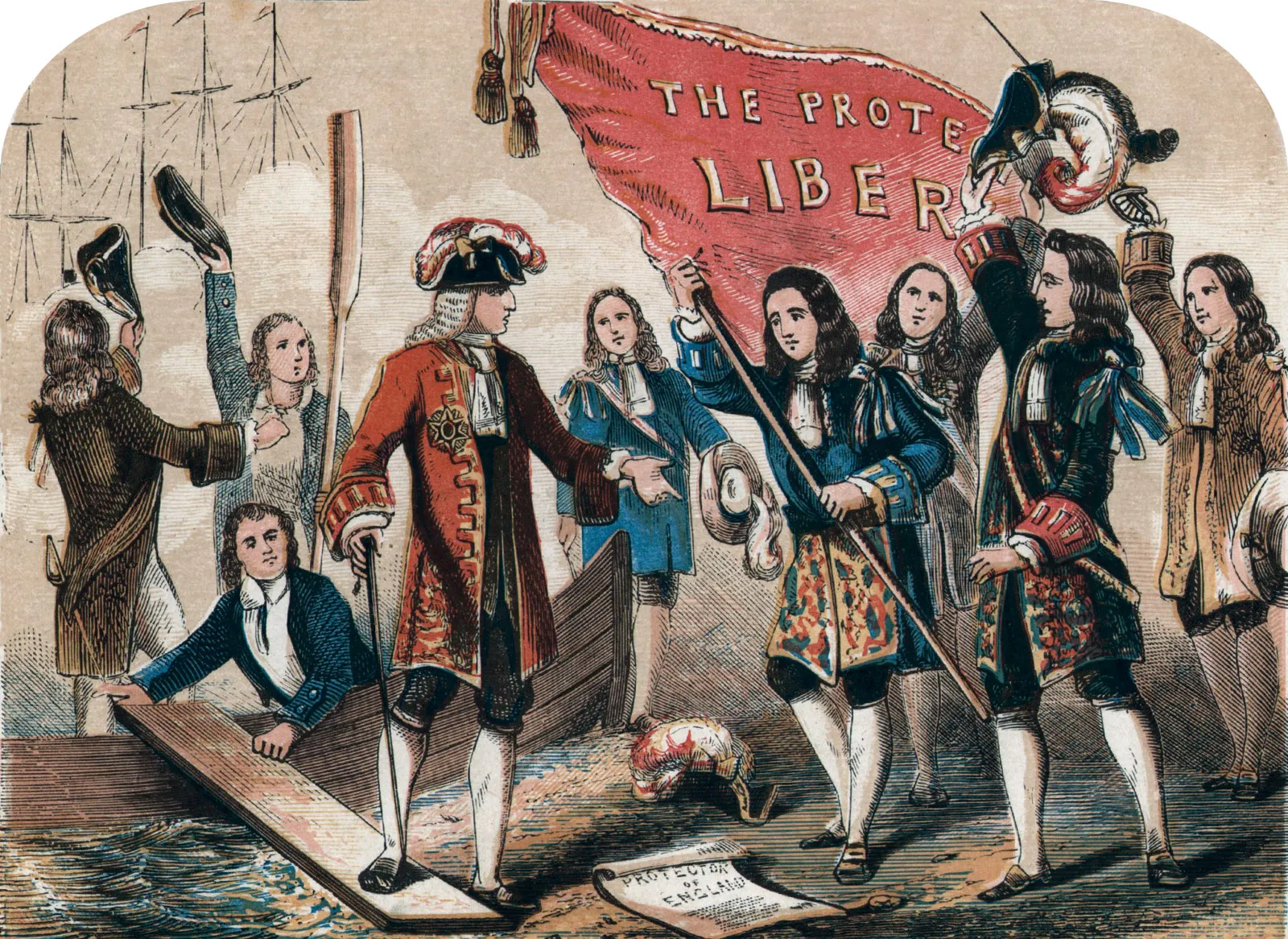
William III accepting the Declaration of Rights.

A key aspect of Stuart ideology was the Divine right of kings, which successive monarchs from James I to his grandson James II used to argue their actions and decisions were not subject to 'interference', whether by Parliament, the courts, or the church. However, although the king himself might be above the law, his servants were not, and thus could be prosecuted for illegal acts, even if they were only carrying out Royal instructions. In addition, the Anglican doctrine of passive obedience did not mean submission to 'unjust' laws, but accepting punishment for breaking them, as with the Seven Bishops. Modern historians argue James failed to appreciate the extent to which Royal power relied at the local level on the Landed gentry, and the loss of that support fatally damaged his regime.

Differences between Tories and Whigs are often overstated, since Tory elements within the Royal Army, like Charles Trelawny, brother of one of the Seven Bishops, were instrumental in deposing James, while the Act of Settlement 1701 which excluded the Catholic Stuart exiles from the throne was passed by a Tory government. In 1689, both factions generally agreed the king was bound to observe the law; the real battle was how and on what grounds James could be removed from the throne, possibly the most radical result of the Revolution.

The Declaration of Right was essentially a conservative document, which contained two main parts: a list of the wrongs, or grievances, committed by James, and 13 clauses establishing limits on Royal power and authority.

== Grievances ==
Note: In the following, quotation of the original text is in italic type, and the paraphrase is in roman.

Whereas the late King James the Second, by the assistance of [many] evil counsellors, judges and ministers employed by him, did endeavour to subvert and extirpate the Protestant religion and the laws and liberties of this kingdom...

1. By dispensing and suspending laws without the consent of Parliament. By assuming and exercising a power of dispensing with and suspending of laws and the execution of laws without consent of Parliament.
2. By prosecuting people for protesting the King's reign. By committing and prosecuting divers worthy prelates for humbly petitioning to be excused from concurring to the said assumed power.
3. By creating and using an organization affiliated with the Catholic Church. By issuing and causing to be executed a commission under the great seal for erecting a court called the Court of Commissioners for Ecclesiastical Causes.
4. By the use of funds by Crown for other purposes than the funds were originally granted for by Parliament. By levying money for and to the use of the Crown by the pretense of prerogative for other time and in another manner than the same was granted by Parliament.
5. By keeping a standing army in peacetime without the consent of Parliament. By raising and keeping a standing army within this kingdom in time of peace without consent of Parliament, and quartering soldiers contrary to law.
6. By stripping Protestants of arms and, at the same time, arming Catholics. By causing several good subjects being Protestants to be disarmed at the same time when papists were both armed and employed contrary to law.
7. By not allowing for the free elections of Parliament. By violating the freedom of election of members to serve in Parliament.
8. By doing parliament's business and illegally prosecuting those against him. By prosecutions in the Court of King's Bench for matters and causes cognizable only in Parliament, and by divers other arbitrary and illegal courses.
9. By placing corrupt jurors in court to pass judgment and placing jurors without land holdings in courts of high treason. And whereas of late years partial corrupt and unqualified persons have been returned and served on juries in trials, and particularly divers jurors in trials for high treason which were not freeholders.
10. By requiring excessive bail charges. And excessive bail hath been required of persons committed in criminal cases to elude the benefit of the laws made for the liberty of the subjects.
11. By imposing excessive fines. And excessive fines have been imposed.
12. By inflicting cruel and illegal punishments. And illegal and cruel punishments inflicted.
13. By imposing fines and seizing the property of people before their conviction. And several grants and promises made of fines and forfeitures before any conviction or judgment against the persons upon whom the same were to be levied.

All of which are utterly and directly contrary to the known laws and statutes and freedom of this realm.

== The 13 clauses limiting the power of the Crown ==
1. The power of suspending and executing laws rests in the hands of Parliament. That the pretended power of suspending the laws or the execution of laws by regal authority without consent of Parliament is illegal.
2. The Crown does not have the legal authority to dispense or execute laws. That the pretended power of dispensing with laws or the execution of laws by regal authority, as it hath been assumed and exercised of late, is illegal.
3. The establishment of any institution of the Catholic Church is illegal. That the commission for erecting the late Court of Commissioners for Ecclesiastical Causes, and all other commissions and courts of like nature, are illegal and pernicious.
4. The imposition of any taxes by the Crown without the permission of Parliament is illegal. That levying of money for or to the use of the Crown by pretence of prerogative, without grant of Parliament, for longer time, or in other manner than the same is or shall be granted, is illegal.
5. The citizens have the right to petition the king without fear of repercussions. That it is the right of the subjects to petition the king, and all commitments and prosecutions for such petitioning are illegal.
6. A standing army at peacetime without the consent of Parliament is illegal. That the raising or keeping a standing army within the kingdom in time of peace, unless it be with consent of Parliament, is against law.
7. All Protestants have the right to bear arms for defence. These the subjects which are Protestants may have arms for their defence suitable to their conditions and as allowed by law.
8. Parliament should be freely elected. That election of members of Parliament ought to be free.
9. Members of Parliament have the freedom of speech and their proceedings should not be questioned in any place outside of Parliament. That the freedom of speech and debates or proceedings in Parliament ought not to be impeached or questioned in any court or place out of Parliament.
10. Bail fees, excessive fines, and unusual punishments are illegal. That excessive bail ought not to be required, nor excessive fines imposed, nor cruel and unusual punishments inflicted.
11. All trials now require the presence of jurors and all jurors for trials of high treason must be land owners. That jurors ought to be duly impanelled and returned, and jurors which pass upon men in trials for high treason ought to be freeholders.
12. It is illegal to fine or seize the property of any person who has not been convicted and all previous fines and seizures are void. That all grants and promises of fines and forfeitures of particular persons before conviction are illegal and void.
13. Parliament should be held frequently to uphold the laws. And that for redress of all grievances, and for the amending, strengthening and preserving of the laws, Parliaments ought to be held frequently.

== Results ==
At their coronation on 11 April 1689, William and Mary swore to govern according to "the statutes in Parliament agreed on" instead of by "the laws and customs ... granted by the Kings of England", thus ending the threat of an absolutist reign. This non-violent overthrow of the monarch is known as the Glorious Revolution.

The Declaration of Right was written into the English Bill of Rights; it became law in December 1689 and is now considered part of the Constitution of the United Kingdom.

Some scholars have argued that the Glorious Revolution strengthened finances: "Douglas North and Barry Weingast's seminal account of the Glorious Revolution argued that specific constitutional reforms enhanced the credibility of the English Crown, leading to much stronger public finances." Other scholars argue that the Glorious Revolution was a turning point in history, starting the age of constitutionalism.

The format of a declaration enumerating various specific wrongs attributed to a king was followed a century later in the American Declaration of Independence – whose authors were clearly familiar with the 1689 document.

== See also ==
- Crown and Parliament Recognition Act 1689
- Financial Revolution
- Toleration Act 1689

== Sources ==
- Bosher, JF (February 1994). "The Franco-Catholic Danger, 1660–1715". History. 79 (255): 5–30. doi:10.1111/j.1468-229X.1994.tb01587.x. JSTOR 24421929.
- Cox, Gary, M. (22 August 2012). "Was the Glorious Revolution a Constitutional Watershed?". Journal of Economic History. 72 (3): 567–600. doi:10.1017/S0022050712000307. S2CID 54695981.
- Harris, Tim (1993). Politics Under the Later Stuarts: Party Conflict in a Divided Society, 1660-1715. Longman. ISBN 978-0-582-04081-6.
- Harris, Tim (2006). Revolution: The Great Crisis of the British Monarchy, 1685–1720. Allen Lane. ISBN 978-0-7139-9759-0.
- Harris, Tim; Taylor, Stephen, eds. (2015). The Final Crisis of the Stuart Monarchy. Boydell & Brewer. ISBN 978-1783270446.
- Harris, Tim (1999). "The People, the Law, and the Constitution in Scotland and England: A Comparative Approach to the Glorious Revolution". Journal of British Studies. 38 (1): 28–30. doi:10.1086/386180. S2CID 144374498.
- Miller, John (1978). James II; A study in kingship. Menthuen. ISBN 978-0413652904.
- Pincus, Steve (2009). 1688 The First Modern Revolution. Yale University. ISBN 978-0-300-17143-3.
- Spielvogel, Jackson J (1980). Western Civilization. Wadsworth Publishing. ISBN 1285436407.
- Stephen, Jeffrey (January 2010). "Scottish Nationalism and Stuart Unionism: The Edinburgh Council, 1745". Journal of British Studies. 49 (1, Scotland Special Issue): 47–72. doi:10.1086/644534. JSTOR 27752690. S2CID 144730991.
- "English Declaration of Rights". The Avalon Project. Yale University.
