= Rebuilding of London Act 1670 =

Act of the Parliament of England

- Act of Parliament
- Parliament of England
- Long title: An Act for the rebuilding of the City of London, uniting of Parishes and rebuilding of the Cathedral and Parochial Churches within the said City.
- Citation: 22 Cha. 2. c. 11
- Territorial extent: England and Wales

Dates
- Royal assent: 11 April 1670
- Commencement: 14 February 1670 (Note: Start of session.)
Other legislation
Amends	Rebuilding of London Act 1666
Amended by	City of London Sewerage Act 1771; London Wharves Act 1821; Newgate Market Abolition Act 1861
Relates to	Fire of London Disputes Act 1666; Rebuilding of London (Disputes) Act 1670; Fire of London, Property Disputes Act 1672

Status: Amended

Text of statute as originally enacted

The Rebuilding of London Act 1670 (22 Cha. 2. c. 11) is an act of the Parliament of England with the long title "Act for the rebuilding of the City of London, uniting of Parishes and rebuilding of the Cathedral and Parochial Churches within the said City."

In February 1667, the Rebuilding of London Act 1666 (18 & 19 Cha. 2. c. 8) (Note: This is the citation in The Statutes of the Realm.) was passed to rebuild the City of London following the Great Fire of London. This particular act extended the powers to enlarge streets and also ordered the rebuilding of St Paul's Cathedral.

As of 2025, the act remains in force in England and Wales.

== Wren and St. Paul's Cathedral ==
Fifty-one parish churches were rebuilt under the general direction of Christopher Wren (knighted in 1673). Today there are 23 left fairly intact, and ruins or only towers of a further six. Often the new church had the same outline as the pre-Fire building, or the tower was retained. Some of the designs may be by Robert Hooke (St Martin Ludgate), but it is clear that Wren only had a general overall control of all these projects.

Wren was principally concerned with St Paul's Cathedral. The first foundations, at the east end, were dug in 1675. The ruins of the west portico of Inigo Jones, in its day a noted piece of architecture, were regretfully removed by Wren in 1688. The choir was finished for a celebratory service in 1697, the dome was completed in 1708, and the cathedral declared finished in 1711.

Whether it is around the cathedral, during repairs to a Wren church or on some building sites, archaeological excavation in the City often finds evidence of the Fire and of the rebuilding, especially along the waterfront where the fire rubble was left in the streets and alleys to heighten the ground level against the Thames. This means that not only are some of the pre-Fire buildings saved for excavation, with walls up to five feet high, but the post-Fire improvements can be seen: wider alleys, and more construction in brick. Carved stones from destroyed churches were reused as rubble in foundations and walls, most notably in the crypt of the new St Paul's.

== Subsequent developments ==
The whole act "as relates to the public sewers, drains, vaults or pavements of the city and liberties" was repealed by section 121 of the City of London Sewerage Act 1771 (11 Geo. 3. c. 29), which came into force on 13 November 1770.

So much of the act "as restrains the Proprietors of Wharfs between London Bridge and the Temple from erecting any Buildings or Enclosures thereon" was repealed by section 1 of the London Wharves Act 1821 (1 & 2 Geo. 4. c. 89), which came into force on 10 July 1821.
