= Fire of London Disputes Act 1666 =

Act of the Parliament of England

- Act of Parliament
- Parliament of England
- Long title: An Act for erecting a Judicature for Determination of Differences touching Houses burned or demolished by reason of the late Fire which happened in London.
- Citation: 18 & 19 Cha. 2. c. 7 (Note: This is the citation in The Statutes of the Realm.); 19 Cha. 2. c. 2 (Note: This is the citation in The Statutes at Large.)
- Territorial extent: England and Wales

Dates
- Royal assent: 8 February 1667
- Commencement: 21 September 1666 (Note: Start of session.)
- Repealed: 30 July 1948
Other legislation
Amended by	Rebuilding of London Act 1670
Repealed by	Statute Law Revision Act 1948
Relates to	Rebuilding of London Act 1666

Status: Repealed

Text of statute as originally enacted

Fire of London, Property Disputes Act 1672
- Act of Parliament
- Parliament of England
- Long title: An Act for reviveing the Judicature for determination of Differences touching Houses burnt downe and demolished by reason of the late Fire, which happened in London, and for rebuilding of the Navy Office.
- Citation: 25 Cha. 2. c. 10
- Territorial extent: England and Wales

Dates
- Royal assent: 29 March 1673
- Commencement: 4 February 1673 (Note: Start of session.)
- Repealed: 30 July 1948
Other legislation
Repealed by	Statute Law Revision Act 1948
Relates to	Fire of London, Property Disputes Act 1672; Rebuilding of London Act 1670

Status: Repealed

Text of statute as originally enacted

The Fire of London Disputes Act 1666 (18 & 19 Cha. 2. c. 7) was an act of the Parliament of England with the long title "An Act for erecting a Judicature for Determination of Differences touching Houses burned or demolished by reason of the late Fire which happened in London." Following the Great Fire of London, Parliament established a court to settle all differences arising between landlords and tenants of burnt buildings, overseen by judges of the King's Bench, Court of Common Pleas and Court of Exchequer.

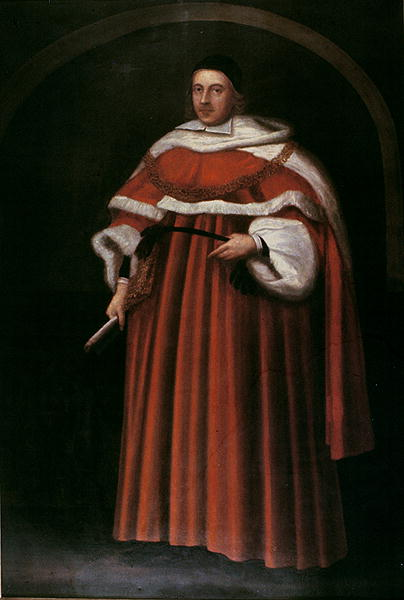
Portrait of Sir Matthew Hale, by Wright

The 22 judges who served under the act included the following:

- Sir John Archer
- Sir Robert Atkyns
- Sir Edward Atkins
- Sir Orlando Bridgeman
- Sir Samuel Brown
- Sir William Ellys
- Sir Heneage Finch
- Sir Matthew Hale
- Sir John Kelynge
- Sir Timothy Littleton
- Sir William Morton
- Sir Francis North
- Sir Richard Rainsford
- Sir Edward Thurland
- Sir Christopher Turnor
- Sir Edward Turnour
- Sir Thomas Twisden
- Sir Thomas Tyrrell
- Sir John Vaughan
- Sir William Wilde
- Sir Hugh Wyndham
- Sir Wadham Wyndham

Portraits of the judges by John Michael Wright were put up in the Guildhall by the city in gratitude for their services. Their "Sunderland" style picture frames were made by Mary Ashfield, Mary Fleshier, Mary Dorrell, and John Norris between 1671 and 1675. The paintings, completed in 1670, hung in London's Guildhall until it was bombed during World War II; today only two (those of Sir Matthew Hale and Sir Hugh Wyndham) remain in the Guildhall Art Gallery the remainder having been destroyed or dispersed, mainly to the Inner Temple, Lincoln's Inn and the Royal Courts of justice.

The whole act was repealed by section 1 of, and the first schedule to, the Statute Law Revision Act 1948 (11 & 12 Geo. 6. c. 62), which came into force on 30 July 1948.

== See also ==
- Rebuilding of London Act 1666
