= Rebuilding of London Act 1666 =

Act of the Parliament of England

- Act of Parliament
- Parliament of England
- Long title: An Act for rebuilding the City of London.
- Citation: 18 & 19 Cha. 2. c. 8 (Note: This is the citation in The Statutes of the Realm.); 19 Cha. 2. c. 3 (Note: This is the citation in The Statutes at Large.)
- Territorial extent: England and Wales

Dates
- Royal assent: 8 February 1667
- Commencement: 21 September 1666 (Note: Start of session.)
- Repealed: 1 January 1849
Other legislation
Amended by	Rebuilding of London Act 1670; City of London Sewerage Act 1771
Repealed by	City of London Sewers Act 1848
Relates to	Fire of London Disputes Act 1666; Rebuilding of London (Disputes) Act 1670; Fire of London, Property Disputes Act 1672

Status: Repealed

Text of statute as originally enacted

The Rebuilding of London Act 1666 (18 & 19 Cha. 2. c. 8) was an act of the Parliament of England with the long title "An Act for rebuilding the City of London." The act was passed in February 1667 in the aftermath of the Great Fire of London and drawn up by Sir Matthew Hale. An earlier act, the Fire of London Disputes Act 1666 (18 & 19 Cha. 2. c. 7), had set up a court to settle disputes arising from buildings destroyed by the Fire. This act regulated the rebuilding, authorised the City of London Corporation to reopen and widen roads, designated the anniversary of the Fire a feast day, and authorised the building of the Monument. A duty of one shilling (Note: about £10 today) on a chaldron (Note: at the time weighing approximately 2.67 tonnes (2.63 long tons)) of coal was imposed to pay for these measures.

== Building regulations ==
Within a few days of the fire, several proposals for restructuring the city had been put forward by various leading citizens, including Christopher Wren, Robert Hooke, and John Evelyn. Most of the suggested plans involved restructuring the medieval city's roads into a grid pattern, and were rejected on the grounds that re-parcelling all the land would have been too difficult, time-intensive, and costly. Keeping Londoners in the city and salvaging its economy were top priorities, and thus the act focused on putting straightforward, common-sense building regulations into place as soon as possible. In order to prevent improper construction by over-eager Londoners, the act included a provision to demolish any new buildings that had been erected without adhering to the act's regulations. Measures were included to attract workmen to the city, and to prevent price gouging of materials or labour.

Among other things, the act added or modified regulations to:

- Architectural styles of buildings on designated High Streets
- Heights of private homes
- Building materials (brick and stone preferred)
- Wall thicknesses
- Street widths
- Buildings within 40 feet of the Thames
- Jetties and similar overhangs (banned)

== Subsequent developments ==
The overall effect was meant to be “harmonious and orderly, [but] without excessive standardisation.”

Between 1667 and 1670, the coal tax only raised £23,000 of the expected £100,000; the duty was later increased to 3 shillings in the Rebuilding of London Act 1670 (22 Cha. 2. c. 11) in order to raise enough money to fund the rebuilding the city's churches, including St. Paul's Cathedral.

The whole act "as relates to the public sewers, drains, vaults or pavements of the city and liberties" was repealed by section 121 of the City of London Sewerage Act 1771 (11 Geo. 3. c. 29), which came into force on 13 November 1770.

The whole act was repealed by section 1 of the City of London Sewers Act 1848 (11 & 12 Vict. c. clxiii), which came into force on 1 January 1849.

One of the biggest challenges they faced was finding enough money to rebuild. The city relied heavily on multiple different sources of funding, like borrowing and putting a tax on coal, to help pay for the reconstruction. Rebuilding major landmarks like St. Paul's Cathedral was really challenging because of the overall cost of materials and the difficulty of transporting the stone. The rebuild process required a lot of careful planning because the city was dealing with the problem of balancing the total cost of construction with the needs of rebuilding the historically important building and the public spaces. A lot of that important funding came through borrowing from citizens and the tax on coal. Even with the funding the rebuilding process still was long and tedious.

Another major problem involved determining the property boundaries after so many of the buildings were destroyed. Robert Hooke played a huge important role in surveying the damaged areas and helped establish the property lines. his work also helped support the reconstruction and address the disagreement between all the property owners. Hookes surveys were also important because his work helped identify where the new building would be reconstructed. His role also showed how important he was to rebuilding London and it was a bigger process than just getting enough construction workers. The surveyors a crucial role in organizing the cities recovery.]

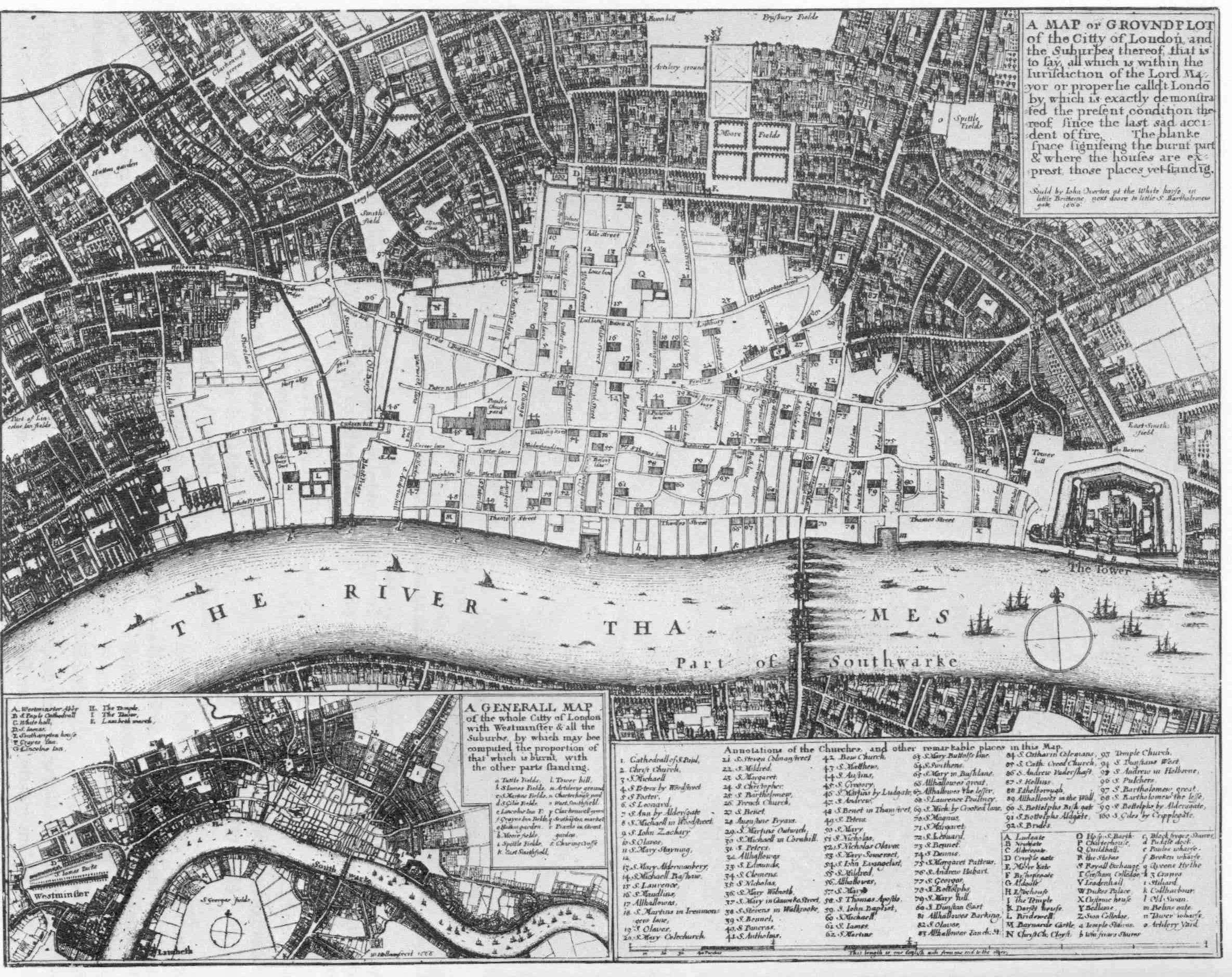
Map showing the areas of London destroyed by the Great Fire of 1666.

There was also disagreements about how London should be rebuilt, This included different plans that were proposed to improve the citys overall layout, but rebuilding had to account for the existing property boundaries and the needs of those residents had to be met. These challenges made the reconstruction more complicated than simpliy just replacing the buildings that had burned down. The new proposed designs for the city was to organize the layout in a way that created better streets and public spaces. It wasn't that easy to accomplish the already existing layout and property boundaries made it really hard to complete the vision that they had for the new London layout. This caused the rebuilding process to involve a lot of extra factors that had to balance new ideas with the cities already existing structures.

== See also ==
- Rebuilding of London Act 1670
- Great Fire of London
