= London, Quo Warranto Judgment Reversed Act 1689 =

Act of the Parliament of England

- Act of Parliament
- Parliament of England
- Long title: An Act for Reversing the Judgment in a Quo Warranto against the City of London and for Restoreing the City of London to its antient Rights and Privileges.
- Citation: 2 Will. & Mar. c. 8
- Territorial extent: England and Wales

Dates
- Royal assent: 20 May 1690
- Commencement: 20 March 1690 (Note: Start of session.)
Other legislation
| Amended by | City of London Sewerage Act 1771 |

Status: Amended

Text of statute as originally enacted

The London, Quo Warranto Judgment Reversed Act 1689 (2 Will. & Mar. c. 8) is an act of the Parliament of England, the long title of which is "An Act for Reversing the Judgment in a Quo Warranto against the City of London and for Restoreing the City of London to its antient Rights and Privileges".

Enacted shortly after the Glorious Revolution, it restored various valuable privileges of the officers, companies, and corporations of the City of London that had been seized under a writ of quo warranto by Charles II and James II to augment the royal revenue. Noorthouck writes, "[T]his being the last confirmation of the rights and privileges of the citizens [of London], [it] ought justly to be known by all."

== Subsequent developments ==
The whole act "as relates to the public sewers, drains, vaults or pavements of the city and liberties" was repealed by section 121 of the City of London Sewerage Act 1771 (11 Geo. 3. c. 29), which came into force on 13 November 1770.
