= List of acts of the Parliament of Scotland from 1689 =

This is a list of acts of the Parliament of Scotland for the year 1689.

It lists acts of Parliament of the old Parliament of Scotland, that was merged with the old Parliament of England to form the Parliament of Great Britain, by the Union with England Act 1707 (c. 7).

For other years, see list of acts of the Parliament of Scotland. For the period after 1707, see list of acts of the Parliament of Great Britain.

== 1689 ==
=== March ===
Convention of the Estates of Scotland, held in Edinburgh from 14 March 1689 to 24 May 1689.

Short title, or popular name	Citation	Royal assent
Long title
Declaration as to this Meeting Act 1689 (repealed)	March 1689 c. 1 (Note: This is the citation in the Record Edition.); 1689 c. 2 (Note: This is the citation in the Duodecimal Edition.)	16 March 1689
Act declaring this to be a free & lawful meeting of the Estates. Act declaring this to be a free and lawful meeting of the Estates. (Repealed by Statute Law Revision (Scotland) Act 1906 (6 Edw. 7. c. 38))
Public Revenue Act 1689 (repealed)	March 1689 c. 2; 1689 c. 3	18 March 1689
Proclamation for bringing in the bygone arrears of the publick Revenue. Proclamation for bringing in the bygone arrears of the public Revenue. (Repealed by Statute Law Revision (Scotland) Act 1906 (6 Edw. 7. c. 38))
Defence of the Realm Act 1689 (repealed)	March 1689 c. 3; 1689 c. 4	19 March 1689
Act for putting the Kingdome in a posture of defence. Act for putting the Kingdom in a posture of defence. (Repealed by Statute Law Revision (Scotland) Act 1906 (6 Edw. 7. c. 38))
Militia Act 1689 (repealed)	March 1689 c. 4 — (Note: This act is not listed in the Duodecimal Edition.)	19 March 1689
Act nominating the officers of Militia in the shyre of Berwick. Act nominating the officers of Militia in the shire of Berwick. (Repealed by Statute Law Revision (Scotland) Act 1906 (6 Edw. 7. c. 38))
Military Oath Act 1689 (repealed)	March 1689 c. 5	19 March 1689
An Order anent an Oath to be taken by persones in military Imployments. An Order about an Oath to be taken by persons in military employment. (Repealed by Promissory Oaths Act 1871 (34 & 35 Vict. c. 48))
Address to Prince of Orange Act 1689 (repealed)	March 1689 c. 6	19 March 1689
Act approving the Address made by the Noblemen and Gentlemen to His Highnes the Prince of Orange. Act approving the Address made by the Noblemen and Gentlemen to His Highness the Prince of Orange. (Repealed by Statute Law Revision (Scotland) Act 1906 (6 Edw. 7. c. 38))
Papists Act 1689 (repealed)	March 1689 c. 7	20 March 1689
Proclamation against Papists. Proclamation against Papists. (Repealed by Statute Law Revision (Scotland) Act 1906 (6 Edw. 7. c. 38))
Not public and general	March 1689 c. 8 —	20 March 1689
Act Appoynting Mr William Rodger Collector of the supply of the shyre of Air. Act Appointing Mr William Rodger Collector of the supply of the shire of Ayr.
Not public and general	March 1689 c. 9 —	22 March 1689
Act of Approbation in favors of the Earle of Tweddale. Act of Approbation in favour of the Earl of Tweddale.
Suspect Persons Act 1689 (repealed)	March 1689 c. 10; 1689 c. 8	23 March 1689
Act for securing suspect persones. Act for securing suspect persons (Repealed by Statute Law Revision (Scotland) Act 1906 (6 Edw. 7. c. 38))
Defence of the Realm (No. 2) Act 1689 (repealed)	March 1689 c. 11 —	23 March 1689
Act for distribution of the Armes amongst the westerne shyres. Act for distribution of the Arms amongst the western shires. (Repealed by Statute Law Revision (Scotland) Act 1906 (6 Edw. 7. c. 38))
Committee for Settling Government Act 1689 (repealed)	Vol. IX, p. 22; 1689 c. 10	26 March 1689
A proposall to name a committee for setling the government. A proposal to name a committee for settling the government. (Repealed by Statute Law Revision (Scotland) Act 1906 (6 Edw. 7. c. 38))
Services in Western Shires Act 1689 (repealed)	March 1689 c. 12 —	28 March 1689
Act Approving the good services done by severall persones belonging to Glasgow Argyle & uther western shyres. Act Approving the good services done by several persons belonging to Glasgow, Argyll and other western shires. (Repealed by Statute Law Revision (Scotland) Act 1906 (6 Edw. 7. c. 38))
Glasgow Act 1689 (repealed)	March 1689 c. 13 —	28 March 1689
Act in favors of the Inhabitants of Glasgow. Act in favour of the inhabitants of Glasgow. (Repealed by Statute Law Revision (Scotland) Act 1906 (6 Edw. 7. c. 38))
Not public and general	March 1689 c. 14 —	28 March 1689
Act appointing James Crawfurd of Monquhanney Collector of the Cesse in ffyfe. Act appounting James Crawford of Montquhanie Collector of the Cess in Fife.
Militia (No. 2) Act 1689 (repealed)	March 1689 c. 15; 1689 c. 11	30 March 1689
Proclamation for Calling together the Militia on this syde of Tay and the fencible men in some shyres. Proclamation for Calling together the Militia on this side of Tay, and the fencible men in some shires. (Repealed by Statute Law Revision (Scotland) Act 1906 (6 Edw. 7. c. 38))
Militia (No. 3) Act 1689 (repealed)	March 1689 c. 16 —	30 March 1689
Act anent the Militia Men in the Towne of Edinburgh. Act about the Militia Men in the Town of Edinburgh. (Repealed by Statute Law Revision (Scotland) Act 1906 (6 Edw. 7. c. 38))
Not public and general	March 1689 c. 17 —	2 April 1689
Act in favors of Captain Edward Bryce and the Irish Protestants. Act in favour of Captain Edward Bryce and the Irish Protestants.
Not public and general	March 1689 c. 18 —	2 April 1689
Act in favors of the Magistrates of Inverness for ammunition. Act in favour of the Magistrates of Inverness for ammunition.
Not public and general	March 1689 c. 19 —	2 April 1689
Act in favors of the Countess of Nithisdaill. Act in favour of the Countess of Nithsdale.
Edinburgh Act 1689 (repealed)	March 1689 c. 20 —	2 April 1689
Act in favors of the Toune of Edinburgh. Act in favour of the Town of Edinburgh. (Repealed by Statute Law Revision (Scotland) Act 1906 (6 Edw. 7. c. 38))
Glasgow (No. 2) Act 1689 (repealed)	March 1689 c. 21 —	2 April 1689
Act anent transporting of Armes to Glasgow. Act about transporting of Arms to Glasgow. (Repealed by Statute Law Revision (Scotland) Act 1906 (6 Edw. 7. c. 38))
Edinburgh (No. 2) Act 1689 (repealed)	March 1689 c. 22 —	5 April 1689
Act for a new Nomination of Magistrates in the Towne of Edinburgh. Act for a new Nomination of Magistrates in the Town of Edinburgh. (Repealed by Statute Law Revision (Scotland) Act 1906 (6 Edw. 7. c. 38))
Suspect Persons (No. 2) Act 1689 (repealed)	March 1689 c. 23; 1689 c. 12	8 April 1689
Warrand to the Duke of Hamilton to secure suspect persones. Warrant to the Duke of Hamilton to secure suspect persons. (Repealed by Statute Law Revision (Scotland) Act 1906 (6 Edw. 7. c. 38))
Fiars Prices Act 1689 (repealed)	March 1689 c. 24 —	8 April 1689
Act appoynting the shireffe fiers to be the pryce of victuall payable to the Exchequer for the Cropt 1688. Act appointing the sheriff fiars to be the price of victual payable to the Exchequer for the Crop for 1688. (Repealed by Statute Law Revision (Scotland) Act 1906 (6 Edw. 7. c. 38))
Not public and general	March 1689 c. 25 —	8 April 1689
Act in favors of Sir James Makgill of Rankilour. Act in favour of Sir James MacGill of Rankeilour.
Not public and general	March 1689 c. 26 —	8 April 1689
Act in favors of Mr Richard Hay to remove from the Kingdom. Act in favour of Mr Richard Hay to leave the Kingdom.
Glasgow (No. 3) Act 1689 (repealed)	March 1689 c. 27 —	8 April 1689
Act in favors of the Heretors within the Towne of Glasgow. Act in favour of the Heritors within the Town of Glasgow. (Repealed by Statute Law Revision (Scotland) Act 1906 (6 Edw. 7. c. 38))
Claim of Right 1689 still in force	March 1689 c. 28; 1689 c. 13	11 April 1689
The Declaration of the Estates of the Kingdom of Scotland containing the Claim of Right and the offer of the Croune to the King and Queen of England. The Declaration of the Estates of the Kingdom of Scotland containing the Claim of Right and the offer of the Crown to the King and Queen of England.
Proclamation of King and Queen Act 1689 (repealed)	March 1689 c. 29; 1689 c. 14	11 April 1689
Proclamation declaring William & Mary King & Queen of England to be King and Queen of Scotland. Proclamation declaring William and Mary, King and Queen of England, to be King and Queen of Scotland. (Repealed by Statute Law Revision (Scotland) Act 1906 (6 Edw. 7. c. 38))
Government until Acceptance of Crown Act 1689 (repealed)	March 1689 c. 30; 1689 c. 15	11 April 1689
Act declaring that the Estates are to continue in the Government until the King and Queen of England accept the Croune. Act declaring that the Estates are to continue in the Government until the King and Queen of England accept the Crown. (Repealed by Statute Law Revision (Scotland) Act 1906 (6 Edw. 7. c. 38))
Not public and general	March 1689 c. 31 —	12 April 1689
Act in favors of the Collector at Leith against some Merchants. Act in favour of the Collector at Leith against some Merchants.
Dundee Act 1689 (repealed)	March 1689 c. 32 —	12 April 1689
Act for a new Election of Magistrates in the toun of Dundee. Act for a new Election of Magistrates in the town of Dundee. (Repealed by Statute Law Revision (Scotland) Act 1906 (6 Edw. 7. c. 38))
Attendance at Meeting Act 1689 (repealed)	March 1689 c. 33 —	12 April 1689
Proclamation ordaining the absent Members from the Meeting of the Estates to attend. Proclamation ordaining the absent Members from the Meeting of the Estates to attend. (Repealed by Statute Law Revision (Scotland) Act 1906 (6 Edw. 7. c. 38))
Allegiance to William and Mary Act 1689 (repealed)	March 1689 c. 34; 1689 c. 16	13 April 1689
Proclamation against owning of the late King James and appoynting publick prayers for William & Mary King and Queen of Scotland. Proclamation against owning of the late King James and appointing public prayers for William and Mary, King and Queen of Scotland. (Repealed by Statute Law Revision (Scotland) Act 1906 (6 Edw. 7. c. 38))
Proclamation of King and Queen (No. 2) Act 1689 (repealed)	March 1689 c. 35; 1689 c. 17	13 April 1689
Additional Warrand for publishing the Proclamation of William & Mary King & Queen of Scotland. Additional Warrant for publishing the Proclamation of William and Mary, King and Queen of Scotland. (Repealed by Statute Law Revision (Scotland) Act 1906 (6 Edw. 7. c. 38))
Militia (No. 4) Act 1689 (repealed)	March 1689 c. 36 —	13 April 1689
Act anent the Militia. Act about the Militia. (Repealed by Statute Law Revision (Scotland) Act 1906 (6 Edw. 7. c. 38))
Not public and general	March 1689 c. 37 —	13 April 1689
Act in favors of some Merchants of Derry and Belfast in Ireland. Act in favour of some Merchants of Derry and Belfast in Ireland.
Shipping on West Coast Act 1689 (repealed)	March 1689 c. 38; 1689 c. 19	16 April 1689
Warrand for ane Embargo upon ships and uther vessells on the Westerne Coast of Scotland. Warrant for an Embargo upon ships and other vessels on the Western Coast of Scotland. (Repealed by Statute Law Revision (Scotland) Act 1906 (6 Edw. 7. c. 38))
Not public and general	March 1689 c. 39 —	16 April 1689
Act in favors of Thomas Richardson late servitor to the Duke of Gordon. Act in favour of Thomas Richardson, late servant to the Duke of Gordon.
Not public and general	March 1689 c. 40 —	16 April 1689
Act in favors of Walter Scott of Lethome. Act in favour of Walter Scott of Letham.
Not public and general	March 1689 c. 41 —	16 April 1689
Act in favors of James Bruce of Kinloch. Act in favour of James Bruce of Kinloch.
Not public and general	March 1689 c. 42 —	16 April 1689
Act in favors of Patrick Seatoun of Lathrisk. Act in favour of Patrick Seaton of Lathrisk.
Edinburgh Act 1689 (repealed)	March 1689 c. 43 —	16 April 1689
Act in favours of the Good Towne of Edinburgh for disbanding the Company under the Command of Captain Grahame. Act in favour of the Good Town of Edinburgh, for disbanding the Company under the Command of Captain Graham. (Repealed by Statute Law Revision (Scotland) Act 1906 (6 Edw. 7. c. 38))
Rothesy Act 1689 (repealed)	March 1689 c. 44 —	16 April 1689
Act for a new Election of Magistrates in the Burgh of Rothesay. Act for a new Election of Magistrates in the Burgh of Rothesay. (Repealed by Statute Law Revision (Scotland) Act 1906 (6 Edw. 7. c. 38))
Levy of Horsemen Act 1689 (repealed)	March 1689 c. 45; 1689 c. 20	18 April 1689
Act for a levy of Horsemen out of the severall shyres of the Kingdom. Act for a levy of horsemen out of the several shires of the Kingdom. (Repealed by Statute Law Revision (Scotland) Act 1906 (6 Edw. 7. c. 38))
Oath by King and Queen Act 1689 (repealed)	March 1689 c. 46; 1689 c. 21	18 April 1689
The Oath to be administered to the King and Queen at their acceptance of the Croune. The Oath to be administered to the King and Queen at their acceptance of the Crown. (Repealed by Statute Law Revision (Scotland) Act 1906 (6 Edw. 7. c. 38))
Protestants from Ireland Act 1689 (repealed)	March 1689 c. 47 —	18 April 1689
Act in favors of the British Protestants comed from Ireland. Act in favour of the British Protestants come from Ireland. (Repealed by Statute Law Revision (Scotland) Act 1906 (6 Edw. 7. c. 38))
Elections of Magistrates Act 1689 (repealed)	March 1689 c. 48; 1689 c. 22	18 April 1689
Act for a new Election of Magistrates in the severall Royall Burghes. Act for a new Election of Magistrates in the several Royal Burghs. (Repealed by Statute Law Revision (Scotland) Act 1906 (6 Edw. 7. c. 38))
Infantry Act 1689 (repealed)	March 1689 c. 49; 1689 c. 23	18 April 1689
Act for levying some Regiments of foot. Act for levying some Regiments of foot. (Repealed by Statute Law Revision (Scotland) Act 1906 (6 Edw. 7. c. 38))
Irvine Act 1689 (repealed)	March 1689 c. 50 —	18 April 1689
Act for a new Election of Magistrates in Irvine. Act for a new Election of Magistrates in Irvine. (Repealed by Statute Law Revision (Scotland) Act 1906 (6 Edw. 7. c. 38))
Shipping Act 1689 (repealed)	March 1689 c. 51 —	18 April 1689
Additional Act concerning the Embargo. Additional Act concerning the Embargo. (Repealed by Statute Law Revision (Scotland) Act 1906 (6 Edw. 7. c. 38))
Two Ships for Public Service Act 1689 (repealed)	March 1689 c. 52 —	18 April 1689
Act for valueing the two ships ordered to be fitted out for the public service. Act for valuing the two ships ordered to be fitted out for the public service. (Repealed by Statute Law Revision (Scotland) Act 1906 (6 Edw. 7. c. 38))
Not public and general	March 1689 c. 53 —	18 April 1689
Act in favors of Mr Thomas Harvy Minister. Act in favour of Mr Thomas Harvey, Minister.
Cavalry Act 1689 (repealed)	March 1689 c. 54; 1689 c. 24	22 April 1689
Act for Modelling the 500 horses in ten troopes. Act for Modelling the 500 horses in ten troops. (Repealed by Statute Law Revision (Scotland) Act 1906 (6 Edw. 7. c. 38))
Garrison in Arran Act 1689 (repealed)	March 1689 c. 55 —	22 April 1689
Act and Commission in favours of His Grace the Duke of Hamiltoun for a Garrisone in the Castle of Arran. Act and Commission in favour of His Grace the Duke of Hamilton for a Garrison in the Castle of Arran. (Repealed by Statute Law Revision (Scotland) Act 1906 (6 Edw. 7. c. 38))
Dunnottar Castle Act 1689 (repealed)	March 1689 c. 56 —	22 April 1689
Act and Commission in favours of the Earl Marishall for a Garrisone in the Castle of Dunnotter. Act and Commission in favour of the Earl Marshal for a Garrison in the Castle of Dunnotter. (Repealed by Statute Law Revision (Scotland) Act 1906 (6 Edw. 7. c. 38))
Shipping (No. 2) Act 1689 (repealed)	March 1689 c. 57; 1689 c. 25	23 April 1689
Act ordering ane Embargo on all ships. Act ordering an Embargo on all ships. (Repealed by Statute Law Revision (Scotland) Act 1906 (6 Edw. 7. c. 38))
Forage for Army Act 1689 (repealed)	March 1689 c. 58 —	23 April 1689
Act ordering the Rates of oates hay & straw for His Majesties forces. Act ordering the Rates of oats, hay and straw for His Majesty's forces. (Repealed by Statute Law Revision (Scotland) Act 1906 (6 Edw. 7. c. 38))
Not public and general	March 1689 c. 59 —	23 April 1689
Act in favors of William Bennet younger of Grubbet for a Troope of Horse. Act in favour of William Bennett younger of Grubbet for a Troop of Horse.
Union with England Act 1689 (repealed)	March 1689 c. 60; 1689 c. 26	23 April 1689
Act nominating Commissioners to treate concerning the Union of the Two Kingdomes. Act nominating Commissioners to treat concerning the Union of the Two Kingdoms. (Repealed by Statute Law Revision (Scotland) Act 1906 (6 Edw. 7. c. 38))
Offer of Crown Act 1689 (repealed)	March 1689 c. 61; 1689 c. 28	24 April 1689
Act nominating persones to attend their Majesties with the offer of the Croune. Act nominating persons to attend their Majesties with the offer of the Crown. (Repealed by Statute Law Revision (Scotland) Act 1906 (6 Edw. 7. c. 38))
Not public and general	March 1689 c. 62 —	24 April 1689
Act in favors of John Campbell of Airds. Act in favour of John Campbell of Airds.
Not public and general	March 1689 c. 63 —	24 April 1689
Act in favors of the daughters of Alexander McIntosh of Conadge. Act in favour of the daughters of Alexander MacIntosh of Connage.
Not public and general	March 1689 c. 64 —	25 April 1689
Act in favors of John Shaw younger of Greenock. Act in favour of John Shaw younger of Greenock.
Not public and general	March 1689 c. 65 —	25 April 1689
Act in favors of Sir Andrew Agnew of Lochnaw reponing him to the sherriffship of Wigtoun. Act in favour of Sir Andrew Agnewof Lochnaw, restoring him to the sheriffship of Wigtown.
Not public and general	March 1689 c. 66 —	25 April 1689
Act in favors of Lieutenant Colonell John Balfour of Fairnie. Act in favour of Lieutenant Colonel John Balfour of Fairney.
Not public and general	March 1689 c. 67 —	25 April 1689
Act & Remit in favors of George Drummond Keeper of the tolbuith of Edinburgh. Act and remit in favour of George Drummond, keeper of the tollbooth of Edinburgh.
Thanksgiving Act 1689 (repealed)	March 1689 c. 68; 1689 c. 31	26 April 1689
A Proclamation for a publick Thanksgiving. A Proclamation for a public Thanksgiving. (Repealed by Statute Law Revision (Scotland) Act 1906 (6 Edw. 7. c. 38))
Collection of Customs Act 1689 (repealed)	March 1689 c. 69 —	26 April 1689
Act in favors of the Collector of the Customes and Excyse at Leith. Act in favour of the Collector of the Customs and Excise at Leith. (Repealed by Statute Law Revision (Scotland) Act 1906 (6 Edw. 7. c. 38))
Not public and general	March 1689 c. 70 —	26 April 1689
Act in favors of Charles Earle of Marr reponing him to the office of Governour & Keeper of the Castle of Stirling. Act in favour of Charles Earl of Mar, restoring him to the office of Governor and Keeper of the Castle of Stirling.
Not public and general	March 1689 c. 71 —	26 April 1689
Act in favors of Gustavus Hamilton Esquire. Act in favour of Gustavus Hamilton, Esquire.
Not public and general	March 1689 c. 72 —	26 April 1689
Act in favors of Robert Broun of Bishoptoun. Act in favour of Robert Brown of Bishopton.
Supply Act 1689 (repealed)	March 1689 c. 74; 1689 c. 32	27 April 1689
Act for raising Four Moneths Supply. Act for raising Four Months' Supply. (Repealed by Statute Law Revision (Scotland) Act 1906 (6 Edw. 7. c. 38))
Forfeited Persons Act 1689 (repealed)	March 1689 c. 75; 1689 c. 33	27 April 1689
Act in favors of the Vassalls & Creditors of forfaulted persones. Act in favour of the Vassals and Creditors of forfeited persons. (Repealed by Statute Law Revision (Scotland) Act 1906 (6 Edw. 7. c. 38))
Not public and general	March 1689 c. 76 —	27 April 1689
Act in favors of Robert Gib merchant in Stirling. Act in favour of Robert Gibb merchant in Stirling.
Not public and general	March 1689 c. 77 —	27 April 1689
Act in favors of Captaine Edward Bryce. Act in favour of Captain Edward Bryce.
Not public and general	March 1689 c. 78 —	27 April 1689
Act in favors of the Boatmen of Bruntisland and Kinghorne. Act in favour of the boatmen of Burntisland and Kinghorn.
Irish and French Protestants Act 1689 (repealed)	March 1689 c. 79; 1689 c. 34	29 April 1689
Act for a voluntar Contribution to the Irish and French Protestants. Act for a voluntary Contribution to the Irish and French Protestants. (Repealed by Statute Law Revision (Scotland) Act 1906 (6 Edw. 7. c. 38))
Committee of Estates Act 1689 (repealed)	March 1689 c. 80; 1689 c. 35	29 April 1689
Commission to the Committee of Estates. Commission to the Committee of Estates. (Repealed by Statute Law Revision (Scotland) Act 1906 (6 Edw. 7. c. 38))
Ayr Act 1689 (repealed)	March 1689 c. 81 —	29 April 1689
Act in favors of the Magistrates of Air. Act in favour of the Magistrates of Ayr. (Repealed by Statute Law Revision (Scotland) Act 1906 (6 Edw. 7. c. 38))
Not public and general	March 1689 c. 82 —	29 April 1689
Act for liberation of Mr Alexander Malcolme of Lochore. Act for liberation of Mr Alexander Malcolm of Lochore.
Not public and general	March 1689 c. 83 —	29 April 1689
Act for setting David Lindsay at libertie. Act for setting David Lindsay at liberty.
Adjournment Act 1689 (repealed)	March 1689 c. 84; 1689 c. 36	29 April 1689
Act of Adjournment of the Meeting of Estates. Act of Adjournment of the Meeting of Estates. (Repealed by Statute Law Revision (Scotland) Act 1906 (6 Edw. 7. c. 38))
Attendance of Absent Members Act 1689 (repealed)	March 1689 c. 85 —	21 May 1689
Proclamation requiring the absent Members to attend. Proclamation requiring the absent members to attend. (Repealed by Statute Law Revision (Scotland) Act 1906 (6 Edw. 7. c. 38))
Supply (No. 2) Act 1689 (repealed)	March 1689 c. 86 —	21 May 1689
Act for a new meeting of the Commissioners of Supply in some shyres. Act for a new meeting of the Commissioners of Supply in some shires. (Repealed by Statute Law Revision (Scotland) Act 1906 (6 Edw. 7. c. 38))
Supply (No. 3) Act 1689 (repealed)	March 1689 c. 87 —	21 May 1689
Act containing a new Nomination of Commissioners for the Supply in the shyre of Aberdeen. Act containing a new Nomination of Commissioners for the Supply in the shire of Aberdeen. (Repealed by Statute Law Revision (Scotland) Act 1906 (6 Edw. 7. c. 38))
Not public and general	March 1689 c. 88 —	21 May 1689
Act concerning the Earle Marschell and the Master of Forbes. Act concerning the Earl of Marischal and the Master of Forbes.
Not public and general	March 1689 c. 89 —	21 May 1689
Act in favors of the Earle of Annandale anent the horses outreicked by the fvye parishes of Eskdaill. Act in favour of the Earl of Annandale, about the horses equipped by the five parishes of Eskdale.
Montrose Act 1689 (repealed)	March 1689 c. 90 —	24 May 1689
Act concerning the late Election of Magistrates in the burgh of Montrose. Act concerning the late Election of Magistrates in the burgh of Montrose. (Repealed by Statute Law Revision (Scotland) Act 1906 (6 Edw. 7. c. 38))
Supply (No. 4) Act 1689 (repealed)	March 1689 c. 91 —	24 May 1689
Act and Warrand for a new Election of Commissioners for the shyre of Rosse. Act and Warrant for a new Election of Commissioners for the shire of Ross. (Repealed by Statute Law Revision (Scotland) Act 1906 (6 Edw. 7. c. 38))
Fencibles in Fife Act 1689 (repealed)	March 1689 c. 92 —	24 May 1689
Act in favors of some Noblemen & Gentle men for raising fencible men within the shyre of Fyfe. Act in favour of some Noblemen and Gentlemen for raising fencible men within the shire of Fife. (Repealed by Statute Law Revision (Scotland) Act 1906 (6 Edw. 7. c. 38))
Supply (No. 5) Act 1689 (repealed)	March 1689 c. 93 —	24 May 1689
Act in favors of the Commissioners of Supply of the shyre of Dumbartoun. Act in favour of the Commissioners of Supply of the shire of Dunbarton. (Repealed by Statute Law Revision (Scotland) Act 1906 (6 Edw. 7. c. 38))
Not public and general	March 1689 c. 94 —	24 May 1689
Act in favors of Mr George Bruce to remove out of the Kingdome. Act in favour of Mr George Bruce to leave the Kingdom.
Glasgow (No. 4) Act 1689 (repealed)	March 1689 c. 95 —	24 May 1689
Act in favors of the Inhabitants of the Toun of Glasgow. Act in favour of the Inhabitants of the Town of Glasgow. (Repealed by Statute Law Revision (Scotland) Act 1906 (6 Edw. 7. c. 38))
Payment of Forces Act 1689 (repealed)	Vol. IX, p. 92; 1689 c. 37	24 May 1689
Warrand to duke Hamilton to draw precepts for paying the forces. Warrant to duke of Hamilton to draw precepts for paying the forces. (Repealed by Statute Law Revision (Scotland) Act 1906 (6 Edw. 7. c. 38))
Not public and general	March 1689 c. 96 —	24 May 1689
Act in favors of Captain Alexander Straiton & others. Act in favour of Captain Alexander Straiton and others.
Adjournment (No. 2) Act 1689 (repealed)	March 1689 c. 97; 1689 c. 40	24 May 1689
Act Adjourning the Meeting of the Estates to the fyfth of June. Act adjourning the meeting of the estates to the fifth of June. (Repealed by Statute Law Revision (Scotland) Act 1906 (6 Edw. 7. c. 38))

=== July ===
The 1st session of the parliament of William and Mary, held in Edinburgh from 5 June 1689 until 2 August 1689.

Short title, or popular name	Citation	Royal assent
Long title
Declaration as to Meeting of Estates Act 1689 (repealed)	July 1689 c. 1 (Note: This is the citation in the Record Edition.); 1689 c. 1 (Note: This is the citation in the Duodecimal Edition.)	5 June 1689
Act declaring the Meeting of the Estates to be a Parliament. Act declaring the Meeting of the Estates to be a Parliament. (Repealed by Statute Law Revision (Scotland) Act 1906 (6 Edw. 7. c. 38))
Oath of Allegiance Act 1689 (repealed)	July 1689 c. 2; 1689 c. 2	17 June 1689
Act Recognizing their Majesties Royall Authoritie and for taking the Oath of Alledgeance. Act Recognizing their Majesties' Royal Authority and for taking the Oath of Allegiance. (Repealed by Statute Law Revision (Scotland) Act 1906 (6 Edw. 7. c. 38))
Attendance of Absent Members (No. 2) Act 1689 (repealed)	July 1689 c. 3 — (Note: This act is not listed in the Duodecimal Edition.)	21 June 1689
Proclamation requyring the absent members to attend the Parliament. Proclamation requiring the absent members to attend the Parliament. (Repealed by Statute Law Revision (Scotland) Act 1906 (6 Edw. 7. c. 38))
Prelacy Act 1689 still in force	July 1689 c. 4; 1689 c. 3	22 July 1689
Act abolishing Prelacie. Act abolishing Prelacy.
Army Act 1689 (repealed)	July 1689 c. 5	21 July 1689
Act for furnishing Baggage horses to the Army. Act for furnishing Baggage horses to the Army. (Repealed by Statute Law Revision (Scotland) Act 1906 (6 Edw. 7. c. 38))
Not public and general	July 1689 c. 6 —	31 July 1689
Act in favours of Andrew Fletcher of Saltoun. Act in favour of Andrew Fletcher of Saltoun.
Defence of the Realm (No. 2) Act 1689 (repealed)	July 1689 c. 7 —	1 August 1689
Act authorizing the Councill to call out the Heretors and fensible men. Act authorising the council to call out the heritors and fencible men. (Repealed by Statute Law Revision (Scotland) Act 1906 (6 Edw. 7. c. 38))
Not public and general	July 1689 c. 8; 1689 c. 4	1 August 1689
Act Rescinding the forfaultor of the late Earle of Argyle. Act rescinding the forfeiture of the late Earl of Argyll.
Saving the Rights Act 1689 Not public and general	July 1689 c. 9; 1689 c. 5	2 August 1689
Act Salvo Jure Cujuslibet. Act Salvo Jure Cujuslibet.
Adjournment (No. 3) Act 1689 (repealed)	Vol. IX, p. 100; 1689 c. 6	2 August 1689
Act of adjournment. Act of adjournment. (Repealed by Statute Law Revision (Scotland) Act 1906 (6 Edw. 7. c. 38))

=== Sources ===
- Alexander, William (1841). "Acta Parliamentorum Gulielmi et Mariæ". An Abridgement of the Acts of the Parliaments of Scotland. Edinburgh: Adam and Charles Black. pp. A75 – A77 – via Google Books.
- Alexander, William (1841). "Acta Parliamentorum Gulielmi et Mariæ". An Abridgement of the Acts of the Parliaments of Scotland. Edinburgh: Adam and Charles Black. pp. A75 – A77 – via Google Books.
- Chronological Table of the Statutes. London: Her Majesty's Stationery Office. 1972. pp. 1359–1360 – via Google Books.
- "Acts of the Old Scottish Parliament: 1689". legislation.gov.uk. The National Archives.
- "Index of Statutes: Index of Statutes: William II and Mary II (1689-1694)". Records of the Parliaments of Scotland to 1707. University of St Andrews.

== See also ==
- List of legislation in the United Kingdom
- Records of the Parliaments of Scotland
