= Crown and Parliament Recognition Act 1689 =

Act of the Parliament of England

Crown and Parliament Recognition Act 1689 (Note: The citation of this act by this short title was authorised by section 5 of, and the second schedule to, the Statute Law Revision Act 1948. Due to the repeal of those provisions, it is now authorised by section 19(2) of the Interpretation Act 1978.)
- Act of Parliament
- Parliament of England
- Long title: An Act for Recognizing King William and Queene Mary and for avoiding all Questions touching the Acts made in the Parliament assembled at Westminster the thirteenth day of February one thousand six hundred and eighty eight. (Note: These words are printed against this act in the second column of the second schedule to the Statute Law Revision Act 1948, which is headed "Title".)
- Citation: 2 Will. & Mar. c. 1
- Territorial extent: England and Wales

Dates
- Royal assent: 14 April 1690
- Commencement: 20 March 1690 (Note: Start of session.)
Other legislation
Amends	Bill of Rights 1689
Relates to	Parliament Act 1660; Bill of Rights 1689; Crown Recognition Act (Ireland) 1692; Act of Settlement 1701; Treason Act 1702

Status: Current legislation

Text of statute as originally enacted

Revised text of statute as amended

Text of the Crown and Parliament Recognition Act 1689 as in force today (including any amendments) within the United Kingdom, from legislation.gov.uk.

The Crown and Parliament Recognition Act 1689 (2 Will. & Mar. c. 1) is an act of the Parliament of England, passed in April 1690 but backdated to the start of the parliamentary session, which started on 20 March 1690. (Note: 1689 in Old Style dates.) It was designed to confirm the succession to the throne of King William III and Queen Mary II of England and to confirm the validity of the laws passed by the Convention Parliament which had been irregularly convened following the Glorious Revolution and the end of James II's reign.

As of 2026, the act is still wholly in force in England and Wales.

== Background ==
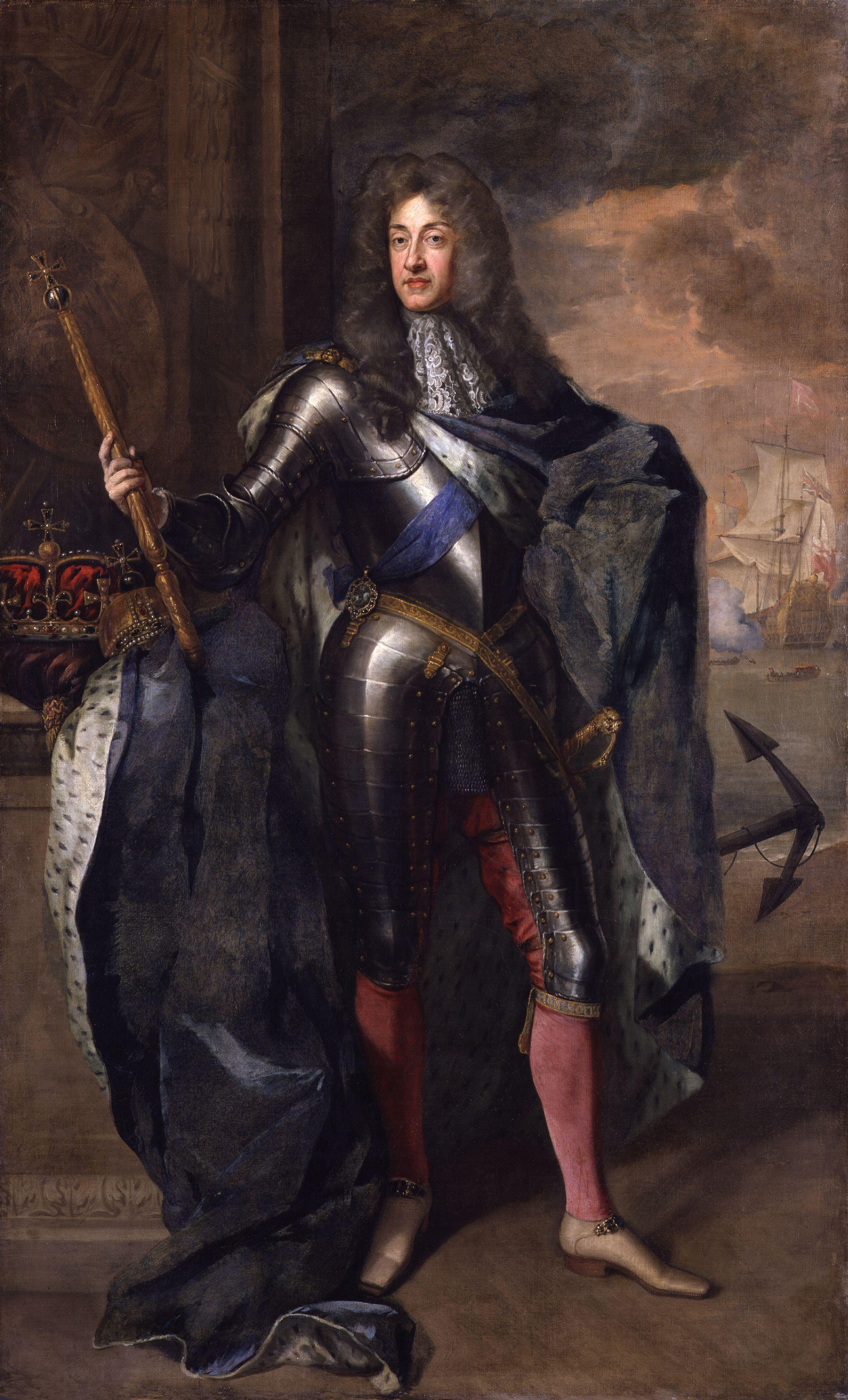
James II

William III

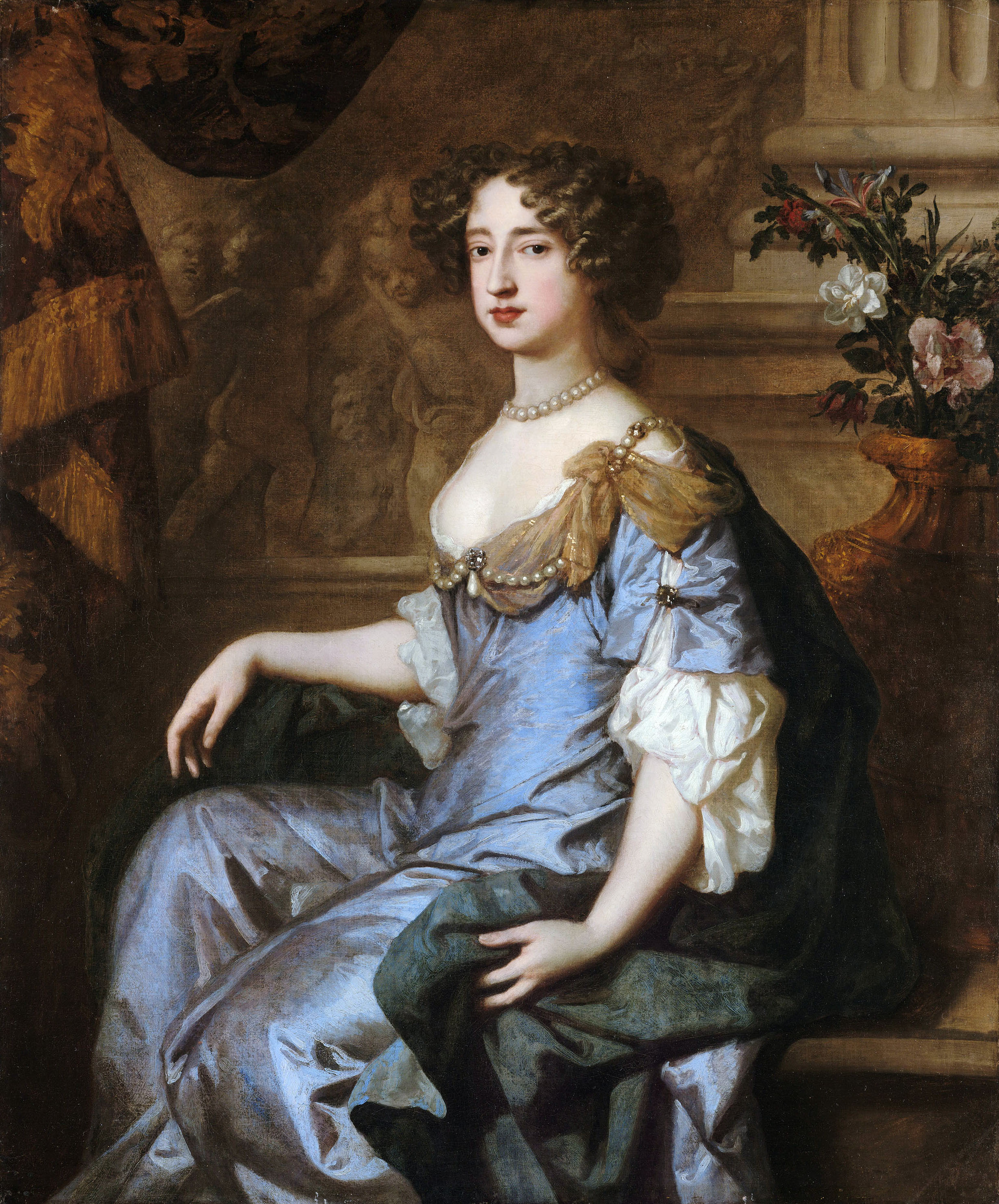
Mary II

The act was passed because in 1688 King James II of England was deposed (he was deemed to have abdicated) and replaced as monarch by William and Mary, who ruled jointly. However this could not be achieved without an act of Parliament to approve it. Since no parliament was in existence at the time, it was necessary to convene one, but under the traditional constitution only the monarch could summon a parliament. In the absence of a monarch to do so, the members of the previous parliament convened a new one themselves, without a royal summons, instead asking William to issue the summons, which he did on 22 January 1689. This irregular Parliament sat on 13 February. They declared James to have abdicated, and then chose Mary (his daughter) and William (her husband and first cousin) to succeed him, and passed the Bill of Rights 1689 to make it legal. (In Scotland a separate act was passed, the Claim of Right, which stated that James had forfeited the throne by his illegal actions and his failure to take the coronation oath.)

However, doubts arose as to the validity of the Bill of Rights and the other acts passed by the Convention Parliament. Since the Parliament had not been summoned in the regular way, it was arguable that it was no parliament at all and its legislation was of no legal effect (although this occurrence was not unprecedented in English history). Therefore after the Convention Parliament was dissolved and the next parliament was summoned by the King and Queen in the normal manner, the act was passed to confirm the validity of the royal succession and the previous parliament's legislative competence.

== Controversy ==
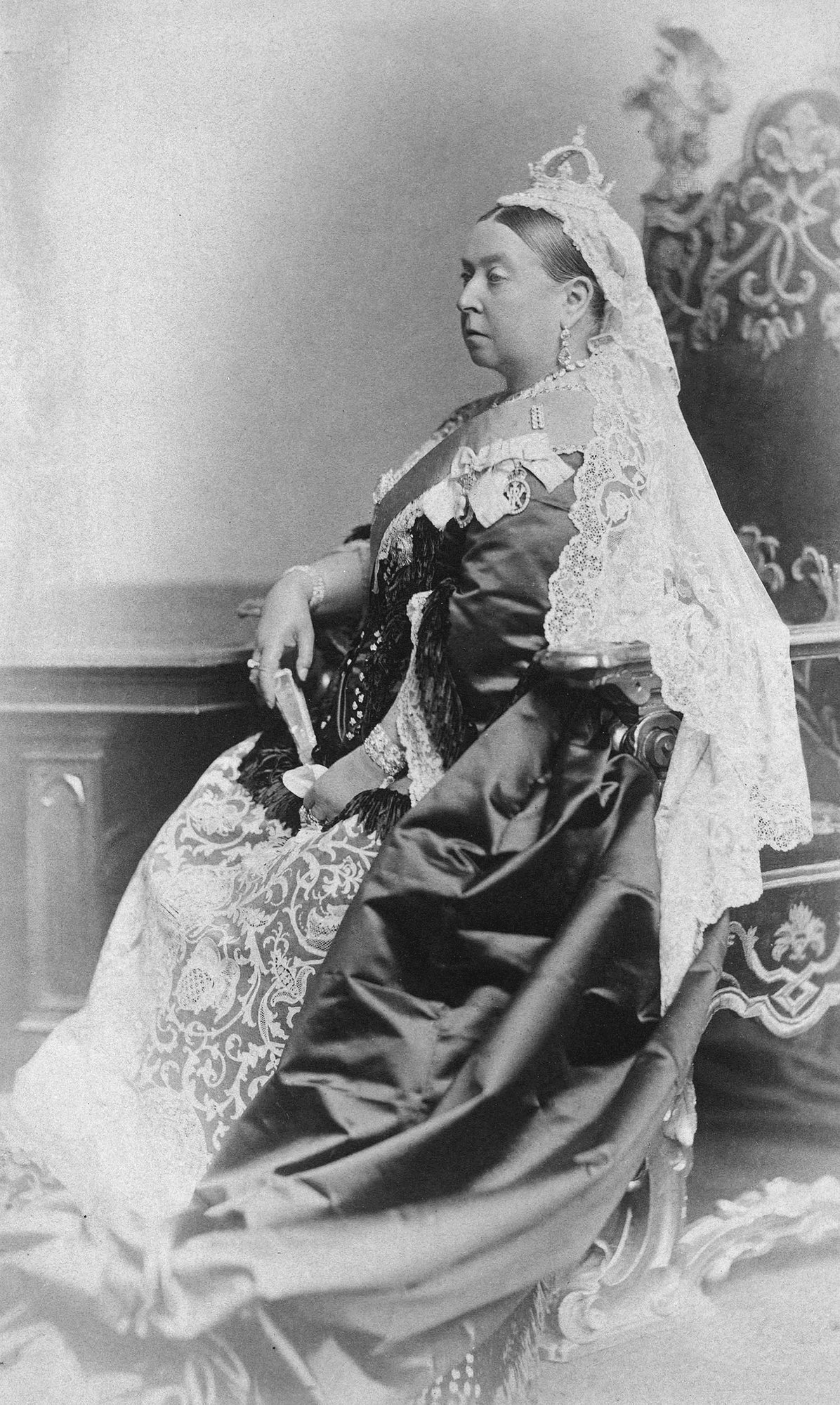
Queen Victoria

The difficulty with the act is that if the Convention Parliament had no authority, then the succession of William and Mary was of no legal effect, which meant that they were not empowered to give royal assent to any bill in the next parliament, with the result that even the act was of no effect either. This very point was argued before the Hereford County Court in 1944 by a litigant who represented himself in a probate case called Hall v. Hall. He argued that the Court of Probate Act 1857 (20 & 21 Vict. c. 77) (which undermined his case) was of no legal effect whatsoever, since it had never received royal assent. It had received royal assent from Queen Victoria, but according to his argument Victoria had never legally inherited the throne, because the Bill of Rights and the Act of Settlement 1701 (12 & 13 Will. 3. c. 2) (which also altered the line of succession to the throne) were of no effect, since both had been assented to by William III, who was not the real king. Therefore Victoria had never been the real queen and so the Probate Act (like every other act passed since 1689) was not the law. Predictably, the judge ruled against him, and the point has never been argued in court since.

Although the judge did not give detailed reasons for his decision, a counterpoint to the above argument has been advanced by academics: "One possible answer, deducible from rationalizations of later medieval practice when usurpations of the throne were not uncommon, is that ... [a]s a matter of State necessity ... a de facto King had been regarded as competent to summon a lawful Parliament."

== Text ==
An Act for Recognizing King William and Queene Mary and for avoiding all Questions touching the Acts made in the Parliament assembled at Westminster the thirteenth day of February one thousand six hundred eighty eight.

Wee your Majestyes most humble and loyall subjects the lords spirituall and temporall and commons in this present Parlyament assembled doe beseech your most excellent Majestyes that it may be published and declared in this High Court of Parlyament and enacted by authoritie of the same that we doe recognize and acknowledge your Majestyes were are and of right ought to be [by] the laws of this realme our soveraigne liege lord and lady King and Queene of England France and Ireland and the dominions thereunto belonging in and to whose princely persons the royall state crowne and dignity of the said realms with all honours stiles regalities prerogatives powers jurisdictions and authorities to the same belonging and appertaining are most fully rightfully and intirely invested and incorporated united and annexed. And for the avoiding of all disputes and questions concerning the being and authority of the late Parliament assembled at Westminster the thirteenth day of February one thousand six hundred eighty eight wee doe most humbly beseech your Majestyes that it may be enacted and bee it enacted by the King and Queenes most excellent Majestyes by and with the advice and consent of the lords spirituall and temporall and commons in this present Parlyament assembled and by authoritie of the same that all and singular the Acts made and enacted in the said Parlyament were and are laws and statutes of this kingdome and as such ought to be reputed taken and obeyed by all the people of this kingdome.

== Ireland ==
Crown Recognition Act (Ireland) 1692
- Act of Parliament
- Parliament of Ireland
- Long title: An Act of Recognition, of their Majesties undoubted Right to the Crown of Ireland.
- Citation: 4 Will. & Mar. c. 1 (I)
- Territorial extent: Ireland

Dates
- Royal assent: 3 November 1692
- Commencement: 3 November 1692
- Repealed: Republic of Ireland: 24 November 1962
Other legislation
Repealed by	Republic of Ireland: Statute Law Revision (Pre-Union Irish Statutes) Act 1962
Relates to	Crown and Parliament Recognition Act 1689; Act of Settlement 1701

Status
- Republic of Ireland: Repealed
- Northern Ireland: Current legislation

Text of statute as originally enacted

Revised text of statute as amended

In the Kingdom of Ireland another act, the Crown Recognition Act (Ireland) 1692 ([4 Will. & Mar., long title An Act of Recognition, of their Majesties undoubted Right to the Crown of Ireland), was an act of the Parliament of Ireland, which made similar provision. In the Republic of Ireland this was repealed by section 1 of, and the Schedule to, the Statute Law Revision (Pre-Union Irish Statutes) Act 1962.

== See also ==
- Treason Act 1702
- Parliament Act 1660
