= City of London Sewerage Act 1771 =

Act of the Parliament of Great Britain

- Act of Parliament
- Parliament of Great Britain
- Long title: An Act for consolidating, extending, and rendering more effectual, the Powers granted by several Acts of Parliament for making, enlarging, amending, and cleansing, the Vaults, Drains, and Sewers, within the City of London and Liberties thereof, and for paving, cleansing, and lighting, the Streets, Lanes, Squares, Yards, Courts, Alleys, Passages, and Places, and preventing and removing Obstructions and Annoyances within the same.
- Citation: 11 Geo. 3. c. 29
- Territorial extent: Great Britain

Dates
- Royal assent: 29 April 1771
- Commencement: 13 November 1770 (Note: Start of session.)
- Repealed: 8 August 1851
Other legislation
Amends	See § Repealed enactments
Repeals/revokes	See § Repealed enactments
Repealed by	City of London Sewers Act 1851

Status: Repealed

Text of statute as originally enacted

The City of London Sewerage Act 1771 (11 Geo. 3. c. 29) was an act of the Parliament of Great Britain that consolidated enactments related to sewerage in the City of London.

== Provisions ==
=== Repealed enactments ===
Section 119 of the act repealed the Paving, etc., of London Act 1768 (8 Geo. 3. c. 21).

Section 122 of the act repealed 7 enactments, "as relates to the public sewers, drains, vaults or pavements of the city and liberties".

Citation	Short Title	Extent of repeal
18 & 19 Cha. 2. c. 8 (Note: This is the citation in The Statutes of the Realm)	Rebuilding of London Act 1666	As relates to the public sewers, drains, vaults or pavements of the city and liberties.
22 & 23 Cha. 2. c. 17	London Streets, Paving, Cleansing, etc. Act 1670	As relates to the public sewers, drains, vaults or pavements of the city and liberties.
2 Will. & Mar. c. 8	London, Quo Warranto Judgment Reversed Act 1689	As relates to the public sewers, drains, vaults or pavements of the city and liberties.
10 Geo. 2. c. 22	Watching (City of London) Act 1736	As relates to the public sewers, drains, vaults or pavements of the city and liberties.
17 Geo. 2. c. 29	London Street Lighting Act 1743	As relates to the public sewers, drains, vaults or pavements of the city and liberties.. (Note: The act was already repealed by the Paving, etc., of London Act 1768 (8 Geo. 3. c. 21))
33 Geo. 2. c. 30	London Streets, City Act 1759	As relates to the public sewers, drains, vaults or pavements of the city and liberties.
6 Geo. 3. c. c. 26	London Paving and Lighting Act 1766	As relates to the public sewers, drains, vaults or pavements of the city and liberties.

== Subsequent developments ==
The whole act was repealed by section 45 of the City of London Sewers Act 1851 (14 & 15 Vict. c. xci), which came into force on 8 August 1851.
