= Bill of Rights 1689 =

English civil rights legislation

The Bill of Rights (Note: The act is cited as "The Bill of Rights" in the United Kingdom, without a year, as authorised by section 1 of, and the first schedule to, the Short Titles Act 1896. Owing to the repeal of those provisions, it is now authorised by section 19(2) of the Interpretation Act 1978. In the Republic of Ireland, it is cited as "The Bill of Rights 1688", as authorised by section 1 of, and the first schedule to, the Short Titles Act 1896 (as amended by section 5(a) of the Statute Law Revision Act 2007). The short title of this Act was previously "The Bill of Rights".)
- Act of Parliament
- Parliament of England
- Long title: An Act Declaring the Rights and Liberties of the Subject and Settling the Succession of the Crown.
- Citation: 1 Will. & Mar. Sess. 2. c. 2
- Territorial extent: England and Wales; Ireland

Dates
- Royal assent: 16 December 1689
- Commencement: 13 February 1689 (Note: The Bill of Rights was passed in December 1689, so most sources refer to it by the year 1689. However, all Acts of Parliament prior to 1793 were ex post facto laws that came into effect on the first day of the session. The Convention Parliament (1689) met on 22 January and became a formal Parliament on 13 February. However, the year 1689 did not begin until 25 March 1689 (Old Style). Therefore, the Bill of Rights is officially dated 1688.)
Other legislation
| Amended by | Crown and Parliament Recognition Act 1689; Juries Act 1825; Statute Law Revision Act 1867; Statute Law Revision Act 1888; Short Titles Act 1896; Accession Declaration Act 1910; Statute Law Revision Act 1948; Statute Law Revision Act 1950; Succession to the Crown Act 2013 |
| Relates to | Absence of King William Act 1689 |

Status: Amended

Text of statute as originally enacted

Text of the Bill of Rights as in force today (including any amendments) within the United Kingdom, from legislation.gov.uk.

The Bill of Rights
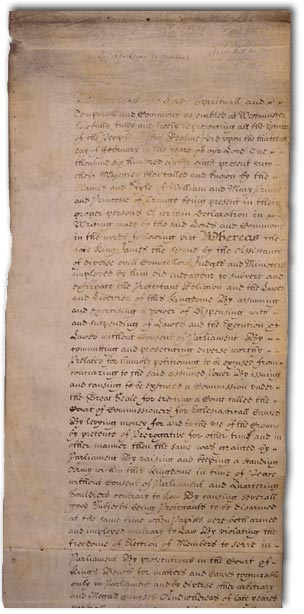
- Created: 1689
- Location: Parliamentary Archives
- Author: Parliament of England
- Purpose: Assert the rights of Parliament and the individual, and ensure a Protestant political supremacy

Full text
- Bill of Rights 1689 at Wikisource

The Bill of Rights 1689 (1 Will. & Mar. Sess. 2. c. 2) (sometimes known as the Bill of Rights 1688) is an act of the Parliament of England that set out certain basic civil rights and changed the succession to the English Crown. It remains a crucial statute in English constitutional law.

Largely based on the ideas of political theorist John Locke, the Bill sets out a constitutional requirement for the Crown to seek the consent of the people as represented in Parliament. As well as setting limits on the powers of the monarch, it established the rights of Parliament, including regular parliaments, free elections, and parliamentary privilege. It also listed individual rights, including the prohibition of cruel and unusual punishment and the right not to pay taxes levied without the approval of Parliament. Finally, it described and condemned several misdeeds of James II of England. The Bill of Rights received royal assent on 16 December 1689. It is a restatement in statutory form of the Declaration of Right presented by the Convention Parliament to William III and Mary II in February 1689, inviting them to become joint sovereigns of England, displacing James II, who was stated to have abdicated and left the throne vacant.

In the United Kingdom, the Bill is considered a basic document of the uncodified British constitution, along with Magna Carta, the Petition of Right, the Habeas Corpus Act 1679 and the Parliament Acts 1911 and 1949. A separate but similar document, the Claim of Right Act 1689, applies in Scotland. The Bill was one of the models used to draft the United States Bill of Rights, the United Nations Declaration of Human Rights and the European Convention on Human Rights. Along with the Act of Settlement 1701, it remains in effect within all Commonwealth realms, as amended by the Perth Agreement.

== Background ==
During the 17th century, there was renewed interest in Magna Carta. The Parliament of England passed the Petition of Right in 1628 which established certain liberties for subjects. The English Civil War (1642–1651) was fought between the King and an oligarchic but elected Parliament, during which the notion of long-term political parties took form with the New Model Army Grandees and humble, leveller-influenced figures debating a new constitution in the Putney Debates of 1647. Parliament was largely cowed by the executive during the Protectorate (1653–1659) and most of the twenty-five years of Charles II's English Restoration from 1660. However, with the advantage of the growth in printed pamphlets and support of the City of London, it was able to temper some of the executive excess, intrigue and largesse of the government, especially the Cabal ministry who signed a Secret Treaty of Dover that allied England to France in a prospective war against oft-allies the Dutch Republic. It had already passed the Habeas Corpus Act 1679, which strengthened the convention that forbade detention lacking sufficient cause or evidence.

=== Glorious Revolution ===
Objecting to the policies of King James II of England (James VII of Scotland and James II of Ireland), a group of English Parliamentarians invited the Dutch stadtholder William III of Orange-Nassau (William of Orange) to overthrow the King. William's successful invasion with a Dutch fleet and army led to James' fleeing to France. In December 1688, peers of the realm appointed William as provisional governor. It was widely acknowledged that such action was constitutional if the monarch were incapacitated. The peers summoned an assembly of many members of parliament. This assembly called for an English Convention Parliament to be elected, which convened on 22 January 1689.

=== Declaration of Right ===
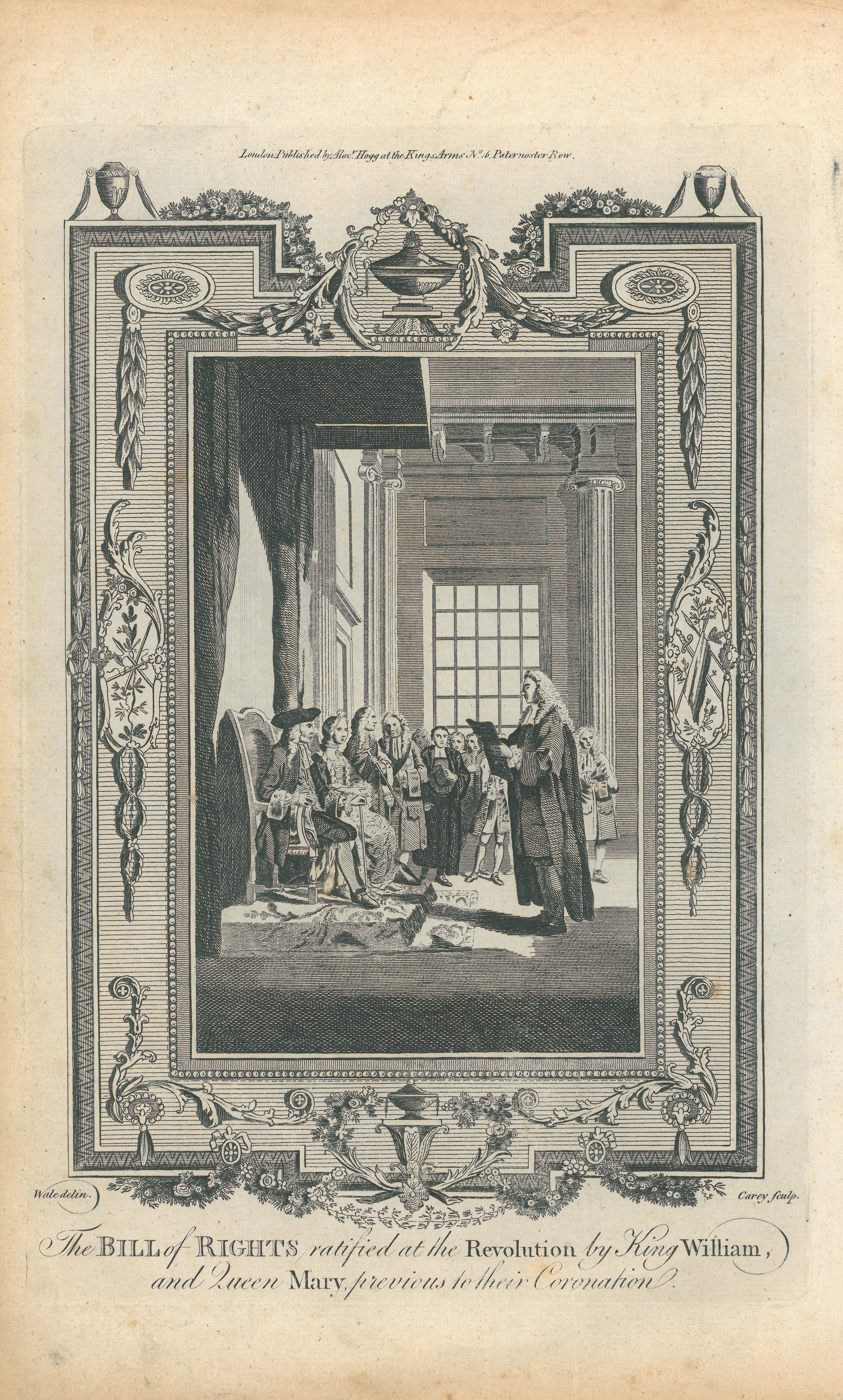
An 18th-century engraving, based on a drawing by Samuel Wale, of the Bill of Rights being presented to William III and Mary II

The proposal to draw up a statement of rights and liberties and James's violation of them was first made on 29 January 1689 in the House of Commons, with members arguing that the House "cannot answer it to the nation or Prince of Orange till we declare what are the rights invaded" and that William "cannot take it ill if we make conditions to secure ourselves for the future" in order to "do justice to those who sent us hither". On 2 February a committee specially convened reported to the Commons 23 Heads of Grievances, which the Commons approved and added some of their own. However, on 4 February the Commons decided to instruct the committee to differentiate between "such of the general heads, as are introductory of new laws, from those that are declaratory of ancient rights". On 7 February the Commons approved this revised Declaration of Right, and on 8 February instructed the committee to put into a single text the Declaration (with the heads which were "introductory of new laws" removed), the resolution of 29 January and the Lords' proposal for a revised oath of allegiance. It passed the Commons without division.

On 13 February the clerk of the House of Lords read the Declaration of Right, and the Marquess of Halifax, in the name of all the estates of the realm, asked William and Mary to accept the throne. William replied for his wife and himself: "We thankfully accept what you have offered us". They then went in procession to the Great Gate at Whitehall. In a ceremony in the Banqueting House, Garter King of Arms proclaimed them King and Queen of England, France, and Ireland, whereupon they adjourned to the Chapel Royal, with the Bishop of London preaching the sermon. They were crowned on 11 April, swearing an oath to uphold the laws made by Parliament. The Coronation Oath Act 1688 had provided a new coronation oath, whereby the monarchs were to "solemnly promise and swear to govern the people of this kingdom of England, and the dominions thereunto belonging, according to the statutes in parliament agreed on, and the laws and customs of the same". They were also to maintain the laws of God, the true profession of the Gospel, and the Protestant Reformed faith established by law. This replaced an oath which had deferred more to the monarch. The previous oath required the monarch to rule based on "the laws and customs ... granted by the Kings of England".

== The Act ==
The Declaration of Right was enacted in an Act of Parliament, the Bill of Rights 1689, which received royal assent in December 1689.

The Act asserted "certain ancient rights and liberties" by declaring that:

- the pretended power of suspending the laws and dispensing with (i.e. ignoring) laws by regal authority without consent of Parliament is illegal;
- the commission for ecclesiastical causes is illegal;
- levying taxes without grant of Parliament is illegal;
- it is the right of the subjects to petition the king, and prosecutions for such petitioning are illegal;
- keeping a standing army in time of peace, unless it be with consent of Parliament, is against law;
- Protestants may have arms for their defence suitable to their conditions and as allowed by law;
- election of members of Parliament ought to be free;
- the freedom of speech and debates or proceedings in Parliament ought not to be impeached or questioned in any court or place out of Parliament;
- excessive bail ought not to be required, nor excessive fines imposed, nor cruel and unusual punishments inflicted;
- jurors in trials for high treason ought to be freeholders;
- promises of fines and forfeitures before conviction are illegal and void;
- for redress of all grievances, and for the amending, strengthening and preserving of the laws, Parliaments ought to be held frequently.

The Act declared James's flight from England following the Glorious Revolution to be an abdication of the throne. It listed twelve of James's policies by which James designed to "endeavour to subvert and extirpate the protestant religion, and the laws and liberties of this kingdom". These were:

- by assuming and exercising a power of dispensing with and suspending of laws and the execution of laws without consent of Parliament;
- by prosecuting the Seven Bishops;
- by establishing the court of commissioners for ecclesiastical causes;
- by levying taxes for the use of the Crown by pretence of prerogative as if the same was granted by Parliament;
- by raising and keeping a standing army within this kingdom in time of peace without consent of Parliament;
- by causing Protestants to be disarmed at the same time when papists were both armed and employed contrary to law;
- by violating the freedom of election of members to serve in Parliament;
- by prosecutions in the Court of King's Bench for matters and causes cognisable only in Parliament, and by divers (diverse) other arbitrary and illegal courses;
- by employing unqualified persons on juries in trials, and jurors in trials for high treason which were not freeholders;
- by imposing excessive bail on persons committed in criminal cases against the laws made for the liberty of the subjects;
- by imposing excessive fines and illegal and cruel punishments;
- by making several grants and promises made of fines and forfeitures before any conviction or judgment against the persons upon whom the same were to be levied;

all of which were declared to be utterly and directly contrary to the known laws and statutes and freedom of the realm.

In a prelude to the Act of Settlement to come twelve years later, the Bill of Rights barred Roman Catholics from the throne of England as "it hath been found by experience that it is inconsistent with the safety and welfare of this Protestant kingdom to be governed by a papist prince"; thus William III and Mary II were named as the successors of James II and that the throne would pass from them first to Mary's heirs, then to her sister, Princess Anne of Denmark and her heirs (and, thereafter, to any heirs of William by a later marriage).

== Amendments and legacy ==
The Bill of Rights was later supplemented by the Act of Settlement 1701, which was agreed to by the Parliament of Scotland as part of the Treaty of Union. The Act of Settlement altered the line of succession to the throne laid out in the Bill of Rights. However, both the Bill of Rights and the Claim of Right contributed a great deal to the establishment of the concept of parliamentary sovereignty and the curtailment of the powers of the monarch. These have been held to have established the constitutional monarchy, and, along with the penal laws, settled much of the political and religious turmoil that had convulsed Scotland, England and Ireland in the 17th century.

The act reinforced the Petition of Right and the Habeas Corpus Act 1679 by codifying certain rights and liberties. Described by William Blackstone as Fundamental Laws of England, the rights expressed in these Acts became associated with the idea of the rights of Englishmen. The Bill of Rights directly influenced the 1776 Virginia Declaration of Rights, (Note: Section Seven of the Virginia Declaration of Rights reads, That all power of suspending laws, or the execution of laws, by any authority, without consent of the representatives of the people, is injurious to their rights and ought not to be exercised. which strongly echoes the first two "ancient rights and liberties" asserted in the Bill of Rights 1689: That the pretended power of suspending the laws or the execution of laws by regal authority without consent of Parliament is illegal; That the pretended power of dispensing with laws or the execution of laws by regal authority, as it hath been assumed and exercised of late, is illegal; And the Virginia Declaration's Section Nine, That excessive bail ought not to be required, nor excessive fines imposed, nor cruel and unusual punishments inflicted. is borrowed word for word from the Bill of Rights 1689.) which in turn influenced the Declaration of Independence.

Although not a comprehensive statement of civil and political liberties, the Bill of Rights stands as one of the landmark documents in the development of civil liberties in the United Kingdom and a model for later, more general, statements of rights; these include the United States Bill of Rights, the French Declaration of the Rights of Man and of the Citizen, the United Nations Universal Declaration of Human Rights, and the European Convention on Human Rights. For example, as with the Bill of Rights 1689, the US Constitution prohibits excessive bail and "cruel and unusual punishment"; in fact, the Eighth Amendment to the United States Constitution which imposes this prohibition is a near-verbatim reproduction of the corresponding article in the Bill of Rights 1689. Similarly, "cruel, inhuman or degrading treatment or punishment" is banned under Article 5 of the Universal Declaration of Human Rights and Article 3 of the European Convention on Human Rights.

== Current legal status ==
The Bill of Rights remains in statute and continues to be cited in legal proceedings in the United Kingdom and other Commonwealth realms, particularly Article 9 on parliamentary freedom of speech. Following the Perth Agreement in 2011, legislation amending the Bill of Rights and the Act of Settlement 1701 came into effect across the Commonwealth realms on 26 March 2015 which changed the laws of succession to the British throne.

=== Australia ===
The Bill of Rights 1689 remains a part of Australian law, however in some states the Bill has been re-enacted in local legislation.

The ninth article, regarding parliamentary freedom of speech, was inherited by Federal Parliament in 1901 under section 49 of the Australian Constitution. It was incorporated into the Parliamentary Privileges Act 1987 which "preserves the application of the traditional expression of this privilege, but spells out in some detail just what may be covered by the term 'proceedings in Parliament'".

=== Canada ===
In Canada, the Bill of Rights remains in statute, although it has been largely superseded by domestic constitutional legislation. The ninth article on parliamentary freedom of speech remains in active use.

=== Ireland ===
The application of the Bill of Rights to the Kingdom of Ireland was uncertain. While the English Parliament sometimes passed acts relating to Ireland, the Irish Patriot Party regarded this as illegitimate, and others felt that English acts only extended to Ireland when explicitly stated to do so, which was not the case for the Bill of Rights. The Crown of Ireland Act 1542 meant the Bill's changes to the royal succession extended to Ireland. Bills modelled on the Bill of Rights were introduced in the Parliament of Ireland in 1695 and 1697 but not enacted. After the Acts of Union 1800, provisions relating to the rights of Parliament implicitly extended to Ireland, but provisions relating to the rights of the individual were a grey area. Some jurists regarded the bill not as positive law but as declaratory of the common law, and as such applicable to Ireland.

The Constitution of the Irish Free State, and the subsequent Constitution of Ireland, carry over laws in force in the former United Kingdom of Great Britain and Ireland to the extent they were not repugnant to those constitutions. The Bill of Rights was not referred to in subsequent Irish legislation until the Statute Law Revision Act 2007, which retained it, changed its short title to "Bill of Rights 1688" and repealed most of section 1 (the preamble) as being religiously discriminatory, which included: all words down to "Upon which Letters Elections having been accordingly made"; Article 7, which allowed Protestants to bear arms; and all words from "And they doe Claime Demand and Insist".

The Houses of the Oireachtas (Inquiries, Privileges and Procedures) Act 2013 repealed Article 9 on "freedom of speech and debates or proceedings in Parliament" as part of a consolidation of the law on parliamentary privilege.

=== New Zealand ===
The Bill of Rights is part of the laws of New Zealand. The Act was invoked in the 1976 case of Fitzgerald v Muldoon and Others, which centred on the purporting of newly appointed Prime Minister Robert Muldoon that he would advise the Governor-General to abolish a superannuation scheme established by the New Zealand Superannuation Act 1974, without new legislation. Muldoon felt that the dissolution would be immediate and he would later introduce a bill in parliament to retroactively make the abolition legal. This claim was challenged in court and the Chief Justice declared that Muldoon's actions were illegal as they had violated Article 1 of the Bill of Rights, which provides "that the pretended power of dispensing with laws or the execution of laws by regal authority ... is illegal."

=== United Kingdom ===
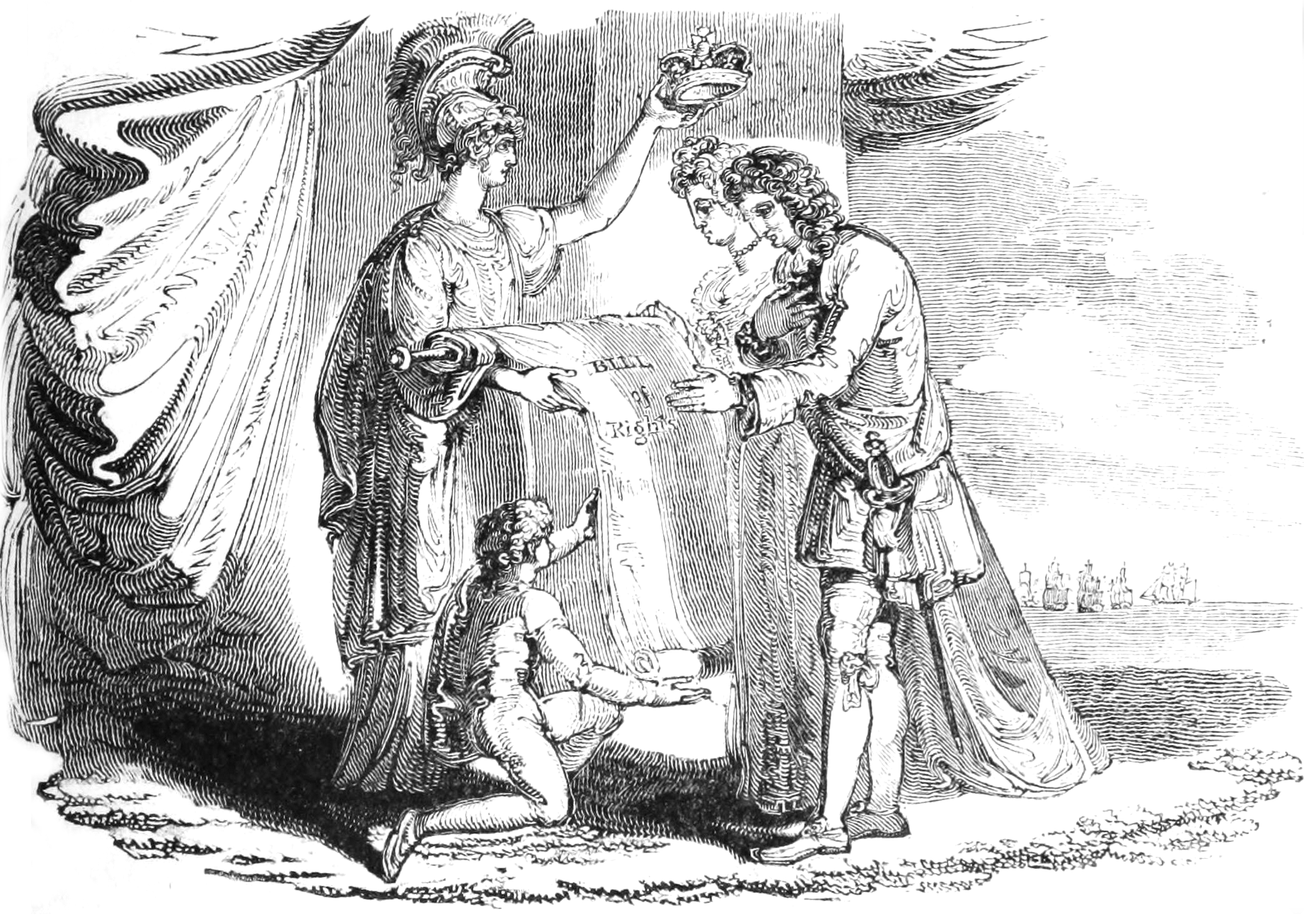
Allegory of the Bill of Rights, with Britannia presenting the Bill to William and Mary

The Bill of Rights applies in England and Wales; it was enacted in the Kingdom of England which at the time included Wales. Scotland has its own legislation, the Claim of Right Act 1689, passed before the Acts of Union between England and Scotland. There are doubts as to whether, or to what extent, the Bill of Rights applies in Northern Ireland, reflecting earlier doubts as regards Ireland. (Note: The United Kingdom consists of four countries and three distinct legal systems: England and Wales, Scotland and Northern Ireland. These jurisdictions have particular legal considerations of their own, arising from differences in English law, Scots law and Northern Ireland law.)

Section 3 of the act was repealed by section 1 of, and the schedule to, the Statute Law Revision Act 1867 (30 & 31 Vict. c. 59), which came into force on 15 July 1867.

The requirement that jurors be freeholders in cases of high treason was abolished in England and Wales by the Juries Act 1825, and in Northern Ireland (to the extent it applied) by the Statute Law Revision Act 1950.

Natural justice, the right to a fair trial, is in constitutional law held to temper unfair exploitation of parliamentary privilege. On 21 July 1995 a libel case, Neil Hamilton, MP v The Guardian, collapsed as the High Court ruled that the Bill of Rights' total bar on bringing into question anything said or done in the House prevented The Guardian from obtaining a fair hearing. Hamilton could otherwise have carte blanche to allege any background or meaning to his words, and no contradicting direct evidence, inference, extra submission or cross-examination of his words could take place due to the tight strictures of the Bill of Rights. Equally, the House of Lords decided that, absent a 1996 statutory provision, the Bill of Rights' entrenched parliamentary privilege would have prevented a fair trial for Hamilton in the 2001 defamation action of Hamilton v Al-Fayed which went through the two tiers of appeal to like effect. That provision was section 13 of the Defamation Act 1996, which permits MPs to waive their parliamentary privilege and thus cite and have examined their own speeches if relevant to litigation.

Following the United Kingdom European Union membership referendum in 2016, the Bill of Rights was cited by the Supreme Court in the Miller case, in which the court ruled that triggering EU exit must first be authorised by an act of Parliament, because not doing so would abrogate rights secured by an Act of Parliament (namely, rights of EU citizens arising from the EU treaties given effect in UK law by the European Communities Act 1972, as amended). It was cited again by the Supreme Court in its 2019 ruling that the prorogation of parliament was unlawful. The Court disagreed with the Government's assertion that prorogation could not be questioned under the Bill of Rights 1689 as a "proceeding of Parliament"; it ruled the opposite assertion, that prorogation "cannot sensibly be described as a 'proceeding in Parliament'", as it was imposed upon and not debatable by Parliament, and could bring "core or essential business of Parliament" to an end without debate.

== Recognition ==
Two special designs of commemorative two pound coins were issued in the United Kingdom in 1989 to celebrate the tercentenary of the Glorious Revolution. One referred to the Bill of Rights and the other to the Claim of Right. Both depict the Royal Cypher of William and Mary and the mace of the House of Commons, one also shows a representation of the St Edward's Crown and the other the Crown of Scotland.

In May 2011, the Bill of Rights was inscribed in UNESCO's UK Memory of the World Register recognising that:

All the main principles of the Bill of Rights are still in force today, and the Bill of Rights continues to be cited in legal cases in the UK and in Commonwealth countries. It has a primary place in a wider national historical narrative of documents which established the rights of Parliament and set out universal civil liberties, starting with Magna Carta in 1215. It also has international significance, as it was a model for the US Bill of Rights 1789, and its influence can be seen in other documents which establish rights of human beings, such as the Declaration of the Rights of Man, the United Nations Declaration of Human Rights and the European Convention on Human Rights.

As part of the Parliament in the Making programme, the Bill of Rights was on display at the Houses of Parliament in February 2015 and at the British Library from March to September 2015.

== Subsequent developments ==
In the preamble to the act, the words " and jurors which passe upon men in trialls for high treason ought to be freeholders " were repealed for Northern Ireland by section 1(1) of, and the first schedule to, the Statute Law Revision Act 1950 (14 Geo. 6. c. 6), which came into force on 23 May 1950.

== See also ==
- Absence of King William Act 1689 – Act of the Parliament of England
- Crown and Parliament Recognition Act 1689 – Act of the Parliament of England
- Financial Revolution – Economic era of British history
- History of liberalism
- Toleration Act 1689 – Act of the Parliament of England, giving freedom of worship to some nonconformists
- UK constitutional law – Law that constitutes the body politic of the United Kingdom

== Bibliography ==
- Anon. (2010). "The Glorious Revolution". Factsheet General Series. House of Commons Information Office.
- Adams, Maurice; Meuwese, Anne; Hirsch Ballin, Ernst (2017). Constitutionalism and the Rule of Law: Bridging Idealism and Realism. Cambridge University Press. ISBN 9781316585221.
- Billias, George Athan (2011). American constitutionalism heard round the world, 1776–1989: A global perspective. New York: New York University Press. ISBN 9780814725177 – via Google Books.
- Blick, Andrew (2015). "Magna Carta and contemporary constitutional change". History and Policy.
- Carpenter, Edward (1956). The Protestant Bishop. Being the Life of Henry Compton, 1632–1713. Bishop of London. London: Longmans, Green and Company. OCLC 1919768.
- Horwitz, Henry (1977). Parliament, Policy and Politics in the Reign of William III. Manchester University Press. ISBN 978-0-7190-0661-6.
- Lock, Geoffrey (1989). "The 1689 Bill of Rights". Political Studies. 37 (4): 540–561. doi:10.1111/j.1467-9248.1989.tb00288.x. S2CID 143877589.
- Maier, Pauline (1997). American Scripture: Making the Declaration of Independence. New York: Knopf. ISBN 978-0-679-45492-2.
- Schwoerer, Lois G. (1990). "Locke, Lockean Ideas, and the Glorious Revolution". Journal of the History of Ideas. 51 (4): 531–548. doi:10.2307/2709645. JSTOR 2709645.
- Thatcher, Oliver Joseph, ed. (1907). The library of original sources. University Research Extension. p. 10. "Bill of Rights 1689 december 16."
- Walker, Aileen; Gay, Oonagh; Maer, Lucinda (2009). "Bill of Rights 1689". House of Commons Library. Archived from the original on 17 September 2025.
- Williams, E. N. (1960). The Eighteenth-Century Constitution. 1688–1815. Cambridge University Press. OCLC 1146699.
- "Statute Law Revision Act 2007". electronic Irish Statute Book. Attorney General of Ireland. 8 May 2007.
