= Absence of King William Act 1689 =

Act of the Parliament of England

- Act of Parliament
- Parliament of England
- Long title: An Act for the Exercise of the Government by her Majestie dureing his Majestyes Absence.
- Citation: 2 Will. & Mar. c. 6
- Territorial extent: England and Wales

Dates
- Royal assent: 20 May 1690
- Commencement: 20 March 1690 (Note: Start of session.)
- Repealed: 15 July 1867
Other legislation
Repealed by	Statute Law Revision Act 1867
Relates to	Bill of Rights 1689

Status: Repealed

Text of statute as originally enacted

The Absence of King William Act 1689 (2 Will. & Mar. c. 6) was an act of the Parliament of England which stated that Queen Mary II was to govern England whenever her husband, King William III, was absent from England.

The act was passed because, following the Glorious Revolution, the Bill of Rights had enacted that although William and Mary were to reign as joint monarchs (with Mary as a queen regnant, not a mere consort), William alone was to exercise the actual power of government. However William intended to travel to Ireland, and so another act was necessary to provide for the administration of the kingdom while he was abroad.

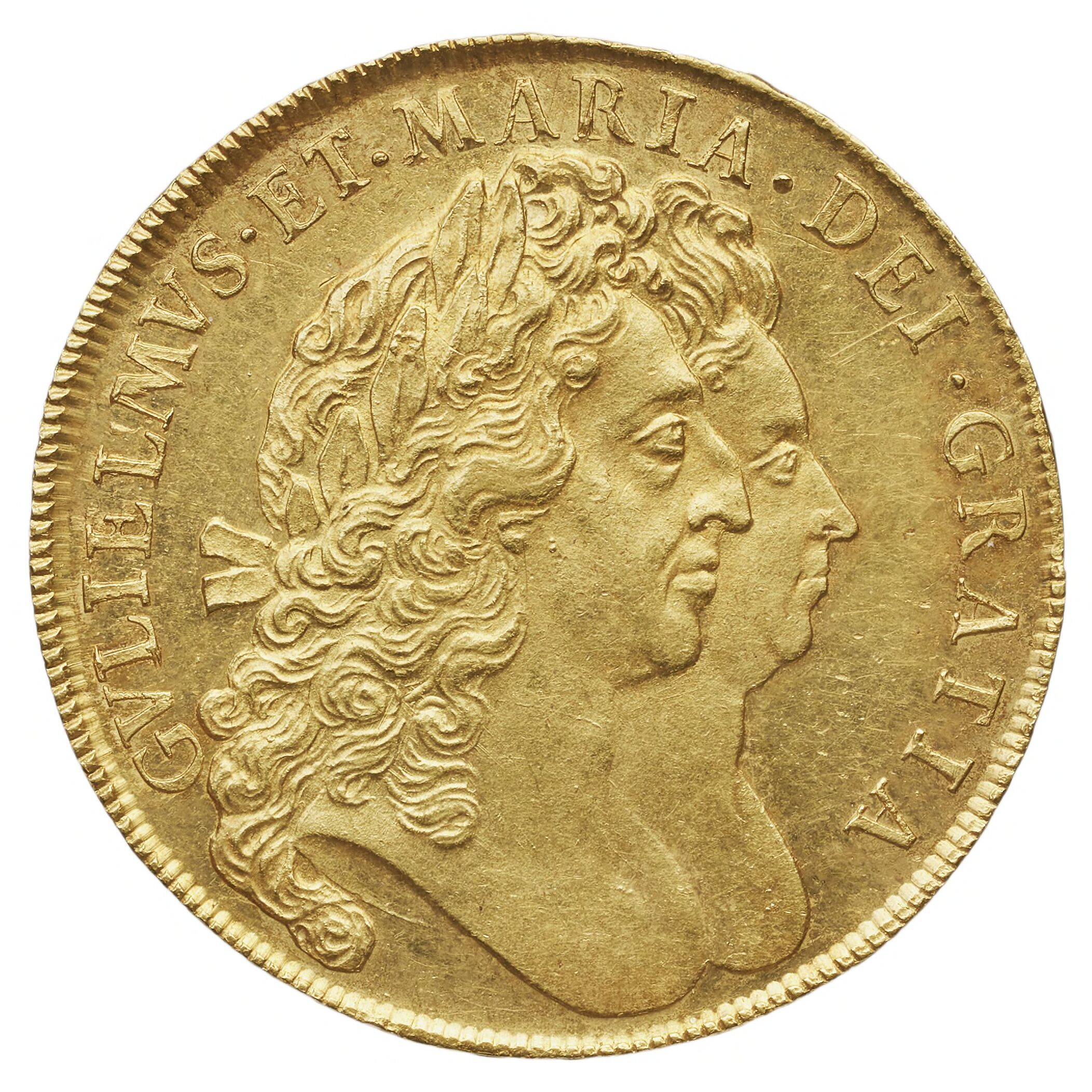
Jugate coin of William and Mary, advertising their position as joint monarchs.

The act declared that "whensoever and as often as it shall happen that his said Majestie shall be absent or continue out of this Realme of England It shall and may be lawfull for the Queens Majestie to exercise and administer the Regall Power and Government of the Kingdome of England Dominion of Wales and Towne of Berwicke-upon-Tweede and the Plantations and Territories thereunto belonging in the Names of both their Majestyes for such time onely dureing their joynt Lives as his said Majestie shall be absent or continue out of this Realme of England any thing in the said Act [the Bill of Rights] to the contrary notwithstanding".

== Subsequent developments ==
The whole act was repealed by section 1 of, and the schedule to, the Statute Law Revision Act 1867 (30 & 31 Vict. c. 59), which came into force on 15 July 1867.
