= Distress for Rent Act 1689 =

Act of the Parliament of England

Distress for Rent Act 1689 (Note: The citation of this act by this short title was authorised by section 5 of, and the second schedule to, the Statute Law Revision Act 1948. Due to the repeal of those provisions, it is now authorised by section 19(2) of the Interpretation Act 1978.)
- Act of Parliament
- Parliament of England
- Long title: An Act for enabling the Sale of Goods distrained for Rent in Case the Rent be not paid in a reasonable time. (Note: These words are printed against this act in the second column of the second schedule to the Statute Law Revision Act 1948, which is headed "Title".)
- Citation: 2 Will. & Mar. c. 5
- Territorial extent: England and Wales

Dates
- Royal assent: 2 May 1690
- Commencement: 20 March 1690 (Note: Start of session.)
- Repealed: 6 April 2014 (Note: The Tribunals, Courts and Enforcement Act 2007 (Commencement No. 11) Order 2014 (SI 2014/768).)
Other legislation
Amended by	Parish Constables Act 1872; Agricultural Holdings (England) Act 1883; Law of Distress Amendment Act 1888; Administration of Justice Act 1965
Repealed by	Tribunals, Courts and Enforcement Act 2007

Status: Repealed

Text of statute as originally enacted

Revised text of statute as amended

The Distress for Rent Act 1689 (2 Will. & Mar. c. 5) was an act of the Parliament of England. Its long title is "An Act for enabling the Sale of Goods distrained for Rent in case the Rent be not paid in a reasonable time."

The whole act was prospectively repealed by sections 86 and 146 of, and paragraph 1 of schedule 14 to, and part 4 of schedule 23 to, the Tribunals, Courts and Enforcement Act 2007. This is consequential on the prospective abolition of distress for rent.
