= Claim of Right 1689 =

Kingdom of Scotland legislation

Claim of Right (Note: The citation of this act by this short title was authorised by section 2 of, and schedule 2 to, the Statute Law Revision (Scotland) Act 1964. Due to the repeal of those provisions it is now authorised by section 19(2) of the Interpretation Act 1978.)
- Act of Parliament
- Parliament of Scotland
- Long title: The Declaration of the Estates of the Kingdom of Scotland containing the Claim of Right and the offer of the Croune to the King and Queen of England.
- Citation: 1689 c. 28 [12mo ed: c. 13]
- Territorial extent: Kingdom of Scotland

Dates
- Royal assent: 11 April 1689
- Commencement: 14 March 1689 (Note: Start of session.)

Other legislation
- Relates to: Coronation Oath Act 1688

Status: Current legislation

Text of statute as originally enacted

Revised text of statute as amended

Text of the Claim of Right Act 1689 as in force today (including any amendments) within the United Kingdom, from legislation.gov.uk.

The Claim of Right (c. 28) (Scottish Gaelic: Tagradh na Còire) is an act passed by the Convention of the Estates, a sister body to the Parliament of Scotland (or Three Estates), in April 1689. It is one of the key documents of United Kingdom constitutional law and Scottish constitutional law.

== Background ==
In the Glorious Revolution, William of Orange invaded England, landing with his Dutch Army in England on 5 November 1688. King James VII of Scotland, who was also King of England and Ireland as James II, attempted to resist the invasion. He then sent representatives to negotiate, and he finally fled England on 23 December 1688.

Whilst the Convention Parliament in England declared that James, as King of England, had abdicated the government, and issued an English Bill of Rights on 13 February 1689 offering the Crown of England to William and Mary, the Scots found themselves facing a more difficult constitutional problem. As James had not been present in Scotland during the crisis and had not fled from Scottish territory in December, it would be highly dubious to claim that he had abdicated the Scots throne.

== Process ==
Therefore, a Convention of the Scottish Estates met to consider letters received on 16 March 1689 from the two contenders for the Crown. On 4 April they voted to remove James VII from office, drawing on George Buchanan's argument on the contractual nature of monarchy.

Later that month, the convention adopted the Claim of Right and the Article of Grievances, enumerating what they saw as the contemporary requirements of Scottish constitutional law. It also declared that, because of his actions in violation of these laws, James had forfeited the Scottish throne.

The convention proceeded to offer the crown on the basis of these documents to William and Mary, who accepted it on 11 May 1689, and were proclaimed King and Queen of the Scots as William II and Mary II, though with subsequent controversy over whether the Claim of Right articles against Episcopacy were fully accepted by the new monarchy.

== Provisions of the act ==
The act includes the passages:

That all Proclamationes asserting ane absolute power to Cass annull and Dissable lawes [...] are Contrair to Law — paragraph 20

That it is the right and privilege of the subjects to protest for remeed of law to the King and Parliament against Sentences pronounced by the lords of Sessione Provydeing the samen Do not stop Execution of these sentences

That it is the right of the subjects to petition the King and that all Imprisonments and prosecutiones for such petitioning are Contrary to law

That for redress of all greivances and for the amending strenthneing and preserveing of the lawes Parliaments ought to be frequently called and allowed to sit and the freedom of speech and debate secured to the members

And they Doe Claim Demand and insist upon all and sundry the premisses as ther undoubted right and liberties And that no Declarationes Doeings or proceedings to the prejudice of the people in any of the said premisses ought in any wayes to be drawne hereafter in Consequence or Example But that all forefaultors fynes loss of offices Imprisonments Banishments pursuits persecutiones tortures and rigorous Executiones be Considered and the pairties læsed be redressed — paragraphs 41-44

== Significance ==
The effect of the Claim of Right was to "bolster the position of parliament within the Scottish constitution at the expense of the royal prerogative". It was affirmed by an act of the Scottish Parliament of 1703 (Act Ratifieing the turning of the Meeting of the Estates in the year 1689, into a Parliament c. 3). The act was retained by the Parliament of the United Kingdom after the Acts of Union 1707.

In 2019, the act was cited by MPs seeking a court ruling that Prime Minister Boris Johnson's September 2019 prorogation of Parliament was unlawful. The Court of Session Outer House judge, Lord Doherty found the claim was non-justiciable, and that if it was justiciable then there was no breach of the Claim of Right. The Inner House allowed the appeal, ruling the issue justiciable and the prorogation unlawful, since its true purpose was to "stymie Parliamentary scrutiny of government action". However, it said this was not a consequence of peculiarities of Scots law or the Claim of Right.
