= List of acts of the Parliament of England from 1689 =

This is a list of acts of the Parliament of England for the year 1689.

For acts passed during the period 1707–1800, see the list of acts of the Parliament of Great Britain. See also the list of acts of the Parliament of Scotland, and the list of acts of the Parliament of Ireland.

For acts passed from 1801 onwards, see the list of acts of the Parliament of the United Kingdom. For acts of the devolved parliaments and assemblies in the United Kingdom, see the list of acts of the Scottish Parliament, the list of acts of the Northern Ireland Assembly, and the list of acts and measures of Senedd Cymru; see also the list of acts of the Parliament of Northern Ireland.

For medieval statutes, etc. that are not considered to be acts of Parliament, see the list of English statutes.

See also the List of ordinances and acts of the Parliament of England, 1642–1660 for ordinances and acts passed by the Long Parliament and other bodies without royal assent, and which were not considered to be valid legislation following the Restoration in 1660.

The number shown after each act's title is its chapter number. Acts are cited using this number, preceded by the years of the reign during which the relevant parliamentary session was held; thus the Union with Ireland Act 1800 is cited as "39 & 40 Geo. 3. c. 67", meaning the 67th act passed during the session that started in the 39th year of the reign of George III and which finished in the 40th year of that reign. The modern convention is to use Arabic numerals in citations (thus "41 Geo. 3" rather than "41 Geo. III"). Acts of the last session of the Parliament of Great Britain and the first session of the Parliament of the United Kingdom are both cited as "41 Geo. 3".

Acts passed by the Parliament of England did not have a short title; however, some of these acts have subsequently been given a short title by acts of the Parliament of the United Kingdom, such as the Short Titles Act 1896 (59 & 60 Vict. c. 14).

Acts passed by the Parliament of England were deemed to have come into effect on the first day of the session in which they were passed. Because of this, the years given in the list below may in fact be the year before a particular act was passed.

== 2 Will. & Mar. ==
The first session of the 2nd Parliament of William and Mary, which met from 20 March 1690 until 7 July 1690.

This session was also traditionally cited as 2 Will. & Mary, 2 Gul. & Mar., 2 Gul. et Mar., 2 W. & M., 2 Will. & Mar. Sess. 1, 2 Will. & Mary, Sess. 1, 2 Gul. & Mar. Sess. 1, 2 Gul. et Mar. Sess. 1 or 2 W. & M. Sess. 1

=== Public acts ===
Short title	Citation	Royal assent
Long title
Crown and Parliament Recognition Act 1689	2 Will. & Mar. c. 1	14 April 1690
An Act for Recognizing King William and Queene Mary and for avoiding all Questions touching the Acts made in the Parliament assembled at Westminster the thirteenth day of February one thousand six hundred eighty eight.
Poll Tax Act 1689 (repealed)	2 Will. & Mar. c. 2	23 April 1690
An Act for Raising Money by a Poll and otherwise towards the Reduceing of Ireland and Prosecuting the Warr against France. (Note: The Nine Years' War.) (Repealed by Statute Law Revision Act 1867 (30 & 31 Vict. c. 59))
Taxation (Liquor) Act 1689 (repealed)	2 Will. & Mar. c. 3	23 April 1690
An Act for granting to their Majestyes for their Lives and the Life of the Survivour of them certaine Impositions upon Beere Ale and other Liquors. (Repealed by Statute Law Revision Act 1867 (30 & 31 Vict. c. 59))
Taxation (Tonnage and Poundage) Act 1689 (repealed)	2 Will. & Mar. c. 4	2 May 1690
An Act for granting to Their Majesties a Subsidie of Tonnage and Poundage and other Sums of Money payable upon Merchandizes Exported and Imported. (Repealed by Statute Law Revision Act 1867 (30 & 31 Vict. c. 59))
Distress for Rent Act 1689 (repealed)	2 Will. & Mar. c. 5	2 May 1690
An Act for enabling the Sale of Goods distrained for Rent in case the Rent be not paid in a reasonable time. (Repealed by Tribunals, Courts and Enforcement Act 2007 (c. 15))
Absence of King William Act 1689 (repealed)	2 Will. & Mar. c. 6	20 May 1690
An Act for the Exercise of the Government by her Majestie dureing his Majestyes Absence. (Repealed by Statute Law Revision Act 1867 (30 & 31 Vict. c. 59))
Parliamentary Elections Act 1689 (repealed)	2 Will. & Mar. c. 7	20 May 1690
An Act to Declare the Right and Freedome of Election of Members to serve in Parlyament for the Cinque Ports. (Repealed by Statute Law Revision Act 1867 (30 & 31 Vict. c. 59))
London, Quo Warranto Judgment Reversed Act 1689	2 Will. & Mar. c. 8	20 May 1690
An Act for Reversing the Judgment in a Quo Warranto against the City of London and for Restoreing the City of London to its antient Rights and Privileges.
Importation Act 1689 (repealed)	2 Will. & Mar. c. 9	20 May 1690
An Act for the discouraging the Importation of Throwne Silke. (Repealed by Importation Act 1825 (6 Geo. 4. c. 29))
General Pardon Act 1689 (repealed)	2 Will. & Mar. c. 10	23 May 1690
An Act for the King and Queens most Gracious Generall and Free Pardon. (Repealed by Statute Law Revision Act 1867 (30 & 31 Vict. c. 59))

=== Private acts ===
Short title	Citation	Royal assent
Long title
Making Wortenbury chapel a distinct church from Bangor parish church.	2 Will. & Mar. c. 1 Pr.	14 April 1690
An Act for the separating and making the Chapel of Worthenbury a distinct Church from the Parish Church of Bangor.
Henry Coventry's Estate Act 1689	2 Will. & Mar. c. 2 Pr.	23 April 1690
An Act to supply a Defect in a former Act of the last Parliament, (Note: Henry Coventry's Estate Act 1688 (1 Will. & Mar. c. 9 Pr.)) for the Sale or Leasing of a House, late Henry Coventrie's Esquire, in Piccadilly.
Enabling John Wolstenholm to sell lands for payment of debts.	2 Will. & Mar. c. 3 Pr.	23 April 1690
An Act to enable John Wolstenholme Esquire to sell Lands, for Payment of Debts.
Making illegitimate any children which Jane, wife of John Lewknor, has or shall have during her elopement from him.	2 Will. & Mar. c. 4 Pr.	23 April 1690
An Act to illegitimate any Child, or Children, which Jane the Wife of John Lewkner Esquire hath had, or shall have, during her Elopement from him.
Enabling Algernoon Earl of Essex to make a jointure for his wife, repay a loan for Lady Morpeth's portion and to settle his estate on his marriage.	2 Will. & Mar. c. 5 Pr.	2 May 1690
An Act to enable Algernon Earl of Essex to make a Wife a Jointure, and for raising of Monies for Payment of Six Thousand Pounds borrowed, to make up the Lady Morpeth's Portion; and to make a Settlement of his Estate on his Marriage.
Making provision for Anthony Earl of Shaftesbury's children.	2 Will. & Mar. c. 6 Pr.	2 May 1690
An Act for the making some Provision for the Daughters and younger Sons of Anthony Earl of Shaftesbury.
For the sale of Harleyford mansion house, the manor of Great Marlow and other lands in Buckinghamshire.	2 Will. & Mar. c. 7 Pr.	2 May 1690
An Act for the Sale of the Capital Messuage or Mansion-house of Ha'leford and Manor of Great Marlow, and other Lands, in the County of Bucks.
Enabling Sir Robert Fenwicke to sell lands for payment of debts.	2 Will. & Mar. c. 8 Pr.	2 May 1690
An Act to enable Sir Robert Fenwicke to sell Lands, for the Payment of his Debts.
Sir Hugh Midleton's Estate Act 1689	2 Will. & Mar. c. 9 Pr.	2 May 1690
An Act for confirming a Settlement made by Sir Hugh Middleton Baronet, for a separate Maintenance for Dame Dorothea his Wife, and for other Trusts; and for the better enabling to sell Part of his Estate, for Payment of his Debts.
Vesting for sale the freehold of the manor and advowson of Lolworth (Cambridgeshire) and other lands in Lolworth and Long Stanton (Cambridgeshire) in trustees for John Edwards of Debden Hall (Essex).	2 Will. & Mar. c. 10 Pr.	2 May 1690
An Act, whereby the Freehold and Inheritance of the Manor of Loleworth, alias Lolworth, and the Advowson of the Church of Loleworth, alias Lolworth, in the County of Cambridge, and divers other Lands and Hereditaments in Loleworth aforeward, and in Long Stanton in the said County, are vested in Altham Smith, of Graies Inns, in the County of Midd. Esquire, and William Gore, of London, Merchant, and their Heirs, in Fee Simple, in Possession, to the Use of them and their Heirs, in Trust for John Edwards of Hebden Hall, in the County of Essex, Esquire, and his Heirs, to the Intent the same may be sold.
Enabling Sir Humphry Forester to settle and dispose of lands.	2 Will. & Mar. c. 11 Pr.	2 May 1690
An Act to enable Sir Humphrey Forrester to settle and dispose of Lands.
Enabling Thomas Berenger to sell lands for payment of debts.	2 Will. & Mar. c. 12 Pr.	2 May 1690
An Act to enable Thomas Berenger Esquire to sell Lands, for Payment of his Debts.
Cadwallader Wynne's Estate Act 1689	2 Will. & Mar. c. 13 Pr.	2 May 1690
An Act to vest the Estate of Cadwallader Wynn Esquire in Trustees, for the Payment of his Debts.
Naturalization of David Le Grand and others.	2 Will. & Mar. c. 14 Pr.	2 May 1690
An Act for the naturalizing of David Le Grand and others.
Hudson's Bay Company Act 1689	2 Will. & Mar. c. 15 Pr.	20 May 1690
An Act for confirming to the Governor and Company trading to Hudson's Bay, their Privileges and Trade.
For encouraging the manufacture of white paper.	2 Will. & Mar. c. 16 Pr.	20 May 1690
An Act for the encouraging and better establishing the Manufacture of White Paper in this Kingdom.
Enabling Sir Edwin Sadlier to sell lands for payment of debts.	2 Will. & Mar. c. 17 Pr.	20 May 1690
An Act to enable Sir Edwin Sadler to sell Lands, for Payment of Debts.
Granting an annuity to Lady Alexander in satisfaction of the lands which she was to have had for her jointure.	2 Will. & Mar. c. 18 Pr.	20 May 1690
An Act for the granting unto Elizabeth, Relict of John Hobey Esquire, and now the Wife of the Lord Alexander, Son and Heir Apparent of Henry Earl of Sterling, in the Kingdom of Scotland, One Annuity, or Yearly Rent Charge, of £. 450, for her Life, in Satisfaction of Five Hundred Pounds per Annum in Lands, which she was to have for her Jointure.

=== Sources ===
- Raithby, John, ed. (1963) [1819]. "2° Gul. & Mar.". Statutes of the Realm. Vol. 6: The Statutes of King James II, and King William and Queen Mary (1685–1694). London: Dawsons. pp. 156–179 – via HathiTrust.
- Raithby, John, ed. (1819). Statutes of the Realm. Vol. 6: 1685-94 – via British History Online.
- Pickering, Danby, ed. (1764). "Sessio Prima. Anno secundo Gulielmi & Mariæ". The Statutes at Large. Vol. 9: From the First Year of K. William and Q. Mary to Eighth Year of K. William III – 1688 to 1695–96. Cambridge: Joseph Bentham. pp. 75–85 – via Internet Archive.
- Pickering, Danby, ed. (1764). "Sessio Prima. Anno secundo Gulielmi & Mariæ". The Statutes at Large. Vol. 9: From the First Year of K. William and Q. Mary to Eighth Year of K. William III – 1688 to 1695–96. Cambridge: Joseph Bentham. pp. 75–85 – via Internet Archive.
- Journals of the House of Commons. Vol. 10. London: His Majesty's Stationery Office. 1803. pp. 347–424 – via Google Books.
- Chronological Table of and Index to the Statutes. Vol. 1: To the End of the Session 59 Vict. Sess. 2 (1895) (13th ed.). London: Her Majesty's Stationery Office. 1896. p. 75 – via Google Books.
- Chronological Table of the Statutes: Covering the Period from 1235 to the End of 1971. London: Her Majesty's Stationery Office. 1972. p. 73. ISBN 978-0-11-840096-1 – via Google Books.
- "Acts of the English Parliament from 1689". legislation.gov.uk. The National Archives.
- "Chronological Tables of the Private and Personal Acts: Part 4 (1685–1694)". legislation.gov.uk. The National Archives.

== See also ==
- List of acts of the Parliament of England
