= Financial Revolution =

Economic era of British history

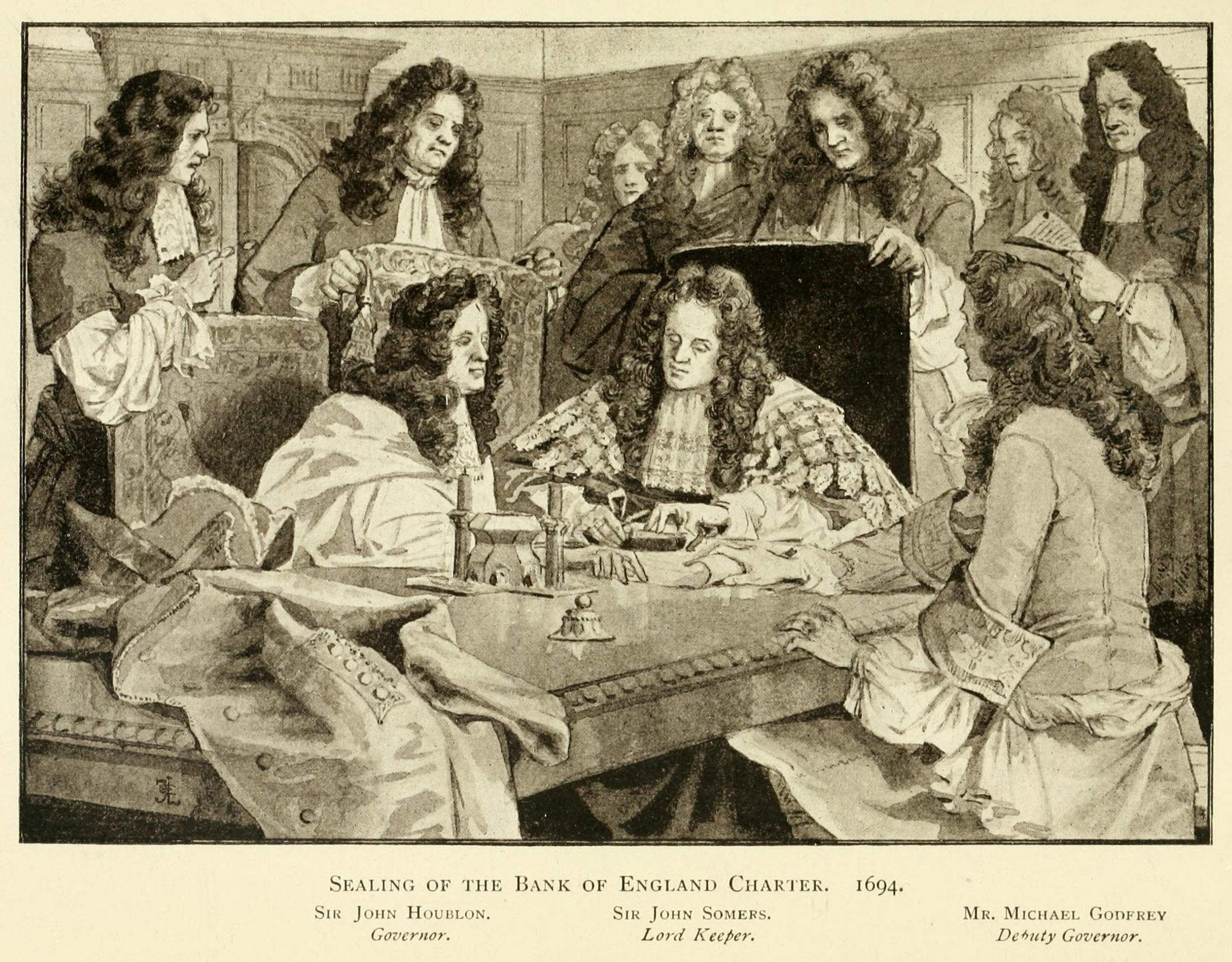
Sealing of the Bank of England Charter (1694) by Lady Jane Lindsay, 1905

The Financial Revolution was a set of economic and financial reforms in Great Britain after the Glorious Revolution in 1688 when William III invaded England. The reforms were based in part on Dutch economic and financial innovations that were brought to England by William III. New institutions were created: a public debt (first government bonds were issued in 1693) and the Bank of England (1694). Soon thereafter, English joint-stock companies began going public. A central aspect of the financial revolution was the emergence of a stock market.

== Dutch-influenced changes in the economy and parliamentarian politics ==
The elements of the financial revolution rested basically on the financial techniques developed in the Netherlands: the bill of exchange, both foreign and inland, which as a negotiable instrument became part of the medium of exchange; transferable shares in the permanent capital stock of corporations that were traded in an active secondary market; and perpetual, government-issued annuities (known as Consols).

Another piece of Financial Revolution which fundamentally altered the relations between the English Crown and the English Parliament was the creation of the Civil List in 1698. This was how Parliament granted the Crown revenues to meet the costs of running the government and royal establishment. From this point, the Crown was reliant on Parliament's control of revenue for its day-to-day running.

== Transition towards a constitutional monarchy ==
There is a strong connection between the Glorious Revolution, the Financial Revolution, and Britain's rise to global power in the eighteenth century. With the creation of a constitutional monarchy, the English Parliament had to approve any further government borrowing and any new taxes (to cover the costs of borrowing). Because bondholders' interests were hence directly represented in the decision-making process, they could be confident that the risk of default was low. Having such a "credible commitment" to the public debt, Britain could borrow more cheaply (at lower interest rates) than was possible for absolute monarchies (such as the Kingdom of France) in which bondholders' voices were not represented in government. Scholars debate whether its constitutional structure alone sufficed to make Britain a credible borrower (this argument, made in a very widely cited article by economic historian Douglass North and political scientist Barry Weingast has been challenged by David Stasavage whose analysis emphasizes the importance of party politics).

== Historiography ==
Eighteenth-century writers already integrated fiscal and military data into narrative histories of the period. For example, James Ralph’s The History of England, During the Reigns of King William, Queen Anne, and King George I (1744–46) appended annual customs and excise series (1689–1726), national-debt tables, and army/militia returns, and used them to evaluate policy. Ralph’s account was notably critical of the "financial revolution", including William III’s war finance, and even faulted contemporaries for omitting discussion of the 1694 Bank of England bill.

== See also ==
- Military Revolution
- Market Revolution
