= Assizes (disambiguation) =

Assize or Assizes, in Old French originally "meeting, conference", may refer to judicial institutions or legal measures taken by those.

== Judicial institutions ==
- Courts of Assizes, a former judicial institution in England and Wales
- Assize (Scotland), in Scots law a trial by jury
- Assizes (Ireland), an obsolete judicial inquest (Court of Assize)
- Cour d'assises, French court in charge of felonies
- Corte d'Assise, Italian court
- Council of Assizes, lawmaking body in New York after its capture from the Dutch
- Court of assizes, criminal court in Belgium
- European Assizes, a one-time assembly of the European Parliament and the national parliaments in 1990

== Legal regulations and measures ==
- Assize of Bread and Ale, an obsolete English statute regulating the price, weight, and quality of the bread and beer
- Assize of Clarendon, 1166 act taken by King Henry II of England
- Assize of darrein presentment, action over right to appoint to a benefice
- Assize of mort d'ancestor, an obsolete action over inheritance of land
- Assize of novel disseisin, an obsolete action to recover lands after dispossession
- Assize of Northampton, additional legal measures taken by Henry II of England
- Grand Assize, 1179 English law about land disputes
- Assizes of Ariano, laws of the Kingdom of Sicily (1140)
- Assizes of Jerusalem, collection of medieval legal treatises used by the Crusaders
- Assizes of Romania, laws of the Latin Empire of Constantinople

== Christianity ==
- Great Assize, term for the Last Judgment

== See also ==
- Assize of Arms (disambiguation)
- Black Assize of Exeter 1586
- Black Assize of Oxford 1577
- Bloody Assize of 1814
- Bloody Assizes
- Clerk of Assize, a position which existed England and Wales 1285–1971
- Manchester Assize Courts, building in Manchester, England
- Short assize, a medieval chess variant
