= History of tort law =

The history of tort law concerns the evolution of actions for torts, wrongs that are not criminal (with prison or punishment), but civil in nature, typically leading to damages or an injunction. In ancient societies the division between torts and crimes was blurred. Debts often led to prison. In England, "trespass" was a type of wrong that included intentional wrongs, and negligence. A self-standing tort of negligence largely emerged over the 19th and early 20th centuries.

== Ancient law ==
- HS Maine, Ancient Law (1861) 328, ‘the penal law of ancient communities is not the law of crimes; it is the law of wrongs, or, to use the English technical word, of torts’

=== Ancient Greece ===
"If a man fails to fulfill an agreed contract - unless he had contracted to do something forbidden by law or decree, or gave his consent under some iniquitous pressure, or was involuntarily prevented from fulfilling his contract because of some unlooked-for accident - an action for such an unfulfilled agreement should be brought in the tribal courts, if the parties have not previously been able to reconcile their differences before arbitrators (their neighbors, that is)."

— Plato, The Laws, Book 11, §23, Contracts.
- Plato, Laws, Book IX and XI
- Aristotle, Nicomaechean Ethics (350 BC) corrective justice etc

=== Ancient Rome ===
- Lunney & Oliphant (2023) ch 1, 1, under Roman law’s action for theft actio furti, the plaintiff could recover ‘double damages’, twice the value of the thing stolen. For manifest theft, caught red handed, fourfold damages.
- Twelve Tables, Table VIII
- Lex Aquilia
- Corpus Juris Civilis
- Ulpian, Digest, 1, 1, 10, “Justice is a fixed and abiding disposition to give every man his rights. The percepts of the law are as follows: to live honorably, to injure no one, to give to every man his own. Jurisprudence is a knowledge of things human and divine, the science of the just and the unjust.”
- Gaius, Digest, 44, 7, 1, ‘Obligations arise either from contract or from wrongdoing or, by some special right, from various types of causes.’

=== Biblical sources ===
- Leviticus 19:18, love thy neighbour
- Luke 6:31, Do unto others, sermon on the mount
- Luke 10:25-27, love your neighbour as yourself

Torts and crimes in common law originate in the Germanic system of compensatory fines for wrongs, with no clear distinction between crimes and other wrongs.

== Medieval law ==
=== England in the Middle Ages ===
In Anglo-Saxon law, most wrongs required payment in money paid to the wronged person or their clan. Fines in the form of wīte (lit. 'blame' or 'fault') were paid to the king or holder of a court for disturbances of public order, while the fine of weregild was imposed on those who committed murder with the intention of preventing blood feuds. Some wrongs in later law codes were botleas 'without remedy' (e.g. theft, open murder, arson, treason against one's lord), that is, unable to be compensated, and those convicted of a botleas crime were at the king's mercy. Items or creatures which caused death were also destroyed as deodands. Alfred the Great's Doom Book distinguished unintentional injuries from intentional ones, and defined culpability based on status, age, and gender. After the Norman Conquest, fines were paid only to courts or the king, and quickly became a revenue source. A wrong became known as a tort or trespass, and there arose a division between civil pleas and pleas of the crown. The petty assizes (i.e. of novel disseisin, of mort d'ancestor, and of darrein presentment) were established in 1166 as a remedy for interference with possession of freehold land. The trespass action was an early civil plea in which damages were paid to the victim; if no payment was made, the defendant was imprisoned. It arose in local courts for slander, breach of contract, or interference with land, goods, or persons. Although the details of its exact origin are unclear, it became popular in royal courts so that in the 1250s the writ of trespass was created and made de cursu (available by right, not fee); however, it was restricted to interference with land and forcible breaches of the king's peace. It may have arisen either out of the "appeal of felony", or assize of novel disseisin, or replevin. Later, after the Statute of Westminster 1285, in the 1360s, the "trespass on the case" action arose for when the defendant did not direct force. As its scope increased, it became simply "action on the case". The English Judicature Act passed 1873 through 1875 abolished the separate actions of trespass and trespass on the case.

In 1401, the English case Beaulieu v Finglam imposed strict liability for the escape of fire; additionally, strict liability was imposed for the release of cattle. Negligently handling fire was of particular importance in these societies given capacity for destruction and relatively limited firefighting resources. Liability for common carrier, which arose around 1400, was also emphasised in the medieval period. Unintentional injuries were relatively infrequent in the medieval period.

- J Baker, An Introduction To English Legal History (4th 2000) 585, writ of trespass vi et armis required the defendant ‘to show why with force and arms he made assault on the [plaintiff] at [a place] and beat, wounded and ill-treated him so that his life was despaired of, and offered other outrages against him, to the grave damage of the self-same [plaintiff] and against our peace’.
- FW Maitland, The Forms of Action at Common Law (1909) writs as old causes of action. Types of trespass, esp. from Henry III
- Farrier’s Case (1372) Baker and Milsom (2009) allowed to plead trespass on the case without need to show with force and arms
- Beaulieau v Fingham (1401) B&M 610 ‘the common custom of this realm is common law and need not be pleaded.’

== Early modern period ==
- Hugo Grotius, Introduction to Dutch Jurisprudence (1634) §§III, 17-18, tort is one kind of law where person bound to restore equilibrium when they cause an inequality.
- Mitchil v Alestree (1676) 1 Vent 295 plaintiff sued successfully for being kicked by horse in Little Lincoln's Inn Fields (now New Square) because it was wrong to try and break in a horse there
- Holt CJ in Coggs v Bernard (1703) 2 Ld Raym 909 (negligence), Ashby v White (1703) 92 ER 126 (right to vote), Lane v Cotton (1701) 1 Ld. Raym 546 (dissenting, public and private officials should have same liability) cf Whitfield v. Lord Le Despencer (1778) 98 ER 1344, Lord Mansfield, Postmaster not a common carrier
- Reynolds v Clarke (1725) 1 Str 634, 636, Fortescue J, distinguished direct harm (writ of trespass) and indirect harm (trespass on the case): ‘if a man throws a log into the highway, and in that act it hits me; I may maintain trespass, because it is an immediate wrong; but if, as it lies there, I tumble over it, and receive an injury, I must bring an action upon the case; because it is only prejudicial in consequence, for which originally I could have no action at all.’
- Entick v Carrington (1765)
- W Blackstone, Commentaries on the Laws of England (1765) contained a volume on "private wrongs" as torts and even used the word tort in a few places

== Industrial revolution ==
=== Continental Europe ===
- Code Napoleon 1810
- German Civil Code 1900

=== United Kingdom ===
- Williams v Holland (1833) 2 LJCP (NS 190) Court of Common Pleas held a plaintiff could ‘waive’ trespass and instead sue in case where plaintiff’s injury was by ‘carelessness and negligence’ of the defendant, even if the act was immediate, so long as it was not willful.
- Vaughan v Menlove (1837) 132 ER 490 (CP) concept of the reasonable person
- Bird v Jones (1845) 7 QB 742, right to liberty, freedom of movement (across bridges).
- JS Mill, On Liberty (1859) harm principle

=== United States ===
- OW Holmes, The Common Law

== Twentieth century ==
Modern torts are heavily affected by insurance and insurance law, as many cases are settled through claims adjustment rather than by trial, and are defended by insurance lawyers, with the insurance policy setting a ceiling on the possible payment.

== See also ==
- US tort law
- English tort law
