= 1170s in England =

Events from the 1170s in England.

== Incumbents ==
- Monarch – Henry II

== Events ==
1170

- April – Inquest of Sheriffs: Henry II looks into the financial dealings of local officials.
- 14 June – Henry II has his 15-year-old son Henry the Young King crowned by Roger, Archbishop of York, as junior king and heir to the English throne. The coronation drives the Pope to allow the exiled Thomas Becket (whose privilege as Archbishop of Canterbury to crown monarchs has been infringed) to lay an interdict on England as punishment, and this threat forces Henry to negotiate with Becket. Sir William Marshal is appointed tutor-in-arms to Henry the Young King.
- 22 July – Becket controversy: Reconciliation between Henry II and Becket at Fréteval in Western France.
- 21 September – Anglo-Norman invasion of Ireland: Following a siege, combined Anglo-Norman and Irish forces led by Richard de Clare, 2nd Earl of Pembroke, seize the city of Dublin, forcing Ascall mac Ragnaill, last King of Dublin, into exile.
- November – Becket excommunicates three bishops.
- 1 December – Becket controversy: Henry II sends word that his conflict with Becket is at an end, and his lands will be restored. Becket returns to England, landing at Sandwich, Kent.
- 25 December – Becket preaches in Canterbury Cathedral.
- 29 December – murder of Thomas Becket by four of Henry II's knights – Reginald Fitzurse, Hugh de Morville, William de Tracy and Richard le Breton (who believe themselves to be carrying out the king's wishes) – inside Canterbury Cathedral, after his refusal to be arrested for breaking his agreement with Henry II.
- Earliest record of the making of Cheddar cheese in Somerset.

1171

- 16 October – Henry II lands in Ireland and declares himself Lord of Ireland.

1172

- 17 April – Henry leaves Ireland, having received the support of the Church and princes for his claim.
- 21 May – in Avranches Cathedral, Henry II performs a ceremony of penance for the death of Becket. This leads to the Compromise of Avranches which absolves him from censure for the murder and ends the Becket controversy, reconciling him with the papacy.
- Summer – 14-year-old Prince Richard is formally recognized as duke of Aquitaine at a ceremony in Poitiers.
- 27 August – formal marriage and coronation of Henry the Young King, son of Henry II, and Margaret of France by Rotrou (archbishop of Rouen) at Winchester Cathedral.
- Henry II and Humbert III, Count of Savoy, agree to the marriage of their respective heirs, John and Alicia, although the Revolt of 1173–1174 and death of Alicia prevent this from taking place.

1173

- 21 February – canonisation of Thomas Becket; his tomb at Canterbury becomes a shrine and popular pilgrimage destination.
- March – Henry the Young King withdraws to the French court, marking the beginning of the Revolt of 1173–1174, a dispute between King Henry II, his estranged wife Eleanor of Aquitaine and three of their sons over the territories they control. Eleanor is placed under de facto house arrest. William the Lion, King of Scotland, invades the North of England in support of the rebellion.
- 17 October – Revolt of 1173–74: Battle of Fornham – Flemish mercenaries under rebel leader Robert de Beaumont, Earl of Leicester, are defeated while fording the River Lark in Suffolk by the English royalists under Lord Richard de Lucy. Petronilla de Grandmesnil, Countess of Leicester, is present in armour.

1174

- 7 April – Richard of Dover enthroned as Archbishop of Canterbury.
- 8 July – Henry the Young King and Eleanor of Aquitaine take ship for England from Barfleur. As soon as they disembark at Southampton, Eleanor is imprisoned in the care of Ralph fitzStephen, in which condition she remains until 1189.
- 12 July – Henry II does penance at Canterbury for the murder of Becket.
- 13 July – Battle of Alnwick: William I of Scotland is captured by Ranulf de Glanvill after attacking England in support of the revolt.
- 5 September – the choir of Canterbury Cathedral is destroyed by fire.
- 30 September – Treaty of Montlouis: the rebellion of Henry II's sons ends peacefully.
- 8 December – Treaty of Falaise signed between Henry II and William I of Scotland permits William's release in return for homage.
- Horse racing at Newmarket is first recorded, making it the earliest known racing venue of the post-classical era.

1175

- Henry's son, Richard, begins to subjugate remaining rebels against English rule in Aquitaine.
- October – Treaty of Windsor: Henry II recognises Ruaidrí Ua Conchobair as High King of Ireland in return for payment of tribute.

1176

- January – the Assize of Northampton passed, making criminal penalties more severe.
- Construction of the first stone-built London Bridge begins.

1177

- May – Council of Oxford: Henry II grants Cork and Limerick to English barons, provides for the administration of Leinster and makes his son, John of England, Lord of Ireland. He also grants lordships in Shropshire to his brother-in-law, Prince Dafydd ab Owain Gwynedd.
- 21 September – Pact of Ivry: Non-aggression treaty between England and France, which also lays the foundations for the Third Crusade.
- Byland Abbey is established on its final site in Yorkshire by the Cistercians.
- Abbas Benedictus becomes abbot of Peterborough.
- Possible date – Richard FitzNeal begins to write his treatise Dialogus de Scaccario ("Dialogue concerning the Exchequer").

1178

- Foundation of the first Carthusian abbey in England, at Witham in Somerset.

1179

- April – establishment of the Grand Assize, using a jury to decide legal claims over property ownership, instead of trial by combat.
- Richard completes the subjugation of Aquitaine.
- Preston, Lancashire, is granted a Guild Merchant charter by Henry II.
- Woodstock, Oxfordshire, is granted a market charter by Henry II.
- William the Englishman takes over the rebuilding of the choir and Trinity Chapel of Canterbury Cathedral after the previous architect, William of Sens, is injured in a fall, introducing the Early English Gothic style of architecture.
- Westminster School is founded by the monks of Westminster Abbey.

== Births ==
1171

- Matilda of Chester, Countess of Huntingdon (died 1233 in Scotland)

1172

- Ranulph de Blondeville, 4th Earl of Chester (died 1232)

1174

- 20 November(?) – Edmund of Abingdon, archbishop, sanctified (died 1240)

1175

- Robert Grosseteste, statesman, theologian and bishop (approximate date; died 1253)

1176

- Henry de Bohun, 1st Earl of Hereford (died 1220)

1177

- Robert de Ros, baron (died 1226)

== Deaths ==
1170

- 29 December – Thomas Becket, Archbishop of Canterbury (born c. 1118)

1171

- 8 August – Henry of Blois, bishop of Winchester since 1129 (born 1111)

1173

- Roger de Clare, 3rd Earl of Hertford (born 1116)

1176

- 25 October – William d'Aubigny, 1st Earl of Arundel, politician (born c. 1109)
- Rosamund Clifford, mistress of Henry II of England (born 1150)

1177

- Before March – Hugh Bigod, 1st Earl of Norfolk (born 1095)
