= Statute of Westminster 1275 =

English statute

- Act of Parliament
- Parliament of England
- Long title: None
- Citation: 3 Edw. 1. cc 1–51
- Territorial extent: England, later extended to Wales, Scotland, Ireland and British colonies

Dates
- Royal assent: April or May 1275 (Note: The statute states this as the date - "These be the Acts of King Edward... made at Westminster at his first Parliament general after his Coronation, on the Monday of Easter Utas, the Third Year of his Reign"; however chronicle records suggest Parliament may not have sat until the beginning of May.)
- Commencement: April or May 1275
Other legislation
Amended by	Criminal Statutes Repeal Act 1827; Offences against the Person Act 1828; Criminal Statutes (Ireland) Repeal Act 1828; Criminal Law (India) Act 1828; Statute Law Revision Act 1863; Statute Law (Ireland) Revision Act 1872; Civil Procedure Acts Repeal Act 1879; Statute Law Revision and Civil Procedure Act 1881; Sheriffs Act 1887; Statute Law Revision Act 1887; Coroners Act 1887; Statute Law Revision Act 1948; Criminal Law Act 1967; Theft Act 1968; Statute Law (Repeals) Act 1969
Relates to	Statute of Westminster 1285; Scandalum Magnatum Act 1378

Status: Partially repealed

Text of statute as originally enacted

Text of the Statute of Westminster, The First (1275) as in force today (including any amendments) within the United Kingdom, from legislation.gov.uk.

The Statute of Westminster of 1275 (3 Edw. 1), also known as the Statute of Westminster I, codified the existing law in England, into 51 chapters. Chapters 5 (which mandates free elections) and 50 (which provided savings for the crown) are still in force in the United Kingdom and the Australian state of Victoria whilst part of Chapter 1 remains in force in New Zealand. It was repealed in Ireland in 1983.

William Stubbs gives a summary of the statute:

This act is almost a code by itself; it contains fifty-one clauses, and covers the whole ground of legislation. Its language now recalls that of Canute or Alfred, now anticipates that of our own day; on the one hand common right is to be done to all, as well poor as rich, without respect of persons; on the other, elections are to be free, and no man is by force, malice or menace, to disturb them. The spirit of the Great Charter is not less discernible: excessive amercements, abuses of wardship, irregular demands for feudal aids, are forbidden in the same words or by amending enactments. The inquest system of Henry II of England, the law of wreck, and the institution of coroners, measures of Richard and his ministers, come under review as well as the Provisions of Oxford and the Statute of Marlborough.

Though it is a matter of dispute when peine forte et dure (Law French for "hard and forceful punishment") was first introduced, chapter 3 states that those felons standing mute shall be put in prison forte et dure.

== History ==
The Statute of Westminster of 1275 was one of two English statutes largely drafted by Robert Burnell and passed during the reign of Edward I. Edward I had returned from the Ninth Crusade on 2 August 1274 and was crowned King of England on 19 August. His first Parliament was summoned for the quinzaine of the Purification on 16 February 1275 but was prorogued until the day after Easter on 22 April 1275, but did not meet until the week commencing 29 April or, according to Chronicle records, until the beginning of May, for unknown reasons. It met at Westminster, its main work being the consideration of the Statute of Westminster I, the agreement of new levies in Ireland and allowing the King to levy a new tax on wool. This was drawn up, not in Latin, but in Norman French, and was passed "by the assent of Archbishops, Bishops, Abbots, Priors, Earls, Barons, and [all] the Commonalty of the Realm, being thither summoned."

== Chapters ==
The Statute of Westminster I is composed of 51 chapters, originally written in Norman French.

The act was extended to Ireland by Poynings' Law 1495 (10 Hen. 7. c. 22 (I)).

Chapter	Subject	Repealing act (if any)				
Chapter	Subject	England & Wales	Ireland	Queensland	New Zealand	India
1	The Peace of the Church and the Realm shall be maintained. Religious Houses shall not be overcharged.	Statute Law Revision Act 1863 (26 & 27 Vict. c. 125)	Statute Law (Ireland) Revision Act 1872 (35 & 36 Vict. c. 98)		In force by Imperial Laws Application Act 1988	
2	A Clerk convict of Felony, delivered to the Ordinary, shall not depart without Purgation.	Criminal Statutes Repeal Act 1827 (7 & 8 Geo. 4. c. 27)	Criminal Statutes (Ireland) Repeal Act 1828 (9 Geo. 4. c. 53)			Criminal Law (India) Act 1828 (9 Geo. 4. c. 74)
3	No Penalty for an Escape before it be adjudged.	Statute Law Revision Act 1863 (26 & 27 Vict. c. 125)	Statute Law (Ireland) Revision Act 1872 (35 & 36 Vict. c. 98)			
4	What shall be adjudged Wreck of the Sea, and what not.	Statute Law Revision Act 1863 (26 & 27 Vict. c. 125)	Statute Law (Ireland) Revision Act 1872 (35 & 36 Vict. c. 98)			
5	AND because Elections ought to be free, the King commandeth upon great Forfeiture, that no Man by Force of Arms, nor by Malice, or menacing, shall disturb any to make free Election.	In force	Electoral Act 1963			
6	Amerciaments shall be reasonable, and according to the Offence.	Criminal Law Act 1967				
7	In what manner, and of whom, Purveyance shall be made for a Castle.	Statute Law Revision Act 1863 (26 & 27 Vict. c. 125)	Statute Law (Ireland) Revision Act 1872 (35 & 36 Vict. c. 98)			
8	Nothing shall be taken for Fair Pleading.	Statute Law Revision Act 1863 (26 & 27 Vict. c. 125)	Statute Law (Ireland) Revision Act 1872 (35 & 36 Vict. c. 98)			
9	All Men shall be ready to pursue Felons.	Sheriffs Act 1887 (50 & 51 Vict. c. 55) and Coroners Act 1887 (50 & 51 Vict. c. 71) (Note: The Sheriffs Act 1887 (50 & 51 Vict. c. 55) had repealed it except for the end portion "so far as that portion relates to coroners"; the Coroners Act 1887 (50 & 51 Vict. c. 71) repealed "the whole chapter, so far as relates to coroners.")		Criminal Code Act 1899		
10	What sort of Men shall be Coroners. Sheriffs shall have Counter-Rolls with them.	Coroners Act 1887 (50 & 51 Vict. c. 71)				
11	Replevin by the Writ of Odio & Atia. Who shall be triers of Murther.	Offences against the Person Act 1828 (9 Geo. 4. c. 31)	Offences Against the Person (Ireland) Act 1829 (10 Geo. 4. c. 34)			Criminal Law (India) Act 1828 (9 Geo. 4. c. 74)
12	The Punishment of Felons refusing lawful Trial.	Statute Law Revision Act 1863 (26 & 27 Vict. c. 125)	Statute Law (Ireland) Revision Act 1872 (35 & 36 Vict. c. 98)			
13	The Punishment of him that doth ravish a Woman.	Offences against the Person Act 1828 (9 Geo. 4. c. 31)	Offences Against the Person (Ireland) Act 1829 (10 Geo. 4. c. 34)			Criminal Law (India) Act 1828 (9 Geo. 4. c. 74)
14	Appeal against the Principle and Accessary.	Statute Law Revision Act 1863 (26 & 27 Vict. c. 125)	Statute Law (Ireland) Revision Act 1872 (35 & 36 Vict. c. 98)			
15	Which Prisoners be mainpernable, and which not. The Penalty for unlawful Bailment.	Criminal Law Act 1826 (7 Geo. 4. c. 64) and Sheriffs Act 1887 (50 & 51 Vict. c. 55)	Criminal Statutes (Ireland) Repeal Act 1828 (9 Geo. 4. c. 53) and Sheriffs Act 1887 (50 & 51 Vict. c. 55)			
16	None shall distrain out of his Fee, not drive the Distress out of the county.	Statute Law (Repeals) Act 1969 (Note: This repeal extended to Northern Ireland.)	Statute Law Revision Act 1983	Property Law Act 1974		
17	The Remedy if the Distress be impounded in a Castle or Fortress.	Statute Law Revision Act 1863 (26 & 27 Vict. c. 125)	Statute Law (Ireland) Revision Act 1872 (35 & 36 Vict. c. 98)			
18	Who shall assess the common Fines of the county.	Statute Law Revision Act 1863 (26 & 27 Vict. c. 125)	Statute Law (Ireland) Revision Act 1872 (35 & 36 Vict. c. 98)			
19	A Sheriff having received the King's Debt, shall discharge the Debtor.	Statute Law Revision and Civil Procedure Act 1881 (44 & 45 Vict. c. 59)				
20	Offenses committed in Parks and Ponds. Robbing of tame Beasts in a Park.	Criminal Statutes Repeal Act 1827 (7 & 8 Geo. 4. c. 27)	Criminal Statutes (Ireland) Repeal Act 1828 (9 Geo. 4. c. 53)			Criminal Law (India) Act 1828 (9 Geo. 4. c. 74)
21	No Waste shall be made in Wards Lands; nor in Bishops, during the Vacation.	Civil Procedure Acts Repeal Act 1879 (42 & 43 Vict. c. 59)				
22	The Penalty of an Heir marrying without Consent of his Guardian. A Woman Ward.	Statute Law Revision Act 1863 (26 & 27 Vict. c. 125)	Statute Law (Ireland) Revision Act 1872 (35 & 36 Vict. c. 98)			
23	None shall be distrained for a Debt that he oweth not.	Statute Law Revision Act 1863 (26 & 27 Vict. c. 125)	Statute Law (Ireland) Revision Act 1872 (35 & 36 Vict. c. 98)			
24	The Remedy if an Officer of the King do disseise any.	Civil Procedure Acts Repeal Act 1879 (42 & 43 Vict. c. 59)		Escheat (Procedure and Amendment) Act 1891		
25	None shall commit Champerty, to have Part of the Thing in Question.	Criminal Law Act 1967	Statute Law Revision Act 1983			
26	None of the King's Officers shall commit Extortion.	Theft Act 1968		Criminal Code Act 1899		
27	Clerks of Officers shall not commit Extortion.	Statute Law Revision Act 1863 (26 & 27 Vict. c. 125)	Statute Law (Ireland) Revision Act 1872 (35 & 36 Vict. c. 98)			
28	Clerks shall not commit Maintenance.	Criminal Law Act 1967	Statute Law Revision Act 1983			
29	The Penalty of a Serjeant or Pleader committing Deceit.	Statute Law Revision Act 1948 (11 & 12 Geo. 6. c. 62)				
30	Extortion by Justices Officers.	Statute Law Revision Act 1863 (26 & 27 Vict. c. 125)	Statute Law (Ireland) Revision Act 1872 (35 & 36 Vict. c. 98)			
31	The Penalty for taking excessive Toll in a City, &c. Murage granted to Cities.	Theft Act 1968				
32	The Penalty of Purveyors not paying for what they take. The King's Carriages.	Statute Law Revision Act 1863 (26 & 27 Vict. c. 125)	Statute Law (Ireland) Revision Act 1872 (35 & 36 Vict. c. 98)			
33	No Maintainers of Quarrels shall be suffered.	Statute Law Revision Act 1863 (26 & 27 Vict. c. 125)	Statute Law (Ireland) Revision Act 1872 (35 & 36 Vict. c. 98)			
34	None shall report slanderous News, whereby Discord may arise.	Statute Law Revision Act 1887 (50 & 51 Vict. c. 59)				
35	The Penalty for arresting within a Liberty those that hold not thereof.	Civil Procedure Acts Repeal Act 1879 (42 & 43 Vict. c. 59)				
36	Aid to make the Son Knight, or to marry the Daughter.	Statute Law Revision Act 1863 (26 & 27 Vict. c. 125)	Statute Law (Ireland) Revision Act 1872 (35 & 36 Vict. c. 98)			
37	The Penalty of a Man attainted of Disseisin with Robbery in the King's Time.	Statute Law Revision Act 1863 (26 & 27 Vict. c. 125)	Statute Law (Ireland) Revision Act 1872 (35 & 36 Vict. c. 98)			
38	An Attaint shall be granted in Plea of Land touching Freehold.	Statute Law Revision Act 1863 (26 & 27 Vict. c. 125)	Statute Law (Ireland) Revision Act 1872 (35 & 36 Vict. c. 98)			
39	Several Limitations of Prescription in several Writs.	Statute Law Revision Act 1863 (26 & 27 Vict. c. 125)	Statute Law (Ireland) Revision Act 1872 (35 & 36 Vict. c. 98)			
40	Voucher to Warranty, and Counter-pleading of Voucher.	Statute Law Revision Act 1863 (26 & 27 Vict. c. 125)	Statute Law (Ireland) Revision Act 1872 (35 & 36 Vict. c. 98)			
41	The Champion's Oath in a Writ of Right.	Statute Law Revision Act 1863 (26 & 27 Vict. c. 125)	Statute Law (Ireland) Revision Act 1872 (35 & 36 Vict. c. 98)			
42	Certain Actions wherein after Appearance the Tenant shall not be Essoined.	Statute Law Revision Act 1863 (26 & 27 Vict. c. 125)	Statute Law (Ireland) Revision Act 1872 (35 & 36 Vict. c. 98)			
43	The shall be no Fourcher by Essoin.	Statute Law Revision Act 1863 (26 & 27 Vict. c. 125)	Statute Law (Ireland) Revision Act 1872 (35 & 36 Vict. c. 98)			
44	In what Case Essoin ultra mare shall not be allowed.	Statute Law Revision Act 1863 (26 & 27 Vict. c. 125)	Statute Law (Ireland) Revision Act 1872 (35 & 36 Vict. c. 98)			
45	In what Cases the great Distress shall be awarded. Where the Justices Estreats shall be delivered.	Statute Law Revision Act 1863 (26 & 27 Vict. c. 125)	Statute Law (Ireland) Revision Act 1872 (35 & 36 Vict. c. 98)			
46	One Plea shall be decided by the Justices before another commenced.	Statute Law Revision Act 1863 (26 & 27 Vict. c. 125)	Statute Law (Ireland) Revision Act 1872 (35 & 36 Vict. c. 98)			
47	In what Case the Nonage of the Heir of the Disseisor or Disseisee shall not prejudice.	Statute Law Revision Act 1863 (26 & 27 Vict. c. 125)	Statute Law (Ireland) Revision Act 1872 (35 & 36 Vict. c. 98)			
48	The Remedy where a Guardian maketh a Feoffment of his Ward's Land. Suit by Prochein Amy.	Statute Law Revision Act 1863 (26 & 27 Vict. c. 125)	Statute Law (Ireland) Revision Act 1872 (35 & 36 Vict. c. 98)			
49	The Tenants Plea in a Writ of Dower.	Statute Law Revision Act 1863 (26 & 27 Vict. c. 125)	Statute Law (Ireland) Revision Act 1872 (35 & 36 Vict. c. 98)			
50	AND Forasmuch as the King hath ordained these things unto the Honour of God and Holy Church, and for the Commonwealth, and for the Remedy of such as be grieved, he would not that at any other time it should turn in Prejudice of himself, or of his Crown; but that such Right, as appertains to him, should be saved in all points.	Unclear, but legislation.gov.uk states that only Chapter 3 remains in force.				
51	Assises and Darrain Presentments at what Time taken.	Statute Law Revision Act 1863 (26 & 27 Vict. c. 125)	Statute Law (Ireland) Revision Act 1872 (35 & 36 Vict. c. 98)			

== Ireland ==
In the early history of the Lordship of Ireland, English statutes were often applied to Ireland. A 1285 writ authorised Stephen de Fulbourn, then Justiciar of Ireland, to apply there English statutes including Westminster I, Westminster II, Gloucester, and those of merchants. A 1320 act of the Parliament of Ireland (13 Edw. 2. c.2) readopted all these statutes. An act of Edward Poynings' 1495 session of the Parliament of Ireland adopted statutes "formerly made for the common weal" in England; later the Maintenance and Embracery Act 1634 adopted all English statutes dealing with champerty and maintenance and embracery. Many chapters of the 1275 English statute were repealed with respect to Ireland by the Statute Law (Ireland) Revision Act 1872 (35 & 36 Vict. c. 98). In the Republic of Ireland, the Short Titles Act 1962 assigned the short title "Distress Act 1275" to chapter 16 of the 1275 English statute, as adopted under the 1495 Irish act; and the short title "Maintenance and Champerty Act 1275" to chapters 25 and 28 of the 1275 English statute, as adopted under the 1634 Irish act. The Statute Law Revision Act 1983 repealed the whole of the 1275 English statute and the 1285 and 1320 Irish statutes.

== North America ==
Chapter 39 of the Statute decreed that customs in force before the beginning of the reign of Richard I in 1189 did not need to be proven through historical records: in later legal parlance, such customs had held "since time immemorial". As English common law was transferred to North America, in Canada and the USA, the concept of "time immemorial" became important to debates over Indigenous rights, though the date of 1189 specifically is seldom used.

== See also ==
- Statute of Westminster 1285
- Quia Emptores of 1290 is sometimes called the statute of Westminster III

== Additional reading ==
- Tomlins, Thomas Edlyne; Raithby, John (1810). Statute of Westminster 1275 [3 Edw. I. - A.D. 1275 Statute I]. The Statutes of the Realm: Printed by Command of His Majesty King George the Third; in pursuance of an Address of the House of Commons of Great Britain. Vol. I. London, Great Britain: Dawson of Pall Mall. pp. 26–39. OCLC 426777557.
