= 1210s in England =

Events from the 1210s in England.

== Incumbents ==
- Monarch – John (to 19 October 1216), then Henry III

== Events ==
- 1210
  - 20 June – King John lands at Waterford. He later builds castles, including the first stone castle at Dublin, and appoints Justiciars over Ireland.
  - c. November – three "leopards" (probably lions) given to Henry III by Frederick II, Holy Roman Emperor, become the first creatures in the menagerie at the Tower of London.
- 1211
  - June – King John campaigns against Welsh prince Llywelyn the Great.
  - English occupy Ceredigion and build Aberystwyth Castle.
  - King John sends a gift of herrings to nunneries in almost every shire despite his status as an excommunicant.
- 1212
  - June – Welsh rebels burn Aberystwyth Castle.
  - 10 July – the most severe of several early fires of London burns most of the city to the ground.
  - November – John sends a peace mission to Pope Innocent III in a dispute over who would become the next Archbishop of Canterbury.
  - First defended dockyard at Portsmouth built.
- 1213
  - King John becomes the first English monarch recorded as giving gifts of Royal Maundy money to the poor, at Rochester, Kent.
  - 13 May – the interdict on England is lifted by the papal legate when King John accepts Stephen Langton as Archbishop of Canterbury.
  - 30 May – Battle of Damme: English fleet under William Longespée, 3rd Earl of Salisbury destroys a French fleet off the Flemish port of Damme.
  - 3 June – King John and Llywelyn the Great sign a truce.
  - 15 November – a council of knights is held in Oxford.
  - Beverley Minster's central tower collapses; rebuilding commences in 1214.
- 1214
  - 15 February – John lands an invasion force at La Rochelle.
  - 13 April (approx.) – Simon of Apulia elected to the office of Bishop of Exeter, vacant since 1206 (consecrated 5 October).
  - 20 June – papal ordinance defines the rights of the scholars at the University of Oxford.
  - 27 July – Battle of Bouvines: Philip II of France defeats an army of Imperial German, English and Flemish soldiers led by Otto IV, Holy Roman Emperor, in the Kingdom of France, ending the Anglo-French War (1202–14); William Longespée, 3rd Earl of Salisbury is captured.
  - 18 September – Treaty of Chinon signed by John and Philip II of France recognising the Capetian gains from the Angevin Empire.
  - c. 13 October – John returns to England, landing at Dartmouth.
  - 4 November – John attends a chapter election at Bury St Edmunds Abbey in an attempt to resolve a dispute over the vacant abbacy there.
  - 20 November – meeting of barons at Bury St Edmunds Abbey resolves to compel the king to accept the Charter of Liberties of 1100 (There is doubt as to the existence, timing and nature of this meeting.)
  - 21 November – John issues a charter of liberties to the church guaranteeing freedom of canonical elections.
  - 4 December – Llywelyn the Great captures Shrewsbury without resistance.
- 1215
  - 3 May – barons led by Robert Fitzwalter renounce their allegiance to the King and attack Northampton.
  - 17 May – rebellious barons occupy London.
  - 15 June – barons force King John at Runnymede to put the Great Seal of the Realm on a set of articles confirming their rights and those of the towns and Church, and confirming the status of trial by jury, which on 19 June is confirmed as Magna Carta.
  - 24 August – Pope Innocent III declares Magna Carta invalid by papal bull triggering the First Barons' War.
  - September – First Barons' War: rebels capture Rochester.
  - 11 October–30 November – First Barons' War: King John besieges Rochester Castle and starves the rebels into surrender.
  - December – First Barons' War: Alexander II of Scotland invades northern England.
- 1216
  - January – First Barons' War: English army sacks Berwick-on-Tweed and raids southern Scotland.
  - February – First Barons' War: rebellion in East Anglia quickly suppressed.
  - 21 May – First Barons' War: Louis, Count of Artois invades England in support of the barons, landing in Thanet. Entering London without opposition, he is proclaimed, but not crowned, King of England at Old St Paul's Cathedral.
  - 9 July – First Barons' War: Odiham Castle (completed 1214) surrenders to the French after a 2-week siege.
  - 11 October – First Barons' War: retreating from the French invasion, King John loses the Crown Jewels in The Wash.
  - 18 October or 19 October – John dies at Newark Castle, Nottinghamshire; he is succeeded by his nine-year-old son Henry III of England, with William Marshal as regent.
  - 28 October – the nine-year-old Henry III is crowned at Gloucester; he will reign until his death in 1272.
  - 12 November – Marshal and the papal legate to England, Guala Bicchieri, issue a Charter of Liberties, based on Magna Carta, in the King's name from Bristol.
  - Roger of Wendover begins to cover contemporary events in his continuation of the chronicle Flores Historiarum.
- 1217
  - 20 May – First Barons' War: The French are defeated at the Battle of Lincoln by forces led by Marshal. Lincoln is pillaged and the French survivors forced to flee south.
  - 21 August – First Barons' War: The French fleet is defeated at the Battle of Dover.
  - 23 August – First Barons' War: The French fleet is destroyed at the Battle of Sandwich.
  - 12 September – Treaty of Kingston upon Thames ends the First Barons' War: French and Scots to leave England, amnesty granted to rebels.
  - 20 September – Treaty of Lambeth signed ratifying the Kingston treaty.
  - 6 November – Charter of the Forest issued to supplement Magna Carta.
- 1218
  - March – Treaty of Worcester recognises Llywelyn the Great as regent of south Wales.
- 1219
  - Spring – In a gathering at his home in Caversham, the dying William Marshal, 1st Earl of Pembroke, places the regency of England in the hands of the Papal legate Pandulf Verraccio.
  - May – Llywelyn ravages Pembrokeshire after the death of Marshal.
  - Michaelmas – Statutes Fair in Burton upon Trent first held.
  - Henry III recognises de facto Papal abolition of trial by ordeal.

== Births ==
- 1210
  - 22 July – Joan of England, Queen Consort of Scotland, wife of Alexander II of Scotland (died 1238)
- 1212
  - approximate date – William Longespée the Younger, Crusader (killed in action 1250 in Egypt)
- 1214
  - Isabella of England, daughter of John of England (died 1241)
  - possible date – Roger Bacon, philosopher (died c.1292)
- 1218
  - Sir Maurice de Berkeley, knight (died 1281)

== Deaths ==
- 1212
  - 12 December – Geoffrey, Archbishop of York (born 1152)
- 1213
  - Geoffrey Fitz Peter, 1st Earl of Essex (born c. 1162)
- 1214
  - 31 October – Leonora of England, queen of Alfonso VIII of Castile (born 1162)
  - John de Gray, bishop of Norwich (year of birth unknown)
- 1215
  - 3 or 4 February – Eustace, Dean of Salisbury, Lord Chancellor (year of birth unknown)
- 1216
  - 18 October or 19 October – John of England (born 1166)
- 1217
  - 10 September – William de Redvers, 5th Earl of Devon, nobleman (year of birth unknown)
  - 14 October – Isabel of Gloucester, wife of King John of England (born c. 1173)
  - 30 December – Richard de Clare, 4th Earl of Hertford, politician (born c. 1153)
  - Alexander Neckam, scholar and teacher (born 1157)
  - Approximate date – William of Wrotham, royal administrator (year of birth unknown)
- 1219
  - 14 May – William Marshal, 1st Earl of Pembroke, soldier and statesman (born 1146 or 1147)
  - 3 November – Saer de Quincy, 1st Earl of Winchester, rebel baron (born 1155)
