= Assize of Northampton =

Law of English land ownership in 1176

The Assize of Northampton is among a series of measures taken by King Henry II of England that solidified the rights of the knightly tenants and made all possession of land subject to and guaranteed by royal law. The assize is believed to have been passed at a council held in Northampton in January 1176. It was largely based on the Assize of Clarendon of 1166.

== Clarendon extended ==
The assize confirmed the offences to be brought forward by the jury of presentment according to Clarendon, and added arson and forgery to the list. It also set down new and severe punishments that could be handed down, including the removal of an offender's right hand.

== Aftermath of revolt ==
Following as it did the Revolt of 1173–74, the Assizes included a wide-ranging oath of fealty (Item 6), as well as items concerning castles (8 and 11), insisting especially that "the justices see to it that the castles which have been destroyed are utterly demolished."

== Administrative reforms ==
The assize is connected with the reorganisation of itinerant justices and contains instructions for six groups of justices appointed to tour the country. Bailiffs and sheriffs were made answerable for their profits, as well as given powers to hold thieves. Clause 7 dealt with the introduction of important new legislation, chiefly the king's right to have certain cases brought into his court.

The Assize of Northampton is also the first official document to contain information on the question of seisin and disseisin, anticipating the later possessory assizes of mort d'ancestor and novel disseisin.

== Revenue ==
Crown revenue increased significantly following the Assize, reflecting the impact of the judicial eyres. As G. M. Trevelyan put it, "The Justices were quite as busy collecting the King's revenues as enforcing the King's peace. They were two sides of the same operation."

== Manuscript ==
The text is preserved in Roger of Howden's Gesta Henrici Secundi.

== See also ==
- Assize of darrein presentment
- Inquest of Sheriffs
