= National Career Fairs =

Company

National Career Fairs Inc.
- Industry: Employment
- Founded: 2001
- Headquarters: Henderson, Nevada, United States
- Products: Job Fairs
- Number of employees: 20
- Website: nationalcareerfairs.com

National Career Fairs is a company founded in 2001 by Scott Lobenberg to produce job fairs in cities across the United States. The events are a place where jobseekers meet face-to-face with employers, educational institutions, and professional résumé writers.

== Company information ==
National Career Fairs has its headquarters in Henderson, Nevada, and is under the leadership of Scott Lobenberg, founder and president, and Diana Nicholson, CEO. The company was incorporated in 2001, and produced 12 job fairs its first year. The number of events increased to 275 job fairs in 76 cities in 2007, and increased to over 350 events in 2008. The company has 20 employees.
