= National assizes of 1967 (Estates General of French Canada) =

The National assizes of 1967 were the second meeting of the Estates General of French Canada. They were held from November 23 to 26 at Place des Arts in Montreal, Quebec, Canada.

== Preparation ==
The preparation of the national assizes of 1967 started soon after the conclusion of the Preliminary assizes of 1966. The Estates General launched a subscription to gather the sum of C$300,000 as decreed by the delegates during the preliminary assizes. That money went to organizing the elections, defraying the travelling expenses of the delegation from the provinces other than Quebec, paying the salary of 12 employees, renting rooms, buy publicity, office expenses (paper, stamps, copies), etc.

In the December 1966 issue of L'Action nationale, the organizers felt compelled to make their own constitutional positions publicly known in reply to the rumour mill that had been running for over a year. They had to defend themselves from the accusation of being "separatists".

== Participants ==
Participants to the national assizes of 1967 belonged to two categories: delegates and observers. The first numbered 1623 people and the second 436, for a total of 2059 participants. Delegation members were in turn subdivided into three groups: the territorial delegation, the associations' delegation and the exterior delegation.

Territorial delegation

On April 16, 1967, 1620 delegates, 15 in each of the Quebec's 108 electoral districts, were elected by some 17,000 representatives of citizens' associations and other institutions of civil society. These constituted the territorial delegation. 79% of the 17,000 members who had the right to vote participated to the election and consequently the representation was judged valid according to the criteria set by the preliminary assizes. In comparison, during the preliminary assizes of November 1966, the Estates General recorded the presence of 1075 territorial delegates and 17 substitutes, accounting for 68% of all elected delegates. The average age of the delegates was 41 years old.

Delegation of the associations

549 French-Canadian associations or institutions were invited to appoint a delegate to the assizes. 261 such delegates were appointed and 167 participated to the event.

Exterior delegation

The delegates representing the French-Canadian and Acadian minority groups numbered 430 people. Representing 17% of the French-speaking population of Canada, they were grouped into three regions: Ontario which had the right to 201 delegates sent 88, Acadia (or the Maritime provinces) sent 85 of 124 possible delegates and Western Canada sent 91 of 96. There were accordingly 364 delegates representing francophones from Canada outside Quebec. Francophone minorities from the United States were not represented, but they were numerous among the observers.

Observers

491 observer passes were emitted by the Estates General. 437 people made use of such passes. Among the observers were four diplomats (three consuls of France and one ambassador from Rwanda), 11 members of the Quebec or Canadian parliament, seven senior officials, 11 delegated from Franco-American institutions and one delegate from Belgium, 23 academics and councillors, 66 representatives of various associations or institutions, 177 individual observers, and 92 representatives of the printed press.

== Progress ==
Before the opening of the national assizes, the delegation received some "basic documents" and "working papers" prepared by the general commission from the resulting work of the preliminary assizes. According to the general commission, the intention behind these somewhat technical documents were to "lay down on a realistic and reasoned basis" the particular problems of French Canada while remaining accessible to the public. In doing this, the commission attempted to give a direction to the discussion so that it does not produce "dialogues of the deaf which turn to fist fight or bawling out" that never fail to occur when the constitutional options available to French Canadians are at issue. Still according to the general commission, these options were described as the status quo, cooperative federalism, a particular status, associated state, or full sovereignty.

During the opening session of November 23, the general assembly of delegated listened to an introductory prayer by Mgr Paul Grégoire, a speech by Mayor of Montreal Jean Drapeau, a posthumous tribute to Lionel Groulx presented by the executive director of the Estates General Rosaire Morin, and finally a speech by Jacques-Yvan Morin, president general of the organizing commission. The premier of Quebec, Daniel Johnson, and the leader of the opposition, Jean Lesage, each communicated a message. The delegates then adopted the rules and procedures of the national assizes, which consisted of six "technical projects": 1) the procedures governing the study groups, 2) the procedure of the workshops (revision groups), 3) the procedure of the general assemblies, 4) the voting mechanism, 5) the election of the general commission, and 6) the agenda or program of the assizes.

The work of the assizes was carried on the basis of 255 teams of eight delegates who participated to 17 study groups. The matter to be studied by the Estates General was grouped in four workshops (cultural, social, economic, political) which treated four questions each, except the economic workshop which treated five.

Cultural workshop (A)	Social workshop (B)	Economic workshop (C)	Political workshop (D)
A-1) Education and research; A-2) Language status; A-3) Radio and broadcasting; A-4) Relations among French Canadians	B-1) Labour legislation; B-2) Population and immigration; B-3) Social security and health care; B-4) Family and family policy	C-1) Financial and trade legislation; C-2) Fiscal policy; C-3) Economic development; C-4) Agricultural policy; C-5) Banking and currency	D-1) Constitutional arbitration and penal organization; D-2) Territorial integrity; D-3) Indefinitely extensible powers; D-4) International relations

After expressing their opinions on the questions chosen from the working papers, teams reunited with their study group in order to vote on these opinions and formulate two draft resolutions, one pertaining to Quebec, the other pertaining to minorities residing in Canada outside Quebec.

The draft resolutions were subsequently submitted to five revision groups (nuances, interrogation, amplification, opposition and support). Members of the study groups were entering the revision groups by random selection. After the revision phase, the final draft resolutions were put to the vote by the assembly of all delegates who met as part of six plenary sessions. The vote was carried and recorded on the basis of the four regions represented to the Estates General (Quebec, Ontario, Acadia, and Western Canada).

== Resolutions ==
As first item to the agenda of the assizes on November 24, economics professor François-Albert Angers gave a speech entitled "Preliminary declaration on the right to self-determination". Angers concluded his speech by calling the delegates to proceed to the unanimous adoption of a resolution asserting that:

1. French Canadians constitute a nation.
2. Quebec constitutes the national territory and fundamental political milieu of this nation.
3. The French-Canadian nation has the right to self-determination and to freely choose the political regime under which she intends to live.

The resolution was not adopted unanimously, but nevertheless by a strong majority. 98% of the Quebec delegates voted in favour of the resolution. 1% voted against and 1% abstained. In the three regions of Canada outside Quebec, the result were a lot more divided.

Among the delegates from Acadia, 52% were favourable, 14% were against and 34% abstained. 35% of the delegates of Ontario voted in favour, 55% against, and 10% abstained. In the West, the voted varied greatly from one province to the next. 59% of the delegates of British Columbia voted in favour, 74% of those from Manitoba abstained, 63% of those from Saskatchewan and 68% from Alberta voted against.

In addition to the preliminary resolution on the self-determination of the French-Canadian nation, the delegates of the national assizes of 1967 voted on 16 resolutions emanating from the cultural, social, economic and political workshops. Two were rejected, one on fiscal policy (C-2), the other on banking and currency (C-5). No vote was recorded on the question of constitutional arbitration and penal organization (D-1).

Resolution	Quebec	Ontario	Acadia	West
Education and research	97% yes 1% no 2% abst.	86% yes 5% no 9% abst.	80% yes 2% no 18% abst.	88% yes 6% no 6% abst.
Language status	94% yes 3% no 3% abst.	51% yes 27% no 22% abst.	77% yes 11% no 12% abst.	44% yes 21% no 35% abst.
Radio and broadcasting	90% yes 7% no 3% abst.	26% yes 59% no 15% abst.	50%yes 18% no 32% abst.	30% yes 33% no 37% abst.
Relations among French Canadians	96% yes 2% no 2% abst.	93% yes 7% no 0% abst.	91%yes 0% no 9% abst.	74% yes 1% no 25% abst.
Labour legislation	83% yes 10% no 7% abst.	26% yes 52% no 22% abst.	31%yes 31% no 38% abst.	27% yes 26% no 47% abst.
Population and immigration	96% yes 2% no 2% abst.	53% yes 29% no 18% abst.	48%yes 29% no 23% abst.	46% yes 24% no 30% abst.
Social security and health care	98% yes 1% no 1% abst.	51% yes 25% no 24% abst.	55%yes 13% no 32% abst.	54% yes 17% no 29% abst.
Family and family policy	97% yes 2% no 1% abst.	72% yes 12% no 16% abst.	79%yes 0% no 21% abst.	64% yes 3% no 33% abst.
Financial and trade legislation	91% yes 5% no 4% abst.	47% yes 31% no 22% abst.	55%yes 14% no 31% abst.	29% yes 16% no 55% abst.
Economic development	94% yes 4% no 2% abst.	35% yes 36% no 29% abst.	58%yes 10% no 32% abst.	27% yes 33% no 40% abst.
Agricultural policy	98% yes 1% no 1% abst.	82% yes 9% no 9% abst.	69%yes 10% no 21% abst.	57% yes 3% no 40% abst.
Territorial integrity	96% yes 2% no 2% abst.	58% yes 26% no 16% abst.	62%yes 6% no 32% abst.	33% yes 23% no 43% abst.
Indefinitely extensible powers	89% yes 5% no 6% abst.	44% yes 33% no 23% abst.	34%yes 5% no 61% abst.	20% yes 36% no 44% abst.
International relations	93% yes 5% no 2% abst.	73% yes 18% no 9% abst.	64%yes 23% no 13% abst.	39% yes 30% no 31% abst.
