= 1100s in England =

Events from the 1100s in the Kingdom of England.

== Incumbents ==
- Monarch – William II (until 2 August 1100), then Henry I

== Events ==
- 1100
  - 2 August – King William II dies in a hunting accident in the New Forest; his brother Henry I claims the throne.
  - 5 August – coronation of Henry I at Westminster Abbey. He issues the Charter of Liberties to mark his coronation.
  - 23 September – Archbishop of Canterbury Anselm returns from exile at the invitation of Henry I.
  - 11 November – Henry I marries Matilda of Scotland, daughter of King Malcolm III of Scotland, at Westminster Abbey.
- 1101
  - 3 February – Ranulf Flambard, bishop of Durham, escapes from the Tower of London and flees to Normandy where he joins Robert Curthose, duke of Normandy, who has just returned from the Crusades.
  - 20 July – Robert Curthose lands at Portsmouth to claim the English throne.
  - 2 August – By the Treaty of Alton, ratified at Winchester, Robert recognises his younger brother Henry I as King of England.
- 1102
  - Henry I has a series of charges drawn up against the rebel Robert of Bellême, Earl of Shrewsbury (particularly relating to unlicensed castle building), and, when Robert refuses to answer to them, persuades Robert's former vassal and ally Iorwerth ap Bleddyn, prince of Powys, to besiege and capture Robert's castles in Shropshire. The king deprives Robert of his English lands and titles, besieges and takes his castle at Arundel and banishes him and his brothers from England, so he returns to Normandy where he continues his rebellion. Bridgnorth becomes a royal borough. Robert's brother Arnulf de Montgomery, lord of Pembroke, being banished from England and Wales, goes to serve his father-in-law, Muirchertach Ua Briain, High King of Ireland.
  - Gerald de Windsor is appointed by the king as Constable of Pembroke Castle and lord of the manor of Moulsford.
  - Council of London reforms the clergy and prohibits homosexuality.
  - The tomb of Edward the Confessor is opened and the body is found to be perfectly preserved.
- 1103
  - 27 April – Investiture Controversy: Anselm goes into exile after a dispute with Henry I.
  - 10 August – a huge storm devastates crops.
  - Iorwerth ap Bleddyn, prince of Powys, having been insufficiently rewarded for his actions the previous year, again rebels against Henry I and is arraigned before a royal tribunal at Shrewsbury, convicted and imprisoned.
- 1104
  - Henry I attempts to restore order in Normandy.
  - 3 September – St. Cuthbert is reburied in Durham Cathedral and the St. Cuthbert Gospel of St. John removed.
- 1105
  - Henry I invades Normandy.
  - Henry captures Bayeux and Caen.
- 1106
  - 28 September – Henry I defeats his brother Robert Curthose, Duke of Normandy, at the Battle of Tinchebray, and imprisons him in Devizes castle; Edgar Atheling and William Clito are also taken prisoner.
- 1107
  - 11 August – Investiture Controversy: reconciliation of Henry I and Anselm is marked by the mass consecration of bishops by Anselm at the royal Palace of Westminster: William Giffard to Winchester, Roger to Salisbury, Reynelm to Hereford, William Warelwast to Exeter and Urban to Llandaff. Roger of Salisbury is also appointed Justiciar of England this year.
  - Autumn – the Norwegian king Sigurd the Crusader overwinters in England on the first stage of the Norwegian Crusade to Palestine.
  - Tower of Winchester Cathedral collapses. Rebuilding commences the following year.
- 1108
  - Consecration of Chichester Cathedral.
  - Construction of Southwell Minster begins.
  - Walcher of Malvern produces his first lunar tables.
- 1109
  - 21 April (Holy Wednesday) – death of Archbishop Anselm of Canterbury. Ralph d'Escures, Bishop of Rochester, who is at his deathbed, acts as administrator of the see of Canterbury until appointed Anselm's successor in 1114.
  - First Bishop of Ely (Hervey le Breton) enthroned.

== Births ==
- 1100
  - Biddenden Maids, supposed earliest known conjoined twins (died 1134)
  - Approximate date
    - Nicholas Breakspear, Pope Adrian IV (died 1159 in Holy Roman Empire)
    - Gilbert de Clare, 1st Earl of Pembroke (died 1148)
- 1102
  - c. 7 February – Empress Matilda, Queen of the Romans and claimant to the throne of England (died 1167 in Normandy)
- 1103
  - 5 August – William Adelin, son of Henry I (died 1120 in the White Ship)
  - Approximate date – Adeliza of Louvain, wife of Henry I (died 1151 in Brabant)
- 1104
  - Robert, 2nd Earl of Leicester (died 1168)
- 1105
  - Approximate date – Matilda of Boulogne, sovereign Countess of Boulogne and wife of Stephen of England (died 1152)

== Deaths ==
- 1100
  - 2 August – William II of England (born c. 1056 in Normandy)
  - 18 November – Thomas of Bayeux, Archbishop of York
- 1101
  - 27 July – Hugh d'Avranches, 1st Earl of Chester, magnate (born c. 1047 in Normandy)
- 1102
  - 15 July – Walter Giffard, 1st Earl of Buckingham, Anglo-Norman magnate
- 1103
  - Osbern FitzOsbern, bishop of Exeter
- 1104
  - Serlo, abbot of Gloucester
- 1106
  - 28 September (doubtful date) – Robert Malet, baron
- 1107
  - March – Robert Fitzhamon, Norman baron of Gloucester
  - 8 September – Richard de Redvers, warrior and baron (born c. 1066 in Normandy)
  - 9 September – Roger Bigod of Norfolk, Norman knight
  - 26 September – Maurice, bishop of London and Lord Chancellor
- 1108
  - 7 March – Gundulf, bishop of Rochester (born c.1024 in Normandy)
  - 21 May – Gerard, Archbishop of York and Lord Chancellor
  - Summer – Urse d'Abetot, Norman Sheriff of Worcestershire
- 1109
  - 21 April – Anselm, Archbishop of Canterbury (born 1033 in Italy)
  - 16 November – Ingulf, Benedictine abbot of Crowland
