= Hiring and mop fairs =

Fairs where labourers were hired

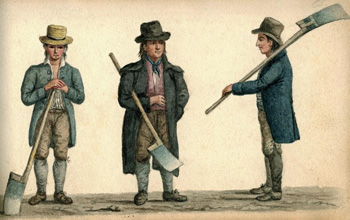
Three labourers with "facks" (spades) at an Irish hiring fair

Hiring fairs, also called statute or mop fairs, were regular events in pre-modern Great Britain and Ireland where labourers were hired for fixed terms. They date from the time of Edward III, and his attempt to regulate the labour market by the Statute of Labourers in 1351 at a time of a serious national shortage of labour after the Black Death. Subsequent legislation, in particular the Statute of Apprentices of 1563, legislated for a particular day when the high constables of the shire would proclaim the stipulated rates of pay and conditions of employment for the following year. Because so many people gathered at a fair, it quickly turned into the major place for matching workers and employers. Hiring fairs continued well into the 20th century, up to the Second World War in some places but their function as employment exchanges was diminished by the Corn Production Act 1917. This legislation guaranteed minimum prices for wheat and oats, specified a minimum wage for agricultural workers and established the Agricultural Wages Board, to ensure stability for farmers and a share of this stability for agricultural workers.

Annual hiring fairs were held, during Martinmas week at the end of November, in the market towns of the East Riding of Yorkshire in places like Beverley, Bridlington, Driffield, Hedon, Hornsea, Howden, Hull, Malton, Patrington, Pocklington, and York. Both male and female agricultural servants would gather in order to bargain with prospective employers and, hopefully, secure a position for the coming year. The yearly hiring included board and lodging for single employees for the whole year with wages being paid at the end of the year's service. These fairs attracted all the other trappings of a fair, and they turned into major feasts in their own right, and attracted poor reputations for the drunkenness and immorality involved. Later, when wage rates and conditions were no longer officially set, the hiring fair remained a useful institution, especially as much employment in rural areas was by annual agreement. Prospective workers would gather in the street or market place, often sporting some sort of badge or tool to denote their speciality. Shepherds held a crook or a tuft of wool, cowmen brought wisps of straw, dairymaids carried a milking stool or pail and housemaids held brooms or mops; this is why some hiring fairs were known as mop fairs. Employers would look them over and, if they were thought fit, hire them for the coming year, handing over a shilling to seal the arrangement.

== History ==
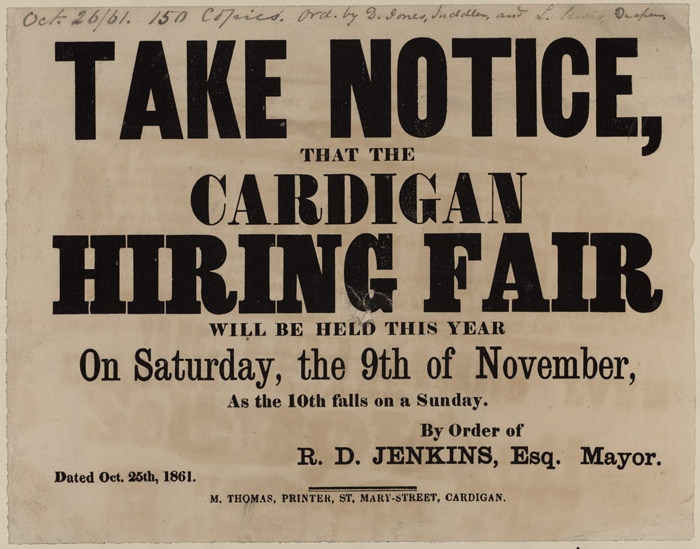
An advertisement for a hiring fair in 1861

Farm workers, labourers, servants and some craftsmen would work for their employer from October to October. At the end of the employment they would attend the mop fair dressed in their Sunday best clothes and carrying an item signifying their trade. A servant with no particular skills would carry a mop head. The 'tassle' worn on their lapel was the emblem of the employee's trade - for instance shepherds would wear a piece of wool in their buttonholes, whereas farmers might hold a piece of straw, and this tassle became known as a 'mop', hence the term "mop fair. Hiring fairs were also known as statute fairs (or statutes) because an Act of Parliament of 1677 endorsed the yearly bonds made between masters and servants at them.

Employers would move amongst them discussing experience and terms, and once agreement was reached the employer would give the employee a small token of money, known as the “fasten-penny,” usually a shilling, which “fastened” the contract for a year. The employee would then remove the item signifying their trade and wear bright ribbons to indicate they had been hired. The stalls set up, at the fair, selling food and drink and offering games to play, would tempt the employee to spend their token money. The whole event became a major festival and eventually was condemned for the drunkenness and immorality they encouraged.

Michaelmas Day is celebrated on 29 September but mop fairs were tied to the seasons and the harvest, not the calendar. When the Gregorian calendar was adopted in 1752 and eleven days dropped from that year, events associated with the end of the harvest moved eleven days later to 10 October. This date is known as "Old Michaelmas Day" and since 1752 was the date of the mop fairs. Although many towns continue to hold mop fairs to this day, traditional hiring fairs had ceased by the middle of the 20th century.

=== Mop towns ===
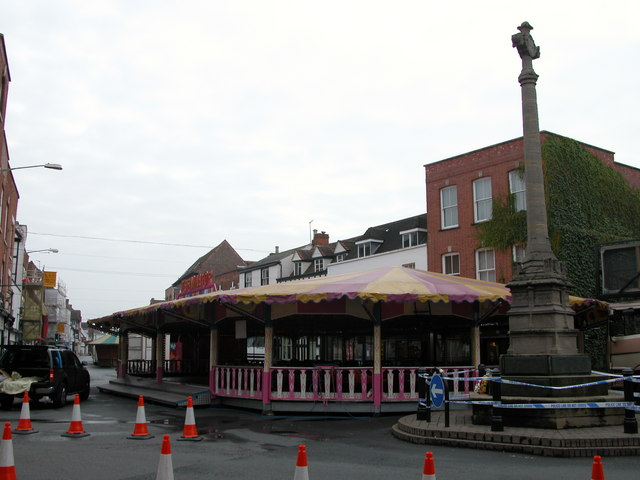
Preparations for Tewkesbury mop fair showing its dodgem car feature

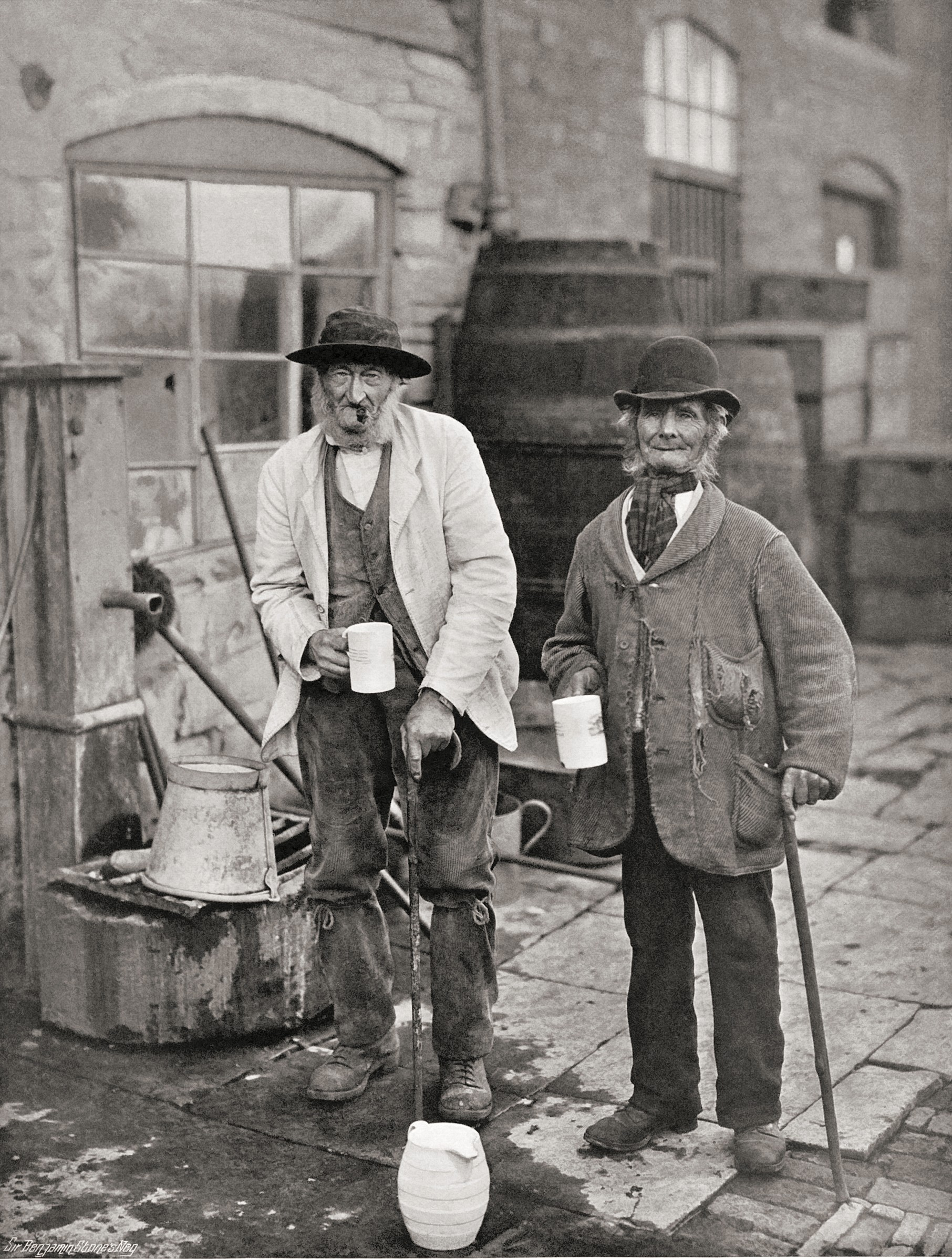
A photograph, taken c. 1900, by Sir Benjamin Stone, of two villagers at the Bidford Mop, an annual fair held at Michaelmas in the village of Bidford-on-Avon

The following towns have a history of holding mops and still hold one each year on or around Michaelmas Day. A theme common to these towns is that they were, several hundred years ago, medium-sized thriving market towns surrounded by a large number of smaller villages, hence their obvious choice as the location for the mop.

- Alcester
- Banbury
- Burton upon Trent (the Statutes Fair)
- Chipping Norton
- Chipping Sodbury
- Cirencester
- Daventry
- Evesham
- Kings Norton
- Ledbury
- Marlborough
- Moreton in Marsh
- Sherborne, Pack Monday Fair
- Southam
- Stratford upon Avon
- Tewkesbury
- Warwick

=== Modern mops ===
Tewkesbury and other mop fairs typically take over the entire town centre for two days, attracting thousands of visitors. Many of the rides at the mop are fast, brightly lit and very noisy including traditional rides such as carousels and helter-skelters.

At Ashby-de-la-Zouch Ashby Statutes is held every September. Instituted by Royal Statute, it was originally a hiring fair.

== See also ==
- Dudsday – a hiring fair at Kilmarnock in Scotland
- Job fair
