= Estates General of French Canada =

The Estates General of French Canada (French: États généraux du Canada français) were a series of three assizes held in Montreal, Quebec, Canada between 1966 and 1969. Organized by the Ligue d'action nationale and coordinated by the Fédération des Sociétés Saint-Jean-Baptistes du Québec (FSSJBQ), the stated objective of these Estates General was to consult the French-Canadian people on their constitutional future.

== Origins ==
According to Rosaire Morin, editor of the L'Action nationale review, the idea of the Estates General was launched by the FSSJBQ in 1961. Annual assemblies gathering the representatives of several French-Canadian associations occurred around that time, but these involved no more than 30 people.

In May 1963, MLA Jean-Jacques Bertrand presented a motion in the Legislative Assembly of Quebec in which he asked for the setting up of "a special committee to prepare the convocation of the French-Canadian General Estates". However, this move was not followed and the initiative of convening the Estates General came from civil society instead of the Quebec Parliament.

In April 1964, the proposal of the FSSJBQ regarding the Estates General was endorsed by various associations and intermediary bodies of Quebec's civil society. In November 1965, a provisional committee composed of 27 members was set up to try to reach out as many associations as possible.

The December 1965 issue of L'Action nationale contained a first article treating the subject of the history and functioning of the Estates General in France. A second article on the same subject was published in the February 1966 issue. A third one was intended for the May–June 1966 issue, but this issue was never published.

The president of the Estates General, lawyer Albert Leblanc, was appointed to the Superior Court of Quebec during the course of the year 1966 and was replaced by law professor Jacques-Yvan Morin.

== Preliminary assizes of 1966 ==
The Preliminary assizes of 1966 were the first meeting of the Estates General of French Canada. The assizes, held from November 25 to 27 at Université de Montréal, were said to be preliminary because their objective was to prepare the working material on the basis of which the subsequent assizes were to debate.

== National assizes of 1967 ==
The National assizes of 1967 were the second meeting of the Estates General of French Canada. They were held from November 23 to 26 at Place des Arts in Montreal. The delegates adopted among others an important resolution pertaining to the right to self-determination of the French Canadians in the territory of Quebec, which was declared the "national territory and fundamental political milieu" of their nation.

== National assizes of 1969 ==
The National assizes of 1969 were the third and last meeting of the Estates General of French Canada. They were held from March 5 to 9 at the Queen Elizabeth Hotel. The delegates adopted among others an important resolution proposing to convene a constituent assembly for the drafting of the constitution of Quebec.

== Timeline ==
- 1966 – On September 13, election of the territorial delegates to the preliminary assizes.
- 1966 – From November 25 to 27, the preliminary assizes are held at Université de Montréal.
- 1967 – On April 16, election of the territorial delegates to the first national assizes.
- 1967 – From November 23 to 26, the first national assizes are held at Place des Arts in Montreal.
- 1969 – From March 5 to 9, the second national assizes are held at the Queen Elizabeth Hotel in Montreal.
