= Assize of Arms =

Assize of Arms may refer to:

- Assize of Arms of 1181, concerning the obligations of certain classes of persons to have arms, and of their obligation to swear allegiance to the king
- Assize of Arms of 1252, concerning the enforcement of the Assize of Arms of 1181, and the appointment of constables to summon men to arms, quell breaches of the peace, and to deliver offenders to the sheriff

== See also ==
- Assizes (disambiguation)
