= Roger of Howden =

12th-century English historian

- Persona (Minster Head) of Howden
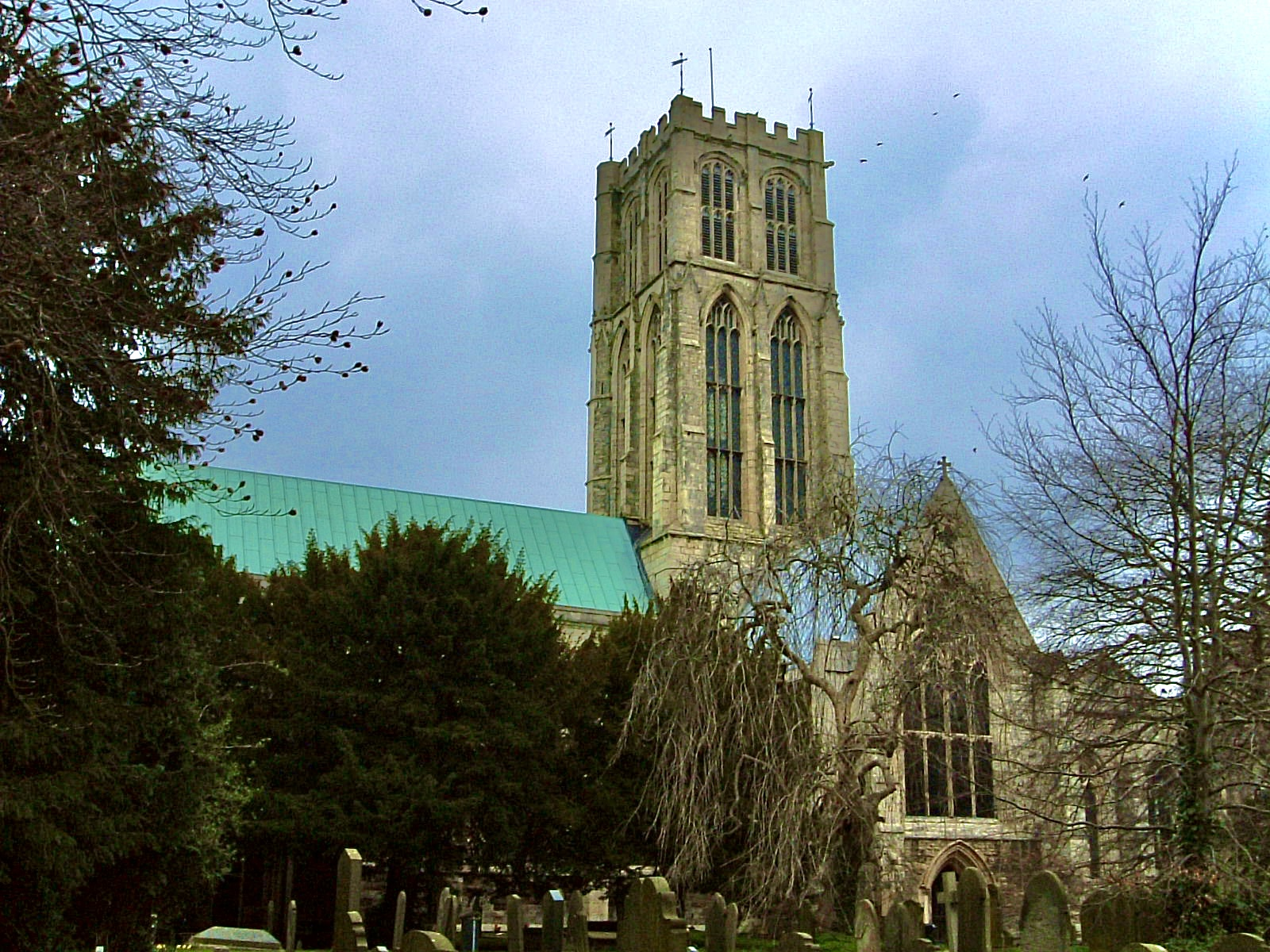
- Appointed: c. 1169
- Predecessor: Robert of Howden, father
- Successor: Peter Thebert
- Other post: Canon of Glasgow

Personal details
- Died: 1202

Roger of Howden or Hoveden (died 1202) was a 12th-century English chronicler, diplomat and head of the minster of Howden in the East Riding of Yorkshire.

== Roger and Howden minster ==
Roger was born to a clerical family linked to the ancient minster of St Peter of Howden, and succeeded his father Robert of Howden as its head, or persona. The date Roger was appointed to the minster by its patrons, the monks of Durham cathedral priory, has been located as around 1169. His title of 'magister' is evidence that he received an education at one of the greater schools of his day, as is also evident from his considerable literary output. Not long after succeeding his father he came into conflict with the lord of Howden and the surrounding district of Howdenshire, Bishop Hugh du Puiset of Durham. Bishop Hugh had made grants of tithes in Howdenshire to the hospital of Kepier in the city of Durham, ignoring the prior rights of the church of Howden. Roger pushed back with the assistance of the monks of the cathedral priory of Durham, the patrons of the minster, and eventually the bishop withdrew the grant. However, Bishop Hugh did not take the defeat lightly, and retaliated by attempting to remove Roger as minster head, alleging irregularities in his presentation to the post. The case went all the way to Rome and though Roger vindicated his appointment, relations between him and Bishop Hugh remained uneasy for the rest of his life.

== Courtier and diplomat ==
Most of Roger's public career was taken up in service to the Angevin kings of England. A good deal of his activity on behalf of Henry II can be reconstructed from his Gesta Henrici Secundi (Deeds of Henry II), which originated as a journal of his time in the royal court. From this can be found evidence that he accompanied the king's embassy to Pope Alexander in 1171, and in 1174 was sent from France on a secret mission to the lords of Galloway. In 1175 he appears as a negotiator between the king and a number of English religious houses. In 1180 and 1182–3 he was again at Rome as an English agent in the matter of the disputed election to the see of St Andrews in Scotland. Roger seems from these missions to have acquired a reputation as a reliable agent in ecclesiastical affairs and in Scotland and the borders in particular. He was employed on at least one occasion as a royal justice, serving in 1189 on the assize of the forests in the shires of Yorkshire, Cumberland and Northumberland. After Henry II's death in 1189 Roger continued in service to his successor, Richard I. In 1195 he was once again involved in a mission to Scotland, and by then his prominence had led to his acquisition of a canon's stall in Glasgow Cathedral.

== Roger and the Third Crusade ==
In 1189 Bishop Hugh du Puiset was appointed with the chancellor, William de Longchamp, by King Richard as joint justiciars to rule England in his absence. By this time Roger and he had a working relationship and Roger can be found accompanying the bishop in his household at the end of 1189 and then across to France. So he was a witness when Longchamp staged a violent coup against Bishop Hugh on his return to England in the early summer of 1190. The bishop was put under house arrest in his residence at Howden. Roger was rapidly commissioned to lead a covert mission to report the outrage to King Richard, who was still at the time in France. His part in the affair was revealed by the recent discovery of the journal of his voyage from Howden to Marseille in July 1190, where he successfully delivered the bishop's complaint to the king, along with a substantial bribe to get royal writs reversing Longchamp's coup. Rather than return to Howden, Roger joined the king's retinue and accompanied him to Sicily and Palestine, appearing with a group of fellow Yorkshiremen in a document drafted at the siege of Acre in 1191. Roger returned later that year with the fleet of Philip II of France and so did not accompany his own king on his disastrous return voyage.

== Death ==
Roger continued his work on his chronicle of England through to 1201, when he was deeply interested in the preaching mission of Abbot Eustace of Flay to England, and indeed records he went to York to hear him. Roger survived into the next year, for the process of appointing a successor to him at Howden minster was under way in September 1202, when rival candidates had begun lawsuits.

== Historical works ==
There are two chronicle texts associated with Roger, and though they are clearly related there has been a long academic debate as to whether he authored both. The earlier is the Gesta Henrici II et Gesta Regis Ricardi (Deeds of Henry II and King Richard). It runs from 1169 to 1192 and much of its content is repeated and revised in the Chronica magistri Rogeri de Hoveden (Chronicles of Master Roger of Howden) which offers the story of England before Henry II's reign as well as continuing on until 1201. The earlier text was formerly ascribed to Benedict of Peterborough but the only connection with him is that the abbot was sent by Roger a draft of the work up until 1177 apparently for his comment. Opinion is now that both works were by Roger and represent different stages of the evolution of the chronicle. It began in 1169 as a journal that he commenced when he joined the royal court. By 1177 Roger had developed ambitions for it and was reframing his Gesta as a more general chronicle of Angevin England. On his return to England in 1191 he decided that it would form the core of an English history, and he began the major revision that produced the Chronica. For English history before 1148 Roger used the text known as the Historia Saxonum sive Anglorum post obitum Bedae (History of the Saxons or English, following on from the death of Bede) which was drafted at Durham cathedral priory using the works of Henry of Huntingdon and Symeon of Durham. From 1148 to 1170 Roger used the Melrose Chronicle (edited for the Bannatyne Club in 1835 by Joseph Stevenson) and a collection of letters bearing upon the Thomas Becket controversy. He also employed material from his journal of the Third Crusade for the period 1190–1. As an author Howden is usually impersonal, and makes no pretence to literary style, quotes documents in full and adheres to the annalistic method. His chronology is tolerably exact. On foreign affairs and on questions of domestic policy he is very well informed. He abstracted himself entirely from his narrative even when he is known to have been present at what he was recording, as in the mission of 1190 to Marseille. This was clearly his idea as to how the author of a public history should conduct himself. Roger was not without prejudices, however. He disliked King Philip II of France, the enemy of his Angevin masters. He could not bring himself to say anything complimentary of Bishop Hugh du Puiset, whom he had reason to resent. He was outraged at and contemptuous of the impossible conduct of Archbishop Geoffrey of York, his diocesan bishop.

The Gesta Henrici Secundi contains the text of the Assize of Northampton.

== Other works ==
The discovery in the last decade of the twentieth century in French libraries of two manuscripts, which include three separate tracts that can be associated with Roger of Howden, has led to a re-evaluation of his intellectual interests and capacities. The largest of them is entitled De Viis Maris (On Sea Voyages) and its authorship by Roger is not in doubt. It clearly draws on the same material he used in his historical account of his mission to Marseille and voyage to Acre. It is a portolan of a voyage from a landing on the River Ouse near Howden to a transhipment point on the Humber and thence around England to Dartmouth. From there the author shipped around the Iberian peninsula to Marseille. He continued onward down the coast of Italy to Sicily and Messina. The author makes many geographical and historical digressions about seamarks, cities and personalities as he goes, with a clear interest in winds, vessels and expanses of water. Included with this are two other tracts, an Expositio Mappe Mundi (Explanation of the Mappa Mundi) and the Liber Nautarum (Book of Mariners). They echo the preoccupations of the De Viis Maris and form one collection with it, though they cannot conclusively be said to be by the same author. The De Viis Maris offers an insight into Roger's personality: a seasoned and sociable traveller, perpetually curious about his world and the cities and peoples he encountered in his extensive travels. The technical aspects of maritime and river transport were plainly a source of fascination to him, not surprisingly in an international diplomat and frequent traveller.

== Editions of Howden's works ==
- Gesta Regis Henrici Secundi et Gesta Regis Ricardi Benedicti abbatis (ed. William Stubbs) (2 vols., Rolls series, 1867), both volume 1 and volume 2 available at Gallica.
- Chronica (ed. William Stubbs) (4 vols., Rolls series, 1868–71), available at the Internet Archive here: vol 1, vol 2, vol 3, vol 4,
- Rogeri Hovedeni Annalium Pars Prior & Posterior, in Rerum Anglicarum Scriptores Post Bedam Praecipui, ex vetustissimis codicibus manuscriptis nunc primum in lucem editi (G. Bishop, R Nuberie & R. Barker Typographij Regii, London 1596). digitized (Google)
- De Viis Maris in, P.G. Dalché, Du Yorkshire à l'Inde: une «géographie» urbaine et maritime du xiie siècle, (Geneva: Droz, 2005), 173–229.

== Translations ==
- Henry T. Riley: The Annals of Roger de Hoveden: Comprising the History of England and of others Countries of Europe from A.D. 732 To A.D. 1201. London 1853, digitized: Vol. 1, vol. 2.

== Bibliography ==
- Frank Barlow, "Roger of Howden", English Historical Review, vol. 65 (1950).
- David Corner, "The Earliest Surviving Manuscripts of Roger of Howden's Chronica", English Historical Review, vol. 98 (1983).
- David Corner, "The Gesta Regis Henrici Secundi and Chronica of Roger, Parson of Howden", Bulletin of the Institute of Historical Research 56 (1983).
- David Crouch, 'At Home with Roger of Howden' in, Military Cultures and Martial Enterprises: Essays in Honour of Richard P. Abels, ed. J.D. Hosler and S. Isaac (Woodbridge: Boydell, 2020), 156–91.
- Davis, Henry William Carless (1911). "Roger of Hoveden" . Encyclopædia Britannica. Vol. 23 (11th ed.). pp. 454–455.
- John Gillingham, 'Roger of Howden on Crusade', in Medieval Historical Writing in the Christian and Islamic Worlds, ed. D.O. Morgan (London, 1982), 60–75.
- John Gillingham, 'The Travels of Roger of Howden and his Views of the Irish, Scots and Welsh,' Anglo-Norman Studies, XX (1997), 151–69.
- John Gillingham, 'Two Yorkshire Historians Compared: Roger of Howden and William of Newburgh,' Haskins Society Journal, 12 (2002), 15–37.
- John Gillingham, 'Writing the Biography of Roger of Howden' in, Writing Medieval Biography: Essays in Honour of Frank Barlow, ed. D. Bates, J. Crick and S. Hamilton (Woodbridge: Boydell, 2006), 211–16.
- D. M. Stenton, "Roger of Howden and Benedict", English Historical Review, 68 (1953).
- Lucas Villegas Aristizabal, "Revisión de las crónicas de Ralph de Diceto y de la Gesta regis Ricardi sobre la participación de la flota angevina durante la Tercera Cruzada en Portugal", Studia Historica- Historia Medieval 27 (2009), pp. 153–170.
