= Grand Assize =

The Grand Assize (or Assize of Windsor) was a legal instrument set up in 1179 by King Henry II of England, to allow tenants to transfer disputes over land from feudal courts to the royal court.

== Origins ==
Given the capacity of feudal justice for delay, and the arbitrariness of its methods of judgement (duel, ordeal), 12th C England had ample room for an alternative method of settling property disputes; and Henry II – acclaimed by Walter Map as one "clever in devising new and undiscovered legal procedure" – saw in the Grand Assize a means of preserving social order, avoiding the violence of self-help in the countryside, and at the same time of increasing royal revenue at the same time through the judicial system.

'Glanville' in his legal treatise termed the Grand Assize a "royal benefit...by this means men may escape the severe punishment of an unexpected and premature death.... For whilst the duel proceeds on the evidence of one juror, this assize requires the oaths of at least twelve lawful men". At the same time, "the assize does not allow as many essoins as the duel". Under the new procedure, four knights picked by the sheriff had to select a jury of twelve knights to declare (from local knowledge) the better right in the land in question - an important step in the ultimate development of the jury.

== Development ==
From land, the Grand Assize was extended to cover such things as mills and local services as well. However, the Assize of novel disseisin, originally designed only to settle possession or seissen, gradually came to displace the Grand Assize in questions of right as well, as a swifter process; and by 1202 the majority of cases at the Grand Assize were being decided by compromise.

== See also ==
- Assize of Clarendon
- Assize of mort d'ancestor
- History of trial by jury in England
