= 1110s in England =

Events from the 1110s in England.

== Incumbents ==
- Monarch – Henry I

== Events ==
- 1110
  - Roger of Salisbury creates the exchequer as a separate governmental department.
  - Royal park at Woodstock walled to allow for hunting and keeping exotic animals.
- 1111
  - Robert of Bellême leads a rebellion in Normandy; Henry I launches a military campaign in response.
- 1112
  - Robert of Bellême captured, ending the rebellion.
  - Count of Anjou agrees to do homage to Henry I.
- 1113
  - Treaty of Gisors: France recognises English rule over Maine and Brittany.
  - Scottish noble David, Prince of the Cumbrians, marries Anglo-Saxon heiress Maud, Countess of Huntingdon.
- 1114
  - 7 January – Matilda, daughter of Henry I, marries Henry V, Holy Roman Emperor.
  - April – Ralph d'Escures enthroned as Archbishop of Canterbury.
  - Summer – Henry I invades Wales.
  - Roger of Salisbury introduces the first pipe rolls, as a record of exchequer accounts.
- 1115
  - Henry I creates his nephew Stephen count of Mortain in Normandy.
- 1116
  - Henry I launches a military campaign against France, Anjou, and Flanders.
  - A fire destroys Peterborough Cathedral.
- 1117
  - 3 May – Merton Priory in Surrey is consecrated.
- 1118
  - Peace with Flanders agreed.
  - Reconstruction of Peterborough Cathedral begins.
- 1119
  - June – Henry I's son, William Adelin, marries Matilda of Anjou, securing peace with Anjou.
  - 20 August – Henry I defeats Louis VI of France at the Battle of Bremule in Normandy, ending the campaign in France.
  - 19 September – A severe earthquake hits Gloucestershire and Warwickshire.
  - Robert de Brus, 1st Lord of Annandale, founds Gisborough Priory and grants the church of St Hilda of "Middleburg" (Middlesbrough) to Whitby Abbey.
  - Construction of Leeds Castle (Kent) in stone begins.

== Births ==
- 1110
  - Aelred of Rievaulx, abbot (died 1167)
- 1111
  - Henry of Blois, bishop of Winchester (died 1171)
  - Josceline de Bohon, religious leader (died 1184)
- 1115
  - Gilbert de Clare, 2nd Earl of Hertford (died 1153)
- 1116
  - Roger de Clare, 3rd Earl of Hertford (died 1173)
- 1118
  - 21 December – Thomas Becket, Archbishop of Canterbury (died 1170)

== Deaths ==
- 1118
  - 1 May – Matilda of Scotland, Queen of Henry I (born c. 1080, Scotland)
  - 5 June – Robert de Beaumont, 1st Earl of Leicester, (born 1049, Normandy)
- 1119
  - 20 June – Henry de Beaumont, 1st Earl of Warwick
