= Statutes Fair =

Amusement fair in England

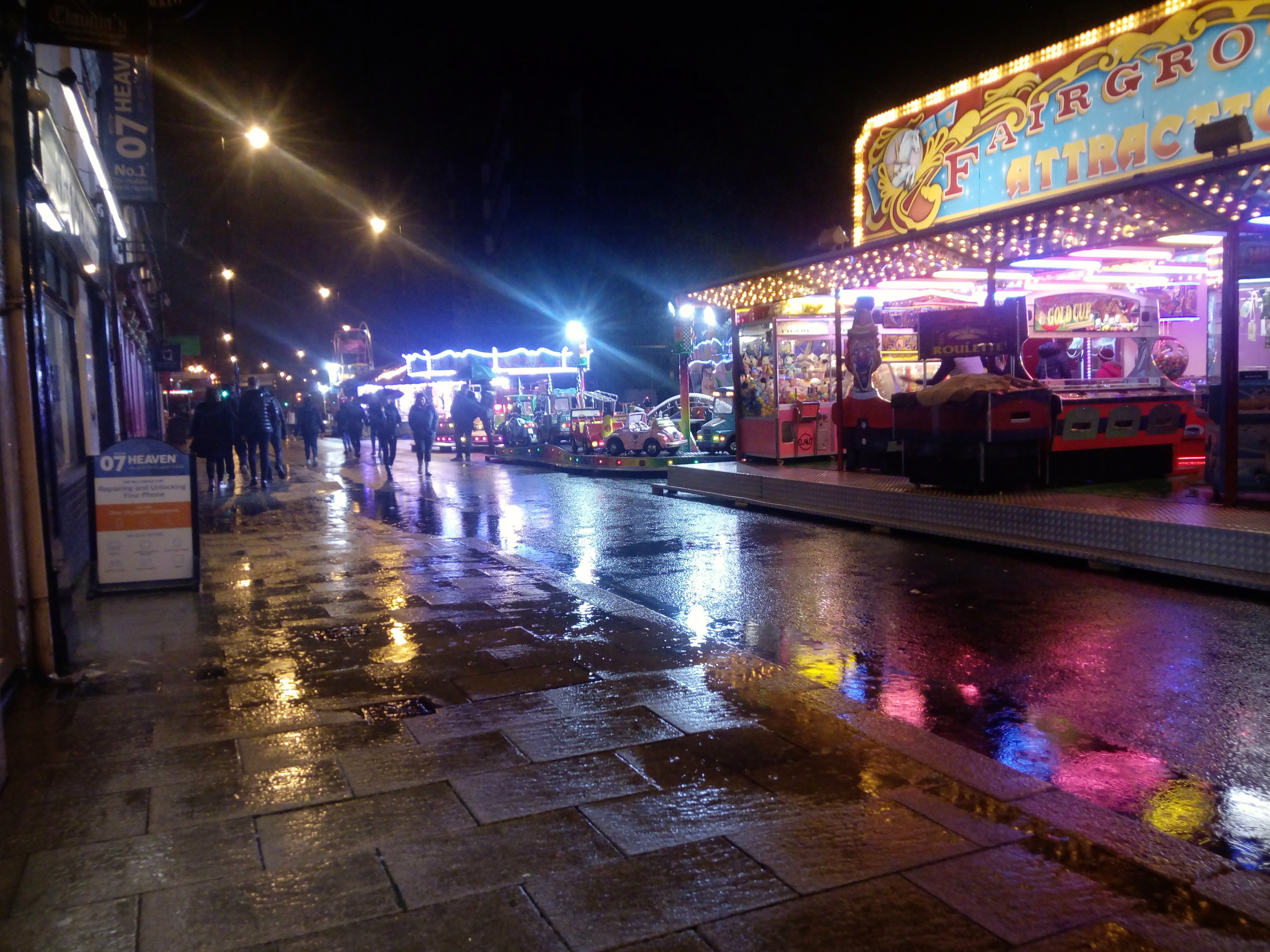
New Street during the fair 2008

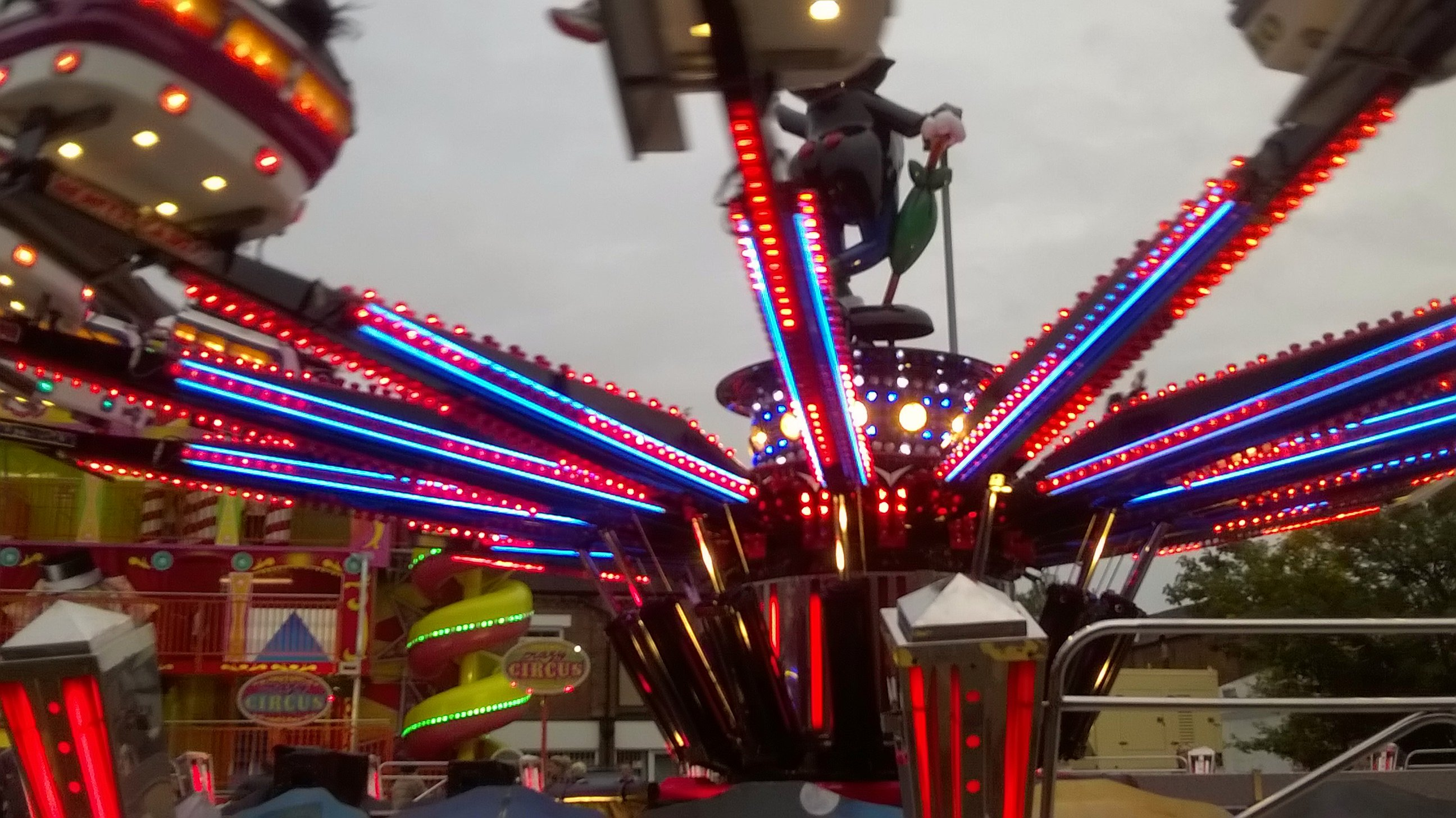
A fair ride, 2008

The Statutes Fair is an amusements fair held in Burton upon Trent, Staffordshire in England. It is held annually on the first Monday and Tuesday after Michaelmas. The fair has been held since 1219 but, despite its name, no statute allowing for it has been found. The event was originally a hiring fair, with employers giving a symbolic shilling to employees contracted for the following year. Amusement stalls began as a means of persuading the employees to spend their shillings. The event is now entirely an amusements fair. It has survived several attempts at abolition and ran, in a reduced form, through the Second World War and COVID-19 pandemic.

== Description ==
The Statutes Fair is a funfair held for two days in the streets of Burton upon Trent. It begins on the first Monday after Michaelmas, meaning it usually starts in early October. In modern times it is held in the market place and the nearby streets, including High Street, Lichfield Street and New Street. The roads and some car parks and bus stops are closed by the local authority, East Staffordshire Borough Council, from Sunday to Wednesday to facilitate setting up and removal of the rides and street cleaning. The fair consists of dozens of rides and sideshows and attracts thousands of attendees. It is currently provided by Pat Collins Funfairs who have been associated with fairs in the town for more than a century. A similar fair, the Ashby Statutes Fair, is also provided by Pat Collins in nearby Ashby de la Zouch over five days each September.

Locals pronounce the name of the fair as "stat-chits", rather than the typical pronunciation of "statutes".

== History ==
The Statutes Fair has been held annually since 1219. The fair is sometimes attributed to an order by King John (who reigned 1199–1216), but the fair he granted by statute, noted for its cheese and horse sales, was held on the eve of St Modwen's feast day, so on 29 October. John also granted Burton the right to hold its weekly Thursday market. Other fairs in the town were granted by statute of Henry III (reigned 1216–1272), including one on Ascension Day (the fortieth day of Easter), one on Candlemas Day (2 February) and a cattle and horse fair on 5 April. Despite its name, no statute was granted for the Statutes Fair. Local historian and former Burton Mail editor Joe Woodford said this was ironic "with typical Burton awkwardness ... we ignore all the fairs that were granted to us and make a splash on a fair that is not a fair in the accepted sense".

The Statutes Fair is thought to be a relic from the Great Court of the Abbot of Burton, which was held on Michaelmas (29 September). The fair was originally a hiring fair for households to hire and fire servants, and industries to take on labourers. A contract would be reached between employer and employee to fix wages for the following year. Employers customarily gathered in the yards of the George Hotel and White Hart Hotel in the High Street where contracts were formally sealed with employees by the payment of a symbolic shilling. Prospective employees wore their best clothing and carried an item that denoted their trade. Those who found employment wore red, white or blue ribbons in their caps. Some amusement stalls began to appear at the fair to entice employees to spend their contract shilling; gradually the event became entirely an amusements fair.

In 1892 locals submitted a petition calling for the fair to be relocated—or even cancelled outright—but this was unsuccessful. As of 1896, the fair still operated as a hiring fair, at which "young lads" could be hired for £4 or higher and pay for "maid servants" started at £8. During the Second World War the main fair was cancelled because of blackout regulations but continuity was provided by setting up a "blackout tent" containing a small number of rides. The Statutes Fair came under threat during the 1960s redevelopment of the town centre. The local authority (which was then Burton upon Trent County Borough) found it had the power to dissolve the fair, but not to relocate it. To safeguard the event, the authority provided an assurance that the market square would never be built on and adjusted the redevelopment to allow the fair to continue. In 1962 a customary half-day holiday which allowed school children in the town to attend the fair was abolished at the instigation of a prominent local head teacher. In 2005 a committee of East Staffordshire Borough Council considered scrapping or moving the fair, but decided against. In 2020 the main fair was cancelled because of the COVID-19 pandemic, but a single ride was set up in the market place to ensure the continuity of the fair was not broken.
