= History of trial by jury in England =

The history of trial by jury in England is influential because many English and later British colonies adopted the English common law system in which trial by jury plays an important part.

== Anglo-Saxon England ==
According to George Macaulay Trevelyan in A Shortened History of England (1958), during the Viking occupation:

The Scandinavians, when not on the Viking warpath, were a litigious people and loved to get together in the 'thing' to hear legal argument. They had no professional lawyers, but many of their farmer-warriors, like Njal, the truth-teller, were learned in folk custom and in its intricate judicial procedure. A Danish town in England often had, as its principal officers, twelve hereditary 'law men'. The Danes introduced the habit of making committees among the free men in court, which perhaps made England favorable ground for the future growth of the jury system out of a Frankish custom later introduced by the Normans.

The English king Æthelred the Unready issued a legal code at Wantage, which states that the twelve leading thegns (minor nobles) of each wapentake (a small district) were required to swear that they would investigate crimes without bias. These 'juries' differed from the present-day kind by being self-informing; instead of getting information through a trial, the jurors were required to investigate the case themselves.

== Later Middle Ages ==
In the 12th century, Henry II took a major step in developing the jury system. Henry set up a system to resolve land disputes using juries. A jury of twelve free men were assigned to arbitrate in these disputes. Unlike the modern jury, these men were charged with uncovering the facts of the case on their own rather than listening to arguments in court. Henry also introduced what is now known as the "grand jury", through his Grand Assize. Under the assize, a jury of free men was charged with reporting any crimes that they knew of in their hundred to a "justice in eyre", a judge who moved between hundreds on a circuit. A criminal accused by this jury was given a trial by ordeal. Under the jury, the chances of being found guilty were much lower, as the king did not choose verdict (or punishment).

The Church banned participation of clergy in trial by ordeal in 1215. Without the legitimacy of religion, trial by ordeal collapsed. The juries under the assizes began deciding guilt as well as providing accusations. The same year, trial by jury became a fairly explicit right in one of the most influential clauses of Magna Carta, signed by King John. Article 39 of Magna Carta reads (translated by Lysander Spooner in his Essay on the Trial by Jury (1852)):

No free man shall be captured or imprisoned or disseised of his freehold or of his liberties, or of his free customs, or be outlawed or exiled or in any way destroyed, nor will we proceed against him by force or proceed against him by arms, but by the lawful judgment of his peers or by the law of the land.

Although the charter says "or by the law of the land", this in no manner can be interpreted as if it were enough to have a positive law, made by the king, to be able to proceed legally against a subject. The law of the land was the consuetudinary law, based on the customs and consent of King John's subjects and, since there was no Parliament in those times, neither the king nor the barons could make a law without the consent of the people. According to some sources, in the time of Edward III, "by the law of the land" had been substituted "by due process of law", which in those times was a trial by twelve peers.

During the mid-14th century, it was forbidden that persons who had sat on the presenting jury (i.e., in modern parlance, the grand jury) should also sit on the trial jury for that crime. Medieval juries were self-informing, in that individuals were chosen as jurors because they either knew the parties and the facts, or they had the duty to discover them. This spared the government the cost of fact-finding. Over time, English juries became less self-informing and relied more on the trial itself for information on the case. Jurors remained free to investigate cases on their own until the 17th century. Magna Carta being forgotten after a succession of benevolent reigns (or, more probably, reigns limited by the jury and the barons, and only under the rule of laws that the juries and barons found acceptable), the kings, through the royal judges, began to extend their control over the jury and the kingdom.

David Hume in his 1778 History of England tells something of the powers that the kings had accumulated in the times after Magna Carta, the prerogatives of the crown and the sources of great power with which these monarchs counted:

One of the most ancient and most established instruments of power was the court of Star Chamber, which possessed an unlimited discretionary authority of fining, imprisoning, and inflicting corporal punishment, and whose jurisdiction extended to all sorts of offences, contempts, and disorders, that lay not within reach of the common law. The members of this court consisted of the privy council and the judges; men who all of them enjoyed their offices during pleasure: And when the prince himself was present, he was the sole judge, and all the others could only interpose with their advice. There needed but this one court in any government, to put an end to all regular, legal, and exact plans of liberty. For who durst set himself in opposition to the crown and ministry, or aspire to the character of being a patron of freedom, while exposed to so arbitrary a jurisdiction? I much question, whether any of the absolute monarchies in Europe contain, at present, so illegal and despotic a tribunal. While so many terrors hung over the people, no jury durst have acquitted a man, when the court was resolved to have him condemned. The practice also, of not confronting witnesses to the prisoner, gave the crown lawyers all imaginable advantage against him. And, indeed, there scarcely occurs an instance, during all these reigns, that the sovereign, or the ministers, were ever disappointed in the issue of a prosecution. Timid juries, and judges who held their offices during pleasure, never failed to second all the views of the crown. And as the practice was anciently common of fining, imprisoning, or otherwise punishing the jurors, merely at the discretion of the court, for finding a verdict contrary to the direction of these dependent judges; it is obvious, that juries were then no manner of security to the liberty of the subject.

== Early modern period ==
The first paragraph of the Act that abolished the Star Chamber, long a bone of contention between the early Stuart kings and a significant fraction of their subjects, on 5 July 1641 repeats the clause on the right of a citizen to be judged by his peers:

Abolition of the Star Chamber

An act for the regulating of the privy council, and for taking away the court commonly called the star-chamber.

WHEREAS by the great charter many times confirmed in parliament, it is enacted, That no freeman shall be taken or imprisoned, or disseised of his freehold or liberties, or free customs, or be outlawed or exiled or otherwise destroyed, and that the King will not pass upon him, or condemn him; but by lawful judgment of his peers, or by the law of the land ...

Many English colonies, including the Thirteen Colonies, which later became the United States, adopted the jury trial system.

In 1670 two Quakers charged with unlawful assembly, William Penn and William Mead, were found not guilty at the Central Criminal Court at the Old Bailey by a jury. The judge then imprisoned the jury without food, water, heat, or light, saying "I will have a positive verdict or you'll starve for it". They refused to give way, and the judge fined them and returned them to prison, until released when the Lord Chief Justice interceded, saying that a judge "may try to open the eyes of jurors, but not to lead them by the nose". Penn and Meade remained in prison; despite the verdict of not guilty of the original charges, they had not removed their hats in court. Edward Bushel, a member of the jury, took out a writ to free Penn and Meade. The trial is referred to as Bushel's Case, and is a landmark case that established beyond question the independence of the jury in the English legal system. There is a plaque on the wall of the Old Bailey to this effect, praising the courage and endurance of Bushel and the other jurymen.

== Women on the jury ==
Women first served on trial juries in England in 1920, following the passage of the Sex Disqualification (Removal) Act 1919. Far fewer women than men served on juries even after 1920, although the extent of the difference could change from one court to another. At the Central Criminal Court (the Old Bailey), which heard the most serious trials in the country, the average jury seated between 1923 and 1926 included between 2.0 and 2.5 women. At the provincial Assize courts, which heard similar trials to the Old Bailey, but outside London, the numbers of women serving were regionally variable, although there were generally more women serving in the Midlands than in the South of the country. At the local Quarter Sessions courts, which tried minor offences such as theft, the percentage of women on the jury throughout the 1920s and 1930s has been observed at between 10 and 25% in various towns. At Leicester, where records have not survived recording which people actually sat on Quarter Sessions juries, the percentage of jurors summoned who were women consistently stood at around 50% throughout the period between the two World Wars.

Feminist campaigners identified three main reasons why women continued in most places to be less well represented on juries than men. First, lawyers could challenge any juror in a serious trial, removing them without cause. Second, judges were granted a power under the 1919 Act to order single-sex juries. Third, a person only qualified for jury service if they were named as the formal owner or occupier of a property. All three of these aspects of jury service were felt to disproportionately exclude women, and organised opposition to these rules continued until the eventual abolition of the property qualifications in the 1970s. As Logan notes, this fifty-year campaign constituted an important link between the first wave feminism of the suffrage campaign, and the second wave feminism of the 1970s.

More recent historical work has shown how the property qualifications did serve to exclude many women from jury service, as these feminist campaigning groups had argued. Ten towns had been formally exempted from observing the property qualifications, which had led in several towns in the Midlands to a practice of empanelling juries of six women and six men. From 1921, these towns were required to observe the property qualifications which applied elsewhere, and these ten towns immediately stopped having equal representation of men and women on their Assize juries. But other work has called into question the significance of challenges to individual jurors by the parties' lawyers, and of judges ordering single-sex juries. Across a range of jurisdictions surveyed throughout the 1920s and 1930s, the gender composition of the set of people summoned was a close match to the composition of the people actually seated on a jury. Crosby has concluded that the most significant element in determining how many women undertook jury service was therefore the series of decisions local officials took about who to summon in the first place.
