= Job fair =

Event used to give information to potential employees

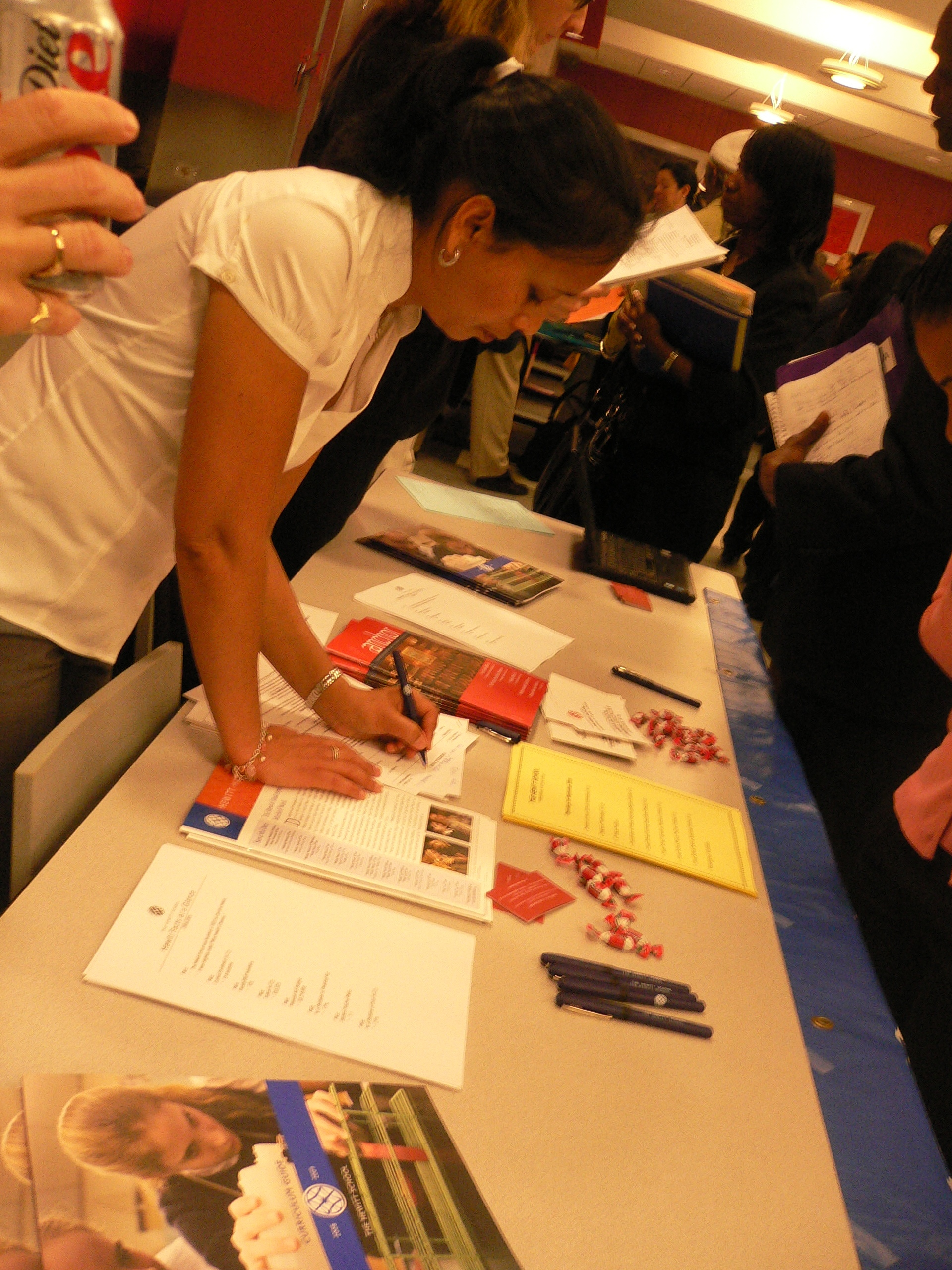
A job fair in New York City, March 2009

A job fair, also commonly referred to as a job expo or career fair or career expo, is an event in which employers, recruiters, and schools give information to potential employees. Job seekers attend job fairs to speak face-to-face with potential employers, fill out résumés, and ask questions about the various positions available. In addition to in-person events, online job fairs give job seekers a virtual way to get in contact with possible employers.

== In-person ==
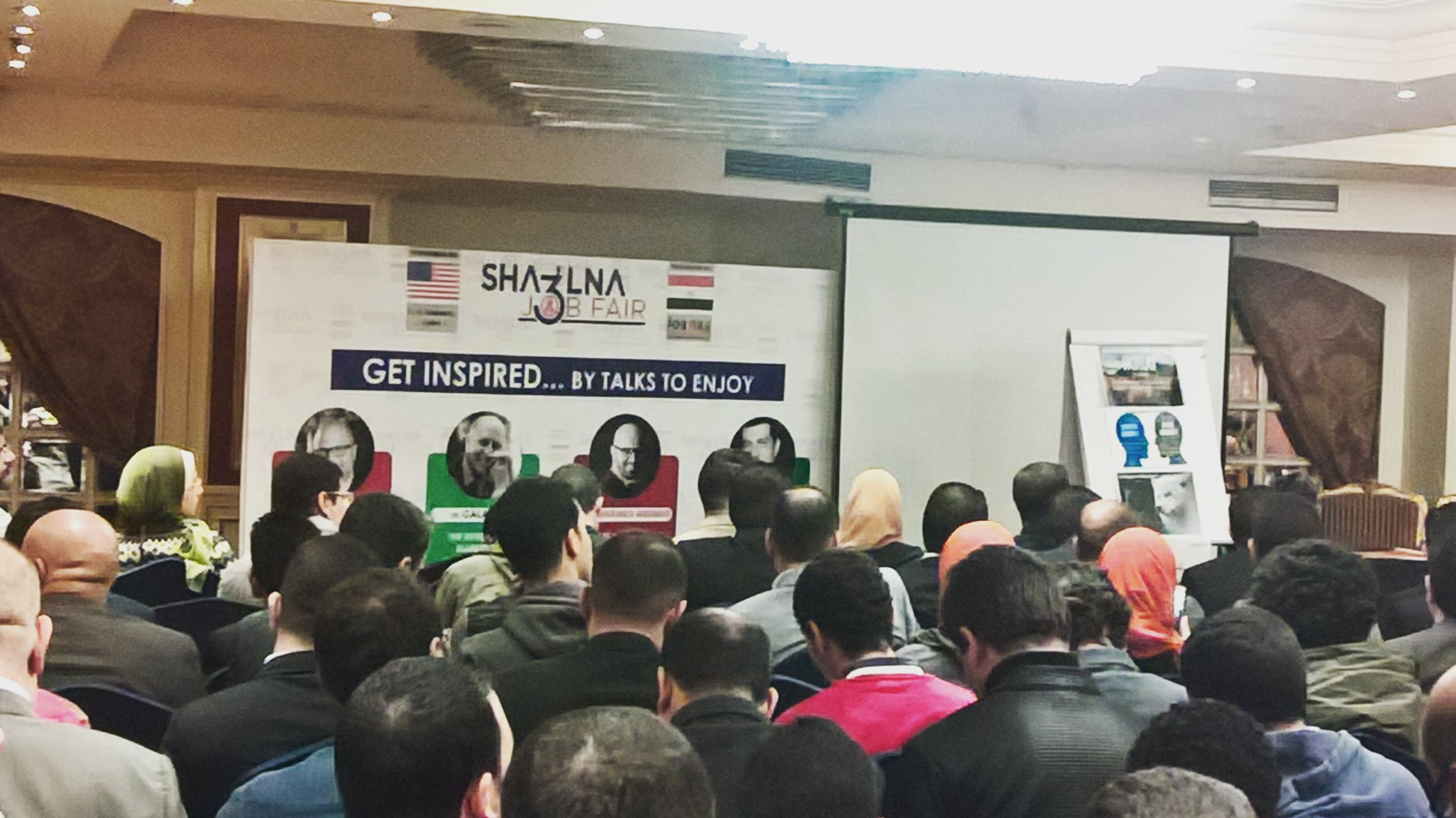
Job fair in Egypt (2019).

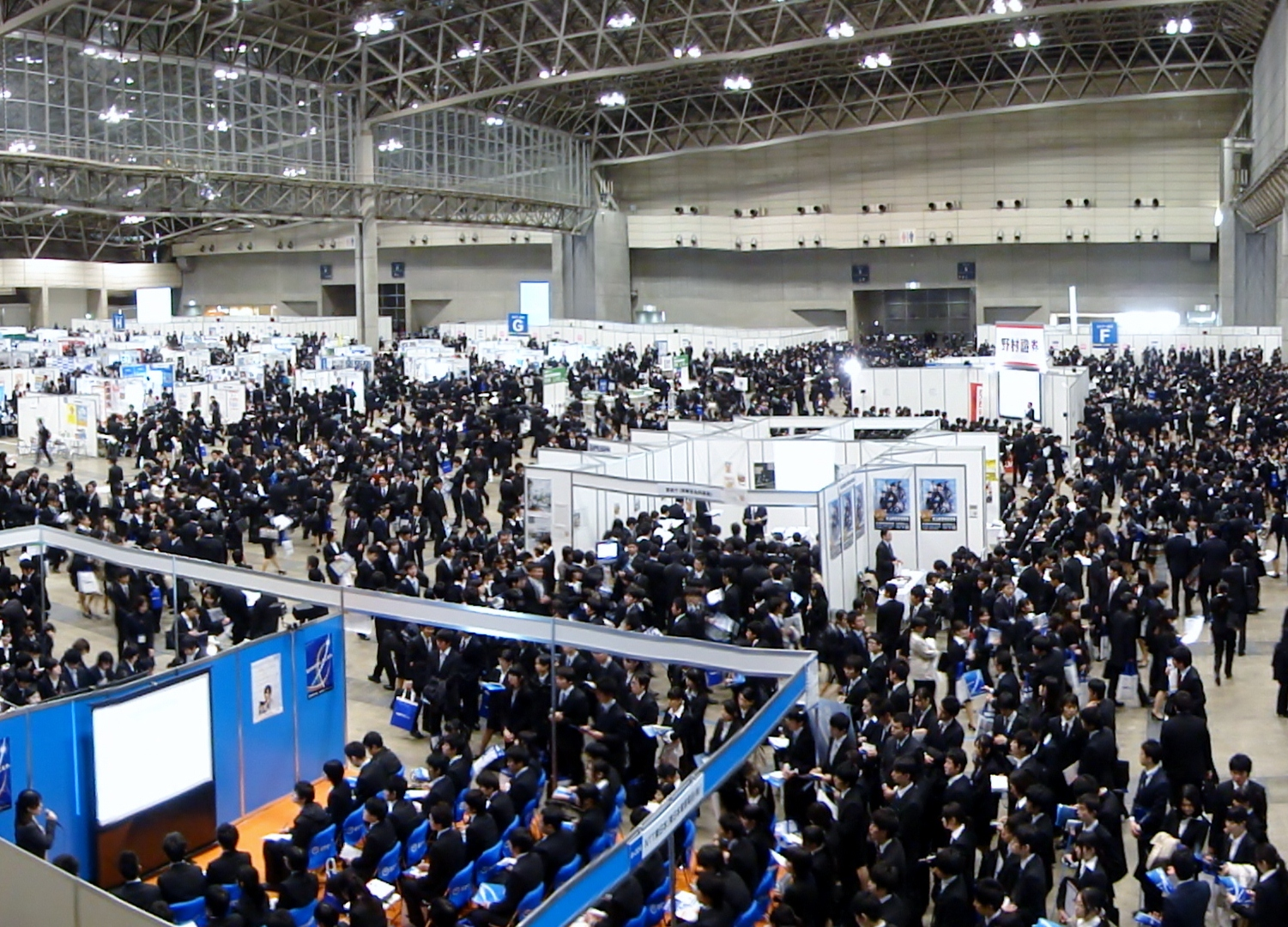
Job fair in Japan

In colleges, job fairs are commonly used for entry-level job recruitment. Job seekers use this opportunity to meet with an employer, attempt to stand out from other applicants, and get an overview of what it is like to work for a company or a sector that seems interesting to the applicant.

Career expositions usually include company or organization tables or booths where resumes can be collected and business cards can be exchanged. Often sponsored by career centers, job fairs provide a centralized location for students to meet employers and perform first interviews. Hiring companies speak with students about expectations and answer questions, such as the degree or work experience needed for certain positions.

== Online job fairs ==
Online job fairs are held through a virtual platform which allows employers to speak with potential employees. Depending on the platform used, a virtual career fair may include services such as video, live chats, downloadable material and more. After having applied online to positions, people may also try their luck with in-person job fairs.

== See also ==
- Hiring and mop fairs
