= Inquest of Sheriffs =

Commission held by King Henry II of England

The Inquest of Sheriffs was a commission held by King Henry II of England in 1170 into the conditions of local government in England.

== Background ==
In early Angevin England, sheriffs played an important part in local government, representing the Crown, keeping the peace, running the operations of the county and royal hundred courts and managing summons and similar legal orders. They usually managed the royal manors in their shire, collecting the rents and spending money locally on the Crown's behalf. They were typically members of the local baronage, but were appointed by the king, and they expected to make a profit from their office.

== Inquest ==
In 1170, King Henry II, who ruled over a network of lands across Europe, returned to England after several years of absence. He promptly established a commission to examine any malpractices in local government, which became known as the Inquest of the Sheriffs. The inquiry was widespread, extending not just to the King's sheriffs but to other royal officers, and even to the financial practices of the leaders of the clergy, the barons and burgesses in the towns. A series of local circuits were established, and the commissioners (in a contemporary's words) required “all the men of the realm, including earls, barons, knights, freeholders and even villeins in every shire to...give true testimony concerning the things of which the sheriffs and their men had deprived them”.

== Outcome ==
By the end of the year, 21 out of the 26 sheriffs in England had been dismissed from office. Of those retained, the majority were not barons, but members of the royal household; while sixteen of the new sheriffs chosen were already employees of the Exchequer.

The sweeping changes undermined the links between the local barons and the office of sheriffs, leaving the majority of holders as ministeriales. Henry also increased the role of travelling royal judges in the court system, and increasingly the role of sheriff became one of a local official whose purpose was to represent the royal bureaucracy and assist the judges when they visited, rather than acting as an independent power in their own right.

== Surviving returns ==
Unfortunately only two partial returns from the Inquest survive, one detailing payments to the Earl of Arundel in East Anglia, for such things as the aid for the marriage of Henry's daughter; the other payments to the sheriff from the borough of Worcester for the farm, for conveying prisoners, and for the royal marriage.

== See also ==
Assize of Clarendon

== Bibliography ==
- Musson, Anthony (2001). Medieval Law in Context: The Growth of Legal Consciousness from Magna Carta to the Peasants' Revolt. Manchester, UK: Manchester University Press. ISBN 978-0-719-05494-5.
- Warren, W. L. (2000). Henry II (Yale ed.). New Haven, U.S.: Yale University Press. ISBN 978-0-300-08474-0.
