= Beaulieu v Finglam =

British court case

- Court: Court of King's Bench
- Citations: (1401) B & M 557

Keywords
- Tort, duty of care, fire

Beaulieu v Finglam (1401) is a landmark and precedent setting case in English tort law. While specifically it set strict liability for the escape of fire, the judgment also demarcated the limits of responsibility and liability for tort cases. It also established the first ratio of what would become duty of care. Though a duty of care with regard to water and animals had already been established.

== Judgment ==
‘A man is held to answer for the act of his servant or of his guest ... for if my servant or my guest [accidentally] ... burns all my house and the house of my neighbour also, in this case I shall answer to my neighbour for his damage ... But if a man from outside my house and against my will starts a fire .... whereby my house is burned and my neighbours’ houses are burned as well, for this I shall not be held bound to them; for this cannot be said to be done by wrong on my part, but is against my will.’

— Beaulieu v Finglam: 1401 B & M 557

== See also ==
- English tort law
