= Assize (Scotland) =

Assize is a word sometimes used in Scots law to mean a trial by jury.
