= Assize of mort d'ancestor =

English land inheritance legal action

In English law, the assize of mort d'ancestor ("death of ancestor") was an action brought where a plaintiff claimed the defendant had entered upon a freehold belonging to the plaintiff following the death of one of his relatives. The questions submitted to the jury were, "was A seised in his demesne as of fee on the day whereon he died?" and "Is the plaintiff his next heir?" This assize enabled the heir to obtain possession, even though some other person might have a better right to the land than the deceased.

== Origins, development and end ==
Mort d'ancestor was one of the so-called "petty assizes" established by Henry II in the wake of the Assize of Clarendon (1166) and the Assize of Northampton (1176). According to the Assize of Northampton, the lord must not prevent the heir having seisin forthwith on the ancestor's death, making this almost the final step in the development of common law heritability: "4. Item, if any freeholder had died, let his heirs remain possessed of such 'seisin' as their father had. ... And according to the result of the inquest let restitution be made to his heirs".

Doris Stenton has argued however that it was only some time after the Assize of Northampton that the (purchasable) writ of mort d'ancestor itself was introduced, allowing individuals to seek justice for themselves in the royal courts (as opposed to the general enquiries of the two main Assizes). Whereas Northampton was mainly concerned with lords preventing heirs taking seisin, the new writ also covered the case of competing heirs to the same property.

Like the other petty assizes, the new writ was immediately popular, being quicker, cheaper and simpler than feudal justice; and like them too it gradually developed from a preliminary to a final action, while the range of relations who could claim heritage was also widened (in the 13th century) from close to far.

With the other two petty assizes, it was abolished in 1833.

== Examples ==
Ranulf de Glanvill's Treatise on the Laws and Customs of the Kingdom of England give several examples of mort d'ancestor writs, which were issued to a sheriff as a command from the king. The general form was:

- The sheriff shall, upon receiving security from the plaintiff, summon twelve local men to testify in the king's court,
  - whether the plaintiff's relative held the land as a heritable estate ("was seised in his demesne as of his fee"),
  - whether the relative died after the king's coronation, and
  - whether the plaintiff was his heir.
- Before their court appearance, these witnesses should view the land and sign their names on the writ.
- The sheriff shall also summon the defendant or his representative to hear the testimony.

Two early instances of such an action are recorded in feet of fine from the reign of King John for a family dispute between members of the de Brantingham family in Yorkshire in 1202. On 22 August 1202, one Matilda (or Maud), daughter of John de Brantingham, brought an action under the assize of mort d'ancestor against her sisters, Mary and Alice de Brantingham. Less than four months later, on 1 December 1202, John de Brantingham, son of Haldane the Deacon (and not to be confused with the later John de Brantingham, a Yorkshire clergyman), brought a similar action against his three daughters.

In Ireland in the early 1300s John de Cogan succeeded in a claim for assize of mort d'ancestor before a Bench of judges headed by the Lord Chancellor of Ireland. From the surviving records of the lawsuit the land in dispute seems to have been a substantial wooded area in Maynooth.

Most such actions were in fact for very small areas of land, a few furlongs or a handful of acres.

== See also ==
- Assize of novel disseisin
- Assize of darrein presentment
- Grand Assize

== Bibliography ==
- Surtees Society (1897), Pedes finium ebor. regnante Johanne, AD MCXIX – AD MCCXIV, Publications of the Surtees Society, vol. 94, Durham: Andrews and Co. and others.
