= Essoin =

Excuse for not appearing in court

In old English law, an essoin (/ɪˈsɔɪn/, /ɛˈsɔɪn/, Anglo-Norman, from Old French: essoignier, "to excuse") is an excuse for nonappearance in court. Essoining is the seeking of the same. The person sent to deliver the excuse to the court is an essoiner or essoineur.

There were several kinds of essoins in common law in the Middle Ages:

- An essoin de malo lecti, the "excuse of the bed of sickness", was an excuse that the person was too ill to get out of bed, and was generally only invoked in civil actions involving real property. This required that the invoker be observed in bed by a commission of four knights.
- An essoin de ultra mare, the "excuse of being overseas" (literally "beyond the sea"), was an excuse that the person was abroad. The only resultant delay to litigation permissible for this excuse was enough time for word to be sent to the person and for them to return to England ("forty days and one ebb and one flood" being a conventional formula), and the excuse could only be invoked once, at the start of litigation.
- An essoin de servicio (or per servitium) regis, the "excuse of the King's service", was the excuse that the person concerned was in the King's service at the time and thus unavailable. It required the production of the King's writ of service for proof. By the Statute of Essoins 1318 (12 Edw. 2. Stat. 2), women (with a few exceptions) could not make this excuse.
- An essoin de malo veniendi, the "excuse of becoming ill en route", was the excuse that the person had fallen ill on the way to court. It originally required either some form of proof from the messenger who carried word that the person had fallen ill, or the sworn testimony of the person concerned that he had been ill once he finally arrived at court. However, during the 13th century these requirements gradually came to be waived, and even considered to be oppressive.

Essoins were originally received at court on essoin day, the first day of the term of the court. However, by 11 Geo. 4 and 1 Will. 4, essoin days were abolished. Essoins, and the day to which proceedings had as a result been adjourned, would be entered on an essoin roll.

== Sources ==
- Ranulf de Glanville and John Beames (1812). Translation of Glanville. London: W. Reed. pp. 7–36.
- Henry of Bratton (1210–1268). Bracton: De Legibus Et Consuetudinibus Angliæ (Bracton on the Laws and Customs of England). pp. 72–91.
