= Assize of Clarendon =

1166 act of Henry II of England

The Assize of Clarendon was an act of Henry II of England in 1166 that began a transformation of English law and led to trial by jury in common law countries worldwide, and that established assize courts.

Prior systems for deciding the winning party in a case, especially felonies, included trial by ordeal, trial by battle, or trial by compurgation (trial by oath), in which evidence, inspection, and inquiry was made under oath by laymen, knights or ordinary freemen. After the Assize of Clarendon trial by jury developed, though some historians say beginnings of the jury system predate this act. The Assize of Clarendon did not lead to this change immediately; recourse to trial by combat was not officially rescinded until 1819 in the aftermath of the murder of Mary Ashford.

The assize takes its name from Clarendon Palace, Wiltshire, the royal hunting lodge at which it was promulgated.

== Problems addressed by the assize ==
In 1154, Henry II inherited the throne of a troubled England. In full swing were the Crusades, a military endeavour that kept noble landowners away from their castles for years at a time. Unoccupied and unclaimed land invited squatters; since there was no central recording office for real property in England at the time, and sorting out who owned what fief was entrusted to human memory, disputes arose when aristocrats returned or died thousands of miles from home.

Another, even more, serious was the aftermath of The Anarchy, a disastrous civil war between King Stephen and the Empress Matilda. The two factions had hired mercenary soldiers, and when there was no one left to pay them, many resorted to robbery and other forms of violence as a profession. Crime followed the breakdown of the local authority. The quarrel between the King and the Empress created more property troubles; as communities were divided, both factions were happy to reward their supporters with the lands of the local opponents.

Finally, there was the long-standing difficulty involving the Catholic Church, which culminated in the murder of Thomas Becket, the Archbishop of Canterbury. The problem for the King was that the Church acted like an imperium in imperio, a "kingdom within a kingdom", only partially, if at all, subject to Henry's laws. The church operated its own court system, which answered not to Henry but to the Pope; it was a large landowner and a powerful vested interest. Henry wished to establish a system of justice that would enlarge the power of the Crown at the expense of the clergy.

== The assizes ==
Henry, therefore, promulgated various assizes (i.e. courts that convened in a town periodically, rather than being permanently established). The primary and most general one, the Assize of Clarendon was issued in 1166. Others, the "petty" assizes known respectively as the assize of novel disseisin, of mort d'ancestor, and of darrein presentment gave more specific relief. The most popular one became the assize of novel disseisin, which in Law French meant something close to the "assize of recent dispossession". Those who had been recently put out of their lands could recover the beneficial use of them by resorting to this assize, which led to a then-innovative method of trial. Twelve "of the more lawful men" of the locality were summoned by the king's sheriff to determine, upon their own knowledge, who was entitled to the property. This innovative method of proceeding, the origin of the civil petit jury at common law, was aimed at the chaos introduced into property rights by crusade and civil war.

Henry's true measure of cleverness, though, is on display in his innovations in criminal justice. Henry appointed "justices in eyre", the counterpart of circuit judges, to travel from town to town. When they arrived, they too called upon the sheriff to summon twelve free men from the surrounding areas. These twelve free men were a prototype of a grand jury. They were called to report under oath any accusations of crime they were aware of in the community. In theory, then as (in the United States and Liberia) now, the grand jury only brought accusations; it did not find guilt or innocence. The crimes to be investigated were specified in the Assize of Clarendon to be robbery, murder, or theft or anyone who had harboured a robber, murderer, or thief. To these the Assize of Northampton (1176) added counterfeiting, forgery, and arson. Minor crimes were specifically excepted so the new assizes concerned themselves with what would later be labeled "felonies".

This new assize did away with the old form of trial known as "compurgation" in accusations brought by the grand jury. Under compurgation, an accused person who swore he did not commit the crime, and who found a sufficient number of his neighbours to swear that they believed him, was acquitted. Compurgation was no longer available in charges brought by the grand jury.

The only trial available to the defendant remained the traditional trial by ordeal, specifically in the Assize of Clarendon, "the ordeal of water". Nevertheless, Henry did not put much faith in the results of the ordeal. The unfortunate felon who was convicted through the ordeal was typically executed. However, the Assize of Northampton (1176) provided that the loss of the right hand shall be added to a previous punishment of the loss of one foot for those who failed the ordeal. This implies that execution was not the inevitable result of a conviction. But even if the indicted culprit was acquitted in the ordeal, he was banished from the kingdom. In other words, the proceedings by the grand jury were the actual trial; everyone it accused was punished in some way, and the community was rid of the malefactor, one way or another, as adjudicated "by the oath of twelve knights of the hundred—or, should knights not be present, by the oath of twelve lawful freemen".

== Effects of the assize ==
These proceedings did much to transfer power out of the hands of local barons and into the hands of the royal court and its judges. In 1215, moreover, the Fourth Lateran Council forbade clergymen from participating in a trial by ordeal. After this date, trials after an indictment by the grand jury were conducted by juries as well.

The large changes wrought in the English system of justice did not go unchallenged. The dispute of jurisdiction over the one-sixth of the population of England who were clergy was the chief grievance between the king and Becket. Disgruntled peers attempted to undo Henry's reforms by the Magna Carta forced on King John, but by that time the reforms had progressed too far—and their superiority over the system they had replaced was too obvious—for the forces of reaction to gain much ground. Henry II's reforms laid the groundwork for the system of trials in common law.

== Bibliography ==
- Douglas, David C.; Greenaway, George W., eds. (1981), English Historical Documents. [Vol.2], c.1042–1189 (2nd ed.), London: Eyre Methuen, pp. 440–443, ISBN 0-413-32500-8
- Roger of Hoveden [Howden], Chronics Maiora
- W. R. Stubbs (ed.), Select Charters and Illustrations of English Constitutional History from the earliest times to the reign of Edward I, Clarendon Press (1870), pp. 143, 150.
