= Assize of novel disseisin =

Action to recover lands of which the plaintiff had been dispossed (obsolete)

In English law, the assize of novel disseisin ("recent dispossession"; /dɪsˈsiːzɪn/) was an action to recover lands of which the plaintiff had been disseised, or dispossessed. It was one of the so-called "petty (possessory) assizes" established by Henry II in the wake of the Assize of Clarendon of 1166; and like the other two was only abolished in 1833.

== Origin ==
Facing the disorder of self-help over the possession of land in the wake of the reign of King Stephen, Henry II in his nationwide assizes of Clarendon and Northampton had his justices "cause an inquisition to be made concerning dispossessions carried out contrary to the assize". Drawing on the sophisticated models offered by canon law, the king subsequently created the private (and purchasable) writ of novel disseisin, which enabled individuals to take disputed possession cases to the royal courts.

The action became extremely popular due to its speed (avoiding the delays or essoins of feudal justice), accessibility, and expediency. Rather than dealing with the issue of lawful possession, it simply asked whether dispossession had taken place, in which case the property was restored to the plaintiff, and the question of true ownership was dealt with later.

== Development ==
Although Henry had intended his newly created Grand Assize to determine issues of right, not possession, in land, in practice quite quickly novel disseisin superseded the Grand Assize and became itself the primary determinant of right in land—partly because, from dealing only with 'recent' disseisin, its remit was gradually extended further and further back in time. A further significant extension involved the application of the writ to profits and rights emanating from land, including rents. Thus, for example, the date of disseisin allowed at the Common Bench by 1321 went back as far as 1242; while in the 1321 London eyre, of eighty-one cases of novel disseisin, only half concerned property (houses or shops), the other half dealt with rents.

== Format ==
Ranulf de Glanvill's Treatise on the Laws and Customs of the Kingdom of England gives examples of novel disseisin writs, which were issued to a sheriff as a command from the king. The general structure was:

- The king acknowledges, with particular facts, the plaintiff's claim that the defendant disseised him of his land "unjustly and without a judgment" since the king's last voyage to Normandy.
- The sheriff, upon receiving security from the plaintiff, shall have twelve local men view the condition of the land and sign their names on the writ.
- These men shall be summoned later to the king's court, along with the defendant or his representative, to testify.

The date for the defendant to appear in court was rigorously enforced, in contrast to other processes that allowed excused absences (essoins).

== Abuses ==
Despite its advantages, novel disseisin was also open to abuse – as when a dispossessor pre-empted its use against the rightful seisin. With the passage of time, legalistic means of obstructing its working were devised, and, under bastard feudalism, the suborning of the juries that were the new assize's great strength also multiplied.

== Notable examples ==
- In 1422, Sir Thomas Malory was involved in pursuing a case of novel disseisin against Richard Clodeshall in the Midlands.

== See also ==
- Assize of mort d'ancestor
- Assize of darrein presentment
- Feet of fines
