= Assize of darrein presentment =

English clergy appointment legal action

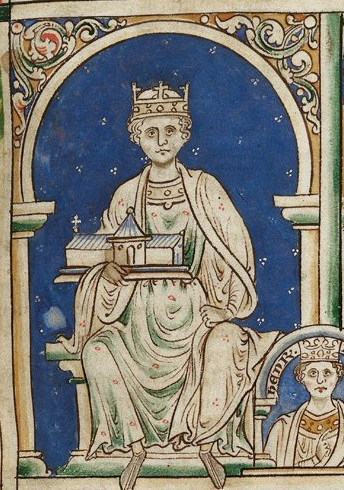
An illustration of Henry II of England and his eldest son Henry the Young King (inset, bottom right), from a 13th-century manuscript of Matthew Paris's Historia Anglorum. The assize of darrein presentment was one of the three "petty assizes" introduced by Henry II after 1166.

In English law, the assize of darrein presentment ("last presentation") was an action brought to determine who was the last patron to appoint to a vacant church benefice – and thus who could next appoint – when the plaintiff complained that he was deforced or unlawfully deprived of the right to appoint by the defendant.

== Origins ==
In the Constitutions of Clarendon of 1164, Henry II of England laid down the principle that "If a dispute shall arise ... concerning advowson and presentation to churches, let it be treated and concluded in the court of the king". While a controversial element in his (generally controversial) demarcation of church and state, in practice advowsons remained lay property in England; and some time after the 1166 Assize of Clarendon – probably around 1179 – Henry introduced the writ of darrein presentment, to provide a speedy judgement in cases of advowson dispute.

The Third Lateran Council of 1179 required that the local bishop appoint to church vacancies that had lasted longer than three months, thus injecting a new urgency into disputes over the right of presentation. By having a jury decide who had last presented to the church in question (in peacetime), and giving them (or their heirs) the current right of presentation, the new writ offered a swift and popular solution to a much litigated area.

== Development ==
So popular indeed was the new assize that Magna Carta would provide for easier access in section 18, which stated that "Inquests of ... darrein presentment shall not be held elsewhere than in the county in which they arise, and ... four times a year".

Legal complications arising from changes in church tenure during the last holder's lifetime meant that darrein presentment would eventually be supplemented by the action quare impedit.

Like the other two petty assizes, darrein presentment was finally abolished in 1833.

== See also ==
- Assize of mort d'ancestor
- Assize of novel disseisin
- Assize of Utrum
- Mortmain
