= Absentee voting in the United Kingdom =

Absentee voting in the United Kingdom is allowed by proxy or post (known as postal voting on demand) for any elector.

Proxy voting is allowed for people who will be away, working, or medically disabled. Anyone eligible to vote in the election may be a proxy for close relatives and two unrelated people.

Postal voting does not require a reason, apart from in Northern Ireland, where postal voting is available only if it would be unreasonable to expect a voter to go to a polling station on polling day as a result of employment, disability or education restrictions. Pilots in 2003 and 2004 showed a significant increase in turnout where postal voting was trialled and no evidence of an increase in electoral fraud. However, a 2016 government report found postal voting to be vulnerable to "fraud, undue influence, theft and tampering."

== History ==
Voting at elections originally took place by way of a public show of hands or by a public ballot. The right to vote by secret ballot was introduced by the Parliamentary and Municipal Elections Act 1872 (the Ballot Act 1872). After this voting took place at polling stations where voters marked their votes in secret and placed their ballot papers in a closed box.

Absent voting was first introduced for the immediate post-war period in 1918 for servicemen and others prevented by reason of the nature of their occupation…from voting at a poll by the Representation of the People Act 1918. Armed forces still serving overseas at the end of World War I were allowed to vote by post, and permanent arrangements were made for proxy voting by servicemen. The Representation of the People Act 1945 again made temporary provision for postal voting by service voters. Postal voting was not extended to civilians until 1948 when the Representation of the People Act 1948 granted postal voting facilities to both service personnel and to certain groups of civilians including those who were physically incapacitated, those unable to vote without making a journey by sea or air or because of the nature of their occupation, and those who were no longer residing at their qualifying address. All had to provide an address in the UK to which ballot papers could be sent. Service personnel could, alternatively, vote by proxy if they were likely to be at sea or abroad on polling day.

In 1983, in its review of electoral law, the Home Affairs Select Committee criticised the categories of absent voters who were allowed to vote by post. The Committee made clear that they would not wish absent voting facilities to be made available to everybody on demand but recommended that "the Home Office should review the existing criteria for eligibility for absent voting facilities, and in particular we suggest that it would be permissible to apply for a postal vote due to absence "by reason of employment", without the necessity to distinguish between one type of employment or another." The committee also called for voters absent on holiday to have the right to apply for a postal vote. The government responded to the committee's report in January 1984 and expressed some concern at the increased opportunities for electoral abuse offered by absent voting (especially postal voting) and in particular by the standing arrangements made for those allowed an absent vote for an indefinite period. However, the government's response was summed up as follows:

- First, apart from service voters and electors resident abroad, the right to apply for an absent vote for an indefinite period should, in general, be confined to those who are unable or likely to be unable to vote in person on polling day (or to vote unaided) through blindness or another physical incapacity. (The special arrangements for those unable to reach the polling station from their qualifying address without a sea or air journey would continue unchanged).
- Second, the right to apply for an absent vote at a particular parliamentary, European Parliament or local election in Great Britain should be extended to all those who for whatever reason are unable or likely to be unable to vote in person on polling day. This would benefit holidaymakers, people who are away in the course of employment and all other electors who although prevented from voting in person on polling day may not apply under existing provision.

The Representation of the People Act 1985 subsequently made provision for these extensions to the right to apply for an absent vote. The proposals did not apply to Northern Ireland where there was already widespread concern, shared by the government, at the extent and nature of electoral abuse, including the abuse of postal voting. Further amendments were made to the rules governing absent voting in the Representation of the People Act 1989.

By 1999 the system of postal and proxy voting for those unable to vote at polling stations was seen as cumbersome and complex. A Working Party on Electoral Procedures chaired by George Howarth, Parliamentary Under Secretary of State at the Home Office, published its report in October 1999. The working party recommended that

- Absent voting should be allowed on demand
- The application and voting procedures for absent voting should be simplified

The Representation of the People Act 2000 implemented the Howarth report's recommendations. The Representation of the People (England & Wales) Regulations 2001 introduced the changes to the absent voting arrangements from 16 February 2001. The main change was to allow postal voting on demand.

Since 2001, any elector has been entitled to request a postal vote (known as postal voting on demand) without giving a reason, apart from in Northern Ireland, where postal voting is available only if it would be unreasonable to expect a voter to go to a polling station on polling day as a result of employment, disability or education restrictions. Prior to 2001, postal votes had been available since 1948 only to those unable to attend a polling station for reasons of ill health, employment or planned holiday away from home and to some electors living on small islands where they would need to cross water to reach their polling station. Before 1985, holidays were not a sufficient reason, and the employment criterion allowed only some professions. After the introduction of on-demand postal voting in the UK, there has been a massive uptake in postal voting. Whilst in 2001 1.8 million postal ballots were distributed to voters, this had increased to more than 8 million postal ballots by the UK 2017 general election and represented one in every five ballots cast by the 2019 United Kingdom general election. Of those who opt for postal voting, the majority appear to do so out of the convenience the process provides. Individuals who are older or suffer from limitations on their physical mobility are significantly more inclined to opt for the convenience of mail-in ballots than their younger and more physically mobile peers.

Government requirements imposed in advance of the 2026 local government elections required all postal voters to renew their application by the end of January that year if they intended to continue to submit postal votes.

== Procedure ==
Registered voters who wish to vote by post must submit an additional application form to the electoral registration officer at their local authority (or to the Electoral Office for Northern Ireland if in Northern Ireland) stating whether they want their ballot paper to be sent for one single election, all elections until a specified date or indefinitely. They must also submit their date of birth, and signature specimen on the form (or apply for a grant of a signature waiver due to a disability or inability to read or write). In addition, if a person eligible to vote in the United Kingdom is chosen by another voter to be his/her proxy, the proxy can apply to vote by post. To receive a postal vote for an election, the postal vote application must have been received by the electoral registration officer by 5 p.m. eleven working days before polling day.

Returning officers issue and despatch postal ballot packs at 5 p.m. on the eleventh working day before polling day at the earliest. The issuing of postal ballots is not open to the scrutiny of candidates and their agents; by law, only the returning officers, their staff, representatives of the Electoral Commission and accredited observers are permitted to attend. Some returning officers produce postal ballot packs in house, whilst others outsource the process to an external company.

Each postal ballot pack contains inside the cover envelope a ballot paper, two envelopes ("A" and "B") and a postal voting statement. Postal ballot papers contain the following design, security and identification features on the reverse:

- an official mark (e.g. a watermark or an official stamp)
- a unique identifying mark (e.g. a barcode which is different for each individual ballot paper)
- a unique identification number

When issuing each postal ballot paper, the officer marks on a list (called the corresponding number list) next to the postal ballot's unique identification number the elector number of the voter to whom the postal ballot is sent, and then makes a mark next to the voter's name in a separate list of postal voters. The unique identification number of the postal ballot paper is also marked on the postal voting statement sent within the postal ballot pack. The local authority name and address and the name of the constituency/ward are printed on both envelopes "A" and "B". Once all ballot papers for an election have been issued by the returning officer, the corresponding number list is sealed in a packet which can only be opened upon the order of a court when an election result is challenged.

Upon receipt of the postal ballot pack, the voter completes the ballot paper according to the instructions and seals it inside the envelope marked "A". A separate postal voting statement must be filled in by the voter with his/her date of birth and signature (unless a signature waiver has been granted or if the voter is an anonymous elector). It is strongly recommended that postal voting statement and envelope "A" (containing the ballot paper) be placed and sealed inside the larger envelope "B" when returned, although this is not a requirement. The vote can be posted back to the returning officer at the local authority address (postage is prepaid when returned from within the United Kingdom), or returned in person to the returning officer at the local authority office, or directly handed in to a polling station on polling day (but only one which is situated within the constituency/ward marked on envelopes "A"/"B"). For the vote to be counted, it must reach the returning officer/polling station by the close of poll (usually 10 p.m. on polling day).

Upon receipt of a postal ballot pack in the post (or of the postal ballot paper and postal voting statement if sent separately), the returning officer places it inside the postal voters' ballot box allocated to the particular constituency/ward. If a presiding officer receives a postal ballot pack in a polling station, it is sealed inside a packet which is later delivered to the returning officer at the close of poll together with a form recording the number of postal ballot packs received by the presiding officer.

Candidates and their agents, representatives of the Electoral Commission and accredited observers are entitled to observe the opening of postal ballot packs – the returning officer must give candidates and their agents at least 48 hours' written notice of the time and location of every opening session of postal ballot packs. After emptying the postal voters' ballot box, the postal voting statements and envelopes marked "A"/loose postal ballot papers are separated into two different groups. The returning officer is required to verify the date of birth and signature filled in on at least 20% of the postal voting statements from each postal voters ballot box with the details provided on the original postal vote application forms. If the details do not match, then the postal voting statement is rejected. The returning officer makes a mark next to the name of the voter on the postal voters list for each postal voting statement received, even if it is selected for verification and rejected. On a separate list, the returning officer must write down the unique identification numbers of postal voting statements which were chosen for verification and subsequently rejected.

The returning officer then compiles all loose postal ballot papers together with postal ballot papers having been removed from envelopes marked "A". The unique identification numbers of all rejected postal ballot papers are noted on a list.

The postal ballot papers are counted and finally placed in the postal ballot boxes), except for rejected postal ballot papers and postal ballot papers which have the same unique identification number as rejected postal voting statements. The postal ballot boxes are securely sealed by the returning officer (candidates and agents can also apply their own seals).

At the count, the postal ballot boxes have their seals broken, are opened and then the postal ballot papers are counted.

Voters can contact the returning officer to check that their postal voting packs (or their postal voting statements and their postal ballot papers) have been received – however a response can only be given after an opening session since the returning officer will have to refer to the postal voters list. At the end of an election, the marked postal voter lists are open for public inspection and also can be purchased by the Electoral Commission, candidates, elected representatives, government departments, police forces, registered political parties and local constituency parties.

== Controversy ==
In the United Kingdom a 2016 government inquiry found that postal voting "was considered by some to be the UK's main electoral vulnerability and to provide the 'best' opportunity for electoral fraud... Evidence was presented of pressure being put on vulnerable members of some ethnic minority communities, particularly women and young people, to vote according to the will of the elders... the possibilities of undue influence, theft of postal votes and tampering with them after completion were all still risks." The government responded by saying it would consider the recommendations on postal voting.

The report recommended that voters update their signatures and other identifying information every three years, rather than every five years as now, to reduce the chance of rejecting valid ballots based on signature mis-matches.

The same 2016 report identified 330 allegations of voting offences from 2012 to 2015, of which at least 97 involved postal ballots. It also lists four "significant election court cases since 2004", of which three involved postal votes. The postal vote fraud at the 2004 European and local government elections in Birmingham received wide press attention.

== All-postal voting pilots ==
In 2000, the UK government passed legislation to permit local authorities to apply to pilot innovations in the method of voting at local elections (including all-postal voting, electronic voting, and voting at weekends), with the first pilot elections being held in May that year. In May 2000, 2002 and 2003, many local authorities piloted all-postal voting at their local elections. In May 2003, 35 local authorities did so. The outcome of those pilots was a recommendation from the Electoral Commission that all-postal voting should be adopted as the normal method of voting at local elections in the UK. This reflected the positive impact on voter turnout at these elections (in some places, turnout doubled) and the fact that there was no evidence of an increase in electoral fraud.

The local elections scheduled for May 2004 were postponed to June and combined with the European Parliament elections. The UK government used this opportunity to hold trials of all-postal voting in these elections in four regions, North East, North West, East Midlands and Yorkshire and the Humber. The pilots did show a significant increase in turnout where postal voting was tested.

== See also ==
- Absentee voting
- Electoral registration in the United Kingdom
- Representation of the People Act § United Kingdom
- Voter registration
