= Electoral history of the Labour Party (UK) =

Elections featuring UK political party

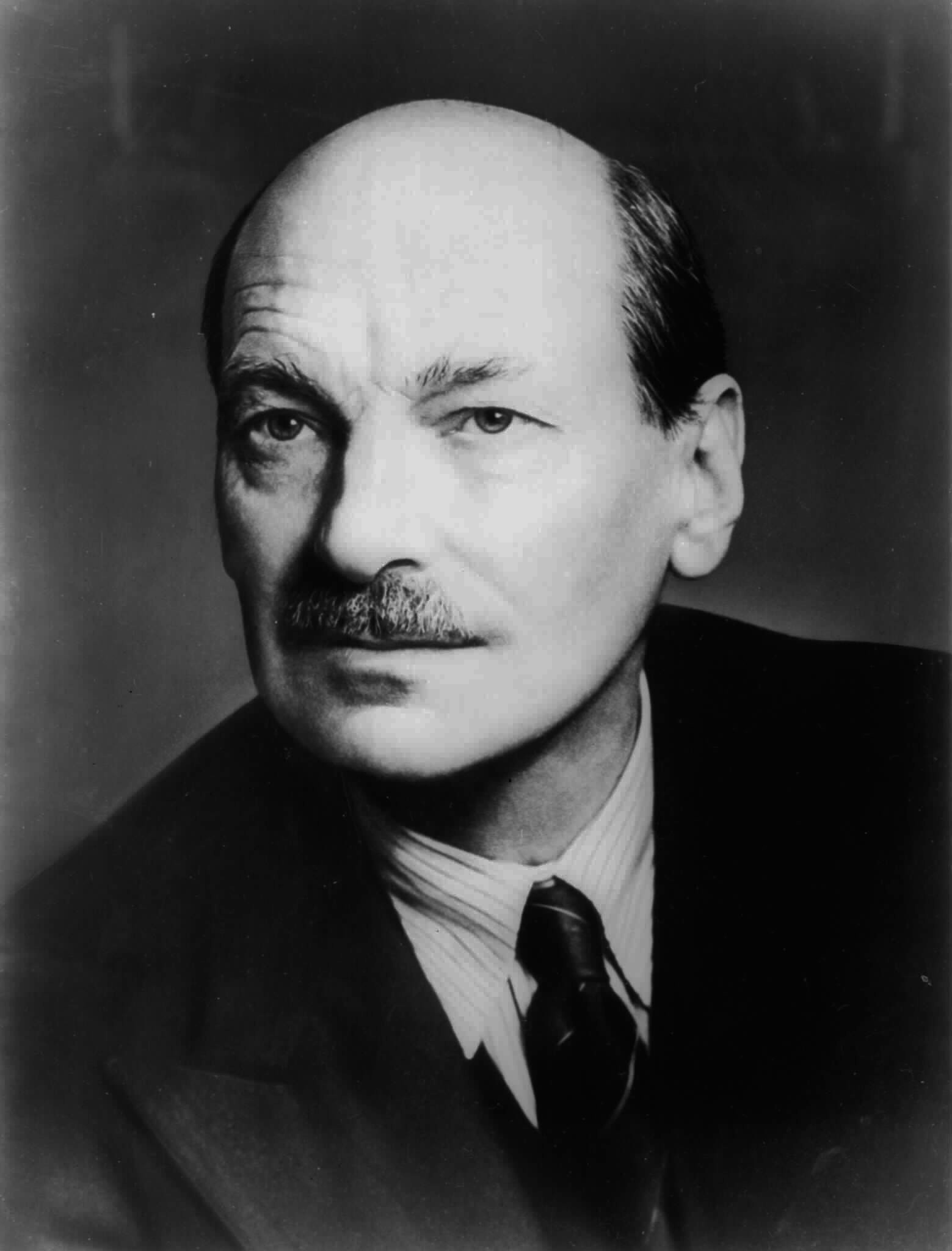
Clement Attlee, who led the Labour Party's first majority government

The Labour Party is a centre-left political party in the United Kingdom. Formed in 1900, it is one of the two main political parties along with the Conservative Party. In all general elections since 1918, Labour has been either the governing party or the Official Opposition. Since the 2010 general election, Labour was the second largest party in the UK for 14 years until the 2024 United Kingdom General election. Since 1918, Labour have formed 13 governments.

This article encompasses detailed results of previous UK general elections, devolved national elections in Scotland and Wales, devolved London elections and European Parliament elections which the Labour Party have participated in.

== Background ==
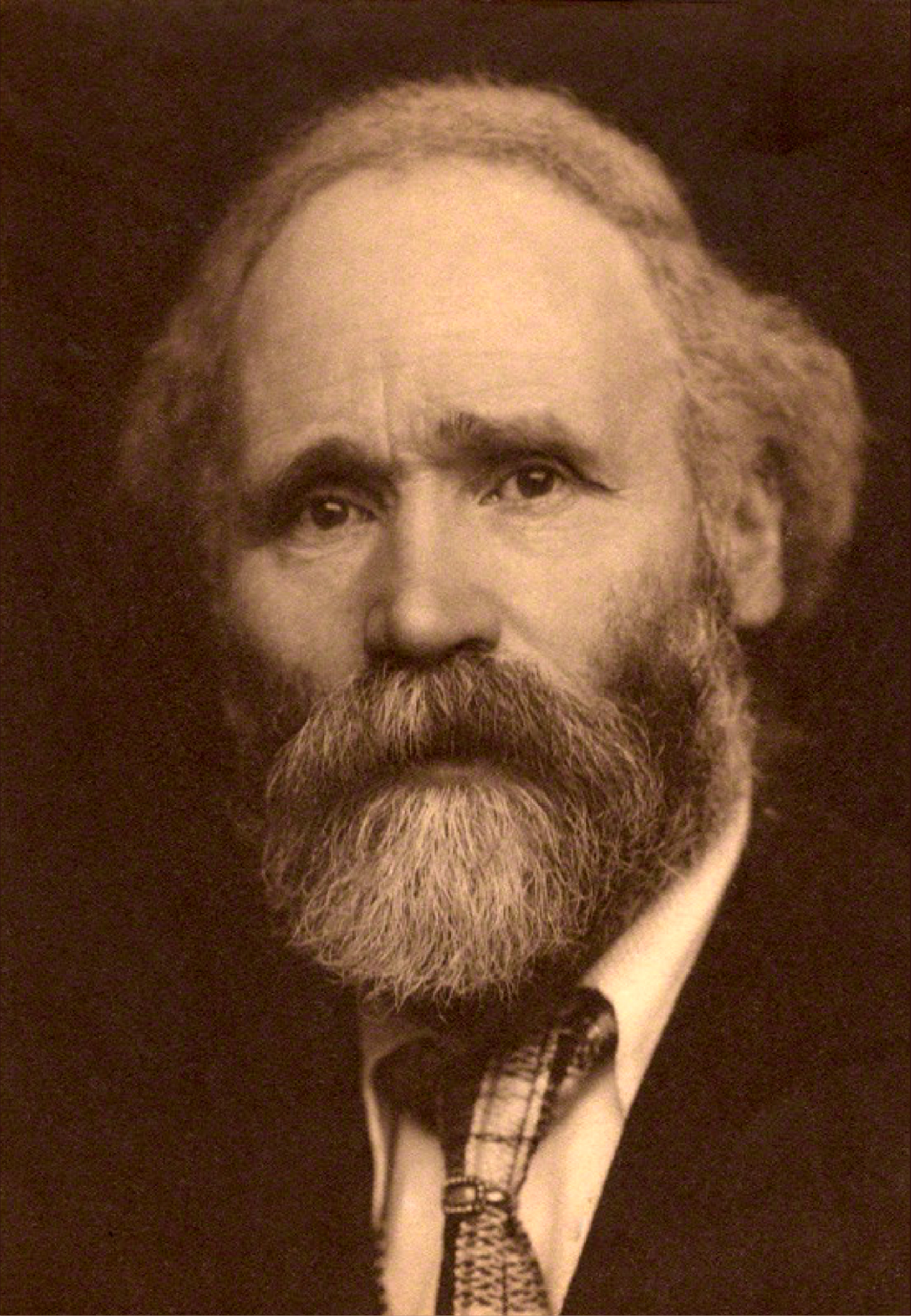
Keir Hardie, a founder of the Labour Party and its first parliamentary leader

The Labour Party was founded at a conference in February 1900 in London as the Labour Representation Committee (LRC). The party was formed as an alliance between trade unions, ethical socialists and state socialists. Following the 1906 general election, the LRC became the current Labour Party.

Labour are one of the two main political parties in the United Kingdom, along with the Conservative Party. The Labour Party sits on the centre-left of the political spectrum. In all general elections since 1918, Labour has been either the governing party or the Official Opposition. There have been eight Labour prime ministers. Since 1918, Labour have formed 12 governments, compared to 13 for the Conservatives within this period.

== National results ==
=== UK general elections ===
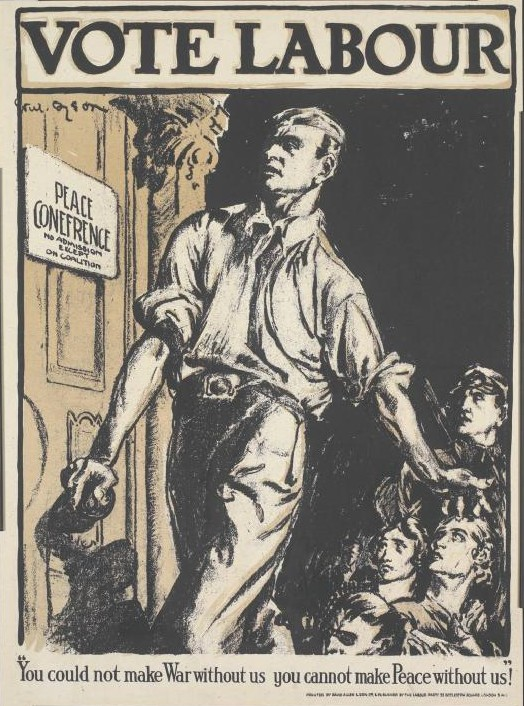
1918 Labour Party election poster

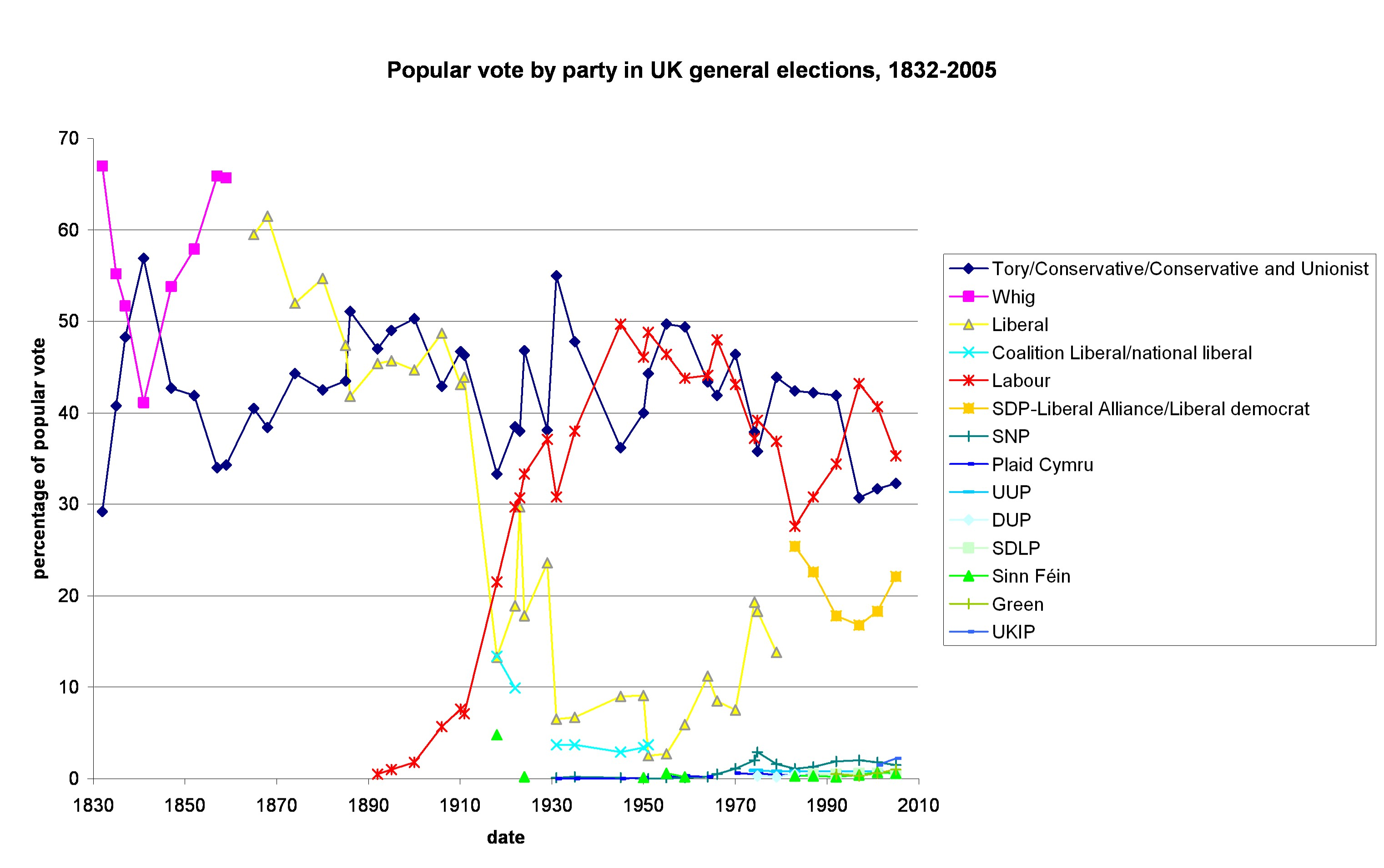
A graph showing the percentage of the popular vote received by major parties in general elections (1832–2005)

The voting system for general elections in the UK is the first past the post system. The first general election the party faced, then the Labour Representation Committee, was only six months after the inauguration of the party. Fifteen LRC candidates were put forward for the election, two of which were elected in 1900. In 1903, the Secretary of the LRC Ramsay MacDonald and the Liberal Party's Chief Whip Herbert Gladstone formed a secret electoral pact between the two parties. The party continued to grow over the following decade and by the December 1910 general election, Labour had 42 MPs.

Following the 1918 general election, Labour became the Official Opposition after the Conservatives went into coalition with the Liberal Party. Labour's first minority governments came following the 1923 and 1929 general elections, the latter being the first time Labour were the largest party in parliament by seats won. They formed their first majority government following the 1945 general election. However, after winning the 1950 general election, Labour would lose the following election in 1951 to the Conservatives despite gaining their highest share of votes to date at 48.8%. During the 1983 election, Labour posted their worst vote share in the post-war period at 27.6%. In 1997, a party record of 418 Labour MPs were elected.Labour also won an majority in 2001 and 2005. After losing power in the 2010 general election, Labour lost four consecutive general elections. At the 2019 general election, 202 Labour MPs were elected, the lowest for the party since 1935. At the 2024 general election, Labour returned to power after winning the election with a 174 seat majority.

Parliament of the United Kingdom
Election	Leader	Votes		Seats			Position	Result	Ref
Election	Leader	No.	Share	No.	±	Share	Position	Result	Ref
1900	Keir Hardie	62,698	1.8	2 / 670	▲2	0.3	4th	Conservative–Liberal Unionist	
1906	Keir Hardie	321,663	5.7	29 / 670	▲27	4.3	4th	Liberal	
January 1910	Arthur Henderson	505,657	7.6	40 / 670	▲11	6.0	4th	Liberal minority	
December 1910	George Nicoll Barnes	371,802	7.1	42 / 670	▲2	6.3	4th	Liberal minority	
1918 (Note: The first election held under the Representation of the People Act 1918 in which all men over 21, and most women over the age of 30 could vote, and therefore a much larger electorate.)	William Adamson	2,245,777	20.8	57 / 707	▲15	8.1	4th	Coalition Liberal–Conservative	
1922	J. R. Clynes	4,237,349	29.7	142 / 615	▲85	23.1	▲2nd	Conservative	
1923	Ramsay MacDonald	4,439,780	30.7	191 / 615	▲49	31.1	2nd	Labour minority	
1924	Ramsay MacDonald	5,489,087	33.3	151 / 615	▼40	24.6	2nd	Conservative	
1929 (Note: First election held under the Representation of the People (Equal Franchise) Act 1928 which gave all women aged over 21 the vote.)	Ramsay MacDonald	8,048,968	37.1	287 / 615	▲136	46.7	▲1st	Labour minority	
1931	Arthur Henderson	6,339,306	30.6	52 / 615	▼235	8.5	▼2nd	Conservative–Liberal–National Labour	
1935	Clement Attlee	8,325,491	38.0	154 / 615	▲102	25.0	2nd	Conservative–Liberal National–National Labour	
1945	Clement Attlee	11,967,746	49.7	393 / 640	▲239	61.4	▲1st	Labour	
1950	Clement Attlee	13,266,176	46.1	315 / 625	▼78	50.4	1st	Labour	
1951	Clement Attlee	13,948,385	48.8	295 / 625	▼20	47.2	▼2nd	Conservative	
1955	Clement Attlee	12,405,254	46.4	277 / 630	▼18	44.0	2nd	Conservative	
1959	Hugh Gaitskell	12,216,172	43.8	258 / 630	▼19	41.0	2nd	Conservative	
1964	Harold Wilson	12,205,808	44.1	317 / 630	▲59	50.3	▲1st	Labour	
1966	Harold Wilson	13,096,629	48.0	364 / 630	▲47	57.8	1st	Labour	
1970 (Note: Franchise extended to all 18- to 20-year-olds under the Representation of the People Act 1969.)	Harold Wilson	12,208,758	43.1	288 / 630	▼76	45.7	▼2nd	Conservative	
February 1974	Harold Wilson	11,645,616	37.2	301 / 635	▲13	47.4	▲1st	Labour minority	
October 1974	Harold Wilson	11,457,079	39.2	319 / 635	▲18	50.2	1st	Labour	
1979	James Callaghan	11,532,218	36.9	269 / 635	▼50	42.4	▼2nd	Conservative	
1983	Michael Foot	8,456,934	27.6	209 / 650	▼60	32.2	2nd	Conservative	
1987	Neil Kinnock	10,029,807	30.8	229 / 650	▲20	35.2	2nd	Conservative	
1992	Neil Kinnock	11,560,484	34.4	271 / 651	▲42	41.6	2nd	Conservative	
1997	Tony Blair	13,518,167	43.2	418 / 659	▲145	63.4	▲1st	Labour	
2001	Tony Blair	10,724,953	40.7	412 / 659	▼6	62.5	1st	Labour	
2005	Tony Blair	9,552,436	35.2	355 / 646	▼47	55.0	1st	Labour	
2010	Gordon Brown	8,606,517	29.0	258 / 650	▼90	39.7	▼2nd	Conservative–Liberal Democrats	
2015	Ed Miliband	9,347,324	30.4	232 / 650	▼26	35.7	2nd	Conservative	
2017	Jeremy Corbyn	12,877,918	40.0	262 / 650	▲30	40.3	2nd	Conservative minority (with DUP confidence and supply)	
2019	Jeremy Corbyn	10,269,051	32.1	202 / 650	▼60	31.1	2nd	Conservative	
2024	Keir Starmer	9,704,655	33.7	411 / 650	▲209	63.2	▲1st	Labour	

== Devolved national elections ==
=== Scottish Parliament elections ===
Following a referendum on devolution in September 1997, the Scottish people voted 'Yes' leading to the Scotland Act 1998. This act led to the formation of the Scottish Parliament in 1999. After Scotland voted 'No' in the 2014 Scottish independence referendum, additional powers were devolved to the Scottish Parliament after the Scotland Act 2016 reached royal assent. Elections to determine the composition of the Parliament take place once every five years under the additional member system. Overall, there are 73 constituency members (MSPs) and 56 regional members elected. Before 2016, elections were held every four years.

In the inaugural two elections, Labour were the largest party and formed a coalition with the Scottish Liberal Democrats on both occasions. However, Labour narrowly lost the 2007 election to the Scottish National Party (SNP). By seats won, Labour have been the third largest party in the Scottish Parliament behind the SNP and Conservatives since 2016. In the most recent election in 2021, Labour suffered their worst defeat in Holyrood after returning 22 MSPs.

Year	Leader	Votes	% share of votes (constituency)	% share of votes (list)	Seats	Change	Position	Resulting government	Ref
1999	Donald Dewar	908,346	38.8	33.6	56 / 129	—	1st	Labour–Liberal Democrats	
2003	Jack McConnell	663,585	34.6	29.3	50 / 129	▼6	1st	Labour–Liberal Democrats	
2007	Jack McConnell	648,374	32.1	29.2	46 / 129	▼4	▼2nd	SNP minority	
2011	Iain Gray	630,461	31.7	26.3	37 / 129	▼9	2nd	SNP majority	
2016	Kezia Dugdale	514,261	22.6	19.1	24 / 129	▼13	▼3rd	SNP minority	
2021	Anas Sarwar	584,392	21.7	18.9	22 / 129	▼2	3rd	SNP minority (Note: From 2021 to 2024, there was a cooperation agreement between the incumbent SNP and the Scottish Greens.)	
2026	Anas Sarwar	440,708	19.2	16	17 / 129	▼5	▲2nd	SNP minority	

=== Senedd elections ===
As part of Labour's 1997 winning UK general election manifesto, Labour committed to devolving power to Wales and Scotland subject to public consent from referendums. In July 1997, Labour released its white paper for devolution in Wales. This devolution deal would include 60 elected members who would take responsibility for £7 billion of funding. Furthermore, this new Assembly would have the right to pass secondary legislation in order to modify already existing laws. The devolution plans were endorsed by the public in the 1997 Welsh devolution referendum by 50.3% of the vote. The Government of Wales Act 1998 would receive royal assent with the Assembly to be formed following the first election in May 1999.

In 1999, the Welsh Assembly or Senedd Cymru was founded. From 1999 until 2011, Welsh Assembly elections were held once every four years, they are now held every five years. 40 Constituency Assembly Members (AMs) and 20 regional Assembly Members are elected at each election. The current voting system is the additional member system.

At every Senedd election, Labour has received the most votes and seats at each election, but has never formed a clear majority of seats. Labour formed a coalition with the Welsh Liberal Democrats from 2000 to 2003. From 2003 to 2007, Labour governed alone as a minority administration before serving in coalition with Plaid Cymru from 2007 to 2011. Labour have governed alone as a minority administration since 2011. Since 2021, Labour have had a formal cooperation agreement with Plaid Cymru to help pass budgets and to work together on several policy areas.

Year	Leader	% share of votes (constituency)	% share of votes (list)	Seats won	Change	Position	Resulting government	Ref
1999	Alun Michael	37.6	35.4	28 / 60	—	1st	Labour–Liberal Democrats (Note: Following the 1999 election, Labour initially formed a minority administration, however, by 2000 Labour had formed a coalition with the Liberal Democrats.)	
2003	Rhodri Morgan	40.0	36.6	30 / 60	▲2	1st	Labour minority	
2007	Rhodri Morgan	32.2	29.6	26 / 60	▼4	1st	Labour–Plaid Cymru	
2011	Carwyn Jones	42.3	36.9	30 / 60	▲4	1st	Labour minority	
2016	Carwyn Jones	34.7	31.5	29 / 60	▼1	1st	Labour minority	
2021	Mark Drakeford	39.9	36.2	30 / 60	▲1	1st	Labour minority	
2026	Eluned Morgan	N/A (Note: Election carried out under a new electoral system, the D'Hondt method instead of the mixed system used previously)	11.1	9 / 96	▼21	▼3rd	Plaid Cymru minority	

== Devolved regional elections ==
=== London Assembly elections ===
London Assembly elections are held every four years. Overall, there are 14 constituency members and 11 London-wide members who are elected by a party-list system. The voting system is the Additional-member system. The assembly holds the mayor of London to account through London Assembly committees and also votes on the mayor's budget. The first London Assembly election was held in 2000. Labour gained the most seats out of all of the parties in 2012 (12), 2016 (12), 2021 (11) and 2024 (11).

Year	Assembly leader	% share of votes (constituency)	% share of votes (list)	Seats	Change	Position	Ref
2000	Toby Harris	31.6	30.3	9 / 25	—	1st	
2004	Toby Harris	24.7	25.0	7 / 25	▼2	▼2nd	
2008	Len Duvall	28.0	27.6	8 / 25	▲1	2nd	
2012	Len Duvall	42.3	41.1	12 / 25	▲4	▲1st	
2016	Len Duvall	42.3	41.1	12 / 25	Steady	1st	
2021 (Note: This election was originally due to be held in 2020 but was postponed due to the COVID-19 pandemic.)	Len Duvall	41.7	38.1	11 / 25	▼1	1st	
2024	Len Duvall	39.8	38.4	11 / 25	Steady	1st	

=== London mayoral elections ===
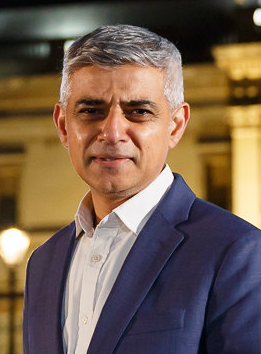
Sadiq Khan, Mayor of London since 2016

Elections to decide the Mayor of London have taken place since 2000. Ken Livingstone won the inaugural mayoral election as an independent candidate, ahead of the Conservative Party in second place and the Labour Party in third. He would later become the candidate for Labour in 2004, 2008 and 2012. Livingstone won for Labour in 2004 before losing to the Conservative candidate, Boris Johnson in both 2008 and 2012. These elections take place every four years with the incumbent mayor being Sadiq Khan of the Labour Party since 2016. The voting system for the mayoral elections from 2000 until 2021 was the supplementary vote system. However, for the election in 2024, the first past the post system was used instead. In 2024, Khan won a third successive term.

Year	Mayoral candidate	Vote total	Vote share (%)	Mayoralty	Ref
2000	Frank Dobson	–	–	✗	
2004	Ken Livingstone	828,390	55.4	✓	
2008	Ken Livingstone	1,029,406	46.8	✗	
2012	Ken Livingstone	992,273	48.5	✗	
2016	Sadiq Khan	1,310,143	56.8	✓	
2021 (Note: This election was originally due to be held in 2020 but was postponed due to the COVID-19 pandemic.)	Sadiq Khan	1,206,034	55.2	✓	
2024	Sadiq Khan	1,088,225	43.8	✓	

=== Combined authority elections ===
The first 'combined authority elections' took place in 2017 to determine six elected mayors (Metro-mayors) of different combined authorities in England. These elections stemmed from the 'devolution deals' policy announced by George Osborne in 2014. Combined authorities are local government institutions formed by two or more local councils.

The system of voting for these elections was originally the supplementary vote system. Ahead of the 2023 local elections, the first past the post system replaced the supplementary vote system for future combined authority elections. As of August 2024, there are ten Labour Party Metro Mayors in: Cambridgeshire and Peterborough, Greater Manchester, East Midlands, Liverpool City region, North-East, Sheffield City region, West Midlands, West of England, West Yorkshire and York and North Yorkshire. Comparatively, there is one Conservative Party Metro Mayor which is in the Tees Valley region.

Year	Mayoralties won	Change	Ref
2017	2 / 6	▲2	
2018	1 / 1	▼1	
2019	1 / 1	1	
2021	5 / 7	▲2	
2022	1 / 1	▲1	
2024	8 / 9	▲1	

== European ==
=== European Parliament elections ===
During the UK's membership of the European Union (1973–2020), the UK participated in European Parliament elections, held every five years from 1979 until 2019. Elections to the European Parliament began in 1979, and were held under the first past the post system until the 1994 election. From 1999 onwards, a regional list system of proportional representation system was used.

Labour's best result was the 1994 election in terms of numbers of MEPs elected (62/87) and vote share (44%). The party earned more votes in 2004 than in 1999 but their vote share fell due to a higher turnout. In 2009, Labour finished behind the Conservatives and UKIP.

Year	Leader	Votes	% share of votes	Seats	Change	Position	Ref
1979	James Callaghan	4,253,207	33	17 / 81	—	2nd	
1984	Neil Kinnock	4,865,261	37	32 / 81	▲15	2nd	
1989	Neil Kinnock	6,153,661	40	45 / 81	▲13	▲1st	
1994	Margaret Beckett (Note: Margaret Beckett was leader ad interim.)	6,753,881	44	62 / 87	▲17	1st	
1999 (Note: Electoral system changed from first past the post to proportional representation.)	Tony Blair	2,803,820	28.0	29 / 87	▼33	▼2nd	
2004	Tony Blair	3,718,683	22.6	19 / 78	▼10	2nd	
2009	Gordon Brown	2,381,760	15.7	13 / 72	▼6	▼3rd	
2014	Ed Miliband	4,020,646	25.4	20 / 73	▲7	▲2nd	
2019	Jeremy Corbyn	2,347,255	14.1	10 / 73	▼10	▼3rd	

== See also ==
- Electoral history of the Conservative Party (UK)
- List of Labour Party (UK) MPs
- Opinion polling for the 2024 United Kingdom general election
- Politics of the United Kingdom
