= Voting age =

Minimum age of eligible voters

A legal voting age is the minimum age that a person is allowed to vote in a democratic process. Most nations use 18 years of age as their voting age, but for other countries their voting age ranges between 16 and 21 (with the sole exception of the United Arab Emirates, where the voting age is 25). A nation's voting age may therefore coincide with the country's age of majority, but in many cases the two are not tied.

== History ==
In 1891, the South African Republic, commonly known as the Transvaal Republic, set a voting age of 18 years. The effort was, like later legislation expanding voting rights for women and impoverished whites, in part an attempt to skew the electorate further in favor of Afrikaner interests against uitlanders.

Prior to the Second World War of 1939–1945, the voting age in almost all countries was 21 years or higher. The U.S. state of Georgia lowered its age to 18 by referendum in 1943, for all elections including Congress and President, on the basis that many under 21 were at war; Kentucky followed suit in 1955. In 1946, Czechoslovakia became the first state to reduce the voting age nationally to 18 years, and by 1968 a total of 17 countries had lowered their voting age.

Australia, Japan, Sweden and Switzerland had lowered their voting age to 20 by the end of the 1960s.

Many major democratic countries, beginning in Western Europe and North America, reduced their voting ages to 18 years during the 1970s, starting with the United Kingdom (Representation of the People Act 1969), Canada, West Germany (1970), the United States (26th Amendment, 1971), Australia (1974), France (1974), Sweden (1975) and others. It was argued that if young men could be drafted to go to war at 18, they should be able to vote at the age of 18.

In the late 20th and early 21st centuries voting ages were lowered to 18 in Japan, India, Switzerland, Austria, the Maldives, and Morocco. By the end of the 20th century, 18 had become by far the most common voting age. However, a few countries maintain a voting age of 20 years or higher, and a few countries have a lower voting age of 16 or 17.

=== 2020 to 2021 ===
The vast majority of countries and territories have a minimum voting age of 18-years-old as of October 2020. According to data from the ACE Electoral Knowledge Network, 205 countries and territories have a minimum voting age of 18 for national elections out of 237 countries and territories the organization has data on as of October 2020. As of the aforementioned date, 12 countries or territories have a minimum voting age of less than 18, with 3 countries or territories at 17-years-old, and 9 countries or territories at 16-years-old. 16-years-old is the lowest minimum age globally for national elections, while the highest is 25-years-old which is only the case in the United Arab Emirates (UAE). This age of 25 was also the case in Italy for Senate (upper house) elections until it was lowered to 18 in 2021. Italy's lower house of Parliament, the Chamber of Deputies, has had a minimum voting age of 18 since 1975, when it was lowered from 21.

== Debate on lowering the voting age ==
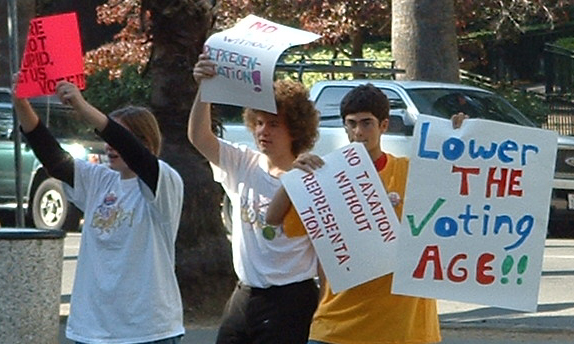
Demonstration in favor of lowering the voting age by members of NYRA Berkeley, California (2004)

Around 2000, a number of countries began to consider whether the voting age ought to be reduced further, with arguments most often being made in favor of a reduction to 16. In Brazil, the age was lowered to 16 in the 1988 Constitution, while the lower voting age took effect for the first time in the 1989 Presidential Election. The earliest moves in Europe came during the 1990s, when the voting age for municipal elections in some States of Germany was lowered to 16. Lower Saxony was the first state to make such a reduction, in 1995, and four other states did likewise.

In 2007, Austria became the first european country to allow 16- and 17-year-olds to vote in national elections, with the expanded franchise first being consummated in the 2009 European Parliament election. A study of young voters' behavior on that occasion showed them to be as capable as older voters to articulate their beliefs and to make voting decisions appropriate for their preferences. Their knowledge of the political process was only insignificantly lower than in older cohorts, while trust in democracy and willingness to participate in the process were markedly higher. Additionally, there was evidence found for the first time of a voting boost among young people age 16–25 in Austria.

During the 2000s several proposals for a reduced voting age were put forward in U.S. states, including California, Florida and Alaska, but none were successful. In Oregon, Senate Joint Resolution 22 has been introduced to reduce the voting age from 18 to 16. A national reduction was proposed in 2005 in Canada and in the Australian state of New South Wales, but these proposals were not adopted. In May 2009, Danish Member of Parliament Mogens Jensen presented an initiative to the Parliamentary Assembly of the Council of Europe in Strasbourg to lower the voting age in Europe to 16. In 2026 Hungary’s prime minister proposed lowering voting age to 16.

Demands to reduce the voting age to 16 years were again brought forward by activists of the school strike for climate movement in several countries (including Germany and the UK).

=== Australia ===
After Premier Don Dunstan introduced the Age of Majority (Reduction) Bill in October 1970, the voting age in South Australia was lowered from 21 to 18 in 1973.

On 21 October 2019, Greens MP Adam Bandt introduced a bill in the House of Representatives to lower the voting age to 16.

A report suggesting that consideration be given to reducing the voting age to 16 in the Australian Capital Territory in Canberra, Australia was tabled in the territorial legislature on 26 September 2007 and defeated.

In 2015, federal Opposition Leader Bill Shorten said that the voting age should be lowered to 16.

=== Austria ===
In 2007, Austria became the first member of the European Union to adopt a voting age of 16 for most purposes. The voting age had been reduced in Austria from 19 to 18 at all levels in 1992. At that time a voting age of 16 was proposed by the Green Party, but was not adopted.

The voting age for municipal elections in some states was lowered to 16 shortly after 2000. Three states had made the reduction by 2003 (Burgenland, Carinthia and Styria), and in May 2003 Vienna became the fourth. Salzburg followed suit, and so by the start of 2005 the total had reached at least five states out of nine. As a consequence of state law, reduction of the municipal voting age in the states of Burgenland, Salzburg and Vienna resulted in the reduction of the regional voting age in those states as well.

After the 2006 election, the winning SPÖ-ÖVP coalition announced on 12 January 2007 that one of its policies would be the reduction of the voting age to 16 for elections in all states and at all levels in Austria. The policy was set in motion by a Government announcement on 14 March, and a bill proposing an amendment to the Constitution was presented to the legislature on 2 May. On 5 June the National Council approved the proposal following a recommendation from its Constitution Committee. During the passage of the bill through the chamber relatively little opposition was raised to the reduction, with four out of five parties explicitly supporting it; indeed, there was some dispute over which party had been the first to suggest the idea. Greater controversy surrounded the other provisions of the bill concerning the Briefwahl, or postal vote, and the extension of the legislative period for the National Council from four to five years. A further uncontroversial inclusion was a reduction in the candidacy age from 19 to 18. The Federal Council approved the Bill on 21 June, with no party voting against it. The voting age was reduced when the Bill's provisions came into force on 1 July 2007. Austria thus became the first member of the European Union, and the first of the developed world democracies, to adopt a voting age of 16 for all purposes. Lowering the voting age encouraged political interest in young people in Austria. More sixteen- and seventeen-year-olds voted than eighteen-to-twenty-one-year-olds in Austria.

=== Brazil ===
Brazil lowered the voting age from 18 to 16 in the 1988 constitution. The presidential election of 1989 was the first with the lower voting age. People between the ages 18 and 70 are required to vote. The person must be 16 full years old on the eve of the election (In years without election, the person must be 16 full years old on or before 31 December). If they turn 18 years old after the election, the vote is not compulsory. When they turn 18 years old before the election, the vote is compulsory.

=== Canada ===
Canada lowered its federal voting age from 21 to 18 in 1970. Most Canadian provinces soon followed suit, though several initially lowered their voting age to 19. It wasn't until 1992 when the last province, British Columbia, lowered its voting age to 18. A further reduction to 16 years was proposed federally in 2005, but was not adopted. It was proposed again in 2011, but was not adopted.

In August 2018, in British Columbia, a group of 20 youth partnered with Dogwood BC to launch a Vote16 campaign. Currently, they have unanimous support from the Union of BC Municipalities, as well as endorsements from the province's Green Party of British Columbia and British Columbia New Democratic Party representatives. The campaign is now waiting for it to be brought up in the legislative assembly by the NDP and for it to pass there.

In 2020, Canadian Senator Marilou McPhedran introduced a bill to lower the federal voting age from 18 to 16. She reintroduced it again in November 2021, (bill S-201), but it died on the floor when Parliament was prorogued in January 2025. In December 2021, a group of young people filed a court challenge to lower the federal voting age from 18, arguing that the voting age is unconstitutional for violating multiple sections of the Canadian Charter of Rights and Freedoms. Several weeks later, Taylor Bachrach of the New Democratic Party (NDP) introduced a private member's bill to lower the voting age to 16. The bill (C-210) was debated in May 2022. The bill was defeated in its second reading with 245 members of parliament voting to oppose the bill and 77 voting to support it.

Internal elections run by Canadian political parties have a lower voting age than that of general elections set by the government, typically allowing party members 14 and up to vote.

=== Cuba ===
As stated in the Constitution of the Republic of Cuba, the voting age is 16 for men and women.

=== Germany ===
As part of their 2021 coalition deal, the SPD, Greens and FDP agreed to lower the voting age for European Elections to 16 within the course of the 20th Bundestag. They successfully did so in time for the 2024 European parliament elections. They also aimed to lower the voting age for elections to the German parliament. However, this would need a change of the constitution, which was blocked by the opposition CDU. Eight of the 16 states have also lowered their voting age for state elections and 11 of the 16 have lowered it for local elections.

=== Iceland ===
The first proposal to lower the voting age to 16 years was submitted in parliament in 2007. A bill to lower the voting age for municipal elections reached the final reading in 2018, but was filibustered by opponents until the close of the parliamentary session.

Since 2022, municipalities can lower the voting age to 16 for referendums. As of June 2026, Hornafjörður and Vesturbyggð have done so.

=== Iran ===
Iran had been unique in awarding suffrage at 15, but raised the age to 18 in January 2007 despite the opposition of the Government. In May 2007 the Iranian Cabinet proposed a bill to reverse the increase.

=== Ireland ===
In 2013, the Constitutional Convention was asked to consider reducing the voting age to 17 and recommended lowering it to 16. The then government agreed to hold a referendum, but in 2015 postponed it indefinitely to give priority to other referendums.

=== Luxembourg ===
Currently, Luxembourg has compulsory voting from the age of 18.

Discussion about lowering the voting age to 16 was first introduced as part of a wider June 2015 referendum. The broader principles of the referendum which concerned electoral reform were rejected by 81% of voters.

Discussion, specifically surrounding the lowering of the voting age to 16 received almost universal support in 2025. Politically, only the ADR and CSV oppose the idea.

=== Malta ===
On 20 November 2013, Malta lowered the voting age from 18 to 16 for local elections starting from 2015. The proposal had wide support from both the government and opposition, social scientists and youth organizations.

On Monday, 5 March 2018, the Maltese Parliament unanimously voted in favor of amending the constitution, lowering the official voting age from 18 to 16 for general elections, European Parliament Elections and referendums, making Malta the second state in the EU to lower its voting age to 16.

=== New Zealand ===
The New Zealand Green Party MP Sue Bradford announced on 21 June 2007 that she intended to introduce her Civics Education and Voting Age Bill on the next occasion upon which a place became available for the consideration of Members' Bills. When this happened on 25 July Bradford abandoned the idea, citing an adverse public reaction. The Bill would have sought to reduce the voting age to 16 in New Zealand and make civics education part of the compulsory curriculum in schools.

On 21 November 2022, the Supreme Court of New Zealand ruled in Make It 16 Incorporated v Attorney-General that the voting age of 18 was "inconsistent with the bill of rights to be free from discrimination on the basis of age". Prime Minister Jacinda Ardern subsequently announced that a bill to lower the voting age to 16 would be debated in parliament, requiring a supermajority to pass. This bill was subsequently withdrawn in January 2024, after the Sixth National Government of New Zealand was elected.

=== United Kingdom ===
The Representation of the People Act 1969 lowered the voting age from 21 to 18 for elections to the House of Commons of the Parliament of the United Kingdom, the first major democratic nation to do so. The 1970 United Kingdom general election is the first in which this Act had effect.

Men in military service who turned 19 during the First World War were entitled to vote in 1918 irrespective of their age as part of the Representation of the People Act 1918 which also allowed some women over the age of 30 to vote. The Representation of the People (Equal Franchise) Act 1928 brought the voting age for women down to 21.

The reduction of the voting age to 16 in the United Kingdom was first given serious consideration in 1999, when the House of Commons considered in Committee an amendment proposed by Simon Hughes to the Representation of the People Bill. This was the first time the reduction of a voting age below 18 had ever been put to a vote in the Commons. The Government opposed the amendment, and it was defeated by 434 votes to 36.

The Votes at 16 coalition, a group of political and charitable organizations supporting a reduction of the voting age to 16, was launched on in 2003. At that time a Private Member's Bill was also proposed in the House of Lords by Lord Lucas.

In 2004, the UK Electoral Commission conducted a major consultation on the subject of the voting age and age of candidacy, and received a significant response. In its conclusions, it recommended that the voting age remain at 18. In 2005, the House of Commons voted 136-128 (on a free vote) against a Private Member's Bill for a reduction in the voting age to 16 proposed by Liberal Democrat MP Stephen Williams. Parliament chose not to include a provision reducing the voting age in the Electoral Administration Act during its passage in 2006.

The report of the Power Inquiry in 2006 called for a reduction of the voting age, and of the candidacy age for the House of Commons, to 16. On the same day the Chancellor of the Exchequer, Gordon Brown, indicated in an article in The Guardian that he favored a reduction provided it was made concurrently with effective citizenship education.

The Ministry of Justice published in 2007 a Green Paper entitled The Governance of Britain, in which it proposed the establishment of a "Youth Citizenship Commission". The Commission would examine the case for lowering the voting age. On launching the paper in the House of Commons, Prime Minister Gordon Brown said: "Although the voting age has been 18 since 1969, it is right, as part of that debate, to examine, and hear from young people themselves, whether lowering that age would increase participation."

During the Youth Parliament debates of in 2009 in the House of Commons, Votes at 16 was debated and young people of that age group voted for it overwhelmingly as a campaign priority. In April 2015, Labour announced that it would support the policy if it won an overall majority in the 2015 general election, which it failed to do.

Surrounding Brexit, in June 2016, the government was criticised for not lowering the voting age to 16 for the referendum.

In July 2024 however, Keir Starmer the current leader of the UK Labour Party, became elected as Prime Minister of the United Kingdom. As part of the parties 2024 manifesto (in the run up to the general election) Labour maintained this previous position, Keir Starmer himself confirming that he would lower the voting age from 18 to 16 in all elections (if elected). Prior to the 2024 election, the voting age in both Scotland and Wales was and is already set at 16, by the relevant governments of both UK nations (see detail specifics below).

In July 2025, the government announced that the minimum voting age for all elections in the UK would be reduced to 16 by the 2029 general election, branding it a "seismic" change, in addition to adding bank cards as valid voter ID.

==== Northern Ireland ====
The voting age for elections to the Parliament of Northern Ireland and local elections was reduced from 21 to 18 by the Electoral Law Act (Northern Ireland) 1969.

Elections for the Northern Ireland Assembly and local elections are a reserved matter, and as such the voting age for the Northern Ireland Assembly is not within its legislative competences. The Representation of the People Bill would reduce the voting age for the Northern Ireland Assembly and local government from 18 to 16. This policy is opposed by the Democratic Unionst Party. It is supported by the Alliance Party, Sinn Féin, the Ulster Unionist Party, the Social Democratic and Labour Party, and People Before Profit.

==== Scotland ====
The Scottish National Party conference voted unanimously on 27 October 2007 for a policy of reducing the voting age to 16 (the age of majority in Scotland), as well as in favour of a campaign for the necessary power to be devolved to the Scottish Parliament.

In September 2011, it was announced that the voting age was likely to be reduced from 18 to 16 for the Scottish independence referendum. This was approved by the Scottish Parliament in June 2013.

In June 2015, the Scottish Parliament voted unanimously to reduce the voting age to 16 for elections for the Scottish Parliament and for Scottish local government elections. The voting age in Scotland remains 18 for UK general elections.

==== Wales ====
Major reforms were recommended in 2017 in the 'A Parliament That Works For Wales' report, by the expert panel on Assembly Electoral Reform led by Professor Laura McAllister. It included increasing the size of the Assembly, adapting or changing the electoral system and reducing the age of voting to 16.

The Welsh Assembly's Commission, the corporate body, introduced a bill in 2019 to reduce the voting age to 16 and change the Assembly's name to Senedd. The National Assembly for Wales passed the Senedd and Election (Wales) Act later that year. A vote to remove this enfranchisement was defeated by 41 votes to 11. The first election to include the biggest enfranchisement in Welsh politics since 1969 was the 2021 Senedd election.

The Welsh Government also legislated for the enfranchisement of 16- and 17-year-olds in the Local Government and Elections (Wales) Act, which received royal assent in 2021. The changes – which included lowering the voting age to 16 for local elections in Wales – were in place for local Welsh elections in 2022. The voting age in Wales remains at 18 for UK general elections.

==== British Overseas Territories ====
The British Overseas Territories are those parts of the British Realm that lie outside the archipelago of the British Isles. Before 1983, they were termed British colonies, and, from 1983 to 2002, British Dependent Territories).

The voting age in the British Overseas Territories for the United Kingdom Parliamentary elections would be the same as in that part of the realm that lies within the British Isles. However no electoral district has ever been created for any such territory, and British nationals from the territories must first establish residency in an existing electoral district in order to exercise their voting rights in national elections.

Local elected legislatures were established in Virginia in 1619 and Bermuda (originally settled as part of Virginia) in 1620. After the Act of Union 1707, sovereignty remained with the British parliament, which asserted its right to legislate for the colonies, though in practice certain competencies were delegated by the British government to the local governments (varying depending upon the degree of representation in the local government of each colony).

Since the 1960s, most of the remaining colonies have been given elected legislatures similar to Bermuda's (or the Councils that advise the appointed governors, originally made up only of appointees, now include elected members), with the enfranchisement for local elections determined by local legislation (subject, like all local legislation, to the approval of the national government). In Anguilla, Bermuda, the British Virgin Islands, the Cayman Islands, the Falkland Islands, Gibraltar, Montserrat, the Pitcairn Islands, Saint Helena (and presumably Ascension Island and Tristan da Cunha), and Turks and Caicos Islands the current voting ages for local elections are all 18. There are no permanent inhabitants, and no local legislatures, in British Antarctic Territory, British Indian Ocean Territory, and South Georgia and the South Sandwich Islands. Under the agreement with Cyprus by which Britain retained the Sovereign Base Areas of Akrotiri and Dhekelia, the British government agreed not to set up and administer "colonies" and not to allow new settlement of people in the Sovereign Base Areas other than for temporary purposes. There is no local legislature, and consequently there are no local elections.

==== Crown Dependencies ====
As of 2025, the voting age in all British Crown Dependencies is now set at 16.

Moves to lower the voting age to 16 were first successful in the three British Crown dependencies from 2006 to 2008. The Isle of Man was the first to amend previous legislation in 2006, when it reduced the voting age to 16 for its general elections, with the House of Keys approving the move by 19 votes to 4.

Jersey followed suit in 2007, when it approved a reduction of the voting age to 16. The States of Jersey voted narrowly in favour, by 25 votes to 21, and the legislative amendments were adopted. The law was sanctioned by Order in Council, and was brought into force in time for the general elections in late 2008.

In 2007, a proposal for a reduction (in voting age to 16) made by the House Committee of the States of Guernsey, and approved by the States' Policy Committee, was adopted by the assembly by 30 votes to 15. An Order in Council sanctioned the law, and it was registered at the Court of Guernsey. It came into force immediately, and the voting age was accordingly reduced in time for the 2008 Guernsey general election.

In 2022, both Alderney and Sark passed legislation which lowered the voting age to 16 for all elections going forward.

=== United States ===
Blue indicates a state that allows 17-year-olds who will turn 18 on or before election day to vote in caucuses or primaries. Pink indicates states that allow 17-year-olds to participate in presidential caucuses, but may not vote in primary elections for other offices.

In the United States, the debate about lowering the voting age from 21 to 18 began during World War II and intensified during the Vietnam War, when most of those subjected to the draft were too young to vote, and the image of young men being forced to risk their lives in the military without the privileges of voting successfully pressured legislators to lower the voting age nationally and in many states. By 1968, several states had lowered the voting age below 21 years. In 1959, Alaska entered the Union with a minimum age of 19 and Hawaii with a minimum age of 20; meanwhile, Georgia and Kentucky had already changed their minimum voting ages to 18 in the preceding two decades. In 1970, the Supreme Court ruled in Oregon v. Mitchell that Congress had the right to regulate the minimum voting age in federal elections; however, it decided that it could not regulate the voting age at the local and state levels.

The Twenty-sixth Amendment to the United States Constitution (passed and ratified in 1971) prevents states from setting a voting age higher than 18. Except for the express limitations provided for in Amendments XIV, XV, XIX and XXVI, voter qualifications for House and Senate elections are largely delegated to the States under Article I, Section 2 and Amendment XVII of the United States Constitution, which respectively state that "The House of Representatives shall be composed of Members chosen every second Year by the People of the several States, and the Electors in each State shall have the Qualifications requisite for Electors of the most numerous Branch of the State Legislature." and "The Senate of the United States shall be composed of two Senators from each State, elected by the people thereof, for six years; and each Senator shall have one vote. The electors in each State shall have the qualifications requisite for electors of the most numerous branch of the State legislatures."

Seventeen states permit 17-year-olds to vote in primary elections and caucuses if they will be 18 by election day: Colorado, Connecticut, Delaware, Illinois, Indiana, Kentucky, Maine, Maryland, Mississippi, Nebraska, New Mexico, North Carolina, Ohio, South Carolina, Virginia, Vermont, and West Virginia. Iowa, Minnesota, and Nevada allow 17-year-olds to participate in all presidential caucuses, but may not vote in primary elections for other offices. Alaska, Hawaii, Idaho, Kansas, Washington, and Wyoming allow 17-year-olds to participate in only Democratic caucuses, but not in the Republican caucus.

All states allow someone not yet 18 to preregister to vote. Fifteen states — California, Colorado, Delaware, District of Columbia, Florida, Hawaii, Louisiana, Maryland, Massachusetts, New York, North Carolina, Oregon, Rhode Island, Utah, Virginia, and Washington — and Washington, D.C., allow 16-year-olds to preregister. In Maine, Nevada, New Jersey, and West Virginia, 17-year-olds can preregister. Alaska allows a teen to preregister within 90 days of their 18th birthday. Georgia, Iowa, and Missouri allow 17.5-year-olds to preregister if they turn 18 before the next election. Texas allows someone 17 year and 10 months old to preregister. The remaining states, excepting North Dakota, do not specify an age for preregistration so long as the teen will be 18 by the next election (usually the next general election). North Dakota does not require voter registration.

On 3 April 2019, Andrew Yang became the first major presidential candidate to advocate for the United States to lower its voting age to 16. At 16, Americans do not have hourly limits imposed on their work, and they pay taxes. According to Yang, their livelihoods are directly impacted by legislation, and they should therefore be allowed to vote for their representatives.

In 2018, a bill in the Council of the District of Columbia was proposed to lower the voting age to 16, which would make the federal district the first jurisdiction to lower the voting age for federal level elections. In 2019, Washington D.C., Council Member Charles Allen sponsored a debate on whether or not the city should lower the voting age to 16 for all elections, including the presidential election in the city. Allen gained a magnitude of public support although the measure to lower the age of voting stalled.

A 2025 YouGov poll showed that 25% of Americans were in favor of lowering the voting age, including 35% of respondents age 18–29.

==== Youth voting at the local level ====
In 2013, the City of Takoma Park, Maryland, became the first place in the United States to lower its voting age to 16 for municipal elections and referendums. As of 2024, Greenbelt, Hyattsville, Riverdale Park, Mount Rainier, Somerset, Cheverly and Chevy Chase had followed suit. Brattleboro, Vermont has implemented a similar measure despite a veto attempt by the governor.

Starting in 2024, 16 and 17-year-olds can vote on School Board races in Berkeley, Oakland and Newark.

In Massachusetts, the state has blocked efforts to lower the voting age for local elections to 16 in Ashfield, Boston, Brookline, Cambridge, Concord, Harwich, Lowell, Northampton, Shelburne, Somerville, and Wendell.

==== Debate on increasing the voting age ====
During the 2024 Republican Party presidential primaries, Vivek Ramaswamy announced that he favored raising the voting age to 25 in most circumstances. The policy change, which would have to be done through a constitutional amendment, would only allow for citizens between 18 and 24 to vote if they are enlisted in the military, work as first-responder personnel, or pass a civics test.

A 2025 YouGov poll showed that 19% of Americans were in favor of raising the minimum voting age, including 25% of respondents age 65+ and 31% of Republicans.

=== Venezuela ===
A request to lower the voting age to 16 was made during consideration of revisions to the Constitution of Venezuela in 2007. Cilia Flores, president of the National Assembly, announced that the Mixed Committee for Constitutional Reform had found the idea acceptable. Following approval in the legislature the amendment formed part of the package of constitutional proposals, and was defeated in the 2007 referendum.

== Maximum voting age ==
There are occasional calls for a maximum voting age, on the grounds that older people have less of a stake in the future of the country or jurisdiction. The only jurisdiction with a maximum voting age is the Vatican City State, whose sovereign, the Pope, is elected by the College of Cardinals. A Cardinal must be below the age of 80 on the date of the previous Pope's death or resignation, in order to vote to elect a new Pope.

A 2025 YouGov poll showed that 18% of Americans supported a maximum voting age while 82% were opposed; 25% of respondents age 18–29 were in favor compared to 7% age 65+, while there was no significant difference in support between political parties.

== List by country ==
18 is the most common voting age. In some countries and territories 16 or 17 year-olds can vote in at least some elections. Examples of places with full enfranchisement for those aged 16 or 17 include Argentina, Austria, Brazil, Cuba, Ecuador, Nicaragua, East Timor, Greece, and Indonesia.

Minimum voting age by country No elections age 25 age 21 age 20 age 19 age 18 age 17 age 16 Unknown/No data

The following is an alphabetical list of voting ages in the various countries and territories of the world.

Country	Age	Comment
Afghanistan	N/A	No elections.
Albania	18	
Alderney	16	
Algeria	18	
American Samoa	18	
Andorra	18	
Angola	18	
Anguilla	18	
Antigua and Barbuda	18	
Argentina	16	Compulsory between 18 and 70. However, persons 15 years of age are permitted to vote in primary elections if they will be 16 years of age on or before the day of the general election.
Armenia	18	
Aruba	18	
Australia	18	Compulsory.
Austria	16	
Azerbaijan	18	
Bahamas	18	
Bahrain	20	
Bangladesh	18	
Barbados	18	
Belarus	18	
Belgium	18	16 in European elections since 2023.
Belize	18	
Benin	18	
Bermuda	18	
Bhutan	18	
Bolivia	18	
Bosnia and Herzegovina	18	16 if employed.
Botswana	18	
Brazil	16	Compulsory for 18 to 70; optional for illiterate citizens. Military conscripts cannot vote by law.
British Virgin Islands	18	
Brunei	18	Village elections only.
Bulgaria	18	
Burkina Faso	18	
Burundi	18	
Cambodia	18	
Cameroon	20	
Canada	18	
Cape Verde	18	
Cayman Islands	18	
Central African Republic	18	
Chad	18	
Chile	18	
China	18	
Cocos (Keeling) Islands	18	
Colombia	18	
Comoros	18	
Democratic Republic of the Congo	18	
Republic of the Congo	18	
Cook Islands	18	
Costa Rica	18	
Croatia	18	
Cuba	16	
Curaçao	18	
Cyprus	17	
Czech Republic	18	
Denmark	18	
Djibouti	18	
Dominica	18	
Dominican Republic	18	Married persons regardless of age (members of the armed forces and national police cannot vote).
Ecuador	16	Universal, compulsory for literate persons ages 18–65, optional for other eligible voters.
Egypt	18	
El Salvador	18	
Equatorial Guinea	18	
Eritrea	18	
Estonia	18	16 for local elections.
Eswatini	18	
Ethiopia	18	
Falkland Islands	18	
Faroe Islands	18	
Fiji	18	As of 2013 Constitution.
Finland	18	
France	18	
French Guiana	18	
French Polynesia	18	
Gabon	18	
Gambia	18	
Georgia	18	
Germany	18	Voting age 16 for state elections: Baden-Württemberg, Berlin, Brandenburg, Bremen, Hamburg, Mecklenburg-Vorpommern and Schleswig-Holstein. Voting age 16 for municipal elections: Baden-Württemberg, Berlin, Brandenburg, Bremen, Hamburg, Mecklenburg-Vorpommern, Lower Saxony, North Rhine-Westphalia, Saxony-Anhalt, Schleswig-Holstein and Thuringia. 16 in European elections
Ghana	18	
Gibraltar	18	Universal, plus other British citizens who have been residents six months or more
Greece	17	17 from July 2016 onwards, was 18 prior. People that turn 17 in the year of the elections can also vote. This means that if a 16-year-old teen was born on the last day of 2010, they can vote in an election taking place in 2027.
Greenland	18	
Grenada	18	
Guadeloupe	18	
Guam	18	US citizens, but do not vote in US presidential elections.
Guatemala	18	Active-duty members of the armed forces may not vote and are restricted to their barracks on election day.
Guernsey	16	
Guinea	18	
Guinea-Bissau	18	
Guyana	18	
Haiti	18	
Honduras	18	
Hong Kong	18	Direct election 18 years of age; universal for permanent residents living in the territory of Hong Kong for the past seven years; indirect election limited to about 220,000 members of functional constituencies and a 1,200-member election committee drawn from broad regional groupings, municipal organizations, and central government bodies.
Hungary	18	16 if married.
Iceland	18	Since 2022, municipalities can lower the voting age to 16 for referendums.
India	18	
Indonesia	17	No threshold for married persons. The military and police cannot vote.
Iran	18	Changed from 15 to 18 in 2007, returned to 15 in 2009 and returned to 18 in 2011.
Iraq	18	
Ireland	18	
Isle of Man	16	
Israel	18	17 for municipal elections; 17 year olds can also vote in national elections held after their 18th Hebrew calendar birthday.
Italy	18	Lowered from 21 in 1975 for Chamber of Deputies elections and referendums, and from 25 in 2021 for Senate elections.
Ivory Coast	18	
Jamaica	18	
Japan	18	Lowered from 20 in June 2016. The voting age for constitutional referendums was lowered from 20 to 18 in June 2018.
Jersey	16	
Jordan	18	
Kazakhstan	18	
Kenya	18	
Kiribati	18	
Kosovo	18	
Kuwait	21	For those not in the military or police forces; all voters must have been citizens for 20 years. Proposed in 2012 to be reduced to 18.
Kyrgyzstan	18	
Laos	18	
Latvia	18	
Lebanon	21	All men and women regardless of religion. Excludes convicts, imprisoned citizens, and military/security service personnel.
Lesotho	18	
Liberia	18	
Libya	18	
Liechtenstein	18	Compulsory.
Lithuania	18	
Luxembourg	18	Compulsory until the age of 75. A proposal to lower the voting age to 16 was rejected in 2015 in a nationwide referendum (81% "no"-votes).
Macau	18	Direct election 18 years of age, universal for permanent residents living in Macau for the past seven years; indirect election limited to organizations registered as "corporate voters" (973 are currently registered) and a 300-member Election Committee drawn from broad regional groupings, municipal organizations, and central government bodies.
Madagascar	18	
North Korea	17	Members of the military have the right to vote, regardless of age.
North Macedonia	18	
Malawi	18	
Malaysia	18	Lowered from 21 in 2019 however did not take effect until 15 December 2021.
Maldives	18	
Mali	18	
Malta	16	
Marshall Islands	18	
Martinique	18	
Mauritania	18	
Mauritius	18	
Mayotte	18	
Mexico	18	
Federated States of Micronesia	18	
Moldova	18	
Monaco	18	
Mongolia	18	
Montenegro	18	
Montserrat	18	
Morocco	18	
Mozambique	18	
Myanmar	18	
Namibia	18	
Nauru	20	
Nepal	16	
Netherlands	18	
New Caledonia	18	
New Zealand	18	
Nicaragua	16	
Niger	18	
Nigeria	18	
Niue	18	
Norfolk Island	18	
North Macedonia	18	
Northern Cyprus	18	
Northern Mariana Islands	18	Indigenous inhabitants are US citizens but do not vote in US presidential elections.
Norway	18	However, persons 17 years of age are permitted to vote in parliamentary elections if they will be 18 years of age in the year the election is held.
Oman	21	Except for members of the military and police.
Pakistan	18	Reserved parliamentary seats for women and non-Muslims.
Palau	18	
Palestine	18	West Bank and Gaza.
Panama	18	
Papua New Guinea	18	
Paraguay	18	
Peru	18	Universal and compulsory until the age of 70; (members of the military and national police could not vote until a Constitutional Reform in 2005).
Philippines	18	For youth councils: 15 to 30.
Pitcairn Islands	18	Universal with three years' residency.
Poland	18	
Portugal	18	
Puerto Rico	18	Island residents are US citizens but do not vote in US presidential elections. 16-year-olds may vote in local elections.
Qatar	18	Naturalized citizens cannot vote.
Réunion	18	
Romania	18	Planned lowering of the voting age to 16 (for local elections and for European Parliament elections) is currently underway and has been approved by the Senate in early September 2022. However the government opposes the decision as "unconstitutional". Brought into debate by the Romanian Students' Union in March 2022.
Russia	18	
Rwanda	18	
Saint Helena	18	
Saint Kitts and Nevis	18	
Saint Lucia	18	
Saint Pierre and Miquelon	18	
Saint Vincent and the Grenadines	18	
Samoa	21	
San Marino	18	
São Tomé and Príncipe	18	
Sark	16	
Saudi Arabia	18	
Senegal	18	
Serbia	18	16 if employed.
Seychelles	18	
Sierra Leone	18	
Singapore	21	
Sint Maarten	18	
Slovakia	18	
Slovenia	18	
Solomon Islands	18	
Somalia	18	Universal suffrage starting with 24 June 2024 local elections.
South Africa	18	
South Korea	18	Lowered from 19 in December 2019.
South Sudan	18	
Spain	18	
Sri Lanka	18	
Sudan	18	
Suriname	18	
Sweden	18	
Switzerland	18	16 for cantonal and municipal elections in the canton of Glarus.
Syria	18	
Taiwan	20	18 for referendums (since 2017). On November 26, 2022, a constitutional referendum was held in order to lower the voting age from 20 to 18 years. Although a majority of votes were obtained in favor of lowering the voting age, the threshold of half the eligible voters was not reached and the referendum was declared unsuccessful.
Tajikistan	18	
Tanzania	18	
Thailand	18	Being a Thai citizen since birth, or at least five years.
Timor-Leste	17	
Togo	18	
Tokelau	21	
Tonga	21	
Trinidad and Tobago	18	
Tunisia	18	With some exceptions.
Turkey	18	
Turkmenistan	18	
Turks and Caicos Islands	18	
Tuvalu	18	
Uganda	18	
Ukraine	18	
United Arab Emirates	N/A	Elections for the Federal National Council are voted on by members of each emirate's electoral college. Electoral college members are selected by the ruler of each emirate, but must be at least 25 to stand as a candidate for election, and there must be at least 300 members for every seat allocated to each emirate.
United Kingdom	16 / 18	18 for general elections to the House of Commons, Northern Ireland Assembly and local government elections in England and Northern Ireland. 16 for all Scottish elections, including Scottish Parliament elections, Scottish local government elections, and the Scottish Independence Referendum. 16 for Senedd (Welsh Parliament) elections and Welsh local elections. The government has announced plans to reduce the voting age to 16 for all elections by the next general election.
United States	18	However, in many states, persons 17 years of age are permitted to vote in primary elections if they will be 18 years of age on or before the day of the general election. Some municipalities allow 16-year-olds to vote in local elections.
Uruguay	18	
Uzbekistan	18	
Vatican City	< 80	Election of the pope is limited to cardinals under 80.
Vanuatu	18	
Venezuela	18	
Vietnam	18	
United States Virgin Islands	18	Island residents are U.S. citizens but do not vote in U.S. presidential elections.
Wallis and Futuna	18	
Western Sahara	N/A	
Yemen	18	
Zambia	18	
Zimbabwe	18	

== Chronology of lowering the voting age to 18 ==
The following is a chronological list of the dates upon which countries lowered the voting age to 18; unless otherwise indicated, the reduction was from 21. In some cases the age was lowered decrementally, and so the "staging points" are also given. Some information is also included on the relevant legal instruments involved.

- 1863: Argentina (Previously 21 per the Law 140 of 1857, reduced to 18 with the Law 75/1863)
- 1924: Turkey (Previously 25 per the 1876 constitution, reduced to 18 with the 1924 constitution. It was again raised to 22 on 5 December 1934 while granting full women's suffrage, and gradually lowered to 21 in 1961, 20 in 1987 and 18 again in 1995)
- 1946: Czechoslovakia
- 1949: Israel (under Mandatory Palestine, the Yishuv's voting age was 21 for Assembly of Representatives elections)
- 1952: Poland
- 1958: South Africa (white voters only; Electoral Law Amendment Act, 1958)
- 1969
  - United Kingdom
    - Representation of the People Act 1969 in relation to local elections in Great Britain and elections to the Parliament of the United Kingdom (Note: The 1970 United Kingdom general election is the first in which this Act had effect.)
    - Electoral Law Act (Northern Ireland) 1969 in relation to local elections in Northern Ireland and elections to the Parliament of Northern Ireland
- 1970
  - Canada (June 26) for federal elections, via amendment to Canada Elections Act.
  - West Germany
- 1971
  - Netherlands (previous reduction from 23 to 21 in 1965)
  - United States (1 July), per the Twenty-sixth Amendment. Previously reduced on 1 January 1971 by the Voting Rights Act Amendments 1970, ss. 302, 305 (Prior reductions: Georgia in August 1943, Kentucky in 1955, Guam in 1954 and American Samoa in 1965.)
- 1972: Finland (from 20; previous reductions were 24 to 21 in 1944 and 21 to 20 in 1968/1969)
- 1973
  - Ireland (5 January) via 4th Amendment of the Constitution. Women under 30 gained the vote in local elections in 1935 and in Dáil elections and referendums in 1922 (Constitution of the Irish Free State). The only popular election (in 1925) to the Free State Seanad had a voting age of 30.
  - Philippines (17 January): after the 1973 constitution was announced to have been approved in a plebiscite. Among other things, the new constitution lowered the voting age from 21 to 18.
  - Australia (New South Wales was the first state to do so, in 1970)
- 1974
  - France (July 5) (Act No. 74-631)
  - New Zealand: (November) (from 20; previous reduction from 21 to 20 in 1969)
  - Australia
  - Dominica
- 1975
  - Sweden (Increased from 21 to 24 in 1911, then lowered to 23 in 1921, 21 in 1945, 20 in 1965, 19 in 1968 and finally to 18 in 1975)
  - Italy (lowered from 21; this reduction did not apply to Senate elections)
- 1976: Trinidad and Tobago
- 1978
  - Denmark (19 September) (from 20; 53.8% in referendum; previous reductions were 25 to 23 in 1953, 23 to 21 in 1961 and 21 to 20 in 1971)
  - Spain (29 December) (1978 Constitution)
- 1979: Peru
- 1981: Belgium
- 1984: Iceland (from 20; L. 66/1984)
- 1989: India (28 March) (61st Constitution Amendment Act, 1988 read with Act 21 of 1989)
- 1991: Switzerland (from 20; referendum held on 3 March)
- 1992
  - Austria (from 19; previous reductions were 21 to 20 in 1949 and 20 to 19 in 1970)
  - Estonia: (29 July) (from 22, according to the 1938 Constitution; was 18 during the Soviet Occupation since 1940 and 16 for the Congress of Estonia in 1990)
- 1995: Hong Kong (from 21)
- 2000: Liechtenstein (from 20; LGBl. 2000 No. 55)
- 2001: Jordan (July) (from 19; Provisional Election Law No. 34/2001)
- 2002
  - Pakistan (21 August) (Legal Framework Order, 2002), was 18 under 1973 Constitution, then increased to 21, then lowered back to 18.
  - Morocco (11 December) (from 20)
- 2012: Uzbekistan (July) (from 25)
- 2015: Saudi Arabia (July) (from 21)
- 2016: Japan (from 20)
- 2019
  - Malaysia (16 July) (from 21)
  - South Korea (27 December) (from 19)
- 2021:
  - Italy (4 November); lowered from 25 for Senate elections (Constitutional Law No. 1 of 2021)

== Chronology of lowering the voting age to 16 ==
This is a further list, similar to the above but of the dates upon which countries or territories lowered the voting age to 16; unless otherwise indicated, the reduction was from 18.

=== 1980s ===
- Nicaragua: November 1984 (from 21)
- Brazil: 1988, first allowed in the 1989 presidential election (Constitution of the Federative Republic of Brazil, 1988)

=== 1990s ===
- Estonia: 24 February 1990 (from 22 according to the 1938 Constitution, from 18 during the Soviet occupation); only for the Congress of Estonia, was raised to 18 according to the 1992 Constitution

=== 2000s ===
- Isle of Man: 11 July 2006; legislation brought into force in time for general election held on 23 November 2006
- Austria: 1 July 2007 (BGBl. No. 1/1930, as amended)
- Guernsey: 19 December 2007 (Reform (Guernsey) (Amendment) Law, 2007)
- Jersey: 1 April 2008 (Public Elections (Amendment No. 2) (Jersey) Law 2008)
- Ecuador: 28 September 2008 (New constitution accepted by referendum) for general election on 26 March 2009.

=== 2010s ===
- Argentina: 1 November 2012. Voting for teenagers between 16 and 18 years of age became optional.
- Malta: 20 November 2013. Motion passed in parliament to lower the voting age to 16 at local council elections starting from 2015.
- Scotland: 18 September 2014. 16- and 17-year-olds were given the vote for the independence referendum. This was subsequently extended permanently through subsequent legislation ahead of the 2016 Parliament election.
- Estonia: 6 May 2015, in local elections only.

=== 2020s ===
- Wales: 6 May 2021, for the elections to the Senedd (formerly the National Assembly for Wales). The Welsh Government has also legislated the enfranchisement of 16 and 17-year-olds in local government elections by May 2022 for the local Welsh elections.
- Alderney: 22 September 2022.
- Sark: 2022.

== Organizations for voting age reform ==
The following are political parties and other campaigning organizations that have either endorsed a lower voting age or who favor its removal entirely.

=== Active ===
==== Albania ====
- Nisma Thurje

==== Australia ====
- Australian Democrats
- Australian Greens
- Fusion Party
- Socialist Alliance
- Victorian Socialists

==== Bangladesh ====
- National Citizen Party

==== Belgium ====
- Anders
- Christian Democratic and Flemish
- Ecolo
- Groen
- Jeunes MR
- Vooruit
- Workers' Party

==== Canada ====
- Canadian Coalition for the Rights of Children
- Communist Party
- Green Party
- Green Party of British Columbia
- Green Party of Manitoba
- Green Party of Nova Scotia
- Green Party of Ontario
- Green Party of Quebec
- New Democratic Party
- Ontario Liberal Party
- Parti Québécois
- Québec solidaire

==== Chile ====
- Communist Party

==== Colombia ====
- Alternative Indigenous and Social Movement
- Green Alliance

==== Croatia ====
- GONG
- Independent Youth List

==== Czech Republic ====
- Green Party
- Mayors and Independents
- Pirate Party

==== Denmark ====
- Dansk Ungdoms Fællesråd
- Green Left
- Red–Green Alliance
- Social Democrats

==== Estonia ====
- Centre Party
- Estonia 200
- Estonian National Youth Council
- Reform Party
- Social Democratic Party

==== Finland ====
- Finnish National Youth Council and Youth Sector
- Left Alliance

==== France ====
- For a Popular and Social Ecology
- La France Insoumise
- Révolution Permanente
- Socialist Party
- UNICEF France

==== Germany ====
- Alliance 90/The Greens
- Foundation for the Rights of Future Generations
- Krätzä (demanding abolition of any age-based voting restrictions)
- The Left
- Marxist–Leninist Party
- Social Democratic Party

==== Iceland ====
- Left-Green Movement
- National Youth Council of Iceland
- Pirate Party
- Social Democratic Alliance

==== Ireland ====
- Green Party
- Labour Party
- National Youth Council of Ireland
- Ógra Fianna Fáil
- Sinn Féin
- Solidarity

==== Italy ====
- Democratic Party
- Five Star Movement
- Lega Nord

==== Latvia ====
- For Latvia's Development

==== Liechtenstein ====
- Free List

==== Lithuania ====
- Social Democratic Party

==== Luxembourg ====
- Democratic and Liberal Youth
- The Greens
- The Left
- Socialist Workers' Party

==== Mauritius ====
- Mauritian Militant Movement

==== Mexico ====
- Citizens' Movement

==== Morocco ====
- Front of Democratic Forces

==== Namibia ====
- SWAPO Party Youth League

==== Netherlands ====
- BIJ1
- Democrats 66
- LEF – For the New Generation
- Party for the Animals
- Pirate Party
- Volt Netherlands

==== New Zealand ====
- Green Party
- Make It 16
- The Opportunities Party

==== Norway ====
- Green Party
- Labour Party
- Liberal Party
- Norwegian Children and Youth Council
- Red Party
- Socialist Left Party

==== Poland ====
- The Left
- Poland 2050

==== Portugal ====
- Left Bloc
- Liberal Initiative
- LIVRE
- People Animals Nature
- Social Democratic Party

==== Romania ====
- National Liberal Party
- National Union for the Progress of Romania

==== San Marino ====
- RETE Movement

==== Singapore ====
- Workers' Party

==== Slovakia ====
- Christian Union
- For the People

==== Slovenia ====
- Dijaška organizacija Slovenije

==== South Africa ====
- Economic Freedom Fighters

==== South Korea ====
- Korean Teachers and Education Workers Union

==== Spain ====
- Ernai
- Podemos
- Republican Left of Catalonia
- Spanish Socialist Workers' Party
- United Left

==== Sweden ====
- Feminist Initiative
- Green Party
- Left Party
- Youth 2030 Movement

==== Switzerland ====
- Green Liberal Party
- Green Party
- Social Democratic Party
- Solidarity

==== Taiwan ====
- Taiwan Alliance for Advancement of Youth Rights and Welfare

==== Turkey ====
- Communist Party

==== Ukraine ====
- Justice
- Servant of the People

==== United Kingdom ====
- Green Party of England and Wales
- Green Party Northern Ireland
- Labour Party
- Liberal Democrats
- Liberal Party
- National Health Action Party
- Plaid Cymru
- Scottish Conservatives
- Scottish Greens
- Scottish National Party
- Scottish Socialist Party
- Social Democratic and Labour Party
- Ulster Unionist Party
- Votes at 16

==== United States ====
- Common Cause
- FairVote
- Green Party
- National Youth Rights Association
- Peace and Freedom Party
- Vermont Libertarian Party

==== Uruguay ====
- National Party

=== Historical ===
These organizations are either defunct, no longer support a voting age reduction, or are based in countries where the voting age has since been reduced to the organization's desired level.

==== Austria ====
- The Greens – The Green Alternative
- Liberal Forum
- Social Democratic Party

==== Colombia ====
- Commons
- Humane Colombia

==== Malaysia ====
- UNDI18

==== Netherlands ====
- GroenLinks
- Labour Party

==== Turkey ====
- People's Democratic Party

==== United States ====
- Socialist Party USA (voting age mentioned in 2019–2021 platform, removed from 2023–2025)

== See also ==
- Adultcentrism
- Age of candidacy
- Age of majority
- Demeny voting
- Democratization
- Gerontocracy
- Intergenerational equity
- Suffrage
- Voter registration
- Youth
- Youth rights
- Youth suffrage
