= Electoral registration in the United Kingdom =

Electors must be on the electoral register in order to vote in elections and referendums in the UK. Electoral registration officers within local authorities have a duty to compile and maintain accurate electoral registers.

Registration was introduced for all constituencies as a result of the Reform Act 1832, which took effect for the election of the same year. Since 1832, only those registered to vote can do so, and the government invariably runs nonpartisan get out the vote campaigns for each election to expand the franchise as much as possible.

== Current procedure ==
To register to vote a person must be 16 years old or over (but they cannot vote in some elections until they are 18) and resident (usually live) in the UK. In addition, a person must be a British, Irish or European Union citizen, or a Commonwealth citizen who has leave to remain in the UK or who does not require such leave, or a citizen of another country living in Scotland or Wales who has permission to enter or stay in the UK, or who does not need permission.

A person can register at any time of the year. To register, electors should have a fixed address. If an elector wishes to register to vote, but has no fixed address, they may be able to register to vote by completing a declaration of local connection form. This would allow them to register at a place where they are likely to spend a substantial amount of their time.

Regulation 23 of the Representation of the People Regulations 2001 states that the electoral registration officer has the power to require information needed for the purpose of maintaining the electoral register. Any person who fails to give information is liable on summary conviction to a fine.

A person can register anonymously if their safety (or the safety of someone in their household) would be at risk if their name and address appeared on the electoral register. Documentary evidence of a court order or an attestation from an authorised person is required.

=== Individual Electoral Registration ===
'Individual Electoral Registration' (IER) was introduced by the UK government through the Electoral Registration and Administration Act 2013 with the first IER applications being made in England and Wales from 10 June 2014 and in Scotland from 19 September 2014 (the delay in Scotland was due to the Scottish Independence Referendum).

Previously, the 'head of household' was responsible for registering everyone who lived at the address, but now every individual is responsible for their own voter registration. The new system also means that people are now able to register online. Anyone newly registering under the new system will need to register themselves individually by filling out a paper or online form.

In order to register under IER electors are required to provide their date of birth and evidence of their identity, most often a national insurance number.

== History ==
=== Before 1832 ===
Before 1832, the only form of voter registration in the United Kingdom was in the Scottish counties. This consisted of a meeting of potential electors called to determine who was eligible to vote. As the electorate for these seats was extremely small—in 1788, it ranged between 16 electors for Clackmannanshire and 187 for Fife—meetings were an important part of the political process; often, elections were determined by registering or disqualifying electors. In the rest of Britain and Ireland, people who claimed to be qualified voters simply presented themselves at the hustings to vote. If a candidate who lost thought his defeat was due to ineligible voters, he could ask for a scrutiny, which would turn out to be an expensive and lengthy process in large constituencies.

In England land tax lists were sometimes used as substitutes for a register. However, not all qualified voters paid land tax, and eligibility was at the discretion of the returning officer as to who was permitted to vote. The high sheriff of the county, or the mayor of a borough, would often abuse their authority as ex officio returning officers for partisan purposes. A losing candidate could petition the House of Commons if he suspected that the returning officer had abused their power.

In 1788, Parliament attempted to introduce voter registration. The scheme failed—registering only one hundred voters in Lancashire—and was abandoned after a year. Parliament attempted again in 1832, when Sir James Graham introduced legislation that would shift the focus of eligibility to the registration process.

=== Registration process from 1832 ===
Under the Representation of the People Act 1832 (2 & 3 Will. 4. c. 45) the overseers of the poor in each parish, who at that time compiled information relevant to electoral qualifications in order to collect local taxes, were given the additional task of compiling the electoral register. The new act of Parliament required that on 20 June in each year in the counties, the overseers publish a notice calling on prospective voters to make a claim and prove their eligibility to vote. Once an elector had done so, he would be re-listed every time unless his circumstances or eligibility changed. In July, the overseers in the counties would compile a draft register for elections to be held in the coming year. If any elector's eligibility was challenged, the objection was recorded and the elector was given notice to appeal. The list of objections was published during the first two weeks of September.

In the boroughs, the rate-book—which the overseers already compiled—provided a natural basis for the electoral register. An elector who had paid his rates up to the start of the registration period did not need to make a claim, unless there had been a change of address or qualification. By 20 July the assessors and collectors of taxes had to report to the overseers the names of those who were in arrears with payment of their rates. The overseers then compiled a draft electoral register of all those they considered as being qualified to vote. Separate lists of people qualified to vote by virtue of their status as freemen of the borough were prepared by the Town Clerk. The combined lists of all prospective voters were published by the last day of July. Anyone else who claimed to be qualified to vote or who objected was required to give notice to the overseers.

From this point onwards the process for finalising the electoral register was the same for all areas. Barristers (who became known, collectively, as revising barristers) were appointed by senior judges to hold courts which sat from mid-September to the end of October, to revise the lists of voters. These barristers reviewed statements from the officials who had drawn up the lists, from claimants, and from objectors in order to produce the final list of qualified electors. The procedure involved strict compliance with the law and even minor clerical errors could invalidate a claim. A well-qualified person could be put to the time and trouble of defending his vote, even against a worthless objection, because if he did not appear his claim was automatically rejected. This system was difficult and expensive to operate. It encouraged the development of party organisation, as legally qualified agents were needed to defend the claims of party supporters and challenge the eligibility of those supporting opponents. The office of revising barrister was abolished in 1918 when the duties were entrusted to the electoral registration officer.

The dates on which electoral registers came into force were changed from time to time and sometimes varied across different parts of the country: in England and Wales, registers came into force on 1 November between 1832 and 1842, and 1 January between 1844 and 1915. The 1832 system broke down during the First World War: registers were not revised after 1915, and with many voters serving in the armed forces or relocating in order to take up war work, the registers became very outdated.

The passage of the Representation of the People Act 1918, which introduced suffrage for men aged 21 and enfranchised some women from the age of 30, gave the opportunity for revising the process of electoral registration. Responsibility for preparing electoral registers was taken away from the overseers of the poor and given to local authorities. Suffrage was also expanded—or restricted—by following Representation Acts:

- Representation of the People (Equal Franchise) Act 1928, expanding the suffrage to all adults over 21
- Representation of the People Act 1969, expanding the suffrage to all adults over 18
- Representation of the People Act 1983, restricting the right to vote from prisoners
- Representation of the People Act 1985 and 1989, allowing expatriates to vote in the last constituency they lived in for a period of 5 (1985), 20 (1989), and, currently, 15 years (PPERA [2000]) after leaving.
- Representation of the People Act 2000, removing restrictions on postal voting and allowing psychiatric patients to use hospitals as registration addresses.

== Reform ==
Organisations such as the Electoral Reform Society support moving towards automatic voter registration.

== See also ==
- Voter registration campaign
