= Representation of the People Act 1990 =

Act of the Parliament of the United Kingdom

Representation of the People Act 1990 (Note: Section 2(1).)
- Act of Parliament
- Parliament of the United Kingdom
- Long title: An Act to provide for a person no longer resident at his qualifying address or at any other address in the same area to be eligible for an absent vote for an indefinite period at Parliamentary elections in the United Kingdom and local government elections in Great Britain.
- Citation: 1990 c. 32
- Territorial extent: United Kingdom (Note: Section 2(3).)

Dates
- Royal assent: 26 July 1990
- Commencement: 10 June 1991 (Great Britain); 7 August 1991 (Northern Ireland); (Note: Section 2(2). The Representation of the People Act 1990 (Commencement No. 1) Order 1991 (SI 1991/1244) and the Representation of the People Act 1990 (Commencement No. 2) Order 1991 (SI 1991/1686).)
- Repealed: 16 February 2001 (Note: The Representation of the People Act 2000 (Commencement) Order 2001 (SI 2001/116).)
Other legislation
Amends	Representation of the People Act 1985
Repealed by	Representation of the People Act 2000

Status: Repealed

Text of statute as originally enacted

Revised text of statute as amended

The Representation of the People Act 1990 (c. 32) was an act of the Parliament of the United Kingdom which made a minor amendment to the Representation of the People Act 1985. The act allowed a person no longer resident at their qualifying address or at any other address in the same area to be eligible for an absent vote for an indefinite period at Parliamentary elections in the United Kingdom and local government elections in Great Britain.

== Provisions ==
Section 1 of the act amended section 6 of the Representation of the People Act 1985, which provided for an absent vote for an indefinite period, by inserting a new ground in subsection (2), paragraph (aa): that the person was no longer resident at his qualifying address or at any other address in the same area. It also inserted subsection (2A), which provided that two addresses were in the same area only if:

- both were in the same parliamentary constituency in Greater London or in the same parliamentary constituency in a metropolitan county in England;
- both were in the same electoral division of a non-metropolitan county in England and, if either was in a parish, in the same parish;
- both were in the same electoral division of a county in Wales and in the same community;
- both were in the same electoral division in Scotland; or
- both were in the same ward in Northern Ireland.

Section 2 of the act provided the short title, and that the act was to be included among the Representation of the People Acts. It came into force on a day appointed by the Secretary of State by order, with different days for different purposes, and extended to Northern Ireland.

== Subsequent developments ==
The whole act was repealed by section 15 of, and schedule 7 to, the Representation of the People Act 2000, which came into force on 16 February 2001.

== See also ==
- Reform Acts
- Representation of the People Act
