= 1961 Danish electoral age referendum =

30 May 1961
- Lowering the voting age from 23 to 21

Results
Choice	Votes	%
Yes	586,113	55.02%
No	479,146	44.98%
Valid votes	1,065,259	99.13%
Invalid or blank votes	9,299	0.87%
Total votes	1,074,558	100.00%
Registered voters/turnout	2,880,337	37.31%

A referendum on reducing the voting age from 23 to 21 was held in Denmark on 30 May 1961. It was approved by 55% of voters with a 37.3% turnout.

The electoral age in Denmark had previously been lowered from 25 to 23 in a 1953 referendum, and was further reduced to 20 years following a 1971 referendum and finally to 18 years following a 1978 referendum.

== Results ==
Choice	Votes	%
For	586,113	55.0
Against	479,146	45.0
Invalid/blank votes	9,299	–
Total	1,074,558	100
Registered voters/turnout	2,880,337	37.3
Source: Nohlen & Stöver
