= Representation of the People Bill =

Proposed law of the United Kingdom

- Bill
- Parliament of the United Kingdom
- Long title: A Bill to Make provision extending the right to vote to 16 and 17 year olds; to make provision about the registration of voters; to make provision about the administration and conduct of elections, referendums and recall petitions; to make provision about election agents’ addresses; to make provision about political expenditure and political donations; to make provision about information to be included in electronic campaigning material; to make provision about offences and civil sanctions in connection with elections, referendums and recall petitions and with donations and expenditure for political purposes; to make provision about the disclosure of information by the Electoral Commission; to make provision about the disqualification of offenders for holding elective offices, and their sentencing, where offences are aggravated by hostility towards persons involved in elections, referendums or recall petitions or holders of such offices; and for connected purposes.
- Introduced by: Steve Reed, Secretary of State for Housing, Communities and Local Government (Commons)
- Territorial extent: United Kingdom

Other legislation
- Amends: Electoral Law (Northern Ireland) Act 1962; Representation of the People Act 1983; Representation of the People Act 1985; Local Elections (Northern Ireland) Order 1985 (SI 1985/454); Representation of the People Act 1989; Political Parties, Elections and Referendums Act 2000; Representation of the People Act 2000; Elections Act 2022

Status: Pending

History of passage through Parliament

The Representation of the People Bill is a bill of the Parliament of the United Kingdom. The bill, if passed, will reduce the voting age in the United Kingdom from 18 years old to 16 years old, expand accepted voter ID, and expand the powers of the Electoral Commission.

The bill implements the government white paper Restoring trust in our democracy: Our strategy for modern and secure elections and introduces a lowered voting age, automatic voter registration, requires ID for candidate nominations, extends the range of acceptable voter ID to include bank cards, and makes a number of changes to campaign finance and imprints, as well as expanding the Electoral Commission's powers by extending its enforcement powers to include "candidate, local third party campaigner and recall petition campaigner political finance offences" and removing the government’s ability to set its strategic direction. The bill also creates stronger legal consequences for electoral intimidation and harassment, with courts gaining greater sentencing powers in such cases.
