= Electoral Law Amendment Act, 1958 =

Act which reduced the voting age in South Africa from 21 to 18

Parliament of South Africa
- Long title: Act to amend the Electoral Consolidation Act, 1946.
- Citation: Act No. 30 of 1958
- Enacted by: Parliament of South Africa
- Royal assent: 11 September 1958
- Commenced: 15 September 1958
- Repealed: 1 February 1980

Repealed by
- Electoral Act, 1979

Related legislation
- Electoral Consolidation Act, 1946

Summary
- Reduced the voting age for white voters from 21 to 18.
- Status: Repealed

The Electoral Law Amendment Act, 1958 (Act No. 30 of 1958) was an act of the Parliament of South Africa which reduced the voting age for white voters from 21 to 18. It did not reduce the voting age for black and coloured voters (under the Representation of Natives Act and the Separate Representation of Voters Act respectively) and hence had the effect of further reducing their (already limited) electoral power.

The act came into force on 15 September 1958. The next subsequent general election of the House of Assembly was held on 8 October 1961. The act took the form of a series of amendments to the Electoral Consolidation Act, 1946, and was therefore repealed on 1 February 1980 when that act was repealed and replaced by the Electoral Act, 1979.
