= Representation of the People (Scotland) Act 1868 =

Act of the Parliament of the United Kingdom reforming the electoral system in Scotland

Representation of the People (Scotland) Act 1868 (Note: Section 1.)
- Act of Parliament
- Parliament of the United Kingdom
- Long title: An Act for the Amendment of the Representation of the People in Scotland.
- Citation: 31 & 32 Vict. c. 48
- Territorial extent: Scotland (Note: Section 2.)

Dates
- Royal assent: 13 July 1868
- Commencement: 1 January 1868 (Note: Section 3.)
Other legislation
Amended by	Statute Law Revision Act 1875; House Occupiers in Counties Disqualification Removal (Scotland) Act 1880; Representation of the People Act 1918; Representation of the People Act 1948; Representation of the People Act 1949
Relates to	Representation of the People Act 1867; Representation of the People (Ireland) Act 1868

Status: Amended

Text of statute as originally enacted

Revised text of statute as amended

Text of the Representation of the People (Scotland) Act 1868 as in force today (including any amendments) within the United Kingdom, from legislation.gov.uk.

The Representation of the People (Scotland) Act 1868 (31 & 32 Vict. c. 48) is an act of the Parliament of the United Kingdom. It carried on from the Representation of the People Act 1867 (30 & 31 Vict. c. 102), and created seven additional Scottish seats in the House of Commons at the expense of seven English borough constituencies, which were disenfranchised.

Two University constituencies were created; Edinburgh and St Andrews Universities and Glasgow and Aberdeen Universities. These each returned one member to Parliament. Two burgh constituencies received an additional member; these were Glasgow (raised to 3 members) and Dundee (raised to 2). A third burgh constituency, Hawick Burghs, was newly created, receiving one member. Three county constituencies each received one additional member, and were split in half accordingly; these were Lanarkshire, Ayrshire and Aberdeenshire.

This totalled eight new seats, and accordingly the county constituencies of Selkirkshire and Peeblesshire were merged to form Peebles and Selkirk, returning one member, for a net increase of seven seats.

This was offset by the disenfranchisement of Arundel, Ashburton, Dartmouth, Honiton, Lyme Regis, Thetford and Wells, all English borough constituencies, leaving the overall number of seats in the House unchanged.

== Subsequent developments ==
Section 3 of the act was repealed by section 175(1) of, and the ninth schedule to, the Representation of the People Act 1949 (12, 13 & 14 Geo. 6. c. 68), which came into force on 3 April 150.

== See also ==
- Reform Acts
- Representation of the People Act

== Bibliography ==
- Paterson (ed). The Practical Statutes of the Session 1868. Horace Cox. London. 1868. Page 135
- Lawson, William. Notes of Decisions Under the Representation of the People Acts and the Registration Acts, 1885–1893, Inclusive. Alex Thom & Co. Dublin. Stevens and Sons. London. 1894. Pages 149 and 164.
- "Registration Cases" (1868) 6 Scottish Law Reporter 28 to 53 and 98 to 107. See also other volumes of these reports.
- (1908) 124 The Law Times 123
- Moore's Almanack improved: or Will's farmer's and countryman's calendar for the year 1869
