= 1969 Danish electoral age referendum =

| 24 June 1969 |
- Lowering the voting age from 21 to 18

Results
| Choice | Votes | % |
|---|---|---|
| Yes | 448,726 | 21.41% |
| No | 1,646,685 | 78.59% |
| Valid votes | 2,095,411 | 99.60% |
| Invalid or blank votes | 8,443 | 0.40% |
| Total votes | 2,103,854 | 100.00% |
| Registered voters/turnout | 3,309,551 | 63.57% |

A referendum on lowering the voting age from 21 to 18 was held in Denmark on 24 June 1969. The proposed change was rejected by 78.6% of voters with a turnout of 63.6%. Two years later, the electoral age was instead lowered to 20 years, and finally, after a 1978 referendum, to 18 years.

== Results ==
| Choice | Votes | % |
|---|---|---|
| For | 448,726 | 21.4 |
| Against | 1,646,685 | 78.6 |
| Invalid/blank votes | 8,443 | – |
| Total | 2,103,854 | 100 |
| Registered voters/turnout | 3,309,551 | 63.6 |
Source: Nohlen & Stöver
