= Reform Acts =

United Kingdom laws reforming the electoral system

The Reform Acts (or Reform Bills, before they were passed) are legislation enacted in the United Kingdom in the 19th and 20th century to enfranchise new groups of voters and to redistribute seats in the House of Commons of the Parliament of the United Kingdom. When short titles were introduced for these acts, they were usually Representation of the People Act.

These began with the Reform Act 1832, Reform Act 1867, and the Representation of the People Act 1884, to increase the electorate for the House of Commons and remove certain inequalities in representation. The bill of 1832 disfranchised many boroughs which enjoyed undue representation and increased that of the large towns, at the same time extending the franchise. It was put through Parliament by the Whigs. The bill of 1867 was passed by the Conservatives under the urging of the Liberals, while that of 1882 was introduced by the Liberals and passed in 1884. These latter two bills provided for a more democratic representation.

Following the First World War, the Reform Act 1918 was enacted with cross-party unanimity. It enfranchised all men over the age of 21 and women over the age of 30. Ten years later, the Reform Act 1928, passed by the Conservatives, resulted in universal suffrage with a voting age of 21. In 1969, the United Kingdom became the first major democratic country to lower its age of franchise to 18 in the Reform Act 1969 passed by the Labour government.

Internationally, the Parliament of the United Kingdom and its Westminster system played a "vanguard role" with worldwide influence on the spread of democracy, thus it is often known as "The mother of parliaments".

== Background ==
Percentage of the population of the United Kingdom registered to vote at general elections, 1832–2010

In the United Kingdom of Great Britain and Ireland, before 1832, fewer than one adult male in ten was eligible to vote in parliamentary elections. Moreover, the franchise varied a great deal between England (which included Wales), where it was wider, and Scotland and Ireland, where it was narrower. A few boroughs gave the vote to all male householders, but many parliamentary seats were under the control of a small group or sometimes a single rich aristocrat. Reforms had been proposed in the 18th century, both by radicals such as John Wilkes and by more conservative politicians such as William Pitt the Younger. However, there was strong opposition to reform, especially after the outbreak of the French Revolution (1789–1799). The cause was continued after 1792 by the London Corresponding Society.

Eventually, the parliamentary franchise was expanded and made more uniform through a series of Reform Acts beginning with the Great Reform Act in 1832. These acts extended voting rights to previously disenfranchised citizens. Sources refer to up to six "Reform Acts", although the earlier three in 1832, 1867/68 and 1884, are better known by this name. (Note: Various sources, books and texts commonly use this description.) Some other acts related to electoral matters also became known as Reform Acts.

The following acts of Parliament are known as Reform Acts: (Note: For the narrative history see Llewellan Woodward (1961), The Age of Reform, 1815–1870, 2nd ed.; Asa Briggs (1959), The Age of Improvement 1783–1867.)

- Reform Act 1832 (often called the "Great Reform Act" or "First Reform Act"), which applied to England and Wales and gave representation to previously underrepresented urban areas and extended the qualifications for voting.
  - Scottish Reform Act 1832, a similar reform applying to Scotland.
  - Irish Reform Act 1832, a similar reform applying to Ireland.
- Representation of the People Act 1867 (also called the "Second Reform Act"), which widened the franchise and adjusted representation to be more equitable.
  - Representation of the People (Scotland) Act 1868, a similar reform applying to Scotland.
  - Representation of the People (Ireland) Act 1868, a similar reform applying to Ireland.
- Ballot Act 1872 (sometimes called the "Reform Act 1872"), which introduced the secret ballot.
- Corrupt and Illegal Practices Prevention Act 1883 (sometimes called the "Reform Act 1883"), which introduced campaign spending limits.
- Representation of the People Act 1884 (also called the "Third Reform Act"), which allowed people in counties to vote on the same basis as those in towns. Home ownership was the only qualification.
- Redistribution of Seats Act 1885 (sometimes called the "Reform Act 1885"), which split most multi-member constituencies into multiple single-member ones.
- Reform Act 1918 (also called the "Fourth Reform Act"), which abolished property qualifications for men and introduced limited female suffrage, for women over the age of 30.
- Reform Act 1928 (also called the "Fifth Reform Act"), which widened suffrage by giving women electoral equality with men.
- Reform Act 1969 (also called the "Sixth Reform Act"), which lowered the minimum voting age from 21 to 18 for local elections in Great Britain and United Kingdom general elections. The Electoral Law Act (Northern Ireland) 1969 made equivalent changes for local elections in Northern Ireland and Northern Ireland general elections.

There are many other electoral reform acts that changed the electoral system in the United Kingdom. (Note: See the information box at the bottom of the article.) Such legislation typically used "Representation of the People Act" as the short title, by which name the 1918, 1928 and other acts in the 20th century are better known. The title Representation of the People Act was adopted in other countries of, or formerly part of, the British Empire through the spread of the Westminster parliamentary system. The Parliament of the United Kingdom played a "vanguard role" with worldwide influence on the spread of democracy, thus it is often known as "the mother of parliaments".

== Reform Act 1832 ==
The Reform Act 1832 for England and Wales was the most controversial of the electoral reform acts passed by the Parliament. Similar acts were passed the same year for Scotland, and Ireland. They were put through Parliament by the Whigs. The acts reapportioned Parliament in a way fairer to the cities of the old industrial north, which had experienced tremendous growth. The act also did away with most of the "rotten" and "pocket" boroughs such as Old Sarum, which with only seven voters, all controlled by the local squire, was still sending two members to Parliament. This act re-apportioned representation in Parliament, thus making that body more accurately represent the citizens of the country geographically (although still with no party-proportional balance), but also gave the power of voting to those lower in the social and economic scale, for the act extended the right to vote (in the boroughs) to any long-term holders of tenements of at least £10 annual value, adding 217,000 voters to an electorate of 435,000. Annual value here refers to the income that the land could be expected to earn if let, in a year. As many as one man in five, though by some estimates still only one in seven, now had the right to vote.

The agitation preceding and following the First Reform Act made many people consider fundamental issues of society and politics. The bill allowed the middle classes to share power with the upper classes; for many conservatives, this was revolutionary. Some historians argue that this transfer of power achieved in Britain and Ireland what the French Revolution of 1848 eventually achieved in France.

Charles Dickens observed these events at first hand as a shorthand Parliamentary reporter. The novel Middlemarch, by Mary Ann Evans (George Eliot) is set in the 1830s and mentions the struggle over the Reform Bills, though not as a major topic. Eliot's Felix Holt, the Radical, set in 1832, is a novel explicitly about the Great Reform Act.

== Reform Act 1867 ==
The Chartists campaigned from 1838 for a wider reform. The movement petered out in the 1850s, but achieved most of its demands in the longer run. Legislative bills were introduced by the Conservatives under the urging of the Liberals. The Representation of the People Act 1867 for England and Wales, and the Representation of the People (Scotland) Act 1868 and Representation of the People (Ireland) Act 1868 for Scotland and Ireland, extended the right to vote still further down the class ladder. In England and Wales, the reforms added just short of a million voters, including many workingmen, which doubled the electorate to almost two million.

Like the Great Reform Act before it, the Second Reform Act also created major shock waves in contemporary British culture. In works such as Matthew Arnold's Culture and Anarchy and John Ruskin's The Crown of Wild Olive, contemporary authors debated whether the shift of power would create democracy that would, in turn, destroy high culture.

== Reform Act 1884 ==
A further Reform Bill was introduced in 1882 by the Liberals. The Conservative-dominated Lords passed it in 1884, opening the way for its royal proclamation, becoming the Representation of the People Act 1884, the Third Reform Act. It was the first electoral reform act to apply to the United Kingdom as a whole. Only with this act did a majority of adult males gain the right to vote in parliamentary elections. Along with the Redistribution of Seats Act 1885, this tripled the electorate again, giving the vote to most agricultural labourers. (Women were still barred from voting.)

== 1918, 1928 and 1969 Reform Acts ==
By the end of the 19th century and in they early 20th century, voting was coming to be regarded as a right rather than the property of the privileged but the First World War delayed further reforms. After the War, women were granted voting rights with cross-party unanimity in the Representation of the People Act 1918, the Fourth Reform Act, which enfranchised all men aged over 21 and women over 30. This last piece of gender discrimination was eliminated 10 years later by the Representation of the People (Equal Franchise) Act 1928, the Fifth Reform Act, passed by the Conservatives.

The voting age was lowered in 1969 by the Labour government in the Representation of the People Act 1969, the Sixth Reform Act, making Britain the first major democratic nation to extend voting rights to all adults aged 18 or over.

== Modern usage ==
The periodic redrawing of constituency boundaries is now dealt with by a permanent Boundary Commission in each part of the United Kingdom, rather than a Reform Act.

Some people in Britain, mostly associated with the Liberal Democrats political party, have called for a new "Great Reform Act" to introduce electoral changes they favour. These would include lowering the minimum voting age to 16 and introducing proportional representation, which are also supported by the Green Party of England and Wales.

== See also ==
- Elections in the United Kingdom § History
- Corrupt practices
- Electoral Reform Society
- History of the constitution of the United Kingdom
- Parliament in the Making
- Parliamentary franchise in the United Kingdom 1885–1918
- Suffrage § United Kingdom
- Universal suffrage § Dates by country
- Women's suffrage in the United Kingdom
