= Representation of the People Act =

Stock short title used for legislation

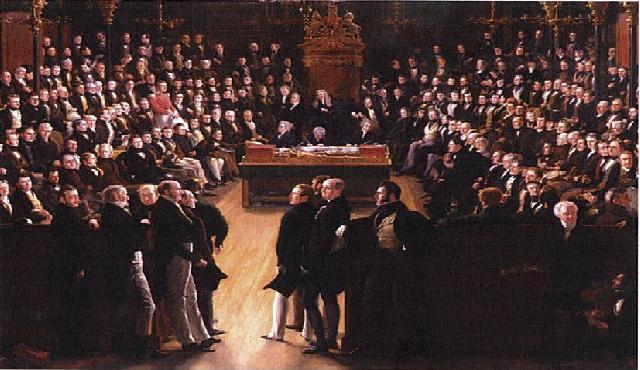

Representation of the People Act is a stock short title used in Antigua and Barbuda, The Bahamas, Bangladesh, Barbados, Belize, Ghana, Grenada, Guyana, India, Jamaica, Mauritius, Pakistan, Saint Vincent and the Grenadines, Trinidad and Tobago, the United Kingdom and Vanuatu for legislation dealing with the electoral system. Representation of the People Acts is a collective title for legislation relating to representation of the people, including Rating Acts and other Registration Acts. The title was first used in the United Kingdom in the Representation of the People Act 1832 and was adopted in other countries of, or formerly part of, the British Empire through the spread of the Westminster parliamentary system.

== Antigua and Barbuda ==
- The Representation of the People Act 1975 (No 19)

== Bahamas ==
- The Representation of the People Act, 1969 (No 40)
- The Representation of the People Amendment Act, 1975 (No 25)
- The Representation of the People (Amendment) Act, 1977 (No 3)
- The Representation of the People Amendment Act, 1981 (No 6)
- The Representation of the People Amendment Act, 1982 (No 1)

== Bangladesh ==
- The Representation of the People Order, 1972
- The Representation of the People Amendment Act, 1981 (XVI)

== Barbados ==
An Act of Barbados passed on 6 June 1840 had the title "An Act to amend the representation of the people of this Island, and to declare who shall be liable to serve on Juries". An Act supplemental to this Act was passed on 30 December 1842.

- The Representation of the People Act, 1891 (No 54) (c 64)
- The Representation of the People (Amendment) Act, 1896 (Act 36)
- The Representation of the People (Amendment) Act, 1897 (Act 6)
- The Representation of the People (Amendment) Act, 1898 (No 13) also called the Representation of the People Act, 1898
- The Representation of the People Act, 1901 (No 2)
- The Representation of the People Act (1951) (No 40)
- The Representation of the People (Amendment) Act, 1953
- The Representation of the People Act, 1955 (No 46)
- The Representation of the People (Amendment) Act, 1956 (No 52)
- The Representation of the People Act, 1957 (No 50)
- The Representation of the People Act, 1971 (No 15)

== Belize ==
- The Representation of the People Ordinance, 1953 (No 13)
- The Representation of the People (Amendment) Ordinance, 1953 (No 25)
- The Representation of the People (Amendment) Ordinance, 1960 (No 8)
- The Representation of the People (Amendment) Ordinance, 1968 (No 8)
- The Representation of the People Ordinance 1978
- The Representation of the People Act 1980

== Ghana ==
- The Representation of the People (Women Members) Act, 1959 (No 72)
- The Representation of the People (Women Members) Act, 1960 (No 8)
- The Representation of the People Decree, 1968 (NLCD 255)
- The Representation of the People (Amendment) Decree, 1968 (NLCD 270)
- The Representation of the People (Amendment) Decree, 1969 (NLCD 350)
- The Representation of the People (Amendment) (No. 2) Decree, 1969 (NLCD 363)
- The Representation of the People (Amendment) Decree, 1979 (SMCD 230)
- The Representation of the People Law, 1992 (PNDCL 284)
- The Representation of the People (Amendment) Law, 1992 (PNDCL 296)

== Grenada ==
- The Representation of the People Act 1993 (No 35) (Cap 286A)

== Guyana ==
- The Representation of the People Ordinance, 1953 (No 5)
- The Representation of the People Ordinance, 1957 (No 3)
- The Representation of the People (Amendment) Ordinance, 1961
- The Representation of the People Act (1964) (Cap 1.03)
- The Representation of the People (Adaptation and Modification of Laws) Act 1968 (No 16)

== India ==
- The Representation of the People Act, 1950 (No 43)
- The Representation of the People Act, 1951 (No 43)
- The Representation of the People (Amendment) Act, 1956 (No 2)
- The Representation of the People (Amendment) Act 1963 (No 2)
- The Representation of the People (Amendment) Act 1966 (No 47)
- The Representation of the People (Amendment) Act, 1975
- The Representation of the People (Amendment) Act, 1992
- The Representation of the People (Amendment) Ordinance 1955 (No 7)
- The Jammu and Kashmir Representation of the People Act, 1957 (Act 4)
- The Jammu and Kashmir Representation of the People (Amendment) Ordinance, 1961 (No 1)
- The Jammu and Kashmir Representation of the People (Amendment) Act, 1982 (No 1)

== Jamaica ==
- The Representation of the People Law, 1944 (Cap 342) (Law 44)
- The Representation of the People (Amendment) Law, 1950 (Law 10)
- The Representation of the People (Amendment) Law, 1955 (Law 44)
- The Representation of the People (Amendment) Law, 1958 (No 44)
- The Representation of the People (Amendment) Act 1963 (No 54)
- The Representation of the People (Special Provisions) (Amendment) Act 1965
- The Representation of the People (Amendment) Act 1966
- The Representation of the People (Official Lists) (Special Provisions) Act 1972 (No 10)
- The Representation of the People (Interim Electoral Reform) Act 1979 (No 20)
- The Representation of the People (Validity of Official List of Electors) Act 1982
- The Representation of the People (Official Lists) (Special Provisions) Act 1983 (No 11)
- The Representation of the People (Interim Electoral Reform) (Amendment) Act 1984
- The Representation of the People (Interim Electoral Reform) (Amendment) Act 1990
- The Representation of the People (Interim Electoral Reform) Amendment Act 1995

== Mauritius ==
- The Representation of the People Act 1958, also called the Representation of the People Ordinance, 1958 (No 14)
- The Representation of the People (Amendment) Ordinance (1960) (No 7)
- The Representation of the People (Amendment) Ordinance (1961) (No 70)
- The Representation of the People (Amendment) Ordinance 1965 (No 40)
- The Representation of the People (Amendment) Act (1968) (No 12)

== Pakistan ==
- The Representation of the People Act, 1957 (No XXXI)
- The Representation of the People Act 1976
- The Representation of the People (Amendment) Act, 1977 (No XVI)
- The Representation of the People (Amendment) Ordinance, 1980 (Ordinance XVII)

== Saint Vincent and the Grenadines ==
- The Representation of the People Act, 1982 (No 7)
- The Representation of the People (Amendment) Act, 1984 (No 8)
- The Representation of the People (Amendment) Act, 1992 (No 10)
- The Representation of the People (Amendment) Act, 1998 (No 1)

== Trinidad and Tobago ==
- The Representation of the People Ordinance, 1961 (No 33)
- The Representation of the People (Amendment) Act, 1966
- The Representation of the People Act 1967 (No 41) (Cap 2:01)
- The Representation of the People (Amendment) Act 2000

== United Kingdom ==
The expression "Act to amend the Representation of the People" appears in the title of the Act that was subsequently given the short title Representation of the People Act 1832, and that act was referred to by that expression in 1832. Some Representation of the People Acts are considered to be Reform Acts. Although it has no special status or priority in law, the Representation of the People Act 1918, dealing with universal voting and other matters of political representation, could be viewed as part of a body of statute law making up the Constitution of the United Kingdom. The title was adopted in other countries of, or formerly part of, the British Empire through the spread of the Westminster parliamentary system.

- The Representation of the People Act 1832 (2 & 3 Will. 4. c. 45)
- The Representation of the People (Scotland) Act 1832 (2 & 3 Will. 4. c. 65)
- The Representation of the People (Ireland) Act 1832 (2 & 3 Will. 4. c. 88)
- The Representation of the People (Scotland) Act 1835 (5 & 6 Will. 4. c. 78)
- The Representation of the People (Ireland) Act 1850 (13 & 14 Vict. c. 69)
- The Representation of the People (Ireland) Act 1861 (24 & 25 Vict. c. 60)
- The Representation of the People Act 1867 (30 & 31 Vict. c. 102)
- The Representation of the People (Scotland) Act 1868 (31 & 32 Vict. c. 48)
- The Representation of the People (Ireland) Act 1868 (31 & 32 Vict. c. 49)
- The Representation of the People Act 1884 (48 & 49 Vict. c. 3)
- The Representation of the People Act 1918 (7 & 8 Geo. 5. c. 64)
- The Representation of the People (Amendment) Act 1918 (8 & 9 Geo. 5. c. 50)
- The Representation of the People (Returning Officers' Expenses) Act 1919 (9 & 10 Geo. 5. c. 8)
- The Representation of the People Act 1920 (10 & 11 Geo. 5. c. 15)
- The Representation of the People (No. 2) Act 1920 (10 & 11 Geo. 5. c. 35)
- The Representation of the People Act 1921 (11 & 12 Geo. 5. c. 34)
- The Representation of the People Act 1922 (12 & 13 Geo. 5. c. 12)
- The Representation of the People (No. 2) Act 1922 (12 & 13 Geo. 5. c. 41)
- The Representation of the People (Economy Provisions) Act 1926 — an alternative citation for Part III of the Economy (Miscellaneous Provisions) Act 1926 (16 & 17 Geo. 5. c. 9)
- The Representation of the People (Equal Franchise) Act 1928 (18 & 19 Geo. 5. c. 12)
- The Representation of the People (Reading University) Act 1928 (18 & 19 Geo. 5. c. 25)
- The Representation of the People Act 1945 (8 & 9 Geo. 6. c. 5)
- The Representation of the People Act 1948 (11 & 12 Geo. 6. c. 65)
- The Representation of the People Act 1949 (12, 13 & 14 Geo. 6. c. 68)
- The Representation of the People (Amendment) Act 1957 (5 & 6 Eliz. 2. c. 43)
- The Representation of the People (Amendment) Act 1958 (7 & 8 Eliz. 2. c. 9)
- The Representation of the People Act 1969 (c. 15)
- The Representation of the People Act 1974 (c. 10)
- The Representation of the People (No. 2) Act 1974 (c. 13)
- The Representation of the People (Armed Forces) Act 1976 (c. 29)
- The Representation of the People Act 1977 (c. 9)
- The Representation of the People Act 1978 (c. 32)
- The Representation of the People Act 1979 (c. 40)
- The Representation of the People Act 1980 (c. 3)
- The Representation of the People Act 1981 (c. 34)
- The Representation of the People Act 1983 (c. 2)
- The Representation of the People Act 1985 (c. 50)
- The Representation of the People Act 1989 (c. 28)
- The Representation of the People Act 1990 (c. 32)
- The Representation of the People Act 1991 (c. 11)
- The Representation of the People Act 1993 (c. 29)
- The Representation of the People Act 2000 (c. 2)

== Vanuatu ==
- The Representation of the People Act 1982 (No 13) (Cap 146)

== See also ==
- Electoral reform
- List of short titles
- Suffrage
- Universal suffrage
