= Representation of the People Act 1989 =

Act of the Parliament of the United Kingdom

Representation of the People Act 1989 (Note: Section 8(1).)
- Act of Parliament
- Parliament of the United Kingdom
- Long title: An Act to amend the law relating to the entitlement of British citizens resident outside the United Kingdom to vote at parliamentary elections and elections to the European Parliament and to increase the maximum amount of candidates’ election expenses at parliamentary by-elections.
- Citation: 1989 c. 28
- Territorial extent: United Kingdom (Note: Section 8(3).)

Dates
- Royal assent: 27 July 1989
- Commencement: 1 September 1989 (except sections 1–4) (Note: Section 8(2). The Representation of the People Act 1989 (Commencement No.1) Order 1989 (SI 1989/1318).); 1 April 1990 (sections 1–4) (Note: Section 8(2). The Representation of the People Act 1989 (Commencement No. 2) Order 1990 (SI 1990/519).)
Other legislation
Amends	Representation of the People Act 1983; Representation of the People Act 1985
Amended by	Representation of the People Act 2000; Political Parties, Elections and Referendums Act 2000

Status: Amended

Text of statute as originally enacted

Revised text of statute as amended

Text of the Representation of the People Act 1989 as in force today (including any amendments) within the United Kingdom, from legislation.gov.uk.

The Representation of the People Act 1989 (c. 28) is an act of the Parliament of the United Kingdom.

== Provisions ==
The act extended the time that a British citizen could have lived abroad and still vote from 5 years to 20 years, and extended this right to people who were too young to vote at the time of leaving Britain.

The act quadrupled the local expenditure limits in order to curtail abuse.

== See also ==
- Reform Acts
- Representation of the People Act
- Representation of the People Act 1969
- Representation of the People Act 1985
