= 1978 Danish electoral age referendum =

Results by nomination district and constituency. Yes: 50–55% 55–60% 60–65% 65–70% 70%+ No: 50–55% 55–60% 60–65% 65–70% 70%+

A referendum on lowering the voting age from 20 to 18 was held in Denmark on 19 September 1978. It was held after the Danish government lowering the age of majority from 20 to 18 in 1976. The change was approved by 53.8% of voters with a turnout of 63.2%. The electoral age had previously been lowered from 21 to 20 in a 1971 referendum, after a 1969 referendum had rejected lowering the electoral age to 18.

== Results ==
| Choice | Votes | % |
|---|---|---|
| For | 1,224,455 | 53.8 |
| Against | 1,049,837 | 46.2 |
| Invalid/blank votes | 8,984 | – |
| Total | 2,283,276 | 100 |
| Registered voters/turnout | 3,615,158 | 63.2 |
Source: Nohlen & Stöver
