= 1971 Danish electoral age referendum =

Referendum

21 September 1971
- Lowering the voting age from 21 to 20

Results
Choice	Votes	%
Yes	1,601,756	56.53%
No	1,231,792	43.47%
Valid votes	2,833,548	97.31%
Invalid or blank votes	78,201	2.69%
Total votes	2,911,749	100.00%
Registered voters/turnout	3,378,087	86.2%
- Yes: 50–55% 55–60% 60–65% 65–70% 70%+ No: 50–55%

A referendum on lowering the voting age from 21 to 20 was held in Denmark on 21 September 1971. The change was approved by 56.5% of voters, with a turnout of 86.2%. A previous referendum had been unsuccessful in lowering the electoral age to 18 years, which was introduced after a 1978 referendum and which still stands.

== Results ==
Choice	Votes	%
For	1,601,756	56.5
Against	1,231,792	43.5
Invalid/blank votes	78,201	–
Total	2,911,749	100
Registered voters/turnout	3,378,087	86.2
Source: Nohlen & Stöver
