= Representation of the People Act 1969 =

Act of the Parliament of the United Kingdom reforming the electoral system

Representation of the People Act 1969 (Note: Section 28.)
- Act of Parliament
- Parliament of the United Kingdom
- Long title: An Act to amend the law about the qualification of electors at elections to the Parliament of the United Kingdom or at local government elections in Great Britain, and the qualification for election to and membership of local authorities in England and Wales, about the conduct of and manner of voting at those elections and about candidates' election expenses thereat, and otherwise to make provision about matters incidental to those elections, and for purposes connected therewith.
- Citation: 1969 c. 15
- Territorial extent: United Kingdom

Dates
- Royal assent: 17 April 1969
- Commencement: various (Note: See § Short title, commencement and extent.)
- Repealed: 15 March 1983 (Note: The Representation of the People Act 1983 (Commencement) Order 1983 (SI 1983/153).)
Other legislation
Amends	Local Government Act 1933; Representation of the People Act 1949; London Government Act 1963
Repeals/revokes	Representation of the People (Amendment) Act 1958
Amended by	Statute Law (Repeals) Act 1976
Repealed by	Representation of the People Act 1983
Relates to	Representation of the People Act 1918

Status: Repealed

Text of statute as originally enacted

The Representation of the People Act 1969 (c. 15) was an act of the Parliament of the United Kingdom that lowered the voting age to 18 years. This statute is sometimes called the Sixth Reform Act.

== Background ==
The 1960s were a period of growing political and cultural demands by young people in Britain, as in other Western democracies. The British political establishment developed a uniquely liberal response, described by Arthur Marwick, a British social historian, as "measured judgement".

== Provisions ==
The act extended suffrage to 18-year-olds, the first democratic nation to lower its age of franchise to include this age group. Previously, only those aged over 21 were permitted to vote.

Section 12 of the act allowed candidates to include on the ballot paper, alongside their name, a six-word description including party or other political affiliation. Previously, the "description" mandated by the Ballot Act 1872 was presumed to indicate profession, occupation, or social rank; political descriptions were deprecated, and definitively prohibited by the Representation of the People Act 1948. The 1969 act did not empower returning officers to challenge the accuracy of the description. The provision (restated in 1983) was exploited by spoiler candidates using descriptions confusingly close to those of major parties; notoriously, the Liberal Democrat candidate lost a 1994 Euro election when Richard Huggett took votes running as a "Literal Democrat". The Registration of Political Parties Act 1998 dealt with this problem by creating a register of political parties.

In local government elections, the act abolished plural voting, except in the City of London.

The act explicitly prohibited prisoners from voting.

=== Short title, commencement and extent ===
Section 27(1) of the act provided that sections 1, 2 and 3 and so far as relates to qualification of voting at local government elections, section 15, of the act, would come into force as to have effect with respect to the registers of electors for the year 1970.

Section 27(2) of the act provided that section 23 of the act so far as it relates to the age for voting at ward elections or to sections 1 or 3 of the act would come into force as to have effect with respect to the ward lists for the year 1970.

Section 27(3) of the act provided that the act would come into force on a day or days appointed by the home secretary by statutory instrument.

Representation of the People Act 1969 (Commencement) Order 1969 (Note: Section 1.)
- Statutory Instrument
- Parliament of the United Kingdom
- Citation: SI 1969/630
- Introduced by: James Callaghan MP (Commons)
- Territorial extent: United Kingdom

Dates
- Made: 29 April 1969
- Laid before Parliament: 9 May 1969
- Commencement: 12 May 1969 (Note: Section 1.)
Other legislation
Made under	Representation of the People Act 1969
Relates to	Representation of the People Act 1969 (Commencement No. 2) Order 1971; Representation of the People Act 1969 (Commencement No. 3) Order 1971

Status: Current legislation

Text of statute as originally enacted

The Representation of the People Act 1969 (Commencement) Order 1969 (SI 1969/630) provided specific commencement dates for acts enactments listed in the schedules to the statutory instrument.

Representation of the People Act 1969 (Commencement No. 2) Order 1971 (Note: Section 1.)
- Statutory Instrument
- Parliament of the United Kingdom
- Citation: SI 1971/544
- Introduced by: Reginald Maudling MP (Commons)
- Territorial extent: United Kingdom

Dates
- Made: 26 March 1971
- Laid before Parliament: 7 April 1971
- Commencement: 1 July 1971 (Note: Section 1.)
Other legislation
Made under	Representation of the People Act 1969
Relates to	Representation of the People Act 1969 (Commencement) Order 1969; Representation of the People Act 1969 (Commencement No. 3) Order 1976

Status: Current legislation

Text of statute as originally enacted

The Representation of the People Act 1969 (Commencement No. 2) Order 1971 (SI 1971/544) provided that section 18(1) of the act would come into force on 1 July 1971.

Representation of the People Act 1969 (Commencement No. 3) Order 1976 (Note: Section 1.)
- Statutory Instrument
- Parliament of the United Kingdom
- Citation: SI 1976/2064
- Introduced by: Merlyn Rees MP (Commons)
- Territorial extent: United Kingdom

Dates
- Made: 30 November 1976
- Laid before Parliament: 10 December 1976
- Commencement: 1 February 1977 (Note: Section 1.)
Other legislation
Made under	Representation of the People Act 1969
Relates to	Representation of the People Act 1969 (Commencement) Order 1969; Representation of the People Act 1969 (Commencement No. 2) Order 1971

Status: Current legislation

Text of statute as originally enacted

The Representation of the People Act 1969 (Commencement No. 3) Order 1976 (SI 1976/2064) provided that the rest of the act would come into force on 1 February 1977, namely paragraph 4 of part II of schedule 2 to the act.

Section 28 of the act provided that the act may be cited as the "Representation of the People Act, 1969" and may be cited as a Representation of the People Act.

== Aftereffects ==
The first election affected by this change of law was the Bridgwater by-election held on 13 March 1970 following the death of the sitting MP. The next general election was on 18 June 1970.

Case law subsequently established the right for undergraduate students to vote in the constituency of their university. This followed an appeal to the High Court.

The approach to the challenge of radical youth culture taken by the UK political establishment, which primarily involved strategies of co-option and compromise, was able to stymie much of the rising social and political tension that convulsed some other liberal democracies in 1968 through to the early 1970s.

The 1969 act, sometimes known as the Sixth Reform Act, did not extend the right to stand as a candidate for election to Parliament to under-21s. The age of candidacy for elections in the United Kingdom was lowered from 21 to 18 in 2006, with the passing of the Electoral Administration Act 2006.

== Subsequent developments ==
The whole act was repealed by section 206 of, and part II of schedule 9 to, the Representation of the People Act 1983, which came into force on 15 March 1983.

== See also ==
- Reform Acts
- Representation of the People Act
- Social history of post-war Britain (1945–1979)

== Bibliography ==
- Gay, Oonagh (1 June 1998). "Registration of Political Parties Bill (Bill 188 1997/98)". House of Commons Library Research Paper (98/62).
