= Representation of the People (Equal Franchise) Act 1928 =

Act of the Parliament of the United Kingdom reforming the electoral system

Representation of the People (Equal Franchise) Act 1928 (Note: Section 8.)
- Act of Parliament
- Parliament of the United Kingdom
- Long title: An Act to assimilate the franchises for men and women in respect of parliamentary and local government elections; and for purposes consequential thereon.
- Citation: 18 & 19 Geo. 5. c. 12
- Territorial extent: United Kingdom

Dates
- Royal assent: 2 July 1928
- Commencement: 2 July 1928 (Note: The Acts of Parliament (Commencement) Act 1793.)
- Repealed: 1 October 1948
Other legislation
Amends	Representation of the People Act 1918
Amended by	Representation of the People Act 1945
Repealed by	Representation of the People Act 1948

Status: Repealed

Text of statute as originally enacted

The Representation of the People (Equal Franchise) Act 1928 (18 & 19 Geo. 5. c. 12) was an act of the Parliament of the United Kingdom. This act expanded on the Representation of the People Act 1918 (7 & 8 Geo. 5. c. 64) which had given some women the vote in Parliamentary elections for the first time after World War I. It is sometimes referred to as the Fifth Reform Act.

The act widened suffrage by giving women electoral equality with men. It gave the vote to all women over 21 years old, regardless of property ownership. Prior to this act only women over 30 who met minimum property qualifications could vote.

== Passing of the act ==
The act was passed by the Conservative Party without much opposition from other parties.

The bill became law on 2 July 1928, having been introduced in March. The leader of the National Union of Women's Suffrage Societies who had campaigned for the vote, Millicent Fawcett, was still alive and attended the parliament session to see the vote take place. She wrote in her diary the same night "It is almost exactly 61 years ago since I heard John Stuart Mill introduce his suffrage amendment to the Reform Bill on 20 May 1867. So I have had extraordinary good luck in having seen the struggle from the beginning.”

On 5 August 1928, Millicent Fawcett obtained a letter from the prime minister Stanley Baldwin. He points out that even though there were obstacles in passing the bill, he always believed it would be ratified in "the simple and complete form it ultimately assumed". He finishes the letter by expressing a hope that equal vote would be beneficial for the country and it would serve for the greater good in the United Kingdom.

== Provisions ==
=== Short title, commencement and extent ===
Section 8(1) of the act provided that the act may be cited as the "Representation of the People (Equal Franchise) Act, 1928" and may be cited as a Representation of the People Act.

Section 8(4) of the act provided that the act would extend to Northern Ireland so far as it relates to matters with respect to which the Parliament of Northern Ireland have no power to make laws.

== Results ==
The act added five million more women to the electoral roll and made women a majority, 52.7%, of the electorate in the 1929 general election, which was termed the "Flapper Election".

== Subsequent developments ==
The whole act was repealed by section 80(7) of, and the thirteenth schedule to, the Representation of the People Act 1948 (11 & 12 Geo. 6. c. 65), which came into force on 30 July 1948.

== See also ==
- Reform Acts
- Timeline of women's suffrage
- Nineteenth Amendment to the United States Constitution
- Women's suffrage in the United Kingdom
- Representation of the People Act
- Suffragette bombing and arson campaign
- Women in the House of Commons of the United Kingdom
