= History of the constitution of the United Kingdom =

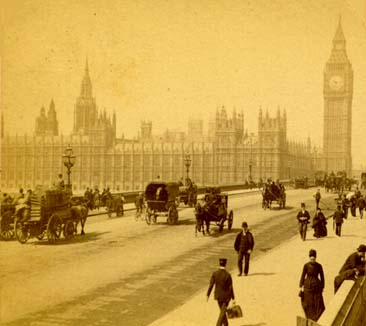
The Palace of Westminster was rebuilt in the 1840s and 1850s. It is considered the mother of parliaments.

The constitution of the United Kingdom is an uncodified constitution made up of various statutes, judicial precedents, convention, treaties and other sources. Beginning in the Middle Ages, the constitution developed gradually in response to various crises. By the 20th century, the British monarchy had become a constitutional and ceremonial monarchy, and Parliament developed into a representative body exercising parliamentary sovereignty.

Initially, the constitutional systems of the four constituent countries of the United Kingdom developed separately under English domination. The Kingdom of England conquered Wales in 1283, but it was only later through the Laws in Wales Acts 1535 and 1542 that the country was brought completely under English law. While technically a separate state, the Kingdom of Ireland was ruled by the English monarchy.

From 1603 to 1707, England and the Kingdom of Scotland shared the same monarch as part of the Union of the Crowns; however, each nation maintained separate governments. In 1707, England and Scotland were joined in the Kingdom of Great Britain. In 1801, Great Britain and Ireland were joined in the United Kingdom of Great Britain and Ireland. Most of Ireland seceded in 1922 creating the present-day United Kingdom of Great Britain and Northern Ireland. While the United Kingdom remains a unitary state in which Parliament is sovereign, a process of devolution began in the 20th and 21st centuries that saw Parliament restore self-government to Scotland, Wales and Northern Ireland.

One of the oldest constitutional systems in the world, dating back over one thousand years, it is characterised by the stability of its governing institutions, its capacity to absorb change, a bicameral legislature and the concept of responsible government. Aspects of the British constitution were adopted in the constitutions and legal systems of other countries around the world, particularly those that were part of, or formerly part of, the British Empire including the United States and the many countries that adopted the Westminster parliamentary system. The British constitution is the source of the modern concepts of the rule of law, parliamentary sovereignty and judicial independence and adoption of British constitutional principles propagated their spread around the world.

== Kingdom of England ==
=== Anglo-Saxon government (800-1066) ===
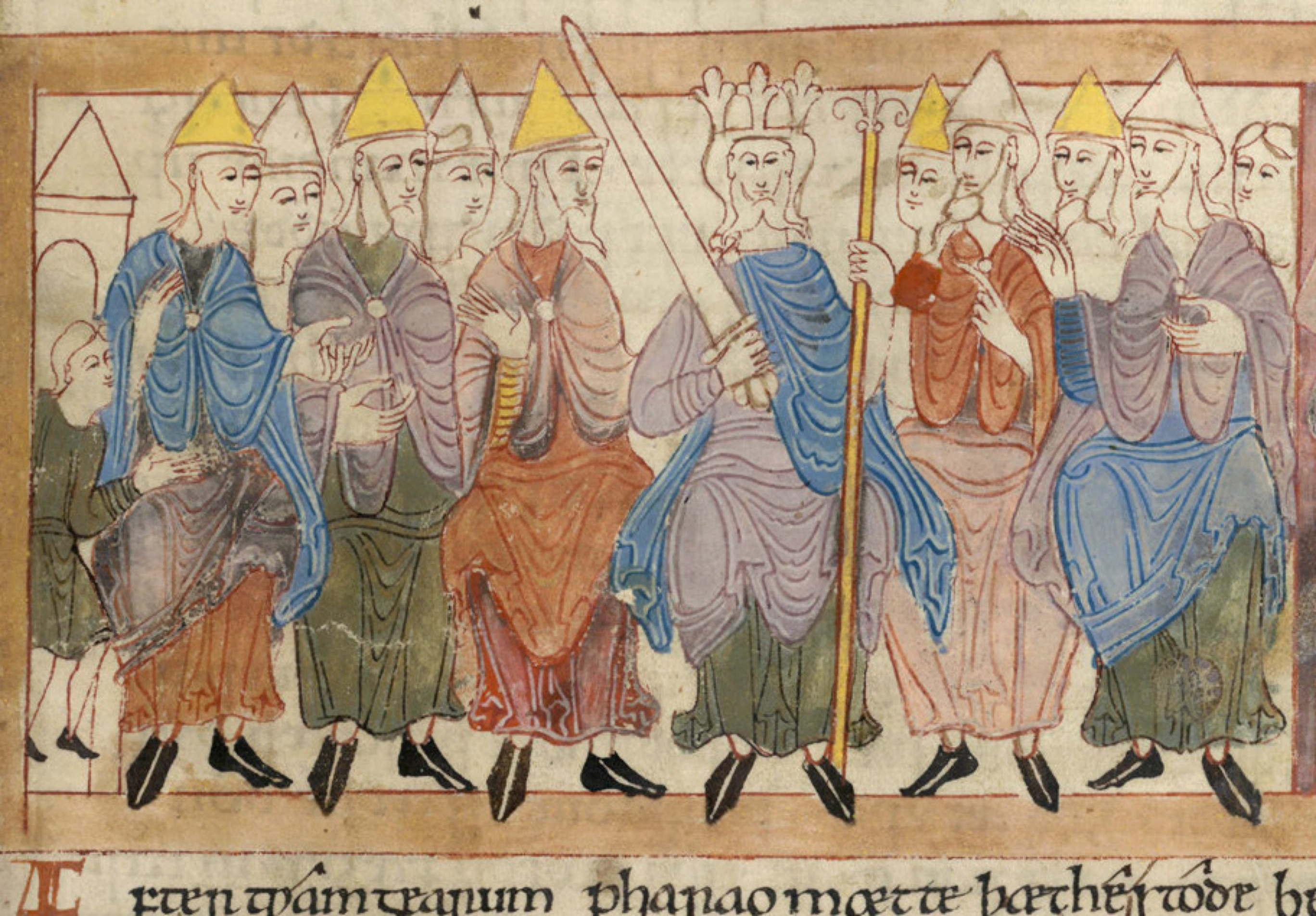
An Anglo-Saxon king with his witan. A biblical scene in the Illustrated Old English Hexateuch (11th century), portraying Pharaoh in court session, after passing judgment on his chief baker and chief cupbearer

In the 9th and 10th centuries, the various Anglo-Saxon kingdoms were consolidated under the rule of the House of Wessex into a single Kingdom of England. Kings had extensive powers to make laws, mint coins, levy taxes, raise armies, regulate trade, and determine foreign policy. The current British coronation service largely dates back to 973. Edgar the Peaceful and subsequent monarchs swore a coronation oath to protect the English church, defend their people against enemies, and to administer justice.

The king was advised by a group of councilors or "wise men" called a witan, composed of lords and church leaders. The witan was consulted when creating law and was the highest court in the land where the king gave final judgment in person. In times of crisis or when a king was too young to rule, the witan may have assumed greater role over government.

While a capital existed at Winchester (where the royal treasury was located), the king and his itinerant court moved constantly throughout the kingdom. Priests attached to the king's chapel acted as royal secretaries—writing letters, charters, and other official documents. Under Edward the Confessor (r. 1042–1066), the office of chancellor appears for the first time. Regenbald, the first chancellor, kept the king's seal and oversaw the writing of charters and writs. The treasury had probably developed into a permanent institution by the time of King Cnut (r. 1016–1035). During the Confessor's reign, supervision of the treasury was one of the responsibilities of the king's burthegns or chamberlains.

By the tenth century, England was divided into shires and subdivided into hundreds. The hundred was the basic unit of government and overseen by a reeve. The shire was presided over by the "shire reeve" or sheriff. Sheriffs enforced royal justice, maintained the king's peace, collected royal revenue, and commanded the shire's military forces.

Besides shire courts and hundred courts, private courts also existed. In the Anglo-Saxon period, the king created private courts in two ways. First, the king could grant the church (either the bishop of a diocese or the abbot of a religious house) the right to administer a hundred. The hundred's reeve would then answer to the bishop or abbot. The same cases would be tried as before, but the profits of justice would now go to the church. The second way was to grant by writ or charter special rights to a landowner termed sake and soke. This was the right to hold a court with jurisdiction over his own lands, including infangthief (the power to punish thieves).

=== Norman government (1066–1154) ===
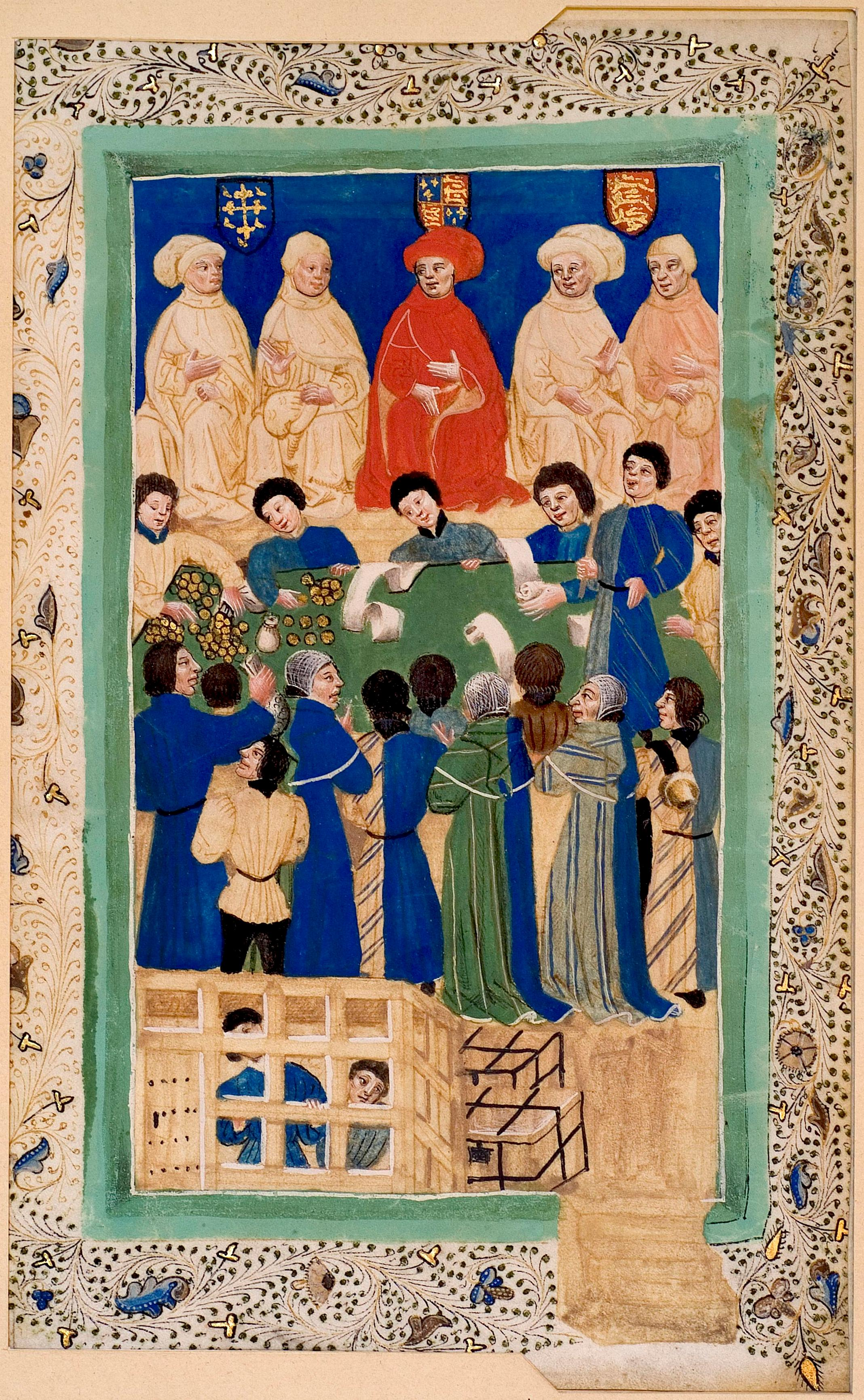
The Court of Exchequer at work

After the Norman Conquest of 1066, the king and his court or curia regis was the center of government. It was where he received counsel, heard complaints and petitions, settled important lawsuits, and conducted state trials. At certain times, the king enlarged the court by summoning large numbers of magnates (earls, barons, bishops and abbots) to attend a magnum concilium (Latin for "great council") to discuss national business and promulgate legislation. Councils were important venues for building consensus for royal policy.

As Norman kings spent most of their time in Normandy, it became necessary to appoint agents to govern England in their absence. The chief justiciar functioned as the king's chief minister and viceroy with particular responsibility over financial and legal matters. The chancellor oversaw the chancery, which was responsible for writing royal documents.

During the reign of Henry I (r. 1100–1135), the exchequer became the government's primary financial department. The treasury at London became the lower exchequer or "exchequer of receipt". It was staffed by the treasurer, two chamberlains, and other minor officials. Sheriffs paid county revenues to the lower exchequer. The upper exchequer consisted of the barons of the exchequer, who were selected from among court and household officials. The barons audited the sheriffs' accounts twice a year. When disputes arose over financial rights and obligations, the exchequer functioned as a court, the Court of the Exchequer.

Sheriffs remained in charge of royal administration in the counties (formerly shires), presiding over a hierarchy of bailiffs. Hundred and county courts, presided over by the sheriff or his bailiff, continued to meet as they had before the Conquest. Most disputes in these courts concerned land claims, violence, or theft. Certain cases called pleas of the Crown (Note: Pleas of the Crown included crimes such as murder, treason, arson, robbery, rape, and highway destruction.) could only be heard by the king or his representative. So that royal pleas could be heard across the kingdom, the chief justiciar sent itinerant royal justices out to the counties.

The laws concerned with royal forests (i.e. royal hunting preserves) were adjudicated by forest courts, and jurisdiction over cases involving marriage, wills, legitimacy, and crimes committed by clerics were transferred to church courts. The lord of a manor automatically enjoyed the right to hold a manorial court—a departure from Anglo-Saxon tradition, which required royal grant to have sake and soke.

=== Angevin government (1154–1216) ===
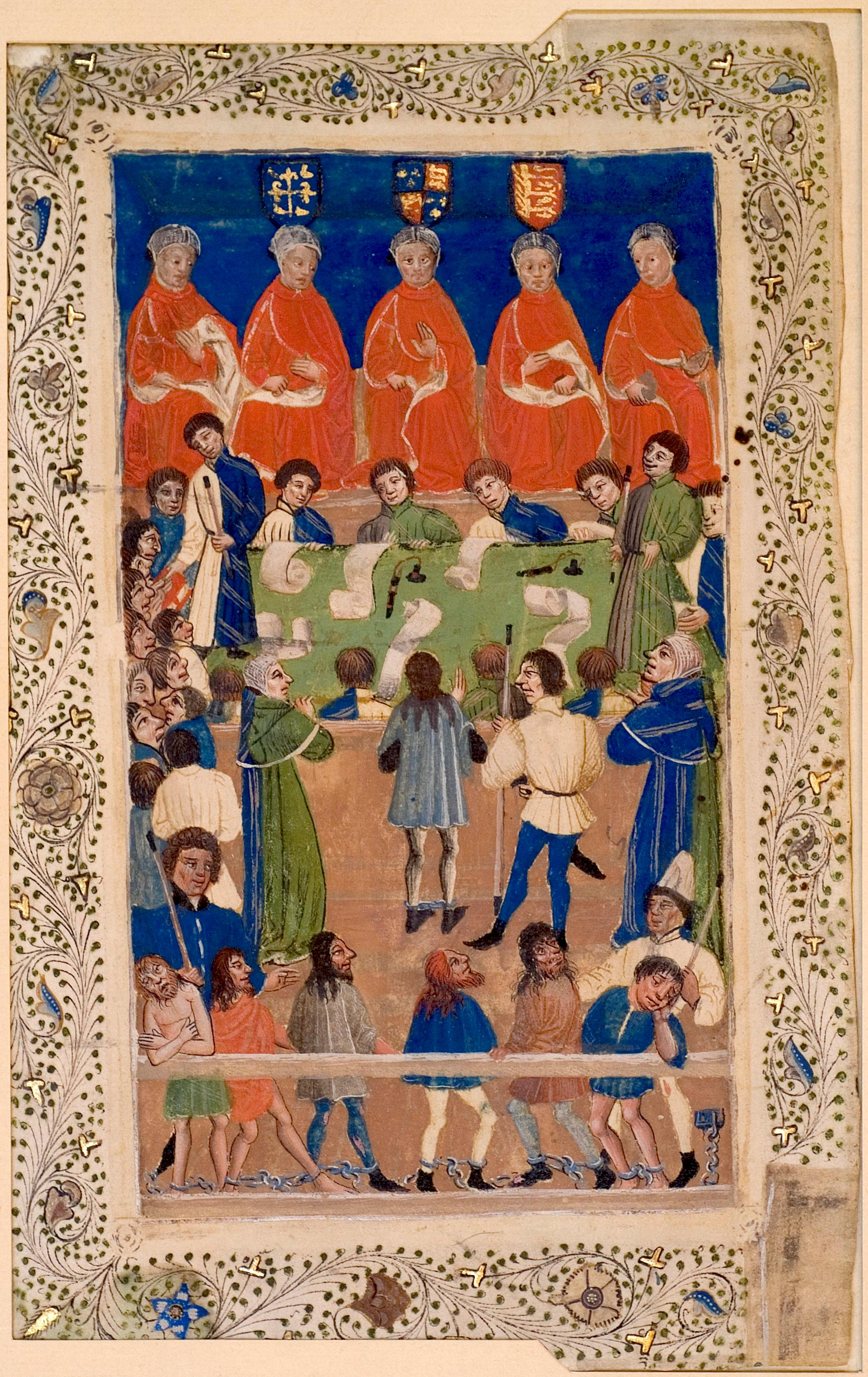
The Court of King's Bench depicted in an illuminated manuscript from about 1460.

Henry II (r. 1154–1189) introduced the assize, a new form of legislation that clarified or altered custom by agreement between the king and his feudal tenants.

The Assize of Clarendon of 1166 assigned royal justices to general eyres (circuits) to hear Crown pleas. Juries of presentment identified suspects, whose innocence or guilt was proven in a trial by ordeal. The Grand Assize of 1179 gave civil case defendants the option of having the matter settled by a jury of twelve knights instead of trial by battle. In 1215, the Fourth Lateran Council forbade clergy participation in trial by ordeal, and it was replaced in England by the jury trial.

Henry's legal reforms mark the origins of the common law and improved the availability of royal justice. Petty assizes were procedures that allowed speedy resolution of land disputes. These include novel disseisin, mort d'ancestor, and darrein presentment.

The growth of the legal system required specialization, and the judicial functions of the curia regis were delegated to two courts sitting at Westminster Hall. The Court of Common Pleas split from the Court of Exchequer in the 1190s. It had jurisdiction over ordinary civil cases (such as debts, property rights, and trespass). It was staffed by a chief justice of the Common Pleas and several other justices of the Common Pleas. The Court of King's Bench had jurisdiction over Crown pleas. The King's Bench could review decisions of the Common Pleas through writs of error. It had its own chief justice in addition to several justices of the King's Bench.

Traditionally, the great council was not involved in levying taxes, but this changed as instances of extraordinary taxation increased. (Note: Taxes were levied to finance the Third Crusade, the ransom of Richard I, and the series of Anglo-French wars fought between the Plantagenet and Capetian dynasties.) The likelihood of resistance made consent politically necessary. England was understood to be a communitas regni (Latin for 'community of the realm') and the barons as its natural representatives. But this development created conflict between kings and the baronage as the latter attempted to defend what they considered the rights belonging to the king's subjects.

==== Magna Carta ====
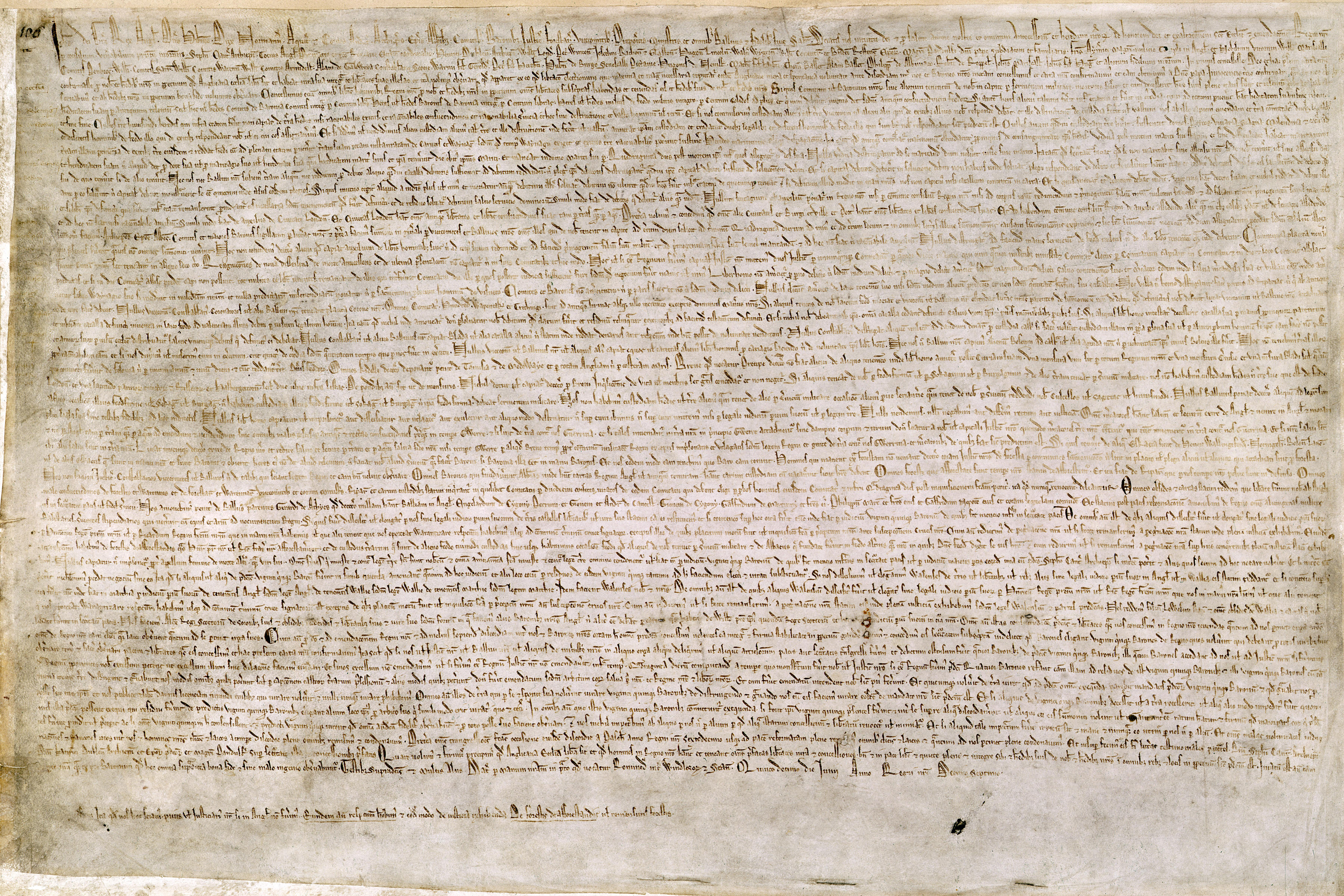
An original copy of the 1215 version of Magna Carta

King John (r. 1199–1216) needed large amounts of money to recover the lost continental possessions of the Angevin Empire, and his extortionate use of scutage, fines and amercements provoked baronial opposition. In 1215, about forty barons rose in revolt. A larger group of barons—around one hundred—worked with Stephen Langton, Archbishop of Canterbury, to mediate a compromise that ultimately became Magna Carta. This was a charter of liberties that expressed what the barons believed to be their customary feudal rights. Magna Carta was based on three assumptions important to later constitutional development:

1. the king was subject to the law
2. the king could only make law and raise taxation (except customary feudal dues) with the consent of the community of the realm
3. that the obedience owed by subjects to the king was conditional and not absolute

While the clause stipulating no taxation "without the common counsel" was deleted from later reissues, it was nevertheless adhered to by later kings. Magna Carta transformed the magnates' feudal obligation to advise the king into a right to consent. While it was the barons who made the charter, the liberties guaranteed within it were granted to "all the free men of our realm". None of the charter's provisions applied to the unfree serfs that formed a majority of the English population.

Magna Carta was a paradox, as highlighted by constitutional scholar Ann Lyon:

that although the king was subject to the law, only the king could make law, so that King John could subordinate himself to the law which he and his predecessors had made, but he could amend that law. . . . Not for many years after 1215 did a power to make laws independently of the king develop. Magna Carta marked the beginning of this development, but power to make law remained firmly in the hands of the king, so that it represents terms conceded by John, not a democratic structure which circumscribed his powers and those of his heirs.

Later kings would reconfirm Magna Carta, and later versions were enshrined in law. Overtime, Magna Carta gained the status of "fundamental statute". The first three clauses have never been repealed:

1. the English Church shall be free, and shall have its rights undiminished, and its liberties unimpaired;
2. the city of London shall enjoy all its ancient liberties and free customs … all other cities, boroughs, towns and ports shall enjoy all their liberties and free customs;
3. to no one will we sell, to no one deny or delay right or justice.

=== Parliamentary monarchy (1216–1399) ===
By 1237, the curia regis had formally split into two separate councils; though, they had long been separate in practice. The king's council was "permanent, advisory, and executive". It managed day to day government and included the king's ministers and closest advisers. Parliament was the larger assembly of magnates that evolved out of the magnum concilium or great council. It met occasionally when summoned by the king. Parliament differed from the older magnate council by being "an institution of the community rather than the crown". For the community of the realm, "it acts as representative, approaching the government from without, and 'parleying' with the king and his council".

Before 1258, legislation was not a major part of parliamentary business. The two major forms of legislation were enacted outside of Parliament. The first form, legislative acta, were administrative orders drafted by the king's council and issued as letters patent or letters close. The second form, writs, were drafted by the chancery and issued in response to particular court cases. Technically, new writs needed consent from Parliament as much as other forms of legislation, but this was not always sought.

Parliament successfully asserted for itself the right to consent to taxation, and a pattern developed in which the king would make concessions (such as reaffirming Magna Carta) in return for grants of taxation. This was its main tool in disputes with the king. Nevertheless, this proved ineffective at restraining the king as he was still able to raise lesser amounts of revenue from sources that did not require parliamentary consent:

- county farms (the fixed sum paid annually by sheriffs for the privilege of administering and profiting from royal lands in their counties)
- profits from the eyre
- tallage on the royal demesne, the towns, foreign merchants, and most importantly English Jews
- scutage
- feudal dues and fines
- profits from wardship, escheat, and vacant episcopal sees

==== Baronial reform movement ====
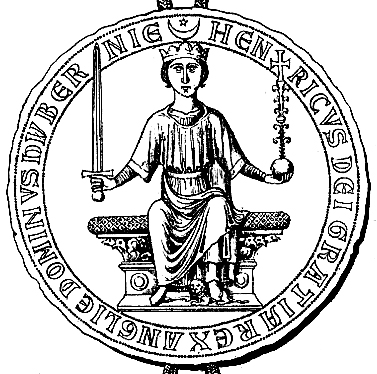
The seal of Henry III. Under the Provisions of Oxford, use of the seal was controlled by a council of barons.

The government of Henry III (r. 1216–1272) was led by a succession of chief ministers who alienated the baronage by their accumulation of power and wealth for themselves and their families. At the Oxford Parliament of 1258, reform-minded barons forced a reluctant king to accept a constitutional framework known as the Provisions of Oxford. The reformers hoped that the provisions would ensure parliamentary approval for all major government acts. Under the provisions, Parliament was "established formally (and no longer merely by custom) as the voice of the community".

The king defeated the reform party in the Second Barons' War, and the Provisions of Oxford were overturned. But the reign of Henry III was "the beginnings of the transition from the king as an absolute and in a sense dictatorial ruler, to the concept of the king ruling through institutions, and of his ruling only while he retained the trust and confidence of his people."

==== Edwardian government ====
John Ball, a leader of the Peasants' Revolt of 1381 following repression after the Black Death, preached that "matters goeth not well to pass in England, nor shall not do till everything be common, and that there be no villains nor gentlemen, but that we may be all unied [sic] together, and that the lords be no greater masters than we be."

The reign of Edward I (r. 1272–1307) saw the continued development of Parliament as an institution. Edward summoned parliaments regularly, generally twice a year at Easter in the spring and after Michaelmas in the autumn. As feudalism declined, the political community expanded. The shires and boroughs were recognised as communes (Latin communitas) with a unified constituency capable of being represented by knights of the shire and burgesses in Parliament.

In this period, law-making was still largely the prerogative of the monarch, and there was no difference between laws made in Parliament and laws made by the monarch alone. Outside of Parliament, the king could issue ordinances and writs that had the force of law. Furthermore, laws made in Parliament "were not made by the King in Parliament, but simply announced by the king or his ministers in a parliament."

The first major statutes amending the common law were passed, beginning with the Statute of Westminster in 1275. Edward's legal reforms established the foundation of English land law, which was not significantly altered until 1925. For example, the Statute of Westminster of 1285 allowed for the creation of entails. Royal control over non-royal courts was also increased; the writ of Circumspecte Agatis limited the jurisdiction of ecclesiastical courts to attacks on clerics and matrimonial, testamentary, and moral concerns.

Edward invaded Wales in 1276 and completed the conquest of Wales in 1283. The King himself took over the west and north of the country. The rest of Wales was divided between marcher lords. The Statute of Wales created a system of shires for northern Wales that were overseen by the Justiciar of North Wales. English criminal law was imposed, but Welsh law continued to apply in other areas of life. In 1301, the king gave his eldest son the title Prince of Wales with control of royal lands and rights in Wales (see Principality of Wales).

The Ordinances of 1311 were a series of regulations imposed on King Edward II by the Lords and higher clergy to restrict the power of the king.

Throughout the middle ages, common land was a source of welfare for common people, peasant labourers bound by a feudal system of control. In 1348, the Black Death struck England, and killed around a third of the population. As peasants lost their lords, and there was a shortage of workers, wages rose. The King and Parliament responded with the Statute of Labourers 1351 to freeze wage rises. This led to the Peasants’ Revolt of 1381, where leaders demanded an end to feudalism, and for everything to be held in common. Despite the revolt’s violent repression, slavery and serfdom broke down, yet most people remained without any substantial liberty, in political or economic rights.

As sheep farming became more profitable than agricultural work, enclosures of common land dispossessed more people, who turned into paupers and were punished.

=== Tudor dynasty ===
Under Henry VIII, to seal a divorce from Catherine of Aragon and marry Anne Boleyn (who he soon beheaded for supposed infidelity), the Church of England was declared separate from Rome in the Act of Supremacy 1534, with the King as the head. The Law in Wales Act 1535 united Wales and England in one administrative system, while the King became ever more despotic, executing the Lord Chancellor, Sir Thomas More in 1535, and dissolving the monasteries and murdering those who resisted. After Henry VIII died, and power struggles following the death of his boy Edward VI at age 15, Elizabeth I, the daughter of Henry VIII and Anne Boleyn, took the throne in 1558. Half a century of prosperity followed as Elizabeth I largely avoided wars.

A second Act of Supremacy 1559 restored powers over the church to Elizabeth I, reversing Mary I's catholic laws, and required all office-holders including the clergy to take an oath of allegiance acknowledging the Queen as the supreme governor of the Church of England. After the Spanish Armada was defeated in 1588, Parliament felt safer and thus it decreased its loyalty to the monarchy. Its two levels of administration were the House of Lords, composed of influential peers of the realm and Lords Spiritual, and the House of Commons, which consisted of representative members of the aristocracy and the middle-class. The House of Commons doubled in size due to the prosperity of the middle-class during that time. Puritans in the House of Commons began demanding more rights, but their demands were ignored. James I would later have problems with them.

Before 1600, the Crown founded corporations including the East India Company to monopolise trade routes. Under her successor, James I, further companies were created to colonise North America, including the London Company and the Virginia Company in 1606, and the Massachusetts Bay Company in 1628. Many religious dissidents left England to settle the new world.

=== Stuart dynasty ===
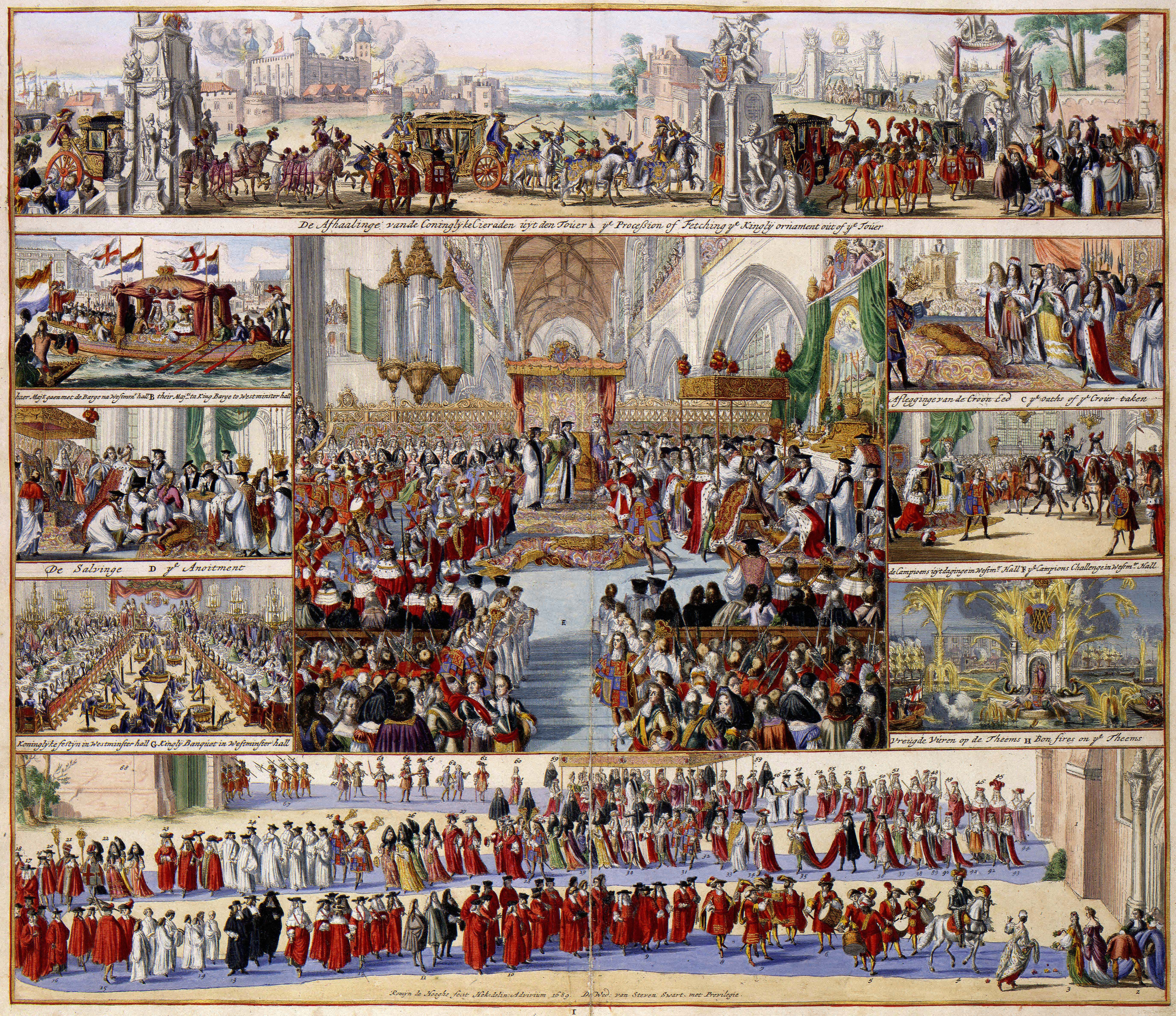
The Glorious Revolution of 1688 confirmed Parliament's supremacy over the monarch, represented by John Locke's Second Treatise on Government (1689). This laid the foundations for a peaceful unification of England and Scotland in the Act of Union 1707.

While Elizabeth I maintained a protestant Church, under her successor James, who unified the Scottish and English Crowns, religious and political tensions grew as he asserted a divine right of Kings. In 1605, Guy Fawkes attempted to blow up Parliament, but was caught, tortured and executed. A wave of repression against catholics followed. James acceded to Puritan requests by commissioning the "King James Bible" in 1604, an English language translation and interpretation of the Bible completed in 1611. Possibly persuaded by his (secretly Catholic) wife, James exempted Catholics from paying tithes to the Anglican Church, but this caused a great decrease in Anglican Church revenue, so he quickly took those rights away.

The assertion of divine right prompted a series of cases from Sir Edward Coke, the Chief Justice of the Common Pleas and then King's Bench courts, which denied that the King could pass judgment in legal proceedings, and held that the royal prerogative was subject to the law and cannot be expanded. Coke CJ went even further in Dr Bonham's case, holding that even that "the common law will control Acts of Parliament". Though supported by some judges, the idea that common law courts could nullify Acts of Parliament was rejected, and the common law was formally placed under the King's control in the Earl of Oxford’s case, establishing that equity (then administered by the Lord Chancellor in the House of Lords) was above common law. Coke fell from favour, and was removed from judicial office.

Traditionally, Parliament had voted at the beginning of a King's reign on the amount allowed for a King's Tonnage and Poundage, the customs duties (taxes on imported goods like wool and wine) that made up a large portion of a king's annual income. Now Parliament wanted to re-evaluate these taxes annually, which would give it more control over the king. James I resisted this abrogation of his 'Divine Right' and dealt with the situation by dissolving Parliament. Charles I did the same at first and later just ignored its annual evaluations.

When Charles I succeeded to the throne in 1625, and more fervently asserted a divine right, including the ability to levy tax without Parliament, particularly a Ship Money tax that required the counties bordering the sea to fund a navy to protect the English coastline. The coastal counties were unhappy as it was not actually used to fund the navy. Charles then placed the Ship Money tax on the interior counties as well. A London MP named John Hampden refused to pay this "new," interior Ship Money tax, so he was tried for a crime by Charles I and was convicted with a vote of 7 to 5. This meant that 5 of 12 jurors were against their king, which did not look good or bode well for Charles I. Coke and others presented the Petition of Right 1628. This demanded the King to abide by Magna Carta, levy no tax without Parliament, not arbitrarily commit people to prison, not have martial law in times of peace, and not billet soldiers in private homes. As Charles I was at war with France and Spain, he signed the Petition of Right, but then responded by shutting down or proroguing Parliament and taxing trade (or "ship money") without authority.

The country descended into the English Civil War in 1642 culminating in the capture and execution of King Charles I on Whitehall in 1649 by the New Model Army led by Oliver Cromwell. Cromwell, not wishing to become a King, became a de facto dictator. After his death, the monarchy was restored with Charles II in 1660, but his successor James II again attempted to assert divine right to rule. In 1688, Parliament 'invited' a replacement King and Queen, William and Mary of Orange, and after a brief conflict forced James II out.

Known as the Glorious Revolution, Parliament proclaimed a new Bill of Rights 1689, with a Claim of Right Act 1689 in Scotland, that cemented Parliamentary sovereignty. As well as reaffirming Magna Carta, it says the 'pretended power of suspending laws or the execution of laws by regal authority without consent of Parliament is illegal’, that 'election of members of Parliament ought to be free’, and that 'Parliament ought to be held frequently'. The justification for government itself, encapsulated by John Locke in his Second Treatise on Government was the protection of people's rights: "lives, liberties and estates."

==== Civil War ====
William Laud and Thomas Wentworth were appointed to fill the void that the Duke of Buckingham left. On top of the wars England had with France and with Spain (both caused by the Duke of Buckingham), Charles I and William Laud (the Archbishop of Canterbury) began a war with Scotland in an attempt to convert Scotland to the Church of England (the Anglican Church). This was called the Bishops' War (1639–1640) and it had two major parts: The first Bishops' War (1639) ended in a truce. The second Bishops' War, the following year, began with the a Scottish invasion of England in which the Scottish defeated the English and remained stationed in England until their issues were solved. To get the Scottish out, Charles I signed the Treaty of Ripon (1640), which required England to pay an indemnity of £850 for each day that the Scottish were stationed in England.

During the second part of the Bishops' War, Charles I had run very low on money (since he was also fighting France and Spain), so he was forced to call a Parliament to make new taxes. He and the Parliament could not agree on anything, so after three weeks, Charles I dissolved the Parliament. Then he desperately needed new taxes, so Charles I called a Parliament again and it would only help him if he agreed to some terms, which ultimately made Charles I a constitutional monarch. It was called the Long Parliament (1640–1660), because it was not officially dissolved by its own vote until 1660.

These terms were:

- That Charles I had to impeach Thomas Wentworth and William Laud. He reluctantly placed them under arrest and put them in The Tower, executing Wentworth in 1641 (for which Charles I never forgave himself since he was close to Thomas Wentworth) and William Laud in 1645.
- Charles I had to agree to the Triennial Act 1640 (1641), which required the Parliament to meet every three years with or without the king's consent.
- Charles I had to abolish the Court of the Star Chamber, a royal court controlled completely by Charles I in which the prosecutor was also the judge (which pretty much guaranteed a guilty verdict for the defendant) and it was intended to be used to implement the will of the king legally with a "judicial" façade. It was considered an "extralegal" court. It dealt with odd cases and punishments.
- Charles I had to abolish the High Court, which was the same as the Court of the Star Chamber, though it dealt with religious heresy. It was considered an "extralegal" court.
- Charles I had to accept the Grand Remonstrance and allow the circulation of its copies, and it was a document that outlined (hyperbolically) the crimes that officials had accused Charles of committing since the beginning of his reign. Charles I was also never to do any of those crimes again.
- Charles I, most importantly, had to agree never to dissolve a Parliament without the consent of the Parliament.

Most of England believed that Parliament had done enough to curb the power of King Charles I, but the radicals in Parliament (the extremist Puritans) and the radicals around the country (again, extremist Puritans) wanted to reform the Church of England by getting rid of the bishops (and all other things with the semblance of Catholicism) and by establishing the Puritans' method of worship as the standard. This caused a political division in Parliament, so Charles I took advantage of it. He then sent 500 soldiers into the House of Commons to arrest five of the Puritans' ringleaders (John Hampden included). The five ringleaders had been tipped off, so they had left Parliament and Charles I was left with only shame for storming Parliament.

King Charles I left London and went to Oxford, and the English Civil War began (1642). The North and West of England were on Charles I's side (along with most of the Nobles and country gentry). They were known as the Cavaliers. Charles I created an army illegally (since he needed the Parliament's consent).

The South and East of England were on Parliament's side and were known as Roundheads, for their haircuts. In response to Charles I raising an army, they did so as well. Yet, they didn't have the military might that King Charles I (and his nobles) had, so they solicited the help of the Scottish with the Solemn League and Covenant that promised to impose the Presbyterian religion on the Church of England. They called their army the New Model Army and they made its commander Oliver Cromwell, who was also a member of Parliament. The New Model Army was composed mostly of Presbyterians.

==== Cromwell and Commonwealth ====
Though Parliament won, it was clear to the Scots that it was not going to uphold the Solemn League and Covenant by imposing Presbyterianism on England (Puritanism wasn't quite Presbyterian), so the New Model Army, Parliament and the Scots began falling apart. The Scots were paid for their help and sent back to Scotland.

The Presbyterian Roundheads were interested in freedom to practice their religion and not in making the Presbyterian religion the state religion.

Cromwell proposed that Parliament reinstate the bishops of the Church of England and King Charles I as a constitutional monarch, but allow for the toleration of other religions. Though at the end of the war, the people of England could accept Charles I back in office but not religious toleration. They also wanted the New Model Army dissolved since it was a provocative factor. Thus Parliament disallowed religious toleration and voted to disband the New Model Army, but the New Model Army refused the order.

Charles I then made the same deal that the Roundheads had made with the Scottish and Parliamentary Presbyterians. He solicited the help of Scotland (and the Presbyterians) and in return he promised to impose Presbyterianism on England. The New Model Army would not allow this deal to be made (because it would give Charles I military power once more). Thus a "new" civil war broke out in 1648.

This time, Scotland, the Parliamentary Presbyterians and the royalists were on the side of Charles I. The New Model Army and the rest of Parliament were against him.

In the Battle of Preston (1648) Cromwell and his New Model Army defeated Charles I.

Then one of Cromwell's officers, Colonel Pride, destroyed the Presbyterian majority in Parliament by driving out of Parliament 143 Presbyterians of the 203 (leaving behind 60). The new Parliament constituted a Rump Parliament, which was a Parliament in which the minority (Presbyterians) carried on in the name of the majority that was kicked out. The Rump Parliament:

- Abolished the monarchy and the House of Lords in Parliament (it then executed Charles I after publicly trying him for crimes).
- Created a republic called the "Commonwealth" that was really just a dictatorship run by Cromwell.

Scotland was against Cromwell's "Commonwealth" (Republic) and declared Charles I's son king at Edinburgh as King Charles II, but Cromwell and the New Model Army defeated him (1650) and he fled to France where he stayed until 1660.

Cromwell then went to Ireland to govern it, but was "disgusted" with the Catholics, so he massacred many of them (in battle) and so the Irish rebelled against him as well. Cromwell then dissolved the Rump Parliament and declared himself to be the Lord Protector (dictator).

Cromwell died (1658) and was succeeded by his son Richard Cromwell, who tried to keep power militarily and absolutely, but he was also incapable of unifying all of the diverse groups (religious and ethnic). General George Monk came down from Scotland and overthrew Richard. He then invited the remnants of the Long Parliament (the Rump Parliament) to reconvene. The Long Parliament met and officially ended (in 1660, after being open since 1640) when it voted to dissolve itself and create a new Parliament. The new Parliament began the Restoration (of the monarchy) by choosing Charles I's son Charles II to be the King of England.

==== Popular political movements ====
The idea of a political party with factions took form around the time of the Civil War. Soldiers from the Parliamentarian New Model Army and a faction of Levellers freely debated rights to political representation during the Putney Debates of 1647. The Levellers published a newspaper (The Moderate) and pioneered political petitions, pamphleteering and party colours. Later, the pre-war Royalist (then Cavalier) and opposing Parliamentarian groupings became the Tory party and the Whigs in the Parliament.

In 1649 Diggers, a small people's political reform movement, published The True Levellers Standard Advanced: or, The State of Community opened, and Presented to the Sons of Men. The Diggers are sometimes called "True Levellers" to distinguish themselves from the larger political group called the Levellers, which had supported the republicans during the civil war. The Diggers were not satisfied with what had been gained by the war against the king and wanted instead a dismantling of the state. They can be best understood through such philosophies as libertarianism, anarchism, and religious communism.

Also at this time, the Polish Brethren arrived in England and Holland. The sect of Polish Brethren had been driven out of Poland after The Deluge because they were commonly considered to be collaborators with the Swedish.

The Diggers' radical ideas influenced thinkers in Poland, Holland, and England, playing an especially important role in the philosophy of John Locke. Locke, in turn, profoundly impacted the development of political ideas regarding liberty, which would later influence the Founding Fathers of the United States.

The Glorious Revolution was the overthrow of James II in 1688 and his replacement with William III and Mary II as joint monarchs. The Convention Parliament of 1689 drew up a Declaration of Right to address perceived abuses of government under James II and to secure the religion and liberties of Protestants. This was enacted by the Parliament of England as the Bill of Rights 1689, which limited royal power and reaffirmed certain civil rights, building on the Petition of Right 1628 and the Habeas Corpus Act 1679. The Parliament of Scotland approved it as the Claim of Right.

Both the Bill of Rights and the Claim of Right contributed a great deal to the establishment of the concept of parliamentary sovereignty and the curtailment of the powers of the monarch. Leading, ultimately, to the establishment of constitutional monarchy. They furthered the protection of the rule of law, which had started to become a principle of the way the country is governed.

=== Wales ===
Under the Statute of Wales, English criminal law replaced Welsh law in 1284. English civil law was imposed on Wales by Henry VIII's series of Laws in Wales Acts between 1535 and 1542. The Laws in Wales Acts formally incorporated all of Wales within the Kingdom of England.

The Encyclopaedia of Wales notes that the Council of Wales and the Marches was created by Edward IV in 1471 as a household institution to manage the Prince of Wales's lands and finances. In 1473, it was enlarged and given the additional duty of maintaining law and order in the Principality and the Marches of Wales. Its meetings appear to have been intermittent, but it was revived by Henry VII for his heir, Prince Arthur. The Council was placed on a statutory basis in 1543 and played a central role in co-ordinating law and administration. It declined in the early 17th century and was abolished by Parliament in 1641. It was revived at the Restoration before being finally abolished in 1689.

From 1689 to 1948 there was no differentiation between the government of England and government in Wales. All laws relating to England included Wales and Wales was considered by the British Government as an indivisible part of England within the United Kingdom. The first piece of legislation to relate specifically to Wales was the Sunday Closing (Wales) Act 1881. A further exception was the Welsh Church Act 1914, which disestablished the Church in Wales (which had formerly been part of the Church of England) in 1920.

In 1948 the practice was established that all laws passed in the Parliament of the United Kingdom were designated as applicable to either "England and Wales" or "Scotland", thus returning a legal identity to Wales which had not existed for hundreds of years following the Act of Union with Scotland in 1707. Also in 1948 a new Council for Wales was established as a parliamentary committee. In 1964 the Welsh Office was established, based in London, to oversee and recommend improvements to the application of laws in Wales. This situation would continue until the devolution of government in Wales and the establishment of the autonomous National Assembly for Wales in 1998.

== Kingdom of Scotland ==
From the fifth century AD, north Britain was divided into a series of petty kingdoms. Ferocious Viking raids beginning in AD 793 may have speeded up a long-term process of gaelicisation of the Pictish kingdoms, which adopted Gaelic language and customs. There was also a merger of the Gaelic and Pictish kingdoms. This culminated in the rise of Cínaed mac Ailpín (Kenneth MacAlpin) as "king of the Picts" in the 840s (traditionally dated to 843), which brought to power the House of Alpin. When he died as king of the combined kingdom in 900 one of his successors, Domnall II (Donald II), was the first man to be called rí Alban (King of Alba).

The term Scotia was increasingly used to describe the heartland of these kings, north of the River Forth. Eventually the entire area controlled by its kings was referred to as Scotland. The long reign (900–942/3) of Donald's successor Causantín (Constantine II) is often regarded as the key to formation of the Kingdom of Alba/Scotland. He was later credited with bringing Scottish Christianity into conformity with the Catholic Church.

Máel Coluim I (Malcolm I) (reigned c. 943–954) annexed Strathclyde, over which the kings of Alba had probably exercised some authority since the later ninth century. The reign of David I has been characterised as a "Davidian Revolution", in which he introduced a system of feudal land tenure, established the first royal burghs in Scotland and the first recorded Scottish coinage, and continued a process of religious and legal reforms.

=== Government ===
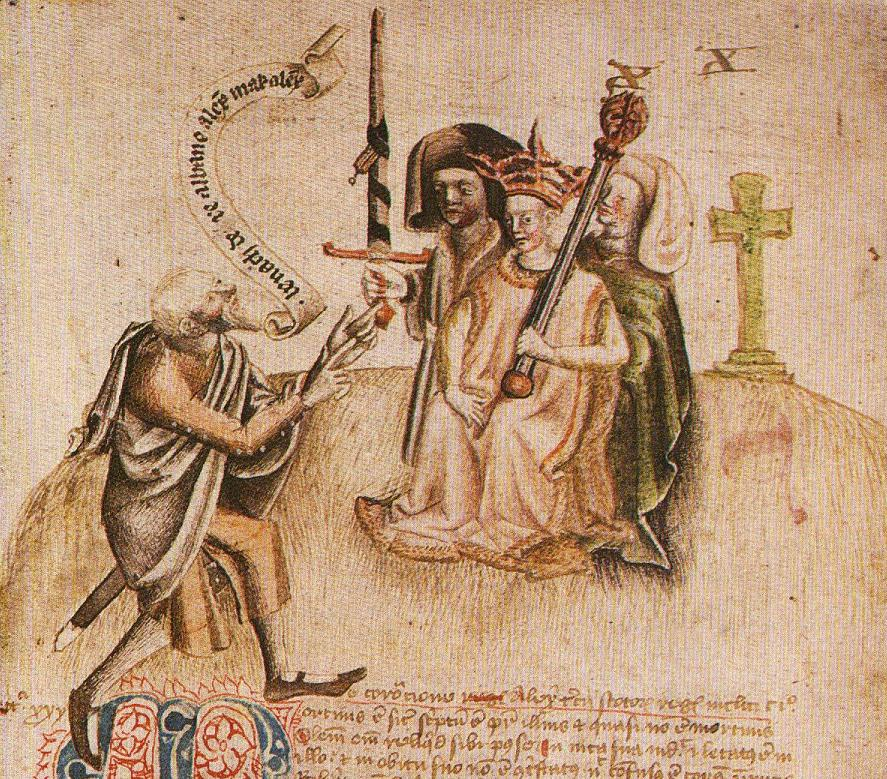
The coronation of Alexander III of Scotland at Scone Abbey;. Beside him are the Mormaers of Strathearn and Fife while his genealogy is recited by a royal poet.

The unified kingdom of Alba retained some of the ritual aspects of Pictish and Scottish kingship. These can be seen in the elaborate ritual coronation at the Stone of Scone at Scone Abbey.

While the Scottish monarchy in the Middle Ages was a largely itinerant institution, Scone remained one of its most important locations, with royal castles at Stirling and Perth becoming significant in the later Middle Ages before Edinburgh developed as a capital city in the second half of the fifteenth century.

The Crown remained the most important element of government, despite the many royal minorities. In the late Middle Ages, it saw much of the aggrandisement associated with the New Monarchs elsewhere in Europe. Theories of constitutional monarchy and resistance were articulated by Scots, particularly George Buchanan, in the sixteenth century, but James VI of Scotland advanced the theory of the divine right of kings, and these debates were restated in subsequent reigns and crises. The court remained at the centre of political life, and in the sixteenth century emerged as a major centre of display and artistic patronage, until it was effectively dissolved with the Union of the Crowns in 1603.

The Scottish Crown adopted the conventional offices of western European courts, including High Steward, Chamberlain, Lord High Constable, Earl Marischal and Lord Chancellor. The King's Council emerged as a full-time body in the fifteenth century, increasingly dominated by laymen and critical to the administration of justice. The Privy Council, which developed in the mid-sixteenth century, and the great offices of state, including the chancellor, secretary and treasurer, remained central to the administration of the government, even after the departure of the Stuart monarchs to rule in England from 1603. However, it was often sidelined and was abolished after the Acts of Union 1707, with rule direct from London.

The Parliament of Scotland also emerged as a major legal institution, gaining an oversight of taxation and policy. By the end of the Middle Ages it was sitting almost every year, partly because of the frequent royal minorities and regencies of the period, which may have prevented it from being sidelined by the monarchy. In the early modern era, Parliament was also vital to the running of the country, providing laws and taxation, but it had fluctuating fortunes and was never as central to the national life as its counterpart in England.

In the early period the kings of the Scots depended on the great lords of the mormaers (later earls) and toísechs (later thanes), but from the reign of David I, sheriffdoms were introduced, which allowed more direct control and gradually limited the power of the major lordships. In the seventeenth century the creation of justices of the peace and the Commissioner of Supply helped to increase the effectiveness of local government. The continued existence of courts baron and introduction of kirk sessions helped consolidate the power of local lairds.

== United Kingdom development ==
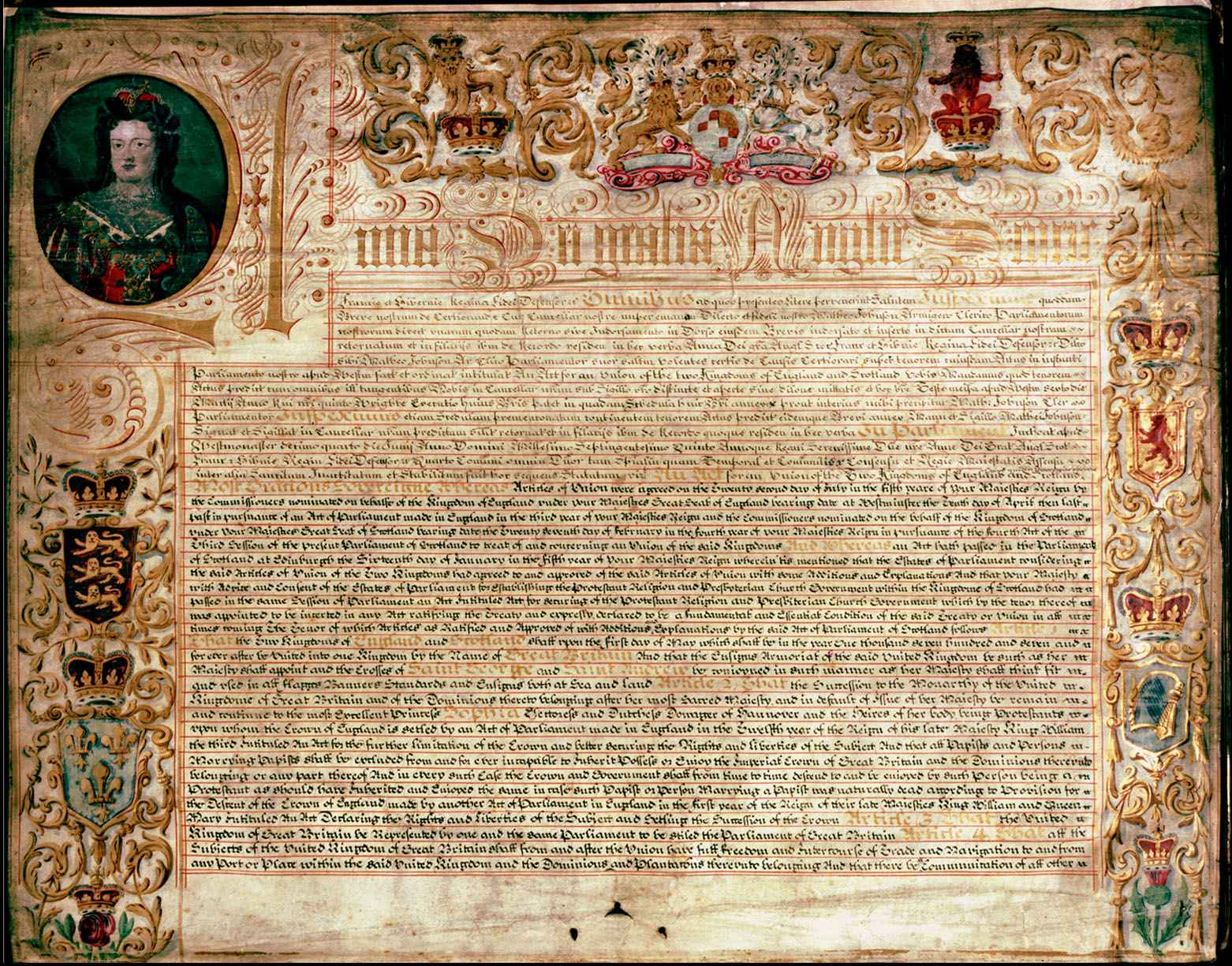
The Treaty of Union.

With Parliamentary sovereignty as the cornerstone of the new constitution, Parliament created a system of finance in the Bank of England Act 1694.

The Act of Settlement 1701 made several important reforms.

- Judges' commissions were for life (during "good behavior"), and a judge could be removed only by vote of both Houses of Parliament. (Previously, a judge served at the discretion of the Crown.)
- No person holding a paid office under the Crown or receiving a pension from the Crown could serve in the House of Commons.
- No Catholic, or spouse of a Catholic, could ever succeed to the Crown of England.
- The King or Queen of England must practice the Anglican religion.
- The succession to the Crown of England was settled on the nearest Protestant relatives of King William III and his expected successor Anne, who were childless. These were Electress Sophia of Hanover, and her son, who in 1714 succeeded as King George I.

In 1703, Ashby v White established that the right to vote was a constitutional right.

In April 1706, Scottish and English representatives began negotiations for union at Whitehall. The English proposed a combined parliament, to which Scotland would send 38 MPs and 16 peers, elected by Scottish peers at every new parliament. After the Scottish successfully negotiated an extra seven MPs, the proposals were brought before Queen Anne. The vote passed the Scottish Parliament 110 votes to 69 on 16 January 1707. The Acts of Union 1707 were passed by the English and Scottish Parliaments separately and on 1 May 1707, the two countries became formally united as Great Britain. This created a new parliament called the Parliament of Great Britain.

The Acts of Union also established a full economic union between England and Scotland. Scotland's separate currency, taxes, and trade regulations were effectively abolished, while Scottish merchants gained complete access to England and its colonies. Scotland retain a separate legal system and judiciary.

The new union was soon faced with disaster as in the War of the Spanish Succession, the Spanish promised the right for British ships to trade (mostly slaves) in the seas around South America. The South Sea Company, duly incorporated to monopolise trade routes, became the object of mass financial speculation, provoked by government ministers interested in its rising share price. When it transpired, contrary to promoters' stories, that no trade was done because the Spanish had revoked their promise the stock market crashed, driving economic chaos. This was made worse by the decision of conservative politicians to endorse the company to take over the national debt as an alternative financier to the government over the Whig dominated Bank of England.

The result of the crash was that the Chancellor of the Exchequer was imprisoned in the Tower of London for his corruption, the Postmaster General committed suicide, and the disgraced Lord Chancellor was replaced with Lord King LC who promptly ruled that people in a position of trust must avoid any possibility of a conflict of interest. Out of the chaos, Robert Walpole emerged as a stable political figure who for 21 years held a majority of the House of Commons, and is now considered the first "Prime Minister". Walpole chaired cabinet meetings, appointed all other ministers, and developed the doctrine of cabinet solidarity.

In 1765, the first teacher of English law, William Blackstone represented the standard view in his Commentaries on the Laws of England that slavery was unlawful and that "the spirit of liberty is so deeply ingrained in our constitution" any person enslaved in England must be freed. However, the transatlantic slave trade had accelerated to North American colonies. In 1772, when Lord Mansfield ruled in Somerset v Stewart that slavery was unlawful at common law, this set off a wave of outrage in southern, plantation colonies of America. Together with northern colonies grievances over taxation without representation, this led to the American Revolution and Declaration of Independence in 1776. The British military failed to hold control. Instead, it began settling Australia from 1788.

In 1789, the French Revolution broke out, and the King was deposed with demands for "liberty, equality and fraternity". The British aristocracy reacted with repression on free speech and association to forestall any similar movement. While figures like Jeremy Bentham called natural rights "nonsense upon stilts", Mary Wollstonecraft called for A Vindication of the Rights of Woman as well as men, arguing that unjust gender and class oppression flowed from "the respect paid to property... as from a poisoned fountain". While successful in the Napoleonic Wars in defeating France, and cementing union with Ireland in the Acts of Union 1800, liberty, freedom and democracy were scarcely protected in the new "United Kingdom".

== Political and industrial revolution ==
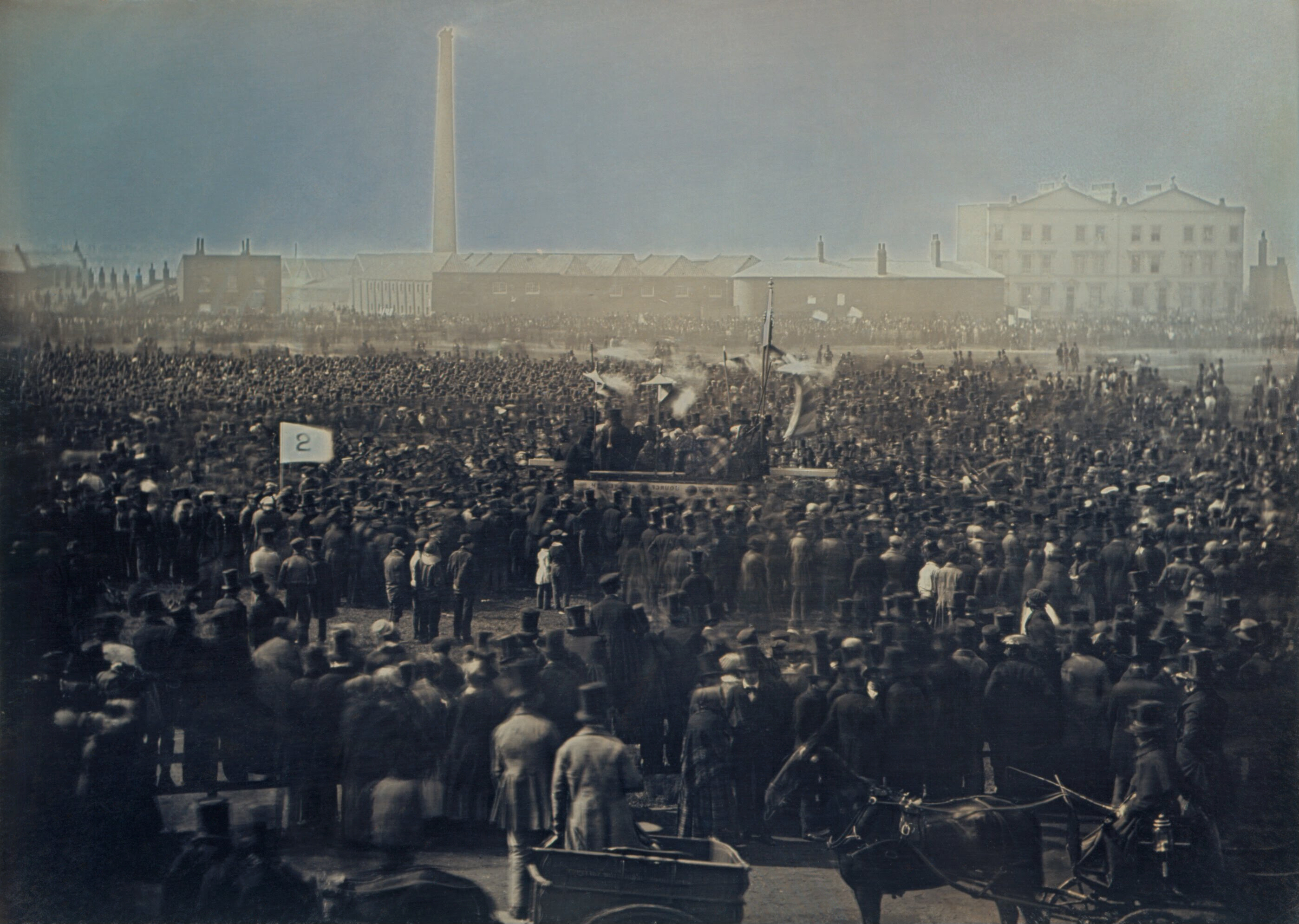
To demand democratic reform, the Chartists met on Kennington Common during the Revolutions of 1848.

During this time, with the invention of the steam engine the Industrial Revolution had begun. Poverty had also accelerated through the Speenhamland system of poor laws by subsidising employers and landowners with parish rates. The Corn Laws from 1815 further impoverished people by fixing prices to maintain landowner profits. While the Great Reform Act 1832 extended the vote slightly, only those with property had any representation in Parliament. Although the Slavery Abolition Act 1833 abolished the slave trade within the British Empire, it only compensated slave owners and made ex-slaves in colonies pay off debts for their freedom for decades after. With the Poor Law Amendment Act 1834, further punishment for poverty was inflicted as people were put into work houses if found to be unemployed. In R v Lovelass a group of agricultural workers who formed a trade union were prosecuted and sentenced to be transported to Australia under the Unlawful Oaths Act 1797, triggering mass protests.

A movement called Chartism grew demanding the right to vote for everyone in free and fair elections. As the great famine hit Ireland and millions migrated to the United States, Chartists staged a mass march from Kennington Common to Parliament in 1848 as revolutions broke out across Europe, and the Communist Manifesto was drafted by German revolutionary Karl Marx and Manchester factory owner Friedrich Engels. While the Crimean War distracted from social reform and Viscount Palmerston opposed anything, the American Civil War of 1861 to 1865 ended slavery in the US, and the UK gradually enabled greater political freedom.

In the Second Reform Act 1867 more middle class property owners were enfranchised, the Elementary Education Act 1870 provided free primary school, and the Trade Union Act 1871 enabled free association without criminal penalty. William Ewart Gladstone's UK Midlothian campaign between 1878-80 began the move towards modern political campaigning. The Representation of the People Act 1884 reduced the property qualification further, so that around one third of men could vote.

Outside the UK liberty and the right to vote were violently repressed across the vast British Empire, in Africa, India, Asia and the Caribbean.

== Social reform and war ==
From the start of the 20th century, the UK underwent vast social and constitutional change, beginning with an attempt by the House of Lords to suppress trade union freedom. In response, the labour movement organised to support representatives in Parliament, and in the 1906 general election won 29 seats and supported the Liberal Party's programme of reform. This included a legal guarantee of the right of unions to collectively bargain and strike for fair wages, an old age pension, a system of minimum wages, a People's Budget with higher taxes on the wealthy to fund spending. After a further election brought on by the House of Lords blocking reform, Parliament passed a National Insurance system for welfare, and the Parliament Act 1911 prevented the House of Lords from blocking legislation for more than two years, and removed the right to delay any money bills, such as the budget.

Despite this, the Liberal government, against the opposition of Labour, armed for and entered World War I. At the end of the War, with millions dead, Parliament passed the Representation of the People Act 1918 which granted every adult male the vote, although it was only after the mass protest of the Suffragettes that the Representation of the People (Equal Franchise) Act 1928 granted all women the vote. The War also triggered an uprising in Ireland, and the Irish War of Independence leading to the partition of the island between the Republic of Ireland in the south and Northern Ireland in the Government of Ireland Act 1920.

=== Irish independence and partition ===
In 1912, the House of Lords managed to delay a Home Rule bill passed by the House of Commons. It was enacted as the Government of Ireland Act 1914. During these two years the threat of religious civil war hung over Ireland with the creation of the Unionist Ulster Volunteers opposed to the Act and their nationalist counterparts, the Irish Volunteers supporting the Act. The outbreak of World War I in 1914 put the crisis on political hold. A disorganized Easter Rising in 1916 was brutally suppressed by the British, which had the effect of galvanizing Catholic demands for independence. Prime Minister David Lloyd George failed to introduce Home Rule in 1918 and in the December 1918 General Election Sinn Féin won a majority of Irish seats.

Sinn Féin MPs refused to take their seats at Westminster, instead choosing to sit in the First Dáil parliament in Dublin. A declaration of independence was ratified by Dáil Éireann, the self-declared Republic's parliament in January 1919. An Anglo-Irish War was fought between British forces and the Irish Republican Army between January 1919 and June 1921. The war ended with the Anglo-Irish Treaty of December 1921 that established the Irish Free State. Six northern, predominantly Protestant counties became Northern Ireland and have remained part of the United Kingdom ever since, despite demands of the Catholic minority to unite with the Republic of Ireland. Britain officially adopted the name "United Kingdom of Great Britain and Northern Ireland" by the Royal and Parliamentary Titles Act 1927.

== Post-war ==
The British Empire ended after World War II as former colonies demanded independence. The Commonwealth is now open to any country committed to peace, liberty, equality, and development, as in the Harare Declaration of 1991.

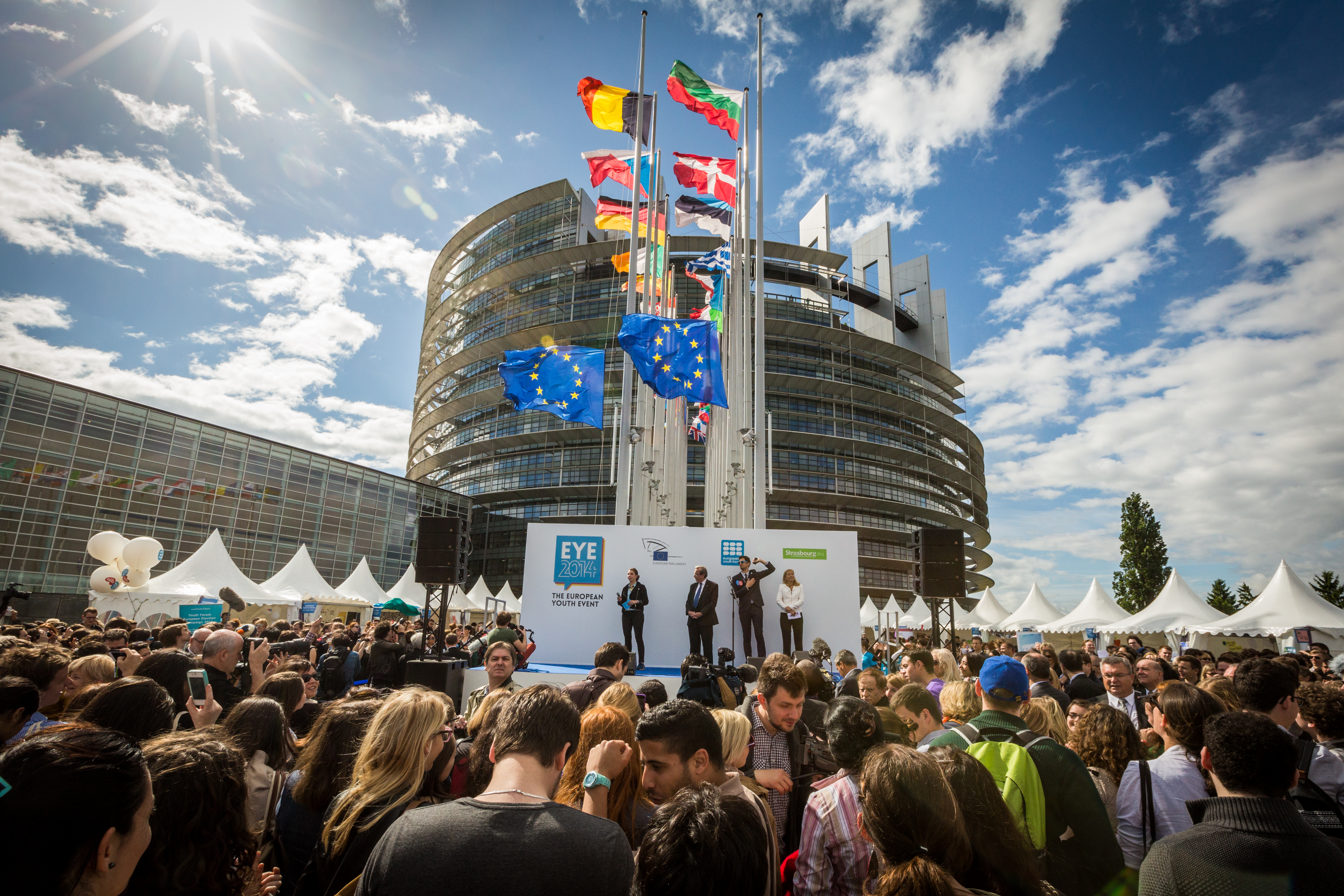
With the European Communities Act 1972, the UK became a member of the European Union, with representation in the European Parliament. This is "not merely an economic union" but is intended to "ensure social progress and seek the constant improvement of the living and working conditions of their peoples".

The failed international law system after World War II was replaced with the United Nations, where the UK held a permanent seat on the UN Security Council. However, the British Empire began to crumble as India, Israel and nations across Africa fought for democracy, human rights, and independence. To prevent any recurrence of The Holocaust and war, the Council of Europe was established to draft the European Convention on Human Rights in 1950. Further, it was seen that the only way to prevent conflict was through economic integration. The European Economic Community, which became the European Union in 1992, was supported by Winston Churchill with the UK to be "at the centre", although it did not enter until the European Communities Act 1972.

Under Margaret Thatcher, significant cuts were made to public services, labour rights, and the powers of local government, including abolishing the Greater London Council. However some powers were restored with extensive devolution of power in the Scotland Act 1998, Northern Ireland Act 1998, Greater London Authority Act 1999 and the Government of Wales Act 2006. After many years of armed conflict in Northern Ireland, the Good Friday Agreement of 1998 brought peace.

The Life Peerages Act 1958 had allowed the creation of life peers which gave the Prime Minister the ability to change the composition of the House of Lords. The House of Lords Act 1999 reduced but did not fully eliminate hereditary peers.

An important change in constitutional law came about with the Fixed-term Parliaments Act 2011, which significantly altered the way in which parliament can be dissolved. Then, following a referendum on EU membership in 2016 that resulted in 51.89% of people voting to leave, the United Kingdom ceased to be a member of the European Union on 31 January 2020. The Fixed-term Parliaments Act, which had impeded resolution of the Brexit controversy in Parliament, was subsequently repealed by the Dissolution and Calling of Parliament Act 2022, reverting the constitutional situation to the status quo ante.

=== Devolution ===
In the First Blair ministry (1997–2001), Labour introduced a large package of constitutional reforms, which the party had promised in its 1997 manifesto. The most significant were:

- The creation of a devolved parliament in Scotland and assemblies in Wales and Northern Ireland, with their own direct elections.
- The creation of a devolved assembly in London and the associated post of a directly elected mayor.
- The beginning of a process of reform of the House of Lords, including the removal of all but 92 hereditary peers.
- The incorporation of the European Convention on Human Rights into UK law by passing the Human Rights Act 1998.
- The passing of the Freedom of Information Act 2000.
- The passing of the Political Parties, Elections and Referendums Act 2000, creating the Electoral Commission to regulate elections and referendums and party spending to an extent.
- The granting of independence over decisions about monetary policy including interest rates to the Bank of England.

The House of Commons voted on seven options in February 2003 on what proportion of elected and appointed members (from 100% elected to 100% appointed) the House of Lords should have. None of the options received a majority.

In 2004, a Joint Committee of the House of Commons and House of Lords tasked with overseeing the drafting of the Civil Contingencies Bill, published its first report, in which, among other things, it suggested amending the bill's clauses that grant Cabinet Ministers the power "to disapply or modify any Act of Parliament" as overly wide, and that the bill should be modified to preclude changes to the following Acts, which, it suggested, formed "the fundamental parts of constitutional law" of the United Kingdom:

- Magna Carta 1215
- Bill of Rights 1689
- Crown and Parliament Recognition Act 1689
- Act of Settlement 1701
- Acts of Union 1707
- Acts of Union 1800
- The Parliament Acts 1911 and 1949
- Life Peerages Act 1958
- Emergency Powers Act 1964
- European Communities Act 1972
- House of Commons Disqualification Act 1975
- Ministerial and Other Salaries Act 1975
- British Nationality Act 1981
- Supreme Court Acts 1981
- Representation of the People Act 1983
- Government of Wales Act 1998
- Human Rights Act 1998
- Northern Ireland Act 1998
- Scotland Act 1998
- House of Lords Act 1999
- And the bill itself (passed as the Civil Contingencies Act 2004)

This amendment was defeated by the government and the bill was passed without it. However, the government partially one recommendation — the Human Rights Act 1998 may not be amended by emergency regulations.

The Constitutional Reform Act 2005 created the Supreme Court of the United Kingdom and guarantees judicial independence.

=== Coalition reforms ===
The Conservative-Liberal Democrat Coalition introduced several reforms including the Constitutional Reform and Governance Act 2010, which reformed the Royal Prerogative and made other significant changes; the Fixed-term Parliaments Act 2011, which introduced fixed-term parliaments of 5 years.

A key Liberal Democrat policy was that of voting reform, to which a referendum took place in May 2011 on whether or not Britain should adopt a system of Alternative Vote to elect MPs to Westminster. However, the proposal was rejected overwhelmingly, with 68% of voters in favour of retaining first-past-the-post.

In late October 2011, the prime ministers of the Commonwealth realms voted to grant gender equality in the line of succession to the British throne, ending male-preference primogeniture. The amendment, once enacted, also ended the ban on the monarch marrying a Catholic. Following the Perth Agreement in 2011, legislation amending the Bill of Rights 1689 and the Act of Settlement 1701 came into effect across the Commonwealth realms on 26 March 2015 which changed the laws of succession to the British throne. In the United Kingdom, it was passed as the Succession to the Crown Act 2013.

=== Further devolution ===
Further powers were devolved under the Government of Wales Act 2006, Northern Ireland Act 2006, Northern Ireland Act 2009, Scotland Act 2012, Wales Act 2014, and the Scotland Act 2016. On 18 September, a referendum was held in Scotland on whether to leave the United Kingdom and become an independent country. The three UK-wide political parties - Labour, Conservative and Liberal Democrats - campaigned together as part of the Better Together campaign while the pro-independence Scottish National Party was the main force in the Yes Scotland campaign, together with the Scottish Greens and the Scottish Socialist Party. Days before the vote, with the opinion polls closing, the three Better Together party leaders issued 'The Vow', a promise of more powers for Scotland in the event of a No vote. The referendum resulted in Scotland voting by 55% to 45% to remain part of the United Kingdom.

The Smith Commission was announced by Prime Minister David Cameron on 19 September 2014 to propose the powers that would be devolved to the Scottish Government. Once the recommendations had been published they were debated in the UK Parliament and a command paper was published in January 2015 putting forward draft legislative proposals. A Scottish Parliament committee report published in May 2015 said that this draft bill did not meet the recommendations of the Smith Commission, specifically in relation to welfare payments. A spokesman for the UK Government said that a full Parliamentary discussion would follow. A bill based on the Smith Commission's recommendations was announced by the UK government in the May 2015 Queen's Speech. The bill subsequently became law as the Scotland Act 2016 in March 2016.

=== Accession to the EU and subsequent withdrawal ===
On 20 February 2016, Prime Minister David Cameron announced that a referendum on the UK's membership of the European Union would be held on 23 June 2016, following years of campaigning by eurosceptics. Debates and campaigns by parties supporting both "Remain" and "Leave" focused on concerns regarding trade and the single market, security, migration and sovereignty. The result of the referendum was in favour of the country leaving the EU with 51.9% of voters wanting to leave. The UK remains a member for the time being, but is expected to invoke Article 50 of the Lisbon Treaty, which would begin negotiations on a withdrawal agreement that will last no more than two years (unless the Council and the UK agree to extend the negotiation period) which will ultimately lead to an exit from the European Union.

In October 2016 the prime minister, Theresa May, promised a "Great Repeal Bill" which would repeal the 1972 European Communities Act and import its regulations into UK law, with effect from the date of British withdrawal. The regulations could then be amended or repealed on a case-by-case basis.

The Supreme Court issued a ruling in January 2017 that an Act of Parliament is needed before the government can trigger Article 50 to leave the European Union.

== Worldwide influence ==
Characterised by the stability of its governing institutions and its capacity to absorb change, the British constitutional system is one of the oldest constitutional systems in the world, dating back to the before the 11th century. Over its history, it has had widespread influence on the constitutional governance and legal systems of other countries around the world, propagating the spread of the principles of the rule of law, parliamentary sovereignty and judicial independence.

Magna Carta and the Parliament of England influenced the history of democracy in the Middle Ages and the early history of parliamentarism.

In the Thirteen Colonies, the Bill of Rights 1689 was one of the influences on the 1776 Virginia Declaration of Rights, which in turn influenced the United States Declaration of Independence later that year. The Constitution of the United States was adopted in 1789 and the United States Bill of Rights was ratified in 1791, both of which were influenced by British constitutional history.

Although not a comprehensive statement of civil and political liberties, the Bill of Rights 1689 stands as one of the landmark documents in the development of civil liberties in the United Kingdom and a model for later, more general, statements of rights, including the United States Bill of Rights, the French Declaration of the Rights of Man and of the Citizen, the United Nations Universal Declaration of Human Rights, and the European Convention on Human Rights. For example, as with the Bill of Rights 1689, the US Constitution prohibits excessive bail and "cruel and unusual punishment". Similarly, "cruel, inhuman or degrading treatment or punishment" is banned under Article 5 of the Universal Declaration of Human Rights and Article 3 of the European Convention on Human Rights. Other concepts developed through British constitutional history, such as protection of individual rights and habeas corpus, have influenced the legal and political systems of other nations around the world.

The modern system of parliament emerged with the Parliament of Great Britain (1707–1800), which contributed to the spread of parliamentarism. The idea of a parliamentary democracy, where the executive is accountable to the legislature and subject to its scrutiny, was replicated in various forms in Europe and around the world. In the 19th and 20th centuries, democratising countries often chose the British model of democracy; many countries that were once part of the British Empire, including Australia, Canada, India and various Commonwealth nations, adopted the Westminster parliamentary system, with its bicameral legislature and the concept of responsible government (see also Representation of the People Act). Thus the Parliament of the United Kingdom is often referred to as the Mother of Parliaments (in fact a misquotation of John Bright, who remarked in 1865 that "England is the Mother of Parliaments") because the British Parliament has been the model for most other parliamentary systems, and its Acts have created many other parliaments.

English common law has served as the template for many countries and has been adopted, adapted, and incorporated into their legal systems. International commercial contracts are often based on English common law. The British Judicial Committee of the Privy Council still serves as the highest court of appeal for twelve former colonies.

== Key statutes ==
Although there is no definitive list of constitutional statutes, there are certain statutes that are significant in the history of the Constitution of the United Kingdom. Some have been repealed, several have been amended and remain in statute, while others are current legislation as originally enacted. None are entrenched, but according to some theories (including obiter dicta in Thoburn v Sunderland City Council) they may be protected from implied repeal.

=== Scottish documents and statutes ===
- Leges inter Brettos et Scottos 1124, Laws of the Brets (Welsh) and Scots
- Declaration of Arbroath 1320, declaration sent to Pope asserting the sovereignty of the people of Scotland
- Claim of Right Act 1689, limiting the power of the Scottish monarch in similar ways to the English Bill of Rights
- Union with England Act 1707, based on the Treaty of Union, abolishing the Scottish Parliament and creating the new Parliament of Great Britain

=== Welsh statutes ===
- Statute of Rhuddlan (1284)

=== English statutes ===
- Magna Carta (1215), a revised version entered statute in 1297 and remains in statute today, although with most articles now repealed
- Provisions of Oxford (1258), an early attempt at replacing absolute monarchy with government by council, and representative parliament
- Provisions of Westminster (1259)
- Statute of Marlborough (1267)
- Laws in Wales Acts 1535 and 1542, by which Wales became a full and equal part of the Kingdom of England with a single legal jurisdiction
- Petition of Right (1628), prohibited taxation without law and quartering of naval personnel in private houses without the owner's consent, and reasserted habeas corpus
- Instrument of Government (1653), first codified constitution of England
- Humble Petition and Advice (1657), second codified constitution of England
- Habeas Corpus Act 1679
- Bill of Rights 1689, declared William and Mary as monarchs and established parliamentary sovereignty
- Act of Settlement 1701, establishing the Protestant succession to the Crown through Sophia of Hanover
- Union with Scotland Act 1706, based on the Treaty of Union, creating the new Parliament of Great Britain

=== Statutes of Great Britain ===
- Wales and Berwick Act 1746, defining "England" legally to include the historically disputed border town of Berwick-upon-Tweed (and, until 1967, Wales)
- Acts of Union 1800, Union with Ireland Act passed by the Parliament of Great Britain. United the Kingdom of Great Britain and the Kingdom of Ireland to form the United Kingdom of Great Britain and Ireland

=== Statutes of the United Kingdom ===
- Representation of the People Acts 1832 to 1969, reforming elections to the House of Commons and extending the electoral franchise, effectively establishing parliamentary democracy
- Interpretation Act 1850, Interpretation Act 1889, Interpretation Act 1978, defining the language used in subsequent enactments
- Parliament Acts 1911 and 1949, restricting the power of the unelected House of Lords to reject bills, enabling the Commons to pass most laws without their consent after a delay
- Government of Ireland Act 1920, Irish Free State (Agreement) Act 1922, Irish Free State Constitution Act 1922, Irish Free State (Consequential Provisions) Act 1922, and Ireland Act 1949, granting autonomy to Ireland and subsequently recognising its independence and republicanism
- Royal and Parliamentary Titles Act 1927, changing the name of the British Parliament and state to reflect the independence of most of Ireland, and authorising the king to change his styles accordingly
- Statute of Westminster 1931, abolishing the power of the British parliament to make laws for the dominions (Canada, Newfoundland, Australia, New Zealand, and originally also Ireland and South Africa), making them de facto independent
- His Majesty's Declaration of Abdication Act 1936, recognising the abduction of Edward VIII and succession of George VI, and disinheriting the former's heirs
- Regency Acts 1937 to 1953, establishing procedures for determining the monarch's minority or incapacity and appointment of a regent to exercise his functions in such a situation
- Statutory Instruments Act 1946, establishing the framework for secondary legislation
- United Nations Act 1946, enabling the government to implement resolutions under Article 41 of the United Nations Charter as Orders in Council without the approval of Parliament
- Life Peerages Act 1958, House of Lords Act 1999, House of Lords Reform Act 2014, House of Lords (Expulsion and Suspension) Act 2015, reforms changing the House of Lords from a mostly hereditary to a mostly appointed body with powers to suspend and expel its members, who are permitted to resign
- Local Government Act 1972, basis of local government in England and Wales, also confirmed Monmouthshire to be part of Wales
  - Local Government Act (Northern Ireland) 1972
  - Local Government (Scotland) Act 1973
  - Amended by Local Government (Wales) Act 1994
- European Communities Act 1972, providing for direct effect of EEC (later EU) regulations in UK law
  - European Union Act 2011, requiring a referendum before ratifying any changes to the EU treaties
  - Repealed by the European Union (Withdrawal) Act 2018, in force 2020, also creating a new class of retained EU law
- Northern Ireland Constitution Act 1973, replacing the defunct Parliament of Northern Ireland with the short-lived Northern Ireland Assembly
- Human Rights Act 1998, making the European Convention on Human Rights (and protocols ratified by the UK) cognizable in UK law without need for recourse to the European Court of Human Rights, and binding public authorities by it
- Scotland Act 1998, Government of Wales Act 1998, Northern Ireland Act 1998, acts of devolution
  - Amended by the Government of Wales Act 2006, Northern Ireland Act 2006, Northern Ireland Act 2009, Scotland Act 2012, Wales Act 2014, Scotland Act 2016
- Freedom of Information Act 2000, requiring transparency of decision making for public authorities
- Political Parties, Elections and Referendums Act 2000, Elections Act 2022, regulating elections
- Civil Contingencies Act 2004, enabling the government to suspend laws in a state of emergency
- Constitutional Reform Act 2005, transferring the judicial functions of the House of Lords to the newly (2009) created Supreme Court, reforming the role of the Lord Chancellor and creating the post of Speaker of the House of Lords
- Constitutional Reform and Governance Act 2010, putting the Civil Service on a statutory footing and requiring treaties to be laid before parliament before ratification
- Fixed-term Parliaments Act 2011, abolishing the royal prerogative of dissolution, requiring a two-thirds majority to call an election before parliament's five-year term expires
  - Repealed by the Dissolution and Calling of Parliament Act 2022, which restored the prerogative
- Succession to the Crown Act 2013, altering the succession to abolish male preference, so the eldest child of the Sovereign is heir apparent regardless of sex

== See also ==
- Ancient constitution of England
- Basic Law
- Constitutional reform in the United Kingdom
- Fundamental Laws of England
- History of England
- History of the United Kingdom
- Rights of Englishmen
- Separation of powers in the United Kingdom
- United Kingdom constitutional law
