= Mother of parliaments =

British political phrase

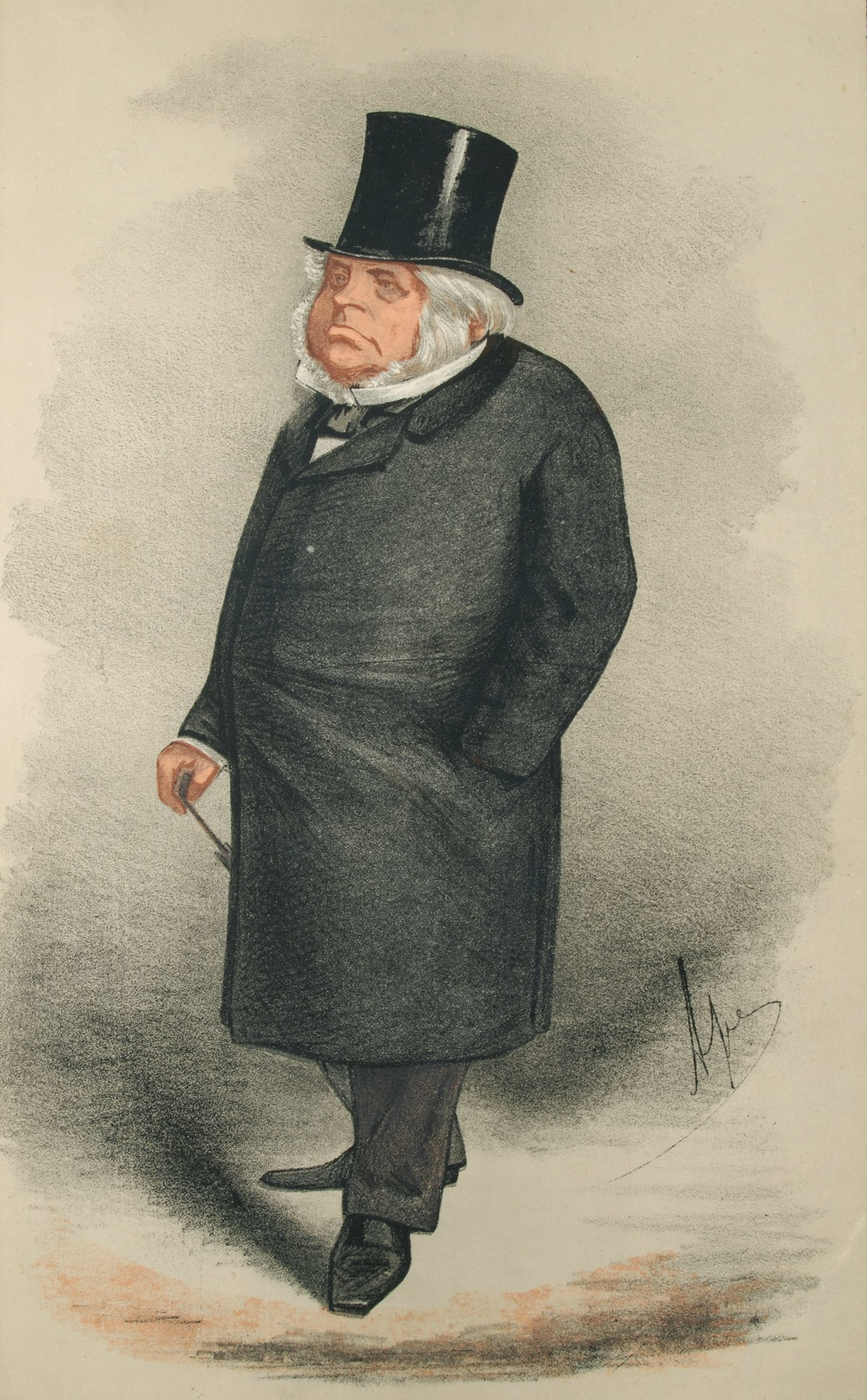
John Bright in an 1869 cartoon.

"The mother of parliaments" is a phrase coined by the British politician and reformer John Bright in a speech in Birmingham on 18 January 1865.

It was a reference to England. His actual words were: "England is the mother of parliaments". This was reported in The Times on the following day. However, the phrase is also applied to the Parliament of the United Kingdom because of the adoption of the Westminster model of parliamentary democracy by many countries of the former British Empire.

== See also ==
- History of democracy
- History of parliamentarism
- Parliament of England
- Constitution of the United Kingdom
- Parliament in the Making
- Parliamentary system
- Parliamentary sovereignty
- The History of Parliament
- Ancient constitution of England
