= Rights of Englishmen =

Historical rights of English people

The "rights of Englishmen" are the traditional rights of English subjects and later English-speaking subjects of the British Crown.

In the 18th century, some of the colonists who objected to British rule in the thirteen British North American colonies that would become the United States of America argued that their traditional rights as Englishmen were being denied by the Crown and the British Parliament. The colonists sought to retain the rights they or their ancestors had traditionally enjoyed in Britain, including the guarantee of a local, representative government. Their demands were especially focused on issues of judicial fairness such as opposition to being transported to England for trial and the principle of no taxation without representation. Defense of these rights subsequently became a widely accepted motivation and justification for the American Revolution.

== Historical background ==
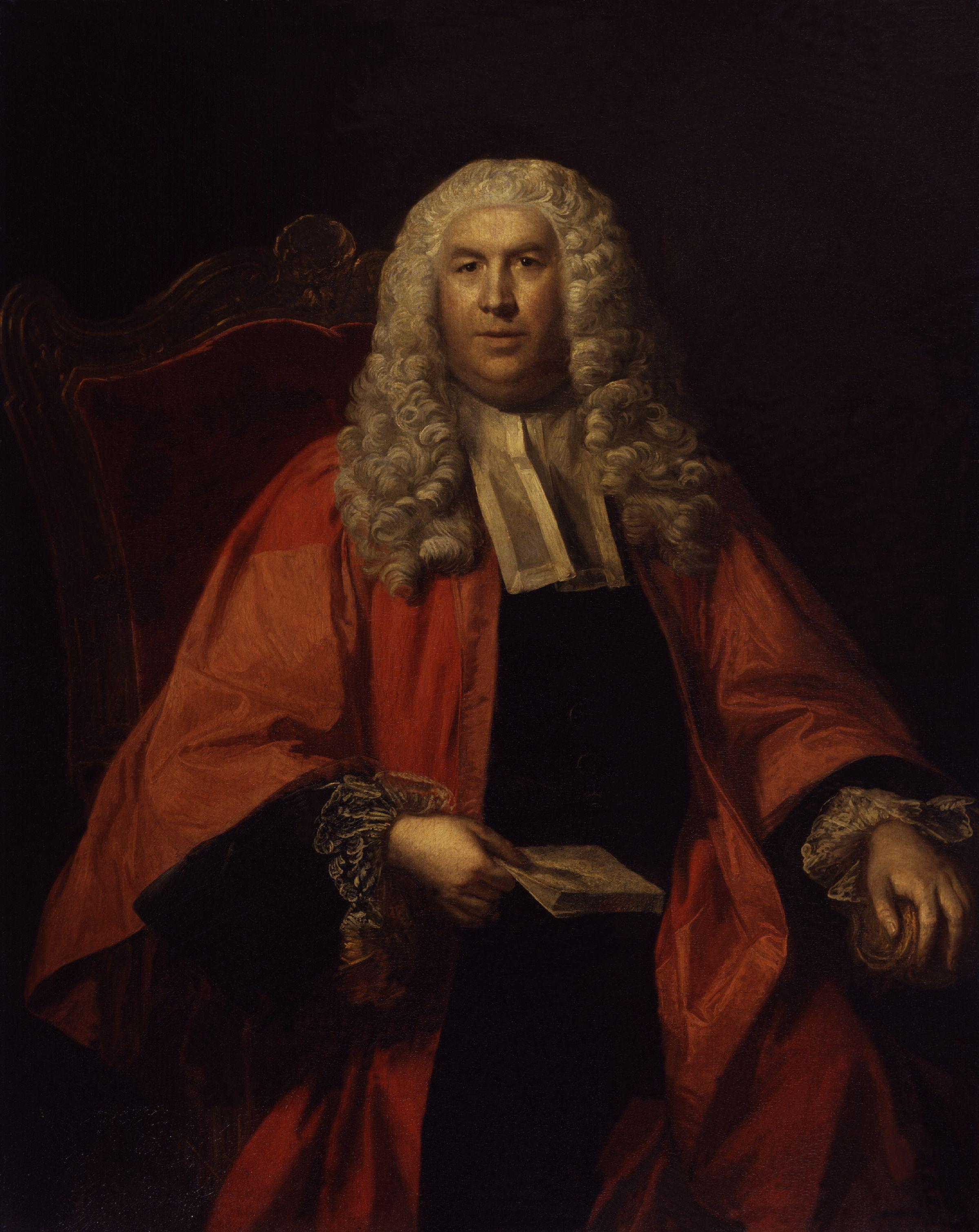
18th-century English jurist William Blackstone attempted to explain the rights of English citizens.

In the tradition of Whig history, Judge William Blackstone called them "The absolute rights of every Englishman". He described the Fundamental Laws of England in his influential Commentaries on the Laws of England (1765), in which he explained how they had been established slowly over centuries of English constitutional history. They were certain basic rights that all subjects of the English monarch were understood to be entitled to, such as those expressed in Magna Carta since 1215, the Petition of Right in 1628, the Habeas Corpus Act 1679 and the Bill of Rights 1689.

In a legal case that came to be known as Calvin's Case, or the Case of the Postnati, the Law Lords decided in 1608 that Scotsmen born after King James I united Scotland and England (the postnati) had all the rights of Englishmen. This decision would have a subsequent effect on the concept of the "rights of Englishmen" in British America.

== Legacy in United States law ==
The American colonies had since the 17th century been fertile ground for liberalism within the centre of European political discourse in the Age of Enlightenment. However, as the ratification of the Declaration of Independence approached, the issue among the colonists of which particular rights were significant became divisive. George Mason, one of the Founding Fathers of the United States, stated that "We claim nothing but the liberty and privileges of Englishmen in the same degree, as if we had continued among our brethren in Great Britain."

Owing to its inclusion in the standard legal treatises of the 19th century, (Note: Compiled by Edward Coke, William Blackstone, and James Kent.) Calvin's Case was well known in the early judicial history of the United States. Consideration of the case by the United States Supreme Court and by state courts transformed it into a rule regarding American citizenship and solidified the concept of jus soli – the right by which nationality or citizenship can be recognised to any individual born in the territory of the related state – as the primary determining factor controlling the acquisition of citizenship by birth.

The Supreme Court Justice Joseph P. Bradley asserted that the "rights of Englishmen" were a foundation of American law in his dissenting opinion on the Slaughter-House Cases, the first Supreme Court interpretation of the Fourteenth Amendment to the United States Constitution, in 1873. (Note: In his dissenting decision, Bradley wrote: The people of this country brought with them to its shores the rights of Englishmen, the rights which had been wrested from English sovereigns at various periods of the nation's history.... England has no written constitution, it is true, but it has an unwritten one, resting in the acknowledged, and frequently declared, privileges of Parliament and the people, to violate which in any material respect would produce a revolution in an hour. A violation of one of the fundamental principles of that constitution in the Colonies, namely, the principle that recognizes the property of the people as their own, and which, therefore, regards all taxes for the support of government as gifts of the people through their representatives, and regards taxation without representation as subversive of free government, was the origin of our own revolution.)

== See also ==
- Civil and political rights
- Civil liberties in the United Kingdom
- First Charter of Virginia
- Natural and legal rights
- Parliament in the Making
- Roman citizenship
- English Bill of Rights

== Bibliography ==
- Aptheker, Herbert (1960). The American Revolution, 1763–1783: a history of the American people: an interpretation. International Publishers. p. 107. ISBN 978-0-7178-0005-6. "It is true that the colonists had insisted that they were seeking "the rights of Englishmen", but insisting upon this in the face of rulers who declare that colonists do not have such rights is revolutionary, though the rights themselves might not be new."
- Heale, M. J. (1986). The American Revolution. Taylor & Francis. p. 16. ISBN 978-0-416-38910-4.
- Hulsebosch, Daniel J. (2003). "The Ancient Constitution and the Expanding Empire: Sir Edward Coke's British Jurisprudence". Law and History Review. 21 (3): 439–482. doi:10.2307/3595117. JSTOR 3595117. S2CID 232399735. Archived from the original on 29 August 2012.
- Miller, John Chester (1959). Origins of the American Revolution (2nd ed.). Stanford University Press. p. 168. ISBN 978-0-8047-0593-6. "As long as the rights of Englishmen remained the goal, most Americans warmly supported the patriot leaders; when the rights of Americans and independence Great Britain were put forward, the colonists began to divide into hostile camps."
- Pearson, Ellen Holmes (2005). "Revising Custom, Embracing Choice: Early American Legal Scholars and the Republicanization of Common Law". In Gould, Eliga H.; Onuf, Peter S. (eds.). Empire And Nation: The American Revolution In The Atlantic World. Baltimore: Johns Hopkins University Press. p. 102. ISBN 0-8018-7912-4.
- Price, Polly J. (1997). "Natural Law and Birthright Citizenship in Calvin's Case (1608)". Yale Journal of Law & the Humanities. 9: 73.
- Slavin, Arthur J. (January 1983). "Craw v. Ramsey: New Light on an Old Debate". In Baxter, Stephen Bartow (ed.). England's Rise to Greatness, 1660–1763. University of California Press. pp. 31–32. ISBN 9780520045729.
- Swindler, William F. (May 1976). ""Rights of Englishmen" Since 1776: Some Anglo-American Notes". University of Pennsylvania Law Review. 124 (5): 1083–103. doi:10.2307/3311594. JSTOR 3311594.
- Tindall, George Brown (1984). America: a narrative history. New York: Norton. ISBN 9780393954357.
- Zuckert, Michael (2003). Greene, Jack P.; Pole, J. R. (eds.). A Companion to the American Revolution. Chapter 88, "Rights": Wiley–Blackwell. p. 691. ISBN 978-1-4051-1674-9 https://books.google.com/books?id=u6UiHVpkiN8C&pg=PA691. "[The American colonists' position depended] not on natural law, but on traditional notions of the rights of Englishmen, the royal charters of the separate colonies and especially on 'long standing constitutional custom'."
