= Fundamental Laws of England =

History of English constitutions and legal principles

In the 1760s William Blackstone described the Fundamental Laws of England in Commentaries on the Laws of England, Book the First – Chapter the First : Of the Absolute Rights of Individuals as "the absolute rights of every Englishman" and traced their basis and evolution as follows:

- Magna Carta between King John and his barons in 1215
- confirmation of Magna Carta by King Henry III to Parliament in 1216, 1217 and 1225
- Confirmatio Cartarum (Confirmation of Charters) by King Edward I in 1297
- a multitude of subsequent corroborating statutes, from King Edward I to King Henry IV
- the Petition of Right, a parliamentary declaration in 1628 of the liberties of the people, assented to by King Charles I
- more concessions made by King Charles I to his Parliament
- many laws, particularly the Habeas Corpus Act 1679, passed under King Charles II
- the Bill of Rights 1689 assented to by King William III and Queen Mary II
- the Act of Settlement 1701

Blackstone's list was an 18th-century constitutional view, and the Union of the Crowns had occurred in 1603 between Kingdom of England and Kingdom of Scotland, and the 1628 Petition of Right had already referred to the fundamental laws being violated.

== Recorded usage ==
The phrase Fundamental Laws of England has often been used by those opposing particular legislative, royal or religious initiatives.

For example, in 1641 the House of Commons of England protested that the Roman Catholic Church was "subverting the fundamental laws of England and Ireland", part of a campaign ending in 1649 with the beheading of King Charles I.

Subsequently, the phrase was used by the Leveller Lt. Col. John Lilburne (later to become a Quaker) accusing the House of Lords and House of Commons of tyranny in The Just Defence of John Lilburne, Against Such as charge him with Turbulency of Spirit. Lilburne also wrote a 1646 book called The Legal Fundamental Liberties of the People of England, asserted, revived and vindicated.

Also in 1646, the General Court of Massachusetts referred to the Fundamental Laws of England in regard to Magna Carta, while defending their representative and legislative autonomy in their address to the Long Parliament.

In his 1670 trial, William Penn called upon the phrase many times, including "However, this I leave upon your Consciences, who are of the Jury (and my sole Judges) that if these Ancient Fundamental Laws, which relate to Liberty and Property, and (are not limited to particular Persuasions in Matters of Religion) must not be indispensably maintained and observed, Who can say he hath Right to the Coat upon his Back?" The aftermath of the trial established Bushell's Case, preventing a jury from being fined for its verdict.

In the 1774 pamphlet American Claim of Rights, South Carolina's Chief Justice William Drayton wrote

That the Americans being descended from the same ancestors with the people of England, and owing fealty to the same Crown, are therefore equally with them, entitled to the common law of England formed by their common ancestors; and to all and singular the benefits, rights, liberties and claims specified in Magna Charta, in the petition of Rights, in the Bill of Rights, and in the Act of Settlement. They being no more than principally declaratory of the grounds of the fundamental laws of England.

Other famous subscribers to the phrase include Sir Edward Coke (1522–1634), Emerich de Vattel (1714–1767), and Samuel Adams (1722–1803).

== Unwritten history ==
Locke's view in Two Treatises of Government (1690) was "that being all equal and independent, no one ought to harm another in his life, health, liberty or possessions". This philosophy was in keeping with the view that the Fundamental Laws predated Magna Carta in both custom and natural law. Influenced by Locke, the 1776 United States Declaration of Independence stated: "We hold these truths to be self-evident, that all men are created equal, that they are endowed by their Creator with certain inalienable Rights, that among these are Life, Liberty and the pursuit of Happiness."

For those who believed that the Fundamental Laws of England predated Magna Carta, there was debate about whether they arose from time immemorial, were somehow immanent to society, from post-Roman Saxon times, or from various combinations of these and other origins.

== 20th century and later ==
In MacCormick v. Lord Advocate (1953), an action over the legitimacy of the numeric Style of the British Sovereign, asserting only the style Elizabeth I for Elizabeth II would only carry legal authority in Scotland Lord President Cooper gave judicial recognition to the concept of a "fundamental law" of Scotland that merged with that of England into the law of Great Britain at the time of the Act of Union 1707, a corpus of law which the supremacy of Parliament may not extend to altering, as "the principle of unlimited sovereignty of Parliament is a distinctively English principle and has no counterpart in Scottish constitutional law". He raised as a hypothetical consideration the question of whether such fundamental laws could be judged by an English or Scottish court in the same manner as other countries consider constitutional cases. However, he left the matter open, saying "I reserve my opinion."

The doctrine of parliamentary supremacy was upheld in the Privy Council by Lord Reid in 1969:

It is often said that it would be unconstitutional for the United Kingdom Parliament to do certain things, meaning that the moral, political and other reasons against doing them are so strong that most people would regard it as highly improper if Parliament did these things. But that does not mean that it is beyond the power of Parliament to do such things. If Parliament chose to do any of them the courts would not hold the Act of Parliament invalid.

Under this precedent, Parliament has the legal authority to do anything, even though its Acts might contradict common-law principles of natural justice. The classic rebuttal or at least qualification is expressed by Albert Venn Dicey, whose 1885 text Introduction to the Study of the Law of the Constitution argues that the will of the electorate must ultimately prevail over any attempt at tyranny: it is "a political, not a legal fact" that fundamental principles of natural justice cannot be denied. This implies that in most scenarios principles of the Fundamental Laws can be upheld by statutory interpretation or as an alternative since 1998 by issuing a declaration of incompatibility with the European Convention on Human Rights.

Laws LJ in Thoburn v Sunderland City Council [2002] EWHC 195 (Admin) at [62] recognised what he called "constitutional statutes":

In the present state of its maturity the common law has come to recognise that there exist rights which should properly be classified as constitutional or fundamental: see for example such cases as Simms [2000] 2 AC 115 per Lord Hoffmann at 131, Pierson v Secretary of State [1998] AC 539, [R v] Leech [1994] QB 198, Derbyshire County Council v Times Newspapers Ltd. [1993] AC 534, and [R v] Witham [1998] QB 575. And from this a further insight follows. We should recognise a hierarchy of Acts of Parliament as it were: "ordinary" statutes and "constitutional" statutes. The two categories must be distinguished on a principled basis. In my opinion a constitutional statute is one which (a) conditions the legal relationship between citizen and State in some general, overarching manner, or (b) enlarges or diminishes the scope of what we would now regard as fundamental constitutional rights. (a) and (b) are of necessity closely related: it is difficult to think of an instance of (a) that is not also an instance of (b). The special status of constitutional statutes follows the special status of constitutional rights. Examples are the Magna Carta, the Bill of Rights 1689, the Act of Union, the Reform Acts which distributed and enlarged the franchise, the HRA, the Scotland Act 1998 and the Government of Wales Act 1998. The ECA clearly belongs in this family. It incorporated the whole corpus of substantive Community rights and obligations, and gave overriding domestic effect to the judicial and administrative machinery of Community law. It may be there has never been a statute having such profound effects on so many dimensions of our daily lives. The ECA is, by force of the common law, a constitutional statute. (cf obiter remarks by the House of Lords in Watkins v Home Office [2006] UKHL 17 at [62])

In 2004 the Joint Committee of the House of Commons and House of Lords overseeing the drafting of the Civil Contingencies Bill published its first report in which, among other things, suggested:

- Amending the proposed clauses, operative in a State of Emergency, that would grant the Cabinet, by Emergency Regulations, the power "to disapply or modify any Act of Parliament" on the grounds that such a clause is overly wide.
- An amendment to preclude changes to the following Acts, which, it suggested, formed "the fundamental parts of constitutional law" of the United Kingdom:

- Magna Carta 1215
- Bill of Rights 1689
- Crown and Parliament Recognition Act 1689
- Act of Settlement 1701
- Union with Scotland Act 1707
- Union with Ireland Act 1800
- Parliament Acts 1911 and 1949
- Life Peerages Act 1958
- Emergency Powers Act 1964
- European Communities Act 1972
- House of Commons Disqualification Act 1975
- Ministerial and Other Salaries Act 1975
- British Nationality Act 1981
- Supreme Court Act 1981
- Representation of the People Act 1983
- Government of Wales Act 1998
- Human Rights Act 1998
- Northern Ireland Act 1998
- Scotland Act 1998
- House of Lords Act 1999
- And the bill itself (which became the Civil Contingencies Act 2004)

The amendment was defeated and the bill passed without it, although the government did partially implement one recommendation—the Human Rights Act 1998 may not be amended by emergency regulations.

== See also ==
- Common law
- Royal prerogative
- History of the constitution of the United Kingdom
