= History of parliamentarism =

Countries with prime ministers (blue), those that formerly had that position (dark red) and those that never had that position (gray).

The first parliaments date back to the Middle Ages. While UNESCO considers the Cortes of León (1188) in current day Spain as the earliest documentary manifestation with the presence of the common people, the Parliament of Sicily is frequently cited by historiography as one of the earliest precursors of parliamentary institutions in Europe. Originating from the assemblies convened by Roger II of Sicily in 1130, it evolved into a formalized structure that anticipated many features of later European parliaments.

The concept of parliamentary government also evolved and developed in the Kingdom of England, with the first English parliament to include ordinary citizens from the towns taking place in 1265. During the early modern period, this culminated in the Glorious Revolution of 1688 which ensured that, unlike much of the rest of Europe at the time, royal absolutism would not prevail. The Parliament of Great Britain (1707-1800) established the primacy of parliamentary sovereignty, through which the rule of law could be enforced.

An early example of parliamentary government also occurred in today's Netherlands and Belgium during the Dutch revolt in 1581, when the sovereign, legislative and executive powers were taken over by the States General of the Netherlands from the then-monarch, King Philip II of Spain.

The United States chose to adopt a presidential system under the United States Constitution, rather than a parliamentary system.

The revolutions of 1848 in Europe largely failed to strengthen parliaments in most European countries, as conservative forces regained control and reversed changes, but they made a return to the pre-1848 status quo impossible, leading to gradual, long-term parliamentary development across much of Europe.

== Proto-parliamentary institutions ==
Since ancient times, when societies were tribal, there were councils or a headman whose decisions were assessed by village elders. This is often referred to as tribalism. Some scholars argue that in ancient Mesopotamia there was a primitive democratic government where the kings were assessed by council. The same has been said about ancient India, where some form of assemblies existed, and therefore there was some form of democracy. However, these claims are not accepted by most scholars, who see these forms of government as oligarchies.

=== Europe ===
Ancient Athens was the cradle of democracy. The Athenian assembly (ἐκκλησία ekklesia) was the most important institution, and every male of Athenian citizenship above the age of thirty could take part in the discussions; however, no women, no men under the age of thirty, and none of the many thousands of slaves were allowed to participate. However, Athenian democracy was not representative, but rather direct, and therefore the ekklesia was not a parliamentary system.

The Roman Republic, established in the 6th century BC, had legislative assemblies, who had the final say regarding the election of magistrates, the enactment of new statutes, the carrying out of capital punishment, the declaration of war and peace, and the creation (or dissolution) of alliances. The Roman Senate was not the ancestor or predecessor of modern parliamentarism in any sense, because the Roman senate was not a legislative body. The Roman Senate controlled money, administration, and the details of foreign policy.

In Anglo-Saxon England, the Witenagamot was an important political institution. The name derives from the Old English ƿitena ȝemōt, or witena gemōt, for "meeting of wise men". The first recorded act of a witenagemot was the law code issued by King Æthelberht of Kent ca. 600, the earliest document which survives in sustained Old English prose; however, the witan was certainly in existence long before this time. The Witan, along with the folkmoots (local assemblies), is an important ancestor of the early-modern English parliament.

=== Ancient Iran ===
Some Muslim scholars argue that the Islamic shura (a method of taking decisions in Islamic societies) is analogous to a parliament. However, others (notably from Hizb ut-Tahrir) disagree, highlighting some fundamental differences between the shura system and the parliamentary system.

The first recorded signs of a council to decide on different issues in ancient Iran dates back to 247 BC, the time of the Parthian Empire. Parthians established the first Iranian empire since the conquest of Persia by Alexander and by their early years of reigning, an assembly of the nobles called “Mehestan” was formed that made the final decision on very serious issues.

The word "Mehestan" consists of two parts: "Meh", a word of the old Persian origin, which literally means "The Great" and "-stan", a suffix in the Persian language, which means “place”. Altogether Mehestan means a place where the greats come together.

The Mehestan Assembly, which consisted of Zoroastrian religious leaders and clan elders exerted great influence over the administration of the kingdom.

One of the most important decisions of the council was made in 208 AD, when a civil war broke out and the Mehestan decided that the empire would be ruled by two brothers simultaneously, Ardavan V and Blash V. In 224 AD, following the dissolution of the Parthian empire after over 470 years, the Mahestan council came to an end.

== Early parliaments in the Middle Ages ==
In 930, the first assembly of the Alþingi was convened at Þingvellir in Iceland, becoming an early example of a parliament.

A significant strand of historiography attributes to the Kingdom of Sicily the primacy of developing one of the first parliamentary structures. The origins can be traced back to 1130, when Roger II convened the Curiae generales in Palermo. Initially composed of nobles and ecclesiastics in a feudal context, these assemblies established an essential link between the monarchy and the subjects.

The institution evolved significantly under the Swabians. Between 1232 and 1240, Frederick II institutionalized the periodic convocations and, crucially, extended participation to the representatives of the "demesne" cities (autonomous cities). This inclusion of the urban class alongside the ecclesiastical and military (feudal) branches anticipated the structure of the "three branches" (tre bracci) that would characterize the Sicilian Parliament for centuries, marking it as a constitutional vanguard in the European context.

The first parliamentary bodies involving representatives of the urban middle class were summoned in 12th century Spain. In 1187, the Leonese King Alfonso IX summoned representatives of the nobility, the church, and representatives of the 50 most important cities, to a council in San Esteban de Gormaz, Soria. There was another meeting with representatives of the cities in Carrión de los Condes, Palencia, the next year, which institutionalized the Curiae. There had been other meetings previously, such as the Concilium of 1135, but they were exceptional and not leading to a regular attendance of town representatives. According to the UNESCO Memory of the World Programme, this is the earliest documented manifestation of the European parliamentary system with some temporal continuity.

The Cortes of León from year 1188 was a parliamentary body in the medieval Kingdom of León. After coming to power, King Alfonso IX, potentially facing an attack by his two neighbours, Castile and Portugal, decided to summon the "Royal Curia". This was a medieval organisation composed of aristocrats and bishops but because of the seriousness of the situation and the need to maximise political support, Alfonso IX took the decision to also call the representatives of the urban middle class from the most important cities of the kingdom to the assembly. León's Cortes dealt with matters like the right to private property, the inviolability of domicile, the right to appeal to justice opposite the King and the obligation of the King to consult the Cortes before entering a war.

A parliament has been in function in the Patria del Friuli between 1231 and 1805.

The second oldest recorded parliamentary body in Europe were the Portuguese Cortes of 1254 held in Leiria in 1254. These included burgher delegates and introduced the monetagio system, a fixed sum to be paid by burghers to the Crown. Property rights of the king and his subjects, as well as of ecclesiastical bodies, were addressed in the previous Cortes of Coimbra in 1211 (which included members of the nobility and the clergy). The Portuguese Cortes met again in 1256, 1261 and 1273 under Afonso III of Portugal, always by royal summon.

In the realms of the Crown of Aragon, the institutional system effectively limited powers of the monarchs. Particularly, in the Principality of Catalonia, in 1283, the Catalan Courts (Corts Catalanes) became the first parliament of Europe that obtained the power to pass legislation, alongside the monarch. Through the next centuries, the Courts developed an extensive regulation of its internal operation and guarantee of rights for the inhabitants; in 1481, the Catalan Courts passed the Constitució de l'Observança, establishing the submission of the king and its officers to the laws of the Principality.

In England, Simon de Montfort is remembered as one of the fathers of representative government for holding two famous parliaments. The first, in 1258, stripped the King of unlimited authority and the second, in 1265, included ordinary citizens from the towns.

In Scotland, the Parliament of Scotland developed during the 13th century from the King's Council of bishops and earls to include burgh representatives participating in decision making and, by the early 14th century, the attendance of knights and freeholders.

== Britain and the Commonwealth ==
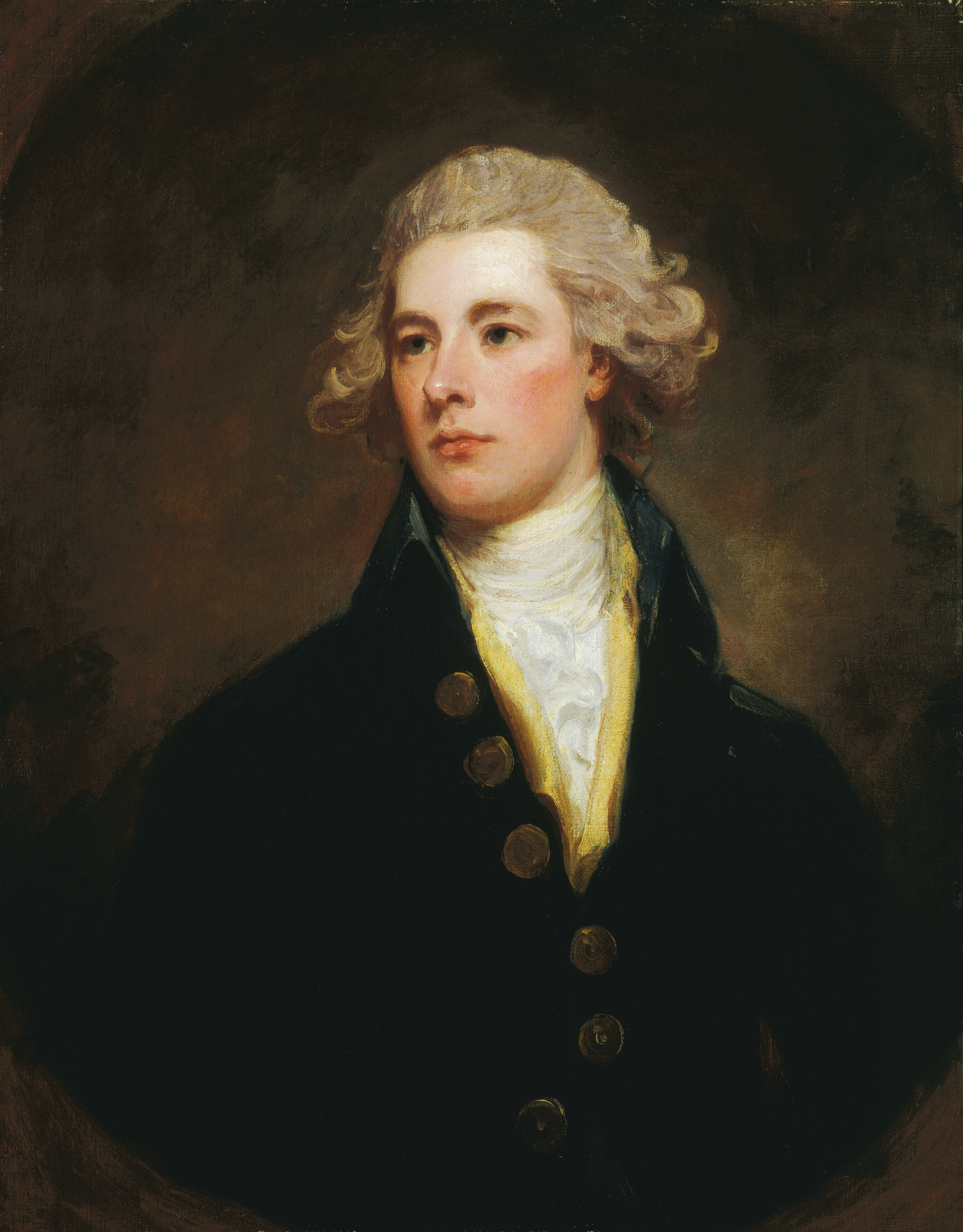
William Pitt the Younger in 1783, by George Romney

In the 17th century, during the early modern period, the Parliament of England pioneered some of the ideas and systems of liberal democracy culminating in the Glorious Revolution and passage of the Bill of Rights 1689 and Claim of Right Act 1689 in Scotland. The Glorious Revolution marked the beginning of the English constitutional monarchy and its role as one of the three elements of government.

In the Kingdom of Great Britain, the monarch, in theory, chaired cabinet and chose ministers. In practice, King George I's inability to speak English led the responsibility for chairing cabinet to go to the leading minister, literally the prime or first minister, Robert Walpole. The gradual democratisation of Parliament with the broadening of the voting franchise increased Parliament's role in controlling government, and in deciding who the king could ask to form a government. By the 19th century, the Great Reform Act 1832 led to parliamentary dominance, with its choice invariably deciding who was prime minister and the complexion of the government.

Other countries gradually adopted what came to be called the Westminster model of government, with an executive answerable to parliament (fusion of powers), but exercising powers nominally vested in the head of state, in the name of the head of state. Hence the use of phrases like Her Majesty's government or His Excellency's government. The British government initially resisted calls for the implementation of parliamentary democracy and what reformers in Upper Canada called responsible government in its colonies, preferring a colonial executive accountable to the British government rather than to the local population. This led to the Rebellions of 1837–1838 in Upper and Lower Canada, and after the rebellions, reformers continued to advocate for responsible government in the the United Canadas and Nova Scotia. In 1846, the British government instructed its governors to allow the implementation of responsible government in those provinces. Afterwards, the same system was implemented in a variety of other British dominions, such as Australia, New Zealand, the Irish Free State and the Union of South Africa. Some of these parliaments evolved, were reformed from, or were initially developed as distinct from their original British model: the Australian Senate, for instance, has since its inception more closely reflected the US Senate than the British House of Lords; whereas since 1950 there is no upper house in New Zealand.

== United States ==
The United States chose to use a presidential system rather than a parliamentary system. Specifically, it adopted the United States Constitution in 1787 to replace the Articles of Confederation.

During the Confederation period (1781 to 1789), the Articles proved ineffective. They established a unicameral body called the United States in Congress Assembled, with no chief executive or court system. It lacked the power to levy taxes, regulate foreign or interstate commerce, or effectively negotiate with foreign powers.

In Federalist No. 69, published in 1788, Alexander Hamilton described the powers of George III. Despite nominally being a constitutional monarch, he retained considerable powers. Hamilton said that the powers of the president of the United States were “in substance much inferior” to George III’s powers in the 1780s.

At the time, the Acts of Union 1800 had not yet occurred, and William Pitt the Younger was prime minister. Prime ministers could be forced to resign by the monarch due to policy disagreements. It was only until the 1802 United Kingdom general election that true parliamentary sovereignty was achieved. Pitt had been forced to resign in 1801 due to George III’s opposition to Catholic emancipation.

== France ==
France swung between different styles of presidential, semi-presidential and parliamentary systems of government. France ultimately ended up with a semi-presidential system under the French Third Republic.

Parliamentary systems under Louis XVIII, Charles X, the July Monarchy under Louis-Philippe I and the Third Republic and Fourth Republic, though the extent of full parliamentary control differed in each, from one extreme under Charles X (a strong head of state) to full parliamentary control (under the Third Republic). Napoleon III offered attempts at some degree of parliamentary control of the executive, though few regarded his regime as genuinely parliamentary and democratic. A presidential system existed under the short-lived Second Republic. The extant Fifth Republic system combines aspects of presidentialism and parliamentarianism.

Parliamentarism in France differed from parliamentarism in the United Kingdom in several ways. First, the French National Assembly had more power over the cabinet than the British Parliament had over its cabinet. Second, France had shorter lived premierships. In the seventy years of the Third Republic, France had over fifty premierships.

In 1980 Maurice Duverger claimed that the Fifth Republic was a government in which the president was supreme, a virtual king. More recent analyses of France's system have downgraded the importance of the French president. During cohabitation, when the National Assembly of France and presidency are controlled by opposite parties, the French president is rather weak. Thus, some scholars see the French system as not one that is half presidential and half parliamentary, but as one that alternates between presidentialism and parliamentarism.

== Spread of parliamentarism in Europe ==
The revolutions of 1848 in Europe largely failed to strengthen parliaments in most European countries, as conservative forces regained control and reversed changes, but they made a return to the pre-1848 status quo impossible, leading to gradual, long-term parliamentary development across much of Europe.

An early example of parliamentary government occurred in today's Netherlands and Belgium during the Dutch revolt in 1581, when the sovereign, legislative and executive powers were taken over by the States General of the Netherlands from the then-monarch, King Philip II of Spain.

During the 19th-century, urbanisation, the Industrial Revolution and, modernism fueled the political left's struggle for democracy and parliamentarism. Democracy and parliamentarism became increasingly prevalent in Europe in the years after World War I, partially imposed by the democratic victors, Great Britain and France, on the defeated countries and their successors, notably Germany's Weimar Republic and the new Austrian Republic. In the radicalised times at the end of World War I, democratic reforms were often seen as a means to counter popular revolutionary currents. Thus established democratic regimes suffered however from limited popular support, in particular from the political right.

Another obstacle was the political parties' unpreparedness for long-term commitments to coalition cabinets in the multi-party democracies on the European continent. The resulting "Minority-Parliamentarism" led to frequent defeats in votes of confidence and almost perpetual political crisis which further diminished the standing of democracy and parliamentarism in the eyes of the electorate.

Many early 20th-century regimes failed through political instability and/or the interventions of heads of state, notably King Victor Emmanuel III of Italy's failure to back his government when facing the threat posed by Benito Mussolini in 1922, or the support given by King Alfonso XIII of Spain to a prime minister using dictatorial powers in the 1920s. Finland is sometimes given as a counter-example, where a presidential democracy was established after a failed revolution and more than three months of bitter Civil War in Finland (1918). In 1932 the Lapua Movement attempted a coup d'état, aiming at the exclusion of Social Democrats from political power, but the Conservative President Svinhufvud maintained his democratic government. Parliamentarism was (re-)introduced by Svinhufvud's successor Kyösti Kallio in 1937.

== See also ==
- Democratisation § Historical cases
- History of democracy
- List of democracy and elections-related topics
- List of political systems in France
- Parliament in the Making
- Prime minister
- Parliamentary sovereignty
- Responsible government
- Sejm of the Polish–Lithuanian Commonwealth
- The History of Parliament
