= Battle of Pinkie =

Part of the Rough Wooing (10 September 1547)

- Part of the Rough Wooing
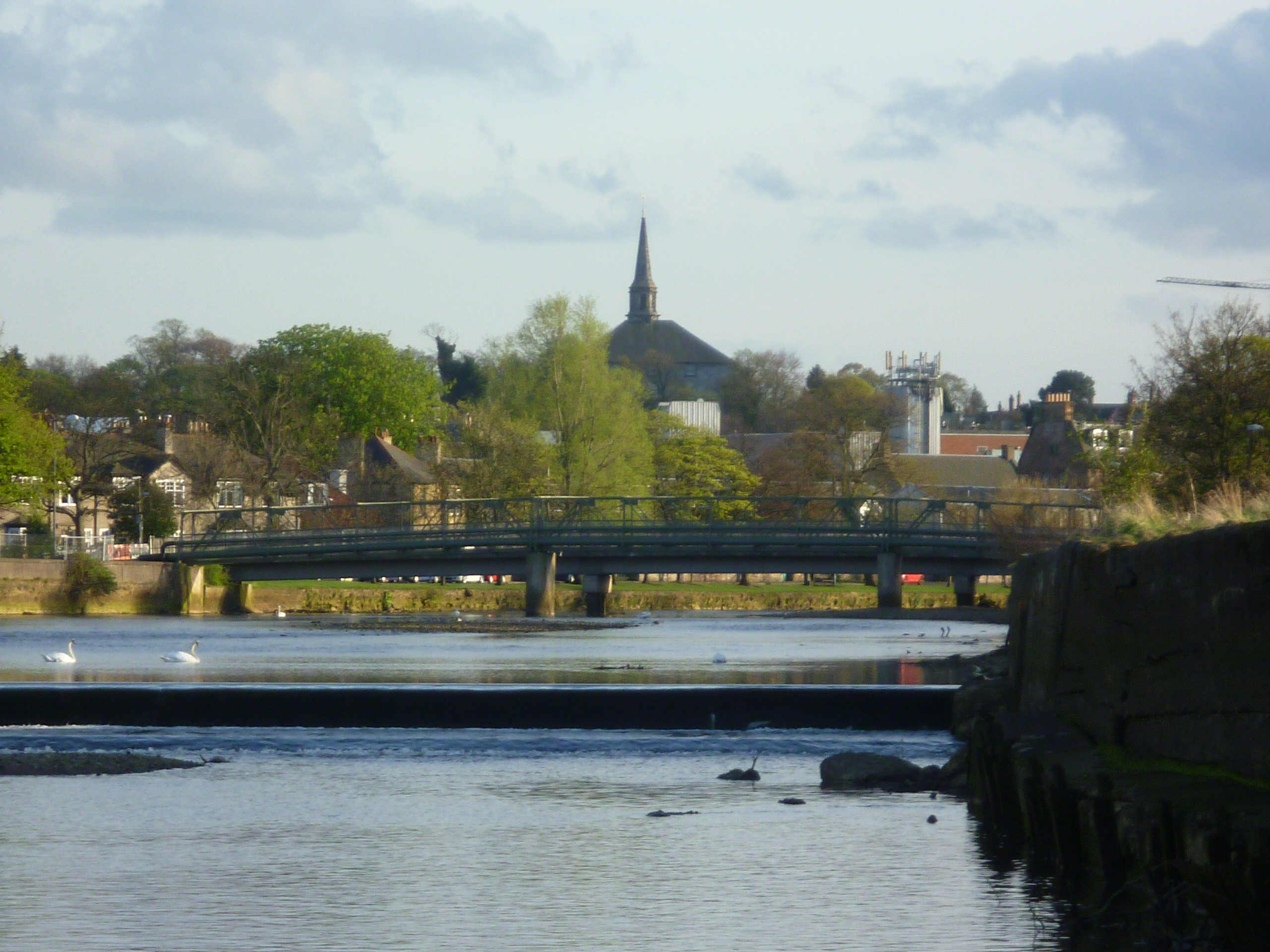
- River Esk and Inveresk Church at Musselburgh
Date	10 September 1547
Location	Musselburgh, Lothian, Scotland 55.9304°N 3.0211°W
Result	English victory

Belligerents
Scotland	England

Commanders and leaders
Earl of Arran	Duke of Somerset

Strength
22,000–36,000	c. 30 warships, 16,800 men

Casualties and losses
6,000–15,000 killed or wounded, 2,000 captured	200–600 killed or wounded

Registered battlefield
- Designated: 21 March 2011
- Reference no.: BTL15
- Battle location in Scotland

The Battle of Pinkie, also known as the Battle of Pinkie Cleugh (/kl(j)ux/), took place on 10 September 1547 on the banks of the River Esk near Musselburgh, Scotland. The last pitched battle between Scotland and England before the Union of the Crowns, it was part of the conflict known as the Rough Wooing. It was a catastrophic defeat for Scotland, where it became known as "Black Saturday". A highly detailed and illustrated English account of the battle and campaign authored by eyewitness William Patten was published in London as propaganda four months after the battle.

== Background ==
During the final years of his reign, King Henry VIII of England tried to secure an alliance with Scotland by the marriage of the infant Mary, Queen of Scots to his young son, the future Edward VI. The Scots rejected the Treaty of Greenwich. When further diplomacy failed, and Scotland was on the verge of an alliance with France, Henry launched a war against Scotland that has become known as the Rough Wooing. Some Scots opposed an alliance that would bring a reformation of their church on English terms, and saw the 1547 campaign as a religious conflict, while the Protestant John Cockburn of Ormiston welcomed an English army. Edward VI wrote "we fight for the cause of God, they for that of the Pope". During the battle, the Scots taunted the English soldiers, calling them "louns" (Doric Scots: loon, lit. 'boy', i.e., "person of no consequence"), "tykes", and "heretics". The Earl of Angus is said to have arrived at the battle with monks, "the professors of the Gospel".

When Henry VIII died in 1547, Edward Seymour, maternal uncle of Edward VI, became Lord Protector. He continued the policy of seeking a forced alliance with Scotland by demanding both the marriage of Mary to Edward and the imposition of an Anglican Reformation on the Scottish Church. Early in September, he led a well-equipped army into Scotland, supported by a large fleet. The Earl of Arran, Scottish regent at the time, was forewarned by letters from Adam Otterburn, his representative in London, who had observed English war preparations. Otterburn may have seen the leather horse armour made by the workshops of Nicholas Bellin of Modena and Hans Hunter.

== Campaign ==
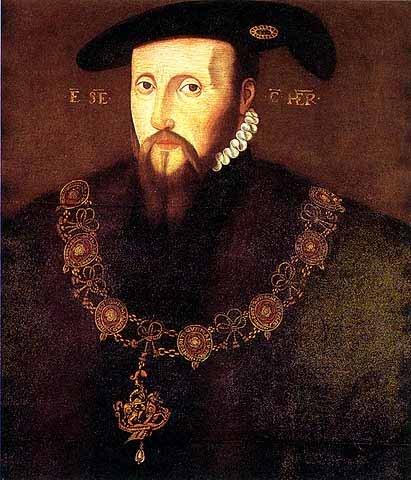
Edward Seymour, 1st Duke of Somerset

Somerset's army was partly composed of the traditional county levies, summoned by Commissions of Array and armed with longbow and bill as they had been at the Battle of Flodden, thirty years before. However, Somerset also had several hundred German mercenary arquebusiers, a large and well-appointed artillery train, and 6,000 cavalry, including a contingent of Spanish and Italian mounted arquebusiers under Pedro de Gamboa The cavalry were commanded by Lord Grey of Wilton, as High Marshal of the Army, and the infantry by the Earl of Warwick, Lord Dacre of Gillesland, and Somerset himself. William Patten, an officer of the English army, recorded its numbers as 16,800 fighting men and 1,400 "pioneers" or labourers.

Somerset advanced along the east coast of Scotland to maintain contact with his fleet and thereby keep in supply. Scottish border reivers harassed his troops but could impose no major check to their advance. The English captured and slighted Innerwick Castle and Thornton Castle. Somerset camped at Longniddry on 7 September.

To the west, a diversionary English invasion of 5,000 men was led by Thomas Wharton and the Scottish dissident Earl of Lennox. On 8 September they took Castlemilk in Annandale and burnt Annan after a bitter struggle to capture its fortified church.

To oppose the English south of Edinburgh, the Earl of Arran had raised a large army, consisting mainly of pikemen with contingents of Highland archers. Arran also had large numbers of guns, but these were apparently not as mobile or as well-served as Somerset's. Arran had his artillery refurbished in August, after the siege of St Andrews Castle, with new gunstocks made from woods of "Aberdagy" and Inverleith. The Lord Treasurer's accounts describe this work as preparation "against the feild of Pynkie Cleuch." Robert Hamilton of Briggis seems to have been in charge of the Scottish guns.

Arran's cavalry consisted of 2,000 lightly equipped riders under the Earl of Home, most of whom were potentially unreliable Borderers. His infantry and pikemen were commanded by the Earl of Angus, the Earl of Huntly and Arran himself. According to Huntly, the Scottish army numbered 22,000 or 23,000 men, while an English source claimed that it comprised 36,000.

Arran occupied the slopes on the west bank of the River Esk to bar Somerset's progress. The Firth of Forth was on his left flank, and a large bog protected his right. Some fortifications were constructed in which cannon and arquebuses were mounted. Some guns pointed out into the Forth to keep English warships at a distance.

== Prelude ==
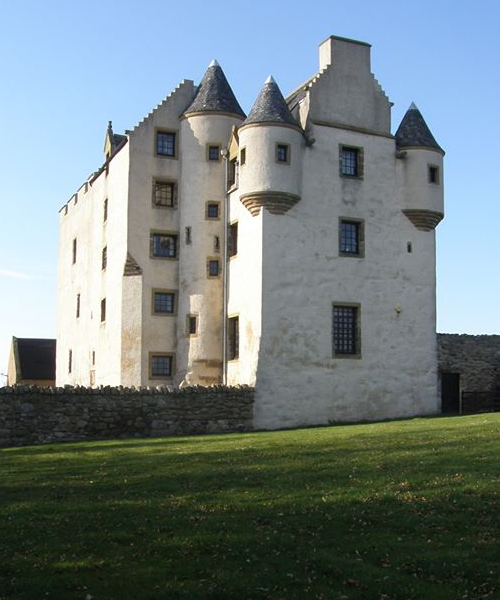
Fa'side Castle, East Lothian

At Monktonhall on 8 September Regent Arran made an act to protect the rights of the children and heirs of those men who would be killed fighting the English. James IV of Scotland had made a similar act at Twizell before Flodden in 1513. On 9 September part of Somerset's army occupied Falside Hill three miles (five kilometres) east of Arran's main position, after Falside Castle put up a slight resistance.

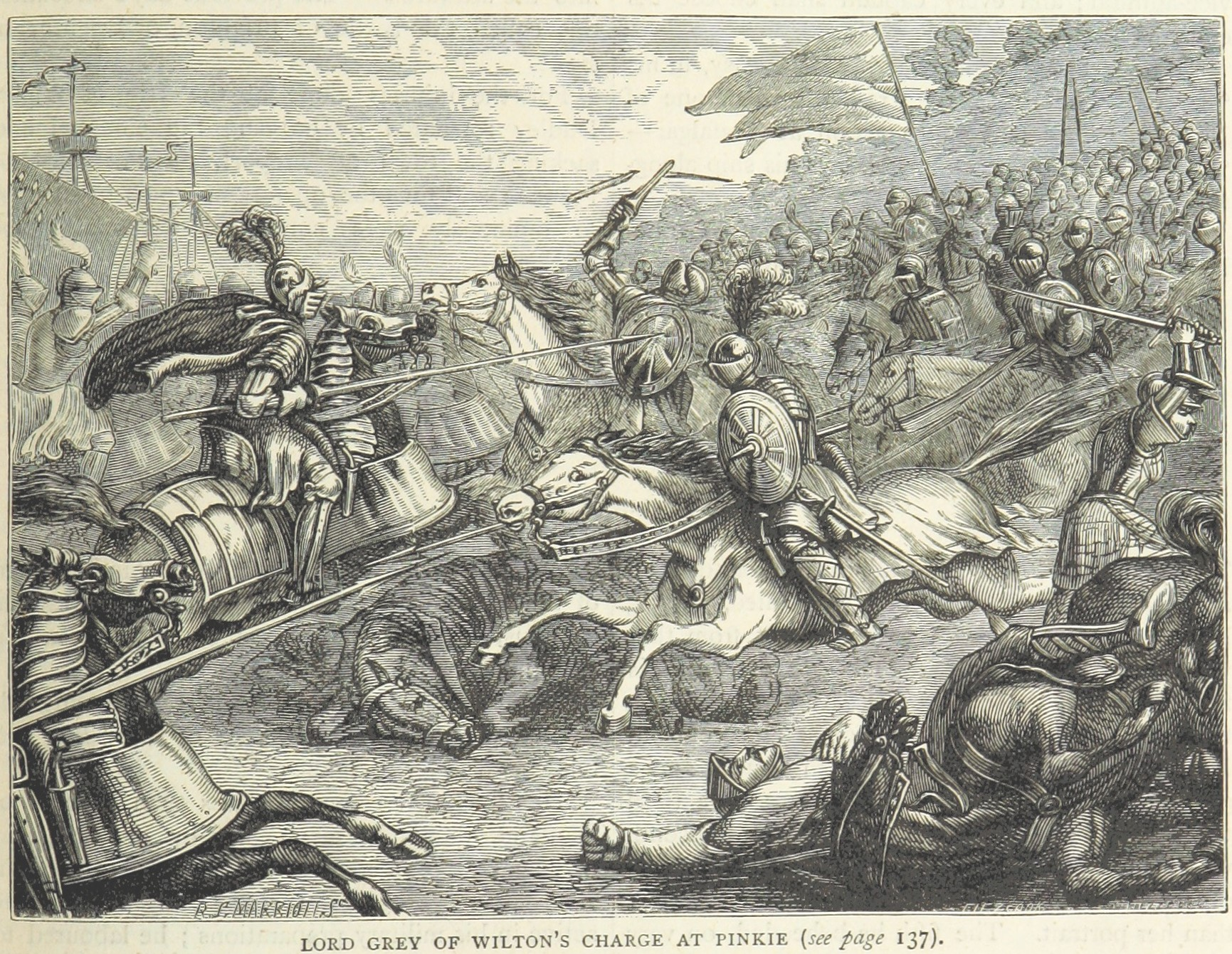
Lord Grey charges the Scottish cavalry

In an outdated chivalric gesture, the Earl of Home led 1,500 horsemen close to the English encampment and challenged an equal number of English cavalry to fight. With Somerset's reluctant approval, Lord Grey accepted the challenge and engaged the Scots with 1,000 heavily armoured men-at-arms and 500 lighter demi-lancers, led by Jacques Granado and others. The Scottish horsemen were badly cut up and were pursued west for 3 mi (5 km). This action cost Arran most of his cavalry. The Scots lost around 800 men in the skirmish. Lord Home was badly wounded, and his sons were taken prisoner.

Later on the same day, Somerset sent a detachment with guns to occupy the Inveresk Slopes, which overlooked the Scottish position. During the night, Somerset received two more antiquated challenges from Arran. One request was for Somerset and Arran to settle the dispute by single combat; another was for 20 champions from each side to decide the matter. Somerset rejected both proposals.

== Battle ==
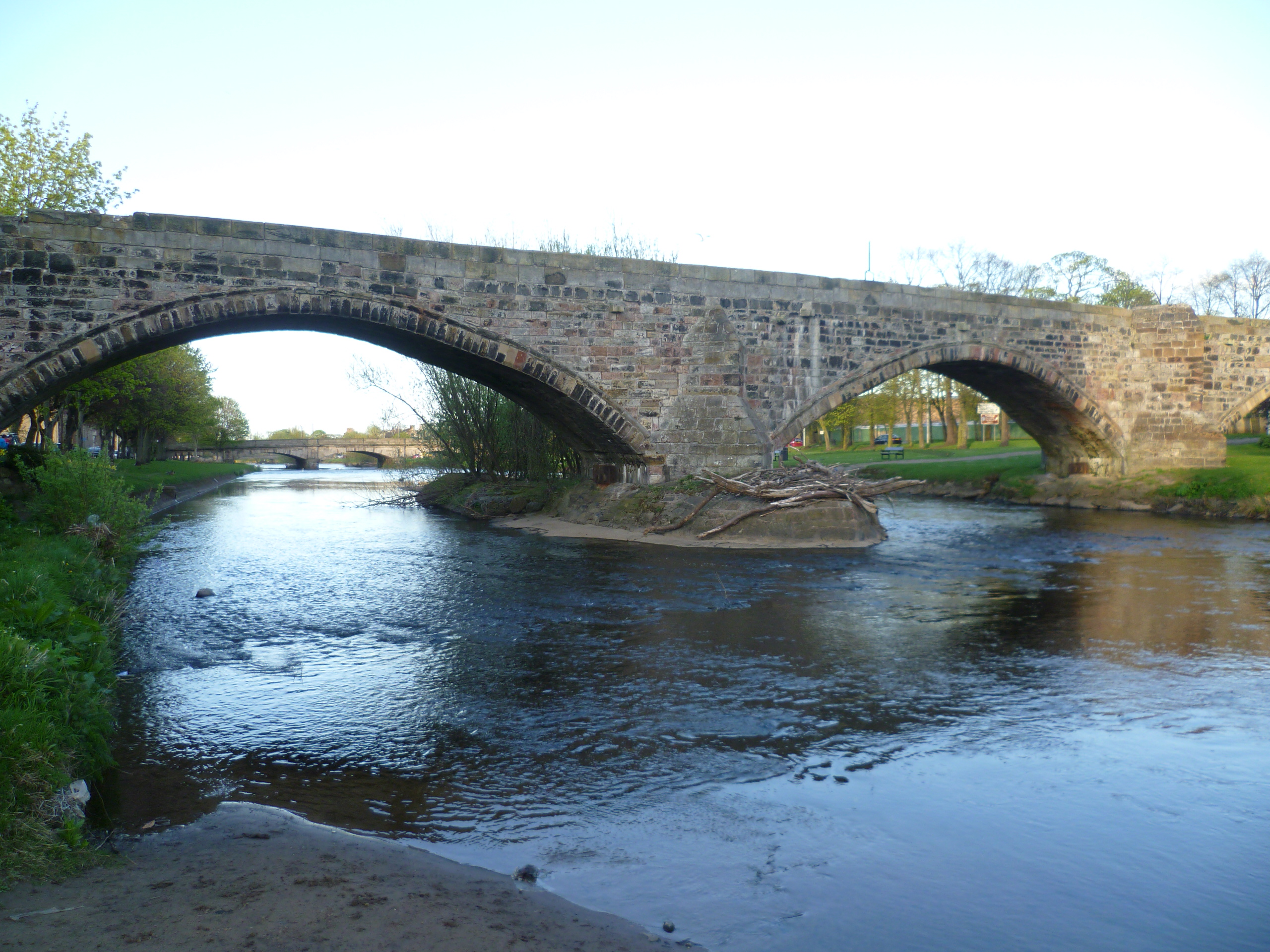
The 16th-century 'Roman Bridge' over the Esk

On the morning of Saturday, 10 September, Somerset advanced his army, seeking to position his artillery at Inveresk. In response Arran moved his army across the Esk by the "Roman bridge", and advanced rapidly to meet him. Arran may have seen movement in the English lines and assumed that the English were trying to retreat to their ships. Arran knew himself to be outmatched in artillery and therefore tried to force close combat before the English artillery could be deployed.

Arran's left wing came under fire from English ships offshore, including the Galley Subtle Their advance meant that the guns at their former position could no longer protect them. They were thrown into disorder and pushed into Arran's own division in the centre.

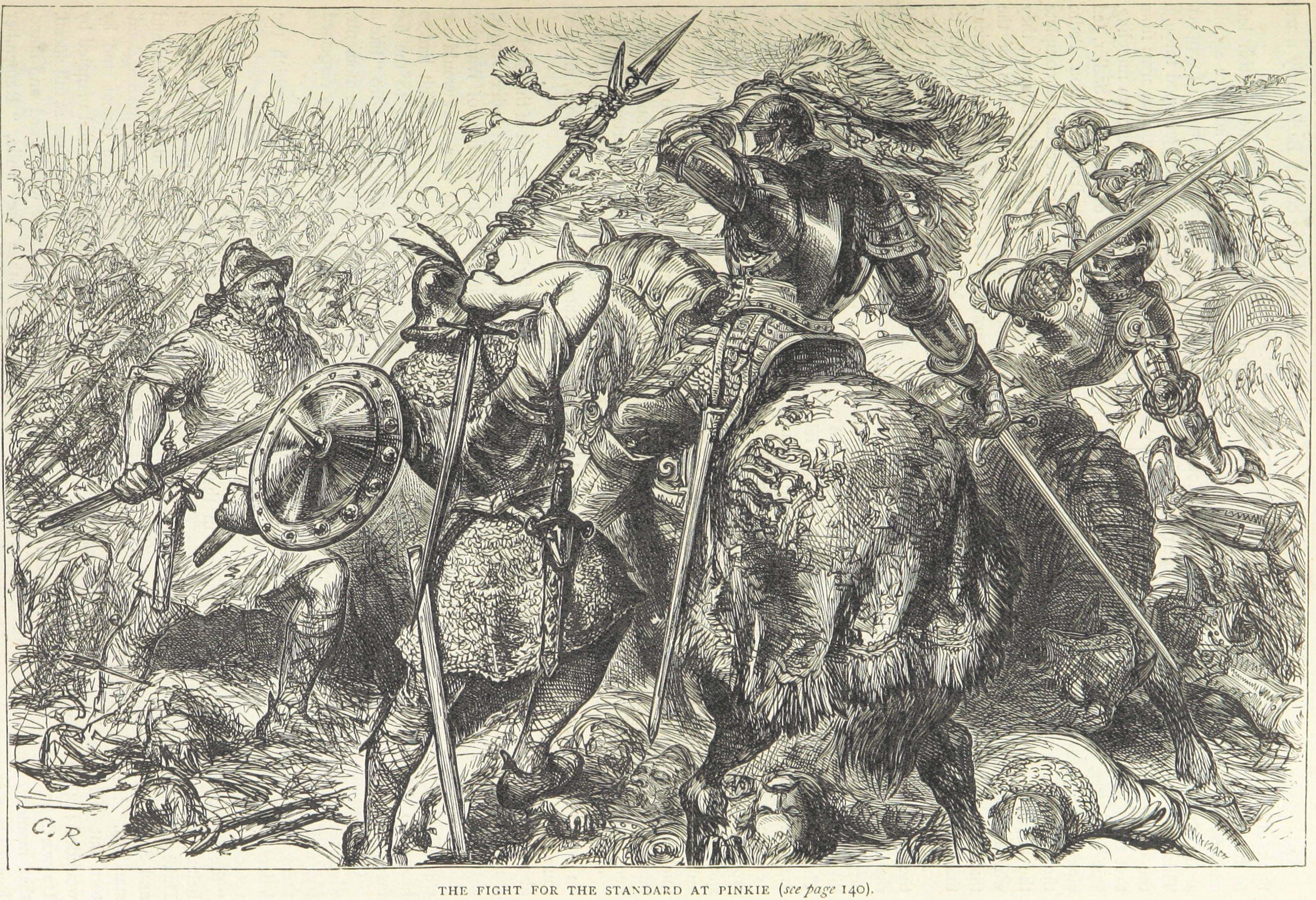
The fight for the standard

On the other flank, Somerset threw in his cavalry to delay the Scots' advance. The English cavalry was at a disadvantage, as they had left their horses' body armour at the camp. The Scottish pikemen drove them off, inflicting heavy casualties. Lord Grey himself was wounded by a pike thrust through his throat and into his mouth. At one point, Scottish pikemen surrounded Sir Andrew Flammack, the bearer of the King's Standard. He was rescued by Sir Ralph Coppinger, and managed to hold onto the standard, despite its staff breaking.

The Scottish army was by now stalled and under heavy fire on three sides, from the ships, land artillery, arquebusiers and archers, to which they had no reply. When they broke, the English cavalry rejoined the battle following a vanguard of 300 experienced soldiers under the command of Sir John Luttrell. Many of the retreating Scots were slaughtered or drowned as they tried to swim the fast-flowing Esk or cross the bogs.

The English eye-witness William Patten described the slaughter inflicted on the Scots;

Soon after this notable strewing of their footmen's weapons, began a pitiful sight of the dead corpses lying dispersed abroad, some their legs off, some but houghed, and left lying half-dead, some thrust quite through the body, others the arms cut off, diverse their necks half asunder, many their heads cloven, of sundry the brains pasht out, some others again their heads quite off, with other many kinds of killing. After that and further in chase, all for the most part killed either in the head or in the neck, for our horsemen could not well reach the lower with their swords. And thus with blood and slaughter of the enemy, this chase was continued five miles [eight kilometres] in length westward from the place of their standing, which was in the fallow fields of Inveresk until Edinburgh Park and well nigh to the gates of the town itself and unto Leith, and in breadth nigh 4 miles [6 kilometres], from the Firth sands up toward Dalkeith southward. In all which space, the dead bodies lay as thick as a man may note cattle grazing in a full replenished pasture. The river ran all red with blood, so that in the same chase were counted, as well by some of our men that somewhat diligently did mark it as by some of them taken prisoners, that very much did lament it, to have been slain about 14 thousand. In all this compass of ground what with weapons, arms, hands, legs, heads, blood and dead bodies, their flight might have been easily tracked to every of their three refuges. And for the smallness of our number and the shortness of the time (which was scant five hours, from one to well nigh six) the mortality was so great, as it was thought, the like aforetime not to have been seen.

=== Imperial ambassador's accounts of the battle ===
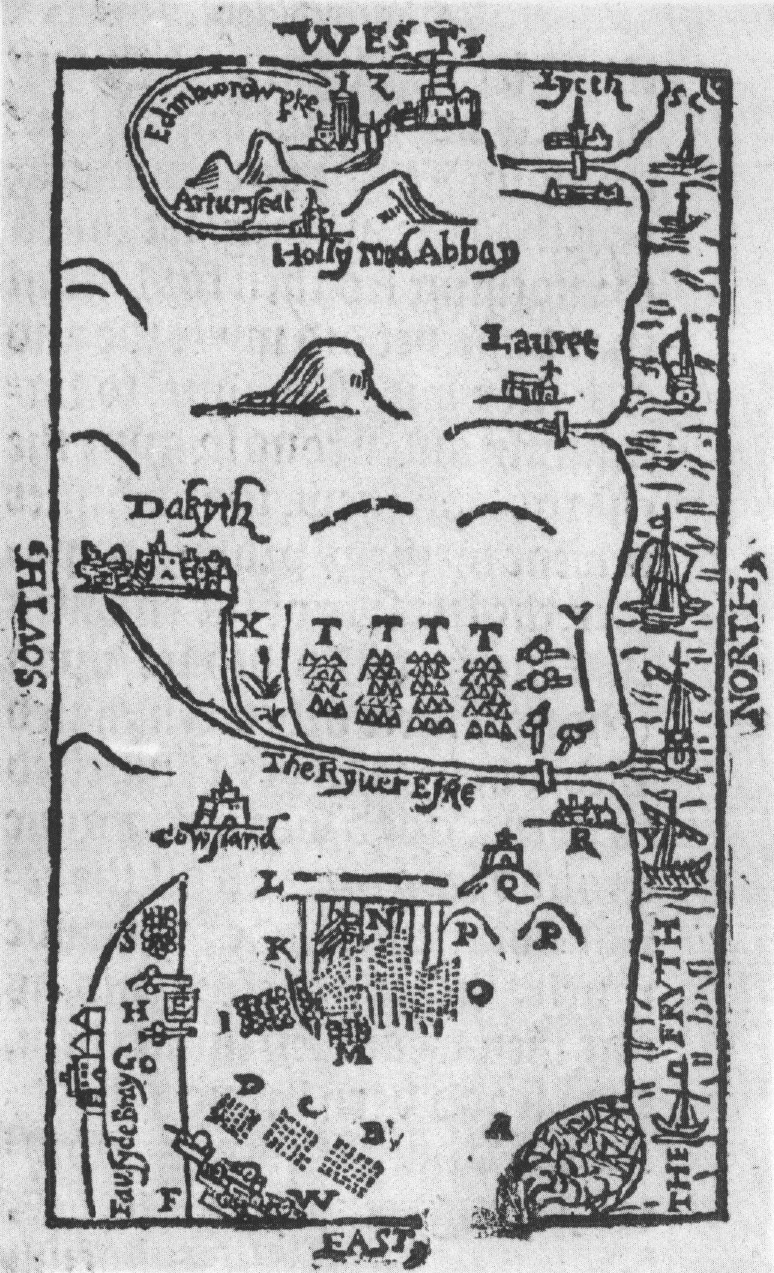
Battle of Pinkie, woodcut illustration from William Patten (1548)

The Imperial ambassador François van der Delft went to the court of King Edward VI at Oatlands Palace to hear the news of the battle from William Paget. Van der Delft wrote to the Queen Dowager, Mary of Hungary, with his version of the news on 19 September. He described the cavalry skirmish on the day before the battle. He had heard that on the day of the battle, when the English army encountered the Scottish formation, the Scots advance horsemen dismounted and crossed their lances, which they used like pikes standing in close formation. Van der Delft was told that the Earl of Warwick then attempted to attack the Scots from behind using smoking fires as a diversion. When they engaged the Scottish rearguard the Scots took flight, apparently following some who already had an understanding with the Protector Somerset. The rest of the Scots army then attempted to flee the field.

Van der Delft wrote a shorter description for Prince Philip on 21 October. In this account he lays emphasis on the Scots attempting to change position. He said the Scots crossed the brook in order to occupy two hills which flanked both armies. The Scottish army, "without any need whatever were seized with panic and began to fly". Another letter with derivative news of the battle was sent by John Hooper in Switzerland to the Reformer Henry Bullinger. Hooper mentions that Scots had to abandon their artillery due to the archers commanded by the Earl of Warwick, and when the Scots changed position the sun was in their eyes. He was told there were 15,000 Scottish casualties and 2,000 prisoners. There were 17,000 English in the field and 30,000 Scots. Hooper's letter is undated but he includes the false early report that Mary of Guise surrendered in person to Somerset after the battle. These newsletters, though compiled and written by non-combatants days after the battle and far from the battlefield, are nevertheless important sources for the historian and for reconstruction of the events, to compare with Patten's narrative and archaeological evidence from the field.

== Aftermath ==
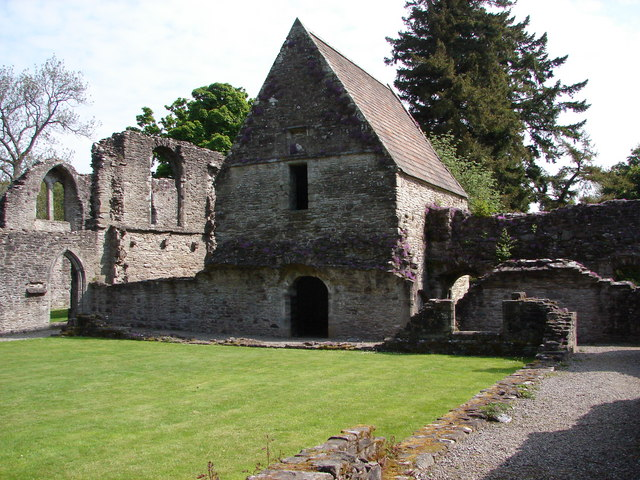
Inchmahome Priory, on an island in the Lake of Menteith, was a safe refuge for the infant Mary during the invasion.

Although they had suffered a resounding defeat, the Scottish government refused to come to terms. The infant Queen Mary was smuggled out of the country to France to be betrothed to the young Dauphin of France, Francis. Somerset occupied several Scottish strongholds and large parts of the Lowlands and Borders but, without peace, these garrisons became a useless drain on the Treasury.

=== Analysis ===
Although the Scots blamed traitors for the defeat, it may be fairer to say that a Renaissance army defeated a medieval army. Henry VIII had taken steps towards creating standing naval and land forces which formed the nucleus of the fleet and army that gave Somerset the victory. However, the military historian Gervase Phillips has defended Scottish tactics, pointing out that Arran moved from his position by the Esk as a rational response to English manoeuvres by sea and land. In his 1877 account of the battle, Major Sadleir Stoney commented that every novice commander "knows that changing front in presence of an enemy is a perilous operation". Early commentators such as John Knox had focused on the move as the cause of the defeat and attributed the order to move to the influence of local landowners George Durie, Abbot of Dunfermline, and Hugh Rig of Carberry. Marcus Merriman sees the initial Scottish field encampment as the most sophisticated ever erected in Scotland, let down by their cavalry numbers.

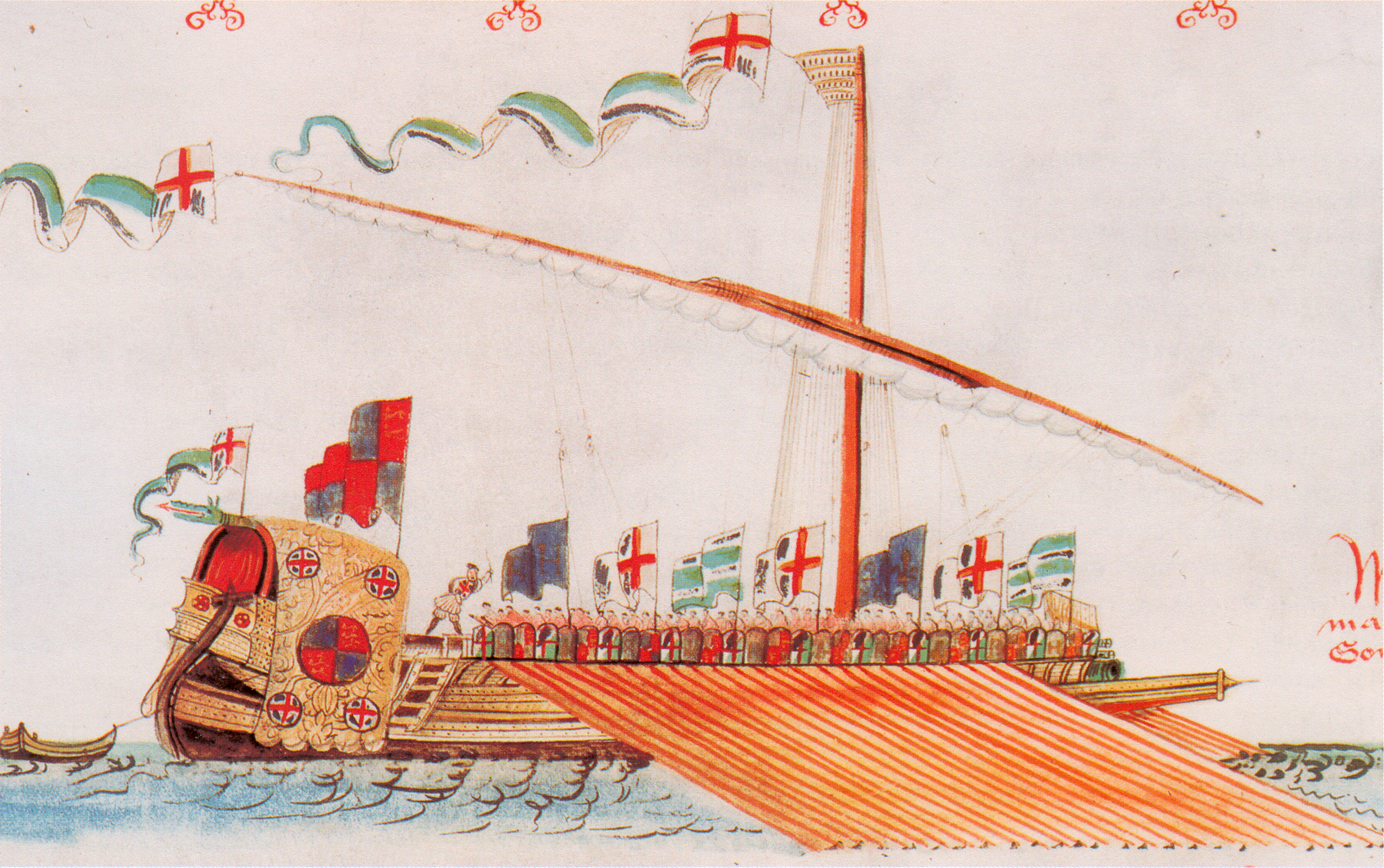
The Galley Subtle bombarded the battlefield (depicted in the Anthony Roll).

Gervase Phillips maintains the defeat may be considered due to a crisis of morale after the English cavalry charge, and notes William Patten's praise of the Earl of Angus's pikemen. Merriman regards Somerset's failure to press on and capture Edinburgh and Leith as a loss of "a magnificent opportunity" and "a massive blunder" which cost him the war. In 1548, the Scottish Master of Artillery, Lord Methven, gave his opinion that the battle was lost due to growing support in Scotland for English policy, and the mis-order and great haste of the Scottish army on the day.

The naval bombardment was an important aspect of the battle. The English navy was commanded by Lord Clinton and comprised 34 warships with 26 support vessels. William Patten mentions the Galley Subtle, captained by Richard Broke, as one of the ships at the battle, and included it in one of his plans, depicted in the woodcut with its oars visible, close to Musselburgh. The guns of the ships in English fleet were recorded in an inventory. The Galley Subtle carried two brass demi-cannons, two brass Flanders demi-culverins, breech-loading iron double basses and single basses. The galleys could be brought near the shore by their rowers. After the battle, Andrew Dudley and Michael Durham sailed to Broughty Castle in the Galley Subtle and fired three shots, effecting its surrender.

=== Scottish artillery ===
Warned of the approach of the English army, the Scottish artillery was made ready at Edinburgh Castle. Extra gunners were recruited and 140 pioneers, i.e. workmen, were employed by Duncan Dundas to move the guns. On 2 September carts were hired to take the guns and the Scottish tents and pavilions towards Musselburgh. There were horses, and oxen were supplied by the Laird of Elphinstone. John Drummond of Milnab, master carpenter of the Scottish ordnance, led the wagon train. There was a newly painted banner, and ahead a boy played on the "swesche", a drum used to alert people.

William Patten described the English officers of the Ordnance after the battle retrieving 30 of the Scottish guns, which were left lying in sundry places, on Sunday 11 September. They found one brass culverin, 3 brass sakers, 9 smaller brass pieces, and 17 other iron guns mounted on carriages. Some of these guns appear in the English royal inventory of 1547–48, at the Tower of London where sixteen Scottish brass guns were recorded. They were a demi-cannon, 2 culverins, 3 sakers, 9 falconets, and a robinet.

=== Account of the English Treasurer General of the Army ===
Ralph Sadler was treasurer for Somerset's expedition in Scotland from 1 August to 20 November 1547. On 22 August, he informed the Earl of Shrewsbury that ships were ready to sail to Aberlady with provisions. The expense of the journey northwards cost £7468-12s–10d, and the return was £6065-14s–4d. Soldiers' wages were £26,299-7s–1d. For his own expenses, Sadler had £211-14s–8d with £258-14s–9d for his equipment and auditor's expenses. A number of special rewards were given to spies, Scottish guides, and others who gave good service, and to the captain of the Spanish mercenaries. The Scottish herald at the battlefield was given 100 shillings. When Sadler's account was audited in December 1547, Sadler was found to owe Edward VI £546-13s–11d which he duly returned.

== Today ==
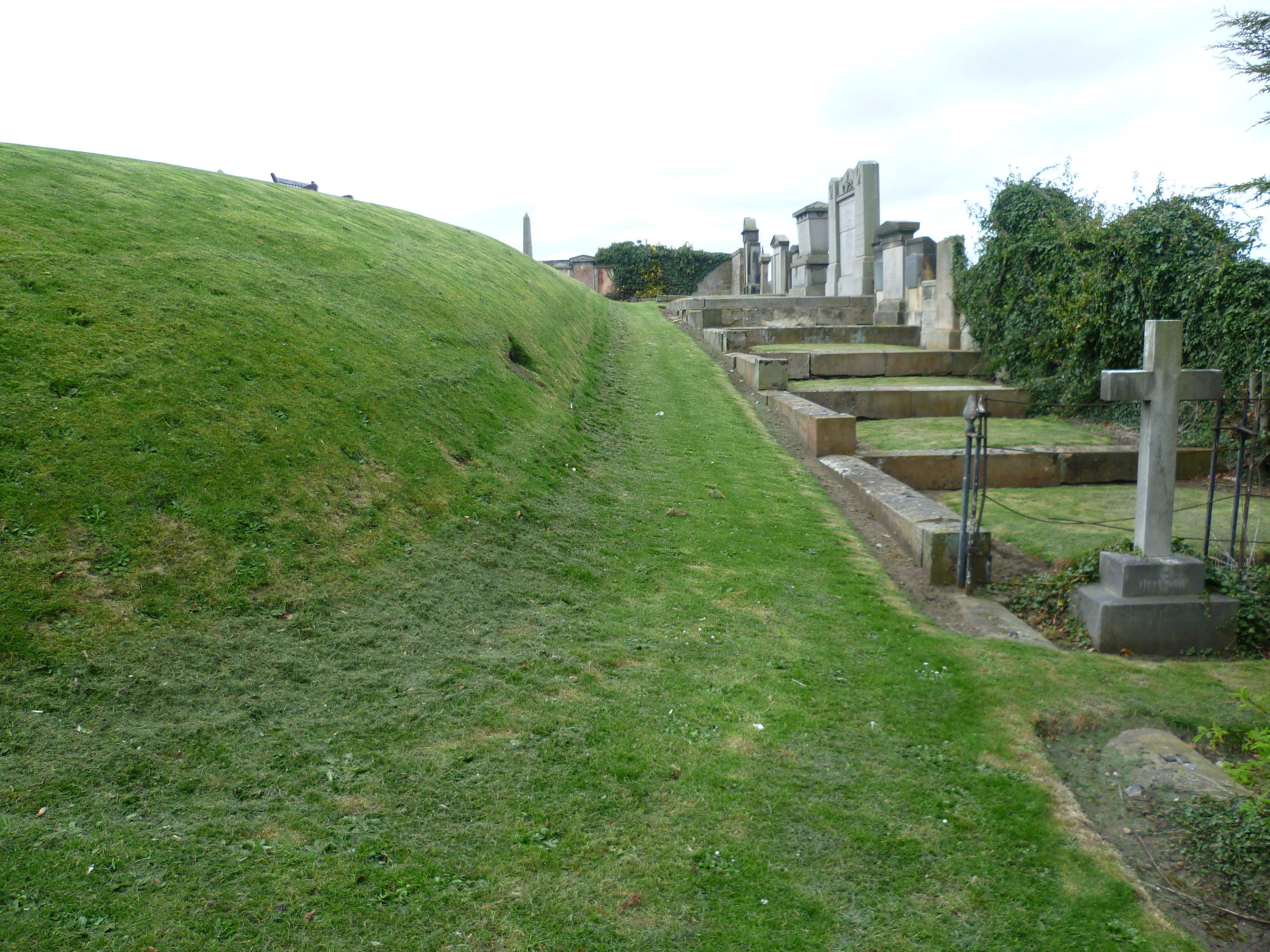
Somerset's Mound, Inveresk Kirkyard

The battle site is now in East Lothian. The battle took place most probably in the cultivated ground 1/2 mi (800 m) south-east of Inveresk Church, just to the south of the main East Coast railway line. There are two vantage points for viewing the ground. Fa'side Castle above the village of Wallyford was just behind the English position, and with the aid of binoculars, a visitor can get a good view of the battle area though the Scottish position is now obscured by buildings. The best impression of their position is obtained from the golf course west of the River Esk and just off the B6415 road. The Scottish centre occupied ground a few yards west of the clubhouse. The Inveresk eminence, an important tactical feature at the time of the battle, is now built over, but from it, a visitor can get down to the Esk and walk for some way along the bank. The walk gives a further idea of a part of the Scottish position, but the town of Musselburgh now completely covers the left of the line. The battlefield was added to the Inventory of Historic Battlefields in Scotland in 2011.

A stone commemorating the battle has been erected southwest of Wallyford village near the junction of Salters Road and the A1 road. The stone is carved with St. Andrew's Cross, the English rose and Scottish thistle and the name and date of the battle. It is situated on the north side of the driveway to the home that is in the northwest corner of the intersection. Co-ordinates: 55.9302992°N 3.0210942°W.

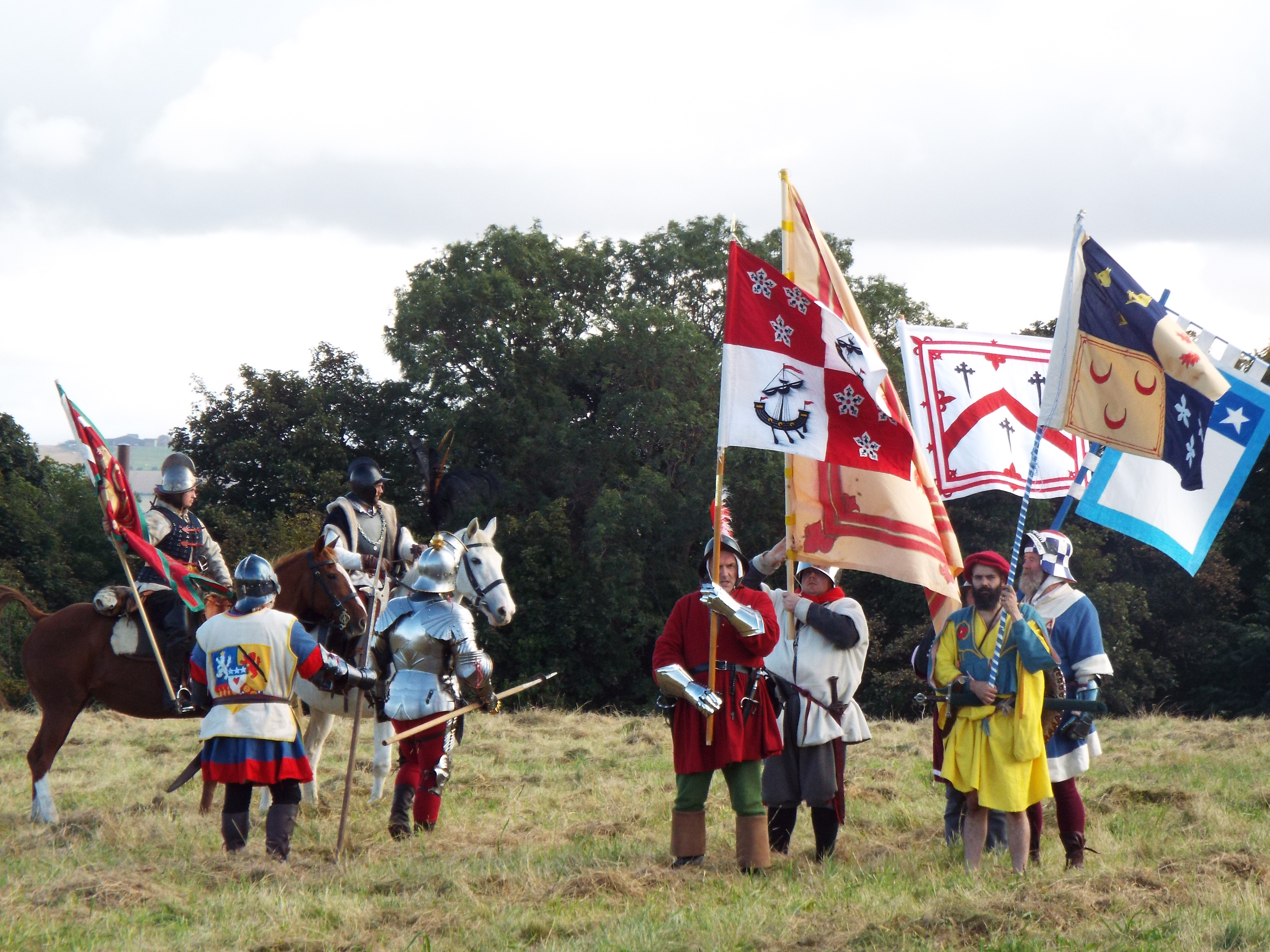
Scottish re-enactors at Pinkie in 2017

In September 2017 the Scottish Battlefields Trust staged the first major re-enactment of the battle in the grounds of Newhailes House. Such re-enactments are intended to continue on a triennial cycle.

A team of volunteer embroiderers, working in conjunction with Dr Andrew Crummy, the designer of the Great Tapestry of Scotland, are working on a series of five commemorative panels. The third complete panel was unveiled in Pinkie House on 10 September 2026, the anniversary of the battle. Work on the final two panels continues.

== Casualties ==
Some of the injured soldiers were treated by Lockhart, a barber surgeon from Dunbar. David H. Caldwell has written, "English estimates put the slaughter as high as 15,000 Scots killed and 2,000 taken but the Earl of Huntly's figure of 6,000 dead is probably nearer the truth." Of the Scottish prisoners, few were nobles or gentlemen. It was claimed that most were dressed much the same as common soldiers and therefore were not recognised as being worth ransoming. Caldwell says of the English casualties, "Officially it was given out that losses were only 200 though the rumour about the English court, fed by private letters from those in the army, indicated that 500 or 600 was more likely."

William Patten names a number of high-ranking casualties. The Englishmen he names were horsemen forced onto Scottish pikes in a ploughed field to the east of the English position, after they had crossed a slough towards the Scottish position on Falside Brae.

=== English ===
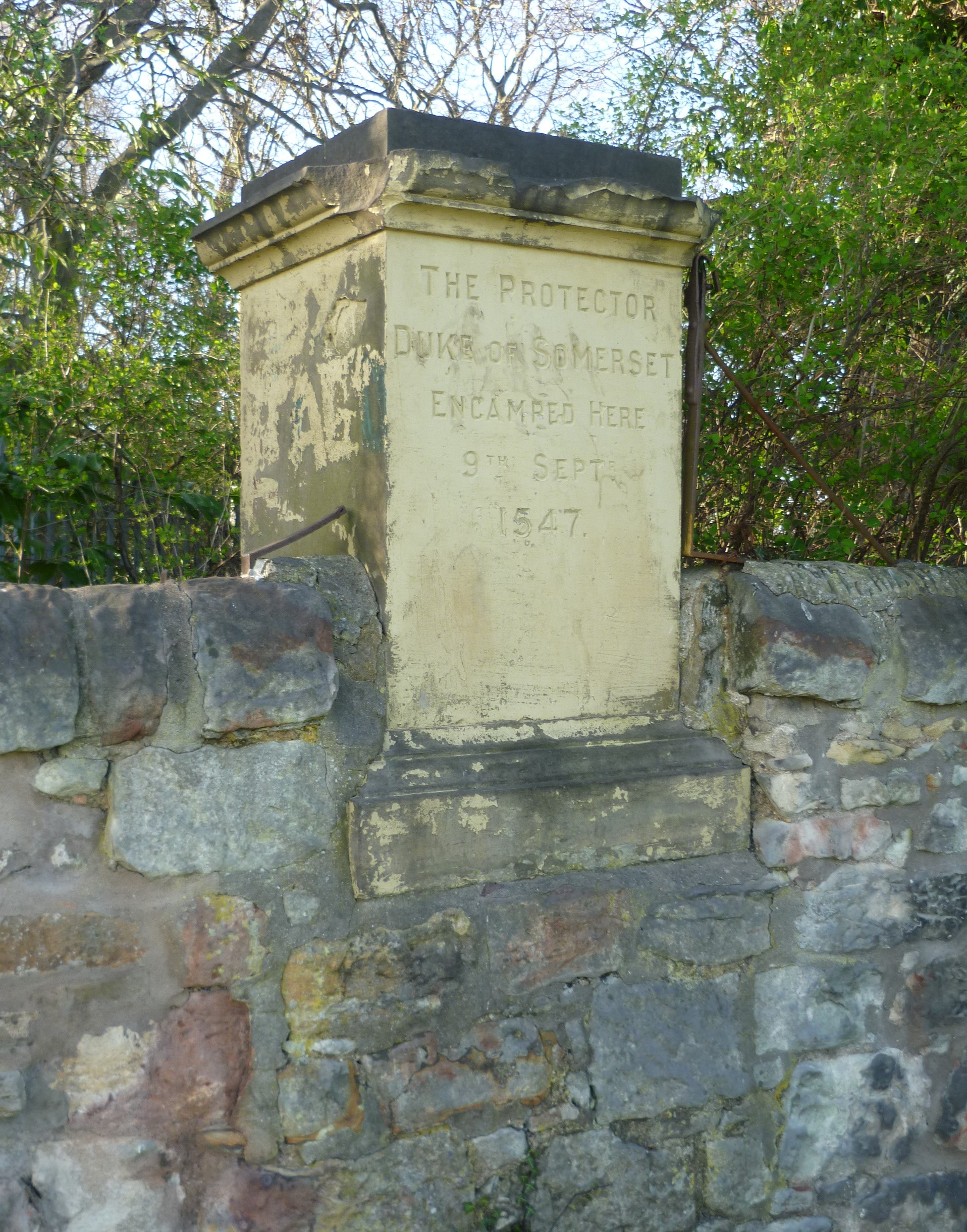
Stone marking the site of the English encampment at Inveresk

- Edward Shelley, subject of a lost portrait by Hans Eworth, fourth son of Sir William Shelley.
- Sir Walter Hawksworth, son of and heir of Thomas of Hawksworth, Yorkshire.
- The Lord Fitzwalter's brother
- Sir John Clere's son, a brother of the poet Thomas Clere (John Clere of Ormesby, Norfolk, was killed in battle at Kirkwall on 21 August 1557).
- Thomas Wodehouse, son of Sir Roger Wodehouse of Kimberley, Norfolk, and Madge Shelton

=== Scottish ===
- Malcolm, Lord Fleming
- Robert, Master of Graham, son and heir of William Graham, 2nd Earl of Montrose, killed in the naval bombardment
- Robert, Master of Erskine, son and heir of John Erskine, 5th Lord Erskine
- James, Master of Ogilvy, son and heir of James Ogilvy, 4th Lord Ogilvy of Airlie.
- The Master of Avondale, son and heir of Andrew Stewart, 1st Lord Avondale
- The Master of Ruthven, son and heir of William Ruthven, 2nd Lord Ruthven
- John Stewart, Master of Buchan, son of John Stewart, 3rd Earl of Buchan
- The Master of Methven, son and heir of Henry Stewart, 1st Lord Methven

The names of a number of other Scottish casualties are known from legal records, cases falling under the act made at Monktonhall, or from Scottish chronicles, and include:

- William Adamson of Craigcrook Castle
- The 6th Laird, Alexander Forbes of Tolquhon
- Andrew Agnew of Lochnaw Leswalt, Wigtownshire
- Gilbert Agnew, Wigtownshire
- James Allardice, who fell under the royal banner
- Andrew Anstruther of that Ilk
- James Blair, Middle Auchindraine
- Thomas Brodie of Brodie
- Alan Cathcart, 3rd Lord Cathcart
- William Cunninghame of Glengarnock
- Gabriel Cunyngham of Craigends
- John Crawfurd of Auchinames
- John Crawford of Giffordland.
- William Dishington of Ardross
- Robert Douglas of Lochleven
- Thomas Dumbreck of that Ilk
- Archibald Dunbar of Baldoon, Kirkinner, Wigtownshire
- Alexander Dundas of Fingask
- Alexander Elphinstone, 2nd Lord Elphinstone
- Finla Mor, Findlay of Clan Farquharson, said to have carried the royal banner
- Henry Fithie, younger of Boysack
- David Forrester of Garden and Torwood
- James Forrester of Corstorphine
- James Gordon of Lochinvar
- John Gordon of Pitlurg.
- David Hamilton of Broomhill, son-in-law of Robert, Lord Semple
- Cuthbert Hamilton of Canir, brother-in-law of David Hamilton of Broomhill
- George Henderson of Fordell, and his oldest son William
- George Home of Wedderburn.
- Kentigern or Mungo Huntar of Hunterston.
- James Innes of Cromy
- Alexander Irvine, Master of Drum.
- William Johnston, younger of Caskieben
- Thomas Kennedy, Vicar of Penpont, a son of Gilbert Kennedy, 2nd Earl of Cassilis
- Alexnder Kinninmonth.
- Alexander Lauder of Hatton.
- James Learmonth of Dairsie and Balcomie
- John Leckie of Leckie, Dumbartonshire
- John, Master of Livingston, son of Alexander Livingston, 5th Lord Livingston
- William Lumsden of Airdrie, Fife.
- Thomas MacCulloch of Plaids
- John MacDowall of Garthland
- John MacDowall of Corswall, Kirkcolm, Wigtownshire
- Fergus McDouall of Freugh, Stoneykirk, Wigtownshire
- Richard Melville, father of Andrew Melville
- James Montfode of Montfode
- Hugh Montgomerie, a son of the Earl of Eglinton
- Kentigern Muir of Rowallan.
- Robert Munro, 14th Baron of Foulis.
- Alexander Napier of Merchiston
- Hew Ralston of that llk
- James Skene of Wester Corse, father of Gilbert Skene
- John Vans of Barnbarroch, Kirkinner, Wigtownshire.

== Bibliography ==
=== Primary sources ===
- William Patten, The Late Expedition into Scotland (1548), in A. E. Pollard, Tudor Tracts (London, 1903), pp. 53–157.
- Joseph Bain, Calendar of State Papers, Scotland, vol. 1 (Edinburgh, 1898).
- Teulet, Alexandre (1862). Relations politiques de la France et de l'Espagne avec l'Écosse au XVIe siècle, vol. 1. Paris: Société de l'Histoire de France.
- Teulet, A., ed., Relations politiques de la France et de l'Espagne avec l'Écosse au XVIe siècle, vol. 1 (1862) pp. 124–158, Latin account following William Patten.
- Arthur Clifford, Sadler State Papers, vol. 2 (Edinburgh (1809) pp. 353–364, the English army treasurer's account.
- David Constable, Jean de Berteville's Récit de l'expédition en Ecosse l'an 1546 et de la battayle de Muscleburgh (Bannatyne Club: Edinburgh, 1825), a French eyewitness fighting on English side.
- Philip de Malpas Grey Egerton, A commentary of the services and charges of William Lord Grey of Wilton, by his son Arthur Grey, Camden Society (1847).

=== Secondary sources ===
- Phillips, Gervase, 'In the Shadow of Flodden: Tactics, Technology and Scottish Military Effectiveness, 1513–1550', Scottish Historical Review, vol.b77, no. 204 part 2, EUP (Oct. 1998), pp. 162–182.
- F. Sadlier Stoney, Life and Times of Ralph Sadleir (Longman: London. 1877) pp. 107–114.
- Warner, Philip (1996). Famous Scottish Battles. Barnsley, South Yorkshire: Leo Cooper. ISBN 0-85052-487-3.
- "News Item: Magnificent Pinkie Cleugh commemoration and re-enactments delight thousands". www.battleofprestonpans1745.org..
- Alex Hodgson, an East Lothian born folk singer/songwriter pays tribute to the battle of Pinkie Cleugh through the song Doon Pinkie Cleugh on his second album 'The Brig Tae Nae Where', published on Scottish folk record label Greentrax Recordings.
