= Elphinstone Tower (East Lothian) =

Coordinates: 55°55′2.5″N 2°58′37″W

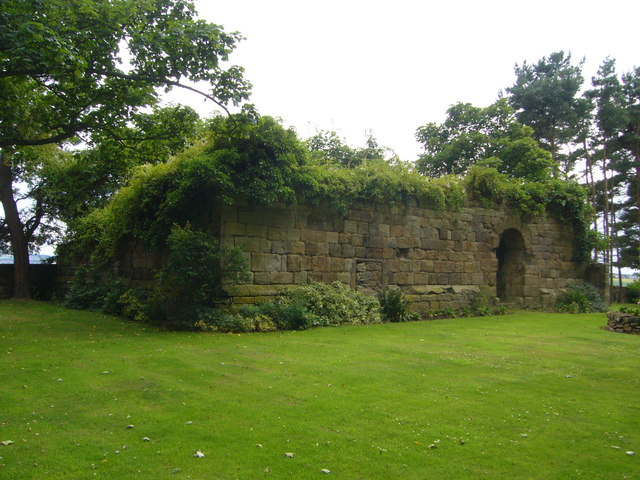
Remains of Elphinstone Tower

Elphinstone Tower is a ruined 13th–15th century keep, about 4 miles (6.4 km) southeast of Tranent, East Lothian, Scotland, and 0.5 miles (0.8 km) west of the village of Elphinstone, East Lothian.

== History ==
The Elphinstone family owned the lands from the 13th century. The tower was commenced in the 13th century, but not finished until the 15th century. Soon after Sir Alexander Elphinstone was killed in 1435, it seems that the property passed to the Johnstones by marriage. This was the place where the Protestant reformer George Wishart was brought from Ormiston to be handed over to Cardinal Beaton; he from thence taken to St Andrews for trial and execution by burning.

James Johnstone, laird of Elphinstone was involved in the murder of David Rizzio at Holyrood Palace in March 1566. A mansion adjoining the castle was built in 1600, but demolished in 1865. Because of subsidence from coal workings, much of the tower was demolished in 1955, and there has been further loss since then.

== Structure ==
Elphinstone Tower formerly had three storeys, and a stone-flagged parapet. It had a vaulted basement. The first floor comprised the hall and the original kitchen, screened by a partition. There were private chambers in the upper floors. There were many rooms and stairs in the thickness of the wall. A peephole allowed the hall to be watched in secret. By 1975, the north wall, with one doorway intact, remains to a height of 4 metres (13 ft) but the south wall had completely disappeared.

== See also ==
- Castles in Great Britain and Ireland
- List of castles in Scotland
