= Ross High School, Tranent =

Coordinates: 55.9431°N 2.9549°W

Ross High
- School Logo

Location
- Well Wynd; Tranent; Lothian; East Lothian, EH33 2EQ; Scotland

Information
- Type: State Comprehensive
- Motto: Ad Meliora
- Established: 1954
- School district: East Lothian
- Authority: East Lothian Council
- Head teacher: Paul Reynolds
- Staff: 100 (Full Time Teaching)
- Grades: S1 – S6
- Age range: 11–18
- Enrolment: 1,259 (2021)
- Houses: Winton Seton Fa'side
- Colour
- Slogan: Excellence for Everyone
- Feeder schools: Sanderson's Wynd, Windygoul, St Martins, Macmerry, Ormiston, Pencaitland, Elphinstone, Saulton and Humbie
- Website: rosshigh.co.uk

Ross High School is a large secondary school in Tranent, East Lothian. As of April 2021, the school roll was 1,259 (2021) making it the largest secondary school in East Lothian by pupil roll. The school was founded in 1954 and named after George Ross, who was convener of the local council at the time. The current head teacher is Paul Reynolds. In 2022 construction of an extension was completed allowing for new ICT, modern languages and art classrooms.

== History ==
Before Ross High School was established, students from Tranent and surrounding areas attended Preston Lodge High School in Prestonpans. Until 1954 when a major effort to provide a 6-year school for Tranent and surrounding villages. The name Ross High recognises the support of the convenor of East Lothian Council at the time George Ross. The original building was built in 1954 and partially still stands. A Public Private Partnership (PPP) refurbishment began in January 2003 and after various delays, was finished in 2005. Another £1.9 million extension was completed in 2007 which added five new classrooms and other facilities. In 2018 it was announced that £8.83 million would be spent between 2019 and 2021 in extending the school further to accommodate the growing population of Tranent and the surrounding areas and to ensure that the school has "the space and facilities to continue to deliver a high quality of learning and teaching".

== Staff ==
Paul Reynolds is the head teacher, since August 2013. The depute heads are Ann Archer, Katrina Donaldson, Chris Laud and Jillian Binnie. The business manager is Paula O'Neill.

== Houses ==
The school currently has three houses these are:

- Winton
- Seton
- Fa'side

The three houses are named after three nearby castles Winton Castle, Seton Castle and Fa'side Castle. Historically the school also had four Houses, the fourth being Bankton named after Bankton House however this house was completely phased out by August 2013.

== Standards ==
The school was last inspected by Her Majesty's Inspectorate of Education in March 2011. Strengths were noted as "The enthusiastic involvement of all staff in taking forward improvements to support the learning of all young people, the range of approaches to support and help young people achieve, [and] partnership working, including partnerships to support young people with additional support needs." Agreed areas for improvement were: "Continue to develop a coherent curriculum which provides appropriate progression for all young people. Ensure learning experiences consistently provide appropriate levels of support and challenge."

As of November 2017, the school is listed as having achieved a Unicef Level 2 Rights Respecting Schools Award.

== Notable alumni ==
- George McNeill, sprinter
- Kirsty McBride, footballer
- Willie Young – footballer (Aberdeen, Tottenham Hotspur and Scotland)
- Drew McMaster – sprinter
- Neil Martin – footballer (Hibernian, Sunderland, Coventry City and Scotland)
- Ian Black, footballer
- Declan Glass, footballer
- Leeroy Makovora, footballer
- Sean Mackie, footballer
