= Massacre of Tranent =

1797 violence in Haddingtonshire, Scotland

Coordinates: 55°56′14″N 2°57′16″W

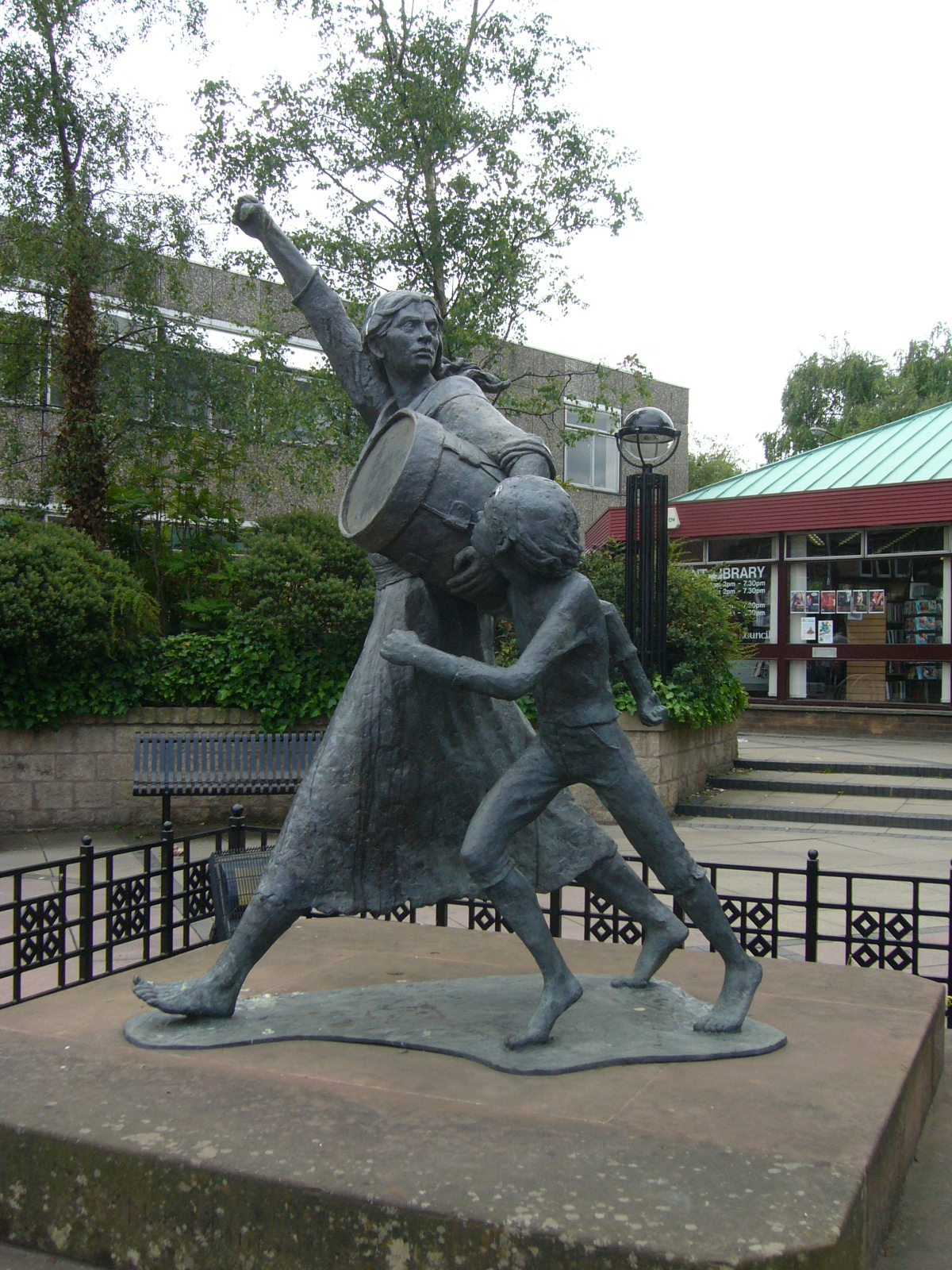
- A memorial in Tranent commemorating Jackie Crookstone

- Location: Tranent, Scotland
- Date: Tuesday, 29 August 1797
- Target: Anti-conscription protesters
- Perpetrator: Cinque Ports Light Dragoons

The Massacre of Tranent was an event which took place on 29 August 1797 in the town of Tranent, Scotland.

== Proclamation ==
On 28 August 1797, a proclamation was drawn up by local residents in Tranent to object to the Scottish Militia Act 1797, which introduced conscription in Scotland to bolster the ranks of the militia by 6,000 men. The proclamation comprised four clauses:

1. We declare that we unanimously disapprove of the late Act of Parliament for raising 6000 militiamen in Scotland.
2. We declare that we will assist each other in endeavouring to repeal the said Act.
3. We declare that we are peaceably disposed; and should you, in endeavouring to execute the said Act, urge us to adopt coercive measures, we must look upon you to be the aggressors, and as responsible to the nation for all the consequences that may follow.
4. Although we may be overpowered in effecting the said resolution, and dragged from our parents, friends, and employment, to be made soldiers of, you can infer from this what trust can be reposed in us if ever we are called upon to disperse our fellow-countrymen, or to oppose a foreign foe.

=== Encouragement ===
This measure may have been encouraged or incited by the United Scotsmen, a secret society spread throughout Scotland who were believed to be intent on insurgence and the setting up of a Scottish government under Muir of Huntershill. It is believed they had been involved in similar protests elsewhere over the Militia Act 1797.

== Day of the incident ==
The following day, 29 August, the proclamation was handed to Major Wight, the commanding officer of the recruitment squad; it was initially ignored. Later, when a contingent from the local colliery communities, led by 'Jackie' (Joan) Crookston confronted the troops, their response was swift and bloody. Several of the protesters, including Crookston, were shot dead out of hand.

The protesters fled from the centre of the small town into the countryside, pursued by the Cinque Port Light Dragoons, who are reported to have cut down people indiscriminately, caring little whether they were involved in the protest or not. Casualty estimates range from around a dozen to twenty or more men, women and children dead, with more injured.

After the slaughter the troopers are alleged to have carried out rapes and pillage in the small town.

== Reactions ==
The Light Dragoons' overall commanding officer was then Colonel Viscount Hawkesbury, (later 2nd Earl of Liverpool and a future Prime Minister) who was not present. It was reported that "His lordship was blamed for remaining at Haddington, as his presence might have prevented the outrages of the soldiery."

== Memorial ==
A statue by sculptor David Annand, of Jackie Crookston and one of the children, was unveiled in Tranent centre in 1995.

== See also ==
- Antimilitarism
- Conscientious objector
- Draft evasion
- War resister
