= Ross High School =

Ross High School may refer to:

- Ross High School (Crowley, Louisiana), in Crowley, Louisiana
- Ross High School (Hamilton, Ohio)
- Ross High School, Tranent, Scotland
- Fremont Ross High School, Fremont, Ohio
- The Ross Building section of Brentwood High School (Brentwood, New York)
