= Ross High RFC =

Scottish rugby union club, based in Tranent, East Lothian

(Scotland) Ross High RFC
- Full name: Ross High Rugby Football Club
- Founded: 1970; 56 years ago
- Location: Tranent, Scotland
- Ground: Ross High School ground
- League: East Division One
- 24/25: 6th
Team kit

Official website
- www.rosshighrfc.com

Ross High RFC is a rugby union club based in Tranent, Scotland. The Men's team currently plays in East Division One.

== History ==
The club was founded in 1970. The club, as its name suggests, grew out of the desire of the former pupils of Ross High School in Tranent to form a rugby union club. The first President of the club Bill Monteith was headmaster of the High School.

The club's longest serving president was Scott Glynn, who was given a MBE for his charity work. Glynn died on 1 January 2020.

A book was released Mon the Ross detailing the history of the club.

Ross High RFC has a long-standing partnership with Welsh rugby union club Markham RFC near Caerphilly.

== Sides ==
The club runs senior and under 18s training on Tuesday and Thursday nights from 7pm to 8.30pm. It is noted as for 'boys and girls from 8 to 80'.

== Honours ==
=== Men's ===
- Holy Cross Sevens
  - Champions (1): 1993
- Broughton Sevens
  - Champions (1): 2006
- North Berwick Sevens
  - Champions (2): 1995, 1996
- Lenzie Sevens
  - Champions: 1996
- East regional league division 3
  - Champions: 2014/15
