= Statue of Robert Baden-Powell, Poole =

Statue in Poole, Dorset

Statue of Robert Baden-Powell
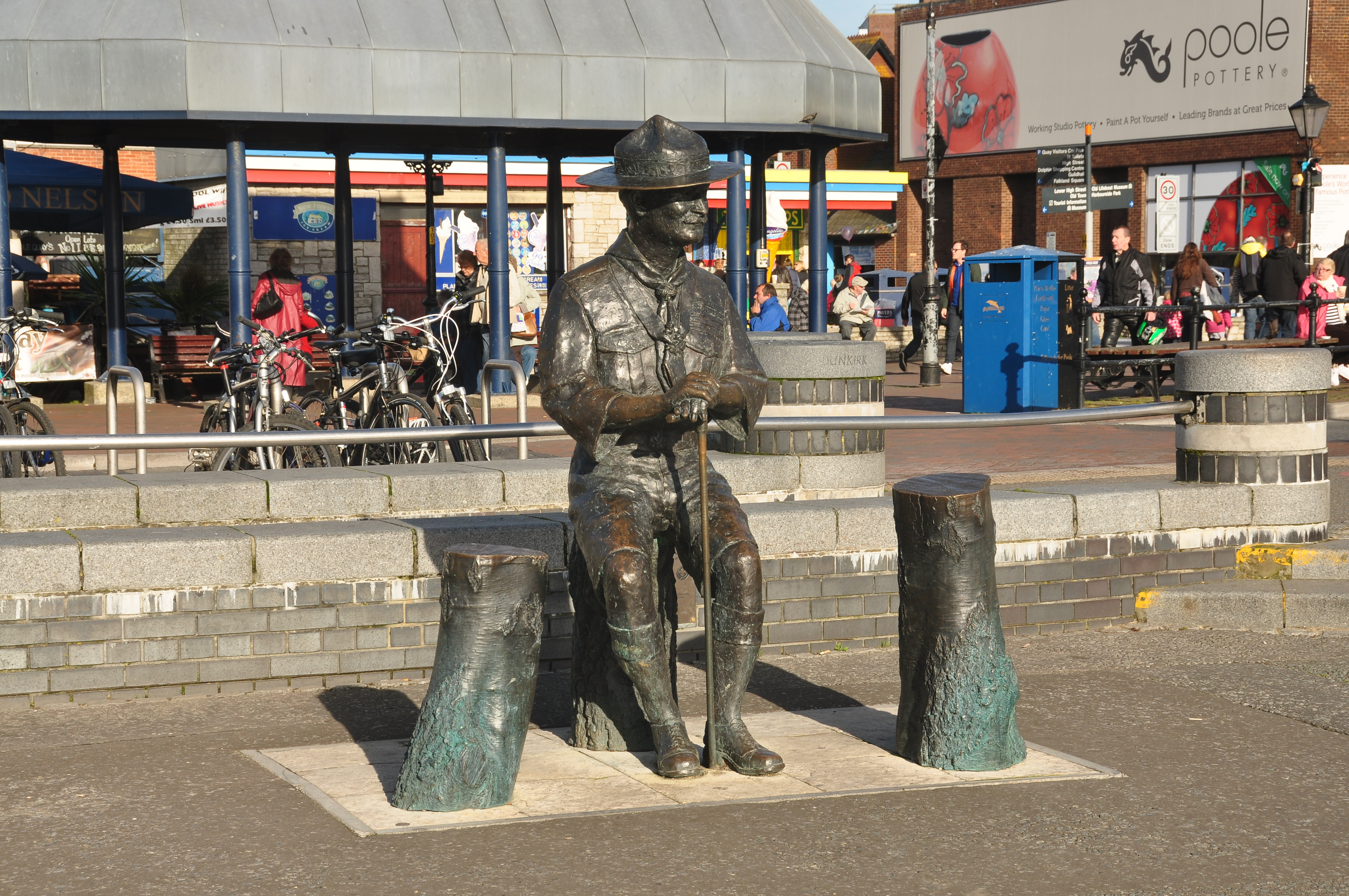
- The statue in 2012
- Artist: David Annand
- Year: 2008
- Medium: Bronze sculpture
- Subject: Robert Baden-Powell, 1st Baron Baden-Powell
- Location: Poole, United Kingdom; 50.71195°N 1.98592°W

A statue of Robert Baden-Powell, founder of Scouting, is installed on the Quay in Poole harbour, Dorset on the south coast of England. The statue, erected in 2008, is a life-size bronze of Robert Baden-Powell by sculptor David Annand. It portrays Baden-Powell in his scout uniform, seated on a log as if for a campfire, with a pair of log seats either side which "allow easy access for photo opportunities".

== History ==
The memorial was unveiled on 13 August 2008, facing Brownsea Island. The island was the site of Baden-Powell's first camp in 1907 which is seen as the start of the Scout and Guide movement.

In June 2020, the memorial appeared on a list of targets by protesters associated with the George Floyd protests in Britain. Bournemouth, Christchurch and Poole Council planned to move it into storage pending discussion about its future, but following a failed attempt by council workers failed to remove the statue on 11 June, a group of local people then surrounded the statue to prevent its removal and protect its removal. The council announced that it would arrange 24 hour security for the statue until either the statue had been removed or the threat had passed. On 12 June the statue was boarded up by the council for its protection., however on 8 July the boarding was removed.

== See also ==
- Actions against memorials in the United Kingdom during the George Floyd protests
