= David Annand =

Scottish sculptor

David Annand MRSS (born 1948) is a Scottish sculptor.

== Education ==
Annand studied at the Duncan of Jordanstone College of Art in the city of Dundee. He taught in secondary schools for fourteen years.

== Art ==
Annand lives and works in Kilmany in the Scottish county of Fife. He is a member of the Royal British Society of Sculptors. He began working as a full-time sculptor in 1988. His work can be found in cities across England, Scotland, Wales, and Northern Ireland. Many of his works relate to local history or literature and are placed in public spaces.

In 2009, Nobel Laureate Seamus Heaney unveiled Annand's sculpture The Turf Man in the village of Bellaghy, County Londonderry. The sculpture was inspired by Heaney's poem Digging, from the collection Death of a Naturalist (1966).

Annand was commissioned by the County Council in conjunction with the NRA in Ireland to create a sculpture to celebrate Patrick Kavanagh's poem Dancing with Kitty Stobling. The sculpture is visible on the Carrickmacross bypass section of the N2 road.

In 2010, he won a commission to create a £100,000 tribute to Cardinal Thomas Wolsey, one of Suffolk's most influential historical figures. The completed work was placed close to Curson House on St Peter's Street in Ipswich.

== Competitions won ==
- 1987 – Sir Otto Beit Medal – Royal Society of British Sculptors for 'Deer Leap'
- 1989 – Winner of the Peth High Street Sculpture Competition Perth Partnership
- 1989 – Winner Almswall Road Sculpture Competition Irvine Development Corporation
- 1995 – Winner of the competition to design a sculpture for the Ashworth Roundabout
- 1995 – Winner of the competition to design a sculpture for Lord Street, Wreham
- 1996 – Winner Strathcarron Hospice composition unveiled by Princess Anne
- 1997 – Winner Birley Street Blackpool Public Sculpture Competition
- 1998 – Winner of public art commission in Basingstoke
- 1998 – Winner of public art commission of Nokia in Franborough
- 1998 – Winner of public art commission in Fraserburgh
- 1998 – Winner Dunbar Swimming Pool Sculpture competition
- 1999 – Winner of the Maidstone commission of Whatmans Field DNA arbour of double helices
- 2000 – Winner of the Bache Roundabout commission Chester
- 2002 – Winner of the project to create a memorial to the poet Robert Fergusson.

== Collection of works ==
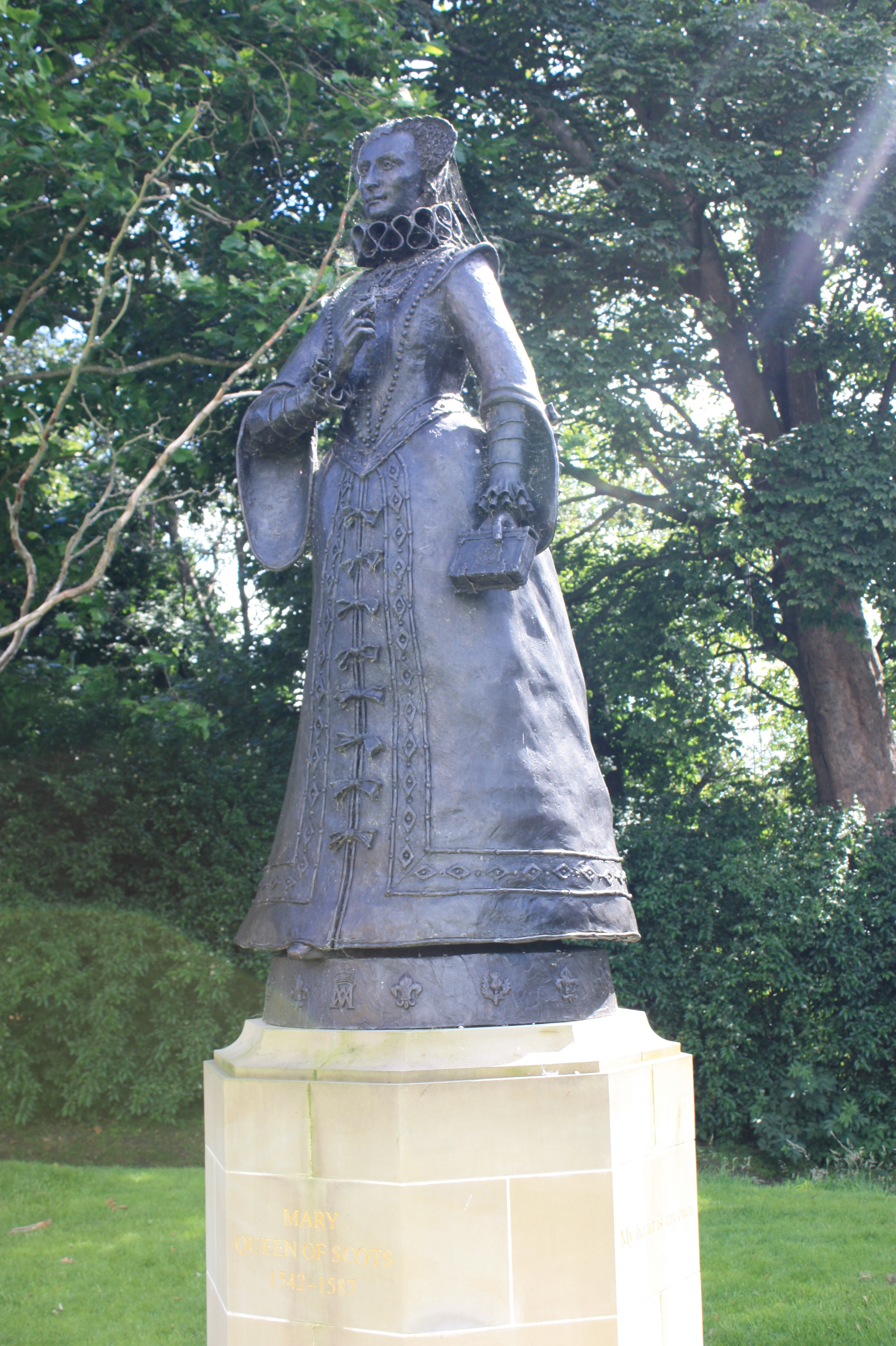
Statue of Mary Queen of Scots at Linlithgow Palace, by David Annand

- 1987/88 Deer Leap, Dundee Technology Park in Dundee (Scotland)
- 1989 Nae Day Sae Dark, High Street Perth in Perth and Kinross (Scotland)
- 1995 Y Bwa (The Arc), Wrexham in Wrexham (county borough) (Wales)
- 1995 Jackie Crookston and children, Tranent in East Lothian (Scotland)
- 1995 Helter Skelter, Blackpool in Lancashire (England)
- 1997 Miner, Kelty in Fife (Scotland)
- 1997 Three cranes in flight, British High Commissioner in Hong Kong (China)
- Arc 1998, Basingstoke in Hampshire (England), Alençon (France) and Liège (Belgium)
- 1998 Willie Spears King Fisher, Eyemouth in Berwickshire (Scotland)
- 2000 Midsummer Watch Jugglers, Chester in Cheshire (England)
- 2001 The Declaration of Arbroath, Dundee (Scotland)
- 2001 DNA Maidstone, Maidstone in Kent (England)
- 2001 Civic Aide, Five Ways Corner in Hendon, London-Barnet
- 2001 Receptor, British Telecom Brentwood in Essex (England)
- 2003 Release Every Pattern, Staines in Surrey (England)
- 2004 Statue Robert Fergusson (Scottish poet 1750–1774), Canongate Kirk in Edinburgh
- 2005 The Writers (Omega), Renfrew in Renfrewshire (Scotland)
- 2005 The Value of Perspective, Exeter in Devon (England)
- 2006 The Knot, Hoylake, Wirral (England)
- 2008 Robert Baden Powell, Poole, Dorset (England)
- 2008 Cornish Miner Statue, Redruth in Cornwall (England)
- 2009 The Turf Man, Bellaghy in County Londonderry (Northern Ireland)
- 2014 Hamish McHamish "Town Cat of St Andrews", Church Square in St Andrews (Scotland)
- 2015 Mary, Queen of Scots, Linlithgow Palace
