= Alex Hodgson =

Alex Hodgson (born 12 August 1961) is a Scottish folk singer/songwriter signed to the record label Greentrax Recordings. In his early professional career, Alex was the drummer and lead vocalist of The Last Resort alongside working as a technician at Edinburgh City Art Centre and then Preston Lodge High School however began to focus on his solo career after his first album launch with Greentrax Recordings 'Jeelie Jars and Coalie Backies' in July, 2010. His second album 'The Brig Tae Nae Where', was met with positive reviews by the Scottish Folk scene and several tracks were used for local historical exhibitions. Notably including 'The Battle of Pinkie Cleugh exhibition in Musselburgh Museum, Scots Language Centre and on the album 'The Music & Song of Great Tapestry of Scotland' which also featured The Proclaimers, The Battlefield Band, Gordon Gunn and Alastair Mcdonald.

Alex has also been featured on the Album 'A Tribute in Music and Song to John Bellany (Scottish artist) with his song titled 'The Reel John Bellany' alongside The Corries, Davy Steele, Aly Bain and Phil Cunningham.

Born and raised in his hometown of Prestonpans, Alex was brought up in the same town that was made famous by the Jacobite battlefield of the Battle of Prestonpans and was surrounded by countless other historical sites in East Lothian. Using the rich history of his surroundings as inspiration, he has, through his song writing, tried to spread his interest in the Scottish history of his home. As a two-time winner of 'Burnsong', an international songwriting competition held to celebrate the works of Robert Burns, Alex has played in the Scottish Parliament Building, at Balmoral Castle for Queen Elizabeth II at her annual Ghillie's Ball and has travelled the world celebrating his Scottish heritage through song.
