= Tranent Tower =

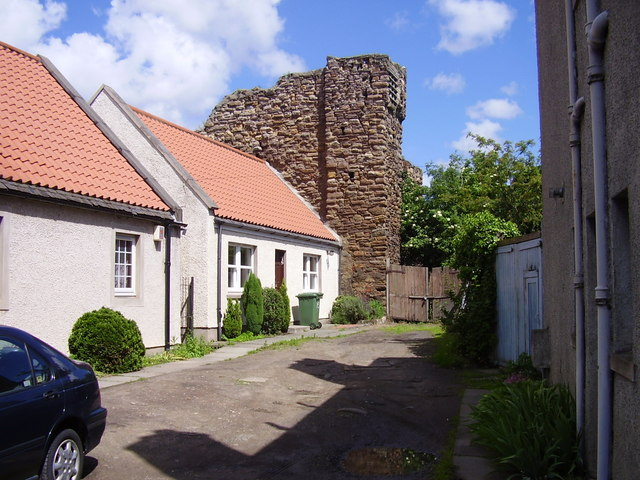
- The remains of Tranent Tower

- Location within East Lothian
- 55.9445°N 2.9543°W
- Location: Tranent, East Lothian; GB grid reference NT404730

Scheduled monument
- Designated: 15 January 1953
- Reference no.: SM778

Tranent Tower is a ruined L-plan tower house dating from the 16th century, in Tranent, East Lothian, Scotland. The remains are protected as a scheduled monument.

== History ==
Tranent Tower was built on lands belonging to the Seton family in 1542, and may have been built for them, but it was acquired by the Vallance family in the sixteenth century, who retained it until the nineteenth century. At one time it may have been used as a barracks, and in the early twentieth century as a hay loft.

== Structure ==
The small tower is at the end of a lane in the town of Tranent, which has grown up around it. The remains are protected as a Scheduled Ancient Monument.

There are two vaulted chambers in the basement. There is a main block of three storeys, and a four-storey stair-wing. It has a pantiled roof. The first floor included the hall. The tower is in a poor state of repair. The stair-wing is at the south-west corner. The entrance is to the south, as are most of the windows. This suggests that there was a barmkin on this side, but there is no other evidence for this.

The tower, which measures 11.2 by 7.6 metres (37 by 25 ft), is constructed in buff and brown sandstone rubble. It is likely that there was a corbelled out watch-chamber at the head of the stair which was later made into a dovecote which had a single-pitch roof. There were crow-stepped gables. The roof was still pantiled in the mid-20th century, but this is unlikely to have been its original covering and the upper storey may have been considerably reworked.

There is a cross wall subdividing each floor. These walls appear to be early insertions. Probably there were earlier, less permanent, cross partitions. The hall has a large blocked fireplace, a lavabo, aumbries, and what may be a buffet recess in the north wall.
