= Radio Saltire =

Coordinates: 55.944225°N 2.953893°W

- Tranent; Scotland
- Broadcast area: East Lothian
- Frequencies: 106.7 FM; 107.2 FM; DAB

Programming
- Format: Community

History
- First air date: 10 October 2011

Links
- Webcast: Radio Saltire Player
- Website: Radio Saltire

Radio Saltire is a community radio station based in Tranent, Scotland, broadcasting primarily to East Lothian on 106.7 & 107.2 FM, DAB and online.

The station was originally founded as East Lothian FM.

In September 2013 they re-branded as Radio Saltire and moved to Tranent, East Lothian.

In July 2023, they started to broadcast on DAB.
