= Andrew McDowall, Lord Bankton =

Scottish lawyer and Senator of the College of Justice

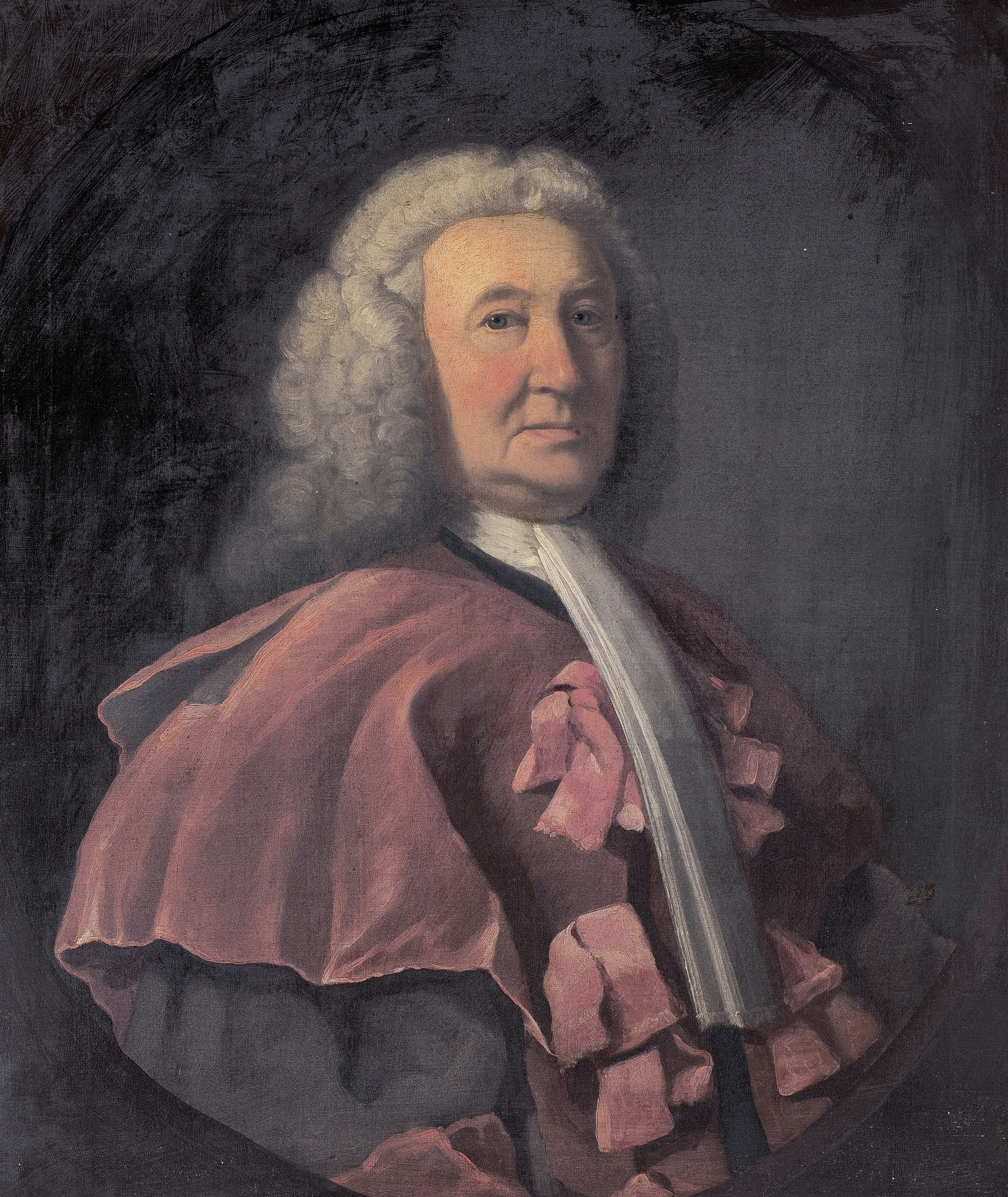
Andrew McDowall, Lord Bankton

Andrew McDowall (or Douall), Lord Bankton (1685–1760) was a Scottish lawyer and Senator of the College of Justice.

== Life ==
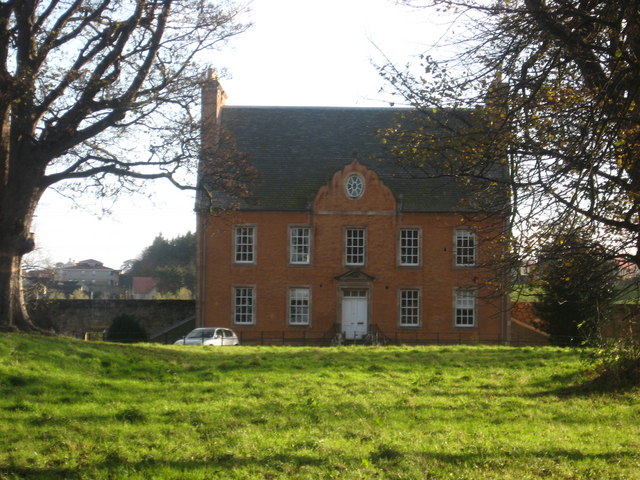
Bankton House

He was born the second son of Robert McDowall of Logan, East Ayrshire and his wife, Sarah Shaw daughter of John Shaw of Greenock. Andrew trained in Law at Edinburgh University and passed the Scottish bar as an advocate around 1705. He became a successful advocate in Edinburgh.

In 1745 he purchased Bankton House in Prestonpans, east of Edinburgh, from the estate of the late Col.Gardiner who had been killed in the Battle of Prestonpans.

On 5 July 1755 he was elected a Senator of the College of Justice in place of the late John Sinclair, Lord Murkle.

He died at Bankton House on 22 October 1760. His position as Senator was filled by James Veitch, Lord Elliock.

== Publications ==
- An Institute of the Laws of Scotland in Civil Rights (4 vols) 1751 to 1758 which compares the differences between Scottish and English Laws and continues in use as a reference book.

== Family ==
In 1743 (aged 58) he was married to Helen Grant. They had no children.

== Artistic recognition ==
He was portrayed around 1756 by William Millar and the Scottish National Portrait Gallery hold an etching of Lord Bankton by Thomas Worlidge.
