= Bankton House =

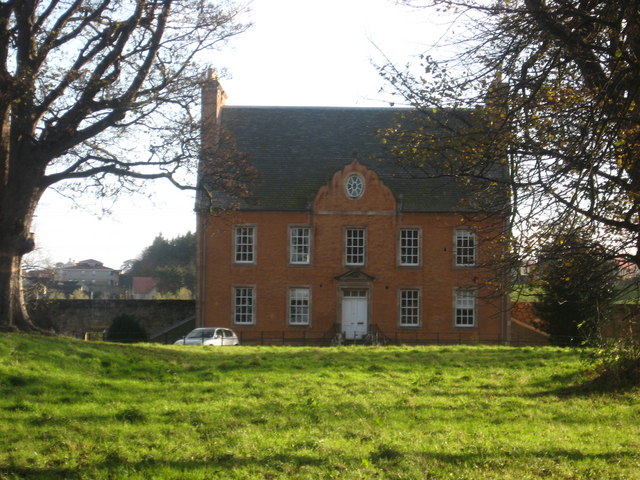
- North front of Bankton House

- Location within East Lothian
- 55.9525°N 2.970278°W

Listed Building – Category B
- Designated: 18 December 1879
- Reference no.: LB17546

Bankton House is a late 17th-century house situated south of Prestonpans in East Lothian, Scotland. The house is located between the A1 road and the East Coast Main Line railway at grid reference NT394736.

== Pre-Reformation ==
In the 12th century, the monks of Newbattle Abbey were granted lands at Prestongrange, to the west of Prestonpans, by Robert de Quincy. Their main purpose at Prestongrange, apart from prayers and solace, was the panning of salt on the southern shores of the Firth of Forth. To heat the salt pans they used wood at first, but then found a plentiful supply of fuel in the rich coalfields of East Lothian.

The monks used specific routes between Newbattle and the mother house at Melrose Abbey as well as a route between Prestongrange and Newbattle which would pass the Abbot's dwellings at Inveresk. Those roads became known as the Salter's Roads. There appears to be clear evidence that another route led past what is now Bankton, and on that route the monks' procession would stop. At the site of the stop an establishment was erected which became known as "Holy Stop", later known as Oliestob. Following the Scottish Reformation in 1560 when the lands of Bankton passed to Mark Kerr, Commendator of Newbattle.

== Secular history ==
Alexander Seton, 1st Viscount of Kingston, writing as early as 1687, relates that his grandfather, Robert, 1st Earl of Winton, provided the lands of "Hollistobe, vulgo Olivestob" to Alexander's uncle, Sir Thomas Seton, the earl's fourth son. The 1st Earl of Winton died in 1603, and therefore the Setons must have owned Olivestob before 1603.

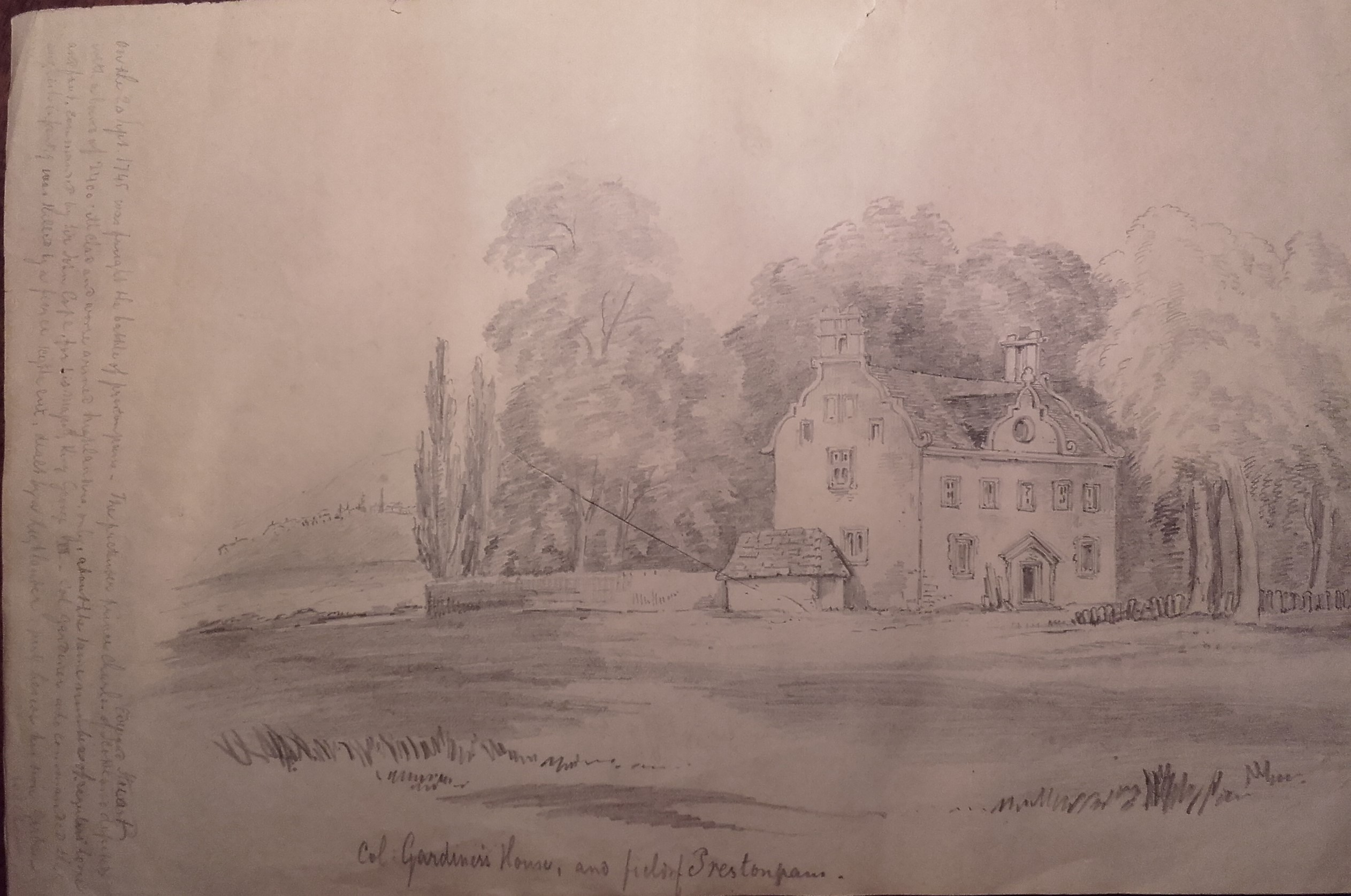
Anonymous. Drawing of the house after 1745. Four lines on the left side relate to colonel Gardiner's death.

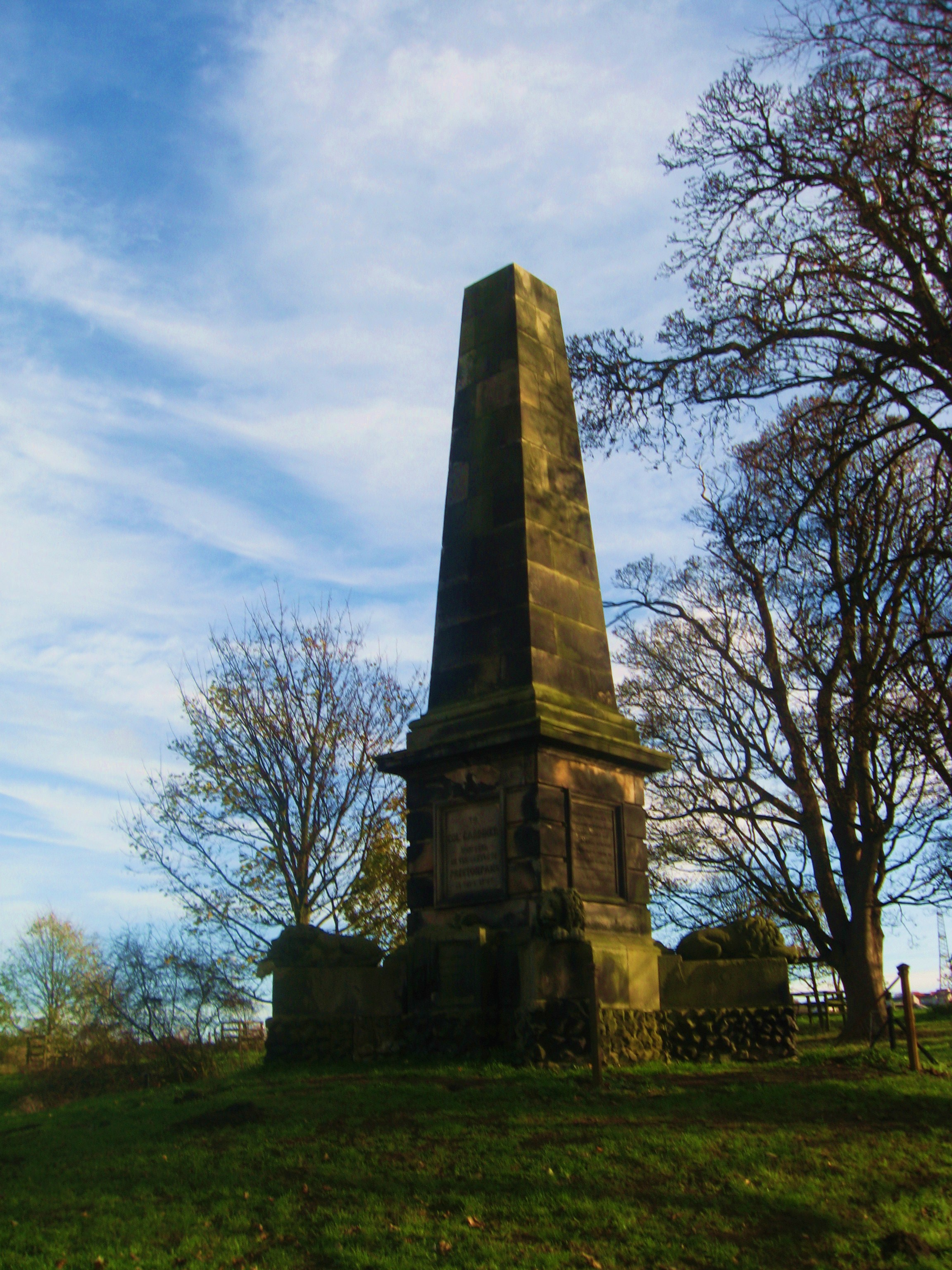
Gardiner Monument erected in 1853 by Alexander Ritchie from public subscription

Sir John Hamilton, a descendant of the Hamiltons of Boreland, bought Olivestob from Sir John Seton in 1624 and, on his death, left the house to his son William. In 1674, Captain Thomas Hamilton, younger brother of William, bought the estates. Later that year Thomas married Grizell Hamilton of Westport. Grizell's grandfather owned the nearby estate at Preston and was the brother of Thomas Hamilton, 1st Earl of Haddington. Captain Hamilton was previously in service in Sweden but on his return to Edinburgh as a merchant was promoted to Colonel in the Edinburgh Regiment. Colonel Hamilton's son James studied law at Leiden in Holland and was admitted as an advocate in 1708. He was later appointed Sheriff of Haddington by Queen Anne, a position he held until 1715.

James Hamilton suffered serious debt problems and was forced to sell the estate in 1733 to Colonel James Gardiner, a distinguished army officer. Some confusion arises when the name was changed to Bankton but, according to Doddridge, Colonel Gardiner called his new home Bankton since he had received several letters from the officer addressed as Bankton.

Colonel Gardiner was mortally wounded at the Battle of Prestonpans on 21 September 1745, within sight of his own home. He was leading a rear guard action of British troops against the Highland rebels of Charles Edward Stuart (Bonnie Prince Charlie) when he was cut down. He died later that day at the manse of Tranent Parish Church less than a mile away.

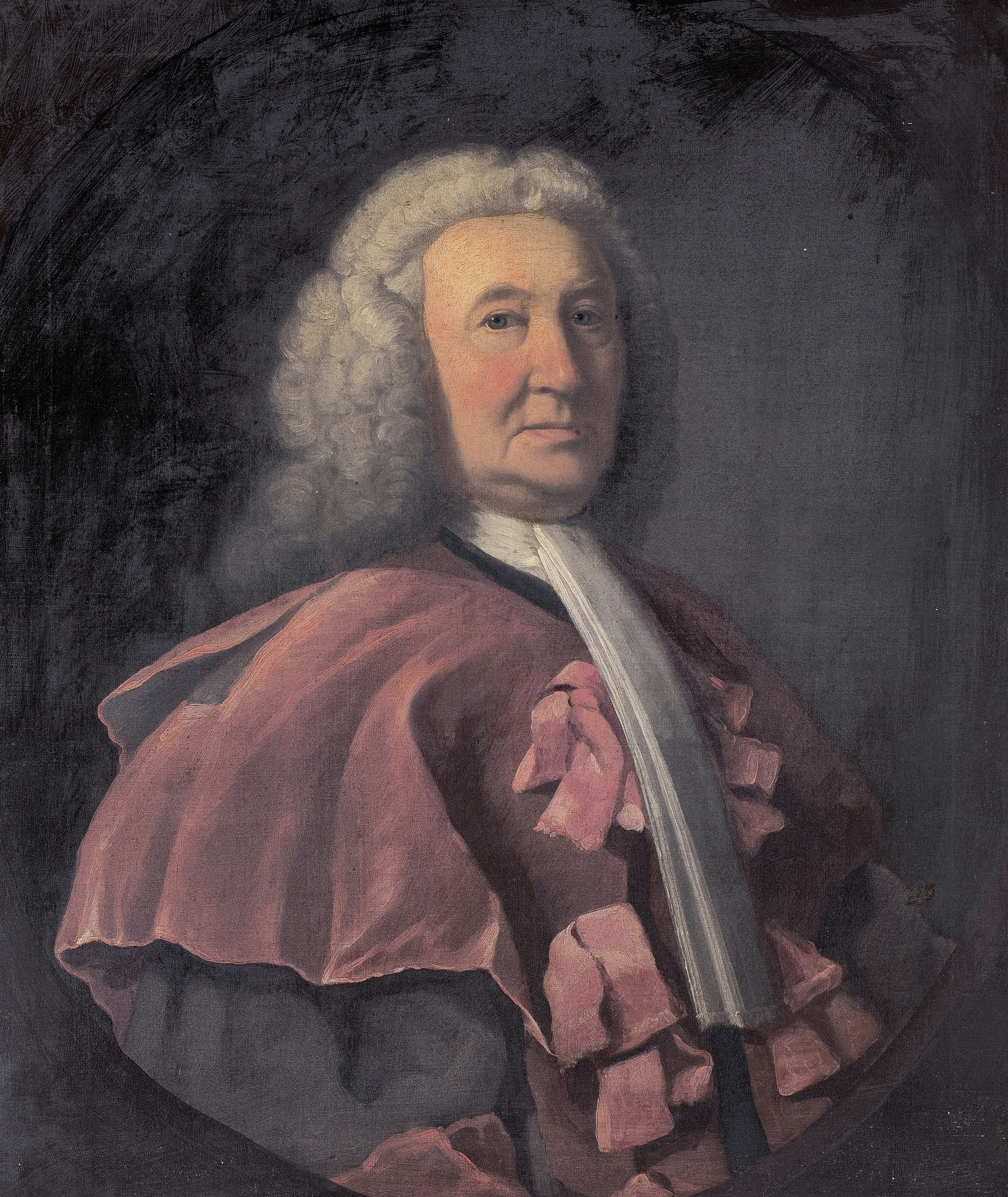
Andrew McDouall, Lord Bankton (William Millar, 1758)

Following the death of Colonel Gardiner, the house was purchased by Andrew McDouall, an eminent Edinburgh advocate. Ten years later, in 1755, McDouall was elevated to the bench of the High Courts of Scotland, and assumed the name of Lord Bankton. On McDouall's death, he bequeathed money for the poor of Prestonpans. The house remained in the McDouall family into the 20th century, and a farm was administered from the house by tenants. A colliery was sunk just to the west of the house.

In 1852, fire destroyed Bankton House. The house was restored, only to meet the same fate in 1966. It was a category A listed building before the 1966 fire and, in 1971, was described as a "non impressive ruin".

== Restoration ==
Between 1988 and 1995, the house was given a new lease of life when the Lothian Building Preservation Trust undertook to re-build the ruins and renew the house. The initiative was funded by grants from Historic Scotland, East Lothian Council and Scottish Natural Heritage. The house is now divided into separate apartments. The two pavilions still stand at either side of the garden. The west pavilion, a former doocot (dovecot), now contains an exhibition on the restoration, and a history of the house. Bankton House and Colonel Gardiner's Monument within the grounds are both category B listed buildings.
