= Elphinstone, East Lothian =

Coordinates: 55.922°N 2.966°W

Elphinstone
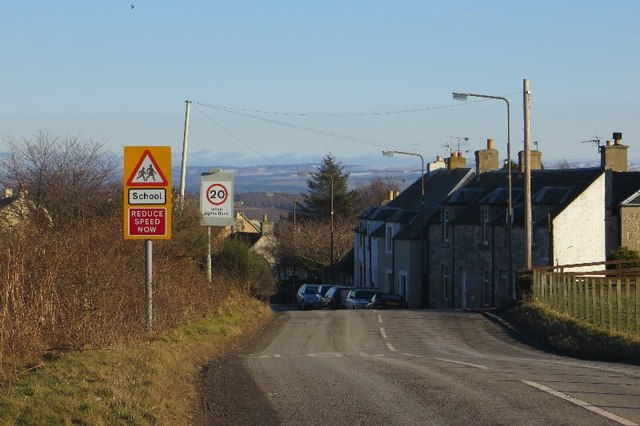

- Location within East Lothian
- Population: 590 (2020)
- OS grid reference: NT396702
- Council area: East Lothian
- Lieutenancy area: East Lothian
- Country: Scotland
- Sovereign state: United Kingdom
- Post town: TRANENT
- Postcode district: EH33
- Dialling code: 01875
- Police: Scotland
- Fire: Scottish
- Ambulance: Scottish
- UK Parliament: East Lothian
- Scottish Parliament: East Lothian

Elphinstone is a village in East Lothian, Scotland, southwest of Tranent. The ruins of Elphinstone Tower, the former seat of the Elphinstone family, lie nearby.

== Etymology ==
The village's name was first recorded in the 13th century. It may mean "estate belonging to Ælfwine", from Old English Ælfwinestun. A local fairy tale offers a more fantastical origin for the name, tracing it back to an elf who was imprisoned in stone by a witch whom he had crossed.

== History ==
The Protestant reformer George Wishart was brought to Elphinstone by Patrick Hepburn, 3rd Earl of Bothwell en route to St Andrews where he was tried and burned at the stake on 1 March 1546.

Between 2011 and 2018 the population of the village increased from 520 to 590 and it has basic amenities, including a primary school, a community centre, a newsagent, and a miners welfare club.

== Landmarks and economy ==
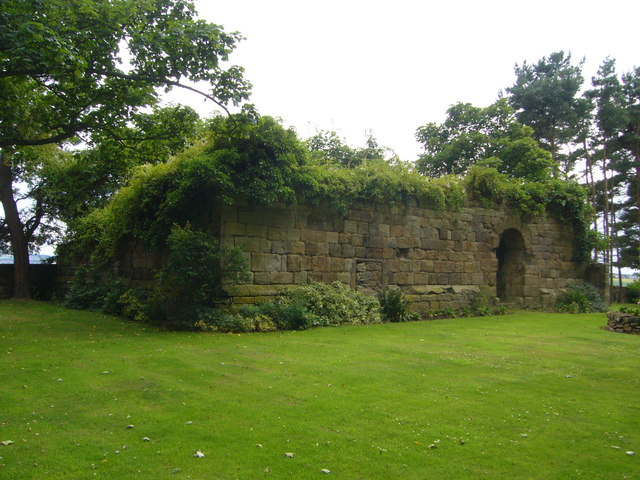
The remains of Elphinstone Tower

Located half a mile west of the village, Elphinstone Tower, built in the 13th to 15th century, is a former five-storey tower, now a ruin, with only the lower level remaining. The Elphinstone clan held the lands of Elphinstone and took their name from their lands.

Mines owned by the Edinburgh Colliery Company, Limited were formerly the main employer in the village. Many of the houses in the village were owned by the company. now Inveresk Research International is one of the main employers in the area. Elphinstone Tower Farm produces cereal crops.
