= Tranent =

Town in East Lothian, Scotland

Coordinates: 55.945°N 2.954°W

Tranent: Scottish Gaelic: Tranant
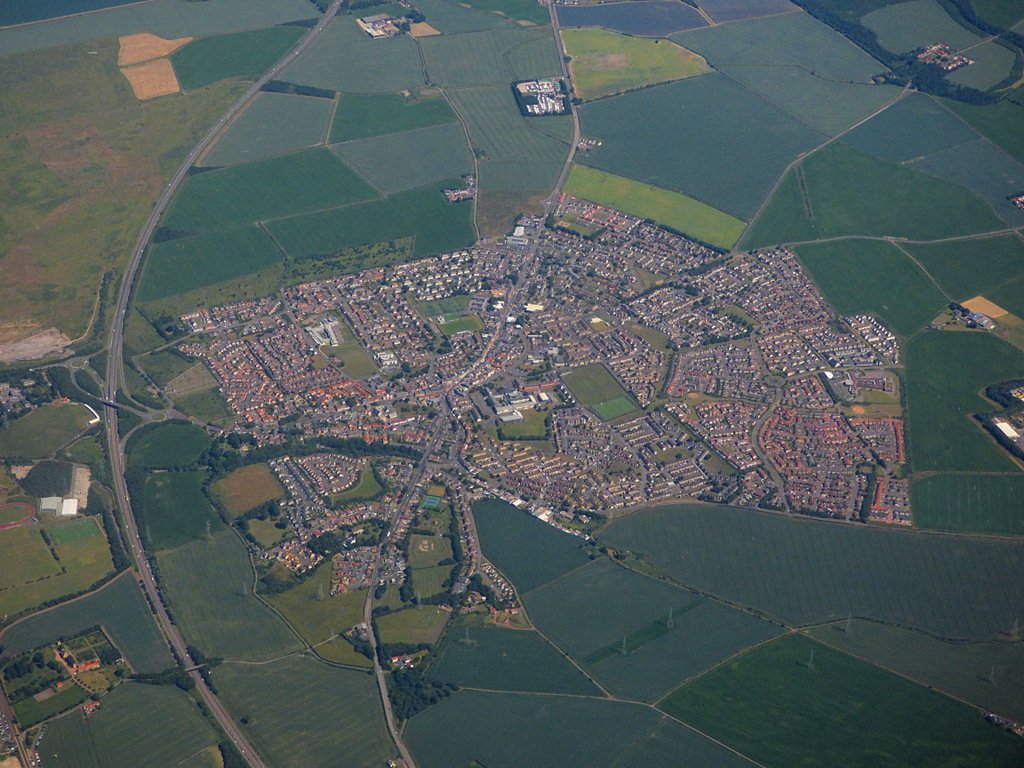
- Tranent from the air

- Location within East Lothian
- Population: 11,910 (2020)
- Demonym: Belter(s)
- OS grid reference: NT404728
  - Edinburgh: 9.1 mi (14.6 km)
  - London: 398.9 mi (642.0 km)
- Council area: East Lothian
- Lieutenancy area: East Lothian
- Country: Scotland
- Sovereign state: United Kingdom
- Post town: TRANENT
- Postcode district: EH33
- Dialling code: 01875
- Police: Scotland
- Fire: Scottish
- Ambulance: Scottish
- UK Parliament: East Lothian
- Scottish Parliament: East Lothian

Tranent /trəˈnɛnt/ is a town in East Lothian (formerly Haddingtonshire), in the south-east of Scotland. Tranent lies 6 mi (9.7 km) from the boundary of Edinburgh, and 9.1 mi (14.6 km) from the city centre. It lies south of the A1 road that runs through the parish splitting it from its associated villages and hamlets Meadowmill and the ports of Cockenzie and Port Seton. The original main post road ran straight through the town until the new A1 was built. Built on a gentle slope, about 90 metres (300 ft) above sea level it is one of the oldest towns in East Lothian. The population of the town is approximately 12,140, an increase of over 4,000 since 2001. Tranent was formerly a major mining town, but now serves as a commuter town for Edinburgh.

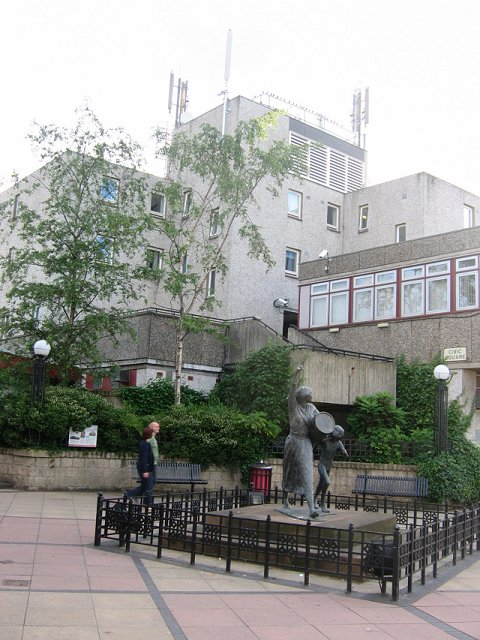
Memorial to the Massacre of Tranent in Civic Square

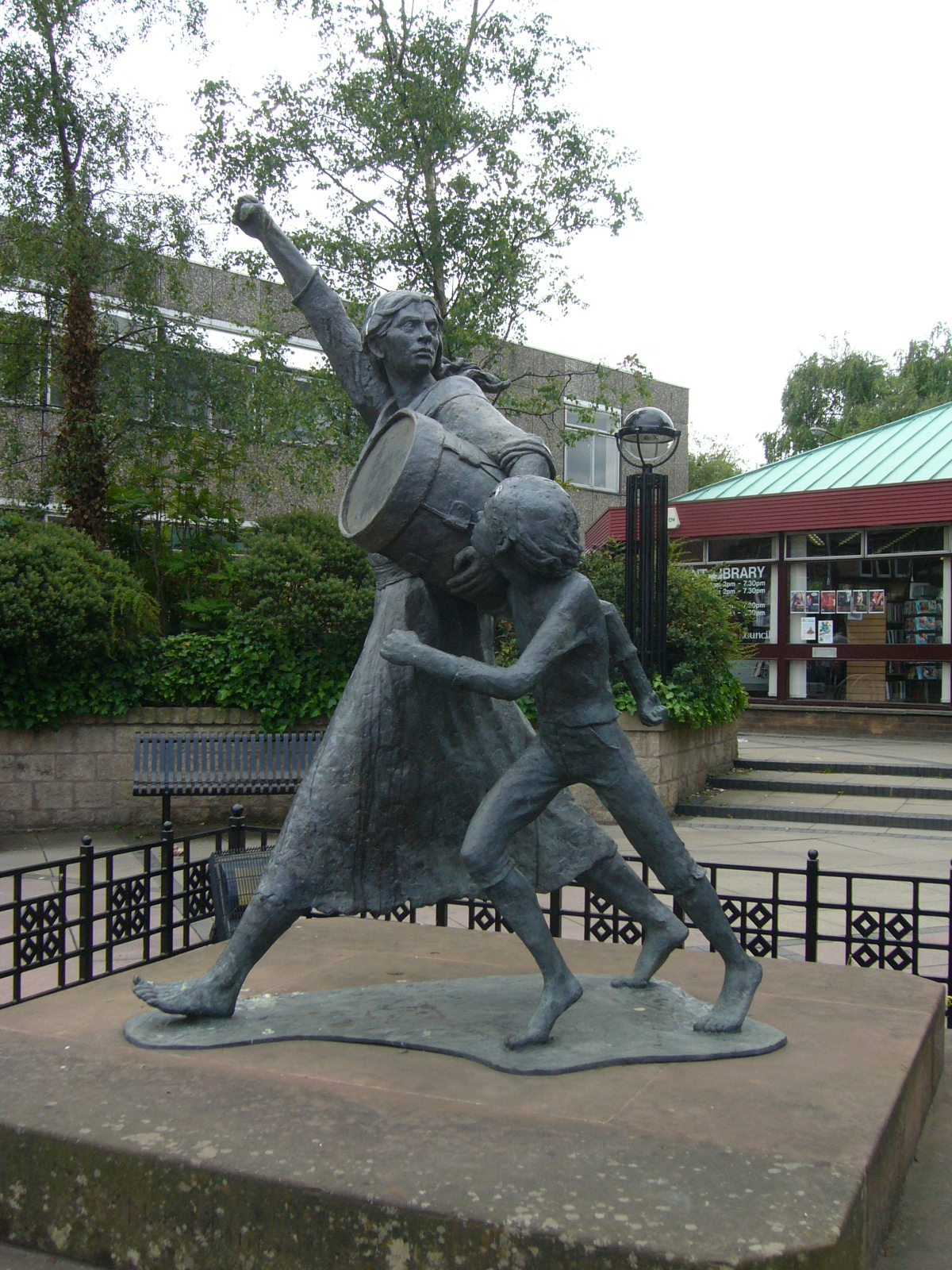
A memorial in Tranent commemorating Jackie Crookstone's role in the massacre of Tranent.

== History ==
The name is thought to be of Brythonic origin, possibly containing the elements Tre and Nant, meaning town over the stream Travernant.

Tranent was once an important mining town, and coal was first worked there in the thirteenth century by the monks of Newbattle Abbey who mined a nearby 2.5m / 7 ft thick coal deposit called the "Great Seam". The town possesses the oldest coal-mining charter (1202–1218) in Great Britain, and the history of coal mining in Scotland is mirrored in the history of the coal heughs, mines and pits of Tranent. Tranent is now a commuter town supporting the south-east of Scotland and, more specifically, Edinburgh.

The Massacre of Tranent took place in 1797, when local people were killed by soldiers after a protest against conscription into the county militia under the Militia Act 1797. One of the 12 victims, Jackie Crookston, is depicted on the memorial that commemorates the dead in Tranent's Civic Square.

In connection with the annual commemoration of the Battle of Prestonpans (originally called the Battle of Gladsmuir, and then renamed the Battle of Tranent, before many decades later being renamed the Battle of Prestonpans) there are plans to recreate a small portion of the Tranent to Cockenzie Waggonway which dates back to 1722.

There is a long history of settlement in Tranent, perhaps dating back to prehistory. There are several historic buildings in and around the town, including the ruins of the old parish church, parts of which date from the 11th century and which was demolished in 1797, while a few miles south-west of the town stands Fa'side Castle, sometimes known as Falside or Fawside, a fourteenth-century L-shaped tower house.

Isabella Begg née Burns, the youngest sister of Robert Burns, moved to Tranent from Ormiston with her family after her son William resigned his post as the schoolmaster. She supported her family with the help of her daughters Agnes and Isabella, working as dressmakers. In 1843 she moved to Bridge House in Alloway, South Ayrshire.

=== Industry ===
Coal was first mined in Tranent Parish when Robert de Quincy granted rights in the early-thirteenth century to the monks of Newbattle to mine at Prestoungrange, which was then part of that parish. Soon many wealthy families in the parish joined the rush to mine coal. Heughs (surface mines), were being cut throughout the area. Longniddry, St. Germains, Fa'side, Ormiston (much later town) and Elphinstone, all parts of old Tranent, had their collieries and for the next 750 years, the industry prospered. Other industries grew to employ increasing populations: distilleries, breweries, tanneries and metal implement works. Quarries opened providing stone for homes. Farming was modernised and mills opened to provide food. The nineteenth-century saw a slowdown in industrial growth and, gradually, industry centralised and moved to larger centres. The coal industry had peaked and the twentieth century brought about a slow, but terminal decline. The last large deep mine closed in 1961, then in 2000, the opencast mine at Blindwells closed.

== Literature ==
William Dunbar's poem the Lament for the Makaris includes the name Clerk of Tranent as a poet, probably of the fifteenth century, citing him as an author of the Anteris of Gawain. Some examples of such works exist but he has not been traced.

Tranent is the birthplace of Lizzie in Lucy Booth's novel 'The Life of Death', a chilling love story in which Lizzie/Death enters a pact with the devil to regain her life, live and love.

== Tranent's Gala ==
Since 1934 Tranent has held a Gala Week which is arranged by local volunteers who are part of the Gala Committee. Events during the gala week include the crowning of the Queen who is accompanied by 29 other children from the town, the celebrations on the fields at Ross High School and the grand parade which is made up of local groups and people and which goes through the town. Tranent Gala is funded by donations and fundraising.

The Gala was first formed in 1934 by the miners of Tranent who aimed to form a special event for people in the town.

== Local amenities ==
=== Supermarkets ===
The town has two supermarkets. On the east of the town's High Street, there is an Asda supermarket which opened in August 2015, replacing the Co-operative Food. There is also an Aldi supermarket on the far east side of the town which opened in October 2015.

=== Healthcare ===
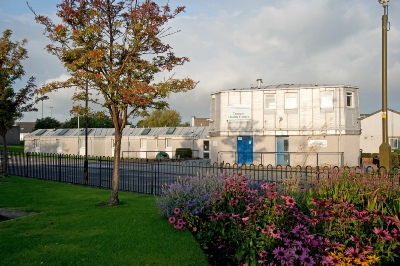
Tranent Health Centre

Tranent falls within the NHS Lothian Health Board is home to two pharmacies: a Well Pharmacy and a Lloyds Pharmacy These pharmacies serve the local GP practice which is the responsibility of NHS Lothian. The nearest hospitals include The East Lothian Community Hospital in Haddington which is a community hospital offering general medical and geriatric rehabilitation services to patients in East Lothian. It also provides geriatric services, including continuing care for the elderly and the nearest Accident and Emergency hospital is the Royal Infirmary of Edinburgh.

=== Loch Centre ===
Located in the centre of Tranent, the Loch Centre is a dedicated Sports & Community Centre that opened in 1973. Facilities include a 25 metre swimming pool, health suite, multi-purpose hall, dance studios, Bodyworks Gym and children's soft play area. The swimming pool and health suite have been closed since early 2023 due to disrepair, £5 million in funding has been allocated to allow repairs to take place on the facility which are estimated to begin in June 2026 and finish by June 2027.

== Transport ==
Tranent has good transport links with Edinburgh to the west and the more rural communities of East Lothian to the east.

=== Roads ===
The A1 road also runs by the town with junctions at the north and west ends of the town.

The A199 road runs through the town westbound to Edinburgh, and eastbound to Macmerry.

=== Public transport ===
==== Buses ====
Most bus services in the town are operated by Lothian Buses and its division East Coast Buses which provide services.

The town is also served by Prentice, a bus and coach company based in nearby Haddington.

==== ACs Taxis ====
AC's Taxis and Minibuses have been operating taxi and coach services in East Lothian and Edinburgh for over 40 years. The fleet features a range of vehicles, from standard taxis to larger coaches, Including 16, 33, 37, 57 and 61-seater coaches. Their headquarters are located on Elphinstone road

== Education ==
=== Schools ===
The town is home to three primary schools and one secondary school. The primary schools are; (largest to smallest) Windygoul Primary School, Sanderson's Wynd Primary School and St Martins Primary School. The secondary school Ross High School, Tranent established in 1954 accommodates over 1200 pupils from Tranent and villages around the area; these are Macmerry, Ormiston, Humbie, Elphinstone, Pencaitland, New Winton and Saltoun.

=== Learning ===
In October 2012, a new council building was opened under the name of The George Johnstone Centre which is named in honour of the miner who saved the lives of more than 50 men at Fleets Pit, Tranent when the mine flooded in 1929. The men took five hours to find an alternative way out, but all were rescued and survived thanks to the early warning given by George Johnstone. The building accommodates a range of services including a large library with a computer suite, and council offices allowing residents to access housing and tenancy advice, report a housing repair, report minor crimes to Police Scotland and make Council Tax and rent payments and general enquiries. The building is run by East Lothian Council.

== Sport ==
=== Football ===
The local football team is Tranent F.C. who won the Scottish Junior Cup in 1934–35, being the runners up two seasons before. The Juniors play their football at Foresters Park in the centre of the town and compete in the Lowland League East.

=== Rugby ===
The Ross High Rugby Football Club currently plays in the RBS East Regional League Division 1 and play their home games at Blawearie Road, adjacent to the Ross High School.

=== Cricket ===
The local club is Tranent & Preston Village Cricket Club which was established in 2010. The club currently plays in the East of Scotland Cricket Association Divisions 1, 3, 5, 7, 8 and 9.

== Media ==
Tranent is the home of Radio Saltire. Its studios are on Civic Square.

== Places of worship ==
Throughout the history of Tranent, there have been several places of Worship. Currently, there is:

Tranent Parish Church (Church of Scotland) – The present church at Tranent was built by John Simpson and opened in 1800, as what is believed to be at least the third church in the town. Local legend has it that a chapel dedicated to St. Martin of Tours and was associated with Lindisfarne in the 8th century. The first known mention of a church at Tranent came in 1145 when it was established by the archdeacon, Thor, son of a local landowner. The church was granted by Richard, Archbishop of St Andrews and later confirmed by Saer de Quincy, the local baron. Tranent parish came under the jurisdiction of the canons of Holyrood Abbey and the building was described as being of a higher standard than the normal country church. Although a settlement grew around the church by 1251, it remained in the hands of Holyrood. There are also canonical records of a chapel, dedicated to St. Peter, situated on a ridge overlooking a coal-bearing ravine at Travernant.

The church was badly damaged in 1544 and 1547, each time by the forces of the Earl of Hertford during the Rough Wooing. Tranent Parish Church joined the Scottish Reformation when Thomas Cranstoun, the first minister took over from the evicted canons and the last Roman Catholic priest, Thomas Moffat; the church of St. Peter was now a reformed Protestant church. The church remained a ruinous condition, after Somerset's attack, into the 17th century and, though it was refurbished, it is not known when. The church was said to have been restored, extended and improved throughout, but in 1799 the decision was made to build a new church which was opened in 1800, a church which still stands high above the ravine overlooking the Firth of Forth. At a total cost of over 10,000 pounds, the church was extensively refurbished and refurnished in 1954. The congregation had to meet in the town hall during the work, but the church they returned to is much the same as it is today. The church is a category B listed building. Meets at 11 am every Sunday unless intimated at the church located on Church Street.

St Martins of Tours (Roman Catholic) – This is the third church building on the site in one hundred years and was built in 1969, to designs by the prolific church architect Charles W Gray, in an octagonal shape using a Scandinavian compressed timber girder design. Contains two rough stained glass windows and an early 20th-century Italian crucifix above the altar. Irish limestone statue of classical design of St Martin as a Roman soldier and an original icon of St Martin in Orthodox style. Sunday Mass 9.30 am; Monday Eucharistic Service, 9.00 am; Tuesday Mass, 7.30 pm; Wednesday Eucharistic Service, 10.00 am; Thursday Mass, 10.00 am; Thursday Mass, 10.00 am; Friday Eucharistic service, 10.00 am

Tranent and Cockenzie Methodist Church – Sunday service is at 11.00 am – In 2014, Cockenzie became a class of Tranent Methodist Church. In 2015, Tranent with Cockenzie began to meet and worship together at 28 Edinburgh Road, Prestonpans.

The Salvation Army – 10.30am, Sunday Worship. 25 Winton Place, Tranent.

Rivers of Fire Ministry – Formally the Fraser centre. Currently, meet and worship with the Salvation Army and are in the process of building a new centre.

Several independent congregations meet in and around Tranent.

== Notable residents ==
- Ian Black, footballer
- Peter Hume Brown, historian
- Alex Marshall, World Champion bowler
- Gordon Kennedy, actor, Absolutely, inserted photographs of Tranent in its sketch based on the bizarre, fictional town of Stoneybridge.
- George McNeill, athlete
- Neil Martin, footballer, three full international caps for Scotland
- Ian McParland, footballer
- Morris Stevenson, footballer
- Pat Stanton, footballer
- Leeroy Makovora, footballer
- Gordon Woods, Philanthropist and Comedian.
- Tom Smith, rugby union (Ross, High, Gala RFC and Scotland) and basketball player (Dalkeith Saints, Scotland)

== Places of interest ==
- Fa'side Castle
- Tranent Tower
- Tranent Parish Church
- Radio Saltire
