= Swasche =

Percussion instrument
- Other names: Swesche, Swasher, Sueschoour, Suescher, Swash, Suesche, Sivasche
- Classification: Percussion
- Hornbostel–Sachs classification: (Membranophone)

Playing range
- Deep sounds

Related instruments
- Drum

The swasche, also spelled swesche, swasher, sueschoour, suescher, swash, suesche, and sivasche, was a type of drum used in Scotland for various purposes, to call attention to an announcement or event, but also as an accompaniment to sports events and military formations. It is perhaps of Swiss origin.
