= Tranent Parish Church =

Church in East Lothian, Scotland

Coordinates: 55.9497°N 2.9580°W

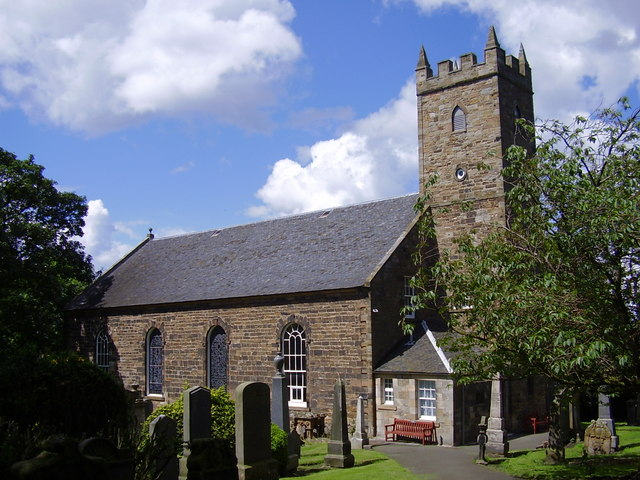
Tranent Kirk

Tranent Parish Church is a kirk belonging to the Church of Scotland. It is situated on the East Lothian town of Tranent 10 miles (16 km) south-east of Edinburgh. The church lies in the north side of town, the original settlement, tucked in a small lane at the foot of Church Street at grid reference NT402734.

== History ==
The present church at Tranent was built by John Simpson and opened in 1800, as what is believed to be at least the third church in the town. Local legend has it that a chapel dedicated to St. Martin of Tours and was associated with Lindisfarne in the 8th century. The town's original Brythonic name, Travernant, meaning "settlement on the ridge overlooking a ravine", tends to show there was a settlement there in the 8th century. The first known mention of a church at Tranent came in 1145 when it was established by the archdeacon, Thor, son of a local landowner. The church was granted by Richard, Archbishop of St Andrews and later confirmed by Saer de Quincy, the local baron. Tranent parish came under the jurisdiction of the canons of Holyrood Abbey and the building was described as being of a higher standard than the normal country church. Although a settlement grew around the church by 1251, it remained in the hands of Holyrood.

The church was badly damaged in 1544 and 1547, each time by the forces of the Earl of Hertford during the Rough Wooing. Tranent Parish Church joined the Scottish Reformation when Thomas Cranstoun, the first minister took over from the evicted canons and the last Roman Catholic priest, Thomas Moffat; the church of St. Peter was now a reformed Protestant church. The church remained in a ruinous condition, after Somerset's attack, into the 17th century and, though it was refurbished, it is not known when. The church was said to have been restored, extended and improved throughout, but in 1799 the decision was made to build a new church which was opened in 1800, a church which still stands high above the ravine overlooking the Firth of Forth. At a total cost of over 10,000 pounds, the church was extensively refurbished and refurnished in 1954. The congregation had to meet in the town hall during the work, but the church they returned to is much the same as it is today. The church is a category B listed building.

Colonel James Gardiner is buried in the kirkyard.

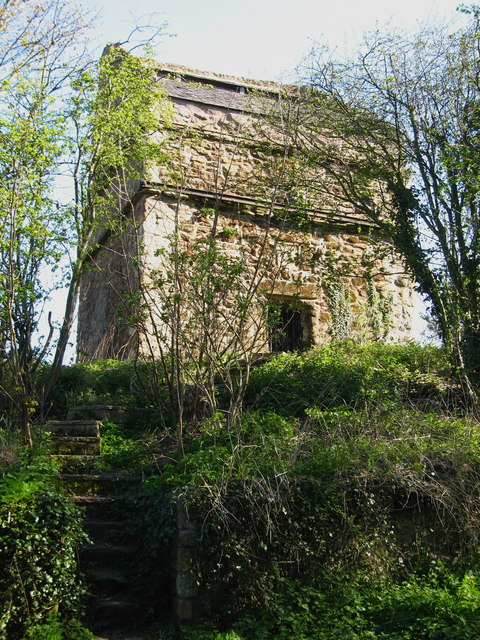
Doocot at Tranent Kirk
