= Jackie Crookstone =

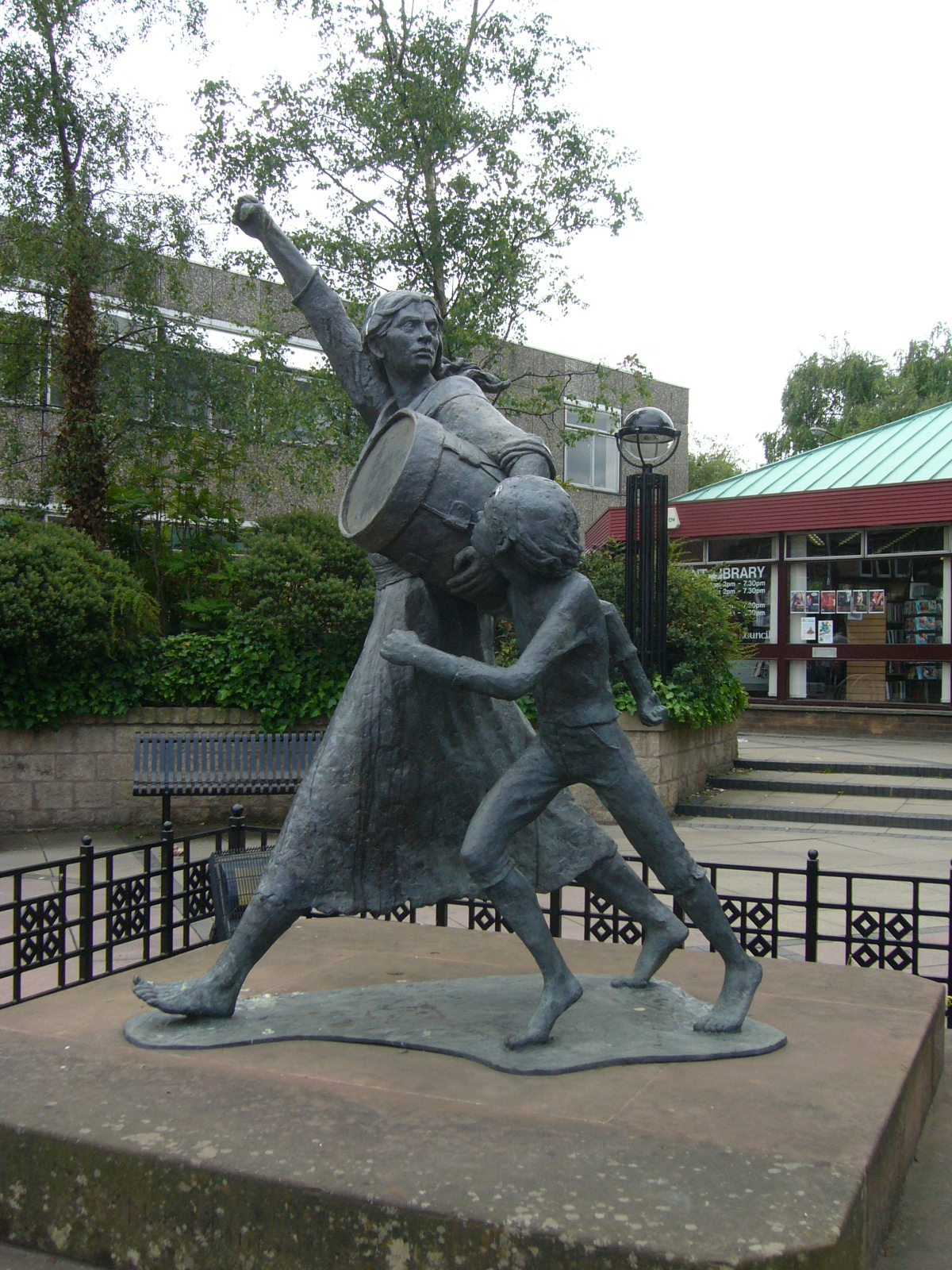
Jackie Crookston memorial in Tranent, Scotland

Jackie Crookston (12 June 1768 – 29 August 1797), also known as Joan Crookston, was a Scottish woman associated with the riots leading to the massacre of Tranent, and a victim of the massacre.

== Early life ==
Joanna Crookston was born in Old Kirk in Gladsmuir, East Lothian the daughter of Agnes Hogg and James Crookston.

== Massacre of Tranent ==
The Scottish Militia Act 1797 conscripted able bodied Scottish men between the ages of nineteen and twenty-three into military service. Aberdeen, Dalry, Galston, Strathaven, Freuchie, and Kirkintilloch all saw rioting as a result, and the government responded by sending in troops. In records compiled in 1844, a local historian noted the women of Scotland were outraged at the thought of their men being conscripted to fight in the army just as they had reached manhood and acquired a profession. It fell to schoolmasters to make up the conscription lists, and as a result they were met with protests from local residents.

When the army rode into Tranent on 28 August 1797 to pick up the conscriptees, they found the roads lined with women and children. One woman is said to have approached the entourage and said, "John, beware of your head!" This was taken to be a direct threat and to indicate there might be trouble in Tranent. Once in the village itself, the brigade tried to proceed to the assigned meeting point, but there was a crowd gathering with sticks and a drum. Crookston is recorded to have approached the leader and advised them to leave. Another source gives Crookstone a larger role in the events, saying she organised a protest march on 28 August 1797 with other women from nearby villages, and used a drum beat to call out the slogan "no militia" in an attempt to intimidate local landowners and justices on the ballot committee.

The militia conscription ballot went ahead on 29 August 1797. There was a protest, and soldiers who had been confined to the John Glens public house in Tranent broke out the back door and adopted a "shoot to kill" policy against the populace, who were allegedly armed with sharp sticks and stones. The dragoons rampaged through the streets, driving the protesters into the fields where the cavalry would be more effective. At least eleven people were killed, including Crookston. Her body lay undiscovered in a field of corn for several weeks. However, the number of deaths in the massacre is disputed. The Lord Advocate, Robert Dundas, decided not to indict the soldiers for shooting unarmed civilians because "such a dangerous mob as deserved more properly the name of an insurrection."

== Memorial ==
Crookston's role in the massacre of Tranent is commemorated by a statue in the civic square in Tranent. Designed by David Annand, it was unveiled in September 1995.
