= Leeroy Makovora =

Scottish footballer

Personal information
- Date of birth: 5 February 2002 (age 24)
- Place of birth: Tranent, Scotland
- Position: Striker

Youth career
- Tranent Colts
- Heart of Midlothian

Senior career*
Years	Team	Apps	(Gls)
2018–2021	Heart of Midlothian	1	(0)
2019–2020	→ Spartans (loan)		
2020	→ Brechin City (loan)	4	(1)
2020–2021	→ Gala Fairydean Rovers (loan)		
2021–2022	Civil Service Strollers		
2022–2023	Penicuik Athletic		
- * Club domestic league appearances and goals as of 23 December 2025

Leeroy Makovora (born 5 February 2002) is a Scottish professional footballer who plays as a striker.

== Career ==
He made his senior debut for Heart of Midlothian on 13 May 2018, in a 1–0 league defeat away at Kilmarnock. He was one of four Hearts youth players to make their debuts in that match, alongside Chris Hamilton, Cammy Logan, and Connor Smith.

In August 2019 he moved on loan to Spartans. He was then loaned to Brechin City in September 2020.

Makavora joined Gala Fairydean Rovers on loan on 2 December 2020.

He left Hearts on 31 May 2021, following the expiry of his contract.

Civil Service Strollers signed Makavora on 6 September 2021.

Makovora joined Penicuik Athletic for the 2022–23 season.

== Career statistics ==
As of 14 May 2018

Appearances and goals by club, season and competition
Club	Season	League			Scottish Cup		League Cup		Other		Total	
Club	Season	Division	Apps	Goals	Apps	Goals	Apps	Goals	Apps	Goals	Apps	Goals
Hearts	2017–18	Scottish Premiership	1	0	0	0	0	0	0	0	1	0
Career total			1	0	0	0	0	0	0	0	1	0
