= Fa'side Castle =

Building in East Lothian in Scotland

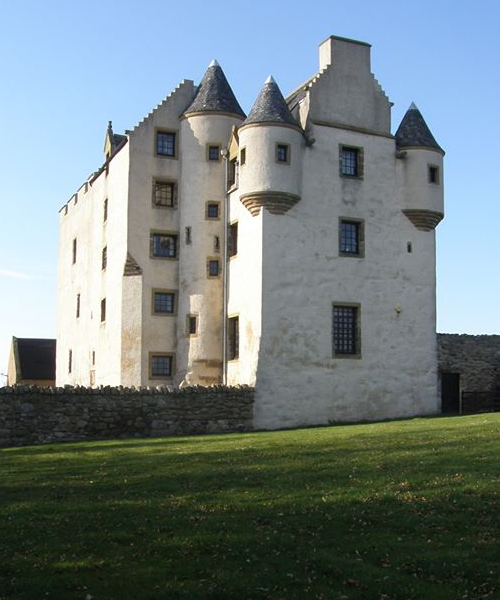
- Fa'side Castle, East Lothian

- Location within East Lothian

General information
- Coordinates: 55.9279°N 2.9975°W

Fa'side Castle (also Fawside or Falside) is a 15th-century keep located in East Lothian in Scotland. The castle is approximately 2 miles (3 kilometres) southwest of Tranent, and 2 mi (3 km) southeast of Musselburgh. The building was restored in the 1980s and is now protected as a category B listed building.

== Description ==
Fa'side is a 7,411 square feet (688.5 m^{2}) L-plan building, being a fifteenth-century four-storey keep with a later turreted block added. There is a vaulted basement. The castle stands on a high ridge with extensive views over East Lothian and the Firth of Forth.

== Early history ==
The earliest records of the building and land reflect that in the 1190's-early 1200's, it was in the possession of Saer de Quincy, 1st Earl of Winchester and son of Robert de Quincy. Saer de Quincy inherited several English and Scottish titles and estates through his marriage to Margaret, the sister of Robert de Beaumont, 2nd Earl of Leicester.

When Saer died, the earldom of Winchester and its land holdings passed to his son Roger de Quincy. When Roger de Quincy, 2nd Earl of Winchester d. 1264, the Tranent property and title passed to one of his sons-in-law Alan la Zouche, 1st Baron la Zouche of Ashby.

La Zouche was killed in battle in 1270, after which his widow, Helene (or "Ellen") de Quincy, remained in residence at the Tranent manor until her death.

Ellen's niece, Eleanor de Ferrers, widow of William de Ferrers, was visiting the manor when it was besieged by Sir William Douglas in 1288. Douglas kidnapped the widow de Ferrers during this event, and subsequently married her.

The land was lost to Robert the Bruce after the De Quincy family declared their loyalty to Edward I of England. Bruce granted the lands to the Seton family.

The Fawsydes of that Ilk acquired land in the area from the Setons in 1371, which was around the time when the building and hill all were renamed to "Falside" or "Fawside."

== 15th & 16th century ==
The earliest part of the present building was constructed by the Fawsydes in the 15th century.

The castle was burned by the English before the Battle of Pinkie Cleugh, which was fought on Falside Hill on 10 September 1547, suffocating or burning all those inside.

Mary, Queen of Scots left Fa'side on the morning of 15 June 1567 for the Battle of Carberry Hill. She changed into a short skirt and left her fine clothes behind in a chest.

The castle was rebuilt and extended to the south in the late 16th century. A surviving oak bed, now at Biggar Museum, was made for Margaret Fawside, who married Patrick Levingstone of Saltcoats near Gullane.

On 5 November 1620 a number of local and neighbouring landowners had dinner with Janet Lawson, Lady Fawside, at the castle and illegally combined together to set and raised the price of coals from their coalmines. The Privy Council of Scotland found their actions unlawful and the lairds were ordered to pay a fine of £2,000 and be imprisoned in Edinburgh Castle. In defence the landowners claimed their coal was unprofitable, that the workings of Little Fawside (belonging to the Master of Elphinstone) were on fire, and the Fawside coal mine had bankrupted the old laird.

The Fawsydes sold the castle in 1631 to an Edinburgh burgess and merchant called Hamilton.

== Ruin and renovation ==
The castle in 2013

By the 1700's the building had fallen into ruin, and no longer appeared on the East Lothian tax rolls.

In the 1970's, the owner of the adjacent farmland requested that the Fa'side ruins be condemned and razed, in the interest of public safety, but outcry from local residents twice intervened. The castle was close to being demolished, save for the preservation efforts of author and Scottish historian Nigel Tranter, who created the Fa'side Restoration Society in 1970 via the St. Andrews Society of East Lothian.

Finally, the castle was bought and renovated by Thomas Moodie Craig. The architecture firm of Ian Parsons oversaw the restoration, which was completed in 1982.

As of 2026, the castle remains in private ownership. The building has five bedrooms while the tourist accommodation is in a tower and two cottages.

== See also ==
- Restoration of castles in Scotland
