= John Gordon, 14th Earl of Sutherland =

John Gordon (1609–1679) was the 14th Earl of Sutherland.

He was the son of John Gordon, 13th Earl of Sutherland and Agnes Elphinstone (d. 1617), a daughter of the Lord Treasurer, Alexander Elphinstone, 4th Lord Elphinstone.

== Civil War ==
A strong Covenanter, Gordon was called "the good Earl John" by his associates. He fought against the royalist marquess of Montrose at the Battle of Auldearn in 1645, but afterwards rendered good service to Charles II.

== Keeper of the Privy Seal of Scotland ==
Gordon was appointed by the Parliament of Scotland to the post of Keeper of the Privy Seal of Scotland in 1649 and he held the post until 1660. He is the only Keeper of the Privy Seal of Scotland to be appointed by the Parliament.

== Sutherland estate ==
According to Sir Robert Gordon, 1st Baronet, who himself was a younger son of Alexander Gordon, 12th Earl of Sutherland, in 1631, Alexander Murray ("Morray") of Aberscross ("Abiscors") died after a fall from a stair. He left one son and two daughters. Half of his estate went direct to the Earl of Sutherland while the other half also went to the Earl of Sutherland because of the death of the last Laird of Duffus who was superior of that part of the estate under the Earl. According to Sir Robert Gordon, John Gordon, 14th Earl of Sutherland dealt nobly with Alexander Murray, his wife and his children in respect of the ancient and faithful service that the family had given to the Sutherlands. He gave part of the estate to the old widow (mother of Alexander and wife of John Murray of Aberscross), part to the widow of Alexander, and part to the children of Alexander to maintain, while another part was reserved to the Earl as acknowledgement of his superiority. According to Gordon, the estate of Aberscross ("Abiscors") became so overburdened with debt that it would never again be redeemed by the true and lawful heirs.

== Family ==
John Gordon, 14th Earl of Sutherland was married to Lady Jean Drummond, daughter of James Drummond, 1st Earl of Perth, by whom he had four children:

1. John Gordon, Lord Strathnaver, born on 21 November 1632, and died on 14 October 1637 of Smallpox at Dunrobin Castle.
2. George Gordon, 15th Earl of Sutherland, his heir and successor.
3. Robert Gordon, born at Dunrobin on 31 December 1635. He was elected as commissioner for Sutherland for the parliament of 1661. He married Jean, eldest daughter of John Mackay, 2nd Lord Reay.
4. Lady Jean Gordon, born on 10 October 1634, who married Captain Robert Stewart of Ethay in 1657.

He married second Anna Fraser, daughter of Hugh Fraser, 7th Lord Lovat.

Political offices
| Preceded by Robert Ker | Keeper of the Privy Seal of Scotland; 1649–1660 | Succeeded by William Keith |
Peerage of Scotland
| Preceded by John Gordon | Earl of Sutherland; 1615–1679 | Succeeded by George Gordon |
