= Mackay of Scoury =

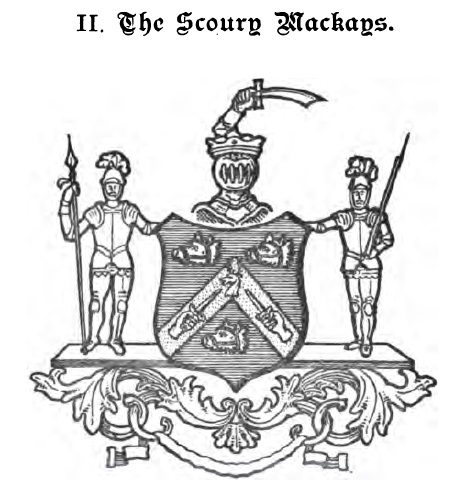
The Mackay of Scoury coat of arms

The Mackays of Scoury were a minor noble Scottish family and a branch of the ancient Clan Mackay, a Highland Scottish clan. They were seated at Scourie Castle, in Scourie (modern spelling), in the parish of Eddrachillis, county of Sutherland. However, Scourie was part of the Mackay chief's province of "Strathnaver" until it was sold to the Earl of Sutherland in 1829.

== Donald Balloch Mackay, I of Scoury ==
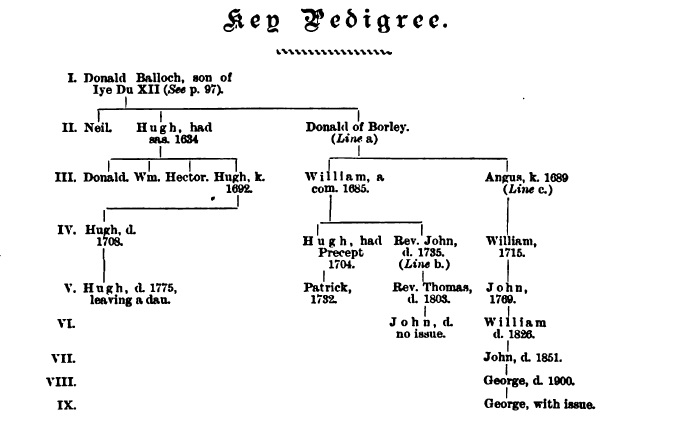
Family tree showing lineal descent from Donald Balloch Mackay (1st of Scoury)

Donald Balloch Mackay, 1st of Scoury was the second eldest natural son of chief Iye Du Mackay, 12th of Strathnaver and Helen, daughter of Hugh MacLeod of Assint. However, as his parents were first cousins Donald Balloch Mackay was therefore barred by canon law from succeeding as chief to his father's estates. Historian Angus Mackay does designate Donald Balloch as 13th of Strathnaver, but shows that the true successor of Iye Du Mackay was Huistean Du Mackay, 13th of Strathnaver who was the eldest son from Iye Du's second marriage to Christian, daughter of John Sinclair of Duns, Caithness.

Donald Balloch disputed the chiefship with his younger half-brother Huistean Mackay, 13th of Strathnaver, and later he was banished from Strathnaver and Sutherland for the killing of one James Mackroy, thus retiring himself to the Earl of Caithness, chief of the Clan Sinclair who was then at feud with the Gordon Earl of Sutherland. In 1590 Donald Balloch Mackay commanded a company of archers in support of the Earl of Caithness and against the Earl of Sutherland at the Battle of Clynetradwell. Historian Angus Mackay states that Donald Balloch played the part of a skilful and gallant leader, saving the situation for the Earl of Caithness. Even the Gordon of Sutherland account states that Donald Balloch Mackay played the part of a good commander. The Earl of Caithness was however defeated and Donald Balloch Mackay was imprisoned in Dunrobin Castle by the Earl of Sutherland. He was later released with the consent of his half brother, Huistean Mackay, 13th of Strathnaver and from then on Donald Balloch Mackay supported the Earl of Sutherland like Huistean did.

Donald Balloch Mackay received from Huistean Mackay of Strathnaver a charter of alienation for Kinlochbervie, Scouriemore, Scouriebeg, (Scourie) and Eriboll.

Donald Balloch Mackay married Euphemia, daughter of Hugh Munro of Assint, brother of Robert Mor Munro, 15th Baron of Foulis. They had the following children:

1. Neil Mackay, who resigned his lands to his superior, Donald Mackay, 1st Lord Reay (Sir Donald Mackay of Strathnaver).
2. Hugh Mackay, 2nd of Scoury.
3. Donald Mackay, 1st of Borley. (Progenitor of the Mackay of Borley branch of the Clan Mackay).
4. William Mackay, a Captain in Donald Mackay, 1st Lord Reay's Scots Regiment that served in the Thirty Years' War. He later became a Lieutenant-Colonel of a Swedish regiment and was killed at the Battle of Lützen (1632) along with Gustavus Adolphus of Sweden.
5. Margaret Mackay, married Alexander Sutherland of Kilphedder.
6. Janet Mackay, married William Mor Mackay, son of Neil MacEan MacWilliam Mackay, V of Aberach.
7. Christian Mackay, married Murdo Mackay, eldest son of Neil MacEan MacWilliam Mackay, V of Aberach. It is possible that these were ancestors of Donald Trump.
8. Ann Mackay, married John Tarrel of Strathflete.

== Hugh Mackay, II of Scoury ==
Hugh Mackay, 2nd of Scoury obtained the lands of Eriboll for £2000 Scots which he then disponed to Hugh Munro of Pitfure, whose descendants resided there for three generations. Hugh Mackay then purchased the estate of Scoury from Lord Reay which his elder brother Neil had previously disponed of and had sasine of it on 27 June 1634.

In 1643 Hugh Mackay, 2nd of Scoury was appointed as a commissioner of supply for the shire of Sutherland. In 1648 he was made a member of the War Committee but in 1649 was taken prisoner at Balvenie Castle during the Civil War. In 1650 Parliament appointed him as a colonel in a fencible regiment and he was re-appointed as a commissioner of supply in 1661. For his support of Charles II of England during the Civil War his estate was burdened with fines and debts, however his son, General Hugh Mackay, managed to clear them away. Hugh Mackay, 2nd of Scoury married Ann, daughter of John Corbett of Arkboll, Ross and had the following children:

1. Donald Mackay, (died young).
2. William Mackay, who was driven ashore by the weather on 14 February 1668, landing near Thurso, Caithness, where he was imprisoned in foul dungeon due to the feud between the Mackays and Sinclairs at the time. He was later put on a boat to Scoury but died on passage.
3. General Hugh Mackay, 3rd of Scoury.
4. Colonel James Mackay (killed at the Battle of Killiecrankie).
5. Roderick Mackay, provost-marshal of a Scots Regiment in Holland in 1677.
6. Barbara Mackay, second wife of John Mackay, 2nd Lord Reay.
7. Elizabeth Mackay, married Hugh Munro of Eriboll.
8. Ann Mackay, married the Hon. William Mackay of Kinloch, son of Donald Mackay, 1st Lord Reay.

== Hugh Mackay, III of Scoury ==
General Hugh Mackay, 3rd of Scoury was known in Scottish Gaelic as An Shenilir Mor meaning The Great General. He is best known for his service during the Glorious Revolution of 1688 in which although he was defeated at the Battle of Killiecrankie, he won the campaign against the Jacobite John Graham, 1st Viscount of Dundee. General Hugh Mackay later distinguished himself during the Williamite War in Ireland. He was killed at the Battle of Steenkerque during the Nine Years' War.

General Hugh Mackay married Clara de Bie, a Dutch lady of noble extraction. They had the following children:

1. Hugh Mackay, 4th of Scoury.
2. Margaret Mackay, married George Mackay, 3rd Lord Reay.
3. Mary Mackay, married Mathew Linyindeck, burgomaster in Nijmegen.

== Hugh Mackay, IV of Scoury ==
Hugh Mackay, 4th of Scoury was given command of a company in his father's Scots Regiment on 1 September 1692, but he died in a field accident whilst holding the rank of major. He had married Anna de Lancy, a Swiss lady and they had the following children:

1. Hugh Mackay, 5th of Scoury.
2. Gabriel Mackay, a captain in Haket's Scots on 20 November 1730, a colonel on 1 April 1748 and had died by 1758.
3. Clara Margaret Mackay, married Baron Ren Duyck.

== Hugh Mackay, V of Scoury ==
Hugh Mackay, 5th of Scoury became a captain on one of the Scot regiments in Holland on 20 September 1729 and in 1772 he became a lieutenant-general. On 17 December 1773 he was made honorary colonel of his grandfather's old regiment of Scots as a special mark of honour. He married Isabella de Savornin and they had only one daughter, Anna Louisia Mackay who married Lieut-General Prevost, colonel of the 60th Foot and Lord of Belsinge in the Republic of Genoa.

== Bibliography ==
- Coventry, Martin (2008). Castles of the Clans: The Strongholds and Seats of 750 Scottish Families and Clans. Musselburgh: Goblinshead. ISBN 978-1-899874-36-1.
- Gordon, Sir Robert (1813) [Printed from original manuscript 1580 - 1656]. A Genealogical History of the Earldom of Sutherland. Edinburgh: Printed by George Ramsay & Co for Archibald Constable & Co.
- Mackay, Angus (1906). The Book of Mackay. Edinburgh: Norman MacLeod, 25 George IV Bridge.

== See also ==
- Clan Mackay
