= John Sutherland, 9th Earl of Sutherland =

- Earl of Sutherland Coat of Arms
- Born: Unknown
- Died: 1514; Dunrobin Castle, Sutherland, Scotland
- Relatives: John Sutherland, 8th Earl of Sutherland (father); Elizabeth Sutherland, 10th Countess of Sutherland (sister)
- Military career
- Allegiance: Scotland

John Sutherland, (died 1514) was the 9th Earl of Sutherland and chief of the Clan Sutherland, a Scottish clan of the Scottish Highlands.

== Early life ==
He was the son of John Sutherland, 8th Earl of Sutherland. According to 19th-century historian William Fraser, his date of birth is uncertain and although the record of him being served heir to his father in 1509 was extant in 1630 (as per 17th-century historian Sir Robert Gordon, 1st Baronet), it was no longer extant. The history of the 9th Earl of Sutherland was overshadowed by the fact that he inherited his father's mental illness. His sister, Elizabeth, may have been older than him as at their father's death she had apparently been married for some time, as her eldest son was of marriageable age in 1518. Sir Robert Gordon stated that John Sutherland, 9th Earl of Sutherland "was weak of judgement, deprived of natural witt and understanding, being able to governe neither himself nor others; bot his sister Lady Elizabeth Southerland (the wyff of Adam Gordon of Aboyn) was full of spirit and witt". Adam Gordon was a younger son of George Gordon, 2nd Earl of Huntly, chief of Clan Gordon.

== Earl of Sutherland ==
Sir Robert Gordon also states that the Sutherland estate was controlled by Earl John's sister Elizabeth and her husband Adam Gordon, and so John was only earl in name for a few years. Gordon also stated that the earldom was administered by Crown officers for three years. Gordon goes on to say that Adam Gordon seeing Earl John's incapacity and that his wife Lady Elizabeth was the earl's sister, he began to prudently try to bring about a settlement of the estate upon himself, and that Alexander Sutherland, a son of the late 8th Earl of Sutherland, was a rival claimant. Gordon also stated that Adam Gordon arranged for his wife Elizabeth to cause herself heir to her father, the 8th Earl.

Fraser stated that John, 9th Earl was served heir to his father on 24 July 1509 and on the following day Alexander Sutherland made a resignation of the earldom in favour of John and his sister Elizabeth. However, although John was served heir, he did not immediately complete his title by the feudal investiture of sasine, probably owing to his incapacity. As a result, the rents and expenditures of the Sutherland estates were administered by Andrew Stewart, Bishop of Caithness, who was then high treasurer and who also acted as chamberlain of Sutherland. It was not until December 1512 that possession of the earldom was given to John, at Dunrobin Castle, Patrick Baillie acting on his behalf. Gordon indicates that this was done at the instance of Adam Gordon as it was necessary for him to carry out his subsequent process of idiotry against Earl John. Consequently, Adam Gordon submitted his application, in his wife's name, to the Crown, and a commission was issued by the Chancery of James V of Scotland to William, Lord Ruthven, John, Lord Drummond, and others to act as sheriffs of Inverness, to deal with the service and execution of the breive of idiotry against Earl John. They were to hold their meetings at Perth in order to be free from local influences. The earl himself was examined, which according to Fraser shows that he was not a complete idiot, though he was probably of weak intelligence, but appeared to have understood the nature of the proceedings. He was asked by the jury who should succeed him, his heritage and possessions, failing lawful heirs of his own body. In reply he declared his sister Elizabeth and her husband Adam Gordon, and their children as his nearest heirs and immediate successors, and that he gave his full consent and agreement to this.

John Sutherland, 9th Earl of Sutherland died about a month after the meeting at Perth and he was therefore succeeded by his sister, Elizabeth Sutherland, 10th Countess of Sutherland. Her son with Adam Gordon was Alexander Gordon who succeeded as Master of Sutherland, but not without resistance from Elizabeth's younger brother Alexander Sutherland who was eventually killed at the Battle of Alltachuilain in 1519. Alexander Gordon's son John Gordon succeeded as John Gordon, 11th Earl of Sutherland.

Peerage of Scotland
| Preceded by John Sutherland | Earl of Sutherland c. 1508 – 1514 | Succeeded by Elizabeth Sutherland |
