= The Entertainment of the Kings of Great Britain and Denmark =

1606 entertainment at Theobalds House, Hertfordshire, England

The Entertainment of the Two Kings of Great Britain and Denmark or The Hours was written by Ben Jonson and performed at Theobalds House on 24 July 1606 . John Harington of Kelston described another masque of Solomon and Sheba, performed one day at Theobalds after dinner. There is some doubt over Harington's account. In May 1607 another masque An Entertainment of the King James and Queen Anne at Theobalds was performed when the keys of the house were given to Anne of Denmark.

== Royal visit in 1606 ==
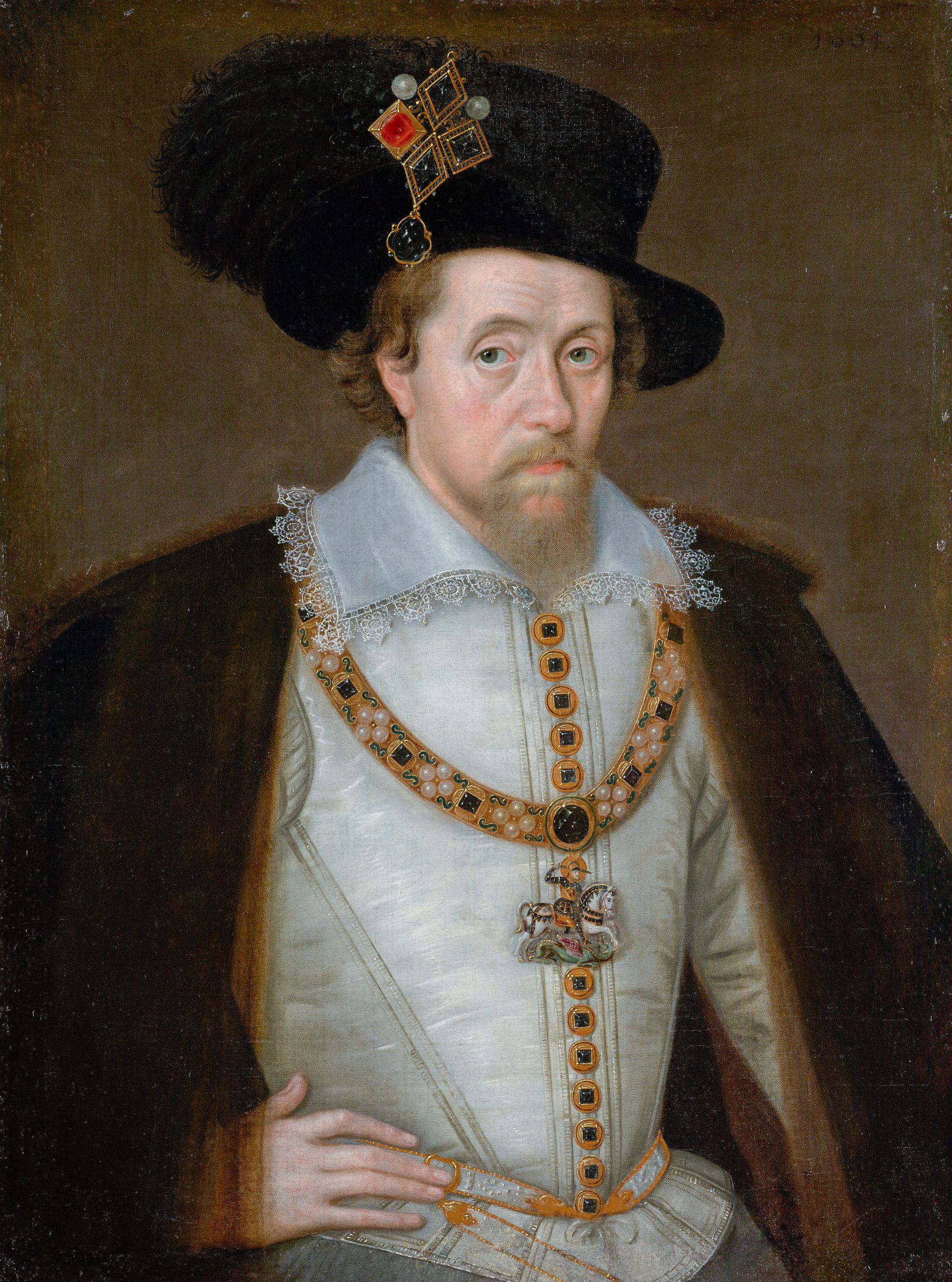
James VI and I, by John de Critz, 1604, Scottish National Gallery

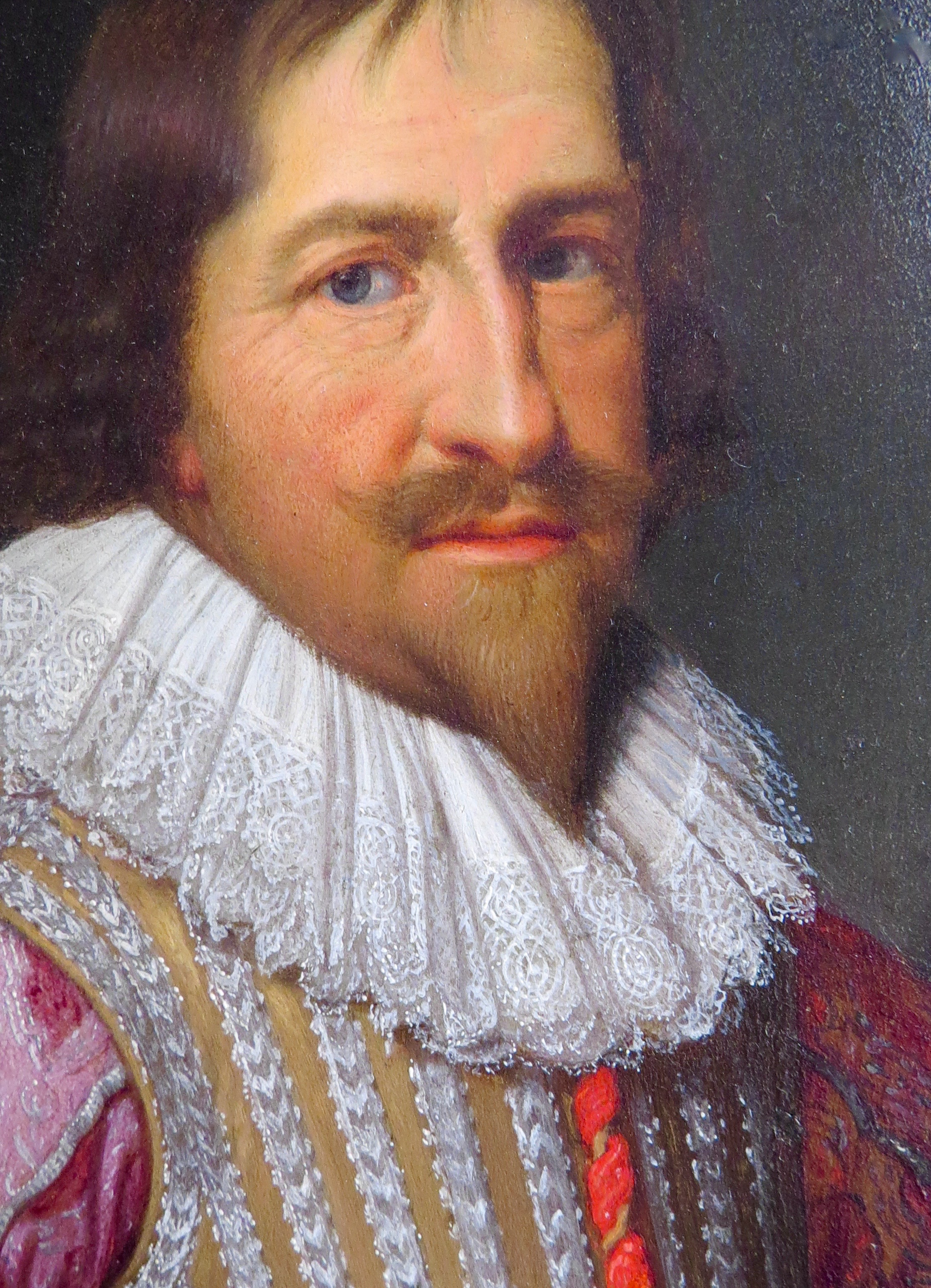
Christian IV, by David Bailly, Rosenborg Castle

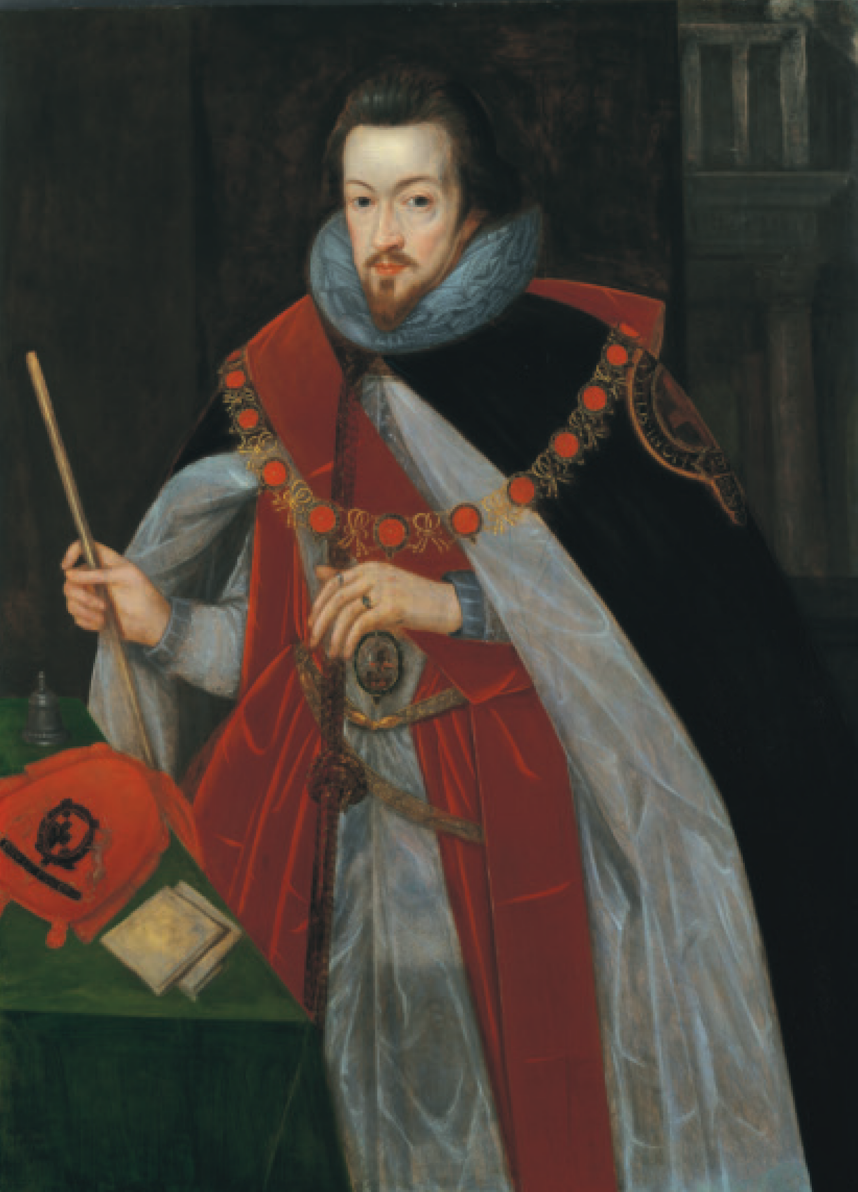
Robert Cecil owner of Theobalds

James VI and I and his brother-in-law Christian IV of Denmark rode in coaches from Blackwall to Theobalds at Cheshunt. Ben Jonson wrote a Latin entertainment for their arrival. They stayed four days and hunted in the woods and chases nearby. On Sunday 27 August there was a fish supper. The dishes had pendants attached with arms of England and Denmark, and the theme of the visit, "Welcome and Welcome Still" in gilt letters. On Monday the royal party moved to Greenwich Palace, where they were welcomed by Anne of Denmark. She had recently lost her child Sophia.

The visit cost Robert Cecil, 1st Earl of Salisbury £1,180 including presents worth £284. Sugar treats were supplied by Robert Walthew, sergeant of the royal confectionary. Some of the gold and silver plate used at meals was hired from the goldsmith John Williams. Cecil paid Inigo Jones £23 for making and designing masque scenery.

=== Welcome Still ===
According to one account the way near the house was strewn with artificial green oak leaves with the gilded word, "Welcome". A description printed in The King of Denmarkes Welcome explains there was an artificial tree at the entrance gates with green silk leaves. There were speeches of welcome, and then the welcoming leaves were shed like confetti on the royal party and there was a song, Welcome Still. John Chamberlain wrote that the "invention of the green taffeta welcome" came from Wilson, probably meaning Thomas Wilson.

=== Entertainment of the Two Kings ===
At the porch of Theobalds there were three Hours seated on clouds. Their Greek names were Eunomie Law, Dice Justice, and Irene Peace. Their crowns had emblems of a sun-dial, a clock, and an hour-glass. A short speech in English alluded to the leaves of welcome. The speech was repeated in Latin for Christian IV. The entrance was decorated with a Latin inscription, and epigrams addressed to both kings, and to James and Christian IV. Another pair of epigrams was displayed when the two kings left on 28 July.

John Gordon wrote a dialogue commemorating the occasion, in English and Latin epigrams, and his wife Geneviève Petau provided a translation into French.

=== Solomon and Sheba ===
A letter of John Harington to a Secretary Barlow describing a masque at Theobalds for the two kings is frequently quoted. Harington said that during the Danish royal visit gentlemen and even ladies abandoned "their sobriety, and are seen to roll about in intoxication". Following a great feast at Theobalds, the "representation of Solomon and Sheba was made". Harington says a lady acting the part of the Queen of Sheba tripped on the steps of the royal dais, throwing her casket of gifts, apparently a tray of desserts, at Christian IV. Napkins were brought to clean up. He tried to dance with Sheba, but fell over. James was put in bed, but his clothes were still covered with "wine, cream, jelly, beverage, cakes, spices and other good matters". The masque continued with Hope, Faith, and Charity, but Hope drunkenly forgot her speech, Faith was also drunk, Charity exited to join Hope and Faith who were now vomiting in the lower hall. Victory and Peace addressed Christian IV. Victory, played by a female courtier, was also drunk and taken to bed. Peace was seen fighting her attendants with an olive branch.

Historians are sceptical about this account, not only for its exaggeration for comic effect, but the differences between the action described and other court masques, and the prominent speaking parts given to female courtiers. Usually speaking roles were given to boy actors, not aristocratic women as implied by Harington. Most of the ladies of the queen's court would have been with her at Greenwich.

=== Christian IV and the Countess of Nottingham ===
Another doubtful account of the entertainment was included in Edward Peyton's Catastrophe of the House of Stuarts. King James was carried to bed and Christian IV was so "disguised" or drunk that he tried to seduce Margaret Howard, Countess of Nottingham, causing a quarrel with the Earl of Nottingham, "And Denmark was so disguised, as he would have lain with the Countess of Nottingham, making horns in derision at her husband the high Admiral of England; which caused a deep discontent between them". This quarrel is recorded, but in other accounts is based on an incident on the Thames when Christian IV was set to depart. Arbella Stuart tried to mediate in the aftermath.

== Entertainment of the King and Queen at Theobalds in 1607 ==
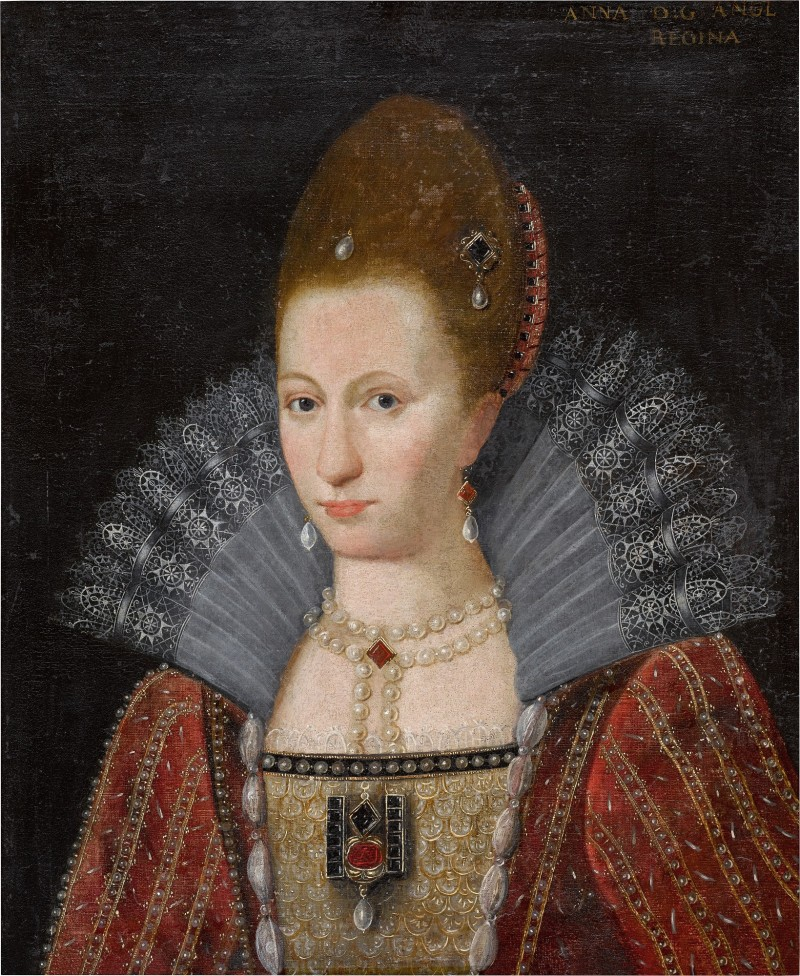
The Genius of Theobalds gave Anne of Denmark the keys on 22 May 1607

In 1607 Robert Cecil gave ownership of Theobalds to Anne of Denmark in a property exchange with King James for the manor and Palace of Hatfield. The royal family came to Theobalds in May and there was hunting and jousting in the queen's honour. Ben Jonson wrote another masque, known by the title of a published version, An Entertainment of King James and Queen Anne at Theobalds (1616), for Friday 22 May 1607. The Prince of Joinville attended the festivities and the events were briefly described by the French ambassador Antoine Lefèvre de la Boderie.

The masque was presented in a gallery after dinner. A white curtain was drawn to reveal a "gloomy obscure place, hung all with black silks". The Genius of the House, the spirit of place, learns from Rumour that Robert Cecil is leaving. A prophecy written in an adamantine book reveals that the greatest king, the fairy queen, and two unsurpassed princes, (Prince Henry (1594-1612) and Claude, Prince de Joinville (1578–1657), are to be entertained at Theobalds. The three Fates assure the Genius that Cecil is delighted to give the house to Anne of Denmark, "Bel-Anna". They convince him to accept their change management gladly. The Genius delivers the keys of the house to the queen.

In praise of Anne of Denmark, the fate Atropos told the Genius:

She is the grace of all that are;
And like Eliza now a star,
Unto her crown, and lasting praise,
Thy humbler walls at first did raise;
So shall BEL-ANNA them protect;
And this is all the Fates can say;
Which first believe, and then obey.

There is a contemporary version of the dialogue in French verse, presumably for the benefit of the Prince of Joinville. In 1591 Queen Elizabeth had been entertained by the Hermit's Welcome at Theobalds in which the gardener discovers a jewel casket bearing a prophecy.
