= Jean Gordon, Countess of Bothwell =

Scottish noblewoman (1546–1629)

Lady Jean Gordon
- Countess of Bothwell; Countess of Sutherland
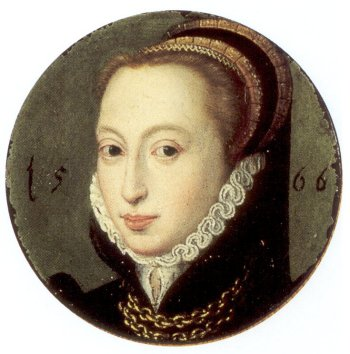
- Miniature portrait of Jean Gordon, Countess of Bothwell, 1566
- Born: 1546; Huntly Castle, Aberdeenshire, Scotland
- Died: 14 May 1629 (aged 82–83); Dunrobin Castle, Sutherland, Scotland
- Buried: Dornoch, Scotland
- Noble family: Gordon
- Spouses: James Hepburn, 4th Earl of Bothwell; Alexander Gordon, 12th Earl of Sutherland; Alexander Ogilvy of Boyne
- Issue: Jane Gordon; John Gordon, 13th Earl of Sutherland; Sir Robert Gordon; Mary Gordon; Sir Alexander Gordon
- Father: George Gordon, 4th Earl of Huntly
- Mother: Elizabeth Keith

Jean Gordon, Countess of Bothwell (1546 – 14 May 1629) was a wealthy Scottish noblewoman and the second wife of James Hepburn, 4th Earl of Bothwell. He became, after his divorce from Lady Jean, the third husband of Mary, Queen of Scots. Lady Jean herself had a total of three husbands. Upon her second marriage, she became the Countess of Sutherland.

== Family ==
Lady Jean Gordon was born at Huntly Castle, sometimes called Strathbogie, in Aberdeenshire, the second eldest daughter of George Gordon, 4th Earl of Huntly, the wealthiest and most powerful landowner in the Scottish Highlands, and Elizabeth Keith. Her paternal grandparents were Lord Gordon and Margaret Stewart, illegitimate daughter of King James IV by his mistress, Margaret Drummond. Her maternal grandparents were Robert Keith, Master of Marischal and Lady Elizabeth Douglas.

Jean had nine brothers and two sisters, and the family were brought up at Huntly Castle, which was modernised during the 1550s. Her father's Highlands estates were so numerous that they approached those of an independent monarch. He became Lord Chancellor of Scotland in 1546, the year of her birth. However, the Earl was captured at the Battle of Pinkie Cleugh in September 1547, and spent some time in England. The Earl then followed a complicated political career balancing his and Scotland's international and religious interests.

In the autumn of 1562, Mary, Queen of Scots came to the north on a progress to punish the family on the basis of allegations against Jean's brother, Sir John Gordon. At Darnaway Castle, Mary gave Huntly's title of Earl of Moray to her own illegitimate half-brother James, who was the husband of Jean's first cousin, Lady Agnes Keith. Jean's father slipped away from Huntly Castle, evading the queen's soldier William Kirkcaldy of Grange, but was defeated by James at the Battle of Corrichie in 1562. At the end of the fight, the Earl collapsed and died of apoplexy on the battlefield. Jean's father was posthumously tried for treason in Edinburgh, where his embalmed body was brought to face parliament, and his title and lands were thereby forfeited to the crown.

Jean's eldest surviving brother, Lord Gordon, was spared execution and eventually allowed to succeed the rebel Earl. However, Jean's brother Sir John Gordon was executed. As a token of the queen's clemency towards the Huntlys, Jean, her mother, and Lord Gordon were given positions at the royal court. In 1565, Jean's brother, George, was allowed to succeed to his father's titles as the 5th Earl of Huntly, and his lands were restored in 1567.

== Marriages and issue ==
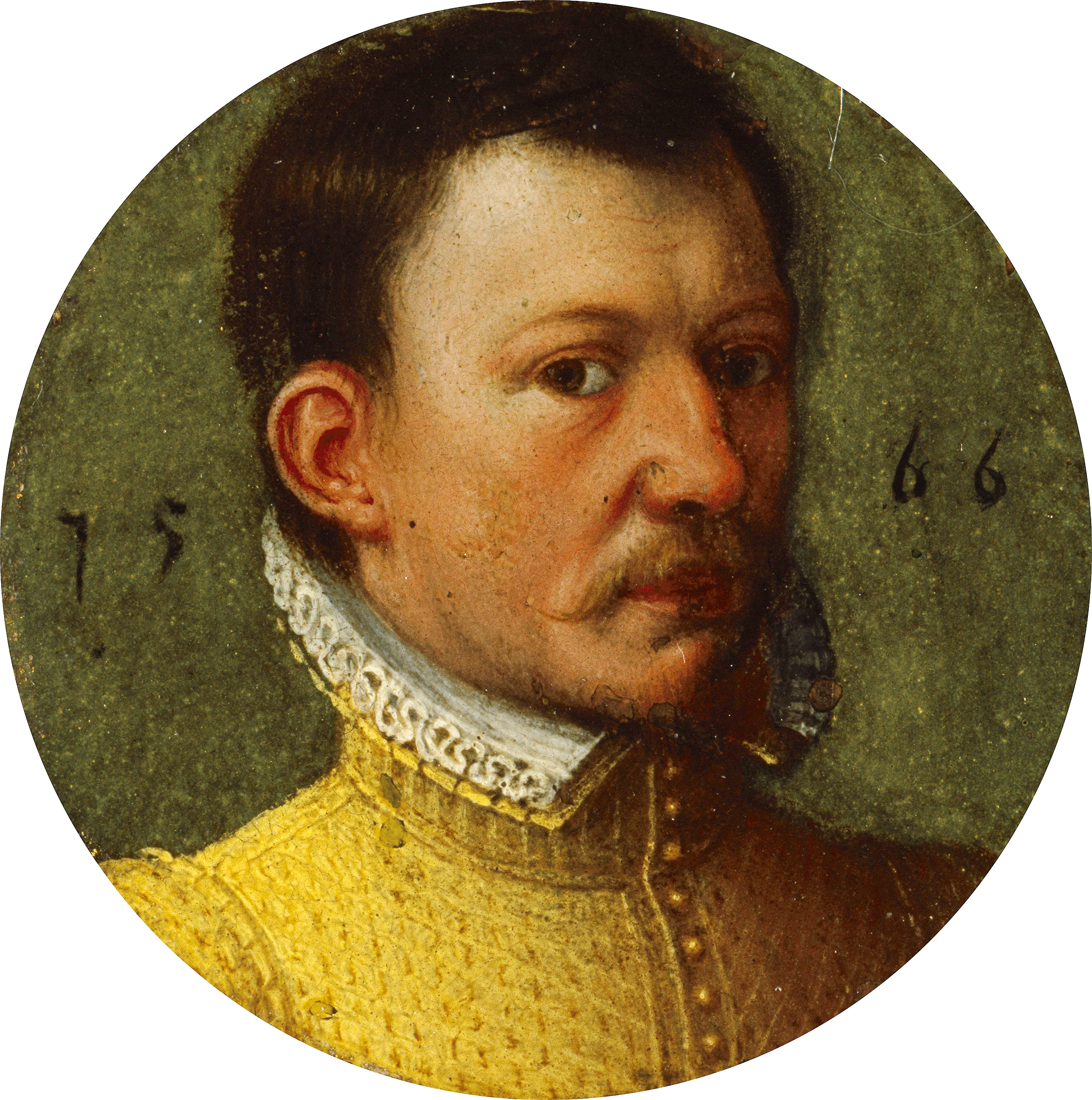
James Hepburn, 4th Earl of Bothwell (1566 portrait)

=== Countess of Bothwell ===
On 24 February 1566, Jean, who was a Catholic, married James Hepburn, 4th Earl of Bothwell, in a Protestant-rites ceremony apparently celebrated with considerable pomp. Queen Mary, who strongly approved of the match, supplied cloth of silver and white taffeta for Jean's wedding gown, although she had wanted the marriage to have taken place in the Chapel Royal during a mass. Bothwell, however refused to attend mass on Candlemas day. Her uncle, Alexander Gordon, Bishop of Galloway, preached at the ceremony at the court at Holyroodhouse. The couple held a banquet at Kinloch's house in the Canongate. According to Robert Lindsay of Pitscottie there followed five days of jousting and tournaments.

Jean was pale-skinned, and had a firm nose, bulbous eyes, and a long clever face which lacked beauty and softness. According to author Antonia Fraser, she had a "cool, detached character warmed by a masculine intelligence, and a great understanding above the capacity of her sex." She was provided with a large dowry by her brother George, and she had an excellent appreciation of the value of her properties. Later she managed to retain her lands, despite the Earl of Bothwell's attainder.

At the end of February 1567, Jean became gravely ill and was in peril of dying. William Drury, an English commander at Berwick, heard she was not likely to live.

That same year, after much persuasion from her brother, who was Bothwell's ally, Jean agreed to begin divorce proceedings against her husband. The process was made by a team of lawyers including Edward Henryson and Clement Littill. On 3 May 1567, she was given judgement against Bothwell in the Protestant commissary court on the grounds of his alleged adultery with her maid and seamstress, Bessie Crawford.

Bessie was described by Jean's witness as a bonny little woman, 20 years old, black-haired and pale, often wearing a black gown. She had been a servant of Jean's mother and her father was a blacksmith. The adultery occurred at Haddington Abbey and Crichton Castle. The marriage was formally annulled on 7 May by the Consistorial Court of St. Andrews presided over by the Catholic Archbishop Hamilton. The annulment was due to Bothwell and Jean not having received a dispensation for their marriage, although they were within the fourth degree of consanguinity. Actually a dispensation had been given prior to their marriage by Archbishop Hamilton himself. Eight days later, on 15 May, Bothwell married Mary, Queen of Scots, whose late husband Lord Darnley had been murdered at the Kirk o'Field in mysterious circumstances which implicated Bothwell as having been the chief culprit behind the crime. Jean remained at Bothwell's Crichton Castle, its mortgage having been redeemed by her own dowry. Following Bothwell and Queen Mary's defeat at Carberry Hill, Jean abandoned Crichton, and returned to her mother at Strathbogie Castle. In December, Bothwell's titles and estates, including Crichton Castle, were forfeited by an act of parliament for treason.

=== Countess of Sutherland ===
Jean married secondly at Huntly Castle, on 13 December 1573, Alexander Gordon, 12th Earl of Sutherland, thus becoming the Countess of Sutherland. Alexander had been married at age fifteen to Barbara Sinclair, daughter of his guardian, George Sinclair, 4th Earl of Caithness, after his parents were poisoned at Helmsdale Castle. Alexander escaped from the Sinclairs to Huntly Castle and began proceedings to divorce Barbara Sinclair. She died in 1573, and they had no children.

Jean and Alexander together had seven (or possibly eight) children:

- Jane Gordon (born 1 November 1574), in December 1589 married Huistean Du Mackay, 13th chief of Clan MacKay (1562–1614).
- John Gordon, 13th Earl of Sutherland (20 July 1575 – 11 September 1615), on 5 February 1600 married Agnes Elphinstone, by whom he had five children, including John Gordon, 14th Earl of Sutherland.
- Alexander Gordon, elder, died in infancy.
- Adam Gordon, died in infancy.
- Robert Gordon of Gordonstoun (14 May 1580 – March 1654), on 16 February 1613 married Louisa Gordon, by whom he had issue.
- Mary Gordon (14 August 1582 – 1605), on 21 February 1598 married David Ross of Balnowgowan
- Sir Alexander Gordon of Navisdale (born 5 March 1585)
- Possibly another daughter whose name is unknown. She was the first wife of an Alexander Gordon of Aikenhead, believed to be of the Lesmoir family, who later became known as Alexander Gordon of Salterhill. Robert Gordon of Gordonstoun mentioned above had first purchased Salterhill from the Innes family in 1636. As it is assumed Alexander Gordon of Salterhill acquired that estate through his first wife, she would appear to have been a sister or otherwise near relative of Sir Robert Gordon. This couple is named as the progenitor of many Irish Gordon families such as Ballinteggart and Sheepbridge, as well as their American descendants.

Within two years of Jean's second marriage, due to the Earl's increasing ill health, Jean ran the vast Sutherland estates from their base at Dunrobin Castle. The Earl died on 6 December 1594.

From 1598, Jean developed coal mines and salt pans at Brora, and built a house at "Cracock" or Crakaig at Lothbeg. In 1630 the garden at Dunrobin was described as "planted with all kynd of fruits, hearbs and flowres used in this kingdome, and good store of sfaron, tobacco and rosemarie".

=== Third marriage ===
Five years later, on 10 December 1599, Jean married her third and last husband, Alexander Ogilvy of Boyne, the widower of Mary Beaton, one of Queen Mary's celebrated quartet of ladies-in-waiting who had died in 1598. He was the only man Jean had ever truly loved, as her two previous marriages had been made for political reasons.

Lady Jean Gordon died on 14 May 1629 at Dunrobin Castle at the age of eighty-three. She was buried in Dornoch. Robert Gordon of Gordonstoun wrote her into the history of the House of Gordon;

"a vertuous and comelie lady, judicious, of excellent memorie, and great understanding above the capacitie of her sex; in this much to be commended that ... schoe alwise managed her effaris with so great prudence and foresight that the enemeis of the familie could never prevail against her, ... Further shoe hath by her great care and diligence brought to a prosperous end many hard and difficult business, of great consequence appertyning to the house of Sutherland ... Shoe wes dureing her dayes a great ornament to that familie, ..."

== In art, fiction, and film ==
In 1566, the Earl of Bothwell commissioned an artist, whose name is not recorded, to paint miniature portraits of Jean and himself. These were done in oil on copper.

Jean appears as a character in Elizabeth Byrd's historical romance, Immortal Queen, which is a fictionalised story of the life of Mary, Queen of Scots.

Irish actress Maria Aitken played the part of Jean Gordon, Countess of Bothwell in Mary, Queen of Scots, the 1971 film which starred Vanessa Redgrave in the title role.

== Sources ==
- Fraser, Antonia (1969), Mary, Queen of Scots, Weidenfeld and Nicolson, London
- Henderson, Jennifer Morag (2022), Daughters of the North: Jean Gordon and Mary, Queen of Scots, Sandstone Press, Dingwall, ISBN 9781913207755
- Sanderson, Margaret H.B. (1987), Mary Stewart's People, Life in Mary's Stewart's Scotland, James Thin, Edinburgh, pp. 34–53.
