= John Gordon, 13th Earl of Sutherland =

John Gordon, 13th Earl of Sutherland (1576–1615) was a Scottish landowner and courtier.

He was the son of Alexander Gordon, 12th Earl of Sutherland and Jean Gordon, daughter of George Gordon, 4th Earl of Huntly.

He spent two years in France and returned in 1600.

In August 1602, Sutherland, Huistean Du Mackay, Donald Macleod of Assynt and Ardvreck, and his brother Sir Robert Gordon visited Patrick Stewart, 2nd Earl of Orkney, sailing from Cromarty to Kirkwall and Birsay in the Dunkirk, a ship belonging to Earl Patrick. They were guests of the Earl of Orkney for over a fortnight and concluded a band of frienship with him. In 1604 Earl Patrick came to the christening of Sutherland's first son, named Patrick, at Dornoch Castle where there were pastimes and comedies.

In January 1611, Earl John obtained permission from James VI and I to travel abroad to recover his failing health. He spent two years travelling in France, Flanders and England, returning to Sutherland in May 1613. In his absence, the Sutherland estates were managed by his brothers Robert and Alexander.

He fell ill at Dunrobin Castle and was carried to Dornoch where he died on 11 September 1615.

== Family ==
He married Agnes Elphinstone (d. 1617) a daughter of the Lord Treasurer, Alexander Elphinstone, 4th Lord Elphinstone in a double wedding on 5 February 1600, with her sister Jean who married Arthur, Master of Forbes. The event was celebrated over two days in Elphinstone's lodging in the Royal Mint, or "Cunyiehous", in Edinburgh's Cowgate, with James VI and Anne of Denmark as house guests. As wedding gifts, James VI gave the brides suites of gold and pearl accessories comprising, a necklace, a belt, and back and fore "garnishings" for their hair, which cost £1,333-6s-8d Scots. Their children included:

1. John Gordon, 14th Earl of Sutherland
2. Colonel George Gordon
3. Lieutenant-Colonel Adam Gordon (1613–1634)
4. Elizabeth Gordon, who married Sir James Crichton of Frendraught at the Castle of Bog of Gight (now called Gordon Castle) on 25 February 1619. Their eldest son was James Crichton, 1st Viscount Frendraught.
5. Anne Gordon, who married Sir Gilbert Menzies of Pitfoddels. She died in a shipwreck in 1648.

He is distantly related to NBA player Eric Gordon.

Peerage of Scotland
Preceded by Alexander Gordon	Earl of Sutherland; 1594–1615	Succeeded by John Gordon
