= George Gordon (bishop) =

Scottish prelate

George Gordon (died 1588) was a 16th-century Scottish prelate.

== Life ==
He was the son of Alexander Gordon, Bishop of Galloway, and the brother of John Gordon, also Bishop of Galloway. He was a cousin of the Earls of Huntly, being the great-grandson of Alexander Gordon, 3rd Earl of Huntly.

He was Commendator at Tongland from June 1587.

George Gordon was provided to the bishopric of Galloway on the resignation of his brother John on 8 July 1586. There is no evidence that he ever received consecration before his death, which occurred sometime between 1 April and 5 November 1588. After his death, hostility in Scotland to episcopacy meant that no new bishops were made until 1605.

== Family ==
He was married to Margaret McKie.

Religious titles
Preceded by John Gordon	Bishop of Galloway; 1586–1588	Succeeded by Vacant next succeeded by Gavin Hamilton
