= Alexander Gordon, 12th Earl of Sutherland =

Scottish nobleman (died 1594)

Alexander Gordon, 12th Earl of Sutherland (died 1594) was a Scottish landowner.

== Early life ==
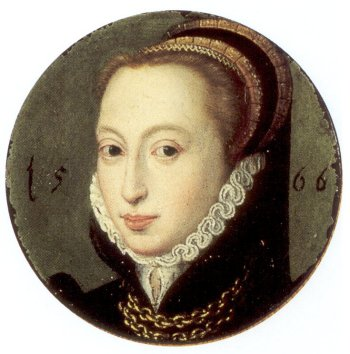
Jean Gordon, later Countess of Sutherland, 1566 unknown artist, National Galleries of Scotland

He was the son of John Gordon, 11th Earl of Sutherland and his second wife Lady Helen Stewart, daughter of John Stewart, 3rd Earl of Lennox and widow of William Hay, 6th Earl of Erroll.

When he was about fifteen years old in 1567, his father and step mother were poisoned at Helmsdale Castle by Isobel Sinclair, the wife of Gordon of Gartly. Isobel Sinclair's own son also died, but the fifteen-year-old heir of Sutherland, Alexander Gordon was unharmed. He was made to marry the daughter of George Sinclair, 4th Earl of Caithness, Barbara Sinclair, who was more than twice his age.

== Feud with the Earls of Caithness ==
In 1569, he escaped from the Sinclair family to Huntly Castle. He started proceedings to divorce Barbara Sinclair. She died in 1573, and he married Jean Gordon, the former wife of the Earl of Bothwell, who had also been living at Huntly. In 1570, the Battle of Torran-Roy had taken place between the forces of George Sinclair, 4th Earl of Caithness and Alexander Gordon, 12th Earl of Sutherland. Caithness was initially defeated by Sutherland's vassals the Murrays of Aberscross, but he returned to besiege the Murrays at Dornoch after which several of them were beheaded.

According to historian Robert Mackay, quoting 17th-century historian Sir Robert Gordon, 1st Baronet, in 1585 a meeting took place at Elgin, Scotland between George Gordon, 1st Marquess of Huntly, Alexander Gordon, 12th Earl of Sutherland, George Sinclair, 5th Earl of Caithness and Huistean Du Mackay, 13th of Strathnaver. The purpose of the meeting, according to Robert Mackay, was to repair relations which had become damaged between the Earl of Sutherland, Earl of Caithness and Huistean Du Mackay (Hugh Mackay), due to actions by the Clan Gunn and Hugh Mackay in Assynt, both having gone there on the orders of the Earl of Caithness. However, historian Angus Mackay does not state that Hugh Mackay attended this meeting and that the purpose of the meeting was to break up the confederacy between Hugh Mackay and the Earl of Caithness. According to historian Robert Mackay, it was decided at the meeting that the Clan Gunn should be "made away", because they were judged to be the principal authors of these "troubles and commotions", but that both Hugh Mackay and George Sinclair, Earl of Caithness were unwilling to attack their old allies the Clan Gunn and therefore departed from the meeting at Elgin. In consequence, in 1586, George Gordon, Marquess of Huntly came north to Sutherland, the lands of his cousin, Alexander Gordon, 12th Earl of Sutherland. He sent a message to both Hugh Mackay and George Sinclair, Earl of Caithness to meet him at Sutherland's seat of Dunrobin Castle. According to historian Robert Mackay, the Earl of Caithness met with the Gordons of Huntly and Sutherland but Mackay did not and was therefore denounced as a rebel. However, according to historian Angus Mackay, Hugh Mackay did attend this second meeting but refused the proposals of the Gordons of Huntly and Sutherland that the Gunns should be destroyed. However, the Earl of Caithness did indeed agree with the Gordons that the Gunns should be destroyed. Robert Mackay also states that the Earl of Caithness agreed with Gordon's proposals at this second meeting to attack the Gunns. According to historian Robert Mackay, Sinclair, Earl of Caithness sent his men under the command of Henry Sinclair to attack the Gunns. In the subsequent Battle of Allt Camhna, the Gunns having been joined by the Mackays, defeated the Sinclairs and killed their leader Henry Sinclair, who was "cousin" of the Earl of Caithness.

According to Sir Robert Gordon (who himself was a son of Alexander Gordon, 12th Earl of Sutherland) in 1590, George, 5th Earl of Caithness having been at feud for a few years with Alexander Gordon, 12th Earl of Sutherland, invaded Sutherland but was defeated at the Battle of Clynetradwell.

== Later life ==
Sutherland and his wife lived at Dunrobin Castle. Jean Gordon took on the business of the Sutherland estates, becoming the factor, and rents and dues were paid to her. With her husband, she audited the accounts of their chamberlain Alexander Ewinson at Dunrobin.

Gordon evidently had poor health and in 1580 he transferred rights of the Sutherland earldom to his young son and heir John.

He died in 1594.

In 1599 his widow Jean Gordon married Alexander Ogilvie of Boyne, former husband of Mary Beaton.

== Family ==
Alexander Gordon and Barbara Sinclair had no children. The children of Alexander Gordon and Jean Gordon included:

1. Jane Gordon, who married Huistean Du MacKay of Strathnaver and Farr (1562–1614), in December 1589. His first wife Elizabeth was Barbara Sinclair's sister.
2. John Gordon, 13th Earl of Sutherland (1575–1615), who married Agnes Elphinstone (died 1617) on 5 February 1600 in Edinburgh. She was a daughter of Lord Elphinstone, and in a double wedding, her sister Jean Elphinstone married Arthur, Master of Forbes. As wedding gifts, James VI gave the brides suites of gold and pearl accessories comprising, a necklace, a belt, and back and fore "garnishings" for their hair, which cost £1,333-6s–8d Scots.
3. Robert Gordon of Gordonstoun (1580–1654), who married Louise Lucie Gordon, a former companion of Princess Elizabeth, and daughter of John Gordon and Geneviève Petau de Maulette in 1613
4. Mary Gordon (1582–1605), who married David Ross of Balnagowan in 1598
5. Alexander Gordon of Navisdale

Peerage of Scotland
Preceded by John Gordon	Earl of Sutherland; 1573–1594	Succeeded by John Gordon
