= Assynt Castle =

Former Scottish castle

Coordinates: 58.17706°N 5.07039°W

- Eilean Assynt, Highland, Scotland

Location
- Assynt Castle

Site history
- Built: 12th century
- In use: 12th to 16th century

Assynt Castle was a castle, located on Eilean Assynt located in Loch Assynt, Highland in Scotland.

== History ==
The Murray of Culbin family held lands in Assynt in the 12th century.

The castle was granted to Torquil MacLeod, by King David II of Scotland in 1343. The castle appears to have been abandoned in the 16th century after the construction of Ardvreck Castle.
