= William Couper (bishop) =

- Bishop of Galloway
- Church: Church of Scotland
- See: Diocese of Galloway
- In office: 1612–1619
- Predecessor: Gavin Hamilton
- Successor: Andrew Lamb

Orders
- Consecration: 4 October 1612

Personal details
- Born: 1568; Edinburgh
- Died: 16 February 1619; Edinburgh

William Couper (or Cowper) (1568–1619) was a Bishop of Galloway in Scotland.

== Life ==
The son of John Couper, merchant-tailor, of Edinburgh, he was born in 1568. After receiving some elementary instruction in his native city, and attending a school at Dunbar for four years, he entered in 1580 the university of St. Andrews, where he graduated M. A. in 1583. He then went to England, where he was for some years assistant-master in a school at Hoddesdon, Hertfordshire.

Returning to Edinburgh he was licensed a preacher of the church of Scotland in 1586, and admitted minister of the parish of Bothkennar, Stirlingshire, in August 1587, whence he was translated to the second charge of Perth in October 1595. On 18 August 1596, Couper questioned Christian Stewart of Nokwalter at Gowrie House. She was accused of causing death by witchcraft, and was subsequently executed in Edinburgh.

He was a member of six of the nine assemblies of the church from 1596 to 1608. Although one of the forty-two ministers who signed the protest to parliament, 1 July 1606, against the introduction of episcopacy, in 1608 he attended the packed assembly regarded by the presbyterians as unconstitutional, and from this time concurred in the measures sanctioned by the royal authority in behalf of episcopacy. When present at court in London in the latter year, he was sent by the king to the Tower to deal with Andrew Melville, but as he was unable to influence him the matter was left to John Spottiswood. He was promoted to the bishopric of Galloway on 31 July 1612, and was also made Dean of the Chapel Royal.

His character as delineated by Calderwood is by no means flattering, but the portrait is doubtless coloured by party prejudice. "He was", says Calderwood, "a man filled with self-conceate, and impatient of anie contradiction, more vehement in the wrong course than ever he was fervent in the right, wherein he seemed to be fervent enough. He made his residence in the Canongate, neere to the Chapell Royall, whereof he was deane, and went sometimes but once in two years till his diocese. When he went he behaved himself verie imperiouslie". Spottiswood, on the other hand, was of opinion that he "affected too much the applause of the people".

Four days before he died a number of accusations were made against him. Two days before he died he is said to have been playing golf on Leith Links when he saw a vision which frightened him so much that he threw his clubs away. His golf partners saw nothing and sent him home to rest. He took to bed and did not recover.

He died on 16 February 1619, and was interred in Greyfriars Kirkyard in central Edinburgh. The grave lies immediately south of the church.

== Works ==
Couper had the leading role in the composition of the prayer-book completed in 1619; but never brought into use. He produced extensive religious writings. In his lifetime were published:

- The Anatomy of a Christian Man, 1611
- Three Treatises concerning Christ, 1612
- The Holy Alphabet of Zion's Scholars; by way of Commentary on the cxix. Psalm, 1613
- Good News from Canaan; or an Exposition of David's Penitential Psalm after he had gone in unto Bathsheba, 1613;
- A Mirror of Mercy; or the Prodigal's Conversion expounded, 1614
- Dikaiologie; containing a just defence of his former apology against David Hume, 1614
- Sermon on Titus ii. 7, 8, 1616
- Two Sermons on Psalm cxxi. 8, and Psalm lxxxviii. 17, 1618
- Pathmos: A Commentary on the Revelations, 1619. This work expressed Couper's admiration for John Napier of Merchiston. It was directed against the Revelation of the Revelation of Thomas Brightman, which while critical of the apocalyptic ideas of John Foxe shared Foxe's Anglocentric vision.

His Works, to which was prefixed an account of his life, appeared in 1623, 2nd ed. 1629, 3rd 1726; and the Triumph of the Christian in three treatises appeared in 1632.

Religious titles
Preceded by Gavin Hamilton	Bishop of Galloway; 1612–1619	Succeeded by Andrew Lamb
