= Mackay of Borley =

The Mackays of Borley were a minor noble Scottish family and a branch of the ancient Clan Mackay, a Highland Scottish clan. Their territorial designation of Borley is a small village within the parish of Durness, in the modern-day county of Sutherland, Scotland

== Donald Mackay, I of Borley ==
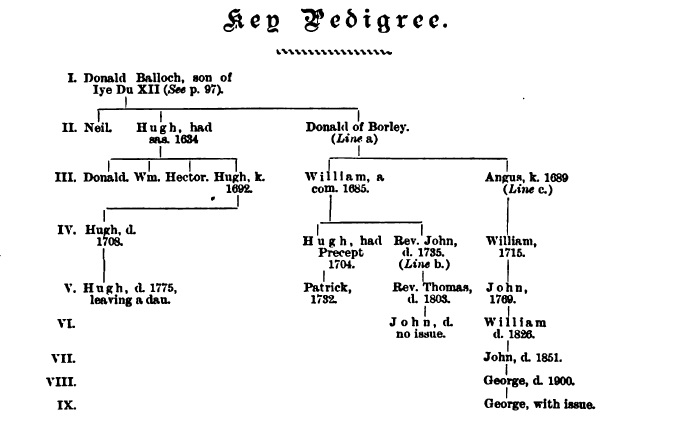
Family tree showing the lineal descent from Donald Mackay (1st) of Borley

Donald Mackay, 1st of Borley was the third son of Donald Balloch Mackay, 1st of the Mackay of Scoury branch of the clan, who in turn was the second eldest natural son of Iye Du Mackay, 12th of Strathnaver, chief of the Clan Mackay. Donald Mackay, 1st of Borley had “wadset” of the lands of Borley which was a historic form of tenure, now obsolete but once frequently used to make provisions for younger sons. Donald Mackay, 1st of Borley was a prominent Royalist and was, along with his chief Donald Mackay, 1st Lord Reay, captured at Balvenie Castle in 1649 during the Scottish Civil War.

Donald Mackay, 1st of Borley married Christina, daughter of the Rev. Robert Munro of Creich, Sutherland, and had the following children:

1. William Mackay, 2nd of Borley.
2. Angus Mackay.
3. Major Iye Mackay of Keoldale.
4. Donald Mackay.

== William Mackay, II of Borley ==
Captain William Mackay, 2nd of Borley was a zealous Royalist and led a company of Mackays at the Battle of Worcester in 1651. The Parliament of 1685 appointed him as a commissioner of supply in Sutherland, and again in 1691.

William Mackay, 2nd of Borley married Elizabeth, daughter of Alexander Corbet of Arkboll, Ross-shire and had the following children:

1. Hugh Mackay, 3rd of Borley.
2. Donald Mackay, who was connected with the Darien expedition.
3. Rev. John Mackay of Lairg.
4. Elizabeth Mackay, who married firstly the Hon. Charles Mackay of Sandwood, married secondly Robert Neilson Mackay of the Mackay of Aberach branch of the clan, married thirdly John Grey of Rhine, parish of Rogart, Sutherland.
5. Barbara Mackay, married Hector Mackay of Skerray.
6. Christina Mackay, married Hugh Munro of Achany.
7. Isobel Mackay, married John Mackay of Melness.
8. Jane Mackay, married Murdo, eldest son of Robert, son of Murdo Neilson Mackay, chieftain of the Mackays of Aberach.

== Hugh Mackay, III of Borley ==
Captain Hugh Mackay, 3rd of Borley commanded a company of Mackays that were raised in 1689 to assist General Hugh Mackay of the Mackay of Scoury branch of the clan. Afterwards Captain Hugh Mackay of Borley was appointed as constable of Ruthven Castle.

Hugh Mackay, 3rd of Borley married firstly Anne, daughter of Mackay, 2nd Lord Reay but had no issue. He married secondly Jane, daughter of Patrick Dunbar of Sidera and had the following children:

1. Hugh Mackay, who died unmarried in 1719.
2. Patrick Mackay, 4th of Borley.
3. John Mackay of Tordarroch, who married Jane, daughter of George Grey of Skibo Castle and who sold the lands of Tordarroch to the Earl of Sutherland in 1758.
4. Barbara Mackay, first wife of George Grey of Skibo Castle.
5. William Mackay, who emigrated to Georgia.
6. George Mackay, a writer in Edinburgh.
7. Donald Mackay, a merchant in London.
8. Robert Mackay, a merchant in Rotterdam.
9. Angus Mackay.
10. Elizabeth Mackay.

== Patrick Mackay, IV of Borley ==
Captain Patrick Mackay, 4th of Borley commanded a company of Mackays in support of the British Government during the Jacobite rising of 1715. After disponing his rights to the lands of Edderachilis over to Lord Reay and selling Sidera to the Earl of Sutherland, in 1732, Patrick Mackay, 4th of Borley joined General James Oglethorpe and accompanied a large body of people from Edderachilis to the new settlement of Georgia.

Patrick Mackay, 4th of Borley married Helen, daughter of the Rev. Iye Mackay of Clyne and had one daughter:

1. Jane Mackay, who married Alexander Gordon from Fife and had the following issue: Major Alexander Gordon of the 2nd Foot, Major George Gordon of the 8th West India Regiment, and Major Hugh Gordon of the 16th Foot and who was afterwards Lieutenant-General and Governor of Jersey.

== Bibliography ==
- Mackay, Angus (1906). The Book of Mackay. Edinburgh: Norman MacLeod, 25 George IV Bridge.
- Mackay, John of Rockfield (1936). Life of Lieut. General Hugh Mackay of Scoury. Edinburgh: Laing & Forbes.
- Mackay, Robert (1829). History of the House and Clan of Mackay. Edinburgh: Printed for the author by Andrew Jack & Co.
