= John Gordon, 16th Earl of Sutherland =

Scottish nobleman and army officer

The Right Honourable The Earl of Sutherland KT PC
- Predecessor: George Gordon, 15th Earl of Sutherland
- Successor: William Sutherland
- Other names: John Sutherland
- Born: 1661
- Died: 27 June 1733 (aged 71–72); Chelsea
- Wars and battles: Jacobite rebellion 1715
- Spouses: Helen Cochrane; Katherine Tollemache; Frances Hodgson
- Parents: George Gordon and Jean

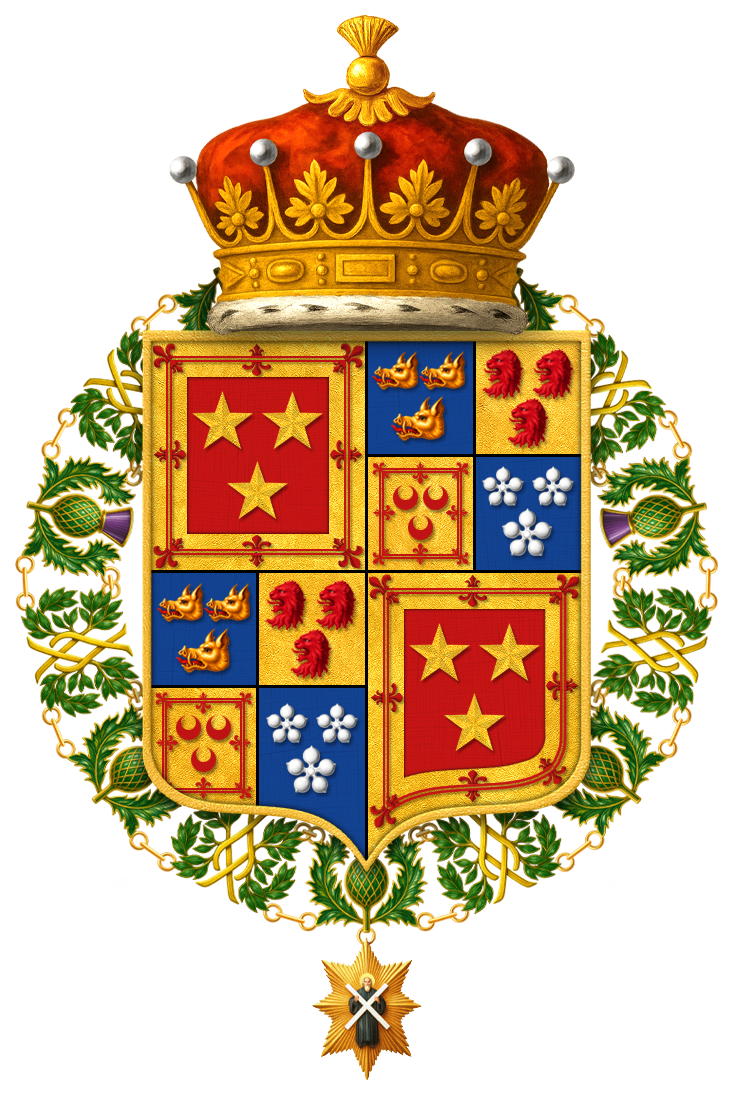
Quartered arms of John Gordon, 16th Earl of Sutherland, KT, PC

John Gordon, 16th Earl of Sutherland KT PC (1661–1733) was a Scottish nobleman and army officer.

He was the only son of George Gordon, 15th Earl of Sutherland (1633–1703), and his wife, Jean Wemmyss.

Upon his father's death in 1703 he succeeded as earl of Sutherland. He supported the revolution of 1688 and was a commissioner for the union of England and Scotland. He was a Scottish representative peer in four parliaments, president of the Board of Trade and manufactures, and lord-lieutenant of the eight northern counties of Scotland. In 1703 he was appointed a privy councillor by Queen Anne.

He aided in putting down the Jacobite rising of 1715. When the rebellion had been quashed, Gordon was invested by George I with the Order of the Thistle and was granted an annual pension of £1200 in recognition of his services. In 1719 he led his regiment in the Battle of Glen Shiel, which brought to an end the third Jacobite rising.

He resumed the name of Sutherland, instead of Gordon. In 1719 by decree of Lyon Court, he was thereafter recognised Chief of the Clan Sutherland.

== Family ==
He married three times, first to Helen, daughter of William Cochrane, Lord Cochrane and Catherine Kennedy; secondly to Katherine Tollemache, daughter of Sir Lionel Tollemache, 3rd Baronet and widow of James Stuart, Lord Doune; and thirdly to Frances Hodgson. He had two children with Helen:

- William Gordon, Lord Strathnaver (19 December 1683 – 13 July 1720) who married Catherine Morrison
- Jean Gordon (c. 1692, Scotland – 11 February 1747, Virginia)), who married James Maitland, the son of John Maitland, 5th Earl of Lauderdale.

Persuasive claims have been put forth in the Allan P. Gray account, that the "Honbl. Capt." referenced in the Dugald Gilchrist Papers is Lt. Col. James Sutherland of Uppat, of the 38th Foot, and superintendent of the estate of the Countess of Sutherland at Dunrobin, making James Sutherland an illegitimate son to Gordon (mother unknown). Illegitimate children are fairly common and though unproven this would account for the mysterious and suspicious familiarity between James Sutherland and the acquisition of the Uppat estate, the military appointments, and the closeness to the Gordon family at large.

Peerage of Scotland
Preceded by George Gordon	Earl of Sutherland; 1703–1733	Succeeded by William Sutherland
