= Garden hermit =

Person living alone on a landowner's estate

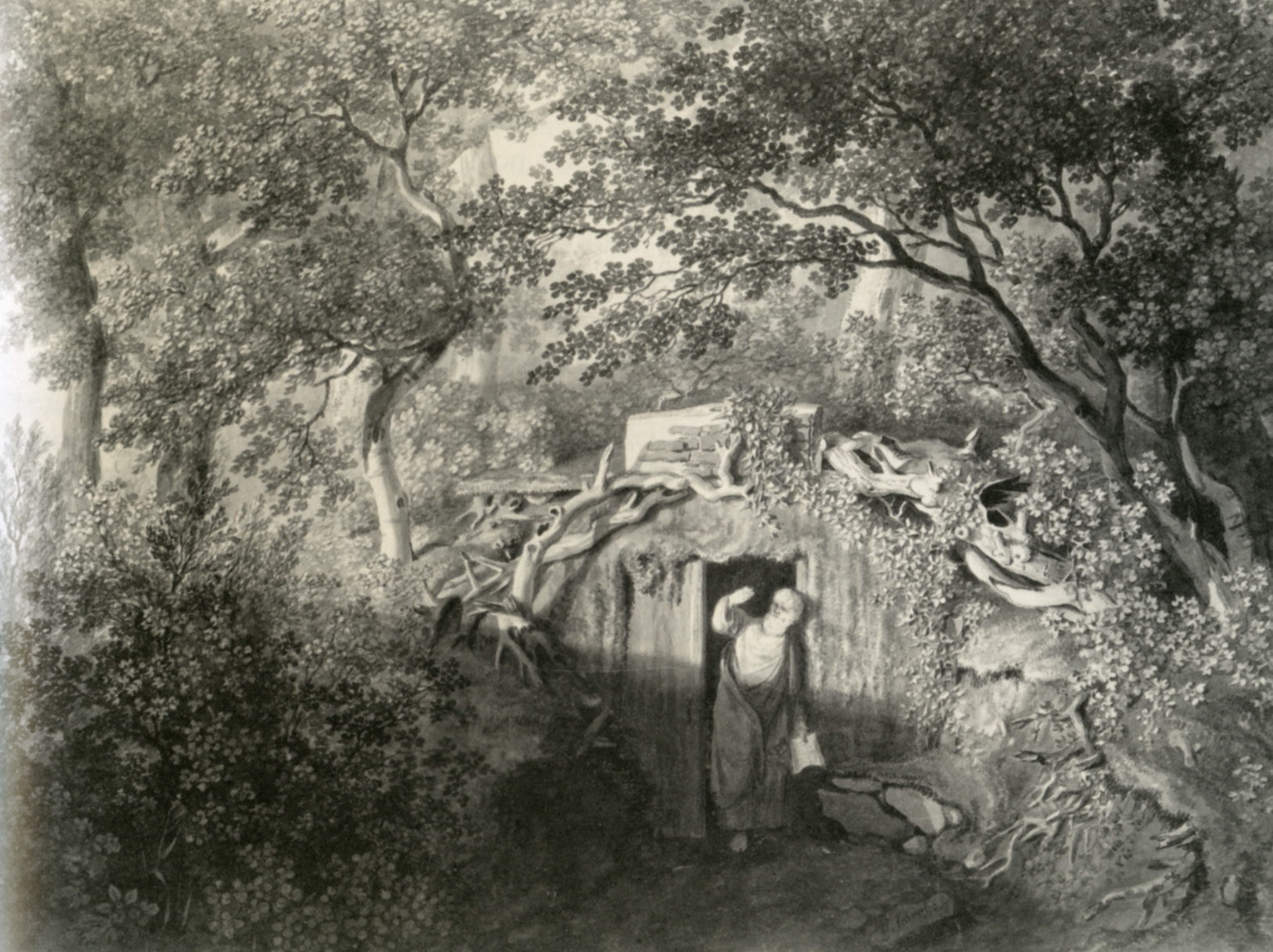
Representation of an ornamental hermit in Germany in the late 18th century

Garden hermits or ornamental hermits were people encouraged to live alone in purpose-built hermitages, follies, grottoes, or rockeries on the estates of wealthy landowners, primarily during the 18th century. Such hermits would be encouraged to remain permanently on site, where they could be fed, cared for, and consulted for advice, or viewed for entertainment.

== History ==
Professor Gordon Campbell, of the University of Leicester, suggests that Francis of Paola was among the first of the trend, living as a hermit in the early 15th century in a cave on his father's estate. Francis later served as a confidant and advisor to King Charles VIII.

Thereafter, throughout France, estates of dukes and other lords often included small chapels or other buildings where a resident hermit could remain in attendance. According to Campbell, the first estate with a well-known hermitage (which included a small house, chapel and garden) was Château de Gaillon, renovated by Charles Cardinal de Bourbon during the 16th century.

In the 1590s, William Cecil and Robert Cecil twice welcomed Elizabeth I to Theobalds House near London with entertainments delivered by a hermit. Garden hermits became popular with British aristocracy during the 18th and early 19th centuries. Contemporary accounts suggest the Weld family kept an ornamental hermit in a purpose-built hermitage on the Lulworth Estate in Dorset. Of equivalent novelty, the Welds also maintained a "mimic" fort and harbour beside an adjoining lake. Both Painshill and Hawkstone Park were said to have employed ornamental hermits. The one at Painshill, hired by The Hon. Charles Hamilton for a seven-year term under strict conditions, lasted three weeks until he was sacked after being discovered in a local pub.

The trend continued through the 1830s, when the idea became less popular as estate landscaping concepts evolved.

== Concept ==
Even in the 18th and 19th centuries, garden hermits were novelties and eccentricities. Grottos had become more popular during the 18th century as places to withdraw for meditation, relaxation, and reflection. With an increased focus on industrialism and production, contemplative garden meditation was viewed by some as an extravagance. With the lack of personal free time in combination with an increase in disposable income, the popularity of "natural" garden landscaping and the rise of neoclassical culture established an environment in which the idea of garden hermits as novelty guests became popular.

In some early instances, hermits were simply represented or hinted-at, rather than personified; outside a folly or grotto, a small table and chair, reading glasses and a classical text might be placed suggesting that it was where a hermit lived. Later, suggestions of hermits were replaced with actual hermits – men hired for the sole purpose of inhabiting a small structure and functioning as any other garden ornament. Hermits would sometimes be asked to make themselves available to guests, answering questions and providing counsel. In some cases, the hermits would not communicate with visitors, functioning instead like a perpetual stage play or live diorama.

In return for their services-in-residence, hermits would generally receive a stipend in addition to room and board.

== In popular culture ==
- Tony Robinson's Channel 4 television documentary show The Worst Jobs in History featured this occupation in a 2004 episode focusing on the worst jobs of the Georgian era.
- Tom Stoppard's 1993 play Arcadia deals specifically with the case of an ornamental hermit, investigated by one of the main characters.
- Terry Pratchett had Sam Vimes discover that his wife's country estate housed an ornamental hermit in his 2011 novel Snuff.
- The podcast This Job is History featured Garden Hermits as a job on November 28, 2022.

== See also ==
- Sacred garden
- Historic garden conservation
- List of obsolete occupations
