= Gavin Hamilton (bishop of Galloway) =

The Right Reverend Gavin Hamilton
- Bishop of Galloway
- Church: Church of Scotland
- Diocese: Galloway
- In office: 1605–1612
- Predecessor: Vacant; Last preceded by George Gordon
- Successor: William Couper
- Previous post: Minister of Hamilton

Orders
- Consecration: 21 October 1610 by George Abbot

Personal details
- Born: 1561 Scotland
- Died: February 1612 (aged 50–51)

Gavin Hamilton (1561–1612), bishop of Galloway, was the second son of John Hamilton of Orbiston, Lanarkshire. The father, descended from Sir James Hamilton of Cadzow, fell at the battle of Langside, fighting for Mary, Queen of Scots (13 May 1568).

== Life ==
Gavin was born about 1561, and was educated at the university of St. Andrews, where he took his degree in 1584.

He was ordained and admitted to the second charge of Hamilton in 1590, was translated to the parish of Bothwell in 1594, and again to the first charge of Hamilton in 1604. At an early period of his ministry he was appointed by the general assembly to the discharge of important duties pertaining to the office of superintendent or visitor, and after 1597 he was one of the standing commission chosen by the church from among its more eminent clergy to confer with the king on ecclesiastical matters.

A supporter of the royal measures for the restoration of episcopacy, he received on 3 March 1605, the temporalities of the bishopric of Galloway, to which were added those of the priory of Whithorn on 29 September and of the abbeys of Dundrennan and Glenluce. In 1606 he became dean of the Chapel Royal at Holyrood, on the revival of that office by King James. In 1606 the general assembly appointed him constant moderator of the presbytery of Kirkcudbright, and three years later he was sent up to court by the other titular bishops to confer with the king as to further measures which were in contemplation for the advancement of their order.

The church having agreed in 1610 to the restoration of the ecclesiastical power of bishops, Hamilton, with John Spottiswoode, archbishop of Glasgow, and Andrew Lamb, bishop of Brechin, were called up to London by the king, and were consecrated 21 October of that year in the chapel of London House according to the English ordinal by the bishop of London, the bishop of Ely, bishop of Rochester, and the bishop of Worcester. They were not reordained, as the validity of ordination by presbyters was then recognised by the English church and state.

On his return to Scotland Hamilton assisted in consecrating the rest of the bishops, and died in February 1612, aged about 51. Robert Keith described him as "an excellent good man", and in the lampoons he fared better than most of his party. Calderwood says that he seldom preached after his consecration, and died deep in debt, notwithstanding his rich preferments. He married Alison, daughter of James Hamilton of Bothwellhaugh, and had a son, John of Inchgoltrick, commendator of Soulseat, and a daughter, wife of (1) John Campbell, bishop of Argyll, and (2) Dunlop of that ilk.

== Sources ==
- Keith, Robert, An Historical Catalogue of the Scottish Bishops: Down to the Year 1688, (London, 1824)
- Sprott, G. W. (1890). "Hamilton, Gavin (1561?-1612)". In Stephen, Leslie; Lee, Sidney (eds.). Dictionary of National Biography. Vol. 24. London: Smith, Elder & Co. pp. 154–155.
- Watt, D. E. R., Fasti Ecclesiae Scotinanae Medii Aevi ad annum 1638, 2nd Draft, (St Andrews, 1969)

Attribution

This article incorporates text from a publication now in the public domain: Sprott, George Washington (1890). "Hamilton, Gavin (1561?-1612)". In Stephen, Leslie; Lee, Sidney (eds.). Dictionary of National Biography. Vol. 24. London: Smith, Elder & Co. pp. 154–155.

Religious titles
Preceded by Vacant; Last preceded by George Gordon	Bishop of Galloway; 1605–1612	Succeeded by William Couper
