= Hermit's Welcome at Theobalds =

The Hermit's Welcome at Theobalds was an entertainment for Elizabeth I performed on 10 May 1591, based around a hermit.

The verses of the Hermit's Welcome were recited at Theobalds, possibly by Sir Robert Cecil, son of the owner of the house. The hermit welcomed the queen in front of the house with the words, "My sovereign lady and most gracious queen: Be not displeased that one so meanly clad: Presumes to stand thus boldly in the way: That leads into this house accounted yours".

The speech discusses the possible retirement of William Cecil, 1st Baron Burghley from public life. A manuscript of the hermit's verses, once in the possession of the theatre historian John Payne Collier, is held by the British Library. Some revisions to the text may possibly be in Robert Cecil's hand.

The entertainment involved a mock charter, dated 10 May 1591 and signed by Christopher Hatton, from the "disconsolate and retired spirit, the Heremite of Tyboll", who was leaving after two years and two months at Theobalds to retire to his old cave. The elapse of time may refer to the death of Burghley's wife, Mildred Cooke in 1589.

Other speeches were made by the gardener and molecatcher at Theobalds, possibly on a subsequent day. The gardener describes a plot divided into four quarters, including a maze of flowers representing the virtues. An arbour constructed of eglantine flowers at "my master's conceit" symbolised the queen's chastity or virgin state.

The garden was laid out after the molecatcher had cleared the ground. During the work, a box containing a jewel was found, which was presented to the queen as treasure trove. The jewel had been buried in ancient times by the daughter of a giant who had been transformed into a mole. It would be found when England had been ruled by a Virgin Queen for 33 years.

The prophecy was written on the box:

I was a giant's daughter of this isle,
Turned to a mole by the Queen of Corn:
My jewel I did bury by a wile,
Again never from the earth to be torn,
Till a virgin had reigned thirty-three years,
Which shall be but the fourth part of her years.

Records of the expenses of the royal visit survive in the Cecil papers and the National Archives. It used to be thought that George Peele was the author of the entertainment.

== The Hermit's Oration ==
The hermit of Theobalds delivered another oration to Queen Elizabeth in 1594. She visited the house between 13 and 23 June. The prose speech refers again to the great age of William Cecil (1520-1598) and his son Robert Cecil, author of the entertainment, "although his experience and judgement be no way comparable yet, he hath some things in him like the child of such a parent". The hermit offered the Queen a gold bell, a prayer book garnished with gold, and a wax candle of new virgin wax "meet for a Virgin Queen".

In July 1606 James VI and I and his brother-in-law Christian IV of Denmark came to Theobalds and were welcomed with Ben Jonson's The Entertainment of the Kings of Great Britain and Denmark.
