= Geneviève Petau de Maulette =

Madame Geneviève Pétau de Maulette, Lady Glenluce (c. 1563–1643) was a French noblewoman, tutor to Elizabeth of Bohemia, author and the second wife of John Gordon, D.D., Dean of Salisbury and Lord Glenluce and Longormes.

== Biography ==
Pétau was born in Brittany, France. Her parentage is not known for sure, but she was probably the daughter of François Pétau, seigneur de Maulette.

Pétau was raised a Protestant, and in 1594 she married Dr. John Gordon, a prominent Scottish reverend who was Gentleman of the Bedchamber to the French king.

Their son-in-law, Robert Gordon of Gordonstoun, wrote that she was the French teacher to the eldest daughter of King James I and Queen Anne of Denmark, Princess Elizabeth, and that her daughter Louisa, who he later married, was brought up with the princess in Lord Harrington's household.

Geneviève died on 6 December 1643 at Gordonstoun, Moray, and was buried at the Michael Kirk in the old churchyard of Oggston in the parish of Drainie, Moray.

She owned a portrait miniature of King James I in a case decorated with diamonds. She worked a suite of furniture at Gordonston in green tent stitch including bed, cupboard cloth, stools, chair and couch.

== Works ==
Dame Geneviève is remembered for her work in French entitled, Devoreux, Vertues Teares for the Losse of King Henry III of Fraunce, by a learned gentlewoman, Madame Geneviève Petau. The poem praises Henry III of France and an English nobleman, Walter Devereux. The work was written some time after the end of the siege of Rouen in late 1591 and before it was translated into English in 1597 by Gervase Markham.

In July 1606, Christian IV of Denmark and King James visited Theobalds House. Ben Jonson provided a spectacle known as The Entertainment of the Kings of Great Britain and Denmark. John Gordon wrote a dialogue commemorating the occasion, in English and Latin, and Geneviève Petau provided a translation into French.

== Family ==
Lady Geneviève and her husband had one child, Lucie or Louise (1597–1680), who married Sir Robert Gordon of Gordonstoun, fourth son of 12th Earl of Sutherland. Their daughter Katherine Gordon was mother of the Quaker Robert Barclay.

His daughter Elizabeth Gordon was born at Salisbury in January 1617. At her christening, the Earl of Hertford was a godfather, Lucy Russell, Countess of Bedford, and Jean Drummond, Countess of Roxburghe were godmothers.

== Bibliography ==
- Cox, Michael, ed. (2004). "1596". The Concise Oxford Chronology of English Literature. Oxford University Press. p. 54. ISBN 0-19-860634-6.
- Mullan, David David George (October 2008) [2004]. "Gordon, John (1544–1619)". Oxford Dictionary of National Biography (online ed.). Oxford University Press. doi:10.1093/ref:odnb/11061. (Subscription, Wikipedia Library access or UK public library membership required.)
- Prescott, Anne Lake (2008). "Mary Sidney's Antonius and the ambiguities of French history". The Free Library.
