= Battle of Clynetradwell =

1590 Scottish clan battle

- Part of Earl of Sutherland and Earl of Caithness feud
- Coats of arms of the Earl of Sutherland (left) and Earl of Caithness (right)
Date	October 1590
Location	Clyne, near Brora in the county of Sutherland, Scotland
Result	Earl of Caithness’s army retreats.

Belligerents
Clan Sutherland (supporters of Alexander Gordon, 12th Earl of Sutherland)	Clan Sinclair (supporters of George Sinclair, 5th Earl of Caithness)

Commanders and leaders
Patrick Gordon of Garty; John Gordon of Embo; John Gordon of Kilcalmkill; John Morray of Aberscross †	George Sinclair, 5th Earl of Caithness; Nicolas Sutherland of Forse †; Donald Balloch Mackay of Scoury

Strength
400 or 500	1,500

Casualties and losses
John Morray killed. 16 common soldiers killed. Gordon of Kilcalmkill (WIA); William Morray (WIA)	Nicolas Sutherland and Angus-Mack-Angus-Termack killed. 13 others killed.

The Battle of Clynetradwell was a Scottish clan battle that took place in 1590 in the county of Sutherland between the forces of Alexander Gordon, 12th Earl of Sutherland and George Sinclair, 5th Earl of Caithness (chief of Clan Sinclair).

== Background ==
The Earl of Sutherland and Earl of Caithness had long been at feud. In 1587 the Earl of Caithness's forces had killed George Gordon of Marle who was a relative of Alexander Gordon, 12th Earl of Sutherland, and his death caused a great sensation in Sutherland. An ally of the Earl of Caithness, John Sutherland, was also killed.

In 1590 Sinclair, Earl of Caithness gathered all of his forces and invaded Sutherland. He was in fact supported by the Sutherland Laird of Forse who was seated at Forse Castle, and who descended from the original line of Earls of Sutherland who had been ousted and replaced by the Gordons in the early 16th century, and the hamlet of Forse was in the county of Caithness. The Earl of Caithness was also supported by Donald Balloch Mackay of Scourie who was a half-brother of Huistean Du Mackay, 13th of Strathnaver, chief of the Clan Mackay. Huistean Du Mackay actually supported the Earl of Sutherland in 1590 but he and his half-brother Donald had long been disunited owing to a disputed chiefship: Donald Balloch was actually the elder of the two but his parents having been first cousins meant that their marriage was an irregular one under canon law and so he could not succeed as clan chief. Also, Donald Balloch Mackay had been banished out of Strathnaver and Sutherland for killing James Mackroy and therefore retired himself to the Earl of Caithness.

== Battle ==
The Gordons of Sutherland watched the Earl of Caithness's men driving away a large herd of cattle at Clynetradwell (or "Clentredvaill"). According to the Gordon account, the Gordons of Sutherland, more rashly than wisely rushed upon their enemies who were far superior in numbers. They skirmished with great obstinacy and rescued the cattle. The inhabitants of Sutherland then chased the Earl of Caithness's army. However, Caithness's archers under Donald Balloch Mackay were reformed three times after being thrown into confusion, and Donald Balloch Mackay encouraged his men to "stick to it". The combat was furious and long but in the end the Earl of Caithness's army retreated. According to historian Angus Mackay, Donald Balloch Mackay saved the situation for the Earl of Caithness. Even the Gordon account states that Donald Balloch Mackay played the part of a good commander.

On the Earl of Caithness's side Nicolas Sutherland (brother of the Laird of Forse) and Angus-Mack-Angus-Termack were killed, along with thirteen others. On the Earl of Sutherland's side John Morray who was a faithful servant to the Earl of Sutherland was killed, along with sixteen common soldiers.

== Aftermath ==
While the Earl of Caithness was still in Sutherland, Huistean Du Mackay who supported the Earl of Sutherland spoiled Caithness to the gates of Thurso.

Donald Balloch Mackay was later captured and imprisoned in Dunrobin Castle but was released by the Earl of Sutherland with the consent of his half-brother Huistean Du Mackay, chief of Clan Mackay. Afterwards, like his half-brother, Donald Balloch remained loyal to the Earl of Sutherland.

The feud between the Earl of Sutherland and Earl of Caithness continued for many years after.

== See also ==
- Earl of Caithness
- Earl of Sutherland
