= Edward Henryson =

Edward Henryson (French: Henry Édouard, Latin: Henricius Eduardus) (1522–c.1590) was a Scottish judge, known also as a jurist and classical scholar.

== Life ==
Joseph Swan (1796–1872) claimed Edward Henryson was a grandson of Robert Henryson. He studied Roman law at the University of Bourges, where he graduated, working under the civilian Éguinaire Baron. Introduced to Ulrich Fugger of Kirchberg and Weissenhome in the Tyrol, a young humanist, Henryson was put on a pension, and occupied himself in collecting and translating classical texts. In 1552 he returned to Scotland, and may have practised for a short time as an advocate in Edinburgh. He was in 1554 elected professor of Roman law at Bourges.

Through the humanist network and a recommendation to Robert Reid, Henryson in 1556 returned to Scotland and a lecturing position in the classics. In 1557 he was appointed counsel for the poor. In 1563 he was named to the office of commissary, and three years after he became an extraordinary lord of session. Henryson was one of the team of layers involved in the divorce of the Earl of Bothwell and Jean Gordon in 1567. In 1573 he was one of the procurators for the church.

In 1579 Lord Forbes petitioned parliament that Henryson might be appointed one of the commissioners for settling the disputes between the Forbes and the Gordons. He died about 1590.

== Works ==
For Fugger, Henryson translated into Latin the commentary of Plutarch on stoic philosophy, a work published at Leyden in 1555, with an appendix containing emendations of doubtful readings in the original Greek text. A treatise published by Baron on the law of jurisdiction was attacked by the jurist António de Gouveia; Henryson wrote a Latin reply in defence of Baron, dedicated to Fugger. In 1555 he published another work on Roman law, Commentatio in Tit. x. Libri Secundi Institutionum de Testamentis Ordinandis, which was dedicated to Michel de L'Hôpital, chancellor of France. Both these legal works were included in the Novus thesaurus juris civilis et canonici of Gerard Meerman.

In 1566 Henryson was named one of a commission to revise, correct, and print the laws and acts of the Scottish parliament from 1424 to 1564. The work was completed in about six months. Henryson was the ostensible editor, and wrote the preface to it. He obtained an exclusive privilege to print and dispose of the work for a period of ten years from the date of publication.

== Family ==
Henryson married Helen Swinton, eldest daughter of John Swinton of Swinton, and had two sons and a daughter. One of his sons was Thomas Henryson, Lord Chesters.

== Notes ==
Attribution

This article incorporates text from a publication now in the public domain: Stephen, Leslie; Lee, Sidney, eds. (1891). "Henryson, Edward". Dictionary of National Biography. Vol. 26. London: Smith, Elder & Co.
