= George Gordon, 15th Earl of Sutherland =

Scottish nobleman

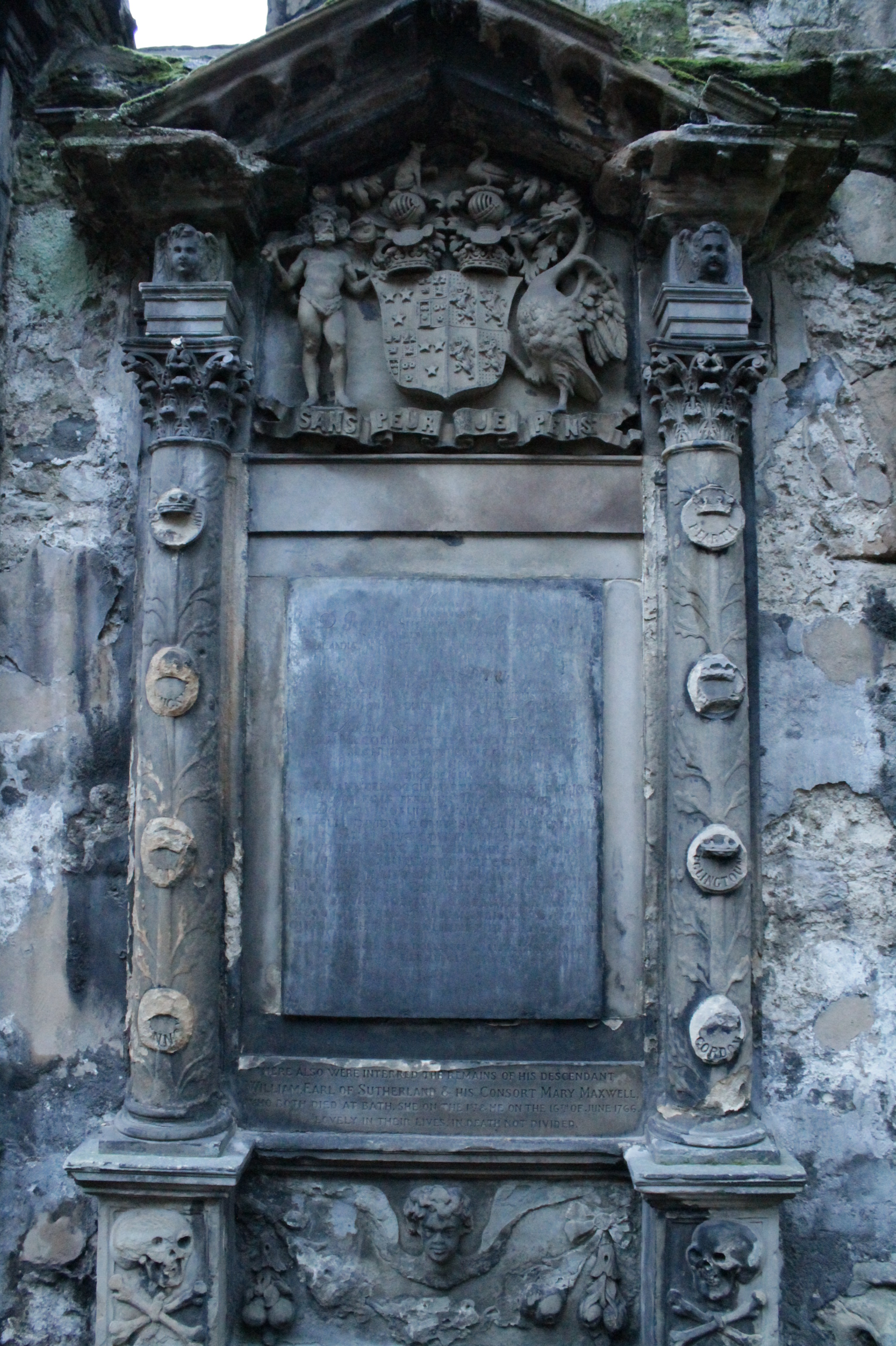
The grave of George, 15th Earl of Sutherland, Holyrood Abbey

George Gordon, 15th Earl of Sutherland (2 November 1633 – 4 March 1703) was a Scottish nobleman.

He was the eldest surviving son of John Gordon, 14th Earl of Sutherland, and his first wife Lady Jean Drummond, daughter of James Drummond, the 1st Earl of Perth. On 11 Aug 1659 he married Lady Jean Wemyss, daughter of David Wemyss, 2nd Earl of Wemyss, and his first wife Anna Balfour. His only son was John Gordon, 16th Earl of Sutherland. He also had one daughter Anna who married Robert Arbuthnott, 3rd Viscount of Arbuthnott.

He is buried in Holyrood Abbey. His ornate monument by James Smith stands on the north wall.

Peerage of Scotland
Preceded by John Gordon	Earl of Sutherland; 1679–1703	Succeeded by John Gordon
