= Ardvreck Castle =

Tower keep in Scotland

- Sutherland in Scotland
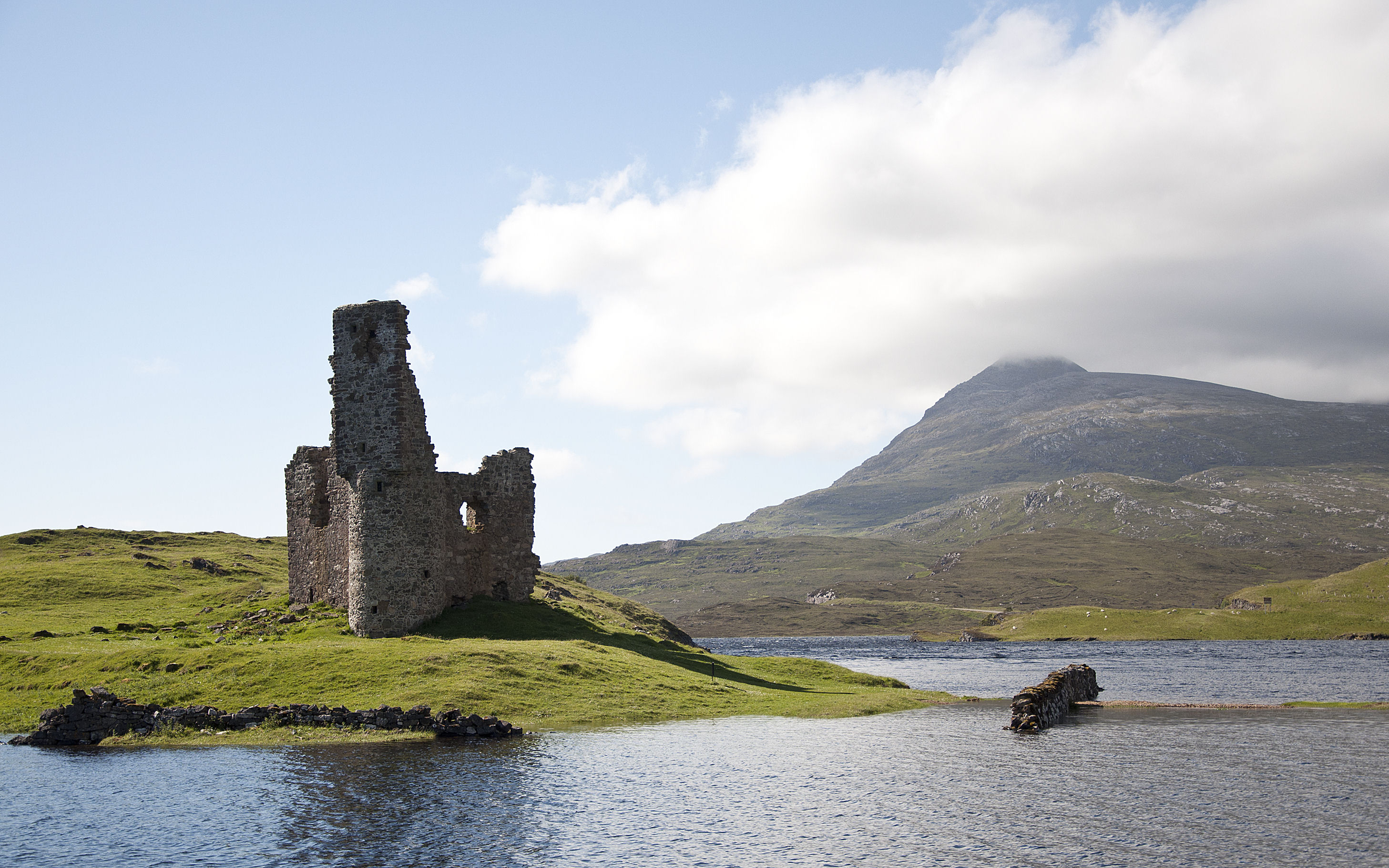
- Present day ruins of the castle

Site information
- Condition: Ruined

Location
- Location within Highland Ardvreck Castle (the United Kingdom)
- Coordinates: 58.166389°N 4.994444°W

Site history
- Built: 1490
- Built by: Clan MacLeod
- Materials: Stone
- Fate: Destroyed in 1672 by Clan MacKenzie

Ardvreck Castle is a castle, now ruinous, standing on a rocky promontory in Loch Assynt, Sutherland, Scotland, UK. The structure dates from about 1490 and is associated with the then landowners, the Macleods of Assynt.

== History of Ardvreck ==
The castle was built in the 15th century by the MacLeods of Assynt. It replaced Assynt Castle which was four miles (six kilometres) northwest of Inchnadamph.

Ardvreck is notable as the place where the royalist James Graham, 1st Marquess of Montrose was handed over in 1650 to the Covenanter forces by MacLeod, Laird of Assynt after the Battle of Carbisdale. The true history of this event is unclear. One account is that MacLeod, loyal to the Covenanters, arrested the weary, fleeing, Montrose and held him. Another is that he provided comfortable shelter, but betrayed Montrose for a £25,000 reward.

Clan Mackenzie attacked and captured Ardvreck Castle in 1672, and then took control of the Assynt lands. In 1726 they constructed a more modern manor house nearby, Calda House which takes its name from the Calda burn beside which it stands. A fire destroyed the house in 1737 and both Calda House and Ardvreck Castle stand as ruins today. They are designated as scheduled monuments.

Ardvreck on a misty day in July 2024

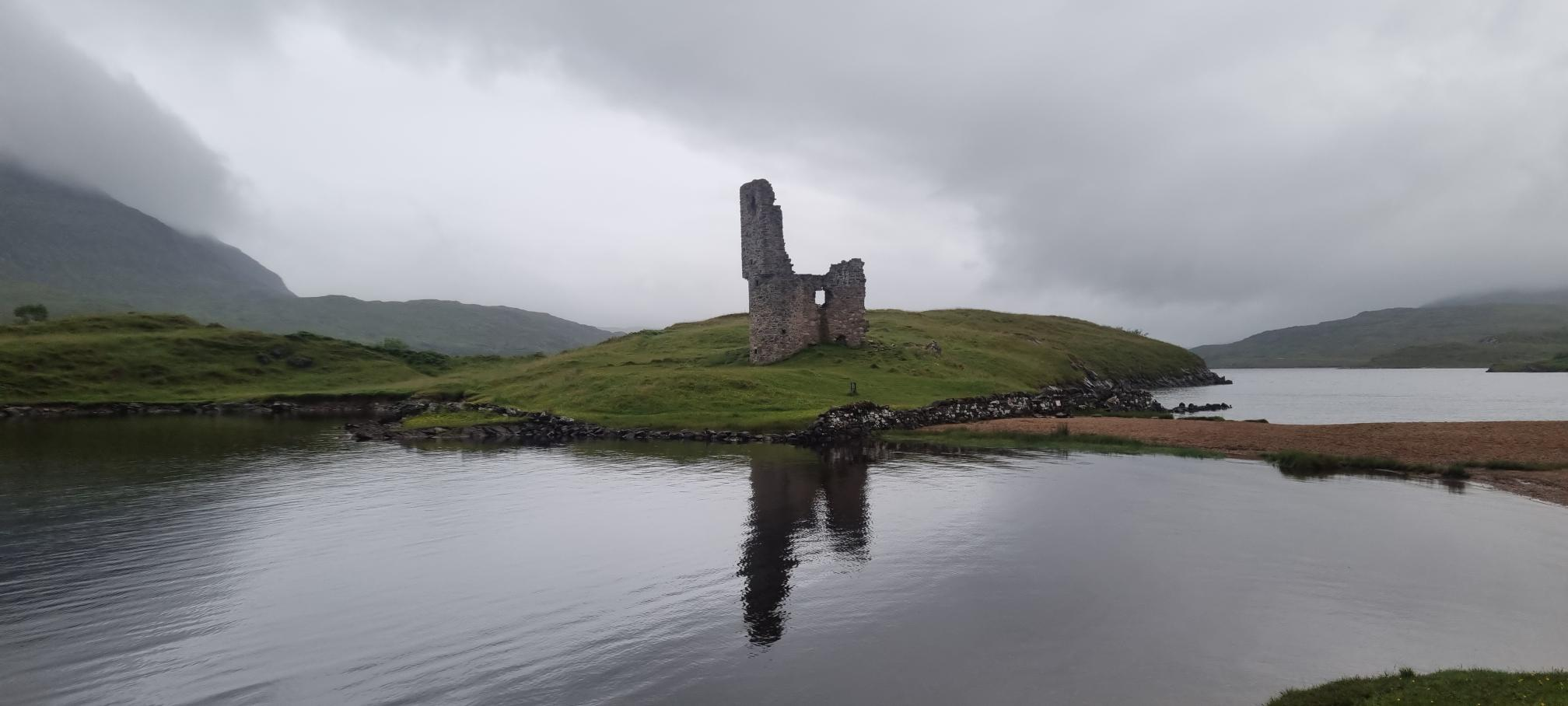

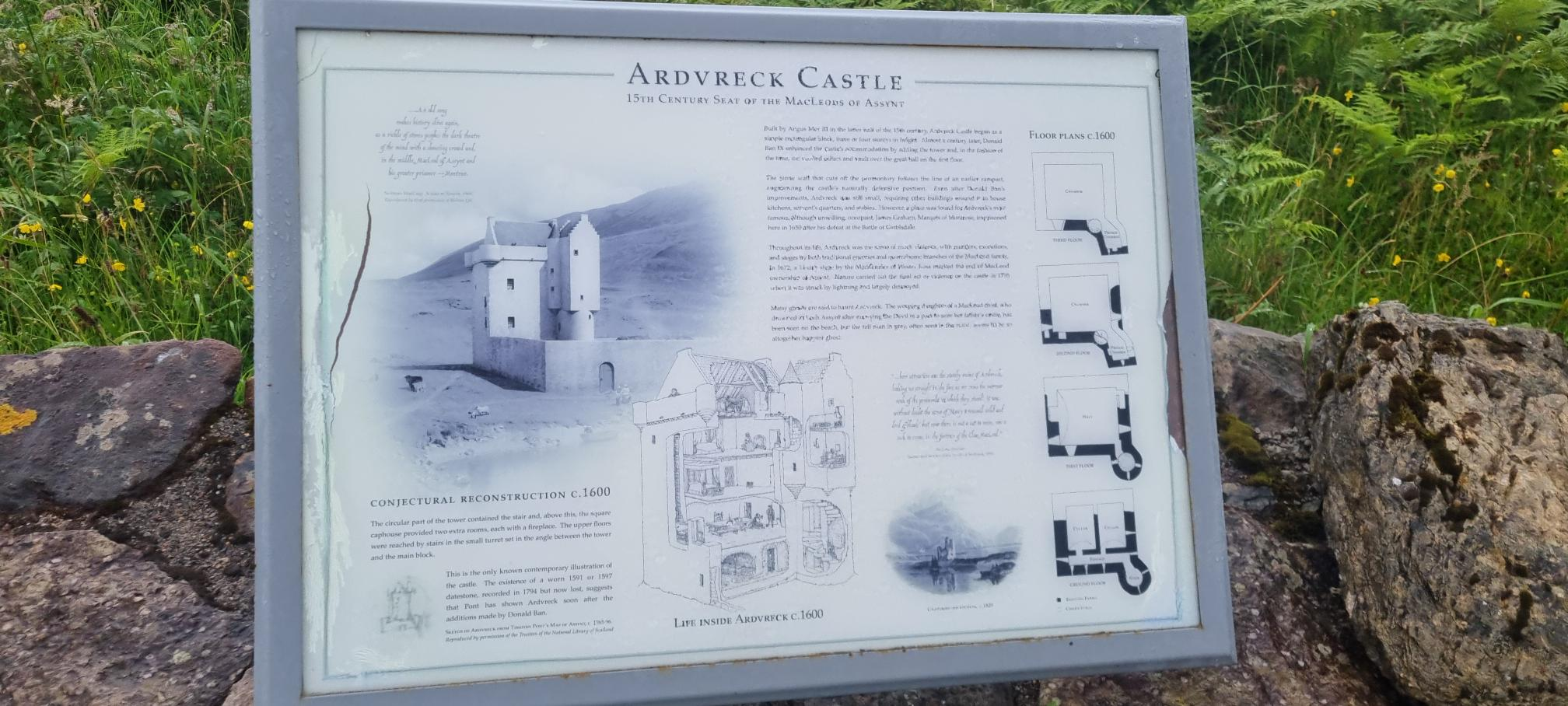

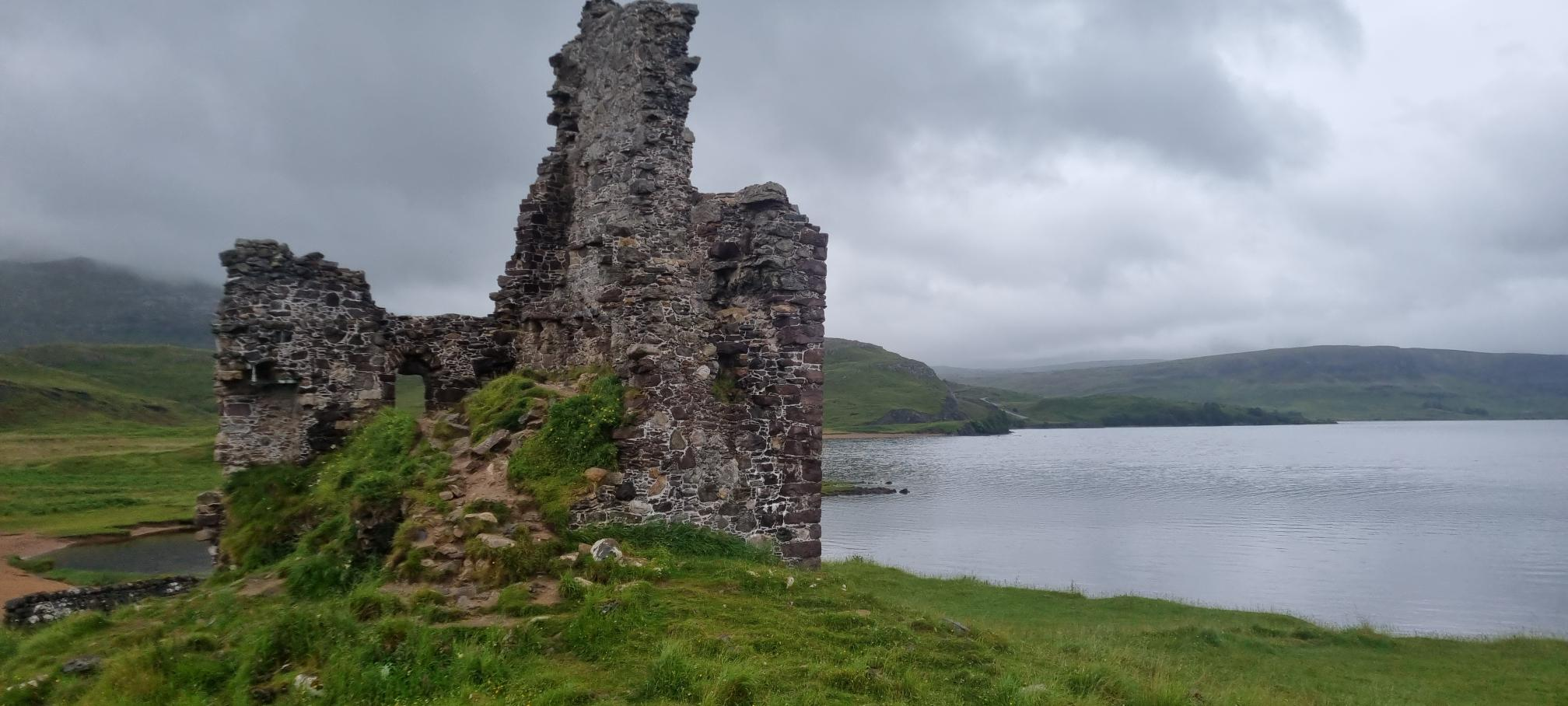

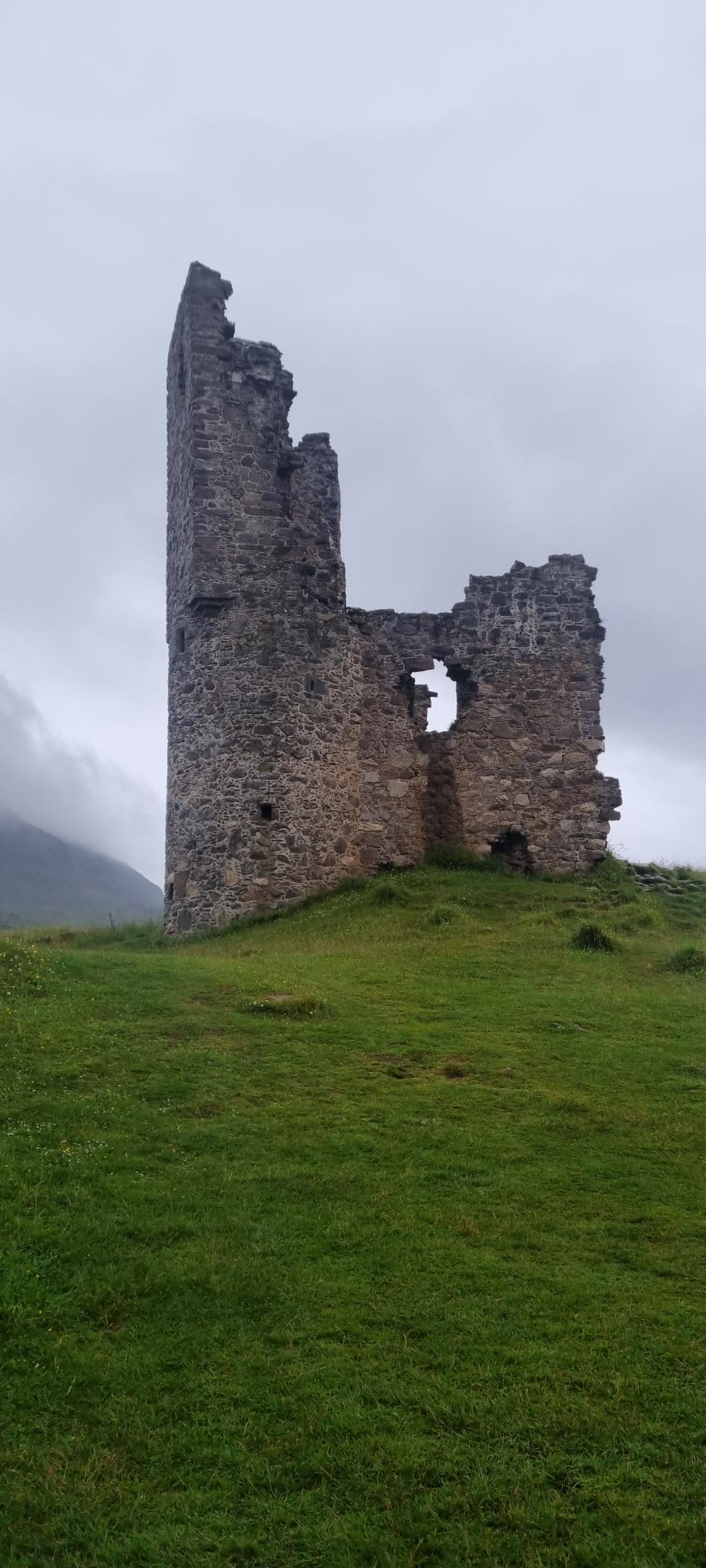

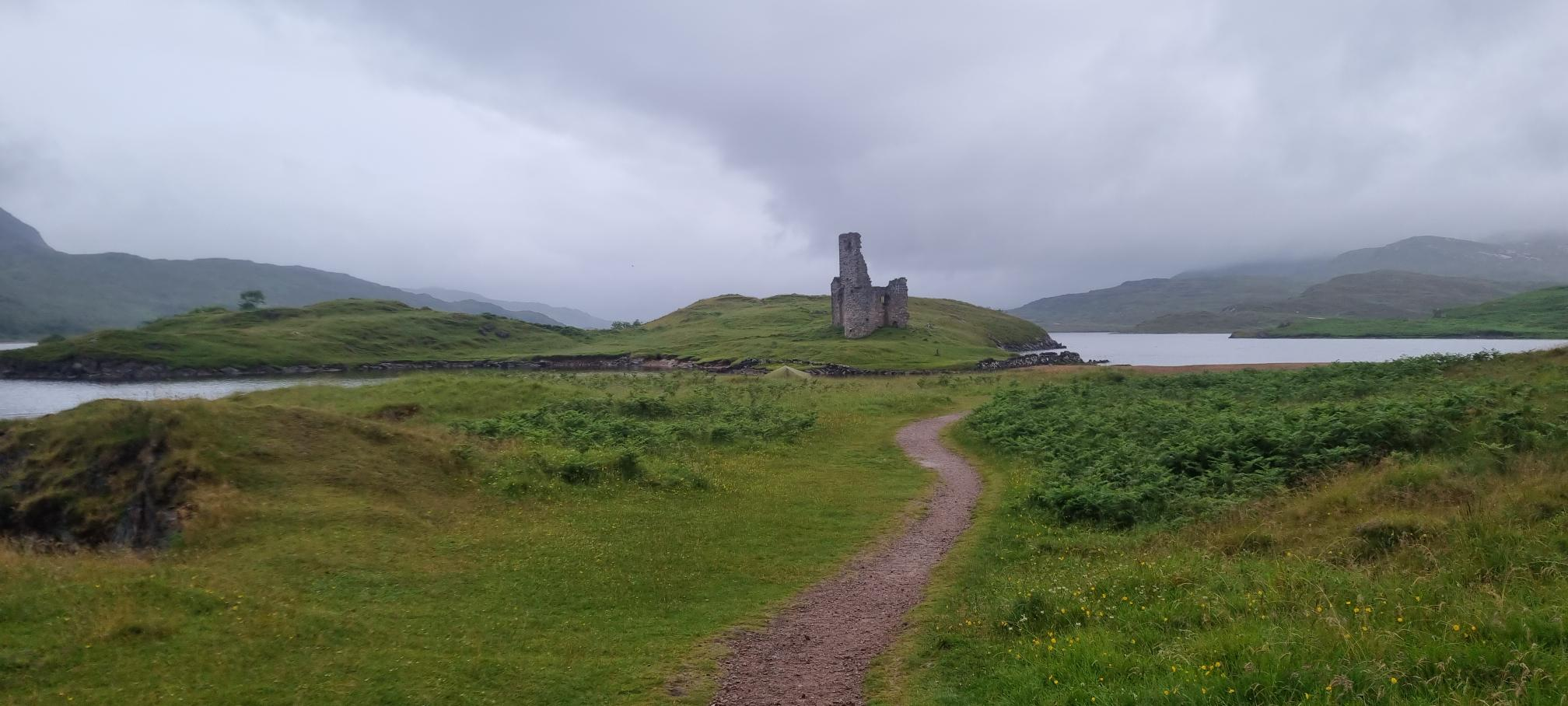

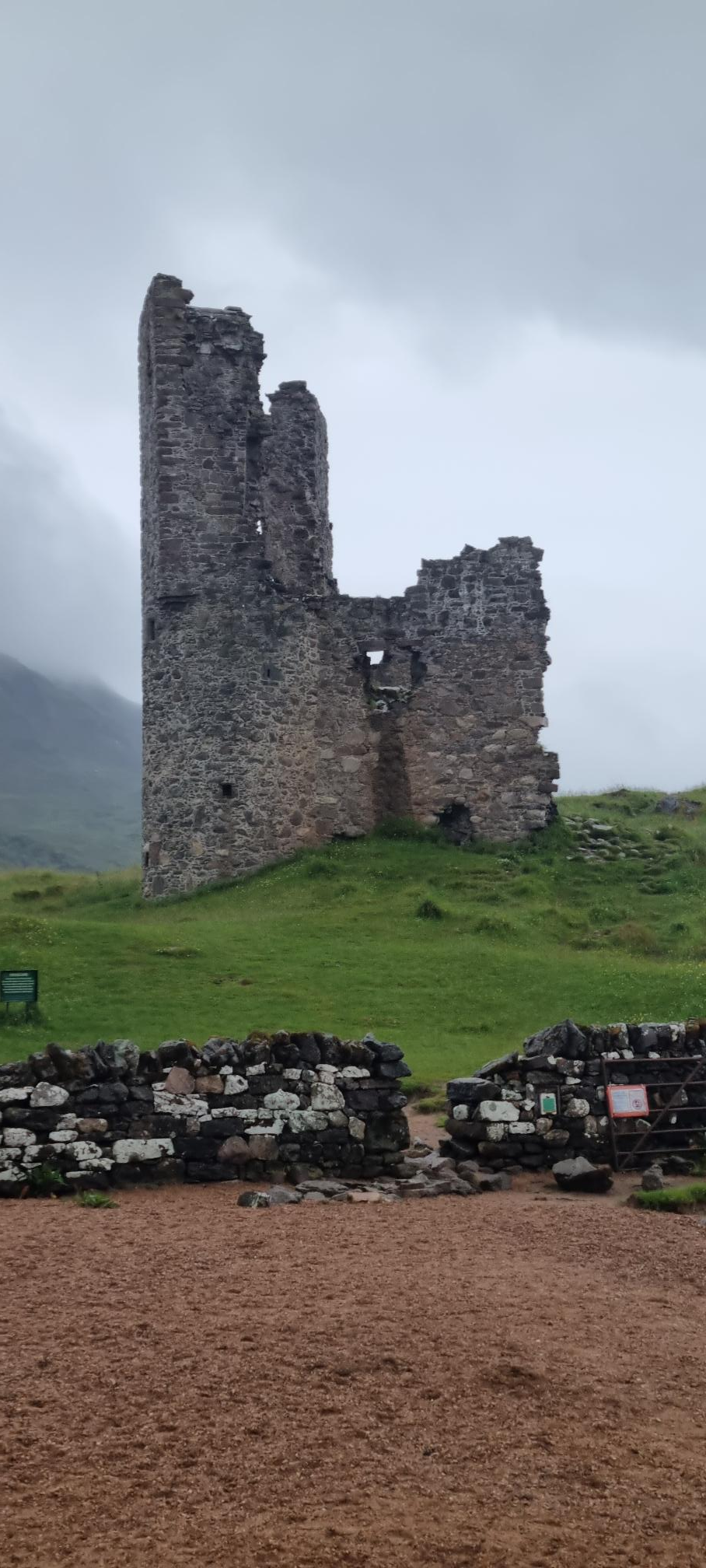

== Architecture ==
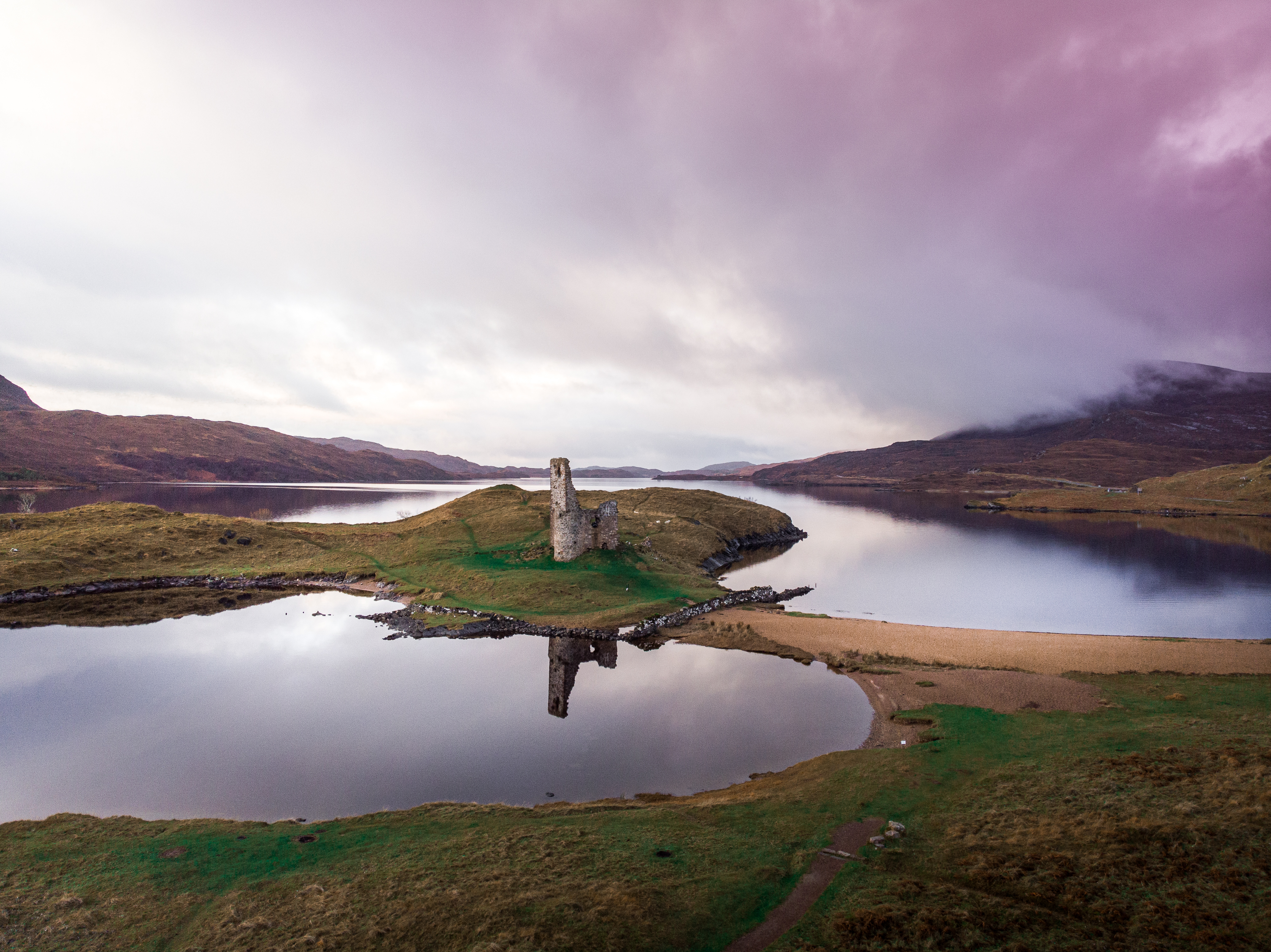
Ardvreck Castle

The castle was a simple rectangular keep with a round staircase tower at the south-east angle. It was corbelled out on the upper floors to form square rooms, the small stair turret to these upper rooms being carried on the corbelling. There were three compartments on the ground floor which were all vaulted. There appear to have been four floors, and the first of these is also vaulted with the other floors being simply joisted. The castle also had several gunports.
