= John Gordon (bishop, born 1544) =

Scottish prelate (1544–1619)

John Gordon (1 September 1544 – 3 September 1619) was a Scottish prelate, and Dean of Salisbury following the Union of the Crowns.

== Life ==
John Gordon was the natural son of Alexander Gordon (c. 1516–1575), Bishop of Galloway and former archbishop of Glasgow, and Barbara Logie; his parents married, perhaps clandestinely, only in 1546, before Alexander obtained ecclesiastical preferment (for this, see his new DNB entry).

Gordon first studied at St Leonard's College, St. Andrews. In June 1565 he was sent to pursue his education in France, having a yearly pension granted him by Mary, Queen of Scots, payable out of her French dowry. He spent two years at the universities of Paris and Orleans. On 4 January 1568 he was confirmed by royal charter in the bishopric of Galloway and abbacy of Tongland, vacated in his favour by his father; the charter specifies his skill in classical and oriental tongues. At this time he was in France, in the service of the Protestant leader, Prince Louis of Conde, but he soon came to England, entered the service of Thomas, Duke of Norfolk, and attended him at the conferences of York (October 1568) and Westminster (November 1568), held for the purpose of considering Mary's guilt.

When Norfolk was sent to the Tower (October 1569), Gordon transferred his services to Mary herself. In August 1571, he was excluded from her household at Sheffield Castle and wrote a letter of complaint to William Cecil mentioning an unfinished work on the history of rebellion. Mary sent him to join Archbishop Beaton in Paris. In September 1571, Mary wrote a letter to her banished servants including her hopes to inspire the hearts of "maistre Jehan Gordon and Guillaume Douglas". Willie Douglas had helped her escape from Lochleven Castle.

Mary commended him to the French king, and he enjoyed the post of gentleman ordinary of the privy chamber to Charles IX, Henry III, and Henry IV, with a yearly pension of four hundred crowns. He saved the lives of several countrymen at the St. Bartholomew's Day massacre, but never renounced Protestantism. In 1574 he exhibited his Hebrew learning in a public disputation at Avignon with the chief rabbi Benetrius. By his marriage in 1576 with Antoinette, widowed daughter of Rene de Marolles, he acquired an estate which gave him the style of "Sieur of Longorme". With the see of Galloway his connection was never more than nominal, the revenues going to his father or to his brother George.

Some of Gordon's books survive with his annotations in Greek and Latin. Around 1582, Gordon contributed a Latin poem on good rule which was added to a book commissioned as a present for James VI by Mary, Queen of Scots and Archbishop Beaton. The book, Xenophon's Xenophontis quae extant opera Annotationes Henrici Stephan, survives. It is unclear if James received it. The decoration includes references to the "association", Mary's project for a return to Scotland in joint rule with James.

In June 1583, Gordon was in Paris and approached the English ambassador Henry Cobham. This time he wanted to go to Scotland at the request of Catherine de Balsac and escort her son Ludovic Stewart, 2nd Duke of Lennox to Scotland where he would be brought up as a Protestant. Instead, the Master of Gray brought the young duke to Scotland. Gordon told Cobham that Mary had paid for his education in France. Cobham heard that Gordon had ambitions to negotiate for a marriage between James VI and Catherine of Bourbon, but it was suspected he would secretly work to reveal the plans of Henry of Navarre to Catherine de' Medici. At this time, Christina of Lorraine, was suggested as a Catholic bride for James VI.

In December 1583, Gordon applied to another English diplomat in Paris for a passport to travel to Scotland via England. He was said to often be in the company of the Duke of Guise and Catherine de' Medici. Edward Stafford forwarded Gordon's letter to Francis Walsingham, in which he claimed to be happily settled in France but anxious to return briefly to Scotland to do James VI some good service. He stated his employment had only ever been in literary matters, "es bonnes lettres".

Gordon is mentioned in 1588 as Bishop of Galloway; but he resigned his rights before 8 July 1586. His first wife died in 1591. He married in 1594 a strong Protestant, Genevieve, daughter of François Petau, sieur of Maulette. On 18 July 1594 in Paris, he signs the marriage contract between Suzanne Hotman and her first husband John Menteith, calling himself "Gentleman of the Bedchamber of the King [and] Seigneur of Boullay-Thierry".

According to a family history, in 1601, Gordon was selected by the Duchess of Lorraine, sister of Henry IV, to take part with Daniel Tilenus and Pierre Du Moulin in a public disputation against Du Perron (afterwards cardinal), who had been charged with the task of converting her to the Roman Catholic Church. The traditional may be unreliable.

On 8 July 1601, James VI sent William Schaw to consult with Master John Gordon on the construction of a monument to the King's rescue from the Gowrie House conspiracy the previous year. James VI wrote to Gordon that William would "conferre with yow thairanent, that ye maye agree upon the forme, devyse, and superscriptionis".

On the accession of King James to the English throne in 1603, Gordon published in French and English a strongly Protestant panegyric of congratulation and, in the same year, a piece in Latin elegiacs addressed to Prince Henry. James called him to England and nominated him in October to the deanery of Salisbury, whereupon he was ordained in his 59th year. He was present at the Hampton Court conference in January 1604 as "deane of Sarum", though he was not confirmed until 24 February. In the second day's conference, James singled him out "with a speciall encomion, that he was a man well trauailled in the auncients." He approved of the ring in marriage, but doubted the cross in baptism.

Gordon preached often at court, in 1604 celebrating the ancient name of "great Brittanie". Gordon was enthusiastic about the union, and argued that the new realm was an expanded Scotland. John Chamberlain wrote in April 1605, "Deane Gordon, preaching before the kinge, is come so farre about the matter of ceremonies, the out of Ezechiell and other places of the prophets, and by certain Hebrue characters, and other cabalisticall collections, he hath founde out and approved the use of the crosse, cap surplis et ct." During James' visit to Oxford in 1605 he was created a Doctor of Divinity (D.D.) on 13 August "because he was to dispute before the king his kinsman." He is described as of Balliol College. His second wife Geneviève Petau de Maulette taught French to Princess Elizabeth (1596–1662), afterwards queen of Bohemia. In 1611 the barony of Glenluce, which had belonged to his brother Lawrence, was bestowed on him by royal charter.

During the ten years 1603-13 Gordon produced a number of quartos notable for obscure learning, Protestant fervour, controversial elegiacs, and prophetic anticipations drawn from the wildest etymologies. He was assiduous in his ecclesiastical duties, which included a quasi-episcopal supervision of some eighty parishes. He procured an act of the chapter devoting one-fifth of the revenue of every prebend for seven years to cathedral repairs. While on a triennial visitation he died at Lewesdon, Dorset, in his seventy-fifth year. He was buried on 6 September in the morning chapel or quire of Salisbury Cathedral, where an inscribed stone marks his grave.

== Legacy ==
On the north wall of the choir there was a brass (which no longer exists) "bearing the figure of a bishop, raised from his tomb by two angels", with a long biographical epitaph in Latin (given in the 1723 history of the cathedral). The dean assigned the barony of Glenluce with all his French property to Sir Robert Gordon, whom he made his literary executor. He left books to the cathedral library, and a legacy for rebuilding the cloisters.

== Works ==
- Panegyrique de Congratulation... par Jean de Gordon Escossois, sieur de Long-orme, Gentil-homme ordinaire de la chambre du Roy Tres-Chrestien, &c., La Rochelle, 1603, 8vo; also in English, by E.G. (Grimston), 'A Panegyrique,' &c., London, 1603, 4to; and with new title-page 'The Union of Great Britaine, &c., 1604, 4to.
- Assertiones Theologicae pro vera Verae Ecclesiae nota, &c., Rupellae (Rochelle), 1603, 8vo.
- Echo. Dialogus de Institutione Principis: ad Henricum Fredericum Stuardum, &c., Paris, 1603, 4to (elegiacs, in which the last word of the pentameter is an echo).
- Elizabethae Reginae Manes, &c., London, 1604, 4to (hexameters, addressed to James I)
- England's and Scotland's Happinesse, &c., 1604, 4to.
- Enotikon Or a Sermon of the Vnion of Great Brittannie...by Ione Gordovn Deane of Sarum, the 28 day of October...at Whitehall, &c., 1604, 4to (his first publication as dean).
- Papa-Cacus, sive Elegia Hortative... Et Dicastichon in Iesuitas, &c., 1610, 4to (the title anticipates Bunyan's 'Giant Pope')
- Antitortobellarminus, &c., 1610, 4to (in reply to Cardinal Bellarmin, who wrote as Matthaeus Tortus; partly in elegiacs).
- Orthodoxoiacobus: et Papapostaticus, &c., 1611, 4to.
- Anti-bellarmino-tortor, siue Tortus Retortus, &c., 1612, 4to (proves kissing the pope's toe to be a piece of Arianism).
- Εἰρηνοκοινωνία. The Peace of the ...Chvrch of England, &c., 1612, 4to (defence of some of the ceremonies).
- Παρασκενή, sive Praeparatio ad... decisionem controversiarum de ... cultu, & c., 1612, 4to (against the cultus of saints).
- The sacred Doctrine of Divinitie gathered out of the Word of God, &c., 1613, 4to, 2 vols.

According to John Strype, he wrote (1571) 'a book in Latin' defending Mary's rights. His discussion with Benetrius is said to have been printed.

== Family ==
In 1576 he married Antoinette (died 1591), widowed daughter of Rene de Marolles, he acquired an estate which gave him the style of "Sieur of Longorme". By his first wife he had a son Armand Claude, who was wounded at Pavia, and died on his way to Scotland; George, who died in the college of Beauvais; and two daughters who died young. C. A. Gordon, who gives a somewhat questionable pedigree of the descendants of Armand Claude, says that he had his first name from Cardinal Richelieu, his godfather; if so, he must have received catholic baptism rather late in life.

Gordon's second wife Genevieve Petau de Maulette taught French to Princess Elizabeth (1596–1662), afterwards queen of Bohemia. She died at Gordonstoun, Morayshire, on 6 December 1643, in her eighty-third year, and was buried at the Michael Kirk in the old churchyard of Oggston, parish of Drainie, Moray. Their daughter Lucie (or Louise), born 20 December 1597, was brought up with Princess Elizabeth in Lord Harington's household at Coombe Abbey. She married the family historian Sir Robert Gordon (1580–1656) in February 1613, and died in September 1680, aged 83. Their daughter Katherine was mother of Robert Barclay, the apologist.

Religious titles
Preceded by Alexander Gordon	Bishop of Galloway; 1575–1586	Succeeded by George Gordon
Preceded by Alexander Gordon	Commendator of Tongland; 1576–1586	Succeeded by George Gordon
