= Sir Robert Gordon, 1st Baronet =

17th-century Scottish politician and historian

Sir Robert Gordon, Bt
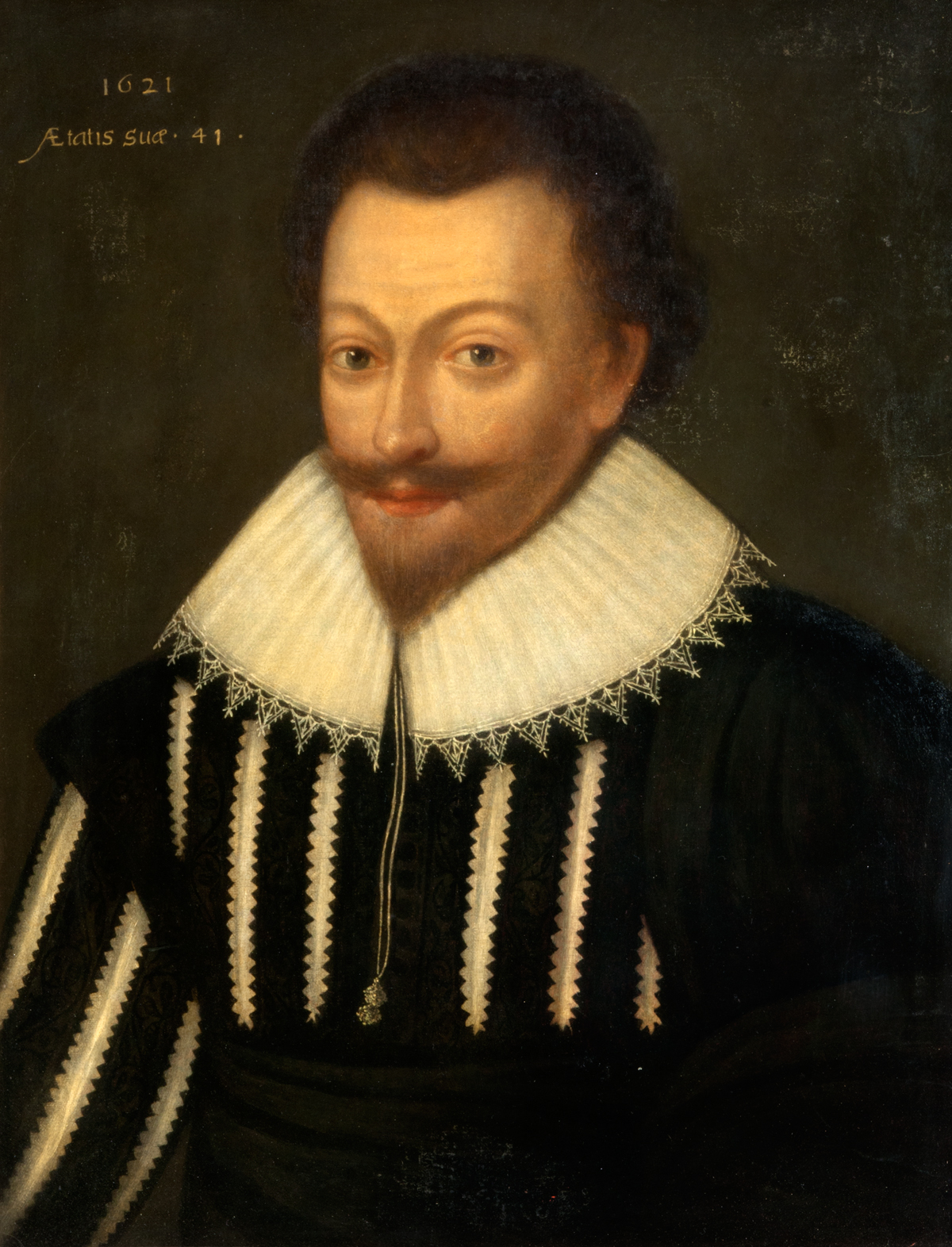
- Portrait of Sir Robert Gordon, 1621
- Born: 14 May 1580; Dunrobin Castle, Golspie, Sutherland
- Died: 1656
- Education: University of St. Andrews
- Spouse: Louise Gordon (after 1613)
- Children: 9
- Parent(s): Alexander Gordon, 12th Earl of Sutherland; Jean Gordon, Countess of Bothwell
- Relatives: John Gordon, 13th Earl of Sutherland (brother); Sir Robert Gordon, 3rd Baronet (grandson)

Sir Robert Gordon of Gordonstoun (14 May 1580 – 1656) was a Scottish politician and courtier, known as the historian of the noble house of Sutherland.

== Early life ==
Born at Dunrobin Castle, Golspie, Sutherland, on 14 May 1580, he was the fourth son of Alexander Gordon, 12th Earl of Sutherland, by his second wife Jean Gordon, Countess of Bothwell (a daughter of George Gordon, 4th Earl of Huntly).

In 1598 he was sent to the University of St. Andrews, where he remained six months, and then finished his education at the University of Edinburgh. In January 1603 he went to France to study civil law, and remained there until October 1605.

== Career ==
Gordon was appointed a gentleman of the privy chamber to James I in 1606, and was knighted. He won a prize in the tournament at the Barriers in January 1610.

On 16 July 1614 he received a grant of holdings in Ulster. In March 1614–15, having attended the king to Cambridge, he was created honorary M.A. On the death of his brother John, 12th or 13th Earl of Sutherland, in September of the same year, he became tutor at law of his nephew John Gordon, 13th Earl of Sutherland.

In 1617, King James visited Scotland for the first time after his accession to the English throne. Among the entertainments was a competition of archery in the garden of Holyrood Palace, at which Gordon gained the prize, a silver arrow. He remained in Scotland for some time, and having settled his affairs in Sutherland, he returned with his family to England in November 1619. In May 1620 he revisited France and disposed of his property of Longorme to Walter Stewart. The Duke of Lennox wrote to him in Paris, asking him to buy a dozen masks and a dozen gloves for gentlewomen, engaging the help of Madame de Gie and the Marquise de Vermont if possible.

In 1621, he returned to Sutherland, when he relieved the estates of the earl of a heavy burden of debt. In 1623, when George Sinclair, 5th Earl of Caithness was proclaimed a rebel, and fled to the Orkney Islands, Gordon received a commission from the privy council to proceed with fire and sword against him, and took possession of Castle Sinclair, the earl's residence. Having subdued the county of Caithness, he returned with his troops into Sutherland, and soon after went back to the court in England (and probably on to France).

In 1624, Gordon was appointed one of the commissioners of the estates of the young Duke of Lennox, and two years later one of the duke's curators. Gordon was present at the private burial of King James at midnight on 5 May 1625 with the Earl of Kellie and Francis Stuart.

On 28 May 1625, then a gentleman of the privy chamber to Charles I, he was created premier baronet of Nova Scotia, with remainder to his heir male whatsoever; and he obtained a charter under the great seal granting to him sixteen thousand acres on the coast of Nova Scotia, which were erected into a barony. He assisted under agreement Sir William Alexander of Menstrie in the plantation of a colony in Nova Scotia. A favourite of King Charles, he was employed as confidential messenger to Henrietta Maria.

In August 1629, Gordon was chosen sheriff principal of Inverness-shire, and represented the shire at the convention of 1630. In May 1630 he was sent by the lords of the council along with Sir William Seton into the north to quell some disturbances. On 13 July in the same year James, Duke of Lennox, as lord high chamberlain of Scotland, appointed him his vice-chamberlain during his absence in France. At the coronation of Charles I in Scotland in 1633, he, as vice-chamberlain, with four earls' sons, carried the king's train from the castle to the abbey. The next year he was placed on the privy council in Scotland.

On 1 May 1639, Gordon was with the court at Durham; during the First English Civil War acted as a mediator between the opposing parties. The gentry of Morayshire in 1643 appointed him, along with Thomas McKenzie of Pluscarden and John Innes of Leuchars, to confer with the Marquis of Montrose. His mother was persecuted as a Roman Catholic, and towards the end of her days excommunicated; in 1627 Gordon, to have the sentence relaxed, undertook a formal bond to the Bishop of Caithness that his mother would shun Catholic priests, and his own orthodoxy was probably suspect. In 1646, however, the presbytery of Elgin granted a testimonial in his favour. Gordon died in 1656.

=== Works ===
His father-in-law Bishop Gordon, at his death in September 1619, left to Gordon the task of publishing his works, in English and Latin.

Gordon's Genealogical History of the Earldom of Sutherland, from its Origin to the year 1630 (with a continuation to 1651 by Gilbert Gordon of Sallach) was edited by Henry William Weber from the original manuscript held by the Marchioness of Stafford, later Duchess of Sutherland, and published at Edinburgh, 1813. A catalogue of Gordon's library was published in 1816; and the documents he collected, including his will dated 11 July 1654, were detailed in the 6th Report of the Historical Manuscripts Commission. Some were printed at length in Edward Dunbar Dunbar, Social Life in Former Days, two series, 1865–6.

== Personal life ==
Gordon married at London, 16 February 1613, Louise, or Lucie, born 20 December 1597, only child of John Gordon and Genevieve Petau de Maulette who taught French to Princess Elizabeth (1596–1662), afterwards queen of Bohemia, and received the lordships of Glenluce in Scotland and of Longorme in France. He had issue five sons and four daughters, including:

- Sir Ludovick Gordon (1614–1685), who married Elizabeth Farquhar, daughter and coheiress of Sir Robert Farquhar of Mounie.
- Katherine Gordon (1621–1683), who married to Col. David Barclay.

He was the founder of the Morayshire family of Gordonstoun. Having acquired various estates in the shires of Elgin and Forres, he had them all united into the barony of Gordonstoun, by a charter under the great seal, dated 20 June 1642.

His daughter Elizabeth Gordon was born at Salisbury in January 1617. The Earl of Hertford was a godfather, Lucy Russell, Countess of Bedford; and Jean Drummond, Countess of Roxburghe were godmothers.

=== Will and estate ===
Gordon's bequests included; to his eldest son Ludovick, his insignia as a knight baronet; to Ludovick's son Robert Gordon, a cup, his whalebone chessmen, and a suite of furniture of a green bed and couch worked in tent stitch made by his mother-in-law Genevieve Petau; to his grandson Robert Barclay his silver coins; his wife Louise Gordon should leave the diamond jewel with the portrait of King James, that had belonged to her mother (Geneviève Petau de Maulette) who taught French to Elizabeth Stuart, Queen of Bohemia, to Ludovick and his son; his wife and Ludovick should continue building the church of Drenie, especially because they had demolished the church of Kinneddor.

== Notes ==
Attribution

This article incorporates text from a publication now in the public domain: Stephen, Leslie; Lee, Sidney, eds. (1890). "Gordon, Robert (1580-1656)". Dictionary of National Biography. Vol. 22. London: Smith, Elder & Co.

Baronetage of Nova Scotia
New creation	Baronet (of Gordonstoun); 1625–1656	Succeeded by Ludovick Gordon
