= List of castles in South Lanarkshire =

This is a list of castles in South Lanarkshire.

== List ==
| Name | Type | Date | Condition | Ownership | Location | Notes | Picture |
|---|---|---|---|---|---|---|---|
| Biggar Castle | Motte and bailey | | Ruin | | Biggar | | |
| Boghouse Castle | | | No remains | | Crawfordjohn | | |
| Bothwell Castle | Castle of enceinte | 13th century | Ruin | Historic Scotland | Bothwell; NS6881559345 | | Great Hall and South East Tower seen from the Donjon |
| Cadzow Castle | | 1500–1550 | Ruin | Historic Scotland | Chatelherault Country Park; NS735537 | Rebuilt as a folly in the 18th century | Cadzow Castle seen across the Avon Gorge from the Duke's Bridge |
| Calderwood Castle | | 14th century | No remains | N/a | Long Calderwood, East Kilbride | Demolished in 1955 | |
| Carstairs Castle | | 12th century | No remains | | Carstairs; NS93954619 | | |
| Craignethan Castle | | 1500–1550 | Ruin | Historic Scotland | Crossford; NS816464 | | |
| Crawford Castle | | | Ruin | | Crawford; NS954213 | Also known as Lindsay Tower | |
| Crawfordjohn Castle | | | No remains | | Crawfordjohn, | | |
| Douglas Castle | | | Ruin | | Douglas; NS8430031801 | Only a single tower of the 17th-century castle remains. Also known as Castle Dangerous | |
| Drumsagard Castle | | | Ruin | | Cambuslang | | |
| Eddlewood Castle | | | Ruin | | | | |
| Farme Castle | Keep and courtyard | 15th century | No remains | n/a | Rutherglen | Demolished in the 1960s | |
| Gilbertfield Castle | Tower house | 1607 | Ruin | Private | Cambuslang; NS652587 | | |
| Tower of Hallbar | Tower house | 16th century | Restored as holiday accommodation | Vivat Trust | Braidwood; NS8393547121 | | |
| Kilbride Castle | Keep and courtyard | 12th century | Ruin | | East Kilbride | | |
| Lanark Castle | | Unknown | No remains | | Lanark; NS8790643297 | Kenneth II held at least one parliament at Lanark Castle in 978. It played an important role in the Scottish Wars of Independence, being where William Wallace first drew his sword against the English. | |
| Lamington Tower | Tower house | 16th century | Ruin | | Lamington | | |
| Lee Castle | Historic House | | Occupied as a residence | Private | Lanark; NS8541546503 | Parts date from the 13th century | Drawing of Lee Place in 1830 |
| Mains Castle | Tower house | 15th century | Occupied as a residence | Private | East Kilbride | | |
| Roberton Castle | Motte and bailey | 12th century | Ruin | | Roberton | | |
| Rutherglen Castle | | 13th century | No remains | n/a | Rutherglen | Destroyed in 1569 | |
| Strathaven Castle | Tower house | 14th century | Ruin | | Strathaven; NS703445 | Free access | |
| Tarbrax Castle | | | No remains | n/a | Tarbrax | | |

== See also ==
- Castles in Scotland
- List of castles in Scotland
- List of listed buildings in South Lanarkshire
