= List of castles in the Outer Hebrides =

This is a list of castles in the Outer Hebrides, Scotland

== List ==
Name	Type	Date	Condition	Ownership	Location	Notes	Picture
Amhuinnsuidhe Castle	Historic house	1865	Occupied	Amhuinnsuidhe Castle Estate	Harris; NB049078		
Ardvourlie Castle	Historic house	1863	Occupied	Private	Harris; NB189105		
Borve Castle	Tower house	14th century	Ruined		Benbecula; NF773505		
Calvay Castle		Uncertain	Ruined	The local community through Stòras Uibhist	Calvay Island, Loch Boisdale, South Uist; NF810126	Bonnie Prince Charlie hid here in June 1746, while fleeing from the Duke of Cumberland's troops after the Battle of Culloden.	
Kisimul Castle	Tower house	c. late 15th century	Restored	Private; leased to Historic Scotland	Castlebay, Barra; NL665979	Open to public	
Lews Castle	Historic house	19th century	Occupied	Comhairle nan Eilean Siar	Stornoway, Lewis; NB419331	Category A listed building	
Ormacleit Castle	Historic house	Early 18th century	Ruined		South Uist; NF740318	Burned in 1715	

== See also ==
- Castles in Scotland
- List of castles in Scotland
- List of listed buildings in the Outer Hebrides
