= List of castles in East Lothian =

This is a list of castles in East Lothian, Scotland.

== List ==
Name	Type	Date	Condition	Ownership	Location	Notes	Picture
Auldhame Castle	tower house	16th century	Ruin		Seacliff NT602847		
Ballencrieff Castle	tower house	1507, 1586	Restored	Private; next to pig farm	Ballencrieff NT487783		
Barnes Castle	uncompleted castle		Ruin		Haddington; NT529766	Extensive castle planned, but never completed above the vaults.	
The Bass	curtain wall & keep	16th century	Ruin	Open for visitors (via boat trip)	Bass Rock; NT602873	later adapted for artillery; stone used to build lighthouse	
Black Castle			No remains		Cockburnspath; NT738707	some remains existed until c. 1800	
Byres Castle		13th century	No remains				
Dirleton Castle	fortress	13th century	Partly ruined	Historic Scotland	Dirleton; NT518840		
Dunbar Castle			Ruin		Dunbar; NT67827930		
Fa'side Castle	Tower house (altered keep)	15th century	Restored 1970s	Private	Tranent; NT378710	Also known as Faside, Fawside and Falside	
Fenton Tower	Tower house	1587	Restored	Private	North Berwick; NT543822	In use as a hotel, also featured on Balamory	
Gamelshiel Castle	Tower house	14th century	Ruin		Lammermuir Hills NT649648		
Garleton Castle	Courtyard castle	16th century	Partially occupied	Private	Haddington; NT509767	Partially restored with remaining part ruined	
Hailes Castle	Keep & ranges	14th century	Ruin	Historic Scotland	East Linton; NT575758	Ranges and towers 15th-16th century	
Innerwick Castle		14th century	Ruin		Innerwick		
Keith Marischal			Occupied				
Kilspindie Castle			Ruin				
Lennoxlove			Occupied	Duke of Hamilton		Open to the public	
Luffness Castle	Tower house	16th century	Altered	Private	Aberlady; NT476804	castle on site from 13th century	
Markle Castle	Tower house	14th century	Ruin		NT57957754		
Ormiston Castle	Tower house	16th century	Ruin				
Penshiel Tower			Ruin				
Preston Tower	keep	15th century	Ruin	NTS; free access (exterior view & garden & doocot)	Prestonpans, next to Hamilton House; NT393742	Two storeys added in 17th century. Currently in council-maintained grounds.	
Redhouse Castle	courtyard castle	16th century	Ruin	Free access through market garden	Longniddry; NT463770		
Saltcoats Castle	Courtyard castle	16th century	Ruin		Gullane		
Saltoun Hall or Castle	Elizabethan house	16th century	Occupied	Private	Pencaitland; NT461685	building incorporates remnants of 12th-century castle	
Smeaton House	Courtyard castle	15th century	Modified	Private	Inveresk	Now part of a farm	
Stoneypath Tower	tower house	16th century	Restored		Nunraw Abbey; NT596713		
Tantallon Castle	courtyard castle	14th century	Ruin	Historic Scotland	North Berwick; NT596851		
Tranent Tower	Tower house	16th century	Ruin		Tranent		
Waughton Castle		14th century	Ruin		Whitekirk		
Whittingehame Tower	keep	15th century	Occupied	Balfour family	East Linton; NT602733		
Yester Castle	Castle & keep	13th century	Ruin	Private	Gifford; NT556667	Includes an underground vault known as the Goblin Ha'	Vaulted entrance to Yester Castle

== See also ==
- Castles in Scotland
- List of castles in Scotland
- List of listed buildings in East Lothian
