= List of castles in Aberdeen =

This is a list of castles in Aberdeen, Scotland.

== List ==
Name	Type	Date	Condition	Ownership	Location	Notes	Picture
Aberdeen Castle	Unknown	13th century	No remains	N/A	Aberdeen; NJ945064	Destroyed June 1308	
Benholm's Lodging	Unknown	17th century	Reconstruction	Aberdeen City Council	Aberdeen; NJ9355608924	Previously at Nethergate, Aberdeen	Wallace Tower, Seaton Park - geograph.org.uk - 221403
Mar's Castle	Unknown	medieval	No remains	N/A	NJ94110676	The original castle was built by the Stewart Earls of Mar	

== See also ==
- Castles in Scotland
- List of castles in Scotland
- List of listed buildings in Aberdeen
