= List of castles in Dundee =

This is a list of castles in Dundee, Scotland.

== List ==
Name	Type	Date	Condition	Ownership	Location	Notes	Picture
Broughty Castle	Tower house	15th century	In use as a museum	Dundee City Council	Broughty Ferry; NO463303		
Claypotts Castle	Z-plan tower house	16th century	Preserved	Historic Scotland	NO451319		
Dudhope Castle	Extended tower house	15th century	In use as offices	Dundee City Council	Law; NO393306		
Dundee Castle		12th century	No remains		Dundee		
Mains Castle	Courtyard castle	16th century	Preserved	Private	NO410330	also known as Claverhouse Castle and Fintry Castle	
Powrie Castle	Z-plan tower house	16th century	Ruined	Private	NO420345	17th century wing restored	16th-century south wing of Powrie Castle

== See also ==
- Castles in Scotland
- List of castles in Scotland
- List of listed buildings in Dundee
