= List of castles in Fife =

This is a list of castles in Fife, Scotland.

== List ==
Name	Type	Date	Condition	Ownership	Location	Notes	Picture
Aberdour Castle	Tower house with later extensions	c.1200–1635	Partially ruined	Historic Environment Scotland	NT1915385458	built by Douglas earls of Morton; painted ceiling	
Airdit House					NO41242003		
Airdre Castle							
Aithernie Castle							
Ardross Castle, Fife		c.14th century					
Ayton Castle, Fife							
Balgonie Castle							
Ballinbreich Castle			Ruin	Private	056.37ºN 003.18ºW		
Balwearie Castle			Ruin	Nr Kirkcaldy			
Collairnie Castle				Private	056.34ºN 003.12ºW	Barclay family, heraldic painted ceilings	
Couston Castle					NT168850		
Craighall Castle							
Dairsie Castle				Private			
Denmylne Castle			Ruin	Private		Balfour family	
Dunimarle Castle	Historic house	18th century	Occupied	Private	Culross NS976858	Earlier ruin in grounds	
Earlshall Castle	Historic House					Bruce family, painted gallery	
Falkland Palace	Historic House			National Trust for Scotland		Royal palace, painted ceiling	
Fernie Castle				Private			
Fordell Castle				Private		Henderson family	
Hallyards Castle			Ruin			Kirkcaldy family	
Kellie Castle	Historic House			National Trust for Scotland		Oliphant & Erskine family	
Leuchars Castle			Ruin				
Lochore Castle	Castle	14th century	Ruin		Lochore		
Lordscairnie Castle			Ruin	Private			
Macduff's Castle			Ruin				
Myres Castle				Private		Scrimgeour family	
Newark Castle			Ruin				
Pittarthie Castle			Ruin	Nr Dunino			
Piteadie Castle			Ruin	Nr Kinghorn			
Pitreavie Castle	tower house				Nr Dunfermline	Wardlaw family	
Ravenscraig Castle		mid-15th century	Ruin	Historic Scotland	Kirkcaldy	Sinclair family, in the grounds of Ravenscraig Park	
Rossend Castle	tower			private offices		Dury & Melville families painted ceiling in National Museum of Scotland	
Rosyth Castle			Ruin	in Naval dockyard			
Rumgally House	tower house	16th century		no access,			
St Andrews Castle			Ruin	Historic Scotland			
Scotstarvit Tower				Historic Scotland			
Wemyss Castle	Historic House			Private			

== See also ==
- Castles in Scotland
- List of castles in Scotland
- List of listed buildings in Fife
