= List of castles in East Dunbartonshire =

This is a list of castles in East Dunbartonshire, Scotland.

== List ==
Name	Type	Date	Condition	Ownership	Location	Notes	Picture
Bardowie Castle	Tower house	16th century	Restored	Private	Bardowie, by Milngavie; NS580738		
Craigend Castle	Castellated mansion	1812	Ruin	East Dunbartonshire Council	Mugdock Country Park; NS545778	Built on the site of an older castle	
Lennox Castle	Castellated mansion	1841	Ruin		Lennoxtown NS604783		

== See also ==
- Castles in Scotland
- List of castles in Scotland
- List of listed buildings in East Dunbartonshire
