= List of castles in East Renfrewshire =

This is a list of castles in East Renfrewshire, Scotland.

== List ==
Name	Type	Date	Condition	Ownership	Location	Notes	Picture
Caldwell Castle			One inhabited tower remains	Private	Near Uplawmoor	Recently restored	
Mearns Castle	Tower house	15th century	Restored as a church	Church of Scotland	Newton Mearns NS552553		
Polnoon Castle	Tower house	14th century	Total ruin	Private	Near Eaglesham 55°44'01.34"N 4°15'19.25"W		

== See also ==
- Castles in Scotland
- List of castles in Scotland
- List of listed buildings in East Renfrewshire
