= List of castles in Edinburgh =

This is a list of castles in Edinburgh, Scotland.

== List ==
Name	Type	Date	Condition	Ownership	Location	Notes	Picture
Barnbougle Castle	Tower house	1881			NT168784	There was a castle at Barnbougle as early as the 13th century, though this was replaced by "a plain 17th-century building". The home of the Earl of Rosebery, Barnbougle was eventually replaced by nearby Dalmeny House in 1817. It was partially destroyed in an accidental explosion and left as a ruin until 1881, when the 5th Earl had it rebuilt to house his library. The restored building, which incorporates fragments of the 17th-century castle on its north wall, remains an occupied residence. Category A listed building.	
Bavelaw Castle	Fortified house	16th century			NT167626	The nucleus of Bavelaw is a 16th-century tower which may have been a hunting lodge used by Queen Mary and James VI. The present house largely dates from the 17th century, after Bavelaw was granted to Laurence Scott of Harperrig. The building was restored around 1900 by Robert Lorimer. Category A listed building.	
Craigcrook Castle	Tower house	17th century			NT21067427	Craigcrook was built by the Adamson family in the 17th century, though the internal vaulting suggests this may have been a rebuild of an earlier tower. In the 19th century Craigcrook was the home of Lord Jeffrey, editor of the Edinburgh Review. The building was extended in the 19th century, by architect William Henry Playfair. It was converted to offices in the 20th century, and in March 2014 it was being offered for sale. Category A listed building.	
Craiglockhart Castle	Tower house	15th century			NT226703	Craiglockhart Castle was a square tower house, built in the 15th century by the Lockharts of Lee. Only the vaulted ground floor and parts of the first floor remain. Scheduled monument,	
Craigmillar Castle	Keep & later ranges	14th–17th centuries			NT288709	Craigmillar was granted to Sir Simon Preston in 1374. The earliest part of Craigmillar is the central tower house or keep, built in the late 14th or early 15th century. This was successively added to in the 15th and 16th centuries by the Preston family with a curtain wall and ranges of chambers. The castle was burned by the English in 1543 during the Rough Wooing. Mary, Queen of Scots, stayed at Craigmillar in the 16th century. In 1660 the castle was acquired by the Gilmours, who modernised the west range and lived there until the early 18th century. Craigmillar has been a ruin since at least 1775, and has been in state care since 1946. Scheduled monument, Historic Environment Scotland property.	
Cramond Tower	Tower house	15th century			NT189767	This square-plan tower was built at the end of the 15th century for the Bishops of Dunkeld. It later passed to the Douglas family then to James Inglis, who extended the tower and installed larger windows. In 1680 Cramond House was built nearby to replace the tower, which was subsequently abandoned, falling into ruin by the 19th century. It was restored as a home in 1979–1981 and remains a private residence.	Category B listed building.
Dundas Castle	Tower house with later mansion	15th century			NT116767	The Dundas family held these lands from the 12th century. The tower house was built in the early 15th century and was besieged in 1449. Later embellishments include the 16th-century parapet. In the early 19th century the tower was used as a brewery or distillery, after the adjacent country house was built in 1818 to a Tudor Gothic design by William Burn. It was used as a barrage balloon base during the Second World War. The house was restored in the 1990s by the present owner, former MEP Sir Jack Stewart-Clark. The tower is a category A listed building. The 19th-century house is separately listed at category A.	
Edinburgh Castle	Royal fortress	12th-21st century			NT252735	Site of a castle since the 12th century, Edinburgh Castle contains buildings of multiple periods and functions, including the royal palace, great hall, and 19th-century barracks.	
Inchgarvie Castle	Tower house	15th century			NT138795		
Lauriston Castle	Tower house with later mansion	16th century			NT204762	The original tower was extended in the 19th century. Now owned by City of Edinburgh Council and still in use.	
Lennox Tower	Tower house	15th century	Ruin		NT172669		
Liberton Tower	Tower house	17th century			NT267694	Still occupied as a residence	
Merchiston Castle	Tower house	15th century			NT243717	Now part of Napier University buildings	

== See also ==
- Castles in Scotland
- List of castles in Scotland
- List of listed buildings in Edinburgh
