= List of castles in North Ayrshire =

This is a list of castles in North Ayrshire, Scotland.

== List ==
Name	Type	Date	Condition	Ownership	Location	Notes	Picture
Ailsa Craig Castle	Tower		Ruin	Private	Off Girvan		
Ardrossan Castle			Ruin		Ardrossan	Accessible to the public	
Auchenharvie Castle			Ruin	Private	Near Torranyard	A dangerous site	
Hill of Beith Castle	Tower	17th century	Foundations only	Private	Beith	Demolished in the 1750s	Foundations of Hill of Beith Castle
Broadstone Castle			No remains	Private	Beith	Demolished in 1850 to build the nearby farm	
Brodick Castle	Historic House			National Trust for Scotland	Isle of Arran		
Clonbeith Castle			Ruin	Private farm	Near Auchentiber		Clonbeith Castle doorway
Cloncaird Castle			Historic Castle	Private	by Maybole		
Cunninghamhead Castle			No remains	Private	Near Irvine		
Eglinton Castle			Ruin	North Ayrshire Council	Irvine	Now Eglinton Country Park	Eglinton Castle in the 1920s
Fairlie Castle	Tower	15th century	Ruin	Private	Fairlie		
Giffen castle			No remains	Private	Near Barrmill	Parts of it are incorporated into Barrmill Mill	
Glengarnock Castle	Tower		Ruin	Private	Kilbirnie		
Hessilhead Castle			Scant remains	Private	Near Lugton	A Wildlife Rescue Centre occupies part of the old estate	Hessilhead Castle in the 1800s
Hunterston Castle	Tower	13th century	Intact & Furnished	Private	West Kilbride	Paid tours available	Hunterston Castle
Kelburn Castle						Castle open	
Kerelaw Castle			Ruin	North Ayrshire Council	Saltcoats	Fenced off - dangerous	
Kersland Castle	Tower	15th century	Ruin	Private	Near Dalry	Located at Easter Kersland Farm	
Kilbirnie Place	Tower	14th century	Ruin	Private	Near Kilbirnie	On a golf course	
Kildonan Castle		13th century					
Law Castle		15th century					
Little Cumbrae Castle	Tower	16th century	Ruin	Private	Near Cumbrae Island		
Lochranza Castle (Arran Island)				Historic Scotland	Lochranza NR935505		
Monkcastle			Ruin	Private	Near Kilwinning		
Montfode Castle	Fortified tower	16th century	Mostly demolished	Private	Near Ardrossan	One tower and a short section of wall remain	Montfode Castle
Montgreenan Castle			Ruin	Private	Near Kilwinning	Montgreenan House is nearby. Also known as the 'Bishop's Palace'	Foundations of the 'Bishop's Palace'
Pitcon	Fortified tower		Demolished	Private	Near Dalry	An 18th-century mansion is now present near the site	
Portencross Castle							Portencross Castle in 1900
Roughwood Tower	Fortified tower	15th century	Demolished	Private	Near Beith	A farm with old outbuildings is on the site	Roughwood Tower
Seagate Castle	Fortified townhouse	16th century	Ruin	North Ayrshire Council	In Irvine	access on Doors Open Days only	
Shewalton Castle	Fortified tower		Demolished	Private	Irvine	The castle was demolished in 1806 and a mansion house built on the site, also now demolished.	
Skelmorlie Castle	Tower	16th century	Inhabited	Private	Near Largs	Much altered	Skelmorlie Castle in the 1880s
Stanecastle			Substantial ruin	North Ayrshire Council	Stanecastle, Irvine	Accessible and well maintained	

== See also ==
- Castles in Scotland
- List of castles in Scotland
- List of listed buildings in North Ayrshire
