= List of castles in Falkirk (council area) =

This is a list of castles in the Falkirk council area, Scotland.

== List ==
Name	Type	Date	Condition	Ownership	Location	Notes	Picture
Airth Castle	Historic house	16th century	Occupied	Private	Airth	Incorporates a 16th-century tower house and is now used as a hotel	
Almond Castle	Tower house		Ruin	Private	Whitecross	Within an industrial estate	
Blackness Castle		15th century	Preserved	Historic Scotland	Blackness	Open to the public	
Castle Cary Castle	Tower house	15th century	Occupied	Private	Castlecary	Still in use as a residence	
Elphinstone Tower	Tower house	15th century	Ruin	Private	Dunmore	Part of the Dunmore Park estate, later used as a mausoleum	
Herbertshire Castle		circa 1407	No remains	n/a	Dunipace	Demolished 1950	
Kinneil House	Historic house	1677	Preserved	Falkirk Council	Bo'ness	Built around 15th-century tower house, contains 16th-century murals	
Torwood Castle		1566	Ruin	Torwood Castle Trust	Torwood	Undergoing restoration	

== See also ==
- Castles in Scotland
- List of castles in Scotland
- List of listed buildings in Falkirk (council area)
