= List of castles in West Dunbartonshire =

This is a list of castles in West Dunbartonshire, Scotland.

== List ==
Name	Type	Date	Condition	Ownership	Location	Notes	Picture
Dumbarton Castle	Garrison fortress	17th-18th century			Dumbarton; NS398744	The site was the centre of the Kingdom of Strathclyde. Scheduled monument. Open to public.	
Dunglass Castle		15th century			Bowling; NS436734	Partially demolished for building stone 1735. Later house remains on the site.	
Balloch Castle	Castellated house	1809			Balloch; NS390830	Ruins of the original medieval castle still remain.	
Inchmurrin Castle		14th century			Inchmurrin; NS 3730 8630	Built by the Earls of Lennox.	
Boturich Castle	Castellated house	1835			By Loch Lomond; NS 3875 8456	Built on the ruins of an older castle.	
Tullichewan Castle	Castellated house	19th century			Tullichewan; NS 3815 8112	Demolished	
Kilmaronock Castle	Tower house	15th century			Gartocharn; NS 4550 8771	The remains of a tower house of the late 15th or early 16th century, Kilmaronock was the property of the Earl of Glencairn in 1695.	

== See also ==
- Castles in Scotland
- List of castles in Scotland
- List of listed buildings in West Dunbartonshire
