= List of castles in Midlothian =

This is a list of castles in Midlothian, Scotland.

== List ==
Name	Type	Date	Condition	Ownership	Location	Notes	Picture
Borthwick Castle	Tower house	1430	Occupied	Private	Gorebridge NT370597	In use as a hotel	
Crichton Castle	Courtyard castle	14th century	Preserved	Historic Scotland	Gorebridge NT380612	Open to the public	
Cousland Castle	Tower house	15th century	Ruined	Private	Cousland NT376683	Ruins of a tower house and later walled garden	
Dalhousie Castle	Historic house	16th century	Occupied	Private	Bonnyrigg NT320636	Incorporates remains of 13th-century tower, now used as a hotel	
Dalkeith Palace	Historic house	18th century	Occupied	Duke of Buccleuch	Dalkeith NT333679	Incorporates remains of 12th-century castle Now leased to the University of Wisconsin. Grounds open to the public	
Hawthornden Castle	Tower house	17th century	Occupied	Private	Lasswade NT287637	Incorporates ruined 15th-century keep Now used as a writers' retreat	
Melville Castle	Castellated mansion	18th century	Restored	Private	Lasswade NT310669	Built on site of earlier castle Now in use as a hotel	
Newbattle Abbey	Fortified house	17th century	Altered	Newbattle Abbey College	Dalkeith NT333660	Part of a former Cistercian Abbey, now a college	
Roslin Castle	Keep & ranges	14th century	Keep is a ruin, later ranges occupied	Earl of Rosslyn	Roslin NT274628	Ranges date from 15th-16th century Leased to the Landmark Trust as holiday accommodation. Used in the film 'The Da Vinci Code' with Tom Hanks.	

== See also ==
- Castles in Scotland
- List of castles in Scotland
- List of listed buildings in Midlothian
