= Colliston Castle =

Stately home in Scotland

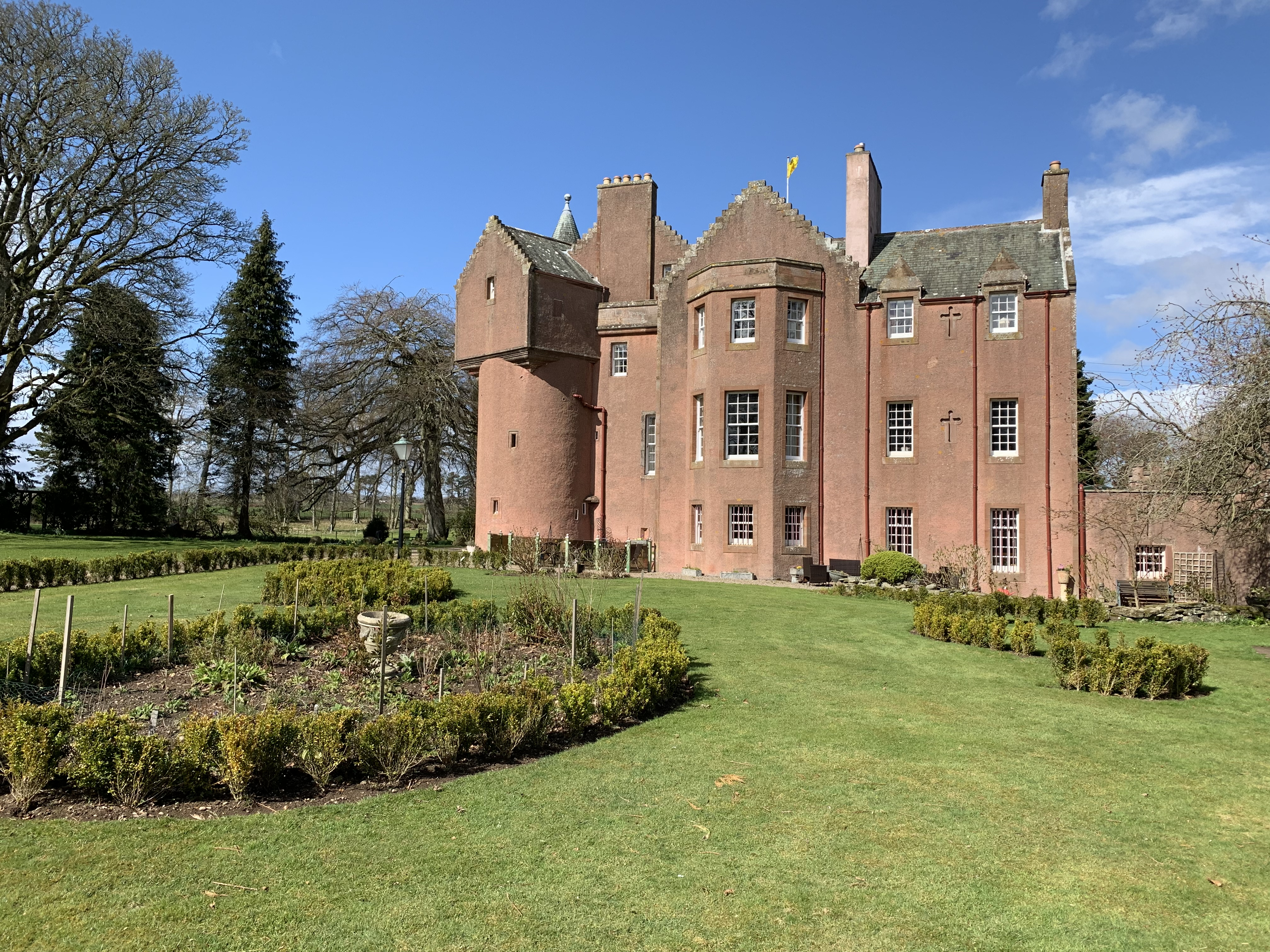
- The castle in 2023

Location
- Coordinates: 56.6080°N 2.6328°W

Site history
- Built: 16th century

Colliston Castle is a 16th-century Z-plan tower house, altered and extended in the 18th and 19th centuries. It is located 6 kilometres (3.7 mi) north of Arbroath, in Angus, Scotland, and remains occupied.

== History ==
Colliston was part of the lands of Arbroath Abbey from its foundation in the 12th century. On 25 July 1544, David Beaton, Abbot of Arbroath and Archbishop of St Andrews, granted the lands of Colliston, Knives, Park of Conon, and Guthrie Hill, to John Guthrie and his wife Isobel Ogilvie. Colliston was retained by the Guthries until the late 17th century, when it passed to the Gordon family. By 1820, George Chaplin was in possession of Colliston, and was succeeded by his nephew George Robertson Chaplin of Auchengray, and then George Chaplin Child Chaplin, M.D. He died in 1883, and was succeeded by Mr Peebles of Somerset House, London. It was purchased in 1920 by Major R.F.D. Bruce, whose wife continued to live there after his death. It was sold several times during the 20th century, and most recently in 2011. The house is currently available for holiday rentals. It is a category B listed building.

== Description ==
The original Z-plan part of the castle of Colliston bears the date 1583 (sometimes misread as 1553). It consists of a main block with two round towers projecting at opposite corners, and a stair turret rising in one of the re-entrant angles between the main block and tower. This tower, which also houses the entrance to the castle, is corbelled out at the top to form a gabled watch-chamber. The plan is similar to Claypotts Castle and is amply provided with wide splayed gun-loops and circular shot-holes for defence. The wall heads and the entire upper storey were remodelled several times and are not original. A later doorway is dated 1621, and the north and east wings were added in the 18th and 19th centuries.
