= List of castles in Clackmannanshire =

This is a list of castles in Clackmannanshire, Scotland.

== List ==
| Name | Type | Date | Condition | Ownership | Location | Notes | Picture |
|---|---|---|---|---|---|---|---|
| Alloa Tower | Tower house | 14th century | Preserved | NTS | Alloa; NS888925 | | |
| Broomhall Castle | Baronial house | 1874 | In use as a hotel | Private | Menstrie; NS854971 | | |
| Clackmannan Tower | Tower house | 14th century, with 15th century extension | Ruin | Historic Scotland | Clackmannan; NS906919 | Currently limited to exterior views only due to repair work | |
| Castle Campbell | Courtyard castle | Early 15th-century tower house, with a late 15th-century hall range | Ruin | Historic Scotland | Dollar Glen; NS961992 | Also known as Castle Gloom | |
| Menstrie Castle | Tower house | 16th century | Restored as flats | Private | Menstrie; NS849967 | Contains a museum operated by the National Trust for Scotland | |
| Sauchie Tower | Tower house | 15th century | Empty | Clackmannanshire Heritage Trust | Fishcross; NS895956 | | |

== See also ==
- Castles in Scotland
- List of castles in Scotland
- List of listed buildings in Clackmannanshire

== Bibliography ==
- Coventry, Martin (2001) The Castles of Scotland, 3rd Ed. Scotland: Goblinshead ISBN 1-899874-26-7
- Coventry, Martin (2010) Castles of the Clans Scotland: Goblinshead ISBN 1-899874-36-4
- Pattullo, Nan (1974) Castles, Houses and Gardens of Scotland Edinburgh: Denburn Press
