= List of castles in Orkney =

This is a list of castles in Orkney, Scotland.

== List ==
Name	Type	Date	Condition	Ownership	Location	Notes	Picture
Balfour Castle	Historic house	1847	Occupied	Private	Shapinsay	Built around an earlier structure	
Bishop's Palace	Tower house	12th century	Ruin	Historic Scotland	Kirkwall	Restored in the 16th century, open to the public	
Breckness Castle	Historic house	1633	Ruin	Historic Scotland	Stromness	Built by Bishop George Graham, the last bishop to build a house in Orkney	
Cubbie Roo's Castle	Castle	1145	Ruin	Historic Scotland	Wyre	Built by Kolbein Hruga, the earliest documented medieval stone castle in Scotland	
Earl's Palace, Birsay	Palace	16th century	Ruin	Historic Scotland	Birsay	Open to the public	
Earl's Palace, Kirkwall	Fortified house	17th century	Ruin	Historic Scotland	Kirkwall	Open to the public	
Kirkwall Castle	Castle	14th century	No remains	n/a	Kirkwall	Destroyed in 1614	
Noltland Castle	Tower house	16th century	Ruin	Historic Scotland	Westray	Open to the public	

== See also ==
- Castles in Scotland
- List of castles in Scotland
- List of listed buildings in Orkney
