= Crawfordjohn Castle =

Castle in South Lanarkshire, Scotland

Coordinates: 55.4955°N 3.7750°W

Crawfordjohn Castle, was a 12th-century castle, constructed by John, stepson of Baldwin de Biggar, near Crawfordjohn, South Lanarkshire, Scotland. The site of the castle has yet to be confirmed and appears to have been abandoned in the 14th century after the construction of Boghouse Castle.

Local tradition states that King James V of Scotland, built a tower, as a residence for his mistress, Elizabeth, daughter of John Carmichael of Meadowflat who was the keeper of nearby Crawford Castle, used as a hunting residence by James V.
