= List of listed buildings in Kemback, Fife =

This is a list of listed buildings in the parish of Kemback in Fife, Scotland.

== List ==
Name	Location	Date listed	Grid ref. (Note: Sometimes known as OSGB36, the grid reference (where provided) is based on the British national grid reference system used by the Ordnance Survey. • "Guide to National Grid". Ordnance Survey. • "Get-a-map". Ordnance Survey.)	Geo-coordinates	Notes	LB number (Note: Historic Environment Scotland assign a unique alphanumeric identifier to each designated site in Scotland, for listed buildings this always begins with "LB", for example "LB12345".)	Image
Blebo House, Walled Garden And Tower				56°19′12″N 2°56′01″W	Category C(S)	8870	Upload Photo
Kinnaird Farm Steading				56°20′05″N 2°56′19″W	Category C(S)	8880	Upload Photo
Yoolfield Crescent 1-5 (All Nos Except 3)				56°19′20″N 2°56′46″W	Category C(S)	8890	Upload Photo
Dura House, Walled Garden				56°19′00″N 2°57′00″W	Category C(S)	8900	Upload Photo
Kemback Beg				56°19′30″N 2°56′31″W	Category B	8905	Upload Photo
Dura Den Yoolfield Crescent K6 Telephone Kiosk At Entrance To Mill House				56°19′19″N 2°56′44″W	Category B	8917	Upload Photo
Sawmill Cottage, Kemback R Paterson				56°19′36″N 2°56′46″W	Category C(S)	13702	Upload Photo
Blebocraigs, Thornbank Farmhouse And Steading				56°19′36″N 2°55′38″W	Category C(S)	8866	Upload Photo
Blebo House, Lodge At Stables And Stables				56°19′13″N 2°56′02″W	Category C(S)	8868	Upload Photo
Kinnaird Cottage (Detached)				56°20′07″N 2°56′26″W	Category C(S)	8878	Upload Photo
Rumgally House				56°19′22″N 2°57′32″W	Category C(S)	8886	Upload Photo
Yoolfield Crescent 6-8 (All Nos)				56°19′21″N 2°56′47″W	Category C(S)	8891	Upload Photo
Yoolfield Crescent 9-12 (All Nos Except 10)				56°19′23″N 2°56′47″W	Category C(S)	8892	Upload Photo
Kemback House Gate-Piers				56°19′40″N 2°56′33″W	Category C(S)	8910	Upload Photo
Kemback Parish Church				56°19′31″N 2°56′27″W	Category B	8877	Upload another image
Kinnaird Farm House				56°20′05″N 2°56′20″W	Category C(S)	8879	Upload Photo
The Laurels, Dura Den				56°19′09″N 2°56′54″W	Category C(S)	8881	Upload Photo
Pitscottie, Rockmount				56°18′27″N 2°56′36″W	Category C(S)	8883	Upload Photo
Yoolfield Bridge, Cottage				56°19′19″N 2°56′45″W	Category C(S)	8889	Upload Photo
Grove Terrace, Dura Den				56°18′59″N 2°56′41″W	Category C(S)	8902	Upload Photo
Kemback Bridge				56°19′35″N 2°56′47″W	Category B	8906	Upload Photo
Blebo House, Lodge				56°19′15″N 2°56′03″W	Category C(S)	13700	Upload Photo
Rumgally House, Doocot				56°19′23″N 2°57′39″W	Category B	8887	Upload Photo
Kemback, Rose Cottage				56°19′25″N 2°56′36″W	Category B	8904	Upload Photo
Kemback House, Doocot				56°19′40″N 2°56′30″W	Category C(S)	8908	Upload Photo
Blebo House, Cottage At Stables				56°19′12″N 2°56′04″W	Category C(S)	8869	Upload Photo
Dura House, Lodge And Gatepiers				56°18′50″N 2°56′56″W	Category C(S)	8874	Upload Photo
Kemback House				56°19′43″N 2°56′31″W	Category C(S)	8907	Upload Photo
Pitscottie Bridge				56°18′29″N 2°56′41″W	Category C(S)	13701	Upload Photo
Kemback Beg, Priests House And Garden Walls				56°19′30″N 2°56′32″W	Category B	10799	Upload Photo
Yoolfield Bridge				56°19′19″N 2°56′45″W	Category C(S)	8888	Upload Photo
Grove House, Dura Den				56°19′00″N 2°56′43″W	Category C(S)	8901	Upload Photo
Blebo House				56°19′15″N 2°56′12″W	Category B	8867	Upload Photo
Dura House, Doocot				56°18′53″N 2°56′58″W	Category B	8873	Upload Photo
Pitscottie, Cottage Next To Rockmount Stables				56°18′29″N 2°56′37″W	Category C(S)	8885	Upload Photo
Kemback, Beadles Cottage				56°19′24″N 2°56′35″W	Category B	8903	Upload Photo
Kemback House, Sundial				56°19′42″N 2°56′31″W	Category C(S)	8912	Upload Photo
Kemback, Former School-Master's House				56°19′27″N 2°56′30″W	Category C(S)	8913	Upload Photo
Clatto House, Steading ('Clatto Cottage')				56°19′41″N 2°54′46″W	Category B	9868	Upload Photo
Denhall				56°19′29″N 2°56′48″W	Category B	8871	Upload Photo
Dura House				56°18′56″N 2°56′59″W	Category B	8872	Upload Photo
Morton Of Blebo Farmsteading				56°19′19″N 2°55′13″W	Category C(S)	8882	Upload Photo
Pitscottie, Rockmount Stables				56°18′28″N 2°56′37″W	Category C(S)	8884	Upload Photo
Kemback House, Effigy				56°19′48″N 2°56′40″W	Category B	8909	Upload Photo
Kemback House, Lodge				56°19′43″N 2°56′48″W	Category C(S)	8911	Upload Photo

== Key ==
The scheme for classifying buildings in Scotland is:

- Category A: "buildings of national or international importance, either architectural or historic; or fine, little-altered examples of some particular period, style or building type."
- Category B: "buildings of regional or more than local importance; or major examples of some particular period, style or building type, which may have been altered."
- Category C: "buildings of local importance; lesser examples of any period, style, or building type, as originally constructed or moderately altered; and simple traditional buildings which group well with other listed buildings."

In March 2016 there were 47,288 listed buildings in Scotland. Of these, 8% were Category A, and 50% were Category B, with the remaining 42% being Category C.

== See also ==
- List of listed buildings in Fife
