= List of castles in Inverclyde =

This is a list of castles in Inverclyde, Scotland.

== List ==
| Name | Type | Date | Condition | Ownership | Location | Notes | Picture |
|---|---|---|---|---|---|---|---|
| Ardgowan Castle | Tower house | Late 15th century | Ruin | Private | Inverkip | Within grounds of Ardgowan House, also known as Inverkip Castle | Ardgowan Castle |
| Castle Levan | Tower house | 14th century | Restored | Private | Gourock | Restored as a residence in the 1980s | Rear of Castle Levan |
| Castle Wemyss | Historic house | c. 1850 | No remains | n/a | Wemyss Bay | Demolished 1984 | |
| Duchal Castle | | | Ruin | | | | |
| Dunrod Castle | | | No remains | n/a | Inverkip | See Inverkip | |
| Easter Greenock Castle | Unknown | 16th century | No remains | n/a | Greenock | Demolished in the 1830s | Easter Greenock Castle in 1809 |
| Newark Castle | Tower house and adjoining mansion | 1478 | Intact | Historic Scotland | Port Glasgow | Open to the public | Newark Castle |
| Finlaystone Castle | Tower house | c. 1290 | Functional/Livable - Private & Open to Public | Seat of Clan Cunningham & Clan MacMillan | Langbank in County Inverclyde | Extensive gardens enjoyed by Queen Elizabeth II, site of the 1st Protestant Reformed communion service with Rev. John Knox, "Hang out" of poet Robert Burns | |

== See also ==
- Castles in Scotland
- List of castles in Scotland
- List of listed buildings in Inverclyde
