= List of castles in Glasgow =

This is a list of castles in Glasgow, Scotland.

== List ==
Name	Type	Date	Condition	Ownership	Location	Notes	Picture
Bishop's Castle, Glasgow			No remains		High Street, Glasgow	Demolished in the late 18th century	
Cathcart Castle		15th century	Ruined		Linn Park, Cathcart	Abandoned in the 18th century, pulled down in the 1980s	
Crookston Castle	X-plan tower house	12th century; rebuilt c. 1400	Ruined	Historic Scotland	Pollok		
Haggs Castle	Tower house	16th century	Occupied as a residence	Private	Pollokshields		
Partick Castle		1611	No remains		Partick	Demolished during the 1830s	

== See also ==
- Scottish castles
- List of castles in Scotland
- List of listed buildings in Glasgow
