= List of castles in North Lanarkshire =

This is a list of castles in North Lanarkshire, Scotland.

== List ==
Name	Type	Date	Condition	Ownership	Location	Notes	Picture
Bedlay Castle	Tower house	16th century	Occupied	Private	Chryston; NS692700	In use as a residence	
Dalzell House	Historic house	15th-19th century	Restored	Private	Motherwell; NS7601355012	Divided into apartments. Incorporates a 15th-century tower house	

== See also ==
- Castles in Scotland
- List of castles in Scotland
- List of listed buildings in North Lanarkshire
