= List of castles in Shetland =

Locations of castles in Shetland

There are few castles in Shetland, the northernmost of the Northern Isles which lie off the coast of Scotland. Shetland is well known for its prehistoric heritage including several well-preserved brochs and iron-age promontory forts, and the islands were later a centre of Viking culture. In the Middle Ages when stone castles became more common in Scotland and elsewhere, few were built in Shetland: the Royal Commission on the Ancient and Historical Monuments of Scotland record only one such site, the ruins on Castle Holm on an islet within Loch of Strom. The two surviving castles were both built around the same time, by the Stewart and Bruce families who were initially allies but later feuded with one another. The much later Vaila Tower is a 19th-century folly, elaborated by the laird of Vaila from an existing watch tower.

== List ==
Name	Type	Date	Condition	Ownership	Location	Notes	Picture
Castle Holm		12th century			Loch of Strom; HU 3953 4753	The remains of a 12th-century castle stand on this islet, linked to the shore by a causeway. The ruin measures approximately 5.5 by 6.5 metres (18 by 21 ft). It is a scheduled monument.	
Muness Castle		1598			Unst; HP 6295 0116	Scheduled monument.	
Scalloway Castle		1600			Scalloway; HU 4043 3923	Scheduled monument.	
Vaila Tower or Mucklaberry Tower		19th century			Vaila; HU 2212 4679	This small, two-storey tower is said to have been a watch tower, built in the early 19th century by the laird of Vaila House to oversee smuggling operations. The tower was rebuilt around 1900 as a gothic folly. Category B listed building.	

== See also ==
- Castles in Scotland
- List of castles in Scotland
- List of listed buildings in Shetland
