= List of castles in Scotland =

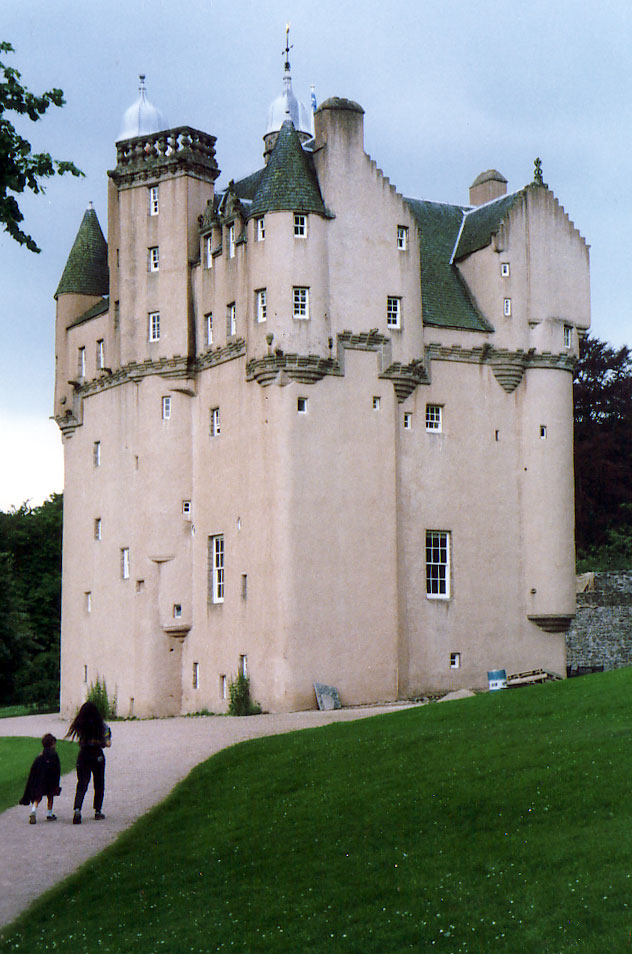
Craigievar Castle, Aberdeenshire

This is a list of castles in Scotland. A castle is a type of fortified structure built primarily during the Middle Ages. Scholars debate the scope of the word "castle", but usually consider it to be the private fortified residence of a lord or noble. This is distinct from a fortress, which was not a home, although this distinction is not absolute and the same structure may have had different uses from time to time. The term has been popularly applied to structures as diverse as hill forts and country houses. Over the approximately 500 years that castles were built, they took on a great many forms.

In Scotland, earlier fortifications had included hill forts, brochs, and duns; and many castles were on the site of these earlier buildings. The first castles were built in Scotland in the 11th and 12th centuries, with the introduction of Anglo-Norman influence. These motte and bailey castles were replaced with the first stone-built castles from around 1200.

By the late 14th century, the large curtain-walled castles had begun to give way to more modest tower houses – vertical dwellings with less formidable defences. This type of vertical house continued to be popular with Scotland's landowning class through to the late 17th century, when classical architecture made its first appearance in the country. Meanwhile, the advance of artillery pressed military engineers to devise stronger fortifications for important royal strongholds.

Tower houses and castles were often given painted ceilings and decorative plasterwork in the 16th and 17th centuries, employing distinctive national styles. In the late 18th century, forms found in medieval Scottish architecture were revived and castle-style houses were constructed. These "castles" had no defensive capability, but drew on military and tower house architecture for their decorative details. This architectural trend culminated in the Scottish Baronial style of the 19th century.

There have been well over two thousand castles in Scotland, although many are known only through historical records. They are found in all parts of the country although tower houses and peel towers are concentrated along the border with England, while the best examples of larger Renaissance-era tower houses are clustered in the north-east. There is some discussion about whether Scottish castles can be considered to be "true" castles, although this discussion is mainly focused around opinions held by some scholars as per the exact scope of the word castle.

== Lists by council area ==
See the individual council area lists for details of castles in each area:

- List of castles in Aberdeen
- List of castles in Aberdeenshire
- List of castles in Angus
- List of castles in Argyll and Bute
- List of castles in Clackmannanshire
- List of castles in Dumfries and Galloway
- List of castles in Dundee
- List of castles in East Ayrshire
- List of castles in East Dunbartonshire
- List of castles in East Lothian
- List of castles in East Renfrewshire
- List of castles in Edinburgh
- List of castles in Falkirk (council area)
- List of castles in Fife
- List of castles in Glasgow
- List of castles in Highland
- List of castles in Inverclyde
- List of castles in Midlothian
- List of castles in Moray
- List of castles in North Ayrshire
- List of castles in North Lanarkshire
- List of castles in Orkney
- List of castles in the Outer Hebrides
- List of castles in Perth and Kinross
- List of castles in Renfrewshire
- List of castles in the Scottish Borders
- List of castles in Shetland
- List of castles in South Ayrshire
- List of castles in South Lanarkshire
- List of castles in Stirling (council area)
- List of castles in West Dunbartonshire
- List of castles in West Lothian

== Fictional castles ==
- McDuck Castle, home of Disney cartoon character Scrooge McDuck.
- The Black Island, a comic of The Adventures of Tintin featuring a castle based on Lochranza Castle.
- The Ghosts of Inverloch, a Valérian comic, also features a Scottish castle.
- Castle Dangerous, a novel by Sir Walter Scott, drew inspiration from Douglas Castle.
- Old Mortality, a novel by Sir Walter Scott, drew inspiration from Craignethan Castle as Tillietudlem Castle.
- Hogwarts Castle, School of Witchcraft and Wizardry in the Harry Potter novels.

== See also ==
- Castles in the United Kingdom
- List of castles
- List of castles in England
- List of castles in Wales
- List of castles in Northern Ireland
- List of castles in the Isle of Man
- Historic houses in Scotland
- List of town walls in Scotland
- Restoration of castles in Scotland
