= List of castles in the Isle of Man =

This is a list of castles in the Isle of Man.

== Castles ==
Name	Type	Date	Location	Condition	Image	Ownership	Notes
Bishopscourt	Fortified manor house	14th–19th centuries	2 km NE of Kirk Michael on A3 road	Rebuilt		Haakon the III	Remains of 14th-century tower incorporated in later house. Former residence of the Bishop of Sodor and Man.
Castle Rushen	Keep and bailey	13th–14th centuries	Castletown	Intact			Former residence of the Lords of Man. Converted for use as a prison in the 19th century. Now run as a museum by Manx National Heritage.
Cronk Howe Mooar	Motte and bailey	11th–12th centuries	Ballafesson, Rushen (near Port Erin)	Earthworks			Possible site of timber fortification built by Magnus Barefoot c.1100.
Derby Fort	Artillery fort	16th–17th centuries	Near Derbyhaven, Malew	Intact			Henrician Castle originally built c. 1540, reconditioned during the English Civil War.
Greeba Castle	Castellated house	c.1849	On A1 road 2 km NW of Crosby, Marown	Intact			Home of novelist Hall Caine 1896–1931
Peel Castle	Castle	14th–15th centuries	Peel	Ruins		Manx National Heritage	Possible site of timber castle built by Magnus Barefoot c.1100; fortifications added until 19th century. Site of ruined cathedral of St German.

== See also ==
- List of castles in England
- List of castles in Ireland
- Castles in Scotland
- List of castles in Wales

International:

- List of castles
