= Ardvourlie Castle =

Castle in the Outer Hebrides, Scotland

Coordinates: 57.99488°N 6.75822°W

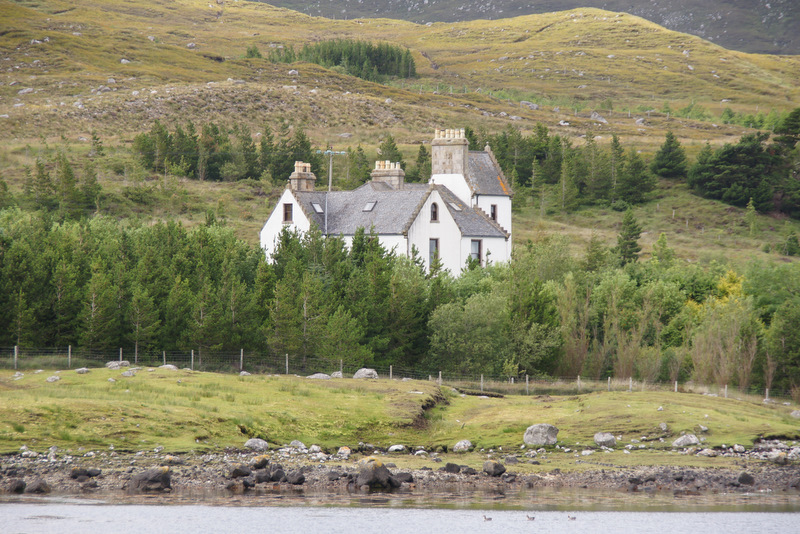

- Location within Harris

History
- Built: 19th century

Listed Building – Category B
- Official name: ARDVOURLIE CASTLE INCLUDING GARDEN TERRACE WALLS, SLIPWAY AND BRIDGE
- Designated: 18 April 2004
- Reference no.: LB49675

Ardvourlie Castle is a 19th-century country house on Harris, one of the Western Isles off the north-west coast of Scotland. The house was built beside Loch Seaforth in 1863 as a hunting lodge on the North Harris Estate, for Charles Murray, 7th Earl of Dunmore, the then owner of the island. It is a category B listed building.

It was put up for sale in 2009.
