= Boghouse Castle =

Castle in South Lanarkshire, Scotland

Coordinates: 55.492862°N 3.777028°W

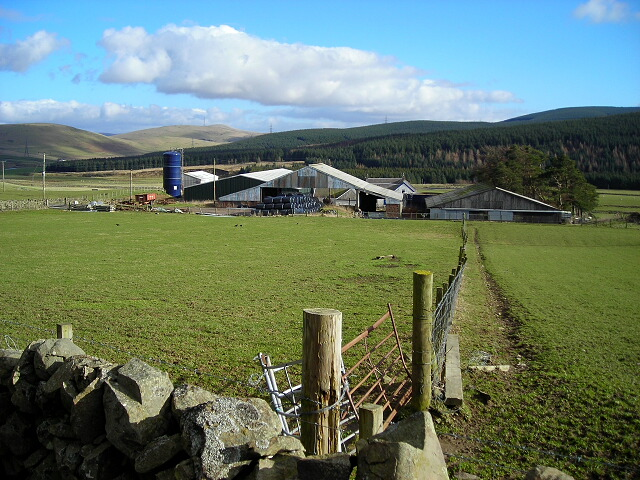
Farm of Boghouse, site of Boghouse Castle in 2007.

Boghouse Castle, was a 14th-century castle, constructed near Crawfordjohn, South Lanarkshire, Scotland. The castle was known to be ruinous by the early 19th century and is now the site of a farm, with no remains visible.
