= Eddlewood Castle =

Castle in Scotland

- South Lanarkshire, Scotland

Site information
- Condition: Ruins

Eddlewood Castle was a castle located near Hamilton, South Lanarkshire, Scotland.

== History ==
The castle was situated on the Meikle Burn and was demolished in 1568, after the Battle of Langside.

The ruins of the castle lay in Chatelherault Country Park.

== Bibliography ==
- Coventry, Martin (2008). Castles of the Clans: the strongholds and seats of 750 Scottish families and clans. Musselburgh.
