= Roberton Castle =

Castle in South Lanarkshire, Scotland

Coordinates: 55.525686°N 3.680572°W

Roberton Castle, was a 12th-century motte and bailey castle, constructed by Robert, brother of Lambin Asa, near Roberton, South Lanarkshire, Scotland.

The castle appears to have been abandoned in the 14th century. The castle was the caput baroniae of the feudal barony of Roberton and seat of the Robertons of that ilk until their dispossession by King Robert I of Scotland for siding with the English during the First War of Scottish Independence.

It appears to have been replaced by a fortified manor house at Castle Dykes.
