= Mar's Castle =

Building in Aberdeen, Scotland

Coordinates: 57.1517°N 2.0990°W

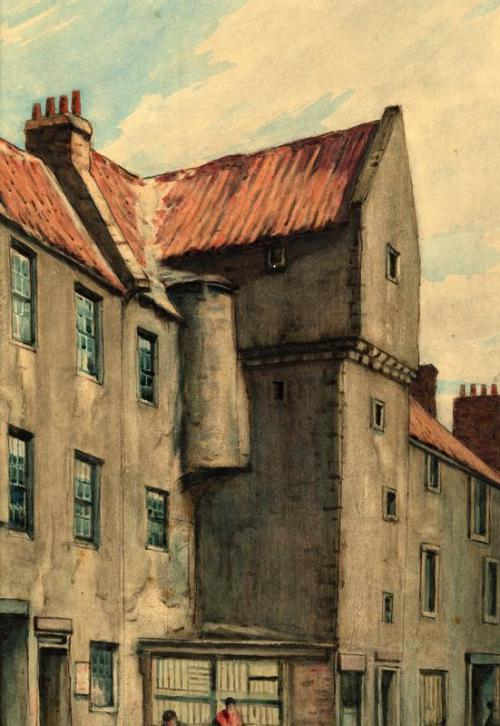
A Victorian watercolour of the castle

Mar's Castle was a historic house in Aberdeen, Scotland, situated on the Gallowgate. It was similar in age and appearance to Provost Ross's House on the Shiprow. It is said to have been the townhouse of the Earls of Mar, and to have been built in 1594.

The castle was subdivided into shops and houses in the mid-19th century. By the end of the century, it had been deemed "no longer fit for human habitation" due to its "ruinous condition". It also created a bottleneck for traffic by projecting into the Gallowgate, and this induced the council to purchase and demolish the building in 1897. The loss was lamented by some Aberdonians, since the castle had been "the only picturesque structure in the whole length of that dismal and dreary thoroughfare".
