= Rumgally House =

16th-century tower house in Fife, Scotland

Coordinates: 56.3226°N 2.959°W

Rumgally House is the site of a 16th-century tower house, about 2.5 miles (4.0 km) east of Cupar, Fife, Scotland, and south of the River Eden. The castle became part of a mansion.

== History ==
James Butellare owned the property in 1446; it is mentioned in the document that associated lands belonging to Sir William Scott of Balweary into the barony of Strathmiglo. The estate came into the possession of a cadet of the Wemyss. A charter of Charles I, dated at Greenwich 18 June 1635, mentions "Rungallie with lease of manor, mill". In 1658 the Rev. James M'Gill, minister of Largo, Fife acquired it.

The house is said to have been the resting place of several kings of Scotland, when travelling between St Andrews and Falkland Palace.

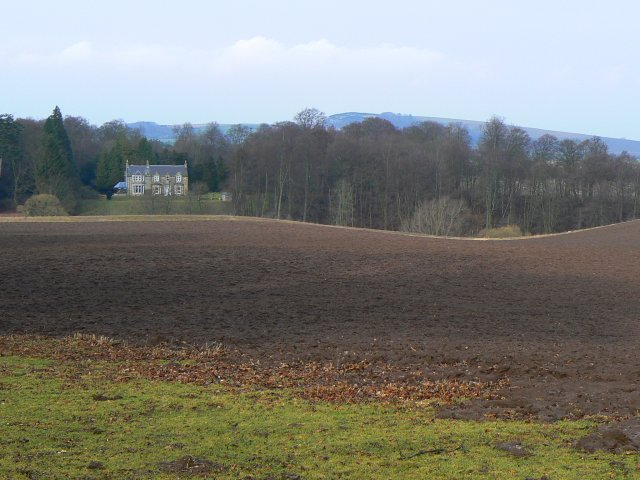

== Structure ==
The old part of Rumgally House is to the south; there have been additions to the east and north at different periods. The old portion is L-plan, with a round tower in the re-entrant angle. The south west angle of the west wing has a small corbelled turret. But the property has been restore completely, with the walls harled.

- Castles in Great Britain and Ireland
- List of castles in Scotland
