= Duneaton Water =

River in South Lanarkshire, Scotland

Coordinates: 55°31′N 3°41′W

Duneaton Water is a river in South Lanarkshire, Scotland. It joins the River Clyde at Abington.
