= Whiteadder Reservoir =

Reservoir in the United Kingdom

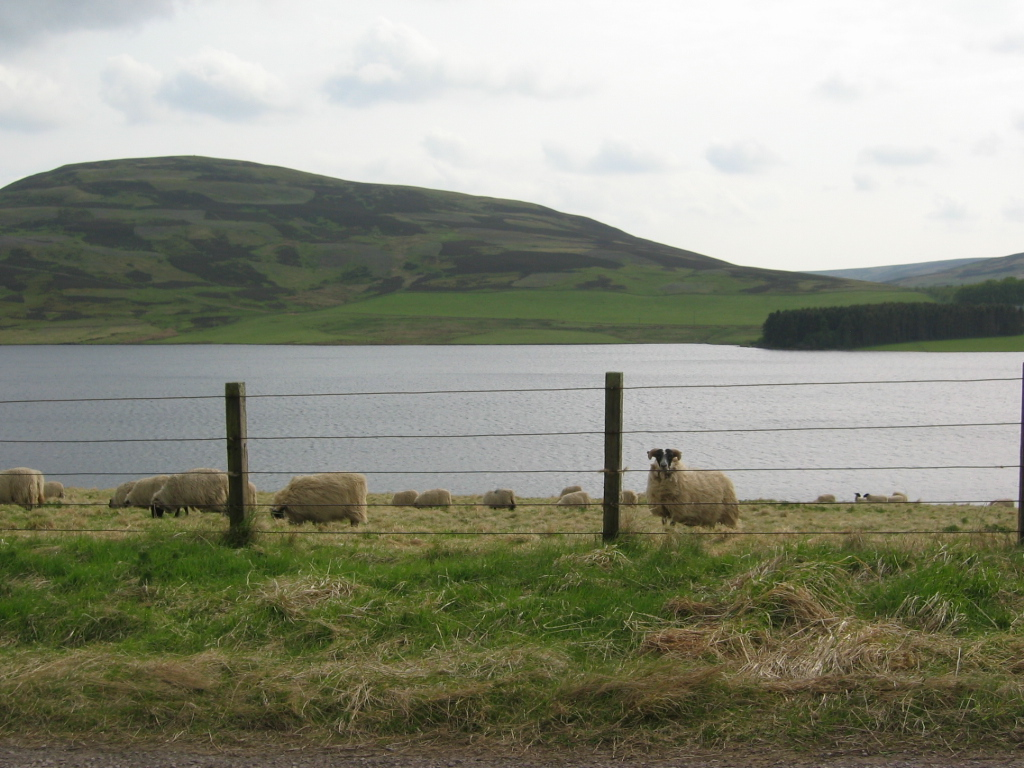
- Sheep at the reservoir

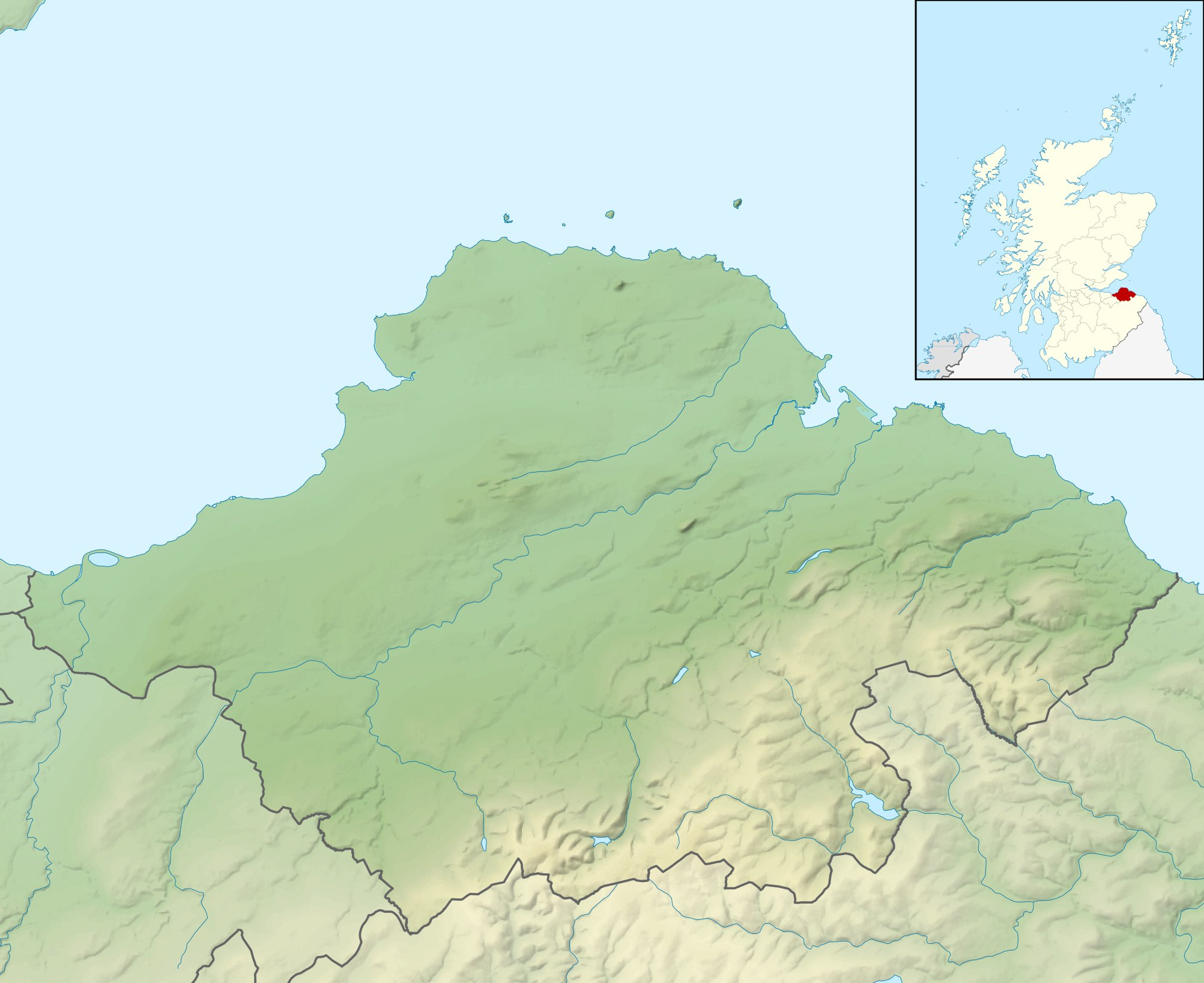
- Location within East Lothian
- Location: East Lothian, Scotland
- Coordinates: 55°51′50″N 2°33′23″W
- Type: reservoir
- Basin countries: United Kingdom
- Surface area: 193 acres (0.78 km^{2})

Whiteadder Reservoir is a reservoir in East Lothian, Scotland, UK, in the Lammermuir Hills, 11 miles (18 km) north west of Duns in the Scottish Borders, and five miles (8 km) south east of Garvald. It was created to provide additional water facilities for East Lothian.

Work on the Dam forming the reservoir commenced in 1964. Design was carried out by consulting civil engineers GH Hill & Sons of Manchester and London, on behalf of the then local water authority - East Lothian Water Board. The flooding ceremony was in May 1968. Millknowe Farm and Kingside School were flooded.

Whiteadder reservoir supplies East Lothian and Berwickshire, including the former Cockenzie Power Station on the northern coast of East Lothian, the Whiteadder Water flows out of the reservoir and is the lowest tributary of the River Tweed which it enters at Berwick-on-Tweed. In 2023, a 200kW hydro-electric plant was commissioned, providing power to the "Hungry Snout" water pumping station.

== Data ==
- Dam: 89 feet (27 m) high, and 600 feet (180 m) thick at the base.
- Capacity: 1,750 million US gallons (6,600,000 m^{3})
- Surface: 193 acres (0.78 km^{2})
- Hydo-electric output: ~0.82GWh/year from a 200kW turbine.

== Hydroelectricity ==
In 2023, an innovative siphon-fed hydroelectricity plant was opened. The siphon takes water from the intake over the top of the reservoir to a 200kW turbine. Using a siphon minimised civil engineering works. The system was designed to generate 0.82GWh per year, providing as much as 30% of the electricity required by the "Hungry Snout" pumping station, which feeds the Castle Moffat Water Treatment Works.

== Amenities ==
Although the reservoir and the Outdoor Education Centre are in East Lothian, it has been managed by the Outdoor Education department of Scottish Borders Council for over 20 years. Through a partnership between East Lothian Council, Scottish Borders Council and Borders Sailing Club, funds were obtained for a major refurbishment, and the new Centre was opened in 2005.

The centre was mothballed in 2017 due to funding cuts but reopened in August 2021 under the auspices of Whiteadder Watersports Trust - a charity set up by sailing instructors who previously worked at the centre.

The charity's objective is to retain the strong natural feel of the location while making the most of it for teaching people how to enjoy a range of water-based activities safely and expertly.

== Antiquities ==
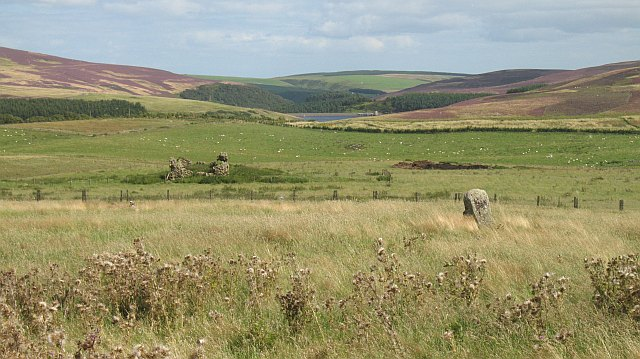
The Chapel Stone, with the ruins of Penshiel Grange behind, and the reservoir in the distance

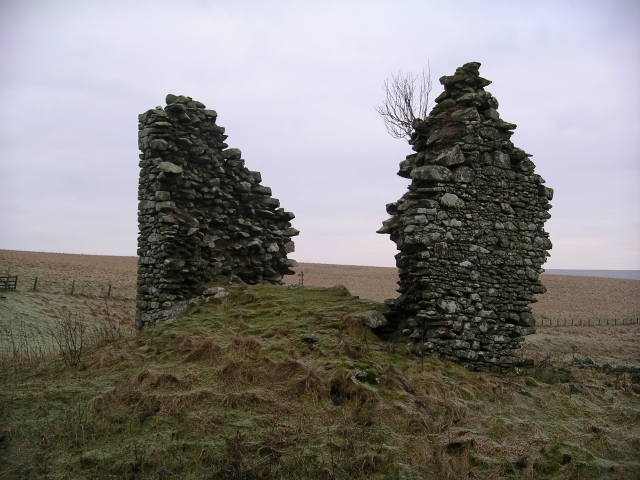
The ruins of Gamelshiel Castle

Prehistoric settlement in the area is represented by the Friar's Nose, a multivallate promontory fort immediately east of the reservoir. Directly across the Whiteadder valley from the fort, to the north-east of the reservoir, traces of a prehistoric settlement and field system have been recorded.

Penshiel Grange is a ruin located to the southeast of the reservoir. It was a monastic grange attached to Melrose Abbey and was probably built in the first half of the 15th century, though there is reference to Penshiel in a charter of 1200. Penshiel Grange is protected as a scheduled monument. The main building measures about 82 by 25 feet (25.0 by 7.6 m), and has a wall about 10 feet (3.0 m) high. There are some traces of a tower at the south-east corner, and some evidence of a courtyard to the north and south of the ruin, with the wall on the south of the main building, now being merely a turf-covered stony bank. There were at least two building to the north, one of which may have been a chapel.

The ruins of Gamelshiel Castle are located around 0.6 kilometres (0.37 mi) north-east of the northern end of the reservoir, on the south side of the Hall Burn. The lands of Gamelshiel were held by the Forrest family in the 16th century, and by the Homes in the 17th century. The fragmentary ruin comprises the east and west walls of a small tower house, built in the 16th century. The tower was constructed from whinstone and was around 7 metres (23 ft) across. The remaining walls are 1.3 metres (4 ft 3 in) thick and stand to a height of 6 metres (20 ft). The height and appearance of the tower are uncertain, though there is evidence of a vaulted cellar.

To the west of the reservoir is the "Packman's Grave", a setting of stones said to mark the burial-place of a murdered packman.

== Photo gallery ==
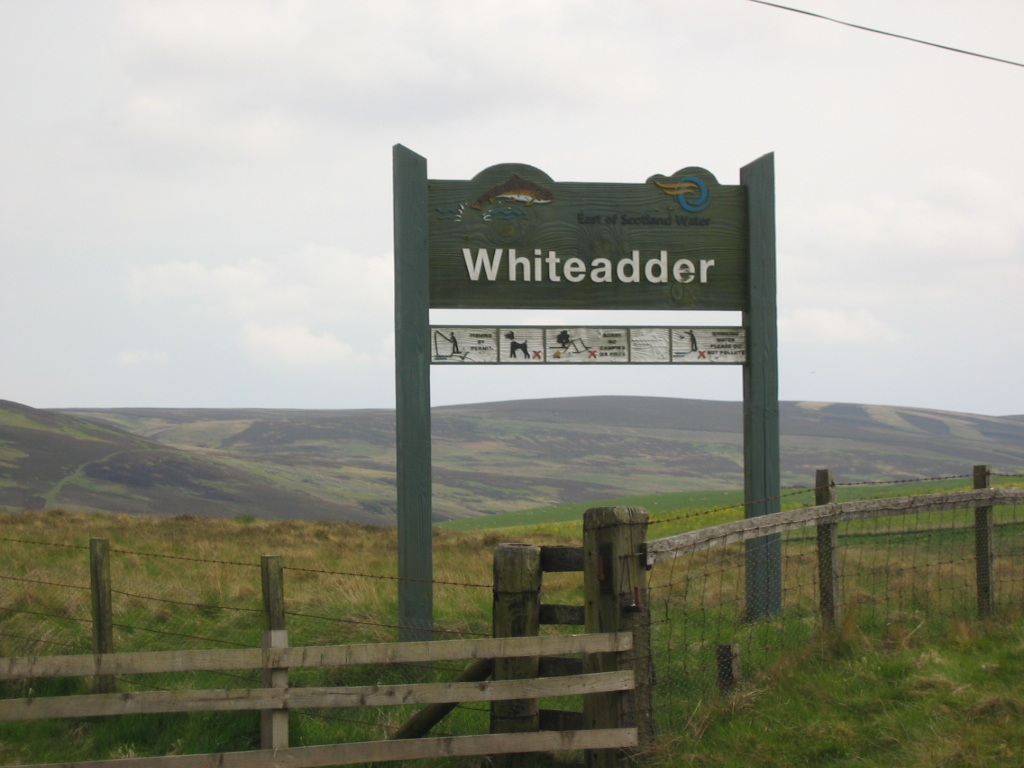
Whiteadder

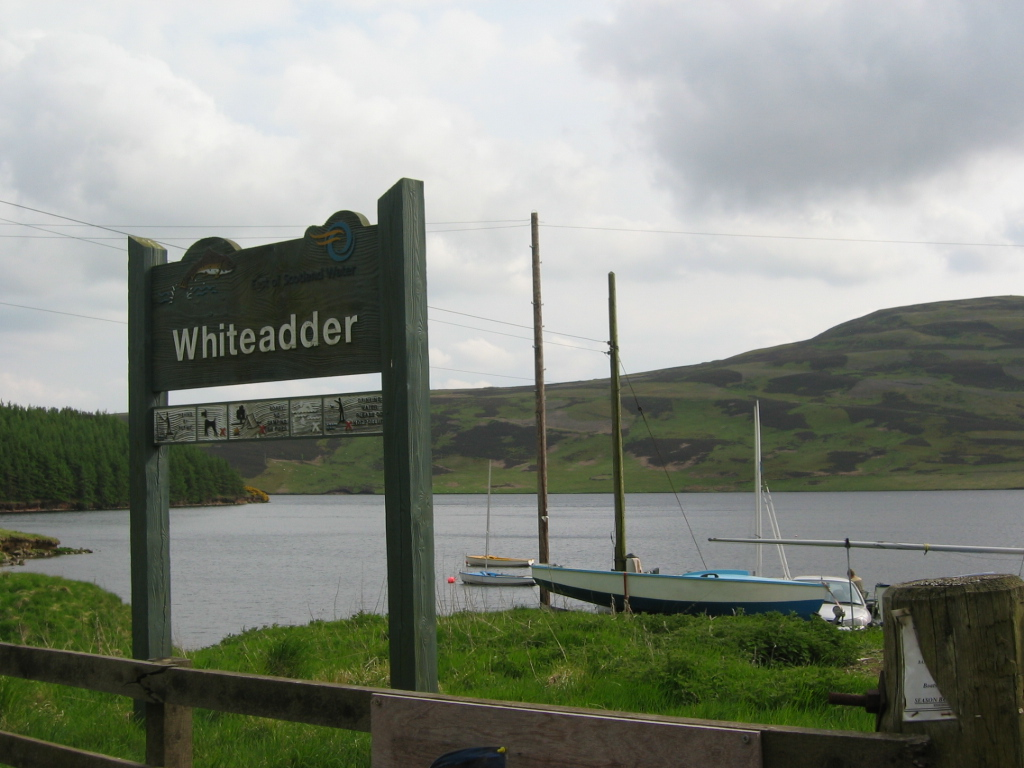
Sailing at Whiteadder

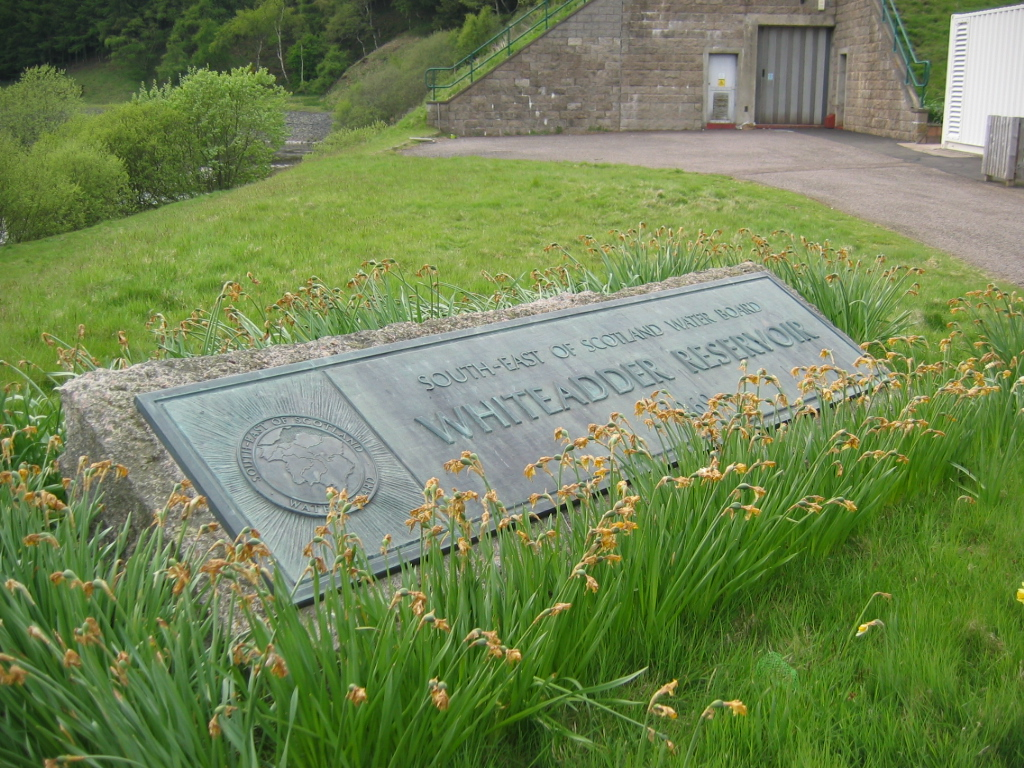
Reservoir Memorial plaque

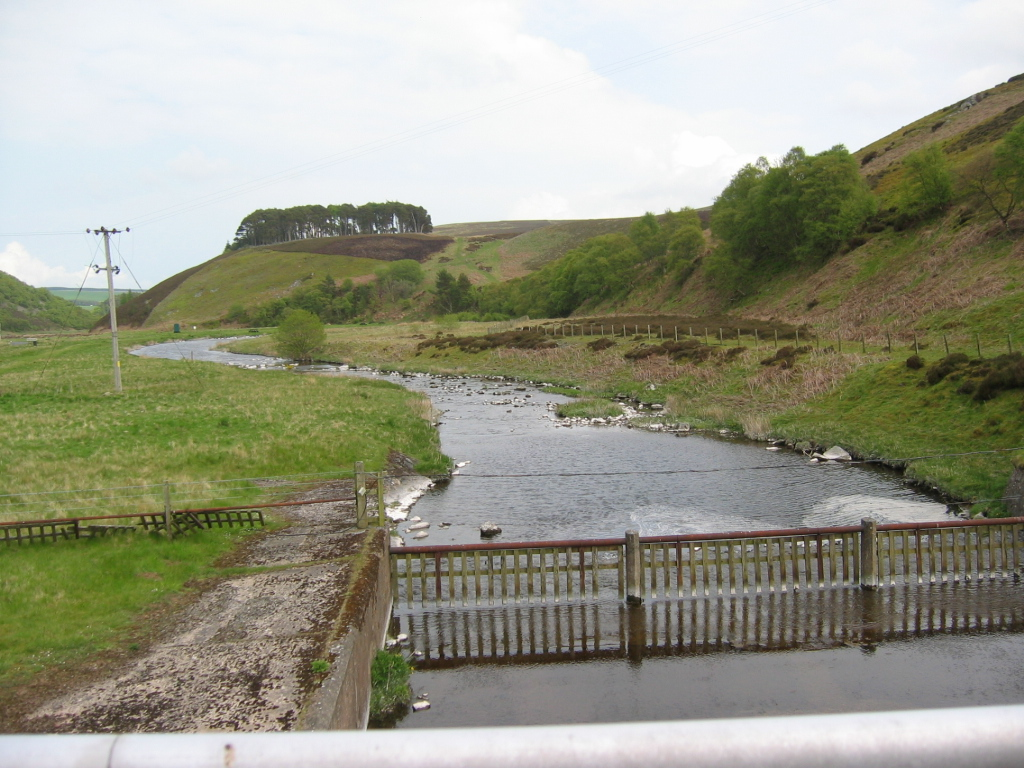
Whiteadder Water from the Reservoir

== See also ==
- List of reservoirs and dams in the United Kingdom
- List of places in East Lothian
