= Z-plan castle =

Form of castle design common in Scotland and England

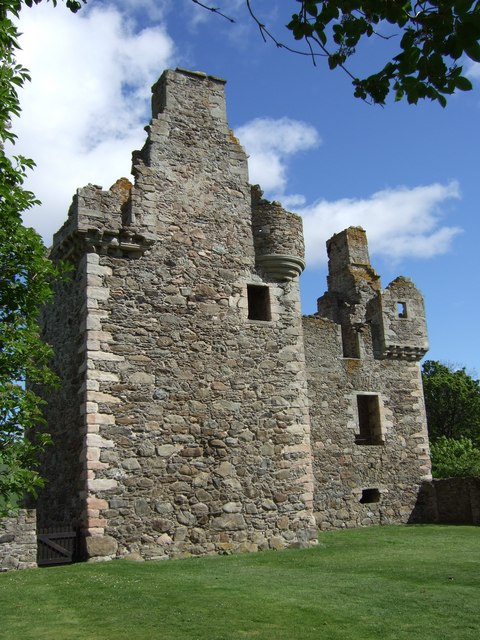
Glenbuchat Castle

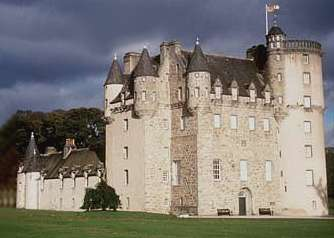
Castle Fraser

Z-plan is a form of castle design common in Scotland and England. The Z-plan castle has a strong central rectangular tower with smaller towers attached at diagonally opposite corners.

Prominent examples of the Z-plan include Brodie Castle in Moray, Castle Menzies in Perthshire, Glenbuchat Castle in Aberdeenshire, Castle Fraser in Aberdeenshire, Claypotts Castle in Dundee and Hatton Castle, Angus, Scotland.

== See also ==
- L-plan castle
