= Claypotts Castle =

Coordinates: 56°28′35″N 2°53′24″W

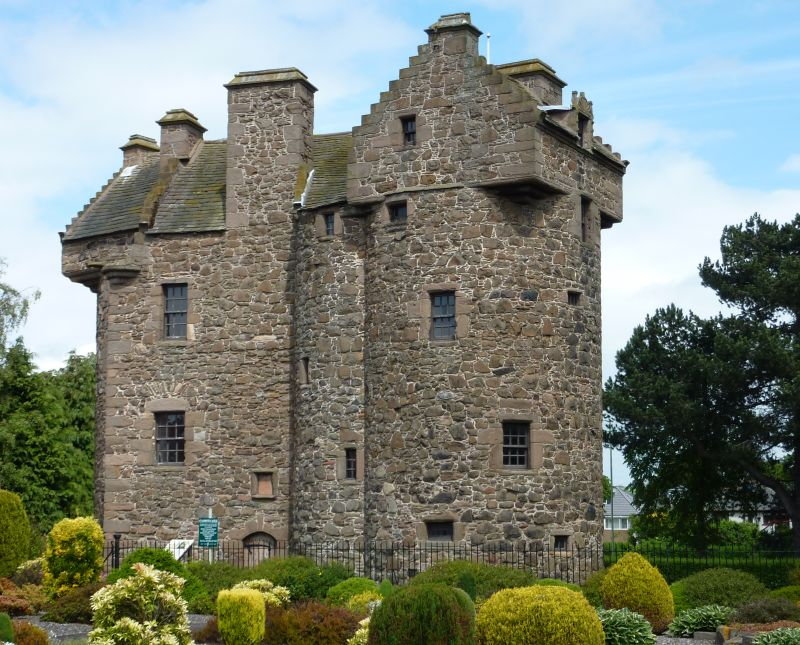
- A view of Claypotts Castle
- Interactive map of the Claypotts Castle area

General information
- Location: West Ferry, Dundee, Scotland

Technical details
- Material: Stone

Scheduled monument
- Official name: Claypotts Castle
- Designated: 30 November 1981
- Reference no.: SM90075

Claypotts Castle is a late medieval castle in the suburban West Ferry area of Dundee, Scotland. It is one of the best-preserved examples of a 16th-century Z-plan tower house in Scotland. Now surrounded by modern housing, the castle is maintained as an Ancient Monument by Historic Environment Scotland.

== History ==
The castle was originally built by John Strachan around 1569–1588 according to dates inscribed on stones that make up parts of the castle, which make its construction longer than usual for such a small building. The land on which the castle was built was originally leased by the Strachan family from the Tironensian Abbey of Lindores starting in the early 16th century.

In 1601 the Strachan family sold the castle to Sir William Graham of Ballunie who later sold it to Sir William Graham of Claverhouse. The castle became the property of the crown in 1689 after the death of the then current owner Viscount Dundee John Graham of Claverhouse at the battle of Killiecrankie. In 1694 the castle was given to James Douglas, 2nd Marquess of Douglas. The castle later became the property of his son the Duke of Douglas and after his death in 1761 became the subject of a legal battle for the next eight years until the courts ruled Archibald Douglas to be heir. Ownership later passed to the 13th Earl of Home through marriage who later gave the castle to the state in 1926. It is now in the care of Historic Environment Scotland.

There is a legend that the castle was once home to an industrious brownie who helped the servants with their work, but that he left in disgust because of a lazy kitchen maid.

== Architecture ==
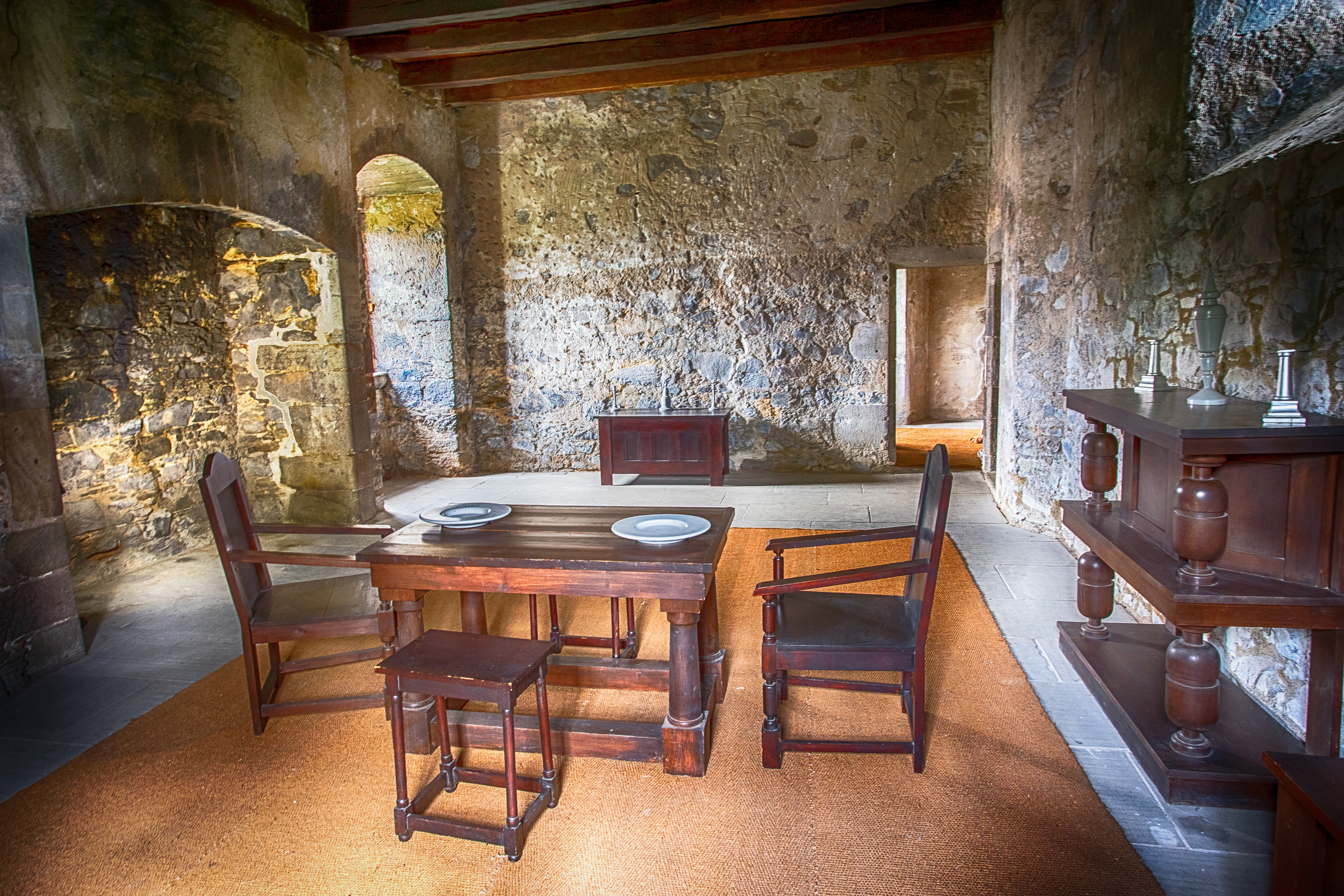
Interior of Claypotts Castle

The castle consists of projecting towers at opposite sides of a rectangular main block, known as a Z-plan tower house. This was a popular design in the 16th century and allowed defenders to fire along the faces of the main block from both towers, although it is unlikely that the castle would have had much of a defensive role given its domestic scale.
