= Crawfordjohn =

Coordinates: 55°29′43″N 3°46′31″W

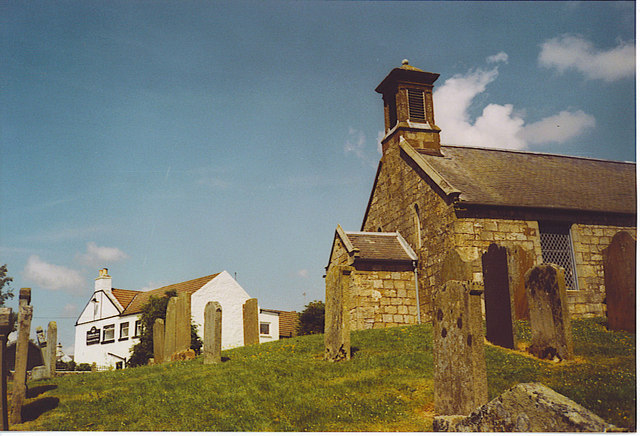
- Crawfordjohn

- Location within South Lanarkshire
- Population: 117
- OS grid reference: NS880238
- Council area: South Lanarkshire
- Lieutenancy area: Lanarkshire
- Country: Scotland
- Sovereign state: United Kingdom
- Post town: BIGGAR
- Postcode district: ML12
- Police: Scotland
- Fire: Scottish
- Ambulance: Scottish
- UK Parliament: Dumfriesshire, Clydesdale and Tweeddale
- Scottish Parliament: Clydesdale

Crawfordjohn is a small village and civil parish of 117 residents located in South Lanarkshire, Scotland. It is three miles (5 km) west of Abington and seven miles (11 km) north east of Leadhills, near junction 13 of the M74. It lies to the north of the Duneaton Water, a tributary of the River Clyde. It is known for the manufacture of curling stones.
