= John Elphinstone (courtier) =

John Elphinstone of Selmes and Baberton (1553-1614) was a Scottish landowner and courtier.

== Career ==
He was a son of Robert Elphinstone, 3rd Lord Elphinstone and Margaret Drummond, a daughter of John Drummond of Innerpeffray and Margaret Stewart, a daughter of King James IV.

His father granted him the lands of Selmes (Selms), near Kirknewton, West Lothian, when he was an infant.

He was a servant of the Duke of Lennox in 1590.

He was in London in November 1592 with his father, or his brother the Master of Elphinstone, probably as a servant of Duke of Lennox. He wrote to Archibald Douglas from Edinburgh with court news in December. He was going to Alloa Tower with James VI and Anne of Denmark to the "infare" wedding celebrations of the Earl of Mar and Marie Stewart, a sister of the Duke of Lennox. There would be a masque in which the queen performed in costume, and the plan was to travel to Tullibardine afterwards.

James VI had invested 54,000 dalers from Anna of Denmark's dowry in various Scottish towns, and in July 1594 Elphinstone was authorised to collect £4,000 Scots from St Andrews and Anstruther for the clothing of her household, "the apparrelling of hir laydis, madynnis of honnour, gentilwemen, and serving wemen." This was for the baptism of Prince Henry celebrated at Stirling Castle.

Elphinstone was described by James VI as a "servitor to our dearest bedfellow the queen", a servant of Anna of Denmark, in March 1595, and received £1000 Scots as payment for his service to date in September 1599. James VI gave him the lands of Kilbaberton or Baberton in August 1597. He seems to have been a gentleman of the queen's privy chamber from 1591 to 1603. He is also described as one of the queen's ushers. He was knighted in 1604 and made a denizen of England in May 1605.

Elphinstone had reputation at court for dancing.

== Arbella Stuart ==
Arbella Stewart regarded him as a "very good friend". Her letters, as early as August 1603, mention that he knew Mary Talbot, Countess of Shrewsbury. Elphinstone may have recently met the Countess at Worksop Manor in June when Anne of Denmark travelled from Scotland to London.

Elphinstone wrote to Arbella Stewart in March 1608 from Whitehall Palace. He had received Arbella's letters from Hardwick Hall and Sheffield. He reassured her about the business of her lutenist Thomas Cutting being sent to Denmark to serve Christian IV. He sent her barrels of salmon, herrings, and the pickled dill preferred by Grace Cavendish, Lady Chatsworth, the wife of Sir Henry Cavendish. He mentioned that Anne of Denmark was moving to Theobalds to join King James in the following week.

He may be the same person as the "John Elveston" in the household of Anna of Denmark in London in 1608. According to the Earl of Arundel and his wife Alethea, John Elveston revealed the marriage of Christian Bruce and William Cavendish, 2nd Earl of Devonshire to the queen on their wedding day, and had a hand with Arbella Stewart in arranging the marriage.

On 7 May 1613 Gervase Helwys, the newly appointed Lieutenant of the Tower of London was instructed to allow Elphinstone to visit Arbella Stuart and speak to her in private. The previous Lieutenant, William Wade had been dismissed after his daughter helped Arbella Stuart make a wax impression to obtain a duplicate key.

== Petitioning for payment ==
His lands of Baberton were transferred to the royal master of work James Murray around the year 1606. In a legal document drawn up in April 1608, Elphinstone mentioned his need to provide for his children, especially the three youngest, John, George, and Margaret.

Anne of Denmark gave Elphinstone the patronage of St Saviour's Southwark in 1606. The former holder Sir Thomas Sherley protested, saying that King James could have given Elphinstone an equivalent income.

In February 1608 Anne of Denmark forwarded a petition to the king for Elphinstone to be granted a lucrative patent. The angered King James who read it and tore it up. According to Roger Aston the king objected to its drafting. In May 1609, following the conviction of his brother Lord Balmerino for treason, Elphinstone petitioned Anne of Denmark for payment, having received no fees for 15 years. He had sold his horses, some of his lands in Scotland, and pawned jewels she and Christian IV had given him. His creditors had imprisoned his servant, because as a royal domestic servant he had immunity. Elphinstone applied for a patent to license chapmen and beggars. He received £500. He and his nephew Michael Elphinstone were given yearly pensions of £200 in 1609.

He died in October 1614. Lucy Russell, Countess of Bedford wrote to her friend Jane Cornwallis that he died "on Tuesday last, to the great grief of all good dancers".

Elphinstone made a will for his property in England. According to this will, Elphinstone had borrowed £1,000 from Anne of Denmark which he hoped she would not claim from his nephew John Elphinstone, 2nd Lord Balmerino. He left a gold chain with a miniature portrait of Christian IV with a diamond ring, which the Danish king had given him, to be added to the posterity of the house of Elphinstone. He left a diamond ring that Anne of Denmark had given him to the House of Balmerino.

In Scotland Elphinstone was regarded as intestate, and his executors made a list of property incomes due to him for lands in the parish of Leuchars.

== Marriage and family ==
John Elphinstone married Gilles Elphinstone daughter of William Elphinstone of Selmes. Their children included:

- James Elphinstone of Selmes (1592-1613), who married Bethia Guthrie.
- John Elphinstone of Selmes (d. 1630)
- George Elphinstone of Selmes (d. 1651)
- Margaret Elphinstone
- Jean Elphinstone
