= Coupar Angus (barony) =

Lordship and Barony of Coupar
- Creation date: 1606/1607
- Created by: James VI
- Peerage: Baronage of Scotland
- First holder: James Elphinstone, 1st Lord Coupar
- Last holder: Extant
- Present holder: Edward K. Rutledge
- Subsidiary titles: Lord Balmerino
- Status: Feudal lordship extant, peerage title forfeit 1746
- Seat: Sandhill House, Mountain Lake FL
- Former seat: Coupar Angus Abbey
- Arms: Arms of Edward Rutledge, Lord and Baron of Coupar

Coupar, also known as Coupar Angus, is a Scottish feudal Regality and Barony in Perthshire. It was created in 1606/7 by King James VI of Scotland, who erected the former Coupar Angus Abbey lands into a temporal lordship and barony for James Elphinstone, second son of the 1st Lord Balmerino. Elphinstone was granted the title Lord Coupar, making him a Lord of Parliament, and he took the Abbey of Coupar Angus (a wealthy Cistercian abbey founded in the 12th century by King Malcolm IV) as one of his family seats.

== History ==
The lordship remained in the Elphinstone family (who also held the title Lord Balmerino) through the 17th century, with Lord Coupar actively participating in the Scottish Parliament and siding with the Covenanters during the Wars of the Three Kingdoms. In 1645, as a consequence of Lord Coupar's Covenanter allegiance, Royalist troops under the Marquis of Montrose plundered and devastated the Coupar estates.

After the death of James Elphinstone, 1st Lord Coupar, in 1669 the Coupar lordship passed via his daughter Marion Ogilvy (Lady Coupar) into the Ogilvy family. Marion's father, James Ogilvy, 2nd Earl of Airlie, purchased the lands and barony of Coupar in 1669 from her, making the Ogilvys temporary holders of Coupar. However, the barony soon returned to the Elphinstone/Balmerino family: the Coupar peerage title had been created with a special remainder, allowing it to be inherited by the Balmerino line. Thus, John Elphinstone, 3rd Lord Balmerino, became the 2nd Lord Coupar, and subsequent Lords Balmerino continued to bear the title Lord Coupar as a subsidiary honour. The last of this line was Arthur Elphinstone, 6th Lord Balmerino and 5th Lord Coupar, a Jacobite who was captured after the Battle of Culloden. In 1746 he was convicted of treason and beheaded, with his titles attainted and forfeited. The Lordship of Parliament (as a peerage title in the Peerage of Scotland) became forfeit in 1746 as a result of Arthur's attainder, and Coupar estates were confiscated by the Crown. In 1754, James Stuart, 8th Earl of Moray purchased the lordship and barony of Coupar, which remained in the possession of the Earls of Moray into the early 20th century. Although the Lord of Parliament peerage title was never restored, the feudal lordship and barony of Coupar (Coupar Angus) persisted as a hereditament attached to the land. Under Scotland's modern legal reforms (notably the Abolition of Feudal Tenure etc. (Scotland) Act 2000), the barony became a preserved but transferable dignity, separate from the land.

== Modern status ==
After nearly a century of dormancy, the Lordship and Barony were assigned in 2024 to the Rutledge family. The current Lord Baron of Coupar, Edward K. Rutledge, OStJ, FSAScot, descends from both the Elphinstones and the Ogilvys of Airlie.
