= Clan Elphinstone =

Lowland Scottish clan

- Crest: A lady, from the waist upwards, richly habited in gules, her arms extended, the right hand supporting a tower and the left holding a branch of laurel, all Proper.
- Motto: Cause Causit (Scots)

Profile
- Region: Lowlands
- District: East Lothian

Chief
- The Right Hon. Alexander Elphinstone
- 19th Lord Elphinstone
- Seat: Whitberry House, Tyninghame, East Lothian
- Historic seat: Elphinstone Tower, Stirlingshire
Clan branches
Elphinstone of Elphinstone (chiefs)
Elphinstone of Balmerino
Allied clans
Clan Swinton
Clan Seton

Clan Elphinstone is a Lowland Scottish clan.

== History ==
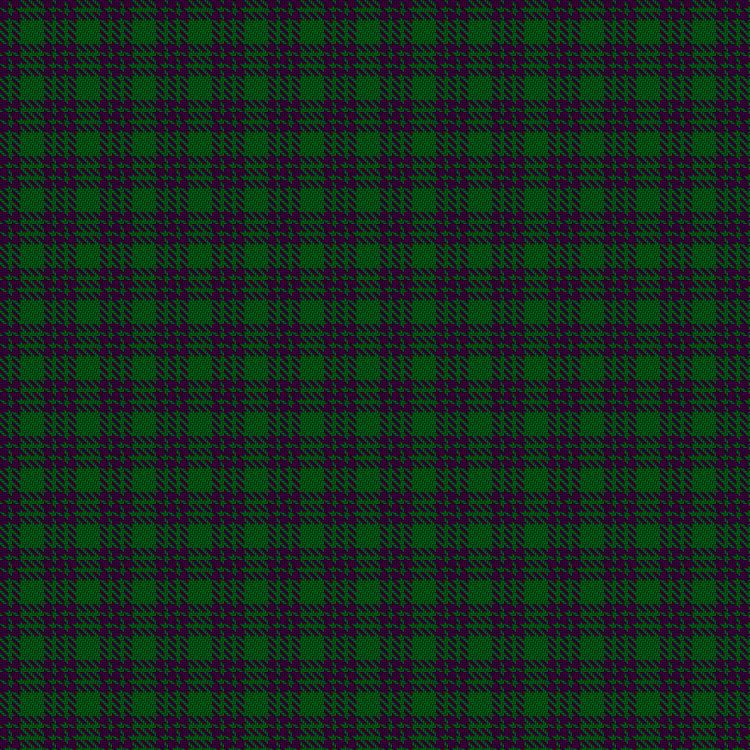
Elphinstone tartan

=== Origins of the clan ===
The 'de Erth' family took their name from the lands of Airth which lie close to the barony of Plean in Stirlingshire. This family probably erected the first Plean Castle. The de Erth family ended in an heiress, and lands that were acquired by her husband near Tranent near East Lothian were probably named after the heiress's family. The name first appears in about 1235 in East Lothian in a deed by Alanus de Swinton in which a mention is made of the name 'de Elfinstun'. It is likely that de Swinton's son, John, who owned the lands, went on to become John de Elfinstun.

There is a family tradition however, that claims that the family are descended from Flemish knights (or one knight) called Helphenstein. Another theory suggests that the name is derived from Old English Alpins tun ("the farmstead of Alpin").

=== 14th, 15th and 16th centuries ===
Sir John de Elfinstun married Margaret of Seton who was a niece of Robert the Bruce. One of John's descendants was William Elfinstun who became rector of Kirkmichael (St. Michael's Church) in Glasgow. William studied Civil and Canon Law in Paris and he eventually became Professor of Law at that university. He also became Bishop of Aberdeen in 1484 and later Lord High Chancellor of Scotland. William later obtained a bull from Pope Alexander VI in 1494 for founding the University of Aberdeen.

A cousin of bishop William was Sir Alexander Elphinstone who was created Lord Elphinstone by James IV of Scotland. Alexander and the king were together killed at the Battle of Flodden in 1513. Alexander's son, another Alexander Elphinstone, was killed at the Battle of Pinkie in 1547.

In 1599 the fourth Lord Elphinstone was appointed a judge of the Supreme Court of Scotland.

=== 18th century and Jacobite risings ===
A cadet branch of the Clan Elphinstone were the Lords Balmerino. They were staunch Jacobites and the sixth Lord Balmerino was captured after the Battle of Culloden and beheaded in August 1746.

The eleventh Lord Elphinstone was lieutenant governor of Edinburgh Castle.

=== 19th and 20th centuries ===
One of the eleventh Lord's younger brothers was George Keith Elphinstone who was a distinguished naval officer. He served on ships that protected the British shipping off the east coast of America. He was created Baron Keith which was promoted to the rank of Viscount in 1814. The Viscount's nephew was William George Elphinstone who was a colonel at the Battle of Waterloo in 1815. He was later promoted to commander-in-chief of the Bengal army in 1837 and led the disastrous Afghan campaign of 1841.

== Clan Chief ==
The present Chief of Clan Elphinstone is Alexander Lord Elphinstone who succeeded his father in 1994 at the age of 14.

== Clan Castles ==
- Elphinstone Tower, East Lothian
- Elphinstone Tower, Falkirk
- Plean Castle

== See also ==
- Scotland
