= Lundie (surname) =

Lundie is a surname. Notable people with the surname include:

- Bill Lundie (1888–1917), South African cricketer
- Frank Lundie (1866–1933), Australian trade unionist
- James Lundie (footballer) (1857–1942), Scottish footballer
- Robert Lundie (died 1500), Lord High Treasurer of Scotland
