= Alexander Elphinstone, 2nd Lord Elphinstone =

Scottish landowner (1511–1547)

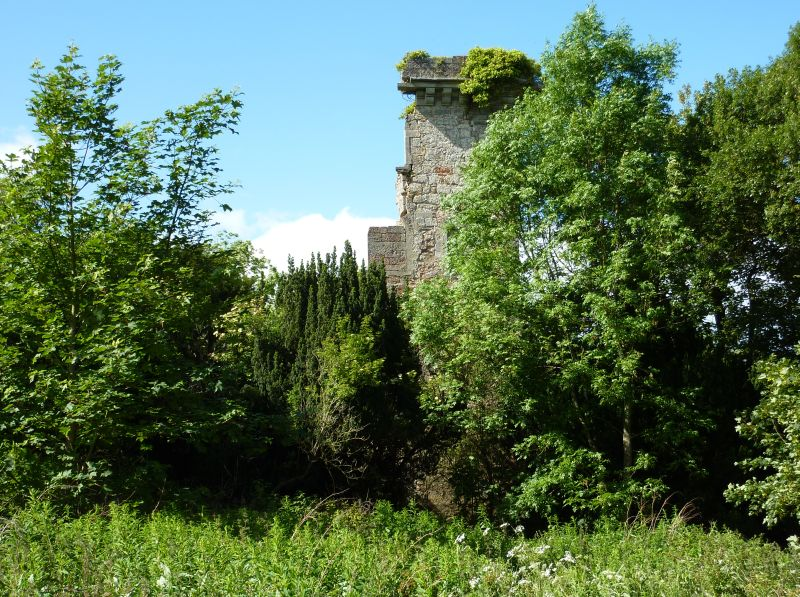
Elphinstone Tower, near Airth

Alexander Elphinstone, 2nd Lord Elphinstone (1511-1547) was a Scottish landowner.

Alexander Elphinstone was the son of Alexander Elphinstone, 1st Lord Elphinstone, and Elizabeth Barlow, an English gentlewoman in the household of Margaret Tudor.

Alexander became Lord Elphinstone after the death of his father at the Battle of Flodden in September 1513.

Lord Elphinstone died from wounds received at the Battle of Pinkie in September 1547.

== Family ==
Alexander Elphinstone married Katharine Erskine, daughter of John Erskine, 5th Lord Erskine, by his wife Lady Margaret Campbell, daughter of Archibald Campbell, 2nd Earl of Argyll and Elizabeth Stewart. Their children included;

- Robert Elphinstone, 3rd Lord Elphinstone
- Michael Elphinstone (1544-1625), Master of Household to James VI of Scotland.
- Elizabeth Elphinstone, who married David Somerville of Plean Castle
- Isobel Elphinstone, who married John Hamilton of Haggs.
- Margaret Elphinstone, who married John Livingstone younger of Dunipace.
- Margery Elphinstone, who married Robert Drummond of Carnock.

Peerage of Scotland
| Preceded by Alexander Elphinstone | Lord Elphinstone; 1513–1547 | Succeeded by Robert Elphinstone |
