= Arthur Elphinstone, 6th Lord Balmerino =

Scottish nobleman and officer in the Jacobite army

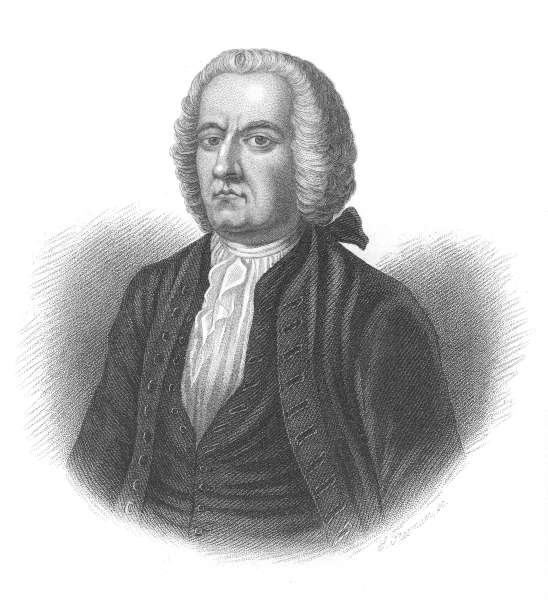
- Lord Balmerino; 19th century reproduction of a contemporary print
- Tenure: 1746
- Predecessor: James Elphinstone, 5th Lord Balmerino
- Born: Arthur Elphinstone; 1688; Leith
- Died: 18 August 1746 (aged 57–58); Tower Hill, London
- Cause of death: Execution by beheading
- Buried: St Peter ad Vincula
- Residence: Balmerino House, Leith
- Wars and battles: 1715 Jacobite Rising; Sheriffmuir; 1745 Jacobite Rising; Prestonpans Falkirk Culloden
- Spouse: Margaret Chalmers
- Parents: John, 4th Lord Balmerino; Anne Ross

Arthur Elphinstone, 6th Lord Balmerino (Note: Also spelt "Balmerinoch", and once often pronounced "Bemirrney" by locals (The Antiquary, v.II, 1872, 280)) and 5th Lord Cupar (1688 – 18 August 1746) was a Scottish nobleman and Jacobite, or supporter of the claim of the exiled House of Stuart to the British throne.

As a military officer, he served in both the British and French armies, as well as taking part in Jacobite rebellions in 1715 and 1745, and spent nearly 20 years in exile on the Continent. He was pardoned some years after the first rebellion but following the failure of the latter at Culloden he was taken prisoner, charged with treason, and executed at Tower Hill. Historians of the 1745 rising often refer to him simply as Lord Balmerino, although he did not inherit the title until January 1746 and was for most of his life styled "the Hon. Arthur Elphinstone".

== Biography ==
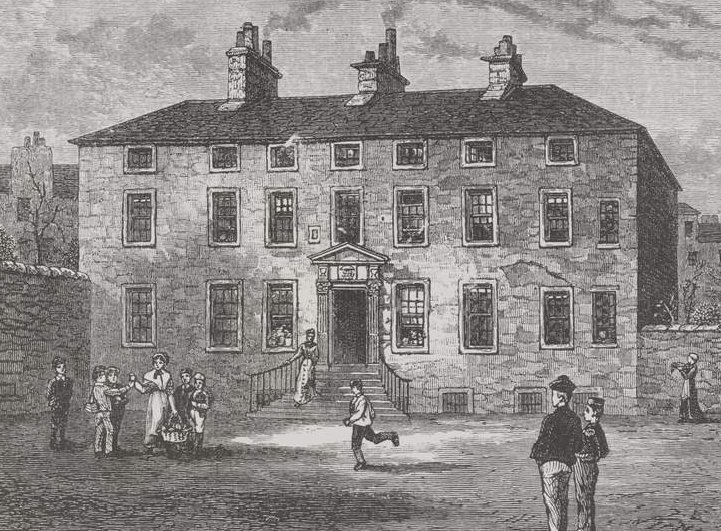
Lord Balmerino's House in Leith

Arthur Elphinstone was the son of John Elphinstone, 4th Lord Balmerino and 3rd Lord Cupar, and of his second wife, Anne Ross or Rose, daughter of Arthur Rose, Archbishop of St Andrews. He was born in Balmerino House in Leith and lived there most of his life.

The family descended from James (c. 1553–1612), a younger son of Robert Elphinstone, 3rd Lord Elphinstone: King James VI and I granted the lands of Balmerino Abbey in Fife to James Elphinstone in 1605, though by the 18th century a series of lawsuits had reduced the family's properties to the barony of Restalrig in South Leith. The Elphinstones were prominent members of the Episcopalian minority within Scotland: the burying ground of the ruined church at Restalrig on their estate was used by local Episcopalians throughout the 18th century.

Arthur had three half-brothers from his father's first marriage; Hugh, Master of Balmerino, who died in 1708 at the Siege of Lille, James (1675–1746), a lawyer and judge, and Alexander (d. 1733). (Note: Alexander Elphinstone is remembered for playing (in 1724) the first ever golf match reported in a newspaper, against Captain John Porteous.) He was not initially expected to inherit the family estate and embarked on a military career, being commissioned a captain in Lord Shannon's regiment in March 1714.

As a north-eastern Episcopalian Protestant, Elphinstone has been described as epitomising the most "ideologically committed" Jacobite supporters. (Many Scottish Episcopalians were conservatives who believed the deposition of the Stuarts to have been a breach of natural order, and who also opposed the 1707 Union of England and Scotland.) During the Jacobite rising of 1715 he fought at the inconclusive Battle of Sheriffmuir on the government side but, reportedly finding this "against his conscience", deserted and joined the Jacobites. The rising subsequently collapsed and he fled the country, possibly to Denmark, before joining the French army.

In 1733 Elphinstone's father obtained a pardon for him, and he eventually returned to Scotland: about this time he married Margaret Chalmers or Chambers, daughter of a Captain Chalmers of Leith. His half-brother James succeeded to the title of Lord Balmerino on the death of their father in 1736.

Elphinstone was one of the first to join Charles Edward Stuart during his 1745 attempt to recover the British throne for the Stuarts. While his record of Jacobite activity was undoubtedly a factor, some contemporaries also suggested that the family's poor financial standing meant he had little to lose. Alongside David Wemyss, Lord Elcho, he was given command of a troop of Charles' "Life Guard"; unlike nearly all other senior Jacobites, he was spared any criticism in the post-rising memoirs by various participants. John Daniel, a colleague in 1745, recorded that Elphinstone's "sole and predominant passion" was "hard drinking", but paid tribute to his loyalty, courage, and gift for languages, noting that "his memory for his years was wonderful". He became the 6th Lord Balmerino on 5 January 1746 following his half-brother James's death, but in April of the same year he was taken prisoner at the Battle of Culloden.

Balmerino was tried before Parliament, along with William Boyd, 4th Earl of Kilmarnock and George Mackenzie, 3rd Earl of Cromartie. Given his history and previous pardon, he represented himself and offered little in the way of a defence, joking that he only pleaded not guilty in order "that so many ladies might not be disappointed of their show". He was found guilty, attainted and beheaded on the same day as the Earl of Kilmarnock.

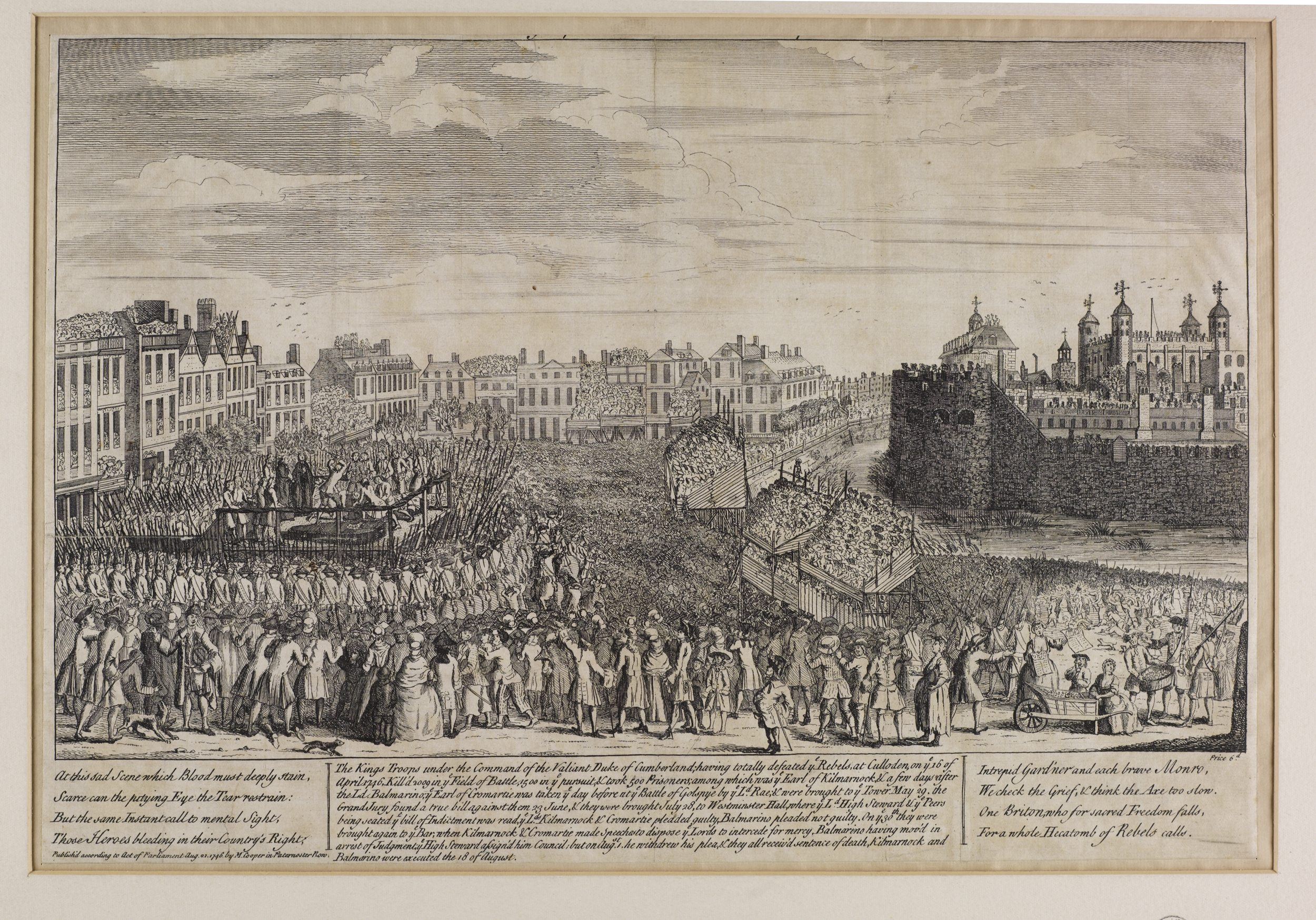
Execution of the Earl of Kilmarnock and Lord Balmerino

Balmerino went to his execution unrepentant, stating "If I had a thousand lives, I would lay them all down in the same cause". His insouciant attitude at the time of his trial and execution – joking with bystanders and insisting on taking the axe in his carriage so that Kilmarnock would not be bothered by it – was widely reported in the media of the time. Horace Walpole, in a letter, described him as "the most natural brave old fellow I ever saw [...] at the bar he behaved like a soldier and a man: in the intervals of form, with carelessness and humour". Balmerino's execution is sometimes reported to have taken three blows, though "the first certainly took away all sensation". Like Kilmarnock, he was buried in the Church of St Peter ad Vincula in the Tower of London: reportedly, at his request, alongside William Murray, Marquess of Tullibardine.

His home, Balmerino House in Leith, was confiscated by the Crown, which also took over his patronage of South Leith Parish Church. The Crown sold Balmerino House to James Stuart, 8th Earl of Moray in 1755. He sold it on to Lady Baird of Newbyth, and in 1762, on her death, it passed to her brother, General St. Clair of St. Clair. After being purchased by William Sibbald, a Leith merchant, it was sold to the Catholic Church in 1848 for £1800 to build a convent and Roman Catholic church in its extensive grounds.

== Family ==
He was married to Margaret Chalmers daughter of Captain Chalmers of Leith but they had no children.

== Notes ==
Peerage of Scotland
Preceded by James Elphinstone	Lord Balmerino; Lord Coupar; 1746	Forfeit
