= Robert Elphinstone, 3rd Lord Elphinstone =

Scottish landowner and courtier (1530-1602)

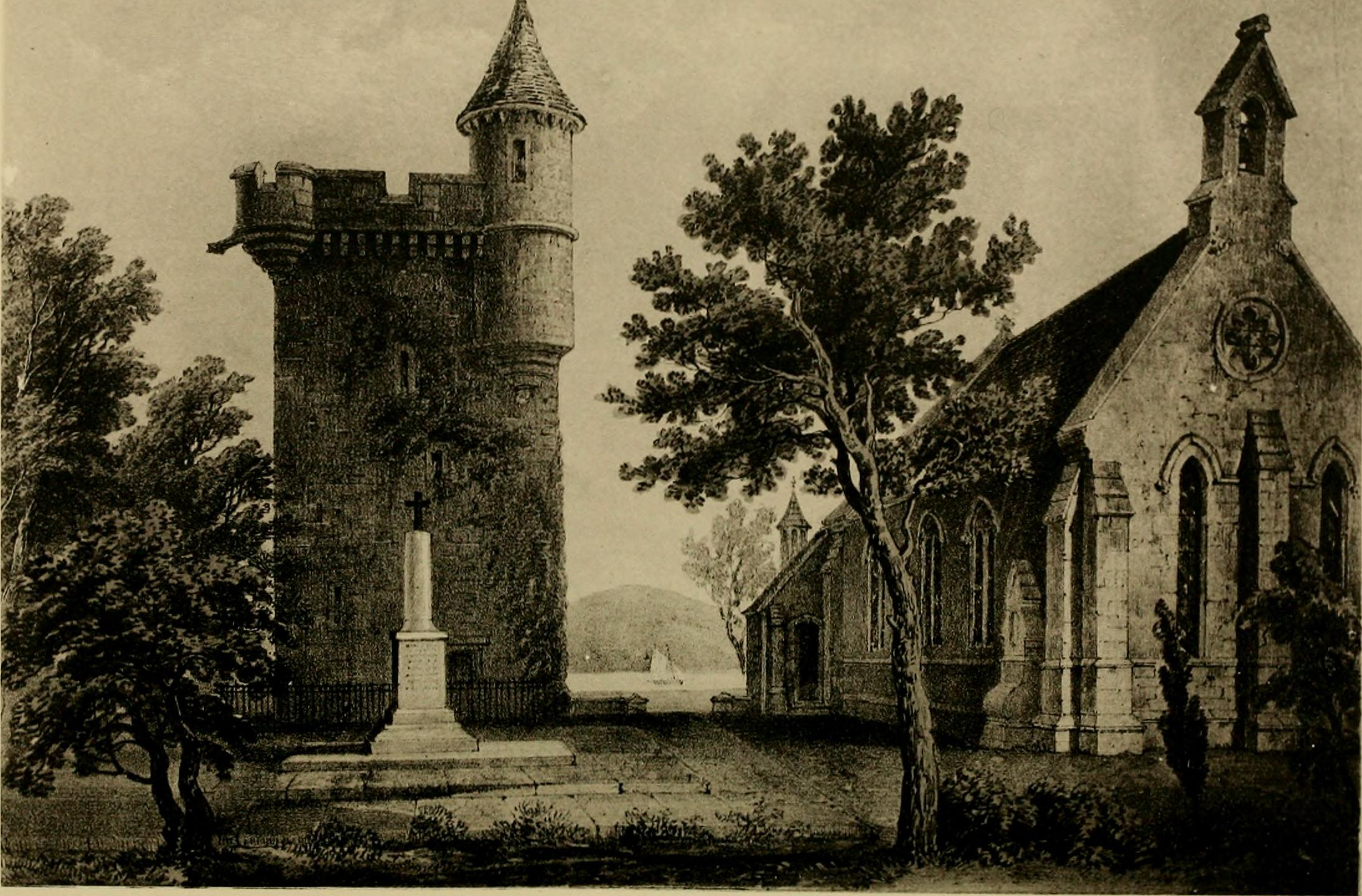
Elphinstone Tower the home of Lord Elphinstone, in 1897.

Robert Elphinstone, 3rd Lord Elphinstone (1530-1602) was a Scottish landowner and courtier.

Robert Elphinstone was the son of Alexander Elphinstone, 2nd Lord Elphinstone and Katherine Erskine, daughter of John Erskine, 5th Lord Erskine and his wife Lady Margaret Campbell, daughter of Archibald Campbell, 2nd Earl of Argyll and Elizabeth Stewart. His great-aunt Euphemia Elphinstone was a mistress of James V of Scotland and the mother of Robert, Earl of Orkney.

The Elphinstone lands were to the east of Stirling near Airth and the Forth, centered on Elphinstone Tower.

His sister Margery Elphinstone married his neighbour Robert Drummond of Carnock in the 1540s. Their coat of arms from Carnock House was obtained by Harold Nicolson and Vita Sackville-West had it displayed at Sissinghurst Castle.

Robert became Lord Elphinstone after the death of his father at the Battle of Pinkie on 10 September 1547.

On 16 May 1554, because he had made poor decisions about his properties in his youth, Lord Elphinstone put his affairs in the hands of his grandfather Lord Erskine, his father-in-law John Drummond of Innerpeffray, and his brothers-in-law Robert Drummond of Carnock and John Hamilton of Haggs. This transaction was enacted before Mary of Guise and the Privy Council of Scotland in her presence chamber at Stirling Castle. Subsequently, the Elphinstones and Erskines continued a feud.

In May 1565, his brother-in-law Alexander Drummond of Midhope Castle was charged with conspiring with Lady Elphinstone to defraud Lord Elphinstone of his income over the past three years. However, there does not seem to have been a trial, or any further evidence of bad feeling between Elphinstone and his wife and the Drummonds of Midhope.

In April 1567 it was said that Lord Elphinstone had avoided signing the Ainslie Tavern Bond which would have pledged his support for the Earl of Bothwell. In May 1568, because he was a supporter of Mary, Queen of Scots, Regent Moray ordered him to surrender Elphinstone Tower.

In 1577 he was said to be a Catholic and still a supporter of the exiled Mary, Queen of Scots. In that year he transferred his estates to his eldest son, Alexander, Master of Elphinsone.

Lord Elphinstone was in London in 1592 and returned in November.

Robert, Lord Elphinstone, died on 18 May 1602 and was buried in the kirk of Airth.

== Family ==
Robert Elphinstone married Margaret Drummond, daughter of John Drummond of Innerpeffray and Margaret Stewart, a daughter of James IV of Scotland. Their children included;

- Alexander Elphinstone, 4th Lord Elphinstone
- James Elphinstone, 1st Lord Balmerino
- Father George Elphinstone, Rector of the Scots College in Rome.
- Sir John Elphinstone of Selmis and Baberton, a gentleman in the household of Anne of Denmark. He attended James VI and Anne of Denmark at the wedding celebrations of Marie Stewart, Countess of Mar at Alloa in December 1592. He was a friend of Arbella Stuart.
- Janet Elphinstone, who married Patrick Barclay of Towie.
- Margaret Elphinstone, who married John Cunningham of Drumquhassell in 1587.

Peerage of Scotland
Preceded by Alexander Elphinstone	Lord Elphinstone; 1547–1602	Succeeded by Alexander Elphinstone
