= Hew Campbell of Loudon =

Scottish landowner

Hew Campbell of Loudon (died 1561) was a Scottish landowner.

He was a son of Hugh Campbell of Loudon and Isobel Wallace.

Campbell was Sheriff of Ayr. His first name is sometimes spelled "Hugh" or "Huw". He signed his name "Hew Campbell".

Gilbert Kennedy, 2nd Earl of Cassillis (Scottish Gaelic: Gille-Brigte Mac Cinnéide) was murdered at Prestwick by followers of Hew Campbell in August 1527, over a quarrel about the lands of Turnberry. The Gaelic song 'Òran Bagraidh' may relate to this event.

== Marriage and family ==
Campbell married Elizabeth Stewart, a daughter of Matthew Stewart, 2nd Earl of Lennox and Elizabeth Hamilton.

He married secondly, Agnes Drummond, a daughter of John Drummond of Innerpeffray and Margaret Stewart.

His children included:

- Matthew Campbell of Loudon
- Margaret Campbell, who married Alexander Nisbet of Bankhead

After his death, his widow Agnes Drummond, married Hugh Montgomerie, 3rd Earl of Eglinton, and subsequently, Patrick Drummond, 3rd Lord Drummond.
