= Roderick MacLean =

Roderick MacLean may refer to:

- Roderick MacLean (politician) (1900–1962), Canadian politician
- Roderick MacLean (bishop) (died 1553), Scottish bishop of the Isles
- Roderick Maclean (c. 1854–1921), attempted assassin of Queen Victoria
