= Alexander Elphinstone, 4th Lord Elphinstone =

Scottish courtier, landowner and Lord Treasurer

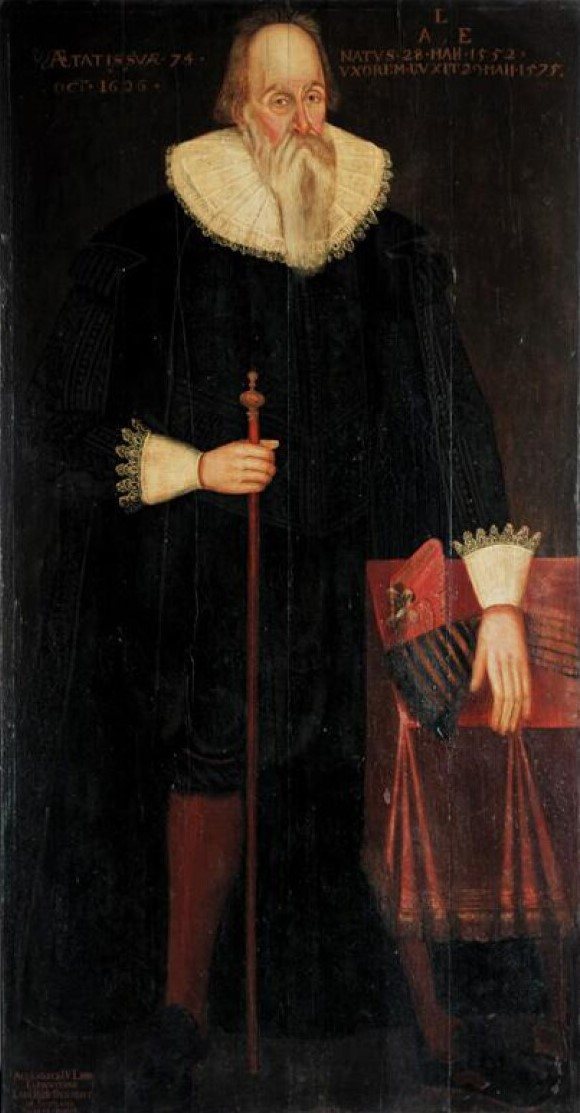
Portrait of Alexander, 4th Lord Elphinstone, Lord High Treasurer of Scotland

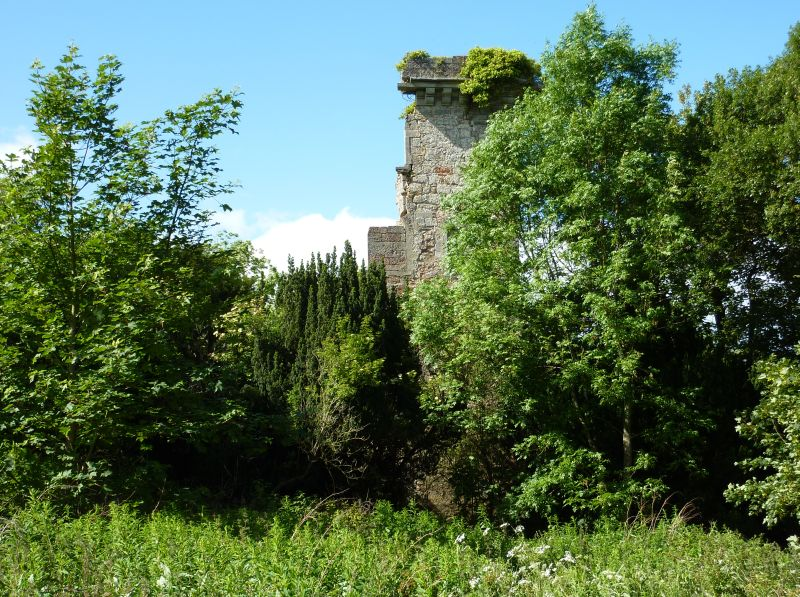
Elphinstone Tower near Airth

Alexander Elphinstone, 4th Lord Elphinstone (1552–1638), was a Scottish courtier, landowner, and Lord Treasurer.

Alexander Elphinstone was the son of Robert Elphinstone, 3rd Lord Elphinstone (1530–1602) and Margaret Drummond, daughter of Sir John Drummond of Innerpeffray and Margaret Stewart, daughter of James IV of Scotland.

The Elphinstone lands were to the south and east of Stirling centred on the settlement of Elphinstone and Dunmore near the Forth. His neighbours included the Drummonds of Carnock and Bannockburn and the Bruces of Airth. His family were longstanding rivals of the Erskine Earls of Mar.

Until his father's death in 1602, he was known as "Alexander, Master of Elphinstone". He joined the court of James VI as a gentleman of the bedchamber in October 1580.

In May 1585 Margaret Haldane, the wife of David Erskine, Commendator of Dryburgh, was held at Kildrummy Castle in the custody of the Master of Elphinstone. Francis Walsingham, at the instance of her brother, wrote to Edward Wotton, an English diplomat in Edinburgh, to ask that she be moved to more congenial location.

In March 1592 he was involved in the aftermath of the murder of James Stewart, 2nd Earl of Moray, the "Bonny Earl of Murray", as a friend of the Earl of Huntly, a prisoner in Blackness Castle. Elphinstone and three lairds went to Linlithgow Palace to see Moray's mother, Margaret Campbell, Lady Castle, and offered her his bond of £100,000 Scots that he would appear at court for his trial. The English ambassador Robert Bowes heard it was thought that Elphinstone would escort Huntly back to his home at Huntly Castle in the north.

In September 1595 his family, the Livingstones, Flemings, Bruces of Airth, and Livingstones of Dunipace were in open feud with the Earl of Mar, over the murder of Mar's servant David Foster or Forrester, and the earl was forbidden to approach them by the king. David Foster had been killed at Kirkliston by the Laird of Dunipace and young Laird of Airth on 24 June, and Mar had carried the body in a procession to Linlithgow and Stirling on 12 July with a painted banner showing the murder, which crossed his opponent's lands, leading to a tense situation. Walter Stewart of Blantyre and John Colville mediated in this quarrel. Colville believed that Anne of Denmark encouraged Elphinstone's faction against Mar, thinking that it would undermine's Mar's credibility as the keeper of Prince Henry at Stirling Castle.

In October 1597, James VI of Scotland wrote to him to deliver the prisoner Maws Livingstone, who had murdered his mother-in-law Agnes Fleming, Lady Livingstone, to Linlithgow Palace for her trial.

His brother James Elphinstone, 1st Lord Balmerino was a member of the group of courtiers and financial officers known as the Octavians. Another brother, John Elphinstone was a gentleman in the household of Anne of Denmark, whose duties included spending £4000 Scots of her dowry on clothes and costumes for the women of the household at the baptism of Prince Henry in August 1594.

Alexander, Master of Elphinstone, was appointed Treasurer of Scotland in 1599 following the resignation of Walter Stewart of Blantyre, until 1601. James VI ordered him to begin repairs on the Palace of Holyroodhouse in July 1600.

In 1601 his son Alexander attended Catholic mass in the house of Andrew Napier in Edinburgh, and he was imprisoned in Edinburgh Castle, until his father, who was very angry, arranged for him to be placed at St Andrews with the minister James Melville. James VI sent him a letter of remission, of forgiveness, on 24 April.

In 1608 he obtained a royal licence to export coal.

Alexander Elphinstone died in 1638.

== Family ==
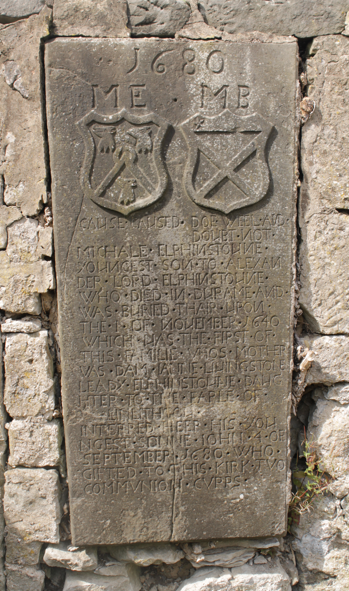
The grave of Michael Elphinstone and Mary Bruce, Old Larbert Graveyard

Alexander Elphinstone married Jean Livingston (d. 1621), daughter of William Livingstone, 6th Lord Livingston and Agnes Fleming (d. 1597), daughter of Malcolm Fleming, 3rd Lord Fleming and Lady Janet Stewart, a daughter of James IV. Their children included;

- Alexander Elphinstone, 5th Lord Elphinstone (1577–1648), educated at St Andrews University, who was known as the "Master of Elphinstone" until his father's death in 1638.
- Agnes or Annas Elphinstone (d. 1617) who married John Gordon, 13th Earl of Sutherland in a double wedding on 5 February 1600, with her sister Jean who married Arthur, Master of Forbes. The event was celebrated over two days in Elphinstone's lodging in the Royal Mint, or "Cunyiehous", in Edinburgh's Cowgate, with James VI and Anne of Denmark as house guests. As wedding gifts, James VI gave Agnes and Jean Elphinstone suites of gold and pearl accessories comprising, a necklace, a belt, and back and fore "garnishings" for their hair, which cost £1,333-6s-8d Scots. James VI had given a similar, but slightly less costly, ensemble to Agnes Boyd, the bride of George Elphinstone of Blythswood in August 1600. During the festivities in the Cunyiehous, James VI lost £82 playing at cards.
- Michael Elphinstone of Quarrel and East Skaithmure (1593–1640), who married Mary Bruce, daughter of Robert Bruce of Kinnaird. He died at Durham.
- Christian Elphinstone, who was contracted to marry Thomas Urquhart of Cromarty in 1606, and was the mother of the author Thomas Urquhart.

== Inventory of the Place of Elphinstone ==
After Lord Elphinstone died in 1638, an inventory was taken of his possessions at the Place of Elphinston, or Elphinstone Tower, which had been sealed in a coffer. The goods included his best clothes with "ane auld silk beaver hatt out of fashion", his books including John Williams's Great Britain's Solomon and John Smith's The Description of New England. A little box contained frivolous writs and missives, there was a brass clock to stand on a table, and velvet, damask, and leather cushions. In the tower there was a wine decanter with seven glasses, a brass warming-pan, and two cabinets with more worthless legal documents. Above the entry to the inner courtyard, the "mid yett", there was an iron clock with paces. All these items were taken up to a chamber at the head of the turnpike stair at the east end of the gallery, and locked up by the Depute Sheriff of Stirling, Thomas Craigengelt of Craigengelt.

Another document mentions the "New hall of the Place of Elphinstone" in December 1637, when Lord Elphinstone sold his velvet robes and saddles for attending the riding of the Parliament of Scotland to his son, Alexander, Master of Elphinstone.

Peerage of Scotland
| Preceded by Robert Elphinstone | Lord Elphinstone; 1602–1638 | Succeeded by Alexander Elphinstone |
