= Alexander Gordon (bishop of Galloway) =

Scottish churchman

- Bishop of Galloway
- Diocese: Galloway
- In office: 1559–1575
- Predecessor: Andrew Durie
- Successor: John Gordon
- Other post: Titular Archbishop of Athens (1551–75)
- Previous posts: Archbishop of Glasgow (1550–51); Bishop of the Isles (1554–59)

Orders
- Consecration: doubtful if ever consecrated

Personal details
- Born: c. 1516
- Died: 11 November 1575 (aged c. 59) Clary, Penninghame, Wigtownshire, Scotland
- Denomination: Church of Scotland prev. Roman Catholic
- Parents: John Gordon, Lord Gordon and Margaret Stewart
- Spouse: Barbara Logie
- Children: five sons and one daughter

Alexander Gordon (c. 1516 – 11 November 1575) was a 16th-century Scottish churchman who was successively Archbishop of Glasgow, Titular Archbishop of Athens, Bishop of the Isles and Bishop of Galloway.

== Biography ==
His father was John Gordon, Lord Gordon and his mother was Margaret Stewart, an illegitimate daughter of King James IV and Margaret Drummond. He was the brother of George Gordon, 4th Earl of Huntly, the ex-Chancellor of Scotland. He acquired his first ecclesiastic appointment, as administrator of Caithness, despite competition with Robert Stewart, brother of the Earl of Lennox. He was provided and consecrated to the archdiocese of Glasgow in the year 1550. This see was resigned to the pope in 1551, and he was given a pension and the title archbishop of Athens in partibus, along with the commendam of Inchaffray. In 1553, he was translated to the bishopric of the Isles (Sodor) at Iona. In 1559, after the death of the bishop of Galloway, Alexander was translated that bishopric. Alexander became a Protestant, and died on 11 November 1575.

In 1544, Alexander described himself as a servant of Francis I of France, and he was a loyal and well rewarded servant to the Queen Dowager, Mary of Guise. Apart from his ecclesiastical preferments, Guise gave him a yearly pension of £200 on 17 January 1547. The next year Alexander claimed poverty because Robert Stewart had possession of his Caithness rents, but he wrote that he would not tempted by English offers, 'for suppose poverty banish me from your grace's service, riches shall not cause me offend.' Alexander sent Mary of Guise a vivid account of the capture of Ferniehirst Castle from the French in February 1549. He was there in the company of his brother George, Earl of Huntly.

Alexander travelled through England to Scotland with a retinue of 12 followers in April 1553. Alexander preached at the wedding of his niece Jean Gordon to the Earl of Bothwell on 24 February 1566. A year later, Alexander was a signatory to Ainslie's Tavern Band in April 1567, agreeing to the marriage of Mary, Queen of Scots to Bothwell.

On 16 November 1571 he wrote from Edinburgh to the Earl of Shrewsbury, who was the keeper of Mary, Queen of Scots. He had promised to send Shrewsbury some hawks from the Earl of Huntly. Gordon described the Marian Civil War from the point of view of a supporter of Mary, saying the queen's enemies had suffered a defeat at Edinburgh, and in the north Adam Gordon of Auchindoun had a victory against the Clan Forbes at the battle of Tillieangus. He thought that Lord Hunsdon, Governor of Berwick-upon-Tweed was working on a peace deal.

He died in 1575.

== Family ==
John Gordon, future Bishop of Galloway, was the son of Alexander Gordon and his wife Barbara Logie. John seems to have been illegitimate; his parents married, perhaps clandestinely, only in 1546, before Alexander obtained ecclesiastical preferment.

== Sources ==
- Dowden, John (1912). Thomson, J. Maitland (ed.). The Bishops of Scotland. Glasgow: James Maclehose and Son.
- Scott, Hew (1928). Fasti Ecclesiae Scoticanae. Vol. 7 (New ed.). Edinburgh: Oliver and Boyd.

Religious titles
Preceded by Gavin Dunbar	Archbishop of Glasgow; 1550–1551	Succeeded by James Beaton II
Preceded by Roderick MacLean	Bishop of the Isles; 1554–1559	Succeeded by John Campbell
Preceded by Andrew Durie	Bishop of Galloway; 1559–1575	Succeeded by John Gordon
