= Abbot of Balmerino =

Head of the Cistercian monastic community

The Abbot of Balmerino (later Commendator of Balmerino) was the head of the Cistercian monastic community and lands of Balmerino Abbey, Fife, founded in 1227 x 1229 by monks from Melrose Abbey with the patronage of Ermengarde de Beaumont and King Alexander II of Scotland. The following are a list of abbots and commendators.

== List of abbots ==
- Alan, 1229-1236
- Radulf, 1236-1251
- John, 1251-1252
- Adam, 1252-1260
- Adam, 1260-1270
- William de Perisby, 1270
- Thomas, 1270x1306
- William, 1296
- Alan, 1317
- Hugh, x1369
- Patrick, 1369-1380x
- John Plater, x 1392
- John Gugy, x 1394-1399 x 1402
- John de Hailes, 1399x1402-1435x1436
- Richard de Coventry, 1436-1464
- William Cameron, 1436
- Henry Mason, 1450
- Walter Bunch, 1464
- James Rait, 1466-1468 x 1469
- William Bell, 1468-1483
- Walter Bunch (again), 1482-1486 x 1504
- Walter Ruch, 1483
- Henry Knollis, 1484
- Robert Fairweather, 1486
- James Forman, 1504-1507
- Robert Forrester, 1511-1559 x 1561
- Henry Roche, 1532
- John Stewart, 1535

== List of commendators ==
- John Hay, 1561-1573
- Henry Kinnear, 1574-1603
- John Kinnear, 1582
- Robert Auchmutie, 1604-1607

== Bibliography ==
- Cowan, Ian B. & Easson, David E., Medieval Religious Houses: Scotland With an Appendix on the Houses in the Isle of Man, Second Edition, (London, 1976), pp. 72–3
- Watt, D.E.R. & Shead, N.F. (eds.), The Heads of Religious Houses in Scotland from the 12th to the 16th Centuries, The Scottish Records Society, New Series, Volume 24, (Edinburgh, 2001), pp. 12–15

== See also ==
- Balmerino Abbey
