= Ainslie Tavern Bond =

16th-century document

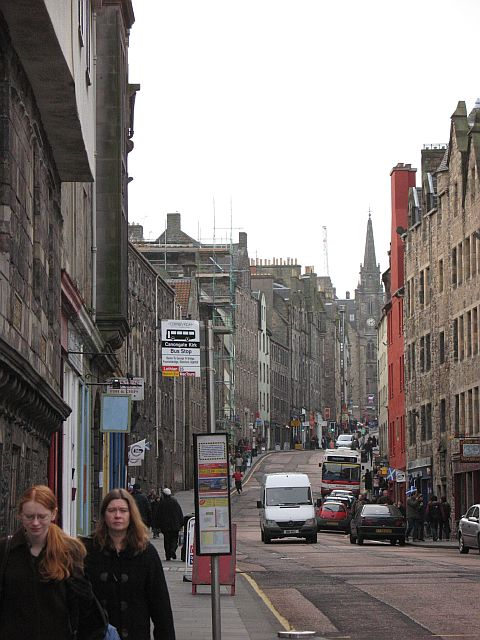
Ainslie's tavern was located in Edinburgh's Canongate

The Ainslie Tavern Bond (also known as the "Ainslie Band", or the "Ainslie Tavern Band") was a document signed on about 20 April 1567 by a number of Scottish bishops and nobles. The bond approved the Earl of Bothwell's acquittal on 12 April of implication in the murder of Lord Darnley, recommended him as an appropriate husband for Mary, Queen of Scots, and pledged to assist in defending such a marriage.

== Context ==
Lord Darnley had married Mary on 29 July 1565, but their marriage proved disastrous. On 9 March 1566, Mary's Italian private secretary, David Rizzio, was murdered in the Queen's presence at Holyrood. The murderers were led by Lord Ruthven, but it was widely believed that the murder arose from Darnley's jealousy. There followed a carefully choreographed series of events, aimed at substituting Bothwell for Darnley as Mary's husband. The extent of Mary's own complicity was and remains intensely controversial, but the preponderant view has been that she is likely to have been an accomplice in Bothwell's designs.

On 10 February 1567, the bodies of Darnley and his servant were discovered in Kirk o'Field in Edinburgh. Suspicion immediately fell on Bothwell. On 12 April 1567, he was formally acquitted of involvement in Darnley's murder, but suspicions about the nature of his trial were not allayed by the fact that he had attended the meeting of the Privy Council at which the trial had been arranged.

== The Bond ==
Following his acquittal, Bothwell invited the leading temporal and spiritual peers to a dinner in an Edinburgh tavern, kept by one Ainslie, as a result of which the event became known as "Ainslie's Supper" and the document associated with it "the Ainslie Tavern Bond". The bond was subscribed by eight bishops, nine earls and seven lords. It was subsequently alleged that Mary had previously on 19 April 1567 signed a warrant authorising the Lords to sign the Bond. Other sources suggest that the Bond was ratified by the Queen following its execution.

William Kirkcaldy of Grange, a political opponent of Bothwell, wrote about the making of the bond and Mary's affection for Bothwell in a letter to the Earl of Bedford:

The same night the Parliament was dissolved, Bothwell called most of the noblemen to supper, for to desire of them their promise in writing and consent to the Queen's marriage, which he will obtain, for she has said she cares not to lose France, England and her own country for him, and shall go with him to the world's end in a white petticoat or she leave him".

The historian Julian Goodare notes that only one of various texts of the bond mentions "Aynsley's supper". He suggests an alternative reading, that the Lords convened to discuss the bond in Bothwell's lodging in Edinburgh and Ainslie was the caterer who provided the supper. Chronicle writers including James Melville of Halhill and Claude Nau describe a meeting in Bothwell's house or lodging in Holyrood Palace.

== Signatories ==
According to a note sent to William Cecil, the signatories were the Earl of Moray; the Earl of Argyll; the Earl of Huntly; the Earl of Cassillis; the Earl of Morton; the Earl of Sutherland; the Earl of Rothes; the Earl of Glencairn; and the Earl of Caithness with the Lord Boyd; the Lord Seton; the Lord Sinclair; the Lord Sempill; the Lord Oliphant; the Lord Ogilvie; the Lord Ross; Carlyle of Torthorwald; the Lord Herries; the Lord Home; and the Lord Innermeath. The Bishop of Ross and the Lord Elphinstone slipped away without signing.

Other copies add the Earl of Erroll, the Lord Glamis, the Lord Fleming and the Archbishop of St Andrews, with the Bishops of Aberdeen, Whithorn (Galloway), Dunblane, Brechin, Ross, and Orkney.

Julian Goodare notes that one copy of the bond text derives from the recollection of John Reid, an associate of the Earl of Morton. Goodare suggests that the signatories named by Reid were those aristocrats who planned and discussed the bond before the supper meeting.

== Aftermath ==
On 24 April 1567, Bothwell waylaid Mary on the road from Stirling (whether with or without her connivance) and conducted her to Dunbar Castle, where he allegedly ravished her. There remained significant obstacles to performance of the bond, not the least of which was the fact that Bothwell had married Lady Jean Gordon on 24 February 1566. Their marriage was formally annulled on 7 May 1567. A week later, on 15 May 1567, Bothwell and Mary were married at Holyrood, to the general scandal of Europe. The marriage divided Scotland into two camps, Mary's opposition being known as the Confederate Lords. At the Battle of Carberry Hill on 15 June 1567, Mary was defeated and captured and Bothwell escaped to Shetland and then Norway.

The bond of 19 April 1567 was discussed in at the York Conference in October 1568, and mentioned in the document called "Hay's Book of Articles", which narrates events from Darnley's murder to Moray's regency from the Confederate Lords' viewpoint. The articles say that the Lords were trapped at the supper into signing the bond.

The Earl of Morton became Regent of Scotland, and in 1581 he was put on trial and executed. Before he was beheaded, he told some kirk ministers that he had signed the bond on the queen's orders, "therefore I subscryvit to the quenis marriage with the erle Bothwell, as sindrie utheris of the nobilitie did, being chargit therunto be the quenis writ and command".
