= Balmerino Abbey =

Ruined abbey in Fife, Scotland

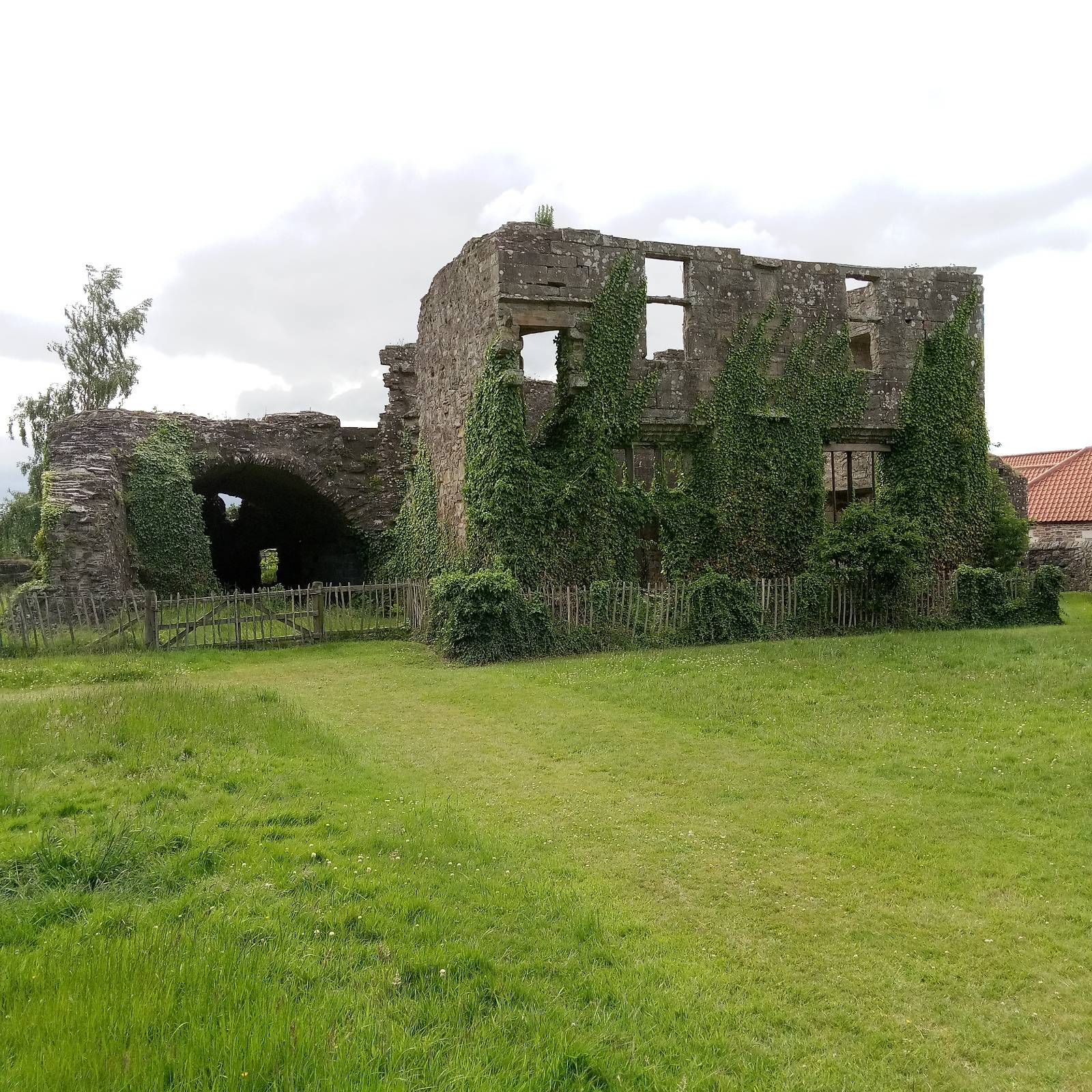
- The ivy-covered ruins of Balmerino Abbey in June 2026
- Interactive map of Balmerino Abbey

Monastery information
- Order: Cistercian
- Established: 1229
- Disestablished: 1603
- Mother house: Melrose Abbey
- Diocese: Diocese of St Andrews
- Controlled churches: Balmerino; Barry; Cultrain; Logie-Murdoch

People
- Founder: Ermengarde de Beaumont

Site
- Coordinates: 56.40975°N 3.04145°W

Scheduled monument
- Official name: Balmerino Abbey
- Designated: 28 April 1920
- Reference no.: SM827

Balmerino Abbey, or St Edward's Abbey, in Balmerino, Fife, Scotland, was a Cistercian monastery which has been ruinous since the 16th century.

== History ==
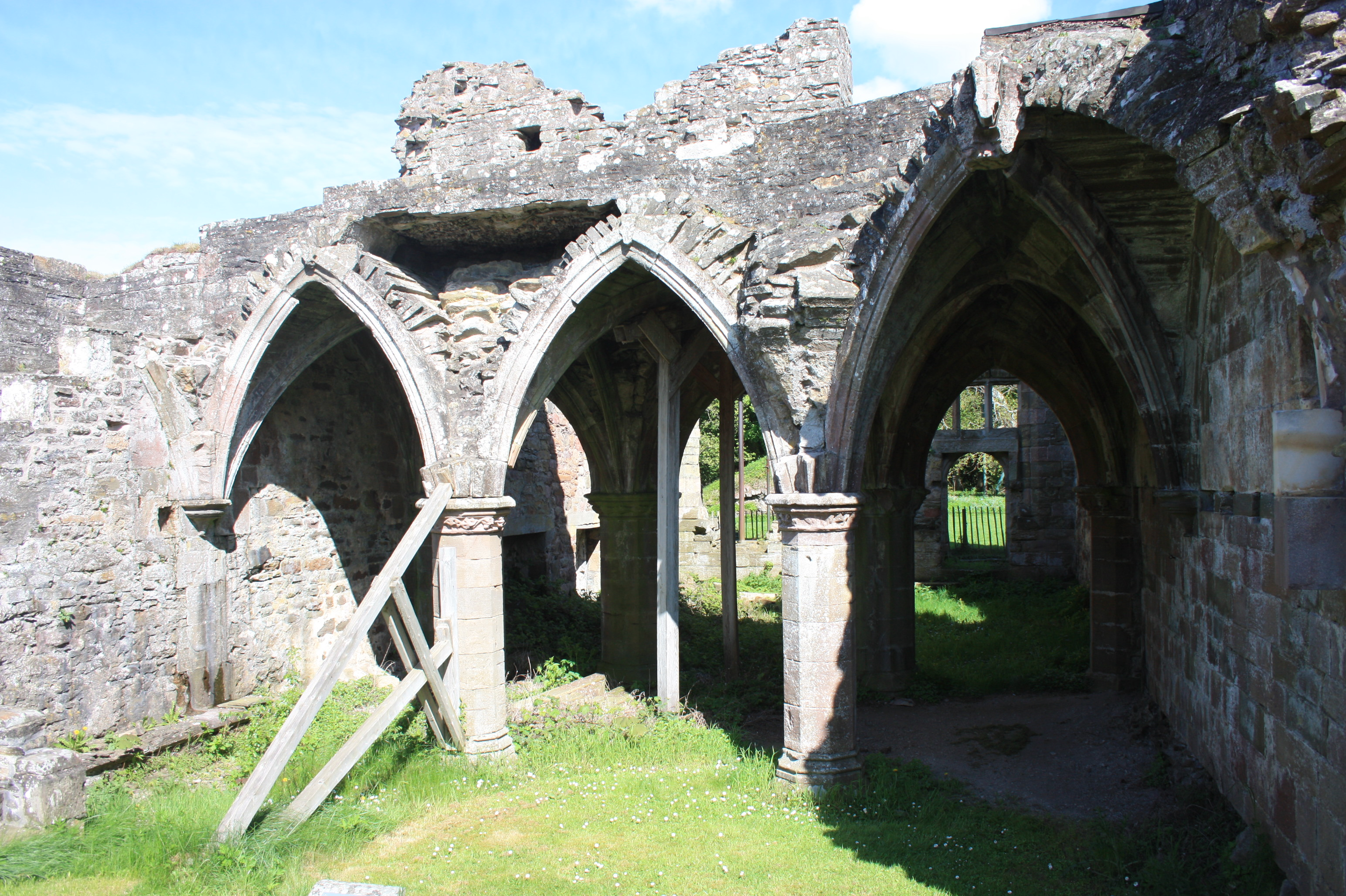
The chapter house of Balmerino Abbey

The Abbey was founded from 1227 to 1229 by monks from Melrose Abbey with the patronage of Ermengarde de Beaumont and King Alexander II of Scotland.

At the time the settlement here was known as Balmerinach, or St Merinac's Place: named after one of the monks who accompanied St Regulus (or St Rule) when he is said to have brought the bones of St Andrew to Scotland in 347. On this basis, Balmerino Abbey may have been founded on a site first chosen for a chapel nearly nine centuries earlier by St Merinac.

By 1233 the church was sufficiently complete for Ermengarde to be buried in it. It remained a daughter house of Melrose. It had approximately 20 monks at the beginning of the sixteenth century, but declined in that century.

The Abbey became the biggest monastic controller of salmon fisheries on the Firth of Tay, with salmon exports becoming its principal source of income in the later Middle Ages.

During the war of the Rough Wooing, the Abbey was burned by an English force in December 1547. The English commander Thomas Wyndham wrote of nuns and gentlemen's daughters who were at school with them. Balmerino Abbey was allegedly damaged again in 1559 by Scottish Protestants as part of the Reformation's destruction of perceived idolatrous structures. The community appears to have died out shortly afterwards, with the estate being made into a temporal lordship in 1603 (other sources give 1605 or 1606-7) for Sir James Elphistone, who became 1st Lord Balmerino.

In 1561 John Hay became the lay commendator and converted some of the abbey buildings for use as a house, with superfluous buildings like the church being dismantled for stone. Eventually the house itself fell into ruin.

Due to growing interest in the middle ages, in 1896 the ruins were archaeologically excavated, uncovering the plan of the church. In 1910 the landowner employed Francis William Deas to survey the building and execute a program of repairs and consolidation.

== Current condition ==
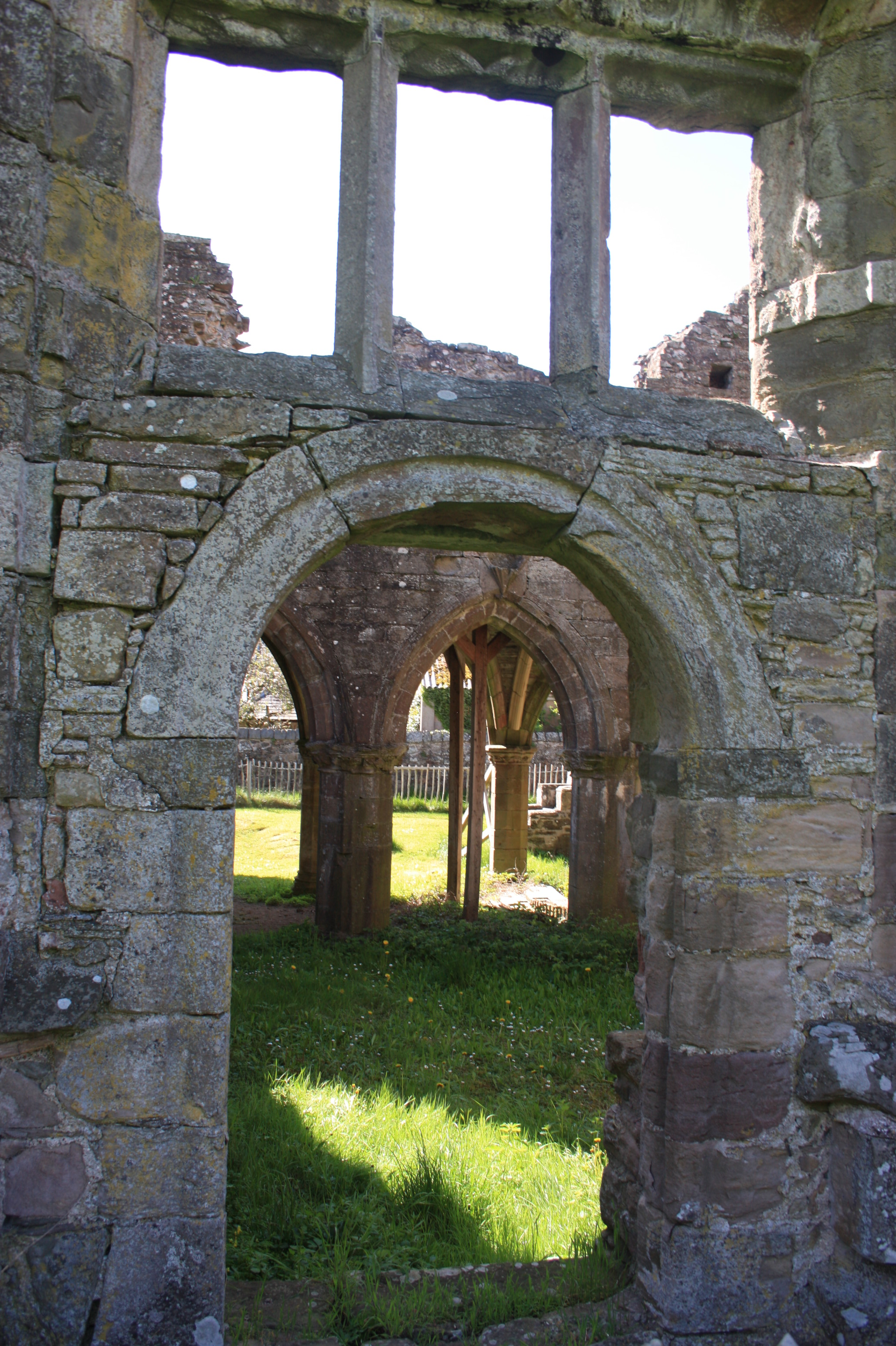
Window and door details at Balmerino Abbey

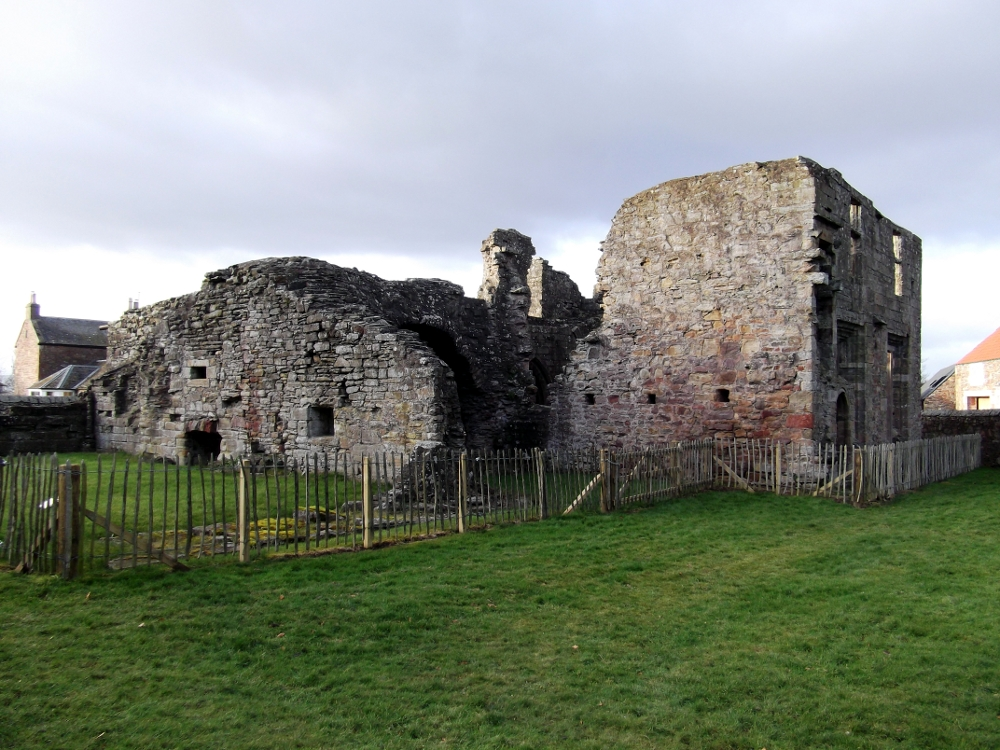
Balmerino Abbey as seen in 2012

The abbey is now under the stewardship of the National Trust for Scotland, and a small entrance fee is requested at an honesty box, with no ticket booth or staffed presence on-site. The grounds claim to include the oldest tree in Fife, a 400-year-old Spanish chestnut tree.

Meagre remains stand of the 66m long cruciform abbey church (mostly the north wall of the nave). The misalignment of the piers in the south arcade with the shafts in the north wall suggests that the single nave aisle was a later addition. The eastern range of the claustral buildings survives better, due to its conversion to a house after the Reformation. Immediately north of the church is the vaulted sacristy. This room became the house's kitchen, with a staircase added to its west. The original chapter house is the best survival of 13th century buildings, with the eastern three of its six bays of quadripartite vaulting still standing. The day stair rises through the thickness of its north wall. In the 15th century, a new and larger chapter house was added, with four bays of high vaulting round a central pier (as can still be seen at Glasgow Cathedral or Glenluce Abbey). This vaulting was destroyed when new floors and large windows were inserted in the residential conversion. Completing the range to the north is the slype or parlour, and then two further barrel-vaulted cells under the reredorter. The dormitory that stood over all these rooms has vanished, as have the cloister itself (which was unusually to the north of the church) and the north and west ranges containing the refectory, stores and guest rooms.

Access to the ruins is currently restricted due to their poor state of repair. As of summer 2007, a sign on-site states that entrance fees will be used to contribute towards a possible future stabilisation of these ruins to improve safety for visitors to enter again.

The ruins are designated as a scheduled monument.

== Burials ==
- Ermengarde de Beaumont, Queen of Scotland

== See also ==
- Abbot of Balmerino
- Lord Balmerino
- Scheduled monuments in Fife

== Bibliography ==
- Cowan, Ian B. & Easson, David E., Medieval Religious Houses: Scotland With an Appendix on the Houses in the Isle of Man, Second Edition, (London, 1976), pp. 72–3
- Dixon, Piers, 'Balmerino Abbey: Resurvey and Topographic Analysis', in T. Kinder (ed.), Life on the Edge: the Cistercian Abbey of Balmerino, Fife (Citeaux, Commentarii cistercienses 59)(Forges-Chimay 2008), pp. 163–67
- Fawcett, Richard, 'Balmerino Abbey: the Architecture', in T. Kinder (ed.), Life on the Edge: the Cistercian Abbey of Balmerino, Fife (Citeaux, Commentarii cistercienses 59)(Forges-Chimay 2008), pp. 81–118
- Hammond, Matthew, 'Queen Ermengarde and the Abbey of St Edward, Balmerino', in T. Kinder (ed.), Life on the Edge: the Cistercian Abbey of Balmerino, Fife (Citeaux, Commentarii cistercienses 59)(Forges-Chimay 2008), pp. 11–35
- Kerr, Julie, 'Balmerino Abbey: Cistercians on the East Coast of Fife', in T. Kinder (ed.), Life on the Edge: the Cistercian Abbey of Balmerino, Fife (Citeaux, Commentarii cistercienses 59)(Forges-Chimay 2008), pp. 37–60
- Márkus, Gilbert, 'Reading the Place-Names of a Monastic Landscape', in T. Kinder (ed.), Life on the Edge: the Cistercian Abbey of Balmerino, Fife (Citeaux, Commentarii cistercienses 59)(Forges-Chimay 2008), pp. 119–62
- Oram, Richard D., 'A Fit and Ample Endowment? The Balmerino Estate, 1228-1603', in T. Kinder (ed.), Life on the Edge: the Cistercian Abbey of Balmerino, Fife (Citeaux, Commentarii cistercienses 59)(Forges-Chimay 2008), pp. 61–80
- Watt, D.E.R. & Shead, N.F. (eds.), The Heads of Religious Houses in Scotland from the 12th to the 16th Centuries, The Scottish Records Society, New Series, Volume 24, (Edinburgh, 2001), pp. 12–15
