= John Gordon, Lord Gordon =

Scottish nobleman

John Gordon
- Lord Gordon
- Predecessor: Alexander Gordon, 3rd Earl of Huntly
- Died: 1517
- Spouse: Margaret Stewart, Lady Gordon
- Issue: George Gordon, 4th Earl of Huntly; Alexander Gordon, Bishop of Galloway; James Gordon, Chancellor of Moray
- Father: Alexander Gordon, 3rd Earl of Huntly

John Gordon, Lord Gordon (died 1517) was a Scottish nobleman.

He was second, but eldest surviving, son of Alexander Gordon, 3rd Earl of Huntly, and his first wife Lady Jean Stewart, daughter of the Earl of Athol.

He married Margaret Stewart, an illegitimate daughter of James IV of Scotland by his mistress Margaret Drummond, before 26 April 1510, the date of their marriage grant. John and Margaret were granted Badenoch and other lands by her father, the king, in 1510.

John Gordon died in 1517 in Perth, Scotland and was buried at Kinloss Abbey in Moray. Since he predeceased his father, the earldom passed to his eldest son, George Gordon, 4th Earl of Huntly. His second son was Alexander Gordon, Archbishop of Glasgow, the Isles, and Galloway. The third son was James Gordon Chancellor of Moray. Margaret his widow married Sir John Drummond of Innerpeffray.
