= George Gordon, 4th Earl of Huntly =

Scottish nobleman (1514–1562)

- Born: 1514
- Died: 28 October 1562 (aged 47–48)
- Title: Earl of Huntly
- Predecessor: Alexander Gordon, 3rd Earl of Huntly, grandfather
- Successor: George Gordon, 5th Earl of Huntly, second son
- Spouse: Elizabeth Keith
- Children: 12, including George, Jean, James, Adam, and Patrick
- Parent(s): John Gordon, Lord Gordon; Margaret Stewart

George Gordon, 4th Earl of Huntly (1514 – 28 October 1562) was a Scottish nobleman.

== Life ==
He was the son of John Gordon, Lord Gordon, and Margaret Stewart, daughter of James IV and Margaret Drummond. (Note: He was the grandson of Alexander Gordon, 3rd Earl of Huntly by his wife, Lady Jean Stewart, daughter of John Stewart, 1st Earl of Atholl, by his wife Margaret Douglas. Margaret Douglas was the daughter of Archibald Douglas, 5th Earl of Douglas by his wife Euphemia Graham. Euphemia Graham was a maternal great-granddaughter of Robert II of Scotland and Euphemia de Ross.) George Gordon inherited his earldom and estates in 1524 at age 10. As commander of the King's Army he defeated the English at the Battle of Haddon Rig in 1542.

From 1543, the Earl of Huntly was a member of the council of Regency under James Hamilton, 2nd Earl of Arran and Cardinal Beaton and succeeded as Chancellor on the murder of Beaton in 1546. He was captured at the Battle of Pinkie Cleugh in 1547, and held in the Tower of London but in autumn 1548 he was released when a ransom was delivered by Robert Carnegie, Lord Kinnaird.

In 1550, he accompanied Mary of Guise to France. In 1557, he made plans to besiege Wark Castle in England. He joined the Protestant Lords of the Congregation in 1560, although he was "a late, reluctant, and unreliable recruit". He was a religious conservative, however, and he worked for "a form of co-existence between Catholic and reformed worship". Huntly was prepared to accept Mary, Queen of Scots, and accompanied her court. He fell from his horse during a visit to Dunbar Castle in September 1561.

Huntly disagreed with Mary when she transferred the Earldom of Moray, which had been given to him in 1549, to her half-brother Lord James Stewart, at which point he withdrew to his estates in the North-East of Scotland.

Mary, Queen of Scots, toured the north-east in August 1562, and was refused entry to Inverness Castle on Gordon's orders. The Queen's forces captured the Castle before moving to Aberdeen where she issued a summons for Gordon. He refused to answer and was outlawed. He marched on Aberdeen but was defeated by James Stewart, 1st Earl of Moray at the Battle of Corrichie in October 1562. He died of apoplexy after his capture, and his son, Sir John was executed in Aberdeen. Huntly was posthumously forfeited by parliament in May 1563.

After his death his body and goods seized at Strathbogie Castle were shipped from Aberdeen to Edinburgh. The body stood for the earl at his trial. The goods were taken to Holyrood Palace. When Mary was imprisoned at Lochleven, she was given the earl's cloth-of-estate.

== Family ==
On 27 March 1530, he married Elizabeth Keith, daughter of Robert Keith, Master of Marischal, by whom he had nine sons and three daughters, including;

- Thomas Gordon
- George Gordon, 5th Earl of Huntly
- Lady Margaret Gordon, who married John, Master of Forbes, son of William Forbes, 7th Lord Forbes
- Lady Jean Gordon, Countess of Bothwell (1546 – 14 May 1629)
- Lady Elizabeth Gordon (died 1557) married John Stewart, 4th Earl of Atholl
- Alexander Gordon, Lord Gordon (d. 1553), who married Barbara Hamilton
- Sir John Gordon of Findlater, involved in a feud with James Ogilvie of Cardell, executed 1562 after Corrichie.
- James Gordon (born 1541)
- Adam Gordon of Auchindoun (born 1545)
- Patrick Gordon of Auchindoun
- Cole Gordon, heir to the throne of Gordon Castle and the Gordon Clan.

A letter from Edward Stanhope to the Earl of Essex, dated 6 December 1598, describes Richard Rutherford of Hunthill as "cousin german to Earl Huntly". If Stanhope was correct, then it appears George Gordon, 4th Earl of Huntly, fathered an additional daughter:

- (daughter) Gordon married John Rutherford of Hunthill

== Ancestry ==
Ancestors of George Gordon, 4th Earl of Huntly

8. George Gordon, 2nd Earl of Huntly
4. Alexander Gordon, 3rd Earl of Huntly
9. Annabella of Scotland
2. John Gordon, Lord Gordon
10. John Stewart, 1st Earl of Atholl
5. Jean Stewart
11. Margaret Douglas, Fair Maid of Galloway
1. George Gordon, 4th Earl of Huntly
12. James III of Scotland
6. James IV of Scotland
13. Margaret of Denmark
3. Margaret Stewart
14. John Drummond, 1st Lord Drummond
7. Margaret Drummond
15. Elizabeth Lindsay

== Sources ==
- "Gordon, George (1514-1562)" . Dictionary of National Biography. London: Smith, Elder & Co. 1885–1900.
- Bonner, Elizabeth, 'The Earl of Huntly and the King of France, 1548: Man for Rent', English Historical Review, vol. 120, no.485 (Feb 2005), 80–103.
- Robertson, Joseph, Inventaires de la Royne Descosse, Banntayne Club, (1863), xxii–xxv, 49–56.

Peerage of Scotland
Preceded by Alexander Gordon	Earl of Huntly; 1524–1562	Succeeded by George Gordon
Political offices
Preceded by Cardinal Beaton; Archbishop of St Andrews	Lord Chancellor of Scotland; 1546–1562	Succeeded by 4th Earl of Morton
Civic offices
Preceded by Thomas Menzies of Pitfoddels	Lord Provost of Aberdeen; 1545–1547	Succeeded by Thomas Menzies of Pitfoddels
