= John Elphinstone, 2nd Lord Balmerino =

Scottish aristocrat (died 1649)

John Elphinstone, 2nd Lord Balmerino (died 28 February 1649) was a Scottish aristocrat, convicted in a celebrated trial of the 1630s which became a crux of the religious issue of the time.

== Early life ==
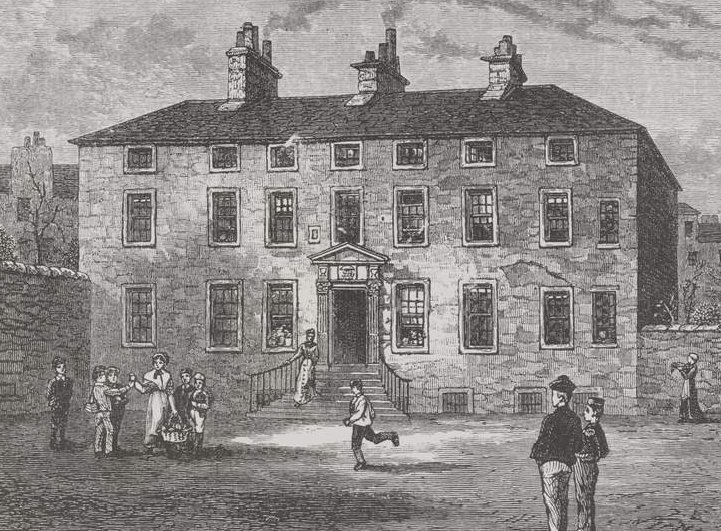
Lord Balmerino's House in Leith

He was the son of James, 1st Lord Balmerino, by his first wife, Sarah, daughter of Sir John Menteith of Carse. His father being under attainder when he died in 1613, the title did not devolve to him, but he was restored to blood and peerage by a letter under the great seal, 4 August 1613.

In 1643 he bought a magnificent mansion house in Leith which had been built in 1631. Guests in the house included Charles II in 1650. This survived until the 1950s when it sadly evaded the survey by the City Architect, Ebenezer James MacRae, as it was by then sandwiched between St Mary's Star of the Sea Church and tenements on the Kirkgate. It was consequently demolished as part of the Kirkgate clearances.

== Parliamentary context and the trial ==
He was a strenuous opponent of the ecclesiastical policy of Charles I in Scotland. In the parliament of 1633 he demonstrated his hostility to the act establishing the royal prerogative of imposing apparel upon churchmen. A majority of the members voted against the measure, but the clerk affirmed that the question was carried. When his decision was objected to, Charles, who was present, insisted that it must be held good unless the clerk were accused from the bar of falsifying the records. This being a capital offence, the accuser was liable to the punishment of death if he failed in the proof, and the decision was not further challenged.

William Haig of Bemersyde, solicitor to James VI, and one of those opposed to the measure, drew up a petition, setting forth their grievances and praying for redress. It was couched in rather plain language and asserted that the recent ecclesiastical legislation had imposed a servitude. Charles declined to look at it, and ordered a stop to be put to all such proceedings. Balmerino retained a copy, and having interlined it in some places he showed to his confidential agent, Dunmore. Through a breach of confidence it was forwarded by a friend of Dunmore's to John Spottiswoode, who laid the matter before the king.

Haig escaped to the continent, but Balmerino was brought before Spottiswoode, who sent him to Edinburgh Castle, in June 1634. The trial was in the following March. In June he was indicted before the justice-general, William Hay, 10th Earl of Erroll, on the accusation of the king's advocate Sir Thomas Hope. The matter was ordered to be tried by a jury, the charge being narrowed down to the one count that he, knowing the author of what was held to be a dangerous and seditious libel, failed to discover him. Public opinion was on his side, but he was found guilty by eight to seven, and sentenced to death.

In a heated atmosphere, John Stewart, 1st Earl of Traquair went to Charles and represented to him that the execution was inadvisable. William Laud concurring, Balmerino was pardoned, but was ordered to be confined for life within six miles of his house at Balmerino. Afterwards he obtained full liberty.

== Later life ==
Balmerino was one of those who attended the meeting of the lords called by Lord Lorne, at which they began to make a determined stand against the introduction of High Church innovations in Reformed worship. Along with John Campbell, 1st Earl of Loudoun and John Leslie, 6th Earl of Rothes he revised the additions to the covenant in February 1638. In the assembly of 1638 he served on several committees, and on 3 October he signed the protest to the king's commissioner at Hamilton against his endeavours to induce the members of the assembly to sign the 'king's covenant'. He was also one of the principal advisers of the covenanters in sending a letter to Louis XIII against 'the tyrannical proceedings of their monarch.'

Balmerino was one of the most prominent supporters of Argyll (as Lorne became) in his policy against Charles. When the covenanters resolved to take up arms, he contributed at least forty thousand merks. Along with the Earl of Rothes and others went on 22 March 1639 to Dalkeith to demand the delivery to them of the palace by the lord treasurer Traquair, and to bring the royal ensigns of the kingdom, the crown, sword, and sceptre, to Edinburgh. At the opening of the Scottish parliament in August 1641, he was nominated president by the king and unanimously elected. On 17 September 1641 he was among the privy councillors nominated by the king, and then was approved of by the parliament (ib. 150). On 17 November he was chosen an extraordinary lord of session.

As a Lord of Session he required accommodation in or near Edinburgh and in 1643 he purchased a mansion from John Stewart, Earl of Carrick in the heart of Leith, Edinburgh's harbour town. This house was thereafter known as Balmerino House.

He accompanied General David Leslie in his march into England in 1643. In July 1644 he was nominated one of the commissioners to England. When, after the disastrous campaigns of Argyll, the command of the covenanters was entrusted to Sir William Baillie, Balmerino was one of those nominated to advise him. He died on 28 February 1649, of apoplexy in his own chamber in Edinburgh. He was buried in the vaulted cemetery of the Logan family, adjoining the church of Restalrig, but according to Scot of Scotstarvet, the New Model Army soldiers of Oliver Cromwell disinterred the body in 1660 while searching for leaden coffins, and threw it into the street.

== Family ==
He married Anne Ker, daughter of Sir Thomas Ker of Ferniehirst, and sister of Andrew and James, lords Jedburgh, and of Robert Car, Earl of Somerset. They had a son John, who succeeded him as third Lord. His wife died in Balmerino House in Leith on 15 February 1650 and was buried next to him in Restalrig Churchyard.

== Legacy ==
Balmerino House survived for many centuries but was hidden behind St Mary's Star of the Sea Church, after Catholic Emancipation allowed a Roman Catholic church and convent to be built within the garden ground. The house survived until the 1950s when it was overlooked in the survey of the area by Edinburgh Corporation, owing to it being sandwiched between houses on the Kirkgate and the church and convent. It was swept away with the medieval houses of the Kirkgate and replaced by Council housing.

== Notes ==
Parliament of Scotland
Preceded by The Earl of Traquair	Lord High Commissioner; 1641	Succeeded by The Duke of Hamilton
Peerage of Scotland
Preceded by James Elphinstone	Lord Balmerino; 1612–1649	Succeeded by John Elphinstone
