= Alexander Gordon, 3rd Earl of Huntly =

15th/16th-century Scottish earl

- Died: 21 January 1524; Perth, Scotland
- Noble family: Clan Gordon
- Spouses: Lady Jean Stewart; Elizabeth Gray
- Issue: Hon. John Gordon, Lord Gordon; Hon. Alexander Gordon of Strathavon; Hon. William Gordon, Bishop of Aberdeen; Jean Gordon, Countess of Argyll; Christian Gordon, Lady de Menzies; Marjory Gordon-Lumsden
- Father: George Gordon, 2nd Earl of Huntly
- Mother: Annabella of Scotland

Alexander Gordon, 3rd Earl of Huntly (died 1524) was a Scottish nobleman. He was a member of Parliament, a member of the Privy Council, a regent and Lieutenant of the kingdom.

== Biography ==
He was the son of George Gordon, 2nd Earl of Huntly and his second wife, Princess Annabella of Scotland, the youngest daughter of King James I of Scotland. (Note: There has been some uncertainty regarding Alexander's mother, whether she was Annabella Stewart (m. to Geo. Gordon c. 1460–1471) or Elizabeth Hay (m. 1471–1501). The fact that his father married Elizabeth Hay after 18 Aug 1471 [CP, vi, 677 & n. b.] and that Alexander himself was a member of parliament as well as being one of the Lords of the Articles in 1485 makes it chronologically implausible he could have been Elizabeth's son. Logic dictates he could not have held these positions of authority at age 13 or less. See: SP, IV, 529, 532; CP, VI, 677 n. f.)

As a favorite of King James IV of Scotland, he acquired considerable grants of land throughout his career. In 1500, he was made hereditary sheriff of Inverness, giving him considerable powers throughout the north of Scotland. A year later, in June 1501, he succeeded his father as the 3rd Earl of Huntly. He witnessed the marriage contract of James IV in 1503 and was engaged in quelling disturbances in the Isles in 1505. In 1509, he was awarded the comital Lordship of Lochaber.

Alexander fought in the Battle of Flodden on 9 September 1513, where he commanded the Scots left wing and was one of the fortunate few Scottish noblemen who escaped with his life. He was a member of the council of Regency in 1517 during the minority of King James V of Scotland and was appointed King's Lieutenant over all of Scotland excepting Argyle in 1517–18. He was a supporter of the Duke of Albany in his dispute with the Earl of Angus.

Alexander died on 21 January 1524 at Perth, and was buried in the choir of the church of the Blackfriars monastery. The same year he was succeeded by his grandson, George Gordon, 4th Earl of Huntly.

== Family ==
Alexander Gordon married by contract on 20 October 1474, Lady Jean Stewart, daughter of John Stewart, 1st Earl of Atholl and Lady Margaret Douglas, daughter of Archibald Douglas, 5th Earl of Douglas. Alexander and Jean had the following children:

- George Gordon, who was contracted to marry either Katherine or Elizabeth Campbell, daughters of Archibald Campbell, Earl of Argyll, and who seems to have died young
- Hon. John Gordon, Lord Gordon (died 1517), was the father of George Gordon, 4th Earl of Huntly.
- Hon. Alexander Gordon of Strathavon, married Janet Grant and had issue.
- Hon. William Gordon, Bishop of Aberdeen
- Lady Jean (or Janet) Gordon, married Colin Campbell, 3rd Earl of Argyll and Duncan Stewart, heir apparent to Allan Stewart of Appin
- Lady Christian Gordon, married Sir Robert de Menzies.
- Lady Marjory Gordon, married Thomas Lumsden, the Younger of Cushnie, who was killed at the Battle of Flodden.

After the death of his first wife, Alexander Gordon married Elizabeth Gray, daughter of Andrew Gray, 2nd Lord Gray and Janet Keith, some time after 27 July 1511. She built a house for herself in Perth, which passed into the ownership of the Ruthven family, and was known as Gowrie House. It was demolished in 1807.

== Notes ==
Peerage of Scotland
Preceded by George Gordon	Earl of Huntly; 1501–1524	Succeeded by George Gordon
