= Margaret Stewart, Lady Gordon =

Illegitimate daughter of James IV of Scotland (born ca 1497)

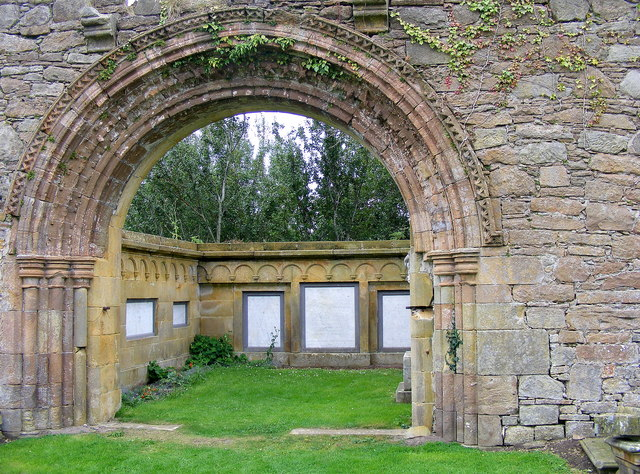
Margaret Stewart buried her first husband, Lord Gordon, at Kinloss Abbey

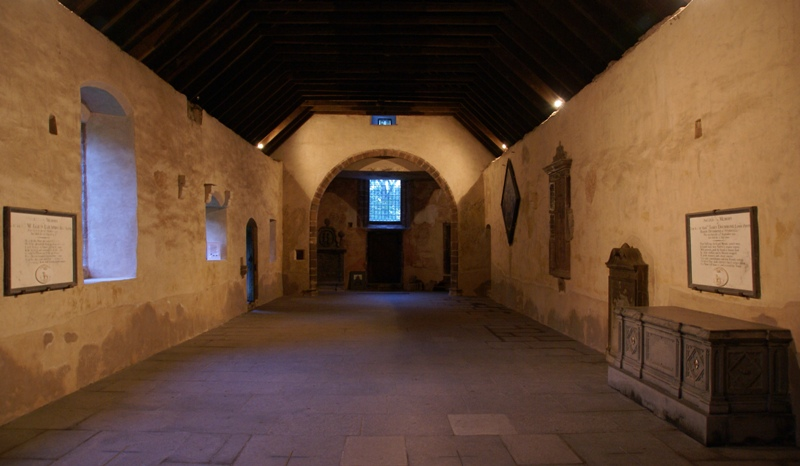
Margaret Stewart's second husband John Drummond was buried at the west end of Innerpeffray Collegiate Church

Margaret Stewart, Lady Gordon (born ca 1497) was the daughter of James IV of Scotland and his mistress Margaret Drummond.

== Early life ==
Margaret Stewart was born around 1497. Her mother, Margaret Drummond, was the daughter of John Drummond of Cargill, Lord Drummond, and his wife Elizabeth Lindsay. According to the Spanish ambassador Pedro de Ayala, King James IV kept Margaret Drummond "in great state" in a castle before arranging her married. Although no record of the marriage survives, she was granted the rents of land in Strathearn. Margaret Drummond died in 1502 and was buried at Dunblane Cathedral.

As a child, Margaret known as "Lady Margaret"— lived at Edinburgh Castle under the care of Sir Patrick Crichton and his wife, Katrine Turing. Her attendants and companions included Marjory Lindsay and the African servants Margaret and Ellen More, who were referred to in contemporary records as the "More lasses".

In February 1505, Lady Margaret started dancing lessons with a drummer called Guilliam. There were records of her clothing, including, in June 1506; a gown of brown or russet cloth bordered with velvet, with velvet sleeves lined with taffeta, a satin kirtle or skirt, a hat and a tippet, a veil of "crisp", and ribbons for her hair.

== Marriages and Family ==
She married, first, John Gordon, Lord Gordon, the son of Alexander Gordon, 3rd Earl of Huntly. Lord Gordon's aunt Catherine Gordon's first husband was Perkin Warbeck. She rode from the lowland royal court north over the Mounth towards Huntly Castle with her servants John Sinclair and Margaret Prestoun on 19 November 1512. It has been suggested that Margaret Prestoun was the sister of Ellen More. Their children included:

- George Gordon, 4th Earl of Huntly, m. Elizabeth Keith, Countess of Huntly
- Alexander Gordon (bishop of Galloway), m. Barbara Logie
- James Gordon, Chancellor of Moray

She married, secondly, on 20 January 1530/31, Sir John Drummond of Innerpeffray. After their marriage, James V of Scotland made John Drummond Forester of the Royal Forest of Glenartney in Strathearn. A charter making Innerpeffray a free barony in 1536 recognises Margaret Stewart as "sororis regis", the sister of the king.

Margaret and Sir John Drummond had five daughters, including:

- Agnes Drummond, m. (1) Hugh Campbell of Loudon, (2) Montgomerie, 3rd Earl of Eglinton, (3) Patrick Drummond
- Isabell Drummond, m. Matthew Campbell of Loudoun
- Margaret Drummond, m. Robert Elphinstone, 3rd Lord Elphinstone
- Jean Drummond, m. James Chisholm of Cromlix

The National Museums of Scotland has a group of carved oak panels, which include the heraldry of John Drummond and Margaret Stewart and may have decorated their residence in Edinburgh.

== Ancestors ==
Ancestors of Margaret Stewart, Lady Gordon

8. James II of Scotland
4. James III of Scotland
9. Mary of Guelders
2. James IV of Scotland
10. Christian I of Denmark
5. Margaret of Denmark
11. Dorothea of Brandenburg
1. Margaret Stewart, Lady Gordon
12. Sir Malcolm Drummond of Cargill and Stobhall
6. John Drummond, 1st Lord Drummond
13. Mariota Murray
3. Margaret Drummond
14. Alexander Lindsay, 4th Earl of Crawford
7. Elizabeth Lindsay
15. Margaret Dunbar
