= John Drummond, 1st Lord Drummond =

Scottish statesman

John Drummond
- Lord Drummond
- Predecessor: Sir Malcolm Drummond of Cargill and Stobhall
- Successor: David Drummond, 2nd Lord Drummond
- Other titles: Lord of Stobhall; Steward of Strathearn; Constable of Stirling Castle; Privy Councillor
- Died: 1519; Drummond Castle
- Noble family: Clan Drummond
- Spouse: Elizabeth Lindsay
- Issue: Malcolm Drummond; David Drummond; William Drummond; John Drummond; Margaret Drummond; Elizabeth Drummond; Beatrix Drummond; Annabella Drummond; Eupheme Drummond; Sibylla Drummond
- Father: Sir Malcolm Drummond of Cargill and Stobhall
- Mother: Mariota Murray

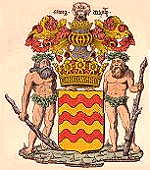
Coat of arms of the Drummond clan/familiy

Sir John Drummond, 1st Lord Drummond (died 1519), was a Scottish statesman.

Drummond, ninth successive knight of his family, was the eldest son of Sir Malcolm Drummond of Cargill and Stobhall, Perthshire, Chief of Clan Drummond (d. 1470), by his marriage in 1445 with Mariot or Mariota, eldest daughter of Sir David Murray of Tullibardine in the same county, and wife Margaret Colquhoun, paternal grandson of Sir Walter Drummond of Cargill and Stobhall, Chief of Clan Drummond (d. 1455), and wife Margaret Ruthven, daughter of Sir William Ruthven of that Ilk and wife, and great-grandson of Sir John Drummond of Cargill and Stobhall, 12th Thane of Lennox, Chief of Clan Drummond (b. Drymen, Stirlingshire, 1356, d. 1428), Justiciar of Scotia, and wife Elizabeth Sinclair (b. 1363), daughter of Henry Sinclair, 1st Earl of Orkney, and wife Jean Haliburton.

He sat in parliament 6 May 1471, under the designation of Lord of Stobhall. On 20 March 1473–4 he had a charter of the offices of seneschal and coroner of the earldom of Strathearn, in which he was confirmed in the succeeding reign. In 1483 he was one of the ambassadors to treat with the English King, with a safe-conduct (passport) granted 29 November of that year; again, on 6 August 1484, to treat of the marriage of James, Prince of Scotland, and Anne de la Pole, niece of Richard III. He was a commissioner for settling border differences nominated by the treaty of Nottingham, 22 September 1484; his safe-conduct into England being dated on the ensuing 29 November.

James III of Scotland took the office of Steward of Strathearn from Drummond in September 1475, making him his enemy. Although Drummond was raised to the peerage by the title of Lord Drummond, 29 January 1488, soon after he joined the rebel party against James III, and he sat in the first parliament of James IV, 6 October 1488.

In this same year he was appointed a privy councillor and justiciary of Scotland, and was afterwards constable of the castle of Stirling. In 1489 John Stewart, 1st Earl of Lennox, rose in revolt against the king. He had encamped at Gartalunane, on the south bank of the Forth, in the parish of Aberfoyle, but during the darkness of the night of 11 October was surprised and utterly routed by Drummond. As one of the commissioners to redress border and other grievances, Drummond had a safe-conduct into England 22 May 1495, 26 July 1511, 24 January 1513, and 20 April 1514.

== Assault on the Lyon Herald ==
In 1514 Drummond gave great offence to many of the lords by promoting the marriage of his grandson, Archibald Douglas, 6th Earl of Angus, with the queen-dowager Margaret. The Lord Lyon King of Arms (Sir William Cumming (or Comyn) of Inverallochy) was despatched to summon Angus before the council at Stirling Castle, when Drummond, thinking that he had approached the earl with more boldness than respect, struck him on the breast. In 1515 John Stewart, Duke of Albany, was chosen Regent of Scotland, but because Drummond did not favour the election he committed him (16 July) a close prisoner to Blackness Castle, upon an allegation that he had used violence towards the herald. He was tried capitally, found guilty, and his estates forfeited. However, he was not long in coming to terms with Albany. With other lords he signed the answer of refusal to Henry VIII, who had advised the removal of Albany, to which his seal is affixed, 4 July 1516, and in October he announced his final separation from the queen's party. He was in consequence released from prison and freed from his forfeiture, 22 November 1516.

== Family ==
He died at Drummond Castle, Strathearn, in 1519, and was buried in the church of Innerpeffray. He was succeeded by his great-grandson David. His wife was Elizabeth Lindsay, Lady Drummond, daughter of Alexander Lindsay, 4th Earl of Crawford, and by her he had four sons and six daughters. Malcolm, the eldest son, died young; David, master of Drummond, is not mentioned in the pedigrees, but is now believed to have been the chief actor in the Massacre of Monzievaird, when members of the Murrays of Ochtertyre were killed at Monzievaird Church, for which he was executed after 21 October 1490. William was living in March 1503; and John was ancestor of the Drummonds of Innerpeffray and of Riccarton.

Of the daughters, Margaret Drummond, mistress of James IV, died from food poisoning at Drummond Castle in 1501, Elizabeth Drummond married George Douglas, Master of Angus, and was great-grandmother of Henry Stuart, Lord Darnley, Beatrix never married; Annabella married William Graham, 1st Earl of Montrose; Eupheme, the wife of John Fleming, 4th Lord Fleming, died from food poisoning along with her sisters Sibylla and Margaret. Suggestions that the sisters were deliberately poisoned are treated with skepticism by serious historians, and there is no contemporary evidence to support this. The sisters were buried at Dunblane Cathedral.Drummond was the common ancestor of the viscounts of Strathallan and of the earls of Perth and Melfort.

Peerage of Scotland
| New creation | Lord Drummond; 1488–1519 | Succeeded by David Drummond |
