= Robert Lundie =

Robert Lundie or Lundy of Balgonie, (died 1500) was a Scottish knight, Master of the Royal Artillery, and Lord High Treasurer of Scotland.

== Royal service ==
Robert was a courtier of James IV of Scotland, and was bought expensive clothing for his role in 1494. He was First Usher of the Royal Chamber in 1495. In 1496, he was paid an £80 salary as chief of the King's Artillery.

Robert's family home was Balgonie Castle in Fife, which he had inherited from his mother's family. On 20 August 1496, the King passed by on his way to St Andrews and gave 18 shillings as a present to the stonemasons who were working on Balgonie.

Robert was also keeper of Dumbarton Castle until 26 July 1497, when he was succeeded in that responsibility by John Stirling of Craigbarnard. Robert's uncle was John Lundy of Lundy, who was keeper of Stirling Castle and, in 1496, the host of the King's mistress Margaret Drummond. John and Robert both employed the same servant in the King's affairs, Pat Gourlay. The master of the work at Stirling Castle at this time was Robert's chaplain, Thomas Smith. As well as supervising the construction of the "King's Old Building" for John Lundy, Thomas Smith also managed the construction of gun carriages for Robert's department.

Robert was appointed Lord High Treasurer of Scotland in May 1498, in charge of accounting for much of the royal receipts and expenditure of James IV. However, Robert died in 1500 and his accounts, which would otherwise be an important source for Scottish history, do not survive.

One of his duties was collecting treasure which had belonged to James III of Scotland who had been killed ten years before in 1488. Oliver Sinclair of Roslin was ordered to pay him 400 merks from 1,000 crowns worth of the late king's gold still in his keeping on 26 June 1498.
