= James Elphinstone, 1st Lord Balmerino =

Scottish noble and politician (1553?-1612)

James Elphinstone, 1st Lord Balmerino (1553?–1612) was a Scottish nobleman and politician, disgraced in 1609.

== Life to 1605 ==
He was the third son of Robert Elphinstone, 3rd Lord Elphinstone, by Margaret, daughter of Sir John Drummond of Innerpeffray, and was born about 1553. He was appointed a lord of session 4 March 1586. He was at this time known as "Master James Elphinstone of Innernochtie".

On 1 May 1590 he gave a speech in Latin in the King's Wark in Leith to welcome James VI of Scotland and his bride Anne of Denmark on their safe return from Denmark. In July 1593 he was appointed to a council to manage the estates and finances of Anne of Denmark.

In 1595, he was one of the commissioners of the treasury known as the Octavians. In 1598 he became secretary of state, and for the next five years was a member of commissions of the privy council. Elphinstone worked on the delicate issue of the Valentine Thomas affair, forging links with the English secretary Robert Cecil.

Elphinstone was a great favourite with James VI. At the Union of the Crowns in 1603, he accompanied James to London. On 20 February 1604, he was created a peer, with the title of Lord Balmerino, the estates of the Cistercian Abbey of Balmerino in Fife being converted into a lordship. In the same year he was nominated one of the Scottish commissioners to treat about the union with England. In March 1605 he was made Lord President of the Court of Session, and while holding that office successfully opposed George Home, 1st Earl of Dunbar. In September 1605 King James wrote to him to appoint a new gardener for the south yard of Holyrood Palace, especially as he planned to visit Scotland in 1606.

On 15 June 1608 Anne of Denmark wrote to him from Greenwich Palace to express her disappointment on the acquittal of Margaret Hartsyde, a servant who had stolen her jewels. The queen thought that Hartsyde would have been found guilty by Scottish law, which differs from English law. His brother Sir John Elphinstone was a gentleman in Anne of Denmarks's household.

Robert's eldest brother Alexander was Lord Elphinstone. Another brother John Elphinstone was a gentleman in the household of Anne of Denmark, whose duties included spending £4000 of the kings dowry on clothes and costumes for the women of the household at the baptism of Prince Henry in 1594.

== Disgrace ==
It was believed that James intended to appoint Balmerino secretary of state in England, but an end was put to his further promotion by his disgrace. In 1599 a letter signed by James had been sent to Pope Clement VIII, requesting him to give a cardinal's hat to William Chisholm, bishop of Vaison (a kinsman of Balmerino), and expressing high regard for the Pope and the Catholic faith. Patrick Gray, the Master of Gray, sent a copy of this letter to Elizabeth I, who asked James for an explanation. He asserted that the letter must be a forgery, and Balmerino, as secretary of state, also repudiated its authorship.

When in 1607 James published his Triplici nodo triplex cuneus in the allegiance oath controversy, Cardinal Bellarmine quoted at length the letter written in 1599 as a proof of James's former favour to Catholicism. James sent for Balmerino. The account he then gave was that he had written the letter, and had surreptitiously passed it in among papers awaiting the king's signature. He was accordingly put on his trial, when he refused to plead, but he acquitted the king of any knowledge of the letter written to the Pope, which he said had been sent by himself as a matter of policy.

The king confirmed the verdict of guilty which the jury found, and Balmerino was in March 1609 sentenced to be beheaded, quartered, and demeaned as a traitor. The sentence, however, was not carried out, due to the intercession of Anne of Denmark at the instance of Jean Drummond, her lady in waiting and Balmerino's relative.

According to a second account of Balmerino, James was not averse to correspondence with Pope Clement, but had scruples about addressing him by his apostolical titles, which were therefore afterwards prefixed by Balmerino to the letter which James, who was aware of its contents, had signed without hesitation. When the matter was brought up again in 1606, severe pressure was put by Dunbar and Robert Cecil, 1st Earl of Salisbury on Balmerino to induce him to take the whole blame on himself, and on the promise that his life and estates should be secured to him he consented to exculpate the king.

He remained imprisoned at Falkland till October 1609, when, on finding security in £40,000, he was allowed free ward in the town and a mile around. Afterwards he was permitted to retire to his own estate at Balmerino, where he died in July 1612.

== Family ==
He married, first, Sarah, daughter of Sir John Menteith, by whom he had one son, John, second lord Balmerino; secondly, Marjory, daughter of Hugh Maxwell of Tealing, by whom he had a son James, created in 1607 Lord Coupar, and two daughters, Anne and Mary.

Peerage of Scotland
New creation	Lord Balmerino; 1606–1612	Succeeded by John Elphinstone
