= Roderick MacLean (bishop) =

Scottish Catholic bishop (d. 1553)

- Bishop of the Isles
- Diocese: Diocese of Sodor
- In office: 5 March 1550 – 1553
- Predecessor: Ferchar MacEachan
- Successor: Alexander Gordon

Personal details
- Died: 1553
- Denomination: Roman Catholic

Roderick MacLean (Scottish Gaelic: Ruaidhri Mac Gill-Eathain; fl. 1549 - died 1553) was a 16th-century Scottish bishop of the Isles. He was appointed as bishop on 5 March 1550 and died in 1553.

In Rome, in 1549, he published a Latin translation of a large portion of Adomnan of Iona's 'Life of St Columba, which was a very obscure text at the time.

== Notes ==
Religious titles
Preceded by Ferchar MacEachan	Bishop of the Isles; 5 March 1550 – 1553	Succeeded by Alexander Gordon
