= Plean Castle =

Tower house in Scotland

Coordinates: 56.0617°N 3.8486°W

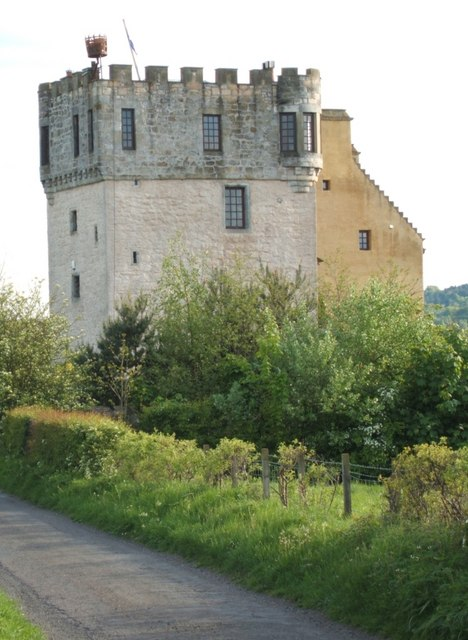
Plean Tower

Plean Tower, also known as Cock-a-bendy Castle, Mengie Castle, Menzies Castle and Plane Castle, is located around 1 mile (1.6 km) from Plean, in Stirling, central Scotland. It comprises a small oblong tower house probably dating from the 15th century, and an adjoining 16th-century manor house.

== History ==
Robert Bruce granted the barony of Plean, or Plane, to John d’Erth soon after 1314. The castle was probably built by Lord Somerville, who acquired the lands of Plean in 1449, through marriage.

An adjoining "manor house" was built in about 1528. In 1643 James Somervell of Plane sold the barony and lands to meet debts. It passed to the Nicholsons and the Elphinstones, but both the tower and the manor fell into disrepair. During the 1745 rebellion the Jacobite troops used the property.

Sir David Menzies restored the buildings in 1908, but by the 1930s they were again no longer in use. It was rebuilt from ruins by Nancy and John Patrick Wright and their sons in 1991–1997 to form a home and holiday accommodation.

== Structure ==
Plean Castle originally had three stories and a garret, with parapet corbelling. In its rebuilt 1990s form there is a "great hall" in the tower with painted ceiling beams and a large fireplace. The adjoining modern "manor house" is connected to the tower by a wooden walkway and is built over a vaulted basement surviving from the 1528 manor house. It is a category B listed building.

== See also ==
- Castles in Great Britain and Ireland
- List of castles in Scotland
