= Margaret Drummond (mistress) =

Scottish noblewoman and mistress of King James IV of Scotland

- Died: 1501; Drummond Castle
- Burial place: Dunblane Cathedral
- Partner(s): James IV (c. 1495–1501)
- Children: Margaret Stewart
- Father: John Drummond, 1st Lord Drummond

Margaret Drummond (died 1501) was a Scottish noblewoman, daughter of John Drummond, 1st Lord Drummond, and a mistress of King James IV.

She had a daughter, Lady Margaret Stewart. The death of Margaret Drummond has been the subject of a very persistent romantic legend.

== Relationship with the king ==
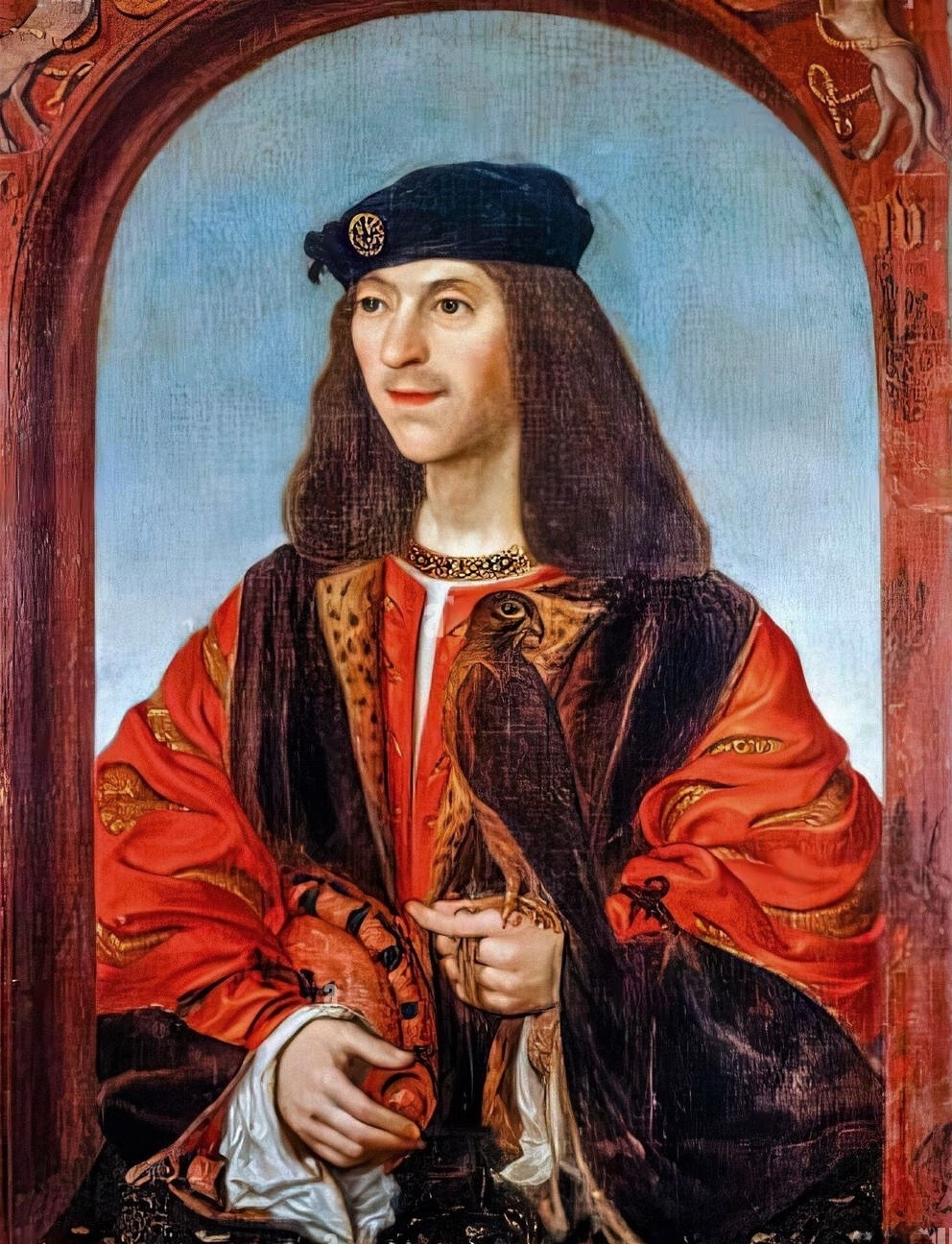
Margaret Drummond was a mistress of James IV

The duration of her relationship with the king has been much discussed. She was definitely the mistress of James IV during 1496–97, and possibly as early as 1495. Records show her living at Stirling Castle from 3 June 1496, and from 30 October to March 1497 at Linlithgow Palace. Her presence, and perhaps a previous similar arrangement for another mistress in the royal houses, was noted by the Spanish ambassador Pedro de Ayala. Ayala later wrote of James IV:

"When I arrived, he was keeping a lady with great state in a castle. He visited her from time to time. Afterwards he sent her to the house of her father, who is a knight, and married her [to a third party]. He did the same with another lady, by whom he had had a son."

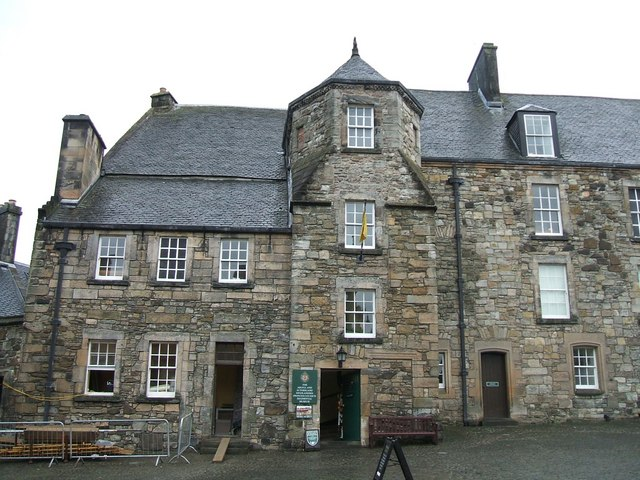
While Margaret Drummond stayed at Stirling Castle the Merlioun brothers were building the "King's House" at Stirling Castle

In the summer of 1496 Margaret Drummond was living at Stirling Castle, in the care of Elizabeth Forrester, Lady Lundie, the wife of Sir John Lundy of Lundie. His nephew Robert Lundie was the owner of Balgonie Castle and the keeper of Balgonie Castle. A new bed was bought for Margaret's chamber at Stirling on 3 June 1496. Lady Lundie managed Margaret's expenses. James IV played "tables", a form of backgammon, with Lady Lundie. Spices and confections sent to Stirling at this time were probably for her. At the time the castle was a building site where John and Walter Merlioun were working on a new lodging now called the "King's Old Building." Margaret moved to Linlithgow and the care of Sir David Kinghorn. New clothes were sent to her from Edinburgh. Margaret returned to Stirling, and Lady Lundie was given £10 Scots for keeping her for 11 days, and then she went home at the end of March 1497.

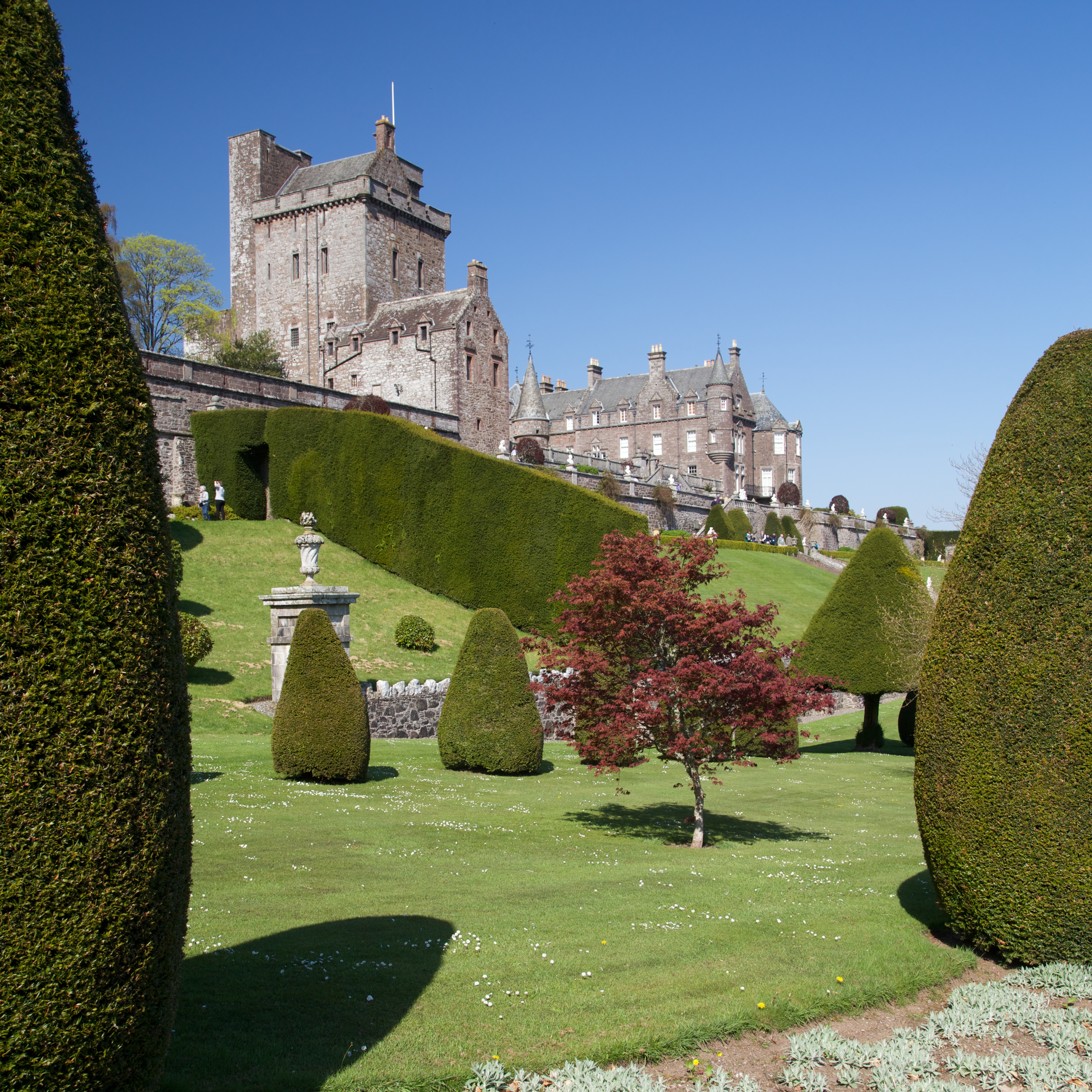
Margaret Drummond and her sisters Eupheme and Sibylla fell ill at Drummond Castle in 1501

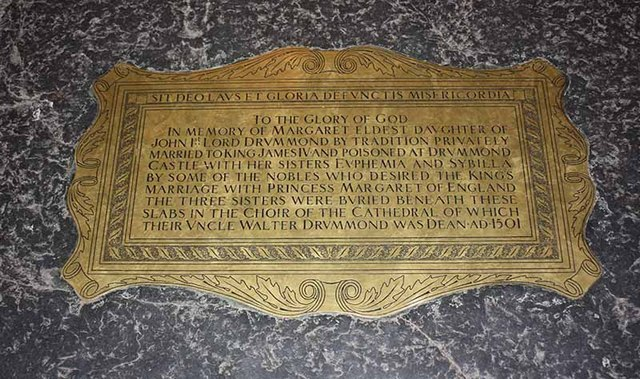
Brass plaque at Dunblane Cathedral commemorating Margaret Drummond and her sisters.

== Family ==
Margaret and James IV had a daughter, Margaret Stewart, known as "Lady Margaret". As a child she lived at Edinburgh Castle in the care of Sir Patrick Crichton and his wife, Katrine Turing, where one of her attendants was Ellen More.

In February 1505 she started dancing lessons with a drummer called Guilliam. There are records of her clothing, including, in June 1506; a gown of brown or russet cloth bordered with velvet, with velvet sleeves lined with taffeta, a satin kirtle or skirt, a hat and a tippet, a veil of "crisp", and ribbons for her hair.

She married firstly John Gordon, Lord Gordon, and secondly Sir John Drummond of Innerpeffray.

== Circumstances of death ==
In 1501, Margaret Drummond died of food poisoning, along with her sisters Eupheme and Sibylla, while staying at Drummond Castle. As a general rule, claims of poisoning made in relation to a historical figure who died after a sudden illness should be treated with caution, but in this case, with three people who presumably died shortly after eating the same meal, the contemporary judgment should be accepted. The three sisters are buried together in Dunblane Cathedral, their graves can still be seen in front of the altar. This did not cause a great deal of suspicion at the time; standards of food hygiene are unlikely to have been very good then, and cases of accidental food poisoning have happened in any period.

After her death the king paid for masses to be said for her soul, and continued to support their daughter.

== Murder theories ==
It has been suggested in that Margaret Drummond was murdered, either by English agents or by pro-English elements in the Scottish nobility. Many believe that James IV was planning to, or had already secretly married Drummond, and her death was necessary in order to allow or force the King to marry the English princess Margaret Tudor, daughter of Henry VII of England and Elizabeth of York. The (comparatively recent) plaque on her grave in Dunblane Cathedral claims that she was commonly believed to be "privately married" to the king, and that she was murdered by Scottish nobles who supported the English marriage.

Furthermore, the "Marriage of the Rose and Thistle", as the poet William Dunbar described it, brought about the Union of the Crowns exactly 100 years later, as it enabled their great-grandson James VI of Scotland to claim the English throne upon the death of Elizabeth I through his descent from Henry VII.

Had James IV married Margaret Drummond instead of Margaret Tudor, the Union of the Crowns might never have taken place and Scotland might have remained an independent country. This idea has been the theme of numerous historical novels and popular histories.

Serious historians are skeptical of the theory. It is not supported by the contemporary evidence, and is first recorded in the history of the Drummond family written by Viscount Strathallan in 1681. Her death was probably a case of accidental food poisoning, a common cause of death at that time. The king had a number of mistresses in his time, their relationship had ended a few years earlier, and may even have been shorter than those he had with either Marion Boyd or Janet Kennedy. The idea that James IV had to be pressured to marry Margaret Tudor is dubious. Scotland was the less important and poorer country, therefore peace was of vital importance to the Stewarts. Negotiations for the marriage had been taking place before Margaret Drummond died in 1501. Following the Cornish Rising in 1497, Henry VII had sought peace on the northern frontier by an alliance with James IV.

== See also ==
- Clan Drummond
- List of poisonings
