= Sir John Drummond 2nd of Innerpeffray =

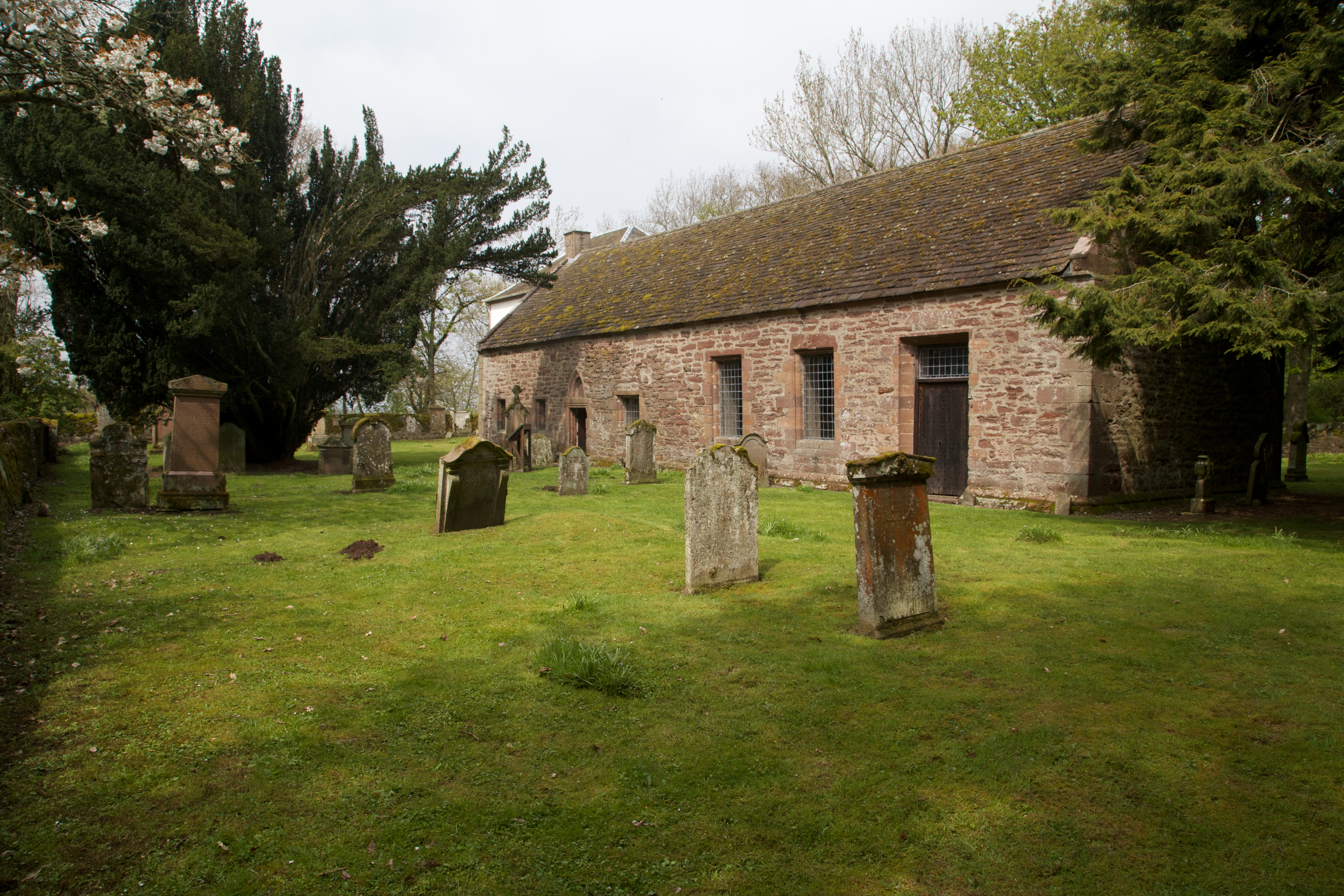
John Drummond was buried in the chapel his family built at Innerpeffray

Sir John Drummond 2nd of Innerpeffray (c. 1486 – 1560) was Forester of Strathearn, and tutor to David Lord Drummond during his minority, and lived at the Drummond residence at Innerpeffray.

John Drummond was son of Sir John Drummond 1st of Innerpeffray, called "John Bane", (pale John), and his cousin, a daughter of John Drummond of Coldoch. His sister Sibilla Drummond was a mistress of James V of Scotland. Their younger sister Isobella Drummond married the Gordon laird of Buckie.

He was on good terms with his stepsons, Alexander Gordon, who stayed at Innerpeffray in 1544 and 1548, and the Earl of Huntly. He was a supporter of the Catholic and French interest in Scotland. He attended the privy council meeting at St Andrews on 19 December 1546 where the siege of St Andrews Castle was debated.

On 16 May 1554, Robert Elphinstone, 3rd Lord Elphinstone put his affairs in the hands of his father-in-law Lord Erskine, John Drummond of Innerpeffray, and his brothers-in-law Robert Drummond of Carnock and John Hamilton of Haggs, because he had made poor decisions about his properties in his youth. This transaction was enacted before Mary of Guise and the Privy Council of Scotland in her presence chamber at Stirling Castle.

John Drummond died in February 1560 and was buried in the chapel his family built at Innerpeffray.

== Family ==
In 1531 John Drummond was married to Margaret Stewart, Lady Gordon (born c. 1497), who was his niece via his sister, and the widow of John Gordon, Lord Gordon, and an illegitimate daughter of James IV of Scotland and Margaret Drummond. Margaret Stewart had been brought up at Edinburgh Castle and her household included two African servants. Following their marriage, James V of Scotland made John Drummond Forester of the Royal Forest of Glenartney in Strathearn.

They had five daughters.

- Margaret, married Robert Elphinstone, 3rd Lord Elphinstone.
- Jean. married James Chisholm, 3rd of Cromlix.
- Elizabeth,
- Agnes, married firstly Hugh Campbell of Loudoun, secondly, Hugh Montgomerie, 3rd Earl of Eglinton, thirdly, Patrick Drummond, 3rd Lord Drummond.
- Isobel, married Matthew Campbell of Loudon. Their daughter Jean Campbell married Ludovic Stewart, 2nd Duke of Lennox at Sorn in September 1598. Another daughter, Margaret Campbell, married Thomas Boyd, 6th Lord Boyd.

A group of nine carved oak panels, which include John Drummond and Margaret Stewart's heraldry are held and displayed by the National Museums of Scotland. Six of the panels may have originated in a residence in Edinburgh. The ruined castle at Innerpeffray is thought to have been built by a later generation of the family.
