= Elphinstone Tower, Falkirk =

Tower house in Falkirk, Scotland

Coordinates: 56.0803°N 3.7850°W

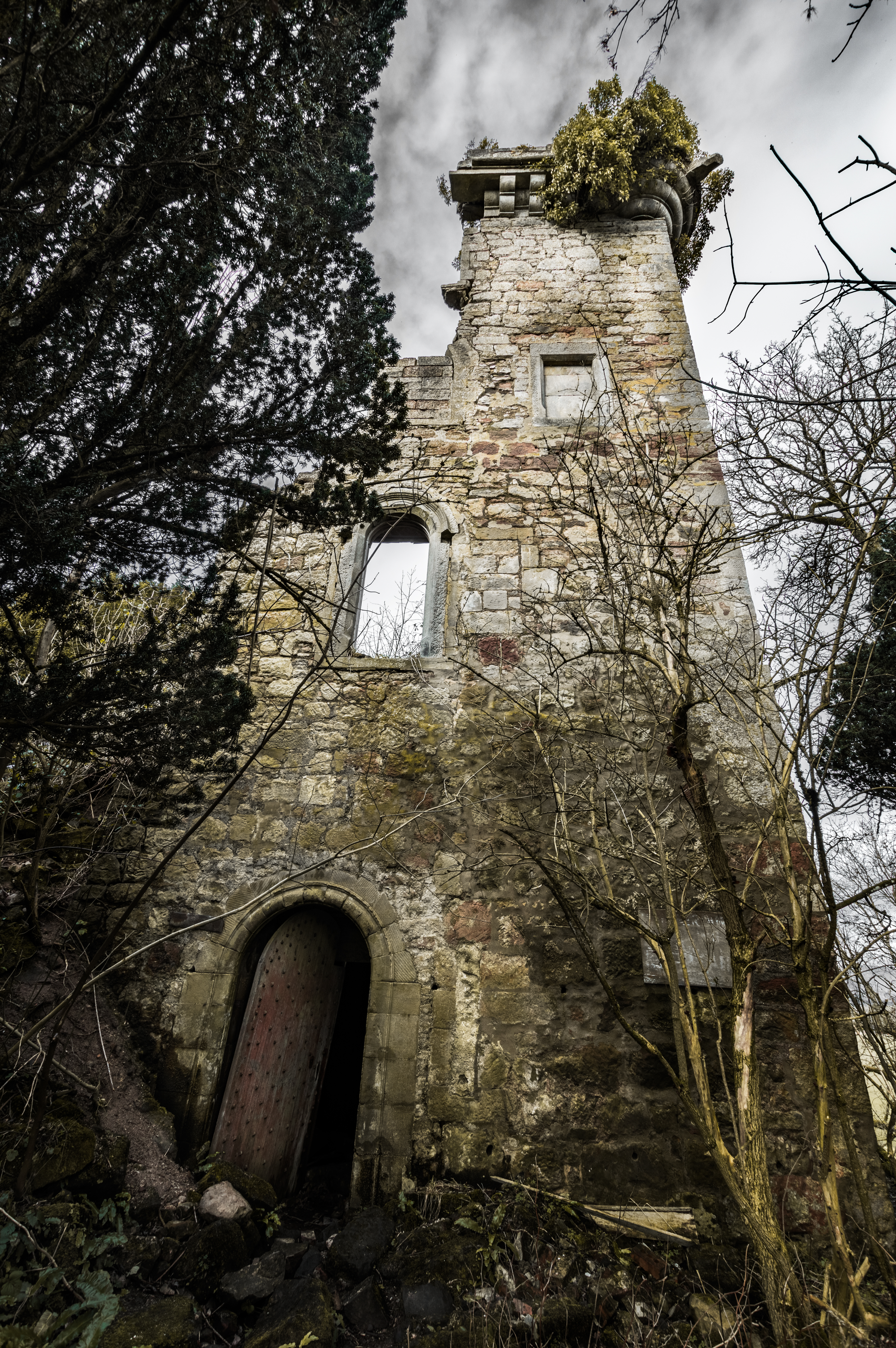
Ruins of Elphinstone Tower in 2016

Elphinstone Tower, also known as Dunmore Tower or Airth Tower, is a ruined tower house on the Dunmore Estate in central Scotland. It is located 1.5 kilometres (0.93 mi) north-west of Airth and 9 kilometres (5.6 mi) east of Stirling in the Falkirk council area. The 16th-century ruin is protected as a category C(S) listed building.

== History ==
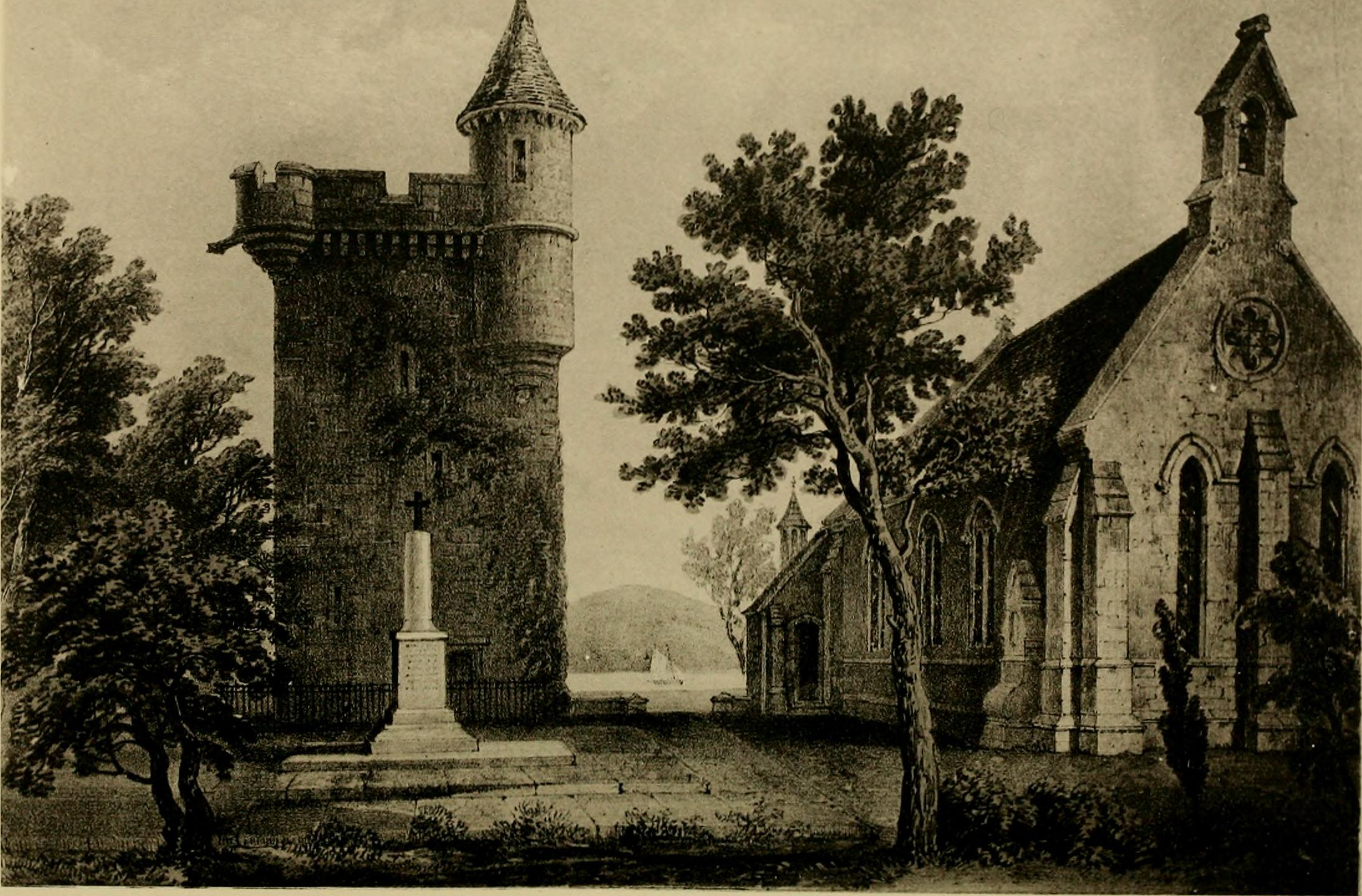
Drawing of the tower and Elphinstone church, 1897

The tower dates to the early 16th century, when it was built by Sir John Elphinstone as the seat of the barony of Elphinstone. Alexander Elphinstone, 4th Lord Elphinstone added a gallery and a new hall before his death in 1638.

The Elphinstone Estate was purchased for £16,000 by John Murray, son of the 3rd Earl of Dunmore, in 1754. Two years later he inherited the earldom, and renamed the estate Dunmore after his title. Lord Dunmore built the famous Dunmore Pineapple elsewhere on the estate in 1761. The tower was extended at some point, although there is little evidence that it was occupied. In the 1820s the 5th Earl commissioned the building of Dunmore Park as the principal residence on the estate. The additions to the tower were demolished to allow construction of St Andrew's Episcopal Church, a private chapel completed around 1850. The tower was subsequently restored and the ground floor remodelled as a family burial vault.

The Murray family left Dunmore in 1911, and the tower has since decayed. St Andrew's Church was demolished in the early 1960s, and the north-west angle of the tower collapsed after a storm around 1968. The tower stands 9 by 7.4 metres (30 by 24 ft), and the walls are 17 metres (56 ft) high to the parapet.

== See also ==
- Dunmore, Falkirk, estate village
