= Lord Balmerino =

Title in the Peerage of Scotland (1606-1746)

The title of Lord Balmerino (or Balmerinoch) was a title in the Peerage of Scotland; it was created in 1606 and forfeited in 1746 on the attainder and execution of the 6th Lord Balmerino in the Tower of London.

The title of Lord Coupar or Cupar was a title in the Peerage of Scotland; it was created on 20 December 1607 for James Elphinstone, second son of the 1st Lord Balmerino. The 3rd Lord Balmerino succeeded his uncle in the lordship of Coupar in 1669. From his succession to the lordship of Coupar in 1669 to the attainder and forfeiture in 1746, both lordships were merged.

== Lords Balmerino (1606) ==
- Sir James Elphinstone, 1st Lord Balmerino (d. 21 June 1612)
- John Elphinstone, 2nd Lord Balmerino (d. 28 February 1649)
- John Elphinstone, 3rd Lord Balmerino (18 February 1632 – 10 June 1704)
- John Elphinstone, 4th Lord Balmerino (26 December 1652 – 13 May 1736)
- James Elphinstone, 5th Lord Balmerino (24 November 1675 – 5 January 1746)
- Arthur Elphinstone, 6th Lord Balmerino (1688 – 18 August 1746) (forfeit 1746)

The family owned estates in north Fife centred on the village of Balmerino and in 1609 were granted land and buildings in and around Leith forfeited by Robert Logan of Restalrig, also assuming the role of feudal superior of the area in place of Logan. This included a large mansion off the Kirkgate in Leith thereafter known as Balmerino House.

== Lords Coupar (1607) ==
- James Elphinstone, 1st Lord Coupar (c. 1590–1669)
- John Elphinstone, 3rd Lord Balmerino, 2nd Lord Coupar (see above, also for further lords)
