= Sir Alexander Gilmour, 1st Baronet =

Scottish politician (1657-1731)

Sir Alexander Gilmour, 1st Baronet (1657-1731) of Craigmillar Castle, Edinburgh, was a Scottish politician who sat in the Parliament of Scotland from 1690 to 1702.

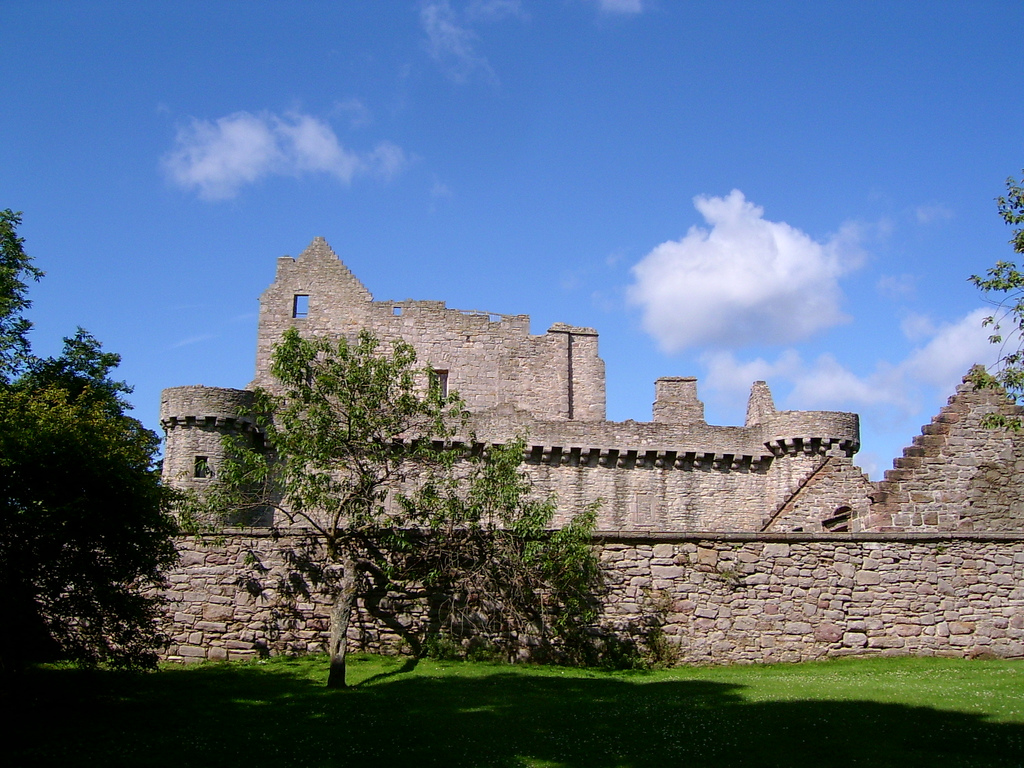
Craigmillar Castle, Edinburgh

Gilmour was baptized at Edinburgh on 6 December 1657, the son of Sir John Gilmour, of Craigmillar, sometime Lord President of the Court of Session, and his third wife Margaret Murray, daughter of Sir Alexander Murray, 2nd Baronet of Blackbarony. He was served heir to his father on 26 September 1671. On 1 February 1678, he was created baronet. He married Grisel Ross, daughter of George Ross, 11th Lord Ross and his first wife Grisel Cochrane, daughter of William Cochrane, 1st Earl of Dundonald.

Gilmour was returned as Shire Commissioner for Edinburghshire in 1690 and held the seat until 1702.

Gilmour died on 29 October 1731 aged 74, and was succeeded in the baronetcy by his son Charles.

Parliament of Scotland
Preceded by Sir James Foulis; Sir John Maitland	Member of Parliament for Edinburghshire; 1690–1702; With: Sir James Foulis; Sir John Maitland; Robert Craig; Archibald Primrose; Robert Dundas; Sir John Clerk	Succeeded by Robert Dundas; Sir James Primrose; Sir Robert Dickson; George Lockhart
Baronetage of Nova Scotia
New creation	Baronet (of Craigmillar); 1678-1731	Succeeded by Charles Gilmour
