= Archibald Primrose, 1st Earl of Rosebery =

Scottish politician (1664–1723)

The Right Honourable The Earl of Rosebery PC

Member of Parliament for Edinburghshire
- In office 1695–1700 Serving with Robert Craig, Sir Alexander Gilmour, Sir John Clerk
- Preceded by: Sir James Foulis; Sir John Maitland; Sir Alexander Gilmour; Sir John Clerk
- Succeeded by: Robert Craig; Robert Dundas; Sir Alexander Gilmour; Sir John Clerk

Personal details
- Born: Archibald Primrose; 18 December 1664
- Died: 20 October 1723 (aged 58)
- Spouse: Dorothea Cressy (after 1690)
- Parent(s): Sir Archibald Primrose, Lord Carrington; Agnes Gray

Archibald Primrose, 1st Earl of Rosebery PC (18 December 1664 – 20 October 1723) was a Scottish politician.

== Early life ==
Primrose was born on 18 December 1664. He was the son of Sir Archibald Primrose, Lord Carrington (1616–1679), and Agnes Gray (d. 1699). His mother, the daughter of Sir William Gray of Pittendrum, was the widow of Sir James Dundas of Newliston. His father, the son of James Primrose and Catherine Lawson, was the widower of Elizabeth Keith (daughter of Sir James Keith of Benholme). From his parents marriage, his sister was Grizel Primrose (wife of Francis Sempill, 8th Lord Sempill, and Brig.-Gen. Richard Cunningham). From his father's first marriage, he had a number of half-siblings, including Sir James Primrose, Maj.-Gen. Gilbert Primrose, Sir William Primrose, 2nd Baronet, Catherine Primrose (wife of Sir David Carnegie, 1st Baronet), and Margaret Primrose (wife of Sir John Foulis, 1st Baronet).

== Career ==
Primrose was a Commissioner to the Parliament of Scotland for Edinburgh county from 1695 until his elevation to the peerage of Scotland in 1700. He also served as Chamberlain of Fife and Strathearn between 1703 and 1714.

He was Gentleman of the Bedchamber to Prince George of Denmark (husband of the future Queen Anne). He was created Viscount Rosebery (in the Peerage of Scotland) in 1700, with special remainder to heirs male of his body, in default of which, to heirs female of his body, and then to heirs of entail in the lands of Rosebery. He was created Earl of Rosebery on the accession of Queen Anne in 1703. He was a Commissioner for union with England and was a Scottish representative peer in 1707, 1708, 1710 and 1713.

== Personal life ==
On 3 February c. 1690, Primrose and Dorothea Cressy obtained a marriage license. Together, they were the parents of:

- James Primrose, 2nd Earl of Rosebery (c. 1690–1755), who married Mary Campbell, a daughter of Hon. John Campbell (a son of the 9th Earl of Argyll and Lady Mary Stuart, a daughter of the 4th Earl of Moray) and Elizabeth Elphinstone (a daughter of the 8th Lord Elphinstone).
- Lady Mary Primrose (d. 1746), who married Sir Archibald Primrose, 2nd Baronet, son of George Primrose of Ravelstoun, in 1724. (Note: Sir Archibald Primrose, 2nd Baronet was the son of George Primrose of Ravelstoun (born George Foulis), and grandson of Sir John Foulis, 1st Baronet (who married the 1st Earl's elder half-sister, Margaret Primrose, Lady Foulis.)
- Lady Margaret Primrose (d. 1785), who married Alexander Sinclair, 9th Earl of Caithness, son of John Sinclair, 8th Earl of Caithness, in c. 1737.
- Lady Dorothea Primrose, lived at the head of Blackfriars Wynd on the Royal Mile in Edinburgh to care for her aunt Primrose Campbell, Lady Lovat (the Earl's sister) the widow of the executed Lord Lovat.

Lord Rosebery died on 20 October 1723.

=== Descendants ===
Through his son James, he was a grandfather of Neil Primrose, 3rd Earl of Rosebery, who married heiress Susan Ward (a daughter of Sir Edward Ward, 5th Baronet), and Mary Vincent (daughter of Sir Francis Vincent, 7th Baronet).

Through his daughter Margaret, Countess of Caithness, he was a grandfather of Lady Dorothea Sinclair, who married James Duff, 2nd Earl Fife.

Parliament of Scotland
Preceded by Sir James Foulis; Sir John Maitland; Sir Alexander Gilmour; Sir John Clerk	Member of Parliament for Edinburghshire; 1695–1702; With: Robert Craig; Sir Alexander Gilmour; Sir John Clerk	Succeeded by Robert Craig; Robert Dundas; Sir Alexander Gilmour; Sir John Clerk Robert Dundas
Peerage of Scotland
New creation	Earl of Rosebery; 1703–1723	Succeeded by James Primrose
New creation	Viscount of Rosebery; 1700–1723	Succeeded by James Primrose
