= James Foulis (disambiguation) =

James Foulis (1871–1928) was a Scottish-American golfer who won the second U.S. Open in 1896.

James Foulis may also refer to:

- Jim Foulis (1903–1969), American golfer, nephew of the 1896 U.S. Open winner
- James Foulis (judge) (died 1549), Scottish judge
- Sir James Foulis, 2nd Baronet (died 1688), Scottish judge
- Sir James Foulis, 3rd Baronet (1645–1711), Scottish judge
- Sir James Foulis, 4th Baronet (died 1742), of the Foulis baronets
- Sir James Foulis, 5th Baronet (1714–1791), antiquarian
- Sir James Foulis, 6th Baronet (died 1825), of the Foulis baronets
- Sir James Foulis, 7th Baronet (1770–1842)
