= George Lockhart (politician) =

Scottish writer and Jacobite politician

Sir George Lockhart
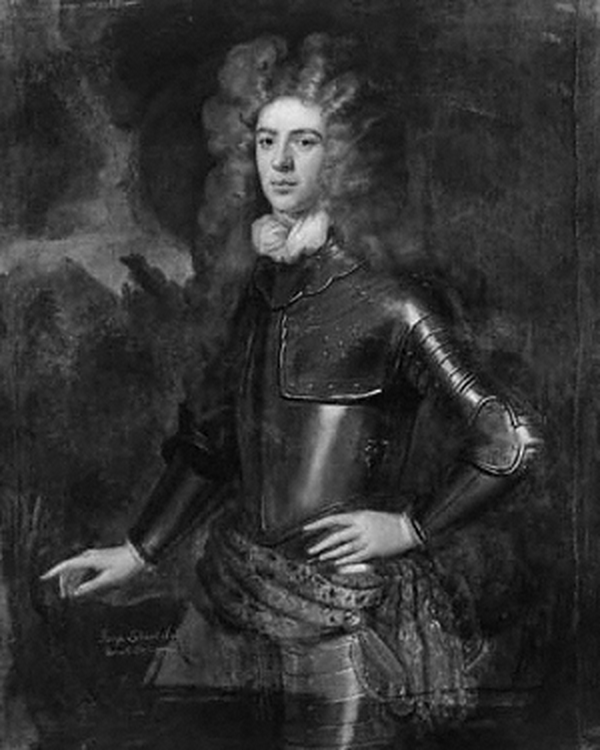
- Portrait by Sir John Baptiste de Medina

Member of Parliament for Midlothian
- In office 1708–1715
- Preceded by: New constituency
- Succeeded by: John Baird

Member of Parliament for Wigtown Burghs
- In office 1708–1708
- Preceded by: New constituency
- Succeeded by: William Cochrane

Commissioner for Edinburghshire
- In office 12 November 1702 – 25 March 1707
- Succeeded by: Constituency abolished

Personal details
- Born: 1673
- Died: 17 December 1731 (aged 58)
- Party: Tory
- Other political affiliations: Squadrone Volante
- Profession: Politician

Sir George Lockhart of Lee (1673 – 17 December 1731), of Carnwath, South Lanarkshire, also known as Lockhart of Carnwath, was a Scottish writer and Jacobite politician who sat in the Parliament of Scotland from 1702 to 1707 and as a Tory in the House of Commons from 1708 to 1715. He was a member of the Commission on the Union before 1707 but acted as an informant to his Jacobite colleagues and later wrote an anonymous memoir of its dealings. He supported the Stuart cause in the Jacobite rising of 1715.

== Early life ==
Coat of arms Lockhart of Carnwath: Argent a man’s heart proper within a fetterlock sable, on a chief azure three boar’s heads erased of the first, all within a bordure of the fourth charged with five mullets of the field.

Lockhart was the son of Sir George Lockhart of Carnwath and his second wife Philadelphia Wharton, daughter of Philip Wharton, 4th Baron Wharton and sister of Thomas Wharton, 1st Marquess of Wharton, one of the leaders of the Whig Junta. After his father’s death, Lockhart succeeded to a sizable estate at the age of eight years. His Whiggish guardians removed his tutor, John Gillane, the family’s episcopalian chaplain. His education was placed in the hands of Presbyterian tutors who also tutored John Campbell, 2nd Duke of Argyll. Lockhart and Argyll became friends as children, and remained friends into adulthood despite political differences. Campbell became one of Scotland's leading Whigs, while Lockhart came to have a profound dislike of Presbyterianism. By 1695 he had obtained the appointment of episcopalian guardians and had begun to manage his own financial affairs. He developed the estate and exploited the coal reserves to become one of the wealthiest of Scottish commoners, and gathered a major electoral interest in Lanarkshire and Midlothian. He married Lady Euphemia Montgomerie (d. 1738), daughter of a leading Episcopalian peer Alexander Montgomerie, 9th Earl of Eglinton on 30 April 1697.

== The Parliament of Scotland and the Treaty of Union ==
In 1702, Lockhart became shire commissioner for the shire of Edinburgh in the Parliament of Scotland. He joined the cavalier wing of the Country party. He was made a privy councillor in 1703 as part of the Court’s attempt to woo the cavaliers. He was attracted to a political alliance in the hope of achieving legal toleration for Episcopalians but as this was not forthcoming, he went into opposition, and remained disaffected with the Court for the rest of his time in the Scottish parliament. He denounced the defection from the Country party of the so-called ‘New Party’ (later Squadrone) in 1704. He had a close connection with the Duke of Hamilton, although he was frustrated at the Duke’s unwillingness to pursue Jacobite objectives. After he voted for Hamilton’s motion for deferring a decision on the succession, he was removed from the privy council in December 1704. In 1705, to his annoyance, he was appointed a commissioner for arranging the union with England apparently through the influence of Wharton. Initially he decided not to accept the post, but was persuaded by Jacobite colleagues that it would be useful for him to report back to them on the proceedings. He avoided signing the treaty, and in Parliament became one of the most vigorous opponents of the Union. Although he had some support for the article on communication of trade, he usually voted with the opposition, and abstained from voting on ratification.

== British parliament and attempt to repeal the Union ==
After the union Lockhart decided to seek election to Westminster to serve the Jacobite cause, and to distract the ministry from suspicion about the intended invasion. He gave his interest in Lanarkshire to Lord Archibald Hamilton and was returned as Member of Parliament for Edinburgh. He was also returned for Wigtown burghs where he stood as an insurance. In 1713 he took part in an abortive movement aiming at the repeal of the union. He was deeply implicated in the rising of 1715, the preparations for which he assisted at Carnwath and at Dryden, his Edinburgh residence. He was imprisoned in Edinburgh Castle but, probably through the favour of John Campbell, 2nd Duke of Argyll, he was released without being brought to trial; but his brother, Philip, was taken prisoner at the Battle of Preston and condemned to be shot, the sentence being executed on 2 December 1715. Lockhart continued to act on behalf of James III; his letters were intercepted by the government in 1727 but he was warned of his imminent arrest by Charles Erskine, a senior government legal officer, and managed to escape to the Continent.

== Death ==
Argyll's influence was again exerted in Lockhart's behalf, and in 1728 he was permitted to return to Scotland, where he lived in retirement until his death in a duel on 17 December 1731.

== Writings ==
The "Lockhart Papers" are a significant authority for the history of the Jacobites. Lockhart was the author of Memoirs of the Affairs of Scotland, dealing with the reign of Queen Anne up to the union with England, first published in 1714. These Memoirs, together with Lockhart's correspondence with the Pretender, and some other papers of minor importance, were published again in the two volumes of Lockhart Letters (1817), edited by Anthony Aufrère.

Lockhart was the source of intelligence revealing the extensive bribery of Scottish parliamentarians prior to the Treaty of Union, giving rise to the famous Robert Burns line: "bought and sold for English gold". He published a list of bribes paid by the English Treasury.

== Family ==
Lockhart belonged to the Lockharts of Lee, who were active in Scots law and politics during the 17th century. He married Eupheme Montgomerie, daughter of Alexander Montgomerie, 9th Earl of Eglinton, by whom he had a large family.

He had two sons one being Alexander Lockhart, Lord Covington, and the older, more reclusive brother, Henry Lockhart (1690-1787), who had one son with his wife, Mary Lockhart (1692-1780)

His daughter, Grace Lockhart, married John Gordon, 3rd Earl of Aboyne and, after his death, James Stuart, 8th Earl of Moray.

== See also ==
- Treaty of Union 1707
- List of people killed in duels

Parliament of Scotland
Preceded by Robert Craig of Riccarton; Sir Alexander Gilmour; Sir John Clerk	Shire Commissioner for Edinburghshire; 1702–1707; With: Robert Dundas; Sir James Primrose; Sir Robert Dickson; Sir James Foulis	Succeeded by Parliament of Great Britain
Parliament of Great Britain
New constituency	Member of Parliament for Midlothian; 1708 – 1715	Succeeded by John Baird
New constituency	Member of Parliament for Wigtown Burghs; 1708	Succeeded by William Cochrane
