= Treaty of Union =

Agreement that led to the creation of the new state of Great Britain

An Act for an Union of the Two Kingdoms of England and Scotland
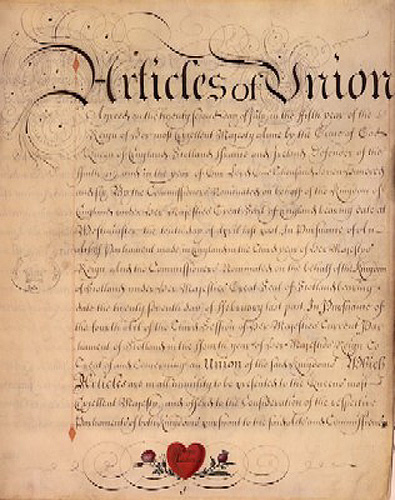
- Articles of Union, 1707
- Type: Union Treaty
- Context: Political union between the Kingdoms of Scotland and England to form one state known as the Kingdom of Great Britain
- Drafted: 22 April–25 April 1706 (Note: These dates are according to the Julian calendar. According to the Gregorian calendar, it was 3 May–6 May 1706.)
- Signed: July 22, 1706 (Note: This date is according to the Julian calendar. According to the Gregorian calendar, the date was 2 August 1706.)
- Location: Parliament House, Edinburgh, Scotland; Palace of Westminster, London, England
- Effective: 1 May 1707 (Note: This date is according to the Julian calendar. According to the Gregorian calendar, the date was 12 May 1707.)
- Negotiators: Kingdom of Scotland; Kingdom of England
- Signatories: Parliament of Scotland; Parliament of England

The Treaty of Union is the name usually now given to the treaty (Note: The Treaty of Union's status as a treaty has been disputed. See the Status section of this article for more information.) which led to the creation of the new political state of Great Britain. The treaty, effective since 1707, brought the Kingdom of England (which already included Wales) and the Kingdom of Scotland together to be "United into One Kingdom by the Name of Great Britain". At the time it was more often referred to as the Articles of Union.

The Treaty details were agreed on 22 July 1706, and separate Acts of Union were then passed by the parliaments of England and Scotland to put the agreed Articles into effect. The Treaty of Union was eventually passed in the Parliament of Scotland. The first Parliament of Scotland was a unicameral Parliament that was first mentioned on record in the 13th century, when a meeting took place in Kirkliston in 1235. The Parliament met until "prorogued sine die" following months of intense debate, with 110 voting in favour for the treaty to 67 against. It is notable that 123 of the 300 members of Parliament were missing from one of the most controversial votes of the age. The passing of the vote has been described as a vote "to end Scotland's independence".

The political union took effect on 1st May 1707, when the Lord Chancellor of Scotland James Ogilvy, 4th Earl of Findlater, prorogued (to discontinue a session of a parliament without dissolving it) sine die (Latin for “without day”; something done sine die has no definite date to resume) the Parliament of Scotland with the words "there’s ane end of ane auld sang" whilst the church bells of St Giles' Cathedral played the tune Why should I feel so sad on my wedding day?

== Background ==
=== Union of the Crowns (1603) ===
Queen Elizabeth I of England and Ireland, last monarch of the Tudor dynasty, died without issue on 24 March 1603, and the throne fell at once (and uncontroversially) to her first cousin twice removed, James VI of Scotland, a member of the House of Stuart and the only son of Mary, Queen of Scots. By the Union of the Crowns in 1603 he assumed the throne of the Kingdom of England and the Kingdom of Ireland as King James I. This personal union lessened the constant English fears of Scottish cooperation with France in a feared French invasion of England. After this personal union, the new monarch, James I and VI, sought to unite the Kingdom of Scotland and the Kingdom of England into a state which he referred to as "Great Britain". Nevertheless, the Acts of Parliament attempted to unite the two countries. James I and VI died in 1625 and was succeeded by his second son Charles I.

After his accession in 1625, Charles quarrelled with the English Parliament, which sought to curb his royal prerogative. He believed in the divine right of kings and was determined to govern according to his own conscience. From 1642, Charles fought the armies of the English and Scottish parliaments in the English Civil War. After his defeat in 1645 at the hands of the Parliamentarian New Model Army, he fled north from his base at Oxford. Charles surrendered to a Scottish force. Charles was tried, convicted, and executed for high treason in January 1649. The monarchy was abolished and the Commonwealth of England was established as a republic. The monarchy was restored in 1660, with Charles's son Charles II as king.

Charles's English Parliament enacted the Clarendon Code, to shore up the position of the re-established Church of England. Charles acquiesced to these new laws even though he favoured a policy of religious tolerance. Nevertheless, Charles dissolved the English Parliament in 1681 and ruled alone until his death in 1685 and was succeeded by his brother and heir apparent James II and VII. James II like his brother attempted to fight for divine right of king. His attempts to impose Catholic Religion by absolutist decrees as a matter of his perceived divine right were met with opposition from Parliament of England and Parliament of Scotland which lead to his deposal in the 1688 Glorious Revolution. He was succeeded by King William III and II and Queen Mary II who ruled as co monarchs until the death of Queen Mary II in 1694.

The 1688 Glorious Revolution angered many in Scotland with many seeing the new monarchs William III and Mary II as inheriting the Scots throne without consent, which led to groups in the Highlands of Scotland organising resistance and later forming the Jacobite movement. In 1696 the Jacobites plotted unsuccessfully to assassinate William and restore James to the throne. William's lack of children and the death in 1700 of his nephew the Duke of Gloucester threatened the Protestant succession. The danger was averted by placing William and Mary's cousins, the Protestant House of Hanover, in line to the throne after Mary's sister Anne with the Act of Settlement 1701. Upon his death in 1702, William was succeeded by Anne in the Kingdom of England and the Kingdom of Scotland, and by his cousin John William Friso as titular Prince of Orange.

=== Trading ===
Beginning in 1698, the Company of Scotland sponsored the Darien scheme, an ill-fated attempt to establish a Scottish trading colony in the Isthmus of Panama, collecting from Scots investments equal to one-quarter of all the money circulating in Scotland at the time. In the face of opposition by English commercial interests, the Company of Scotland also raised subscriptions in Amsterdam, Hamburg, and London for its scheme. For his part, King William III of England and II of Scotland had given only lukewarm support to the Scottish colonial endeavour. England was at war with France, and hence did not want to offend Spain, which claimed the territory as part of New Granada.

England was also under pressure from the London-based East India Company, which was anxious to maintain its monopoly over English foreign trade. It therefore forced the English and Dutch investors to withdraw. Next, the East India Company threatened legal action, on the grounds that the Scots had no authority from the king to raise funds outside the king's realm, and obliged the promoters to refund subscriptions to the Hamburg investors. This left no source of finance but Scotland itself. The colonisation ended in a military confrontation with the Spanish in 1700, but most colonists died of tropical diseases. This was an economic disaster for the Scottish ruling class investors and diminished the resistance of the Scottish political establishment to the idea of political union with England. It ultimately supported the union, despite some popular opposition and anti-union riots in Edinburgh, Glasgow, and elsewhere.

=== Political integration ===
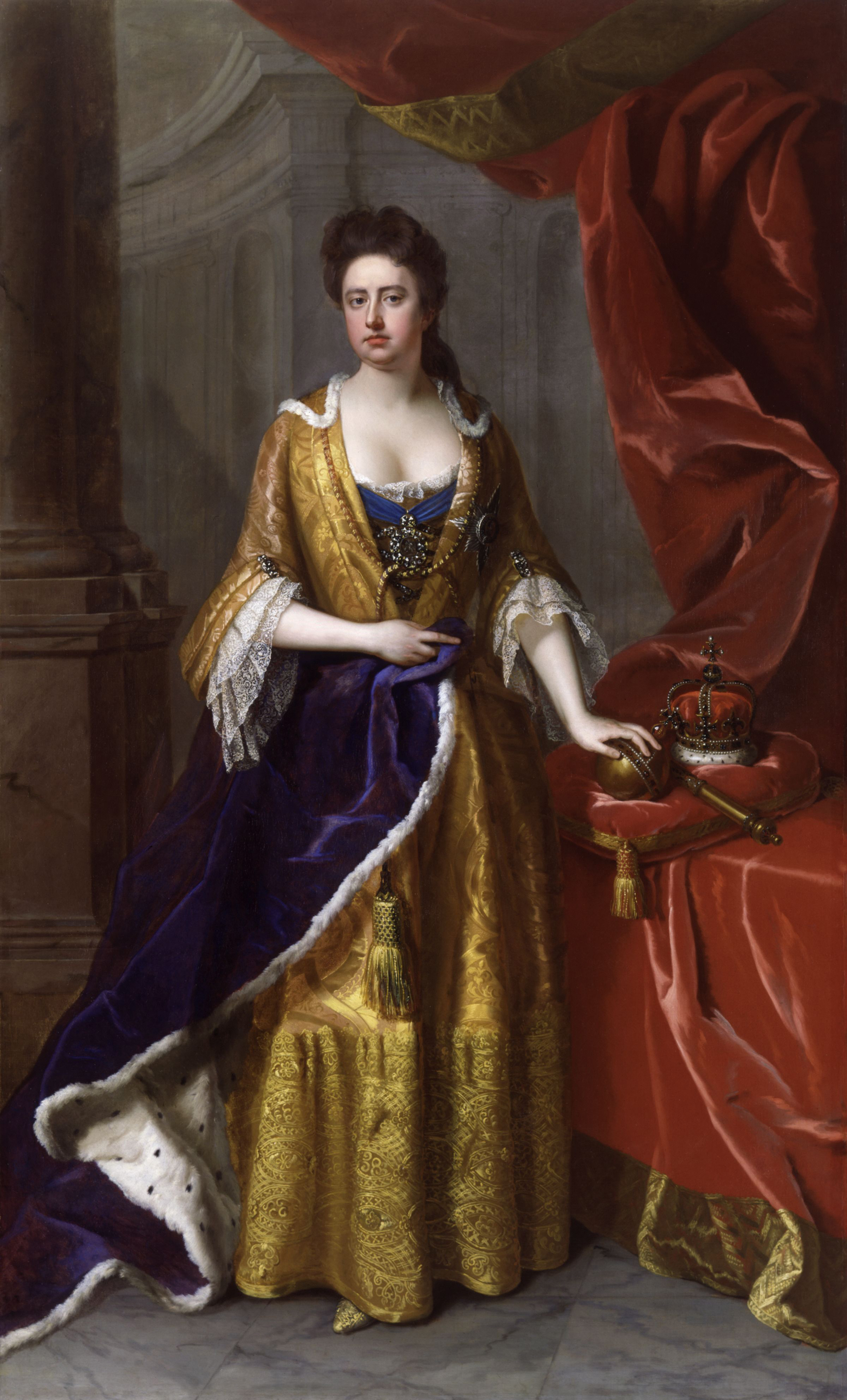
Queen Anne sought enhanced levels of political integration between the Kingdoms of England and Scotland.

Deeper political integration had been a key policy of Queen Anne ever since she had acceded to the thrones of England, Scotland, and Ireland in 1702. Following Anne's succession to the throne, the Parliament of Scotland passed the Act of Security 1704 which stipulated that the Parliament of Scotland had the right to select Anne's successor as monarch, and that Scotland would only agree with an English decision for her successor if Scotland were to be granted full access to English trading markets, from which it had been excluded. Scotland's declaration sparked uncertainty in England, since there was fear that Scotland would end the composite monarchy, the Union of Crowns, return the House of Stuart to the throne, and re–establish the "Auld Alliance" with the Catholic Kingdom of France. England feared for the vulnerability of its northern border if the Auld Alliance were to be re–established.

Under the aegis of the queen and her ministers in both kingdoms, in 1705 the parliaments of England and Scotland agreed to participate in fresh negotiations for a treaty of union.

=== Treaty negotiations ===
It was agreed that Anne as Queen of England and Scots would appoint thirty-one Royal commissioners from each nation to conduct the negotiations. The Parliament of Scotland then began to arrange an election of the commissioners to negotiate on behalf of Scotland, but in September 1705, the leader of the Country Party, the Duke of Hamilton, who had previously attempted to obstruct the negotiation of a treaty, proposed that the Scottish commissioners should be nominated by the Queen, and this was agreed. In practice, the Scottish commissioners were nominated on the advice of the Duke of Queensberry and the Duke of Argyll.

Of the Scots commissioners who were subsequently appointed, twenty-nine were members of the governing Court Party, while one was a member of the Squadron Volante. At the head of the list was Queensberry himself, with the Lord Chancellor of Scotland, the Earl of Seafield. George Lockhart of Carnwath, a member of the opposition Cavalier Party, was the only commissioner opposed to union. The thirty-one English commissioners included government ministers and officers of state, such as the Lord High Treasurer, the Earl of Godolphin, the Lord Keeper, Lord Cowper, and a large number of Whigs who supported union. Most Tories in the Parliament of England were not in favour of a union, and only one was among the commissioners.

Negotiations between the English and Scots commissioners began on 16 April 1706 at the Cockpit-in-Court in London. The sessions opened with speeches from William Cowper, the English Lord Keeper, and from Lord Seafield, the Scottish Lord Chancellor, each describing the significance of the task. The commissioners did not carry out their negotiations face to face, but in separate rooms. They communicated their proposals and counter-proposals to each other in writing, and there was a blackout on news from the negotiations. Each side had its own particular concerns. Within a few days, England gained a guarantee that the Hanoverian dynasty would succeed Queen Anne to the Scots crown, and Scotland received a guarantee of access to colonial markets, in the hope that they would be placed on an equal footing in terms of trade.

=== Finalising negotiations ===
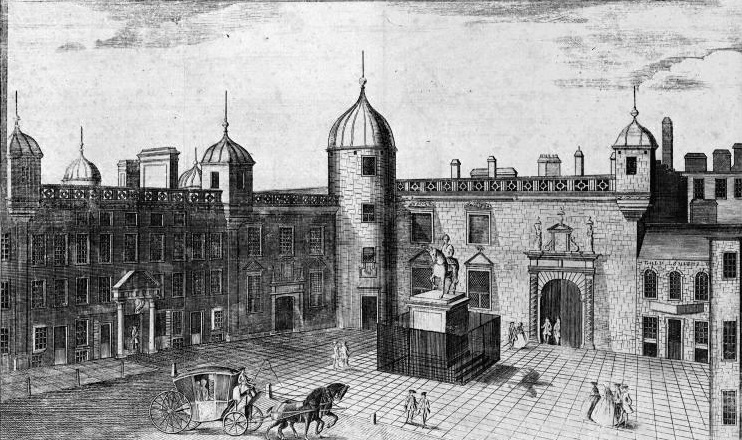
Parliament House, the seat of the Government of Scotland, was the site for a number of protests against the treaty.

After the negotiations ended on 22 July 1706, separate acts of parliament were drafted by both parliaments to implement the agreed Articles of Union. The Scots proponents of union believed that failure to agree to the Articles would result in the imposition of a union under less favourable terms, and English troops were stationed just south of the Scottish border and also in northern Ireland as an "encouragement". Months of fierce debate in both capital cities and throughout both kingdoms followed. In Scotland, the debate on occasion dissolved into civil disorder, most notably involving the notorious "Edinburgh Mob", which threatened "Destruction to all the Promoters of the Union".

As the Parliament of Scotland was deliberating on 22 October 1706, the session had to be suspended "because the mob was threatening to break in"; although this did not ultimately occur, they subsequently "attacked the house of Sir Patrick Johnston, a commissioner for union and former Lord Provost of Edinburgh." "Troops were brought into the city with orders to shoot if necessary, and several regiments were placed at Queensberry's disposal on the Scottish border and in Ireland in the event of trouble." The prospect of a union of the kingdoms was deeply unpopular among the Scottish population at large, and talk of an uprising was widespread. However, the treaty was signed and the documents were rushed south with a large military escort. Andrew Fletcher, a prominent Scottish patriot, argued that the ratification of the treaty would see Scotland "more like a conquered province".

== Implementation ==
=== Kingdom of Great Britain ===
The Flag of Great Britain (1707–1800) incorporated the Flag of England and Flag of Scotland.

The Kingdom of Great Britain was established on 1 May 1707, shortly after the parliaments of Scotland and England had ratified the Treaty of Union by each approving Acts of Union combining the two parliaments and the powers of the two crowns. Scotland's crown, sceptre, and sword of state remained at Edinburgh Castle. Queen Anne (already Queen of both England and Scotland) formally became the first occupant of the unified throne of Great Britain, with Scotland sending forty-five members to the new House of Commons of Great Britain, as well as Scottish representative peers to the House of Lords, with no comparable reduction to the number of English representatives.

Significant financial payoffs to Scottish parliamentarians were later referred to by Robert Burns when he wrote "We're bought and sold for English gold, Such a Parcel of Rogues in a Nation!" Some recent historians, however, have emphasized the legitimacy of the vote.

=== Public opinion ===
==== Scotland ====
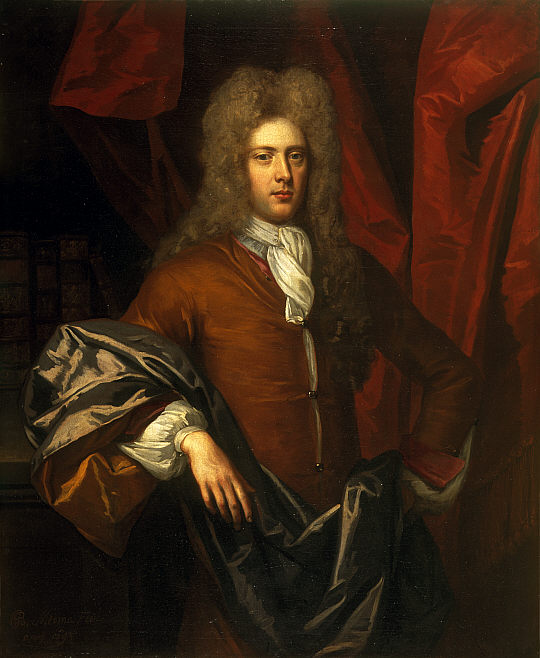
James Ogilvy, former Lord Chancellor (1702–1708), initially supported union but by 1713 advocated for its reversal.

Even before the ratification of the treaty, there were feelings of unrest and discontent in Scotland over the proposed union with England, with many in Scotland viewing England as their long–standing enemy. As the details of the treaty began to become known in Scotland, official addresses and outcry began in Scotland with such official addresses being read at the commencement of each session of the Parliament of Scotland, however, had little effect and parliamentary business continued as normal. Many Scots were angered at the apparent ignorance towards Scotland's military engagement with England in order to maintain its independence and status as an "admirably ancient and unconquered kingdom". Opponents to the treaty with England argued that Commissioners of the Parliament of Scotland who were negotiating the terms of treaty should respect Scotland's independence and military campaigns to protect it, and reject the treaty.

Many travelled to Parliament House, Edinburgh, the seat of the Parliament of Scotland, to hear the terms of the Treaty of Union, and on 23 October 1706, riots erupted in response to the proposal for higher English customs and excise rates to be imposed on Scotland following the ratification of the treaty. Subsequent riots occurred in Glasgow, and between November and December 1706, crowds gathered in both Dumfries and Stirling to publicly burn copies of the proposed treaty. The Presbyterians who organised the burning of the treaty in Dumfries published a manifesto outlining opposition to a union with England. Over 20,000 Scots signed petitions against the treaty, and though it had little implications, it did lead to increased tensions in Edinburgh. Those opposing the treaty in the Parliament of Scotland hoped that it would encourage the Government of Scotland to abandon negotiations with Kingdom of England for a political union.

Additionally, many in Scotland feared how Scottish interests, economy, trade and business could be promoted in a parliament which would have an overwhelming majority of MPs representing England. There was also a feeling amongst Scots that English interference in the Company of Scotland lead to the failure of the Darien Scheme, Scotland's attempt to establish a colony. A number of producers and consumers in Scotland were fearful of the economic consequences in Scotland as a result of a union with the Kingdom of England, fearing lack of competition with cheaper English imports and pressure on the Scottish economy as a result of higher levels of English customs and excise rates.

By 1713, the former Lord Chancellor of Scotland, James Ogilvy, 4th Earl of Findlater, who was a prominent supporter for the Treaty of Union between Scotland and England had changed his position on the treaty, and unsuccessfully advocated for the treaty to be reversed.

==== England ====
Little is known about the public view in the Kingdom of England either for or against a union with the Kingdom of Scotland, however, it has been speculated that the proposed union was viewed more favourably in England than in Scotland.

It is speculated, however, that the Kingdom of England secured what they had sought from the treaty – a security and guarantee that the House of Hanover dynasty would succeed Queen Anne to the Scottish crown following her reign.

== Status ==
The status of the Treaty or Articles of Union as an international treaty is challenged by T. B. Smith. He argued that the Treaty is better described as a 'record of negotiations' between commissioners and that the Acts of Union 1707 constitute the actual treaty. The Scottish parliamentary debate subsequently amended the document when producing their Act of Union, which can itself be described as an offer of treaty terms.

Smith argues further that this debate is redundant because the obligants under the treaty 'disappeared in 1707' and replaced by a new state, which was not party to a treaty, or combined into a successor state to the Kingdom of England. A treaty requires at least two parties, so it ceased to exist with the Kingdom of Scotland.

This position is rejected by David Walker, who argues that its treaty status is 'amply evidenced' by previous legislation, that the Articles and other legislation refer to it as a "treaty" although in the same article he does agree with Smith that the Kingdom of Scotland ceased to exist after the Acts of Union "ratified by the parliaments of the two uniting states under their domestic laws, so as to put themselves out of existence and create a new sovereign state in lieu".

== The Articles of Union ==
The Treaty consisted of twenty-five Articles.

- Article 1 provided that the kingdoms of Scotland and England would, from 1 May 1707, be united into one kingdom named Great Britain, with its own royal coat of arms and a flag combining the crosses of St Andrew and St George.
- Article 2 provided for the succession of the House of Hanover to the throne of Great Britain, and for a Protestant succession, as set out in the English Act of Settlement of 1701.
- Article 3 provided for the creation of one unified Parliament of Great Britain.
- Article 4 gave the subjects of Great Britain freedom of trade and navigation within the kingdom and the "Dominions and Plantations thereunto belonging".
- Articles 5 to 15, 17, and 18 dealt with a register of British trading ships, customs and duties on import and export, weights and measures, movement, taxes, regulation of trade, and other matters, to ensure equal treatment for all subjects of the new kingdom.
- Article 16 required the introduction of a common currency for Great Britain, subsequently effected through the Scottish recoinage of 1707–1710, and the continuation of a Scottish Mint.
- Article 19 provided for the continuation of the Court of Session, the High Court of Justiciary, and the separate Scottish legal system.
- Article 20 provided for the protection after the union of a number of heritable offices, superiorities, heritable jurisdictions, offices for life, and jurisdictions for life.
- Article 21 provided for the protection of the rights of the royal burghs.
- Article 22 provided for Scotland to be represented in the new Parliament of Great Britain by sixteen Scottish representative peers and forty-five members of the House of Commons.
- Article 23 provided for Scotland's peers to have the same rights as English peers in any trial of peers.
- Article 24 provided for the creation of a new Great Seal of Great Britain, different from those of England and Scotland, but it also provided that the Great Seal of England was to be used until this had been created; a Great Seal of Scotland for use in Scotland; and that the Honours of Scotland, the Records of the Parliament of Scotland and all other records, rolls and registers be kept and remain in Scotland.
- Article 25 provided that all laws of either kingdom that may be inconsistent with the Articles in the Treaty were declared void.

== Commissioners ==
The following commissioners were appointed to negotiate the Treaty of Union:

Kingdom of England

- William Cowper, 1st Baron Cowper, Lord Keeper of the Great Seal
- Sidney Godolphin, 1st Earl of Godolphin, Lord High Treasurer
- Thomas Herbert, 8th Earl of Pembroke, Lord President of the Council
- John Holles, 1st Duke of Newcastle, Lord Privy Seal
- Henry Boyle, Chancellor of the Exchequer
- Sir Charles Hedges, Secretary of State for the Southern Department
- Robert Harley, Secretary of State for the Northern Department
- Charles Paulet, 2nd Duke of Bolton
- Thomas Tenison, Archbishop of Canterbury
- Charles Howard, 3rd Earl of Carlisle
- Sir John Cooke, Advocate-General
- John Manners, Marquess of Granby
- Sir Simon Harcourt, Solicitor General
- Charles Montagu, 1st Baron Halifax
- William Cavendish, Marquess of Hartington
- Sir John Holt, Lord Chief Justice
- Evelyn Pierrepont, 5th Earl of Kingston-upon-Hull
- Sir Edward Northey, Attorney General
- Ralph Grey, 4th Baron Grey of Werke
- Edward Russell, 1st Earl of Orford
- Lord William Powlett, Member of Parliament for Winchester
- John Smith, Speaker of the House of Commons
- John Somers, 1st Baron Somers
- Charles Seymour, 6th Duke of Somerset
- Charles Spencer, 3rd Earl of Sunderland
- Charles Townshend, 2nd Viscount Townshend
- Sir Thomas Trevor, Chief Justice of the Common Pleas
- Dr. Stephen Waller, Doctor of Law
- Thomas Wharton, 5th Baron Wharton
- Charles Powlett, Marquess of Winchester
- John Sharp, Archbishop of York

Kingdom of Scotland

- James Ogilvy, 1st Earl of Seafield, Lord Chancellor
- James Douglas, 2nd Duke of Queensberry, Lord Privy Seal
- John Erskine, Earl of Mar, Secretary of State
- Hugh Campbell, 3rd Earl of Loudoun, Secretary of State
- David Boyle, 1st Earl of Glasgow, Treasurer-depute
- Lord Archibald Campbell
- Daniel Campbell of Shawfield, Commissioner for Inveraray
- John Clerk of Penicuik, Commissioner for Whithorn
- Adam Cockburn, Lord Ormiston, Lord Justice Clerk
- Sir David Dalrymple of Hailes, 1st Baronet, Commissioner for Culross
- Hew Dalrymple, Lord North Berwick, Lord President of the Court of Session and Commissioner for North Berwick
- Robert Dundas, Lord Arniston, Commissioner for Edinburghshire
- Thomas Hay, Viscount Dupplin
- Alexander Grant of that Ilk, Commissioner for Inverness-shire
- Sir Patrick Johnston, Commissioner for Edinburgh
- David Melville, 3rd Earl of Leven
- George Lockhart of Carnwath, Commissioner for Lanarkshire
- Francis Montgomerie of Giffen, Commissioner for the Treasury and Commissioner for Ayrshire
- Hugh Montgomerie of Busbie, Commissioner for Glasgow
- William Morrison of Prestongrange, Commissioner for Peeblesshire
- James Douglas, 11th Earl of Morton
- Sir Alexander Ogilvy of Forglen, 1st Baronet, Commissioner for Banff
- Archibald Primrose, 1st Earl of Rosebery
- William Ross, 12th Lord Ross, Commissioner for the Treasury
- William Seton of Pittmedden, Commissioner for Aberdeenshire
- Sir James Smollett of Stainflett and Bonhill, Commissioner for Dumbarton
- John Dalrymple, 1st Earl of Stair
- Dougald Stewart of Blairhill, Commissioner for Rothesay
- Robert Stewart of Tillicoultry, Commissioner for Bute
- John Gordon, 16th Earl of Sutherland
- David Wemyss, 4th Earl of Wemyss
