= David Home of Crossrig =

Scottish judge and diarist

Sir David Home
- Lord Crossrig
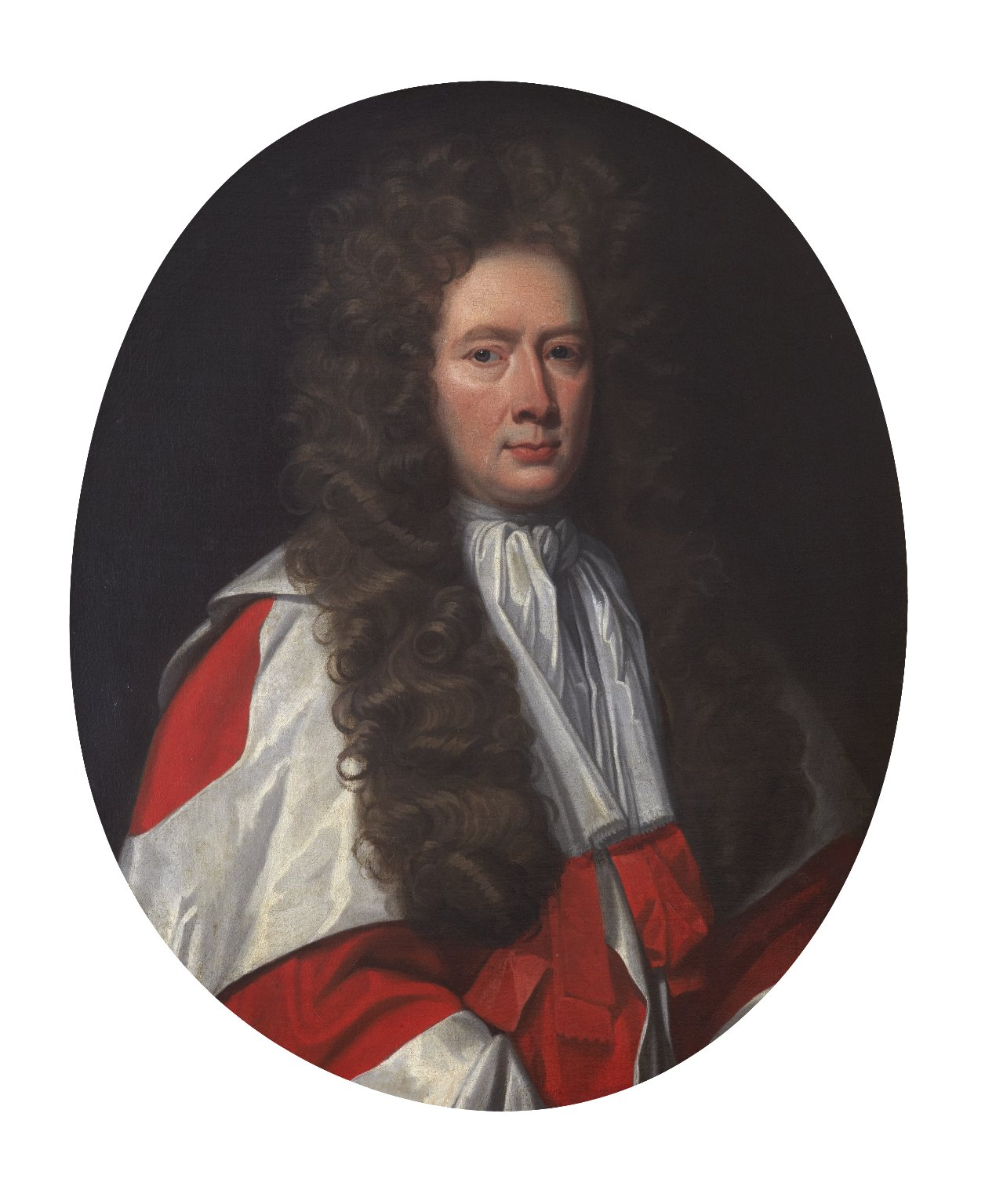
- Oval half length portrait. Sir David wears a heavy brown wig and is robed in a gown of scarlet and white with a white cravat at his neck. There is a similar picture in Parliament House.
- Born: 23 May 1643
- Died: 13 April 1707 (aged 63–4)
- Spouses: Barbara Weir (m. ?; died ?); Unknown (m. ?)
- Issue: 4 (2 daughters by first wife, 2 sons by second)
- Father: Sir James Home
- Mother: Mary Dundas

Sir David Hume or Home, of Crossrig, Lord Crossrig (1643–1707) was a Scottish judge and diarist.

== Biography ==
=== Early life ===
David Hume, second son of Sir James Hume or Home of Blackadder, Berwickshire, created a baronet of Nova Scotia in 1674, by his wife Mary, daughter of Sir James Dundas of Arniston, was born 23 May 1643. He entered the University of Edinburgh in 1657, but having, in accordance with a custom kept up by the students in opposition to the regulations of the university, gone on 11 March of the following year to a football match on the Borough Muir, and having declined to submit to the consequent punishment of whipping in the class, he was expelled from the university. Through the interposition of his relative Sir David Dundas he was again admitted in November 1659, and graduated MA in 1662. After travelling in France in the autumn of 1664 he settled in Paris, where he studied law till the outbreak of hostilities with England compelled him to leave in April 1666. Abandoning his intention of adopting the legal profession, he entered into the wine trade in 1672, and was for a year (1673) also partner in a brewery. On 13 April 1681 he met with an accident which necessitated the amputation of one of his legs. His sympathies being with the Presbyterian party, he was at the time of Argyll's expedition in 1685 arrested on suspicion, but soon after the collapse of the enterprise he was set at liberty.

=== Public office ===
On 3 June 1687 Hume was admitted advocate upon his petition without trial of his qualifications. He represented that he had studied law abroad in company with Lord Reidford, one of the Lords of Session, Sir Patrick Home, and Sir John Lauder, who were prepared "to give testimony regarding his diligence and proficiency in that study". He ingenuously admits in his Domestic Details that his reason for petitioning to be admitted in this fashion was that he considered himself "so rusted in the study of law" that he could not venture to undergo the ordinary examination. (Note: Domestic Details, p. 43.) Home was among the first judges nominated by King William after the revolution, and one of the four appointed by the Privy Council in October 1689 "to give his attendance for passing bills of suspension and all other bills according to the common form". He took his seat on the bench by the title of Lord Crossrig, on 1 November 1689; on 22 January of the following year was appointed a Lord of the Justiciary, and was shortly afterwards knighted. On 5 January 1700, when the great fire in the meat market, Edinburgh, broke out in the middle of the night in the lodging immediately below his house, he and his family barely escaped with their lives. Duncan Forbes of Culloden in a letter to his father mentions, "among many rueful sights" that were witnessed that night, "Corserig naked with a child under his oxter happing for his lyffe". (Note: Culloden Papers, p. 27.) In November following he presented to Parliament a petition in reference to the loss of his papers in the fire. His petition was remitted to a committee of three, and on their recommendation an act was passed, 31 January 1701, entitled An act for proving the tenor of some writs in favour of Sir David Home of Crossrig. The writs had reference chiefly to the inheritance of his lands of Crossrig.

=== Death and legacy ===
Hume died 13 April 1707. In an elegy printed shortly after his death, and republished in Maidment's Scottish Elegiac Verses, 1843, he is called:

Most zealous for the church, kind to the poor,

Upright in judgment, in decisions sure.

He was the author of a small posthumous volume entitled Advice to a Daughter, Edinburgh, 1771, originally written by him as a letter to his daughter in April 1701. His Diary of the Proceedings in the Parliament and Privy Council of Scotland 21 May 1700–7 March 1707, printed for the Bannatyne Club in 1828, is of considerable interest and value as a record of the deliberations connected with the passing of the Acts of Union. The Domestic Details of Sir David Hume of Crossrig, one of the Senators of the College of Justice, 20 April 1697–29 Jan. 1707, published at Edinburgh in 1843, gives an account of the main circumstances of his life, with incidental references to the customs of bygone times. A portrait of Hume by young Medina, son of Sir John Medina, was at one time in the possession of C. Kirkpatrick Sharpe.

=== Family ===
Hume was twice married, first to Barbara Weir, relict of William Laurie of Reidcastle, and secondly to the widow of James Smith, merchant, and a granddaughter, not a daughter as sometimes stated, of Sir Alexander Swinton of Swinton. By his first wife he had two daughters, and by his second two sons.

== Sources ==
- Domestic Details of Sir David Hume of Crossrig, 1843;
- Brunton and Haig's Senators of the College of Justice.
