= William Foulis =

William Foulis may refer to:

- Sir William Foulis, 4th Baronet (1659–1741), of the Foulis baronets
- Sir William Foulis, 5th Baronet (c. 1680–1756), of the Foulis baronets
- Sir William Foulis, 6th Baronet (1729–1780), of the Foulis baronets
- Sir William Foulis, 7th Baronet (1759–1802), of the Foulis baronets
- Sir William Foulis, 8th Baronet (1790–1845), of the Foulis baronets
- Sir William Liston-Foulis, 8th Baronet (1812–1858), of the Foulis baronets
- Sir William Liston-Foulis, 10th Baronet (1869–1918), of the Foulis baronets

== See also ==
- William Munro, 12th Baron of Foulis (died 1505), Scottish Knight and Scottish clan chief of the highland Clan Munro
- Foulis (surname)
- William Foulis (Keeper of the Privy Seal), a 15th-century Scottish political figure
