= Adam Hepburn, Lord Humbie =

Scottish politician

Adam Hepburn, Lord Humbie MP (c.1600–1656) was a 17th-century Scottish judge, politician, soldier and Senator of the College of Justice. A strong Royalist during the English Civil War, he was acquainted by both Charles I and Charles II.

== Life ==
He was the only child of Rev Adam Hepburn (died 1602), minister of Stobo Kirk, and his wife, Agnes Foulis of Colinton. On the death of his father he inherited the estate of Humbie south-west of Haddington. Given his young age this would have been placed in trust until he reached the age of majority (then 21). There are seven mansion houses in the parish of Humbie but it is presumed his house was Humbie House, east of the village.

He trained as a lawyer and in June 1640 was appointed clerk to the Committee of Estates.

In November 1641 he was elected a Senator of the College of Justice under the title of Lord Humbie.

He was knighted by King Charles I of England in 1641 and served as MP for Haddington in 1643. In the same year (during the English Civil War) in August, he was appointed Collector General and Treasurer of the British Army (for the King). In 1646/47 he served as Colonel in Chief of the East Lothian Infantry under General Leslie in the Covenanter's Army.

Following the Civil War, at the Restoration, Hepburn was on the committee organising the Scottish coronation of Charles II on the Stone of Destiny at Scone Palace in 1650. In 1651 he was created a Burgess of Dundee with several other prominent figures (as a political gesture).

He was captured with his son and others, by Cromwell's troops under Col. Aldriche, two months later at Alyth and spent some years as a prisoner in the Tower of London. He was released and permitted to return to Scotland around 1655.

Adam Hepburn died in June 1656.

== Family ==
He married his cousin, and mother's namesake, Agnes Foulis, in December 1629. They had at least 13 children.

His eldest daughter Janet Hepburn married Sir James Dundas, Lord Arniston.

His son Thomas (1631-1668) married Elizabeth Johnston, the daughter of Archibald Johnston, Lord Warriston.
