= Patrick Grant, Lord Elchies =

Scottish judge

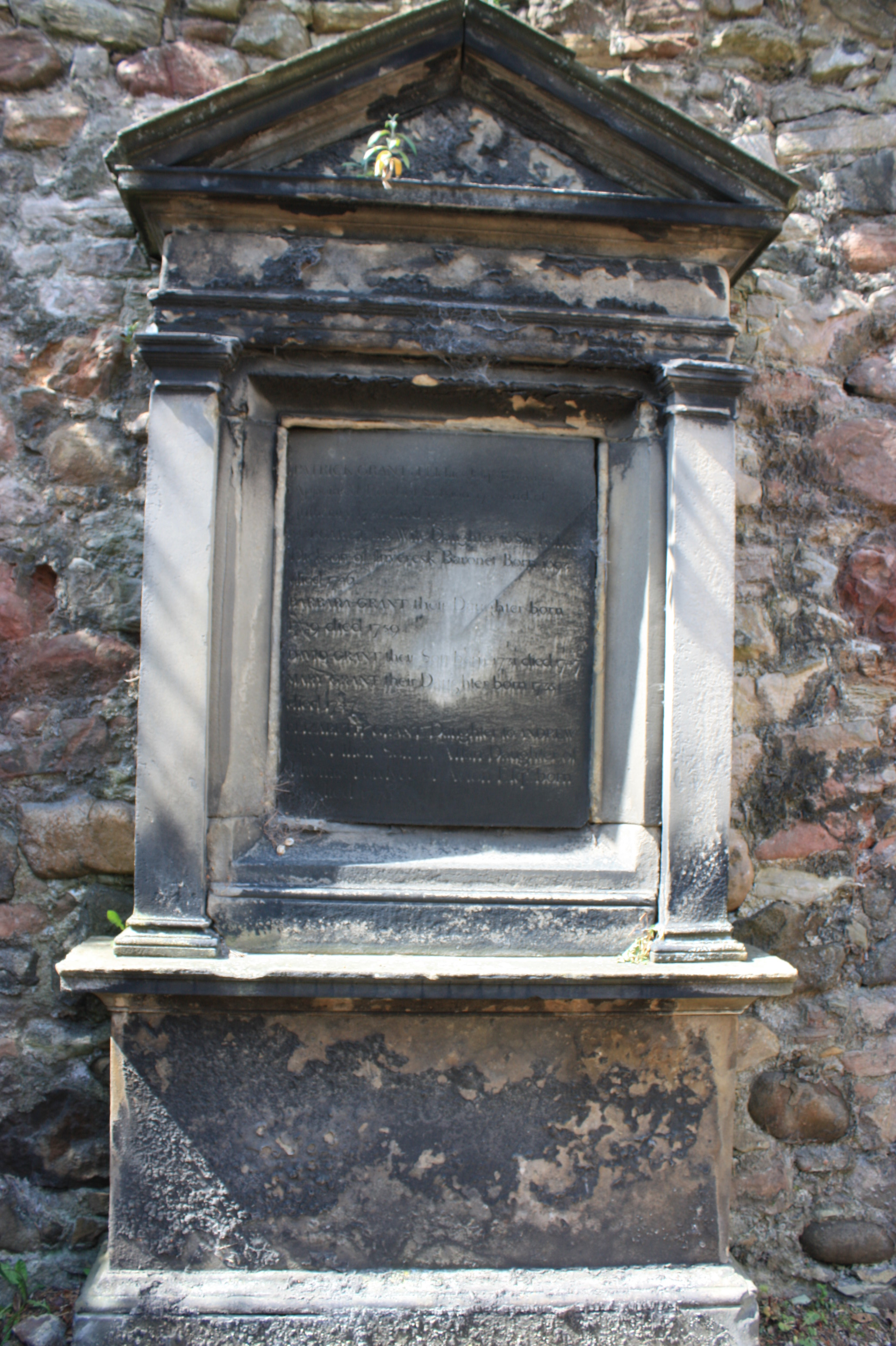
The grave of Lord Patrick Grant, Greyfriars Kirkyard

Patrick Grant, Lord Elchies, Sixth of Easter Elchies (1691–1754) was a Scottish judge, rising to the level of Lord of Session and Senator of the College of Justice.

== Life ==
Grant was the son of Captain Grant of Easter Elchies.

He studied law at the University of Edinburgh and was admitted as an advocate on 12 February 1712, and obtained a good practice. On 3 November 1732 he was raised to the bench with the title of Lord Elchies, in succession to Sir John Maxwell of Pollock; on 3 March 1737 he succeeded Walter Pringle, Lord Newhall as a lord of justiciary.

He died at his home, Inch House, on the southern edge of Edinburgh, on 27 July 1754.

He is buried in the sealed south-west section of Greyfriars Kirkyard in Edinburgh, in the area known as the Covenanter's Prison. His family lie with him.

== Family ==
He married Margaret (1697–1746), daughter of Sir Robert Dickson of Inveresk, Baronet. Their children died young: Barbara (1729–1759), David (1731–1747), Mary (1735–1747).

== Works ==
He collected the decisions of the court of session from 1733 to 1757, which were printed in 1813 by William Maxwell Morison. He wrote notes to the Institutes, of James Dalrymple, 1st Viscount of Stair, which appeared in 1824.
