= Edinburghshire (disambiguation) =

Edinburghshire, a historic shire of medieval Scotland, also known as Midlothian.

Edinburghshire may also refer to:

- Edinburghshire (Parliament of Scotland constituency)
- Edinburghshire (UK Parliament constituency)
- Edinburghshire Constabulary (1975–2013), the Lothian and Borders Police for the Scottish councils of Edinburgh, Midlothian, and others.
