= List of listed buildings in Edinburgh/31 =

This is a list of listed buildings in Edinburgh, Scotland.

== List ==
Name	Location	Date listed	Grid ref. (Note: Sometimes known as OSGB36, the grid reference (where provided) is based on the British national grid reference system used by the Ordnance Survey. • "Guide to National Grid". Ordnance Survey. • "Get-a-map". Ordnance Survey.)	Geo-coordinates	Notes	LB number (Note: Historic Environment Scotland assign a unique alphanumeric identifier to each designated site in Scotland, for listed buildings this always begins with "LB", for example "LB12345".)	Image
54 And 54A St Albans Road				55°55′50″N 3°10′58″W	Category B	30470	Upload Photo
10 Sciennes House Place, Former Causewayside Police Station				55°56′16″N 3°10′53″W	Category B	30478	Upload another image
10 Sciennes Road, Sciennes Primary School Including Playground Shelters, Gatepiers, Boundary Walls And Railings				55°56′18″N 3°11′16″W	Category B	30479	Upload Photo
54 And 56 Grange Loan				55°56′00″N 3°10′50″W	Category C(S)	30384	Upload Photo
8 Grange Road. Rockville Lodge, Including Boundary Walls				55°56′12″N 3°10′53″W	Category B	30393	Upload another image
50 Lauder Road And 10 Hatton Place With Boundary Wall				55°56′15″N 3°11′19″W	Category C(S)	30421	Upload Photo
56-60 (Even Nos) Marchmont Crescent				55°56′14″N 3°11′35″W	Category B	30436	Upload another image
62-66 (Even Nos) Marchmont Crescent				55°56′13″N 3°11′35″W	Category B	30437	Upload another image
1 Lauriston Place, Royal Infirmary, Medical Pavilions, Including Jubilee Pavilion And Linking Corridor				55°56′35″N 3°11′36″W	Category B	30307	Upload another image
2-20 (Even Nos) Earl Grey Street, And 2 West Tollcross, Methodist Central Hall				55°56′39″N 3°12′17″W	Category B	30326	Upload another image
55 Fountainhall Road Including Boundary Walls And Gatepiers				55°56′06″N 3°11′02″W	Category C(S)	30373	Upload Photo
Canongate/ Cranston Street, Police Box				55°57′03″N 3°11′02″W	Category B	30238	Upload Photo
39 Barnton Avenue, Woodcroft Including Stable Block				55°57′57″N 3°17′09″W	Category B	30284	Upload Photo
124 Mcdonald Road, Former Territorial Army Administration Block				55°57′50″N 3°11′10″W	Category B	30285	Upload Photo
2 Easter Belmont Road, 'Cuill'				55°56′56″N 3°15′10″W	Category C(S)	30296	Upload Photo
4 Easter Belmont Road				55°56′56″N 3°15′12″W	Category C(S)	30297	Upload Photo
137 And 138 Princes Street				55°57′02″N 3°12′24″W	Category B	30148	Upload Photo
9-13 (Odd Nos) Calton Hill				55°57′15″N 3°11′11″W	Category B	30203	Upload Photo
Granton Harbour, Mid Pier Including Slipways, Wharves And Lamp Standards				55°59′10″N 3°13′18″W	Category A	30216	Upload Photo
Granton Harbour, Mid Pier, Leading Light				55°59′09″N 3°13′21″W	Category B	30218	Upload Photo
Barnton House (Formerly) East Gates And Associated Well, East Barnton Avenue And Quality Street Davidson's Mains				55°57′55″N 3°16′29″W	Category B	30053	Upload Photo
Craiglockhart Dell West Grotto				55°55′13″N 3°14′58″W	Category B	30057	Upload Photo
34-40 (Even Nos) Broughton Street, And 1-7 (Odd Nos) Barony Street, Including Railings				55°57′29″N 3°11′23″W	Category A	30070	Upload Photo
Duddingston, The Causeway, Bella Vista Studio (Former Billiards-House) With Lamp Standards				55°56′33″N 3°08′57″W	Category C(S)	30076	Upload Photo
35-39 (Odd Nos) Cockburn Street				55°57′03″N 3°11′23″W	Category B	30080	Upload Photo
6 Cockburn Street				55°57′02″N 3°11′28″W	Category B	30086	Upload another image
1 Saxe Coburg Terrace And 29-35 Hamilton Place				55°57′35″N 3°12′24″W	Category B	30096	Upload Photo
90 And 90A George Street And 78 Rose Street Lane North				55°57′08″N 3°12′07″W	Category A	30107	Upload Photo
86-90 (Even Nos) Grassmarket				55°56′53″N 3°11′43″W	Category B	30112	Upload Photo
42 Laverockbank Road, Rose Villa, With Boundary Walls And Gatepiers				55°58′43″N 3°12′07″W	Category C(S)	30130	Upload Photo
34 York Place, Including Railings				55°57′23″N 3°11′25″W	Category A	29990	Upload Photo
3 York Road, With Boundary Wall And Gatepiers				55°58′35″N 3°12′11″W	Category B	29994	Upload Photo
19 Young Street				55°57′11″N 3°12′21″W	Category A	30003	Upload Photo
13 And 15 South College Street				55°56′48″N 3°11′13″W	Category B	30018	Upload Photo
Nicolson Street, Edinburgh Festival Theatre				55°56′48″N 3°11′11″W	Category B	30023	Upload Photo
Grindlay Street, Royal Lyceum Theatre				55°56′49″N 3°12′15″W	Category A	30031	Upload Photo
Rodney Street Tunnel				55°57′41″N 3°11′45″W	Category B	30037	Upload Photo
5 Drummond Street, Former St Patrick's Roman Catholic School Including Boundary Walls				55°56′52″N 3°11′05″W	Category B	30048	Upload Photo
114-118 (Even Nos) West Bow				55°56′53″N 3°11′39″W	Category B	29911	Upload Photo
1 West Register Street And 1-3 (Inclusive Nos) Gabriel's Road, Guildford Arms				55°57′13″N 3°11′25″W	Category B	29927	Upload another image
260 Willowbrae Road With Boundary Walls And Railings				55°56′45″N 3°08′11″W	Category B	29933	Upload Photo
14 Duddingston Mills				55°56′49″N 3°08′02″W	Category C(S)	29938	Upload Photo
Windsor Place Windsor Place Lodge Portobello				55°57′05″N 3°06′45″W	Category B	29941	Upload Photo
1 Woodhall Road, Dell Court, With Boundary And Retaining Walls, Steps, Gatepiers And Gate				55°54′26″N 3°15′19″W	Category C(S)	29946	Upload Photo
4 Woodhall Road, The Hollies, With Boundary Wall And Railings				55°54′25″N 3°15′27″W	Category C(S)	29954	Upload Photo
12 Woodhall Road, With Boundary Wall And Railings				55°54′24″N 3°15′30″W	Category C(S)	29957	Upload Photo
45, 45A And 45B York Place, Including Railings				55°57′22″N 3°11′21″W	Category B	29968	Upload Photo
29 Waterloo Place, Calton Convening Rooms				55°57′15″N 3°11′09″W	Category A	29897	Upload Photo
16-20 (Even Nos) Waterloo Place				55°57′13″N 3°11′13″W	Category A	29899	Upload Photo
87 And 87A West Bow				55°56′54″N 3°11′41″W	Category B	29902	Upload Photo
60-64 (Even Nos) Thistle Street				55°57′14″N 3°11′59″W	Category B	29844	Upload Photo
2 Pier Place				55°58′51″N 3°11′43″W	Category C(S)	29849	Upload Photo
30 Trinity Crescent, With Railings And Gateposts				55°58′47″N 3°12′14″W	Category C(S)	29855	Upload Photo
8-20 (Even Nos) Victoria Street				55°56′56″N 3°11′37″W	Category B	29871	Upload another image
21 And 23 Scotland Street, Including Railings				55°57′36″N 3°11′41″W	Category B	29775	Upload Photo
24 St Andrew Square With Railings				55°57′18″N 3°11′37″W	Category C(S)	29701	Upload Photo
59-63 (Odd Nos) Rose Street				55°57′09″N 3°11′57″W	Category B	29634	Upload Photo
89-93 (Odd Nos) Rose Street				55°57′08″N 3°12′04″W	Category B	29639	Upload another image
43, Hogarth House, And 44 Queen Street With Railings And Lamp Standards				55°57′15″N 3°12′08″W	Category A	29556	Upload Photo
45-47 (Inclusive Nos) Queen Street With Railings And Lamp Standard				55°57′14″N 3°12′08″W	Category A	29557	Upload Photo
61, 61A, 62 & 63 Queen Street				55°57′13″N 3°12′17″W	Category A	29567	Upload Photo
65 Queen Street With Railings And Lamp Standard				55°57′13″N 3°12′19″W	Category A	29569	Upload Photo
7 Queensferry Road, Dean Park House (Stewart's Melville Boarding House) Including Former Coach House				55°57′16″N 3°13′46″W	Category A	29575	Upload Photo
8 Pentland Avenue With Boundary Wall And Gate				55°54′32″N 3°15′41″W	Category C(S)	29483	Upload Photo
42 Pentland Avenue, Binley Cottage, With Boundary Wall And Gatepiers				55°54′27″N 3°15′57″W	Category B	29485	Upload Photo
1 Pentland Road, Stonehouse, With Boundary Wall, Gatepiers And Garden Terrace				55°54′32″N 3°15′51″W	Category A	29486	Upload Photo
19 And 20 Princes Street, Incorporating The Royal British Hotel				55°57′12″N 3°11′27″W	Category B	29502	Upload Photo
47-52 (Inclusive Nos) Princes Street And South St David Street, Jenners Department Store, Including Gothic Streetlight				55°57′11″N 3°11′39″W	Category A	29505	Upload another image
11-13 (Inclusive Nos) Queen Street With Front Walls And Railings				55°57′18″N 3°11′48″W	Category A	29536	Upload Photo
9-13 (Odd Nos) Nelson Street, Including Railings And Lamps				55°57′25″N 3°11′46″W	Category A	29385	Upload Photo
5 New Street, Canongate Venture, Including Boundary Walls And Gatepiers				55°57′05″N 3°10′58″W	Category C(S)	29393	Upload Photo
190 And 192 Newhaven Road, Including Gatepiers And Boundary Walls				55°58′38″N 3°11′32″W	Category B	29399	Upload Photo
18 And 20 Nicolson Street				55°56′47″N 3°11′06″W	Category B	29418	Upload Photo
Nicolson Street, 94-98				55°56′41″N 3°11′01″W	Category B	29423	Upload Photo
51 Minto Street, Birch House, Including Boundary Wall And Pedestrian Gate				55°56′13″N 3°10′41″W	Category B	29365	Upload Photo
176-180 (Even Nos) Morrison Street, Including Railings				55°56′47″N 3°12′43″W	Category B	29377	Upload another image
2 Mound Place, Patrick Geddes Hall (Part)				55°56′59″N 3°11′45″W	Category A	29380	Upload another image
7-14 (Inclusive Numbers) Melville Place				55°57′05″N 3°12′42″W	Category B	29323	Upload Photo
3 Merchant Street				55°56′52″N 3°11′32″W	Category B	29329	Upload Photo
Main Street 27 Rose Cottage Davidsons Mains				55°57′56″N 3°16′25″W	Category C(S)	29278	Upload Photo
13 And 15 Leith Street				55°57′14″N 3°11′17″W	Category B	29250	Upload Photo
1, 1A And 3 Leven Street				55°56′31″N 3°12′14″W	Category C(S)	29259	Upload Photo
60 And 62 Laverockbank Road And 20 Starbank Road, Starbank Arms				55°58′47″N 3°12′08″W	Category B	29225	Upload Photo
4, 5, 6 Melville Crescent, 43 Melville Street, 19 Walker Street Including Railings And Arched Lamp Holders				55°57′00″N 3°11′36″W	Category A	29230	Upload Photo
Inverleith Place, 52-54				55°58′00″N 3°12′54″W	Category B	29154	Upload Photo
Inverleith Row, 8				55°57′54″N 3°12′13″W	Category A	29157	Upload Photo
Inverleith Row, 15 And 15A				55°57′57″N 3°12′15″W	Category B	29161	Upload Photo
Inverleith Row, 27				55°58′04″N 3°12′22″W	Category B	29170	Upload Photo
Inverleith Terrace 16 The Little House				55°57′49″N 3°12′14″W	Category B	29187	Upload Photo
9 And 9A Holyrood Road And 18 Gullan's Close				55°56′58″N 3°10′58″W	Category C(S)	29089	Upload Photo
107-119 (Odd Nos) High Street				55°57′02″N 3°11′11″W	Category B	29039	Upload Photo
10-12 (Even Nos) High Street				55°57′01″N 3°11′04″W	Category B	29056	Upload Photo
High Street, Tweedale Court, Walling To West Of Court And To South Of Tweedale House				55°57′01″N 3°11′04″W	Category B	29058	Upload Photo
56, 58 And 60 High Street And 1 And 3 Blackfriars Street				55°57′01″N 3°11′10″W	Category B	29064	Upload Photo
2 Granton Road, Including Boundary Wall				55°58′15″N 3°12′53″W	Category B	28929	Upload Photo
7 Granton Square, The Anchorage				55°58′50″N 3°13′25″W	Category C(S)	28931	Upload Photo
66-68 (Even Nos) Grassmarket				55°56′52″N 3°11′45″W	Category B	28940	Upload another image
98 Grassmarket And 105 West Bow				55°56′53″N 3°11′41″W	Category A	28943	Upload another image
6 South Gray Street, Including Boundary Walls, Gatepiers And Pedestrian Gateway				55°56′03″N 3°10′37″W	Category B	28946	Upload Photo
11 Upper Gray Street Including Boundary Walls				55°56′11″N 3°10′43″W	Category B	28952	Upload Photo
137, 137A, 139 And 141 George Street With Railings				55°57′08″N 3°12′22″W	Category B	28860	Upload Photo
14 George Street, Former Commercial Bank, Incorporating Boundary Walls, Railings And Balustrades, Flanking Gateways And Pavilions, And Lamp Standards				55°57′12″N 3°11′44″W	Category A	28862	Upload Photo
26 George Street And 53 And 55 Hanover Street				55°57′12″N 3°11′49″W	Category A	28865	Upload another image
112 George Street With Railings And Lamp Standards				55°57′08″N 3°12′15″W	Category A	28883	Upload Photo
118 George Street With Railings				55°57′07″N 3°12′17″W	Category B	28884	Upload Photo
120-124 (Even Nos) George Street, Tsb Offices, With Railings				55°57′07″N 3°12′17″W	Category B	28885	Upload Photo
Gillespie Road 21, Pentland Cottage				55°54′25″N 3°16′06″W	Category B	28894	Upload Photo
23 Gilmore Place Including Boundary Walls				55°56′30″N 3°12′17″W	Category C(S)	28903	Upload Photo
46 Gilmore Place				55°56′29″N 3°12′29″W	Category C(S)	28915	Upload Photo
5, 7 And 7A Frederick Street (Formerly Queen's Club)				55°57′07″N 3°11′58″W	Category B	28779	Upload Photo
6-10 (Even Nos) Frederick Street				55°57′07″N 3°12′00″W	Category B	28788	Upload Photo
20 And 22 Frederick Street (And 77 Rose Street)				55°57′08″N 3°12′01″W	Category B	28791	Upload Photo
4 Gayfield Square Including Boundary Wall, Gatepiers And Railings				55°57′32″N 3°11′10″W	Category B	28800	Upload Photo
George Square 55				55°56′38″N 3°11′14″W	Category A	28823	Upload another image
George Square 59				55°56′39″N 3°11′14″W	Category A	28826	Upload Photo
43 George Street				55°57′13″N 3°11′55″W	Category B	28835	Upload Photo
6 Easter Belmont Road, 'Ardnasaid'				55°56′56″N 3°15′16″W	Category B	28727	Upload Photo
3 Fishmarket Square And 2 Wester Close				55°58′50″N 3°11′42″W	Category C(S)	28766	Upload Photo
6-10A (Even Nos) Dublin Street, Including Railings				55°57′22″N 3°11′36″W	Category B	28689	Upload Photo
48 Duddingston Road West				55°56′40″N 3°08′21″W	Category B	28698	Upload Photo
12-16 (Even Nos) Dundas Street, Including Railings				55°57′23″N 3°11′57″W	Category B	28714	Upload Photo
1A Upper Dean Terrace And 2 Danube Street				55°57′23″N 3°12′42″W	Category A	28646	Upload Photo
58 Dalkeith Road, Physician And Firkin Public House				55°56′18″N 3°10′26″W	Category B	28621	Upload Photo
74 Dalkeith Road, Blacket Avenue Lodge And Gatepiers				55°56′14″N 3°10′17″W	Category B	28625	Upload Photo
Upper Coltbridge Terrace St George's School Main Block Only				55°57′01″N 3°13′58″W	Category B	28582	Upload Photo
39 Corstorphine Road, Including Boundary Wall				55°56′43″N 3°14′32″W	Category C(S)	28587	Upload Photo
11 And 13 South Charlotte Street With Railings And Lamp Standard				55°57′04″N 3°12′21″W	Category A	28514	Upload another image
64 Canongate, Queensberry House				55°57′07″N 3°10′34″W	Category A	28440	Upload another image
168-172 (Even Nos) Canongate				55°57′04″N 3°10′49″W	Category B	28448	Upload another image
28 Castle Street With Railings And Lamp Standards				55°57′07″N 3°12′13″W	Category A	28474	Upload Photo
36-40 (Even Nos) North Castle Street With Railings				55°57′10″N 3°12′15″W	Category A	28476	Upload Photo
54-58 (Even Nos) And 58A North Castle Street With Railings				55°57′12″N 3°12′16″W	Category A	28479	Upload Photo
3 And 4 Castle Terrace, Including Boundary Wall And Railings				55°56′55″N 3°12′21″W	Category B	28481	Upload Photo
53 And 54 Bruntsfield Place Including Boundary Walls				55°56′20″N 3°12′19″W	Category B	28376	Upload Photo
105 Buccleuch Street				55°56′31″N 3°11′02″W	Category C(S)	28396	Upload Photo
17-21 (Odd Nos) Blackfriars Street (Former United Presbyterian Church)				55°57′00″N 3°11′09″W	Category B	28323	Upload Photo
9-15 (Odd Nos) Blair Street				55°56′58″N 3°11′17″W	Category B	28330	Upload Photo
55-63 (Odd Nos) Broughton Street				55°57′29″N 3°11′20″W	Category B	28363	Upload Photo
Blacket Avenue And Minto Street Gatepiers And Boundary Walls To Blacket Estate				55°56′08″N 3°10′34″W	Category B	28297	Upload Photo
4 Blacket Place, Including Boundary Walls				55°56′15″N 3°10′24″W	Category B	28308	Upload Photo
Ann Street 50				55°57′21″N 3°12′43″W	Category B	28250	Upload Photo
6, 8 And 10 Bangholm Bower Avenue, Bangholm Bower House				55°58′18″N 3°12′26″W	Category B	28262	Upload Photo
141 Redford Road, Drummond Scrolls				55°54′20″N 3°14′29″W	Category B	28116	Upload Photo
159 Newhaven Road, Victoria Park House				55°58′34″N 3°11′35″W	Category C(S)	28126	Upload Photo
Woodhall House Woodhall Road				55°54′06″N 3°17′07″W	Category B	28130	Upload Photo
9 Bonaly Road With Boundary Wall, Gate Piers And Gates				55°54′08″N 3°15′32″W	Category C(S)	28150	Upload Photo
Dreghorn Mains, Woodend Cottage				55°54′04″N 3°14′04″W	Category C(S)	28169	Upload Photo
Spylaw Farm Steading Off Gillespie Road Colinton				55°54′22″N 3°16′17″W	Category C(S)	28200	Upload Photo
Cammo Road, Cammo Estate, Water Tower (Off Cammo Walk)				55°57′15″N 3°19′17″W	Category B	28039	Upload another image See more images
Gilmerton, The Drum, Mercat Cross				55°54′25″N 3°07′11″W	Category C(S)	28053	Upload another image See more images

== Key ==
The scheme for classifying buildings in Scotland is:

- Category A: "buildings of national or international importance, either architectural or historic; or fine, little-altered examples of some particular period, style or building type."
- Category B: "buildings of regional or more than local importance; or major examples of some particular period, style or building type, which may have been altered."
- Category C: "buildings of local importance; lesser examples of any period, style, or building type, as originally constructed or moderately altered; and simple traditional buildings which group well with other listed buildings."

In March 2016 there were 47,288 listed buildings in Scotland. Of these, 8% were Category A, and 50% were Category B, with the remaining 42% being Category C.

== See also ==
- List of listed buildings in Edinburgh
