= Archibald Dickson =

Royal Navy admiral (c.1739–1803)

Admiral Sir Archibald Dickson Bt
- Died: 1803
- Military career
- Allegiance: United Kingdom
- Branch: Royal Navy
- Rank: Admiral
- Commands: HMS Antelope; HMS Greyhound; HMS Dublin; HMS Goliath; HMS Captain; HMS Egmont; North Sea
- Conflicts: American Revolutionary War

Admiral Sir Archibald Dickson, 1st Baronet (c. 1739–1803) was a Royal Navy officer.

== Naval career ==
He was born around 1739, the son of Archibald Dickson. He initially entered the merchant navy in 1752. He moved to the Royal Navy in 1755 and passed the lieutenant exam in 1759.

In 1765, he was given command of Egmont, and in 1771, he took command of HMS Thunder.

Promoted to captain on 31 January 1774, Dickson was given command of the fourth-rate HMS Antelope in January 1774 and the sixth-rate HMS Greyhound in October 1775. In Greyhound, he took part in the action against the Penobscot Expedition in July 1779 and fought at the Battle of Martinique in April 1780 during the American Revolutionary War. He was next given command of the third-rate HMS Dublin and saw action at the Battle of Cape Spartel in October 1782. After that, he was given command of the third-rate HMS Goliath in 1786, of the third-rate HMS Captain in 1790, and of the third-rate HMS Egmont in 1793.

Promoted to rear-admiral on 12 April 1794, and vice-admiral on 1 June 1795, Dickson became Commander-in-Chief, North Sea in 1800. In August 1800, a diplomatic mission was sent to Copenhagen under Lord Whitworth, accompanied by a fleet under Dickson's command. He was promoted to full admiral on 1 January 1801, with HMS Princess of Orange at Yarmouth serving as his flagship. She was paid off in April 1802.

== Baronetcy and death ==
In honour of his service, Dickson was created Sir Archibald Dickson, 1st Baronet, on 21 September 1802.

He died near Norwich in May 1803.

== Family ==
Dickson had married twice: firstly to Elizabeth Porter, who died in 1779, and (after a 20-year wait), in 1800, he married Frances Anne Willis.

He had a daughter, Elizabeth Dickson (d.1856), but no male heir. Therefore, the baronetcy passed to his nephew, Archibald Collingwood Dickson.

== Sources ==
- Tracy, Nicholas (2006). Who's who in Nelson's Navy: 200 Naval Heroes. London: Chatham Publishing. ISBN 1-86176-244-5.

Military offices
Preceded by Viscount Duncan	Commander-in-Chief, North Sea; 1800–1802	Succeeded by Viscount Keith
Baronetage of the United Kingdom
New creation	Baronet (of Hardingham Hall); 1802–1803	Succeeded by Archibald Collingwood Dickson
