= HMS Dublin (1757) =

Ship of the line of the Royal Navy

History

Great Britain
- Name: HMS Dublin
- Ordered: 26 August 1755
- Builder: Deptford dockyard
- Laid down: 18 November 1755
- Launched: 6 May 1757
- Commissioned: April 1757
- Decommissioned: February 1783
- Out of service: 13 May 1784
- Fate: Broken up, 1784

General characteristics
- Class & type: Dublin-class ship of the line
- Tons burthen: 156263/94 (bm)
- Length: 165 ft 6 in (50.44 m) (gundeck)
- Beam: 46 ft 6 in (14.17 m)
- Depth of hold: 19 ft 9 in (6.02 m)
- Propulsion: Sails
- Sail plan: Full-rigged ship
- Armament: 74 guns: Gundeck: 28 × 32 pdrs; Upper gundeck: 28 × 18 pdrs; Quarterdeck: 14 × 9 pdrs; Forecastle: 4 × 9 pdrs

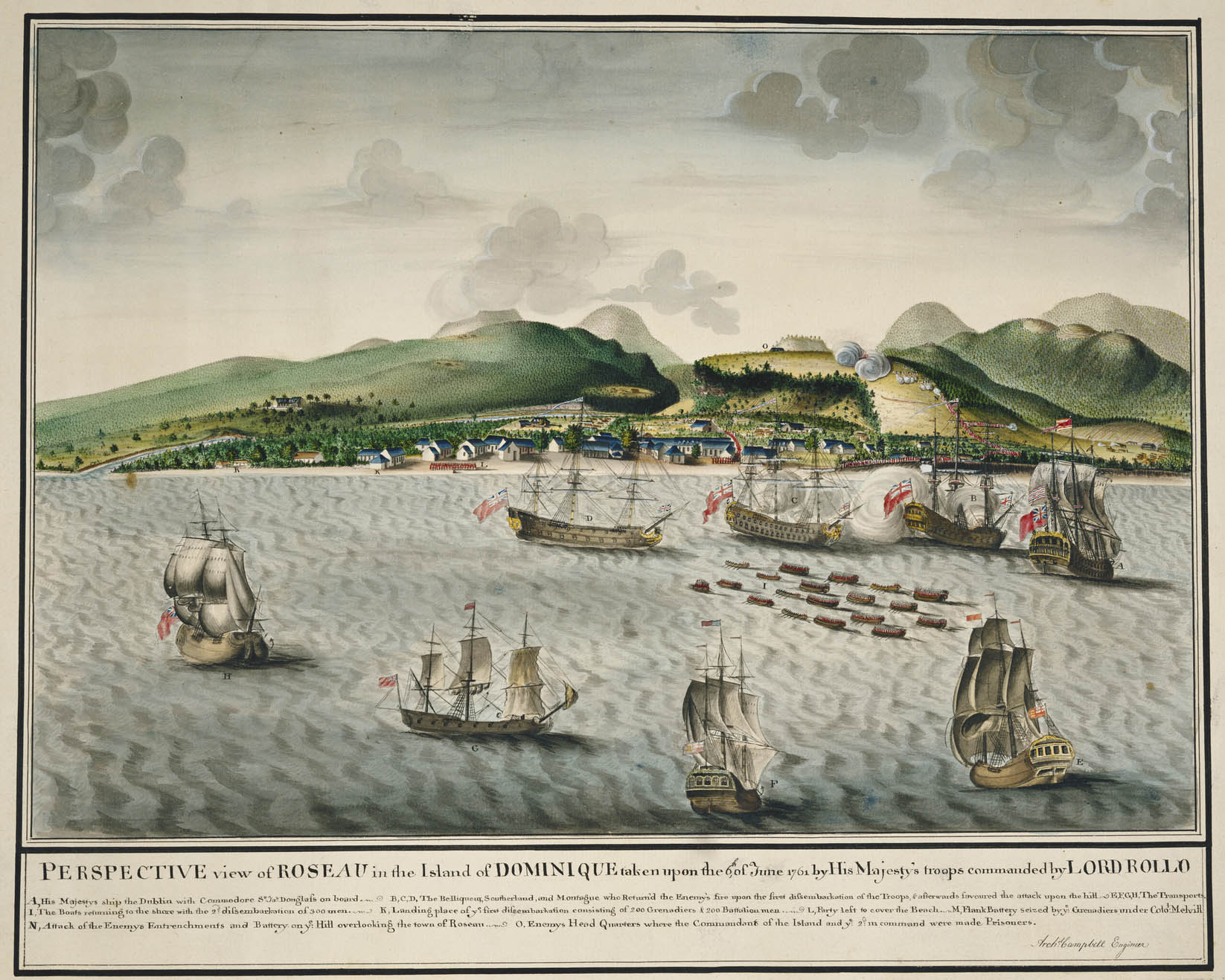
Dublin the flagship of Andrew Rollo, 5th Lord Rollo at Roseau, Dominica on 6 June 1761

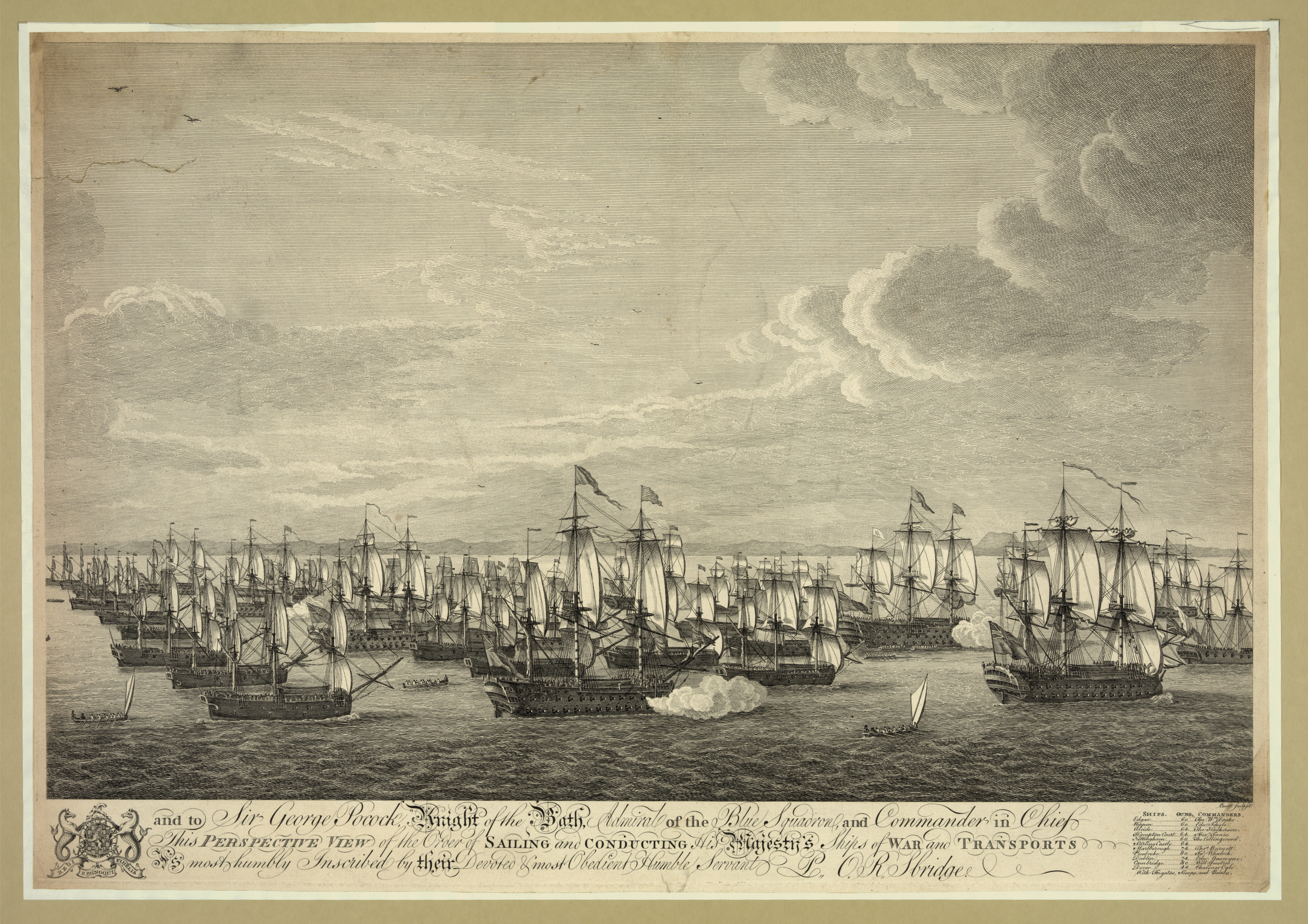
Shown here as a member Sir George Pocock's Blue Squadron, circa 1762

HMS Dublin was a 74-gun third rate ship of the line of the Royal Navy, built by Adam Hayes at Deptford Dockyard and launched on 6 May 1757.

== Service history ==
Her first commander was Captain George Brydges Rodney. Under Rodney, the ship and her huge crew of 550 men was part of the unsuccessful 20-ship British raid on the French port of Rochefort on 5 September 1757 during the Seven Years' War.

In March 1758, she sailed to North America, capturing the privateer Le Montmartel on 21 March. In June 1759, she took part in the Siege of Quebec involving around 50 British vessels.

In March 1760, she sailed to the Leeward Islands. On 1 August, she captured the French privateer La Charlotte in the West Indies, and on 23 August captured the French privateer L'Intrepide. She was stationed at Domenica in June 1761 and in January 1762 participated in British operations at Martinique. In April 1762, she sailed to Jamaica. In June 1762, she was part of the attack on Havana in Cuba.

From 1763 to 1779, she underwent considerable repairs and refitting at Plymouth Dockyard and returned to active service in December 1779.

In January 1780, she was part of a huge British attack (around 30 ships) on the Caracas convoy, which had only seven armed ships protecting around 20 merchant ships. All the Spanish ships were captured.

From January to April 1780, she took part in the relief of Gibraltar. On 20 October 1782, she took part in the Battle of Cape Spartel.

In February 1783, she was brought to Plymouth Dockyard for repair, but after survey, was instead paid off on 19 February. She was broken up at Plymouth in May 1785.

== Notable commanders ==
- George Brydges Rodney (1757–1759)
- Paul Henry Ourry (1771–1773)
- Samuel Wallis (1779/80)
- Archibald Dickson (1781–1783)

== Notable crew ==
- Charles Holmes, flag officer (1759/60)
- Sir James Douglas, flag officer (1762/63)
- George Edgcumbe, flag officer (1771)
- Alexander Graeme, lieutenant (1760/62)
