= Margaret Mitchelson =

Scottish prophet

- Occupation: prophet
- Known for: supporting the Covenanters

Margaret Mitchelson (fl. 1638 ) was a Scottish prophet. Her father may have been the East Lothian minister of Yester, James Mitchelson.

She came to notice in September 1638 when she claimed that she knew that the National Covenant would triumph over the King's Covenant. She had the support of Henry Rollock minister of Trinity College parish in Edinburgh and the leading covenenter Archibald Johnston of Wariston. She would attract huge crowds who would come to hear and to watch as she underwent fits. It was said that her words were taken down in shorthand and distributed to the crowd.

None of her prophesies appear to have been published. She is not recorded after 1638 but she is credited with improving the morale of the covenanters.
