= James Dundas, Lord Arniston =

Scottish politician and judge (1620-1679)

Sir James Dundas, Lord Arniston
- Born: 1620; Midlothian, Scotland
- Died: 1679 (aged 58–59); Arniston, Scotland
- Education: University of St Andrews
- Occupations: Politician and jurist
- Spouses: Marion Boyd (m. 1641, ?) Janet Hepburn (before 1665) Helen Skene (m. 1666, ?)
- Children: 7, including Robert

Sir James Dundas, Lord Arniston (1620–1679) was a Scottish politician and judge. He served as a shire commissioner to the Scottish Parliament.

== Life ==
He was son of Sir James Dundas of Arniston, Midlothian, governor of Berwick under James I, and Marie, daughter of George Home of Wedderburn. He was educated at the University of St Andrews. In 1639, he signed the national covenant; in 1640 he was appointed an elder of the church, and on 16 November 1641, he was knighted by Charles I.

He represented Edinburgh in parliament in 1648, and was commissioner for war within the sheriffdom of that city between 1643 and 1648, sat on a commission composed partly of lawyers and partly of laymen, to which the liquidation of the insolvent estates of the Earl of Stirling and Lord Alexander was referred in 1644; on a parliamentary committee of 18 appointed to consider of dangers threatening religion, the covenant, and the monarchy, and how to meet them; on another "close and secret" committee of six empowered to take steps rendered necessary by the presence of garrisons of "malignants and sectaries" in Berwick and Carlisle in March 1648; and on 11 May was appointed one of the "committee of estates" in which supreme power was vested during the adjournment of parliament. The same year he was also a member of a committee for considering of ecclesiastical matters in conference with the commissioners of the kirk, and was added to the "commission for the plantation of the kirks". He signed the solemn league and covenant, apparently with some reluctance, in 1650. From that date his history is a blank until we find him again a member of the commission for the plantation of kirks in 1661, and also one of the commissioners for raising the sum of £40,000 granted to the king in that year.

Though not a trained lawyer, he was nominated an ordinary Lord of session, and assumed the title of Lord Arniston, on 16 May 1662; and having satisfied the court of his knowledge of law was admitted to the College of Justice on 4 June. His tenure of office, however, was brief. In 1663 a statute was passed requiring all public officials to subscribe a declaration, affirming the duty of passive obedience, and renouncing the solemn league and covenant. Being unable conscientiously to sign the declaration, Dundas sent in his resignation. It was signed by ten of the Judges on 10 November 1663, Dundas being absent. Though the time for signature was extended in his case until 8 January 1664, and then for a further period of 18 months, and though he was frequently pressed to reconsider the matter, Dundas steadily refused to sign unless he were permitted to qualify the clause in the declaration abjuring the covenant by the words, "in so far as it led to deeds of actual rebellion". The compromise was not accepted, but it was notified to him that if he would sign the declaration as it stood the king would permit him to make reservation in private audience. To this Dundas replied: "If my subscription is to be public, I cannot be satisfied that the salvo should be latent". On 28 August 1665, Sir John Lockhart of Castlehill was appointed to succeed him.

Dundas died at Arniston in October 1679.

== Family ==
He married, first, in 1641, Marion, daughter of Robert Boyd, 7th Lord Boyd, together they had three daughters and a son, Robert Dundas, also a Lord of Session.

He secondly, Janet Hepburn, daughter of Sir Adam Hepburn, Lord Humbie, the widow of Sir John Cockburn of Ormiston, together they had three sons; thirdly, in 1666, Helen, daughter of Sir James Skene, president of the Court of Session, and widow of Sir Charles Erskine of Alva.
