= Woodhall House, Edinburgh =

Coordinates: 55.901391°N 3.285239°W

Woodhall House
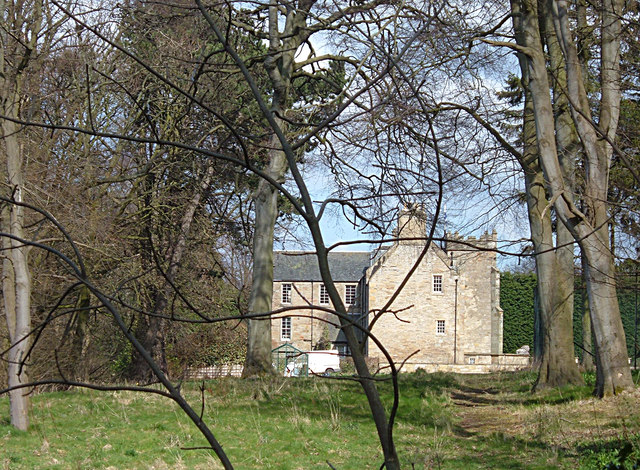
- View of the east side of the house from the track that links Woodhall Road to Blinkbonny Road.

- Location in Edinburgh
- Location: Juniper Green, Edinburgh
- Country: Scotland
- Denomination: Roman Catholic

History
- Status: Closed
- Founded: 1959
- Founder: Society of Jesus

Architecture
- Functional status: Private House
- Heritage designation: Category B
- Designated: 19 December 1979
- Closed: 1976

Woodhall House is a Scottish mansion house, first recorded in 1707. It was also an institution run by the Society of Jesus in the late 20th century. It is situated off Woodhall Road in the Juniper Green area of Edinburgh, Scotland and is a category B listed building.

== History ==
=== Foulis baronets ===
Juniper Green is first recorded in 1707, when only Baberton House and Woodhall House were the only buildings in the area. The owner at that time was a William Foulis of the Foulis baronets who inherited Woodhall House from Sir John Foulis.

Eventually, it passed to Sir James Foulis who owned Woodhall from 1796 to his death in 1842. The house continued to pass down the Liston-Foulis baronets of Colinton until it was sold to Professor Stanley Patrick Davidson.

In 1921, Professor Davidson became a member of the Royal College of Surgeons. He was President of the Royal College of Physicians in Edinburgh from 1953 to 1957. In 1959, he retired and Woodhall House was sold again.

=== Society of Jesus ===
In 1959, Woodhall House was bought for £8000 by the Society of Jesus. It originally served as a retreat house for weekend retreats in Ignatian spirituality for working men's sodalities and parish groups as well as being the novitiate for the proposed Scottish Province of Jesuits. They intended to create a Scottish Province of Jesuits that would extend their pre-existing works in Scotland and would also build a link between Scottish Jesuits and Jesuits working abroad such as in, what was then known as, British Guyana.

The Jesuits built Woodhall Court as a novitiate for Scotland in early September 1963. Fr James Christie SJ from Sacred Heart Church, Edinburgh was the first rector at the novitiate and the prefect of studies was the notable theologian and hymnwriter Fr James J. Quinn SJ. The first Mass in the novitiate chapel was celebrated by the Archbishop of St. Andrews and Edinburgh, Cardinal Gordon Gray.

By 1964, all the Jesuit novices in Britain were sent to the house for their training.

In 1970, the Jesuit novitiate left Woodhall House and the novices were transferred to Loyola Hall outside Liverpool. The Society of Jesus went on to sell Woodhall House in 1976 to a private owner.

== Present ==
Soon after the Jesuits sold the property, Woodhall Court was let out to students of Edinburgh Napier University and Moray House School of Education. In 1982, it was converted into 17 private residential flats. Woodhall House is privately owned.

== See also ==
- Society of Jesus
- Ignatian spirituality
- Juniper Green
