= Dickson baronets =

There have been eight baronets surnamed Dickson holding between them two baronetcies:

The Dickson baronetcy of Sornbeg in Ayrshire was created in the Baronetage of Nova Scotia on 28 February 1695 for Robert Dickson and became either extinct or dormant on the death of the second baronet in 1760.

The Dickson baronetcy of Hardingham Hall in Norfolk was created in the Baronetage of the United Kingdom on 21 September 1802 for Admiral Archibald Dickson. The 6th baronet was elevated to the peerage as Baron Islington in 1910 and died with no son in 1936, when his titles became extinct.

Name	Baronetcy	Succession date
Sir Robert Dickson	Dickson of Sornbeg, 1st	1695 (creation)
Sir Robert Dickson	Dickson of Sornbeg, 2nd	1711; extinct 1760
Adm Sir Archibald Dickson	Dickson of Hardingham Hall, 1st	1802 (creation)
Sir Archibald Collingwood Dickson	Dickson of Hardingham Hall, 2nd	1803
Sir William Dickson	Dickson of Hardingham Hall, 3rd	1827
Sir Colpoys Dickson	Dickson of Hardingham Hall, 4th	1868
Sir Alexander Collingwood Thomas Dickson	Dickson of Hardingham Hall, 5th	1868
Sir John Dickson, later Dickson-Poynder (from 1886); created Baron Islington 1910	Dickson of Hardingham Hall, 6th	1884; extinct 1936
