= Archibald Johnston =

Scottish judge & statesman (1611–1663)

The Right Honourable The Lord Johnston of Wariston
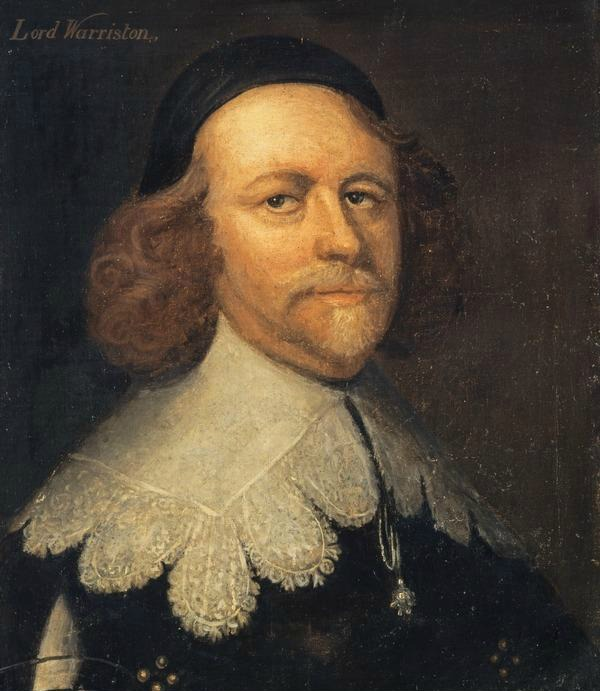

Personal details
- Born: Archibald Johnston; 28 March 1611 (baptised)
- Died: 22 July 1663 (aged 52) (hanged)
- Education: University of Glasgow

Arms of Johnston: Argent, a saltire sable, on a chief gules three cushions or.

Archibald Johnston, Lord Wariston (1611 – 1663) was a Scottish judge and statesman.

He assisted Alexander Henderson in writing the Scottish National Covenant in 1638, and was appointed Procurator of the Kirk in the same year. He was said to have supported the prophesies of Margaret Mitchelson as true.

Johnston helped negotiate the pacification of Berwick in 1639 and the treaty of Ripon in 1640. He was Lord of Session as Lord Warriston in 1641. In 1643 as commissioner for Midlothian he opposed neutrality in English affairs.

He played a prominent part in the Westminster Assembly, and in 1644 became a member of the Committee of Both Kingdoms representing Scotland in London. Named King's Advocate by Charles I in 1646, he resisted the Engagement of 1648, and may have drawn up the Act of Classes in 1649. He was appointed Lord Clerk Register in 1649 and is said to have given Leslie fatal advice at the Battle of Dunbar in 1650, after which he lost his offices.

In 1657, as a leading Remonstrant (see below), he was renamed by the Lord Protector Oliver Cromwell as Lord Clerk Register. He was a member of Oliver and Richard Cromwell's House of Lords and a member of the Council of State. On the restoration of the Rump Parliament in 1649, and on its suppression, he became permanent president of the Committee of Safety.

After the restoration of the monarchy he fled abroad. He was condemned to death in absentia and arrested in Rouen. With Louis XIV's consent he was returned to Britain and after a spell of imprisonment in the Tower of London was hanged in Edinburgh on 22 July 1663.

== Early life ==
Archibald Johnston was a son of James Johnston (died 1617), a merchant burgess of Edinburgh. He was baptised on 28 March 1611, educated at the University of Glasgow, and admitted to the Faculty of Advocates in 1633.

== Early career ==
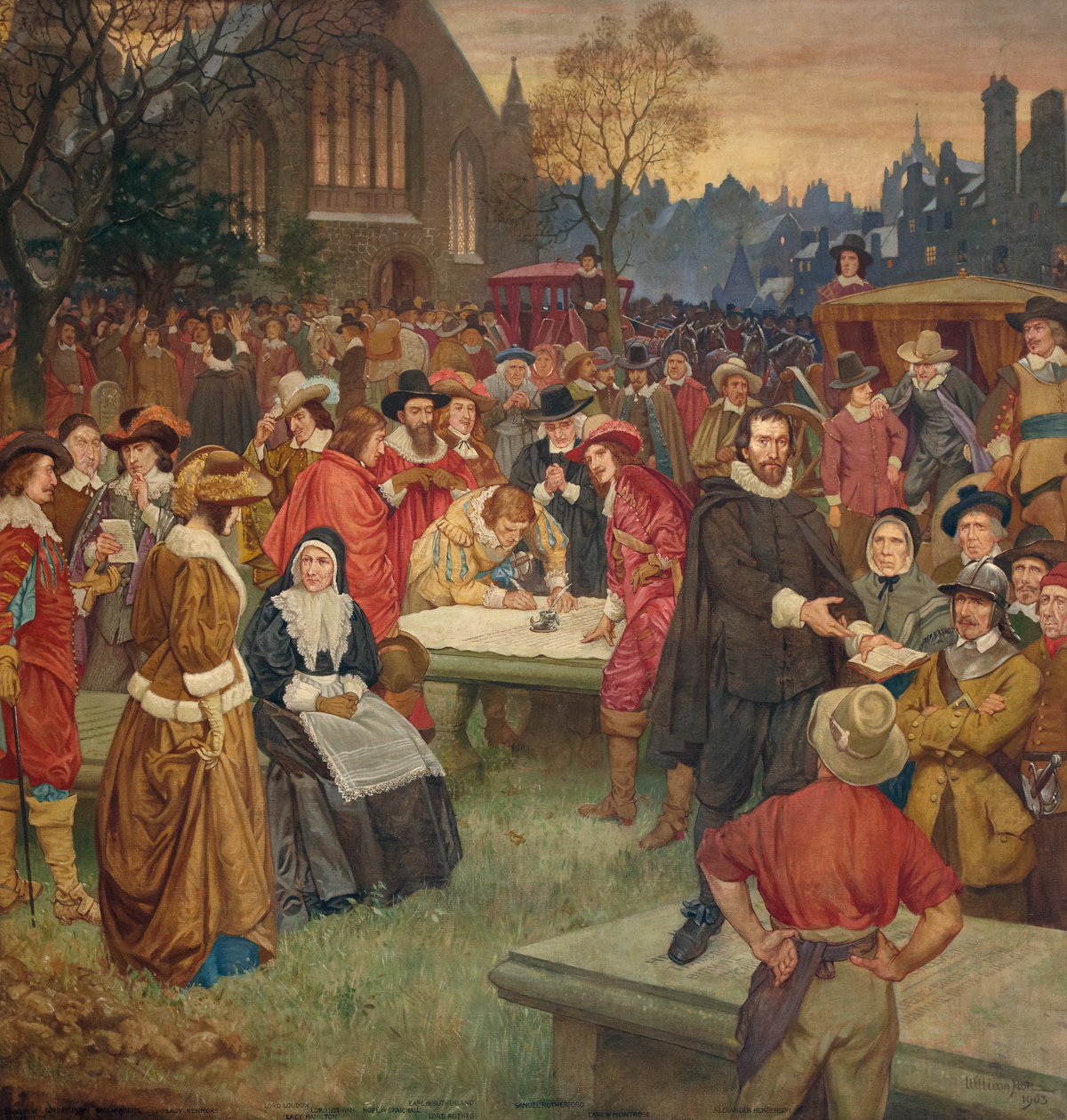
The Signing of the National Covenant. The Victorian painter William Hole places Alexander Henderson (standing on the gravestone) at the centre of events in 1638. Archibald Johnston is on the left.

Johnston first came to public notice in 1637 during Charles I's attempt to force an Episcopalian liturgy upon Scotland. As the chief adviser of the covenanting leaders Johnston drew up their remonstrances. On 22 February 1638, in reply to a royal proclamation, he read a strong protestation to an enormous multitude assembled at the Mercat Cross in Edinburgh. Together with Alexander Henderson he was the co-author of the National Covenant of 1638, drawing up the second part as a recapitulation of all the Acts of Parliament that had condemned "popery" while asserting the liberties of the Scottish church. He was said to have supported the prophesies of Margaret Mitchelson who predicted the success of the National Covenant.

Johnston was appointed clerk to the Tables (the revolutionary executive) and also clerk and afterwards procurator or counsel to the General Assembly held at Glasgow the same year, when he discovered and presented several missing volumes of records. In June 1639 he took part in the negotiations leading to the Pacification of Berwick which ended the first Bishops' War. His firm attitude displeased the king extremely. After Charles promised a new Assembly and Parliament to settle the church question, Johnston responded by accusing him of playing for time, to which the king replied in anger "that the devil himself could not make a more uncharitable construction or give a more bitter expression"; and on Johnston continuing his speech ordered him to be silent and declared he would speak to more reasonable men.

In August Johnston read a paper before the Parliament of Scotland, strongly condemning its prorogation. In the following year he was appointed to attend the general of the army and the committee, and on 23 June, when the Scottish forces were preparing to invade England, he wrote to Thomas, Lord Savile asking for definite support from the leading opposition peers in England and their acceptance of the National Covenant, which drew from the other side at first nothing but vague assurances.

In October Johnston was a commissioner for negotiating the Treaty of Ripon and went to London. After the peace he continued to urge punishment of the incendiaries, especially of Traquair, and in a private interview with the king strongly opposed the proposed act of general oblivion. On the King's arrival in Scotland in 1641 he led the opposition on the important constitutional point of the control of state appointments, supporting the claims of the parliament by an appeal to the state records he had succeeded in recovering.

== Lord of Session ==
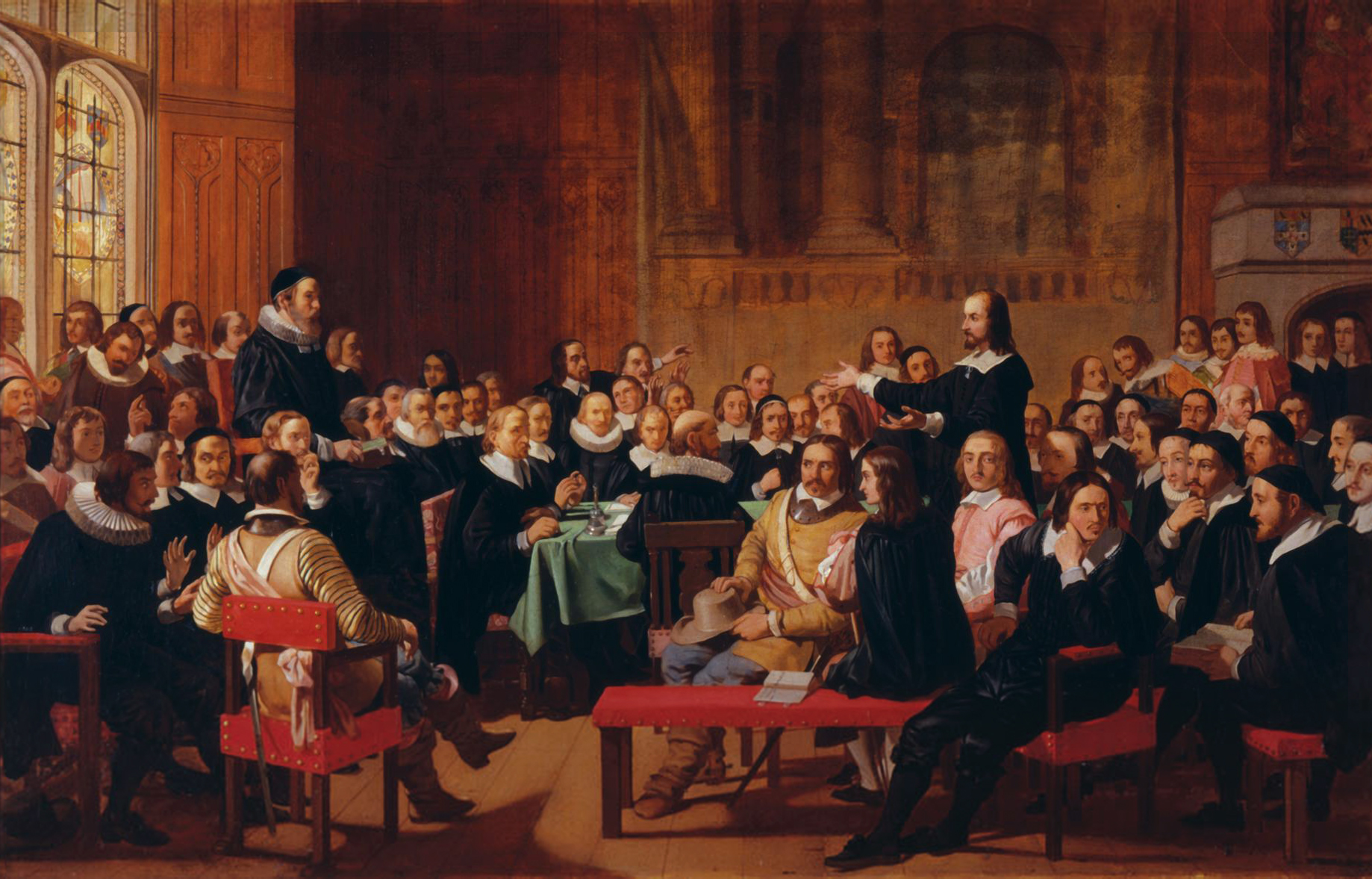
Assertion of Liberty of Conscience by the Independents of the Westminster Assembly of Divines, 1644

In September, Johnston received public thanks for his services from the Scottish parliament, and, in accordance with the policy of conciliation then pursued for a short time by the King, was appointed on 13 November 1641 a Lord of Session, with the title Lord Warriston (from his estate at Currie which he had purchased in 1636), was knighted and given a pension of £200 a year. The same month the parliament appointed him a commissioner at Westminster for settling the affairs of Scotland.

Lord Warriston was a chief agent in concluding the treaty with the English parliament in the autumn of 1643, and was appointed a member of the Committee of Both Kingdoms in London which directed the military operations, and in this capacity went on several missions to the parliamentary generals. The articles of the unsuccessful Treaty of Uxbridge were, for the most part, drawn up by him in late 1644. He took his seat early the same year in the Westminster Assembly, to which he had been nominated, and vehemently opposed measures tolerating independency.

Besides his public duties in England Warriston sat in the Scottish parliament for the county of Edinburgh from 1643 until 1647, and served on various committees. After the final defeat of Charles, when he had surrendered himself to the Scots, Johnston was made king's advocate in October 1646, and the same year was voted £3000 by the Scottish estates for his services. He continued to oppose concessions to Charles and strongly disapproved of the Engagement concluded in 1648 by the government of the Duke of Hamilton with Charles at Carisbrooke, which, while securing little for Presbyterianism, committed the Scots to hostilities with the English Parliament and the New Model Army.

== The Remonstrants ==
Warriston now became one of the leaders of the Kirk Party opposed to the Engagement, and during the ascendancy of the Engagers retired to Kintyre as the guest of the Marquess of Argyll. He returned again after the Whiggamore Raid, met Cromwell at Edinburgh in October after the defeat of the Engagers at Preston, and in conjunction with Argyll promoted the Act of Classes, passed on 23 January 1649, disqualifying royalists from holding public office. The good relations now formed with Cromwell were soon broken, however, by the King's execution, and Warriston was present officially at the proclamation of Charles II as King at Edinburgh, on 5 February 1649.

On 10 March 1649 Warriston was appointed Lord Clerk Register. In May he pronounced the sentence of death on Montrose and is said to have witnessed along with Argyll the victim being drawn to the place of execution. He was present at the battle of Dunbar (3 September 1650) as a member of the Committee of Estates. After the defeat he urged the removal of General Leslie, afterwards Lord Newark, from the command of the Scottish army, and on 21 September delivered a violent speech in Charles' presence, attributing all the late misfortunes to the Stuarts and their opposition to the Reformation.

After Dunbar the Committee of Estates persuaded the General Assembly of the Church of Scotland that it was necessary to abandon the Act of Classes to allow a new national army to be raised, to include supporters of the Engagement and other royalists. A resolution to this effect was immediately drawn up. Warriston, along with some of the more implacable Presbyterians, drew up a Remonstrance or Protest against this move. The Act of Classes was duly abandoned, but the division between the majority Resolutioners and the minority Protestors was to haunt the Church of Scotland for decades after.

In the autumn of 1656 Warriston went to London as representative of the Remonstrants; and soon afterwards, on 9 July 1657, he was restored by Cromwell to his office of Lord Clerk Register, and on 3 November was appointed a commissioner for the administration of justice in Scotland, henceforth remaining a member of the government until the Restoration. In January 1658 he was included by Cromwell in his new House of Lords and sat also in the upper chamber in Richard Cromwell's parliament. Upon the latter's abdication and the restoration of the Rump, he was chosen a member of the Council of State and continued in the administration as a member of the Committee of Public Safety.

== The Restoration ==
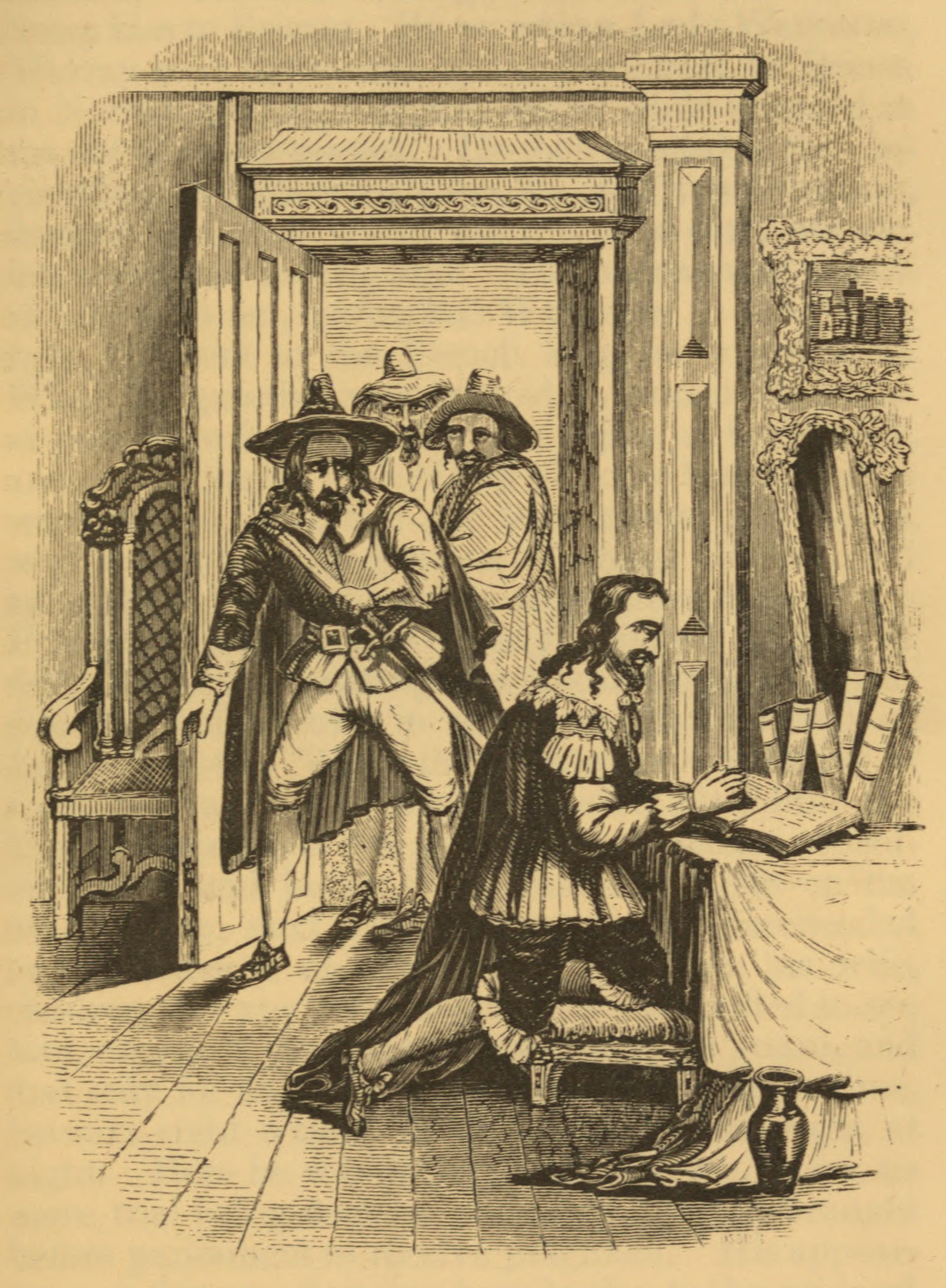
Archibald Johnston captured

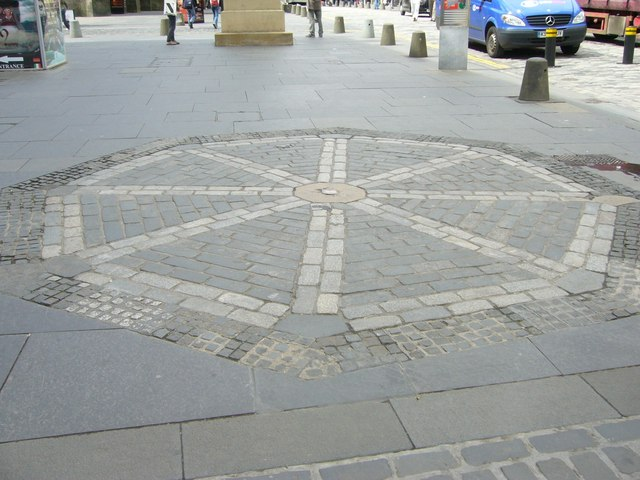
Warriston was hanged at the Mercat Cross in Edinburgh, now marked by these pavement setts.

Johnston lived in a mansion house at the foot of Warriston Close in Edinburgh (so named in his honour) on its east side, which had previously been home to Sir Lewis Craig.

At the Restoration Warriston was excluded from the general pardon. On 1 February 1661 he was summoned along with John Home of Kello, William Dundas of Magdalens and others to appear before Parliament on a charge of high treason. He had already fled to Holland and thence to Hamburg in Germany, so he was condemned to death (and stripped of his properties and title) in absentia on 15 May 1661.

In 1663, having ventured into France, he was discovered at Rouen, and with the consent of Louis XIV was brought to England and imprisoned in the Tower of London. In June he was taken to Edinburgh and confined in the Tolbooth. He was hanged on 22 July at the Mercat Cross, Edinburgh, the scene of many of his triumphs, and around 100 yards from his own house off the High Street. His severed head was displayed on the Netherbow (town gate) and afterwards buried with his body in Greyfriars Kirkyard.

== Character and political views ==
Johnston was a man of great energy, industry and ability, and played a large part in the defence of the Presbyterian settlement of 1638. He is described by his contemporary Robert Baillie as “one of the most faithful and diligent and able servants that our church and kingdom has had all the tymes of our troubles.” He was learned in Scottish law, eloquent and deeply religious. His passionate devotion to the cause of the Scottish church was seen by his critics as fanaticism. According to the History by his nephew Gilbert Burnet, he looked on the Covenant as setting Christ on his throne.

Johnston had by nature no republican leanings; all the Royalists in Scotland, wrote Robert Baillie as late as 1646, could not have pleaded so much for the Crown and the King's just power as the Chancellor and Warriston did for many days together. When, however, Presbyterianism was attacked and menaced by the Sovereign, he desired, like John Pym, to restrict the royal prerogative by a parliamentary constitution, and endeavoured to found his arguments on law and ancient precedents.

Johnston's acceptance of office under Cromwell hardly deserves the severe censure it has received. In both politics and religion he stood nearer to Cromwell than the royalists, and was able to offer useful service in office. Johnston was wanting in tact and in consideration for his opponents, confessing himself that his natural temper (or rather distemper) "hath been hasty and passionate".

He was disliked by Charles I and hated by Charles II, whom he rebuked for lack of commitment to the Covenants; but he was associated in private friendship and public life with Argyll.

== Family ==
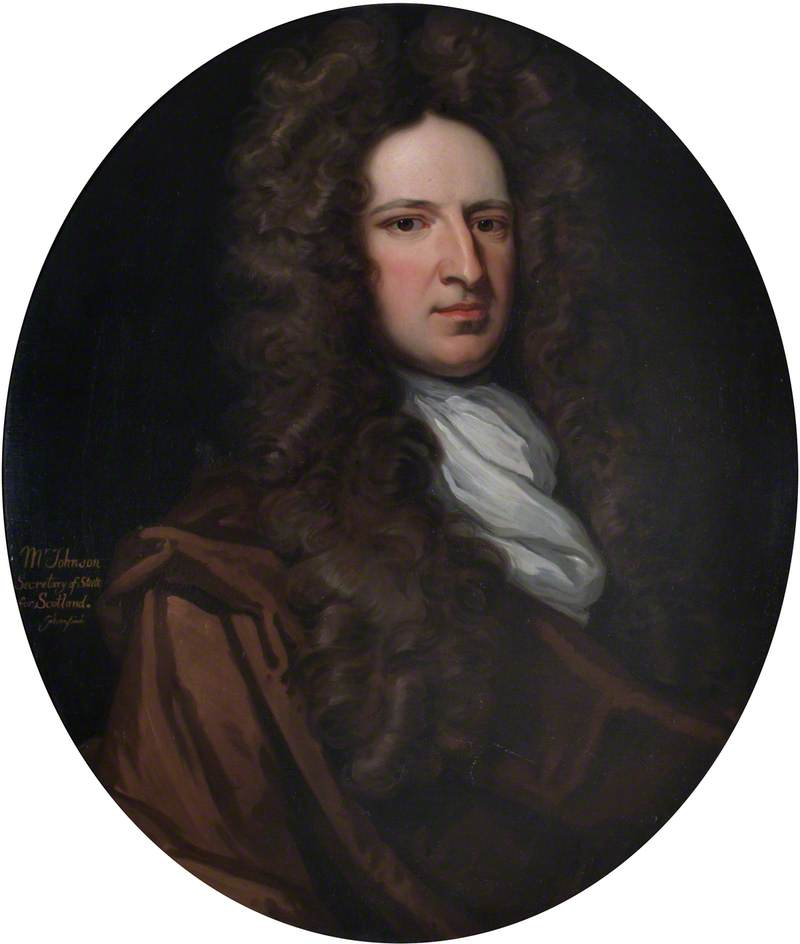
James Johnson

He had a large family, the most famous of his sons being James Johnston (1643–1737), known as Secretary Johnston. Having taken refuge in Holland after his father's execution, Johnston crossed over to England in the interests of William of Orange just before the Glorious Revolution of 1688. In 1692 he was appointed one of the secretaries for Scotland, but he was dismissed from office in 1696. Under Queen Anne, however, he began again to take part in public affairs, and was made Lord Clerk Register. Johnston's later years were passed mainly at his residence (much later known as Orleans House) Twickenham, and he died at Bath in May 1737 (see separate article).

Legal offices
Preceded by Sir Thomas Hope, 1st Baronet	Lord Advocate; 16??–16??	Succeeded by Sir Thomas Nicolson
