= Sir James Foulis, 2nd Baronet =

Scottish politician and judge

Sir James Foulis, Lord Colinton (died 1688), was a Scottish politician and judge.

== Life ==
James Foulis was the only son of Alexander Foulis of Colinton and his wife Elizabeth, daughter of Robert Hepburn of Ford (near Pathhead, Midlothian). She was the widow of Sir John Stuart, sheriff of Bute. His father was created a baronet of Nova Scotia 7 June 1634.

Foulis was knighted by Charles I 14 November 1641, and represented Edinburgh in parliament in 1645–1948 and in 1651. He was a commissioner to enforce the acts against runaways and deficients in 1644, and a member of the committee of estates in 1646–1947. He adopted the royalist cause, was taken prisoner at Alyth by a detachment of George Monck's force, then besieging Dundee, 28 September 1651, and was imprisoned for his royalist opinions. After the Restoration he became an ordinary lord of session (14 February), and a commissioner of excise in 1661. He was commissioner to parliament for Edinburghshire from 1661 to 1681, and a lord of the articles in each parliament from the Restoration.

When the High Court of Justiciary was constituted in February 1671 he became a lord commissioner, and took his seat in Parliament and the oaths in 1672, having the title of Lord Colinton. He was sworn of the Privy Council of Scotland in 1674, and was a commissioner for the plantation of kirks in 1678. On 12 December 1681, at the trial of Archibald Campbell, 9th Earl of Argyll, he voted, old cavalier though he was, against the relevancy of the indictment, and it was only carried by Lord Nairne's casting vote.

On 22 February 1684 Foulis was appointed lord justice clerk in succession to Sir Richard Maitland, and died at Edinburgh 19 January 1688.

== Family ==
Foulis was twice married, secondly to Dame Margaret Erskine, Lady Tarbet, daughter of Sir George Erskine of Innertail. He had a son James, who succeeded to the title, and was a member of parliament; and a daughter, who married James Livingstone.

Baronetage of Nova Scotia
Preceded by Alexander Foulis	Baronet (of Colinton) c.1670–1688	Succeeded by James Foulis
