= Sir James Foulis, 7th Baronet =

Sir James Foulis, 7th Baronet (1770–1842), of Woodhall, was the seventh Baronet of Colinton.

Foulis, born 9 September 1770, was the great-grandson of William Foulis of Woodhall, second son of Sir John Foulis, first Baronet of Ravelston, by Margaret, daughter of Sir Archibald Primrose of Carrington. Foulis had a fine taste for the arts, and was both a painter and a sculptor. In the council-room of Gillespie's Hospital, Edinburgh, is a portrait of the founder by Sir James. He married in 1810 to Agnes, daughter of John Grieve Esq of Ramsay-Garden, by whom he had two sons and two daughters.

Foulis died in April 1842, and was succeeded by his elder son, Sir William Liston Foulis, who became eighth Baronet, and the representative of the three houses of Colinton, Woodhall, and Ravelston. He married first a daughter of Captain Ramage Liston, R.N., and grandniece and heiress of the Right Hon. Sir Robert Liston, G.C.B., ambassador to Turkey. By this lady he had two sons and one daughter. He married, secondly, the eldest daughter of Robert Cadell. The eighth Baronet died in 1858, and was succeeded by his elder son, Sir James, born in 1847.

Baronetage of Nova Scotia
| Preceded by James Foulis | Baronet (of Colinton); 1825–1842 | Succeeded by William Liston-Foulis |
