= Edinburghshire (Parliament of Scotland constituency) =

Constituency of the Old Parliament of Scotland

Before the Acts of Union 1707, the barons of the sheriffdom of Edinburgh (also called "Edinburgh principal" to distinguish it from "Edinburgh within the constabulary of Haddington", and now known as Midlothian) elected commissioners to represent them in the Parliament of Scotland and in the Convention of the Estates. The number of commissioners was increased from two to four in 1690.

After the Union, Edinburghshire returned one Member of Parliament to the House of Commons of Great Britain and later to the House of Commons of the United Kingdom.

== List of shire commissioners ==
- 1594: James Foulis of Colinton

Parliament or Convention	Commissioners			
Parliament; 12–13 October 1612	Sir James Foulis of Colinton		Sir James Dundas of Arniston	
Convention; 7 March 1617	Sir George Ramsay of Dalhousie		James Richardson of Smeton	
Parliament; 27 May–28 June 1617	Sir George Ramsay of Dalhousie		James Richardson of Smeton	
Convention; 25–26 January 1621	none			
Parliament; 1 June–4 August 1621	Sir Alexander Lauder of Haltoun		David Crichton of Lugton	
Convention; 27 October–2 November 1625	Sir George Forrester of Corstorphine		Sir James Dundas of Arniston	
Parliament; 15 September 1628 – 28 June 1633	Sir George Forrester of Corstorphine		Patrick Hamilton of Little Preston	
Convention; 28 July–7 August 1630	Sir James Makgill of Cranstoun Riddell		James Richardson of Smeton	
Parliament; 15 May 1639 – 17 November 1641	Sir David Crichton of Lugton		Sir John Wauchope of Niddrie	
Convention; 22 June 1643 – 3 June 1644	Sir Archibald Johnston of Warriston		George Winram of Liberton	
Convention; 22 June 1643 – 3 June 1644	Sir Patrick Hamilton of Preston (from 10 April 1644)		Sir John Wauchope of Niddrie (from 10 April 1644)	
Parliament; 4 June 1644 – 27 March 1647	Sir Archibald Johnston of Warriston		Sir Patrick Hamilton of Preston	
Parliament; 4 June 1644 – 27 March 1647	Sir Archibald Johnston of Warriston		George Winram of Liberton (from 7 January 1645)	
Parliament; 4 June 1644 – 27 March 1647	Sir Archibald Johnston of Warriston		Sir James Foulis of Colinton (from 26 November 1645)	
Parliament; 2 March 1648 – 6 June 1651	Sir James Foulis of Colinton		Sir James Dundas of Arniston	
Parliament; 2 March 1648 – 6 June 1651	Sir Archibald Johnston of Warriston (from 4 January 1649)		George Winram of Liberton (from 4 January 1649)	
Parliament; 2 March 1648 – 6 June 1651	Sir John Wauchope of Niddrie		George Winram of Liberton (from 4 January 1649)	
Parliament; 2 March 1648 – 6 June 1651	Sir James Foulis of Colinton (from 1651)		Sir John Wauchope of Niddrie	Sir William Scott of Clerkington (from 1651)
During the Commonwealth of England, Scotland and Ireland, the sheriffdom of Midlothian was represented by one Member of Parliament in the Protectorate Parliament at Westminster.
Parliament; 3 September 1654 – 22 January 1655	George Smith			
Parliament; 17 September 1656 – 4 February 1658	Samuel Desborough			
Parliament; 27 January–22 April 1659	Samuel Desborough			
After the Restoration, the Parliament of Scotland was again summoned to meet in Edinburgh.
Parliament; 1 January 1661 – 9 October 1663	Sir James Foulis of Colinton		Sir John Gilmour of Craigmillar	
Convention; 2–4 August 1665	Sir John Gilmour of Craigmillar		Sir James Foulis of Colinton	
Convention; 9–23 January 1667	Sir John Gilmour of Craigmillar		Sir James Foulis of Colinton	
Parliament; 19 October 1669 – 3 March 1674	Sir John Gilmour of Craigmillar		Charles Maitland of Haltoun	
Parliament; 19 October 1669 – 3 March 1674	New commission 16 January 1672, to replace Gilmour (deceased) and Maitland (appointed Treasurer-Depute)			
Parliament; 19 October 1669 – 3 March 1674	Sir James Foulis of Colinton		Sir John Nicolson of that Ilk	
Convention; 26 June–11 July 1678	Sir James Foulis of Colinton		Richard Maitland of Gogar	
Parliament; 28 July 1681 – 1 March 1682	Sir James Foulis of Colinton		Sir John Couper of Gogar	
Parliament; 23 April 1685 – 15 June 1686	Sir James Foulis of Redford, later of Colinton		Sir John Maitland of Ravelrig	
Convention; 14 March–24 May 1689	Sir James Foulis of Redford, later of Colinton		Sir John Maitland of Ravelrig	
Parliament; 5 June 1689 – 30 June 1702	Sir James Foulis of Redford, later of Colinton		Sir John Maitland of Ravelrig	
Parliament; 5 June 1689 – 30 June 1702	By Act of Parliament 14 June 1690, the shire of Edinburgh was allocated two additional Commissioners.			
Parliament; 5 June 1689 – 30 June 1702	Sir James Foulis of Colinton (seat declared vacant 25 April 1693)	Sir John Maitland of Ravelrig, later (1693) Lauder of Haltoun (succeeded as Earl of Lauderdale in 1695)	Sir Alexander Gilmour of Craigmillar	Sir John Clerk of Pennycuik
Parliament; 5 June 1689 – 30 June 1702	Robert Craig of Riccarton	Sir John Maitland of Ravelrig, later (1693) Lauder of Haltoun (succeeded as Earl of Lauderdale in 1695)	Sir Alexander Gilmour of Craigmillar	Sir John Clerk of Pennycuik
Parliament; 5 June 1689 – 30 June 1702	Robert Craig of Riccarton	Archibald Primrose of Dalmeny (created Viscount of Rosebery in 1700)	Sir Alexander Gilmour of Craigmillar	Sir John Clerk of Pennycuik
Parliament; 5 June 1689 – 30 June 1702	Robert Craig of Riccarton	Robert Dundas of Arniston	Sir Alexander Gilmour of Craigmillar	Sir John Clerk of Pennycuik
Parliament; 12 November 1702 – 25 March 1707	Robert Dundas of Arniston	Sir James Primrose of Carrington (created Viscount of Primrose in 1703)	Sir Robert Dickson of Inveresk	George Lockhart of Carnwath
Parliament; 12 November 1702 – 25 March 1707	Robert Dundas of Arniston	Sir James Foulis of Colinton	Sir Robert Dickson of Inveresk	George Lockhart of Carnwath

== Sources ==
- Return of Members of Parliament (1878), Part II.
- Joseph Foster, Members of Parliament, Scotland (1882).
- The Records of the Parliaments of Scotland.

== See also ==
- List of constituencies in the Parliament of Scotland at the time of the Union
