= Sir Robert Dickson, 1st Baronet =

Scottish MP and baronet

Arms of Dickson of Sornbeg

Sir Robert Dickson (died October 1711), first holder of the baronetcy of Dickson of Sornbeg, was a shire commissioner of the Parliament of Scotland for the constituency of Edinburghshire from 1702 to 1707, who voted for the Union.

He was the son of Alexander Dickson of Tourlands. He was created a baronet of Nova Scotia on 28 February 1695 when he was described as being of Sornbeg in Galston, Ayrshire, but later acquired a large estate in Inveresk.

He was succeeded as second baronet by his son Robert (1694–1760) whose only son predeceased him, so the title presumably became extinct on his death.

A couple of publications however announced in 1760 that a David Dickson "of Derrymore, King's County", Ireland, had succeeded to the baronetcy. No such person is known to be connected to the family and there is no further trace either of the man or the title. Nevertheless, for this reason the baronetcy of Dickson of Sornbeg is sometimes described as dormant rather than extinct.
