= John Maitland, 5th Earl of Lauderdale =

Scottish judge and politician

John Maitland (later Lauder), 5th Earl of Lauderdale (1655 – 30 August 1710, both at Haltoun House, Ratho, Midlothian, Scotland) was a Scottish judge and politician who supported the Acts of Union.

== Biography ==
Maitland was the second son of Charles Maitland, 3rd Earl of Lauderdale, and succeeded his elder brother Richard Maitland, 4th Earl of Lauderdale in the Earldom in 1695.

On 8 July 1691 he had a charter of the Barony of Haltoun and by that was obliged to assume the surname and designation of Lauder of Haltoun in lieu of Maitland of Ravelrig. Foster is unclear on dates but says that he definitely assumed the designation of John Lauder of Haltoun in lieu of Maitland of Ravelrig.

On 30 July 1680 he was admitted to the Faculty of Advocates, and on 16 November 1680 he was created a Baronet of Nova Scotia. He was appointed an Ordinary Lord of Session, and Senator of the College of Justice under the title of Lord Ravelrig, on 28 October 1689. He was also "heritor" of Currie parish.

He is recorded as Member of Parliament for Edinburghshire from 12 March 1685 to 1686 and was on the Convention in 1689, all as Sir John Lauder of Haltoun, and again in parliament from 1689 to 1693 as Sir John Maitland of Ravelrig. He was appointed a Privy Counsellor 16 April 1679. He concurred in the 1688 revolution. When he took his seat in parliament on 8 September 1696, he supported the Union of parliaments.

About 1690 he was appointed Colonel of the Edinburghshire Militia, and was General of The Mint in 1699.

== Family ==
About 1680, Sir John married Lady Margaret (c.1662–1742), daughter of Alexander Cunningham, 10th Earl of Glencairn by whom he had three sons and a daughter. His daughter Elizabeth married James Carmichael, 2nd Earl of Hyndford, and his son and heir was Charles Maitland, 6th Earl of Lauderdale, (1688–1744) who married Elizabeth Ogilvy. She became 'Countess of Lauderdale' upon their marriage on the 15th of July 1710, Banffshire, Scotland. Elizabeth was the daughter of James Ogilvy, '4th Earl of Findlater', and Ann Dunbar.

Peerage of Scotland
Preceded by Richard Maitland	Earl of Lauderdale; 1695–1710	Succeeded by Charles Maitland
Baronetage of Nova Scotia
New creation	Baronet (of Ravelrig); 1680–1710	Succeeded by Charles Maitland
