= Sir John Clerk, 1st Baronet =

Scottish politician

Sir John Clerk of Penicuik, 1st Baronet (died 1722) was a Scottish politician, created a Baronet of Nova Scotia on 24 March 1679.

Sir John was the eldest son of John Clerk of Penicuik and Mary, daughter of Sir William Gray of Pittendrum.

From 1690 until 1702 he was MP for Edinburghshire (Lothian) in the Scottish Parliament.

In 1700, he acquired the lands and barony of Leswade, near Edinburgh. He served as a shire commissioner in the Parliament of Scotland for Edinburghshire from 1690 to 1702.

He married twice. With his first wife, Elizabeth, daughter of Henry Henderson, of Elrington, he had three sons and three daughters including Barbara. His son-in-law, Barbara's second husband, Dr. William Arthur, became embroiled in the Jacobite rising of 1715. With his second wife, Christian, daughter of the Reverend James Kilpatrick, he had four sons and four daughters. He died in 1722, and was succeeded by his eldest son Sir John Clerk, 2nd Baronet.

== See also ==
- Clerk baronets

== Notes ==
Baronetage of Nova Scotia
New creation	Baronet (of Penicuik); 1679–1722	Succeeded by John Clerk
