= Sir James Foulis, 3rd Baronet =

Scottish judge and politician

James Foulis of Colinton, Lord Retfurd or Redford (c. 1645–1711), was a Scottish judge and politician. He was one of the main investors in the Company of Scotland and their Darien Expedition.

== Life ==
Foulis was born around 1645 at Colinton Castle, the eldest son of Sir James Foulis, Lord Colinton, whom he succeeded as third Baronet in 1688. His mother was Barbara Ainslie daughter of Andrew Ainslie.

His father 'bestowed liberally' upon his education. He studied Law at University of Leyden, and was admitted as an advocate on 8 June 1669. He was appointed lord of session November 1674, when he took the courtesy title of Lord Reidfurd. The name Redford links to Redford House which was built is south Colinton around 1670.

Foulis was elected commissioner for Edinburghshire on 20 January 1685, was a supporter of the extreme measures of the government, but continued to sit after The Glorious Revolution, 'until his seat was declared vacant, 25 April 1693, because he had not taken the oath of allegiance and signed the assurance'.

He was an investor in the New Mills cloth manufactury in Haddingtonshire and one of the founders of the "Company of Scotland Trading with Africa and the Indies" generally known as the Company of Scotland. In November 1695, he was made responsible for collecting subscriptions from investors. Although the terms of its foundation limited personal investment to £3,000 the simple maths of the 30 founders raising £400,000 means that the individual investment amounted to an average of £35,000 (£4 million in modern terms). This money was used to fund the ill-fortuned Darien Scheme to establish a Scottish trading colony on the isthmus of Panama. By 1699 the colonists had perished or dispersed and the investors had lost everything.

After the death of William III & II Foulis was made colonel of the Midlothian militia, and sworn of the privy council (1703). From 1704 until 1707 (the Act of Union) he represented Edinburghshire in the Scottish Parliament.

Although publicly he spoke in opposition to the Union of 1707, under the terms of the Act, he, and the fellow stockholders of the Company of Scotland were all fully "compensated" for their losses. This included "interest" on the failed investment. This is viewed by most historians as a bribe by the English parliament, as they (the English parliament) bore no responsibility whatsoever for the losses. Foulis's receipt in 1707 would be around £40,000 (around £5 million in modern terms). It would probably be very difficult for Foulis to be "against the Union" under these circumstances.

Although Foulis was not a signatory to the Act of Union (as several members of the Company of Scotland were) as a commissioner representing Edinburgh alongside Sir Patrick Johnston, Lord Provost of Edinburgh, they were responsible for setting up the terms for the Act of Union, including their personal "compensation" (Johnston was also in the company and was signatory to the Act).

Colinton Castle remained in the hands of the Foulis family until 1800 when it was bought by William Forbes of Pitsligo as his Edinburgh residence. The site became Merchiston Castle School in the 20th century.

The name Redford (a second house in the grounds of Colinton Castle) is preserved in the names Redford Road and Redford Barracks.

== Family ==
Foulis married Margaret, daughter of John Boyd, Dean of Guild, Edinburgh, by whom he had several children. On his death, in 1711, he was succeeded in the baronetcy by his eldest son James, with whom he is sometimes confounded—e.g. by Anderson. Foulis was engaged in a complex lawsuit with Dame Margaret Erskine, Lady Castlehaven, his stepmother, as to her interest in his father's estates. The chief papers were published, with notes by him, or compiled under his direction, and exhibit some details as to Scotch aristocratic life and customs of the period ('An Exact and Faithful relation of the Process pursued by Dame Margaret Areskine, Lady Castlehaven, against Sir James Foulis, now of Collingtoun,' Edinburgh, 1690). Among the Lauderdale MSS. are various official reports and addresses to Charles II and the Duke of Lauderdale, to which the signature of Foulis is appended.

Baronetage of Nova Scotia
| Preceded by James Foulis | Baronet (of Colinton); 1688–1711 | Succeeded by James Foulis |
