= Robert Dundas, Lord Arniston =

Scottish politician and ordinary lord of session

Robert, 2nd Lord Arniston Dundas
- Born: 1650
- Died: 1726 (aged 75–76)
- Occupation: Scottish judge
- Spouse: Margaret Sinclair
- Children: 4 daughters, 6 sons, including Robert
- Parent(s): James Dundas, Lord Arniston; Marion Boyd

Robert Dundas, Lord Arniston (1650–1726) was a Scottish politician and ordinary lord of session.

== Life ==
He was the eldest son of Sir James Dundas, Lord Arniston, by Marion, daughter of Robert, Lord Boyd. He was educated abroad, but returned to Scotland as an adherent of the Prince of Orange, and represented Midlothian in the parliaments of 1700–2 and 1702–7.

He was appointed an ordinary lord of session, on 1 November 1689, assuming the title of Lord Arniston, and sat on the bench for thirty years. He was fond of retirement and study. Guarini's Pastor Fido was among his favourite books.

By his wife Margaret, daughter of Sir Robert Sinclair of Stevenson, he had four daughters and six sons, of whom the second, Robert Dundas the elder, became lord president of the court of session. Dundas died on 25 November 1726. His place as Senator of the College of Justice was filled by Hew Dalrymple, Lord Drummore.
