= Foulis baronets =

Extinct baronetcy in the Baronetage of England

There have been three baronetcies created for persons with the surname Foulis, one in the Baronetage of England and two in the Baronetage of Nova Scotia.

The Foulis baronetcy, of Ingleby in the County of York, was created in the Baronetage of England on 6 February 1620 for David Foulis. The third Baronet sat as Member of Parliament for Northallerton. The title became extinct on the death of the ninth Baronet in 1876.

The Foulis (later Liston-Foulis) baronetcy, of Colinton near Edinburgh, was created in the Baronetage of Nova Scotia on 7 June 1634 for Alexander Foulis, with remainder to heirs male whatsoever. The second Baronet was a Member of the Scottish Parliament for Midlothian and served as Lord Justice Clerk with the judicial title of Lord Colinton. The third Baronet sat in the last Scottish Parliament and then represented Midlothian in the British House of Commons. He was also a Lord of Session and member of the Scottish Privy Council. On the death of the sixth Baronet in 1825 the male line of the first Baronet and his father died out. The late Baronet was succeeded by his distant cousin, the seventh Baronet, a descendant of George Foulis, of Ravelstoun, uncle of the first Baronet (see also the 1661 creation below). The eighth Baronet married Henrietta, great-niece and testamentary heir of the noted diplomat Sir Robert Liston, and assumed the additional surname of Liston. The thirteenth Baronet discontinued the use of the surname of Liston in 1988 by decree of the Lord Lyon. The title became extinct on his death in 2006. The family surname is pronounced "Fowls".

The Foulis (later Primrose) baronetcy, of Ravelstoun near Edinburgh, was created in the Baronetage of Nova Scotia on 15 October 1661 for John Foulis. He was the son of the aforementioned George Foulis, of Ravelstoun, uncle of the first Baronet of the 1634 creation. The second Baronet assumed the surname of Primrose. He took part in the Jacobite rising of 1745, was attainted, condemned to death for treason and executed at Carlisle. The baronetcy was forfeited. From 1825 to 2006 the baronet of Colinton (see above) was also the baronet of Ravelstoun but for the attainder.

== Foulis baronets, of Ingleby (1620) ==
- Sir David Foulis, 1st Baronet (died 1642)
- Sir Henry Foulis, 2nd Baronet (c. 1607–1643)
- Sir David Foulis, 3rd Baronet (1633–1695)
- Sir William Foulis, 4th Baronet (1659–1741)
- Sir William Foulis, 5th Baronet (c. 1680–1756)
- Sir William Foulis, 6th Baronet (1729–1780)
- Sir William Foulis, 7th Baronet (1759–1802)
- Sir William Foulis, 8th Baronet (1790–1845)
- Sir Henry Foulis, 9th Baronet (1800–1876)

== Foulis (later Liston-Foulis) baronets, of Colinton (1634) ==
Escutcheon of the Foulis baronets of Ingleby and of Colinton

- Sir Alexander Foulis, 1st Baronet (died c. 1670)
- Sir James Foulis, 2nd Baronet (died 1688)
- Sir James Foulis, 3rd Baronet (died 1711)
- Sir James Foulis, 4th Baronet (died 1742)
- Sir James Foulis, 5th Baronet (died 1791)
- Sir James Foulis, 6th Baronet (died 1825)
- Sir James Foulis, 7th Baronet (1770–1842)
- Sir William Liston-Foulis, 8th Baronet (1812–1858)
- Sir James Liston-Foulis, 9th Baronet (1847–1895)
- Sir William Liston-Foulis, 10th Baronet (1869–1918)
- Sir Charles James Liston-Foulis, 11th Baronet (1873–1936)
- Sir Archibald Charles Liston-Foulis, 12th Baronet (1903–1961)
- Sir Ian Primrose Liston Foulis, 13th Baronet (1937–2006)

== Foulis (later Primrose) baronets, of Ravelstoun (1661) ==
- Sir John Foulis, 1st Baronet (1638–1707)
- Sir Archibald Primrose, 2nd Baronet (c. 1692–1746)
