= Lockhart (surname) =

Lockhart is a surname of Scottish origin.

== People with the surname ==
- Anne Lockhart (actress) (born 1953), US actress
- Austelle Lockhart, Dominica politician
- Beatriz Lockhart (1944–2015), Uruguayan pianist, music educator and composer
- Bob Lockhart, Canadian politician
- Bob Lockhart (footballer) (1940–2010), Australian footballer
- Calvin Lockhart (1934–2007), Bahamian–American actor
- Carla Lockhart (born 1985), British Member of Parliament
- Charles Lockhart (disambiguation), various people
- Chekira Lockhart Hypolite, Dominican politician
- Dennis P. Lockhart (born 1947), American businessman and economist
- E. Lockhart (born 1967), pen name for American writer Emily Jenkins
- Eugenia Lockhart (fl. 1908–1960), Bahamian suffragette
- Frank P. Lockhart, (1881–1949), US diplomat
- Frank Lockhart (1903–1928), American automobile racing driver
- Gene Lockhart (1891–1957), Canadian character actor, singer and popular composer
- George Claude Lockhart (1885–1979), British circus ringmaster
- George William Lockhart (1849–1904), British elephant trainer
- Grace Annie Lockhart (1855–1916), the first woman in the British Empire to receive a bachelor's degree
- Hayden Lockhart (born 1938), the first American Air Force pilot to be shot down over North Vietnam, held as a prisoner of war for eight years
- Jackie Lockhart (born 1965), Scottish curler
- James Lockhart (disambiguation), various people, including:
  - J. B. Lockhart (1886–1969), Scottish mathematician
  - James Lockhart (historian) (1933–2014), American academic and historian, specialising in colonial Latin America
  - James Stewart Lockhart (1858–1937), British colonial official in Hong Kong and China
- Joe Lockhart (born 1959), US political aide
- John Gibson Lockhart (1794–1854), Scottish writer and editor
- June Lockhart (1925–2025), US actress
- Kathleen Lockhart (1894–1978), English stage actress
- Keith Lockhart (born 1959), American conductor
- Keith Lockhart (baseball) (born 1964), American baseball player
- Laurel Lockhart, American actress, known for Beyond Belief: Fact or Fiction
- Michael Lee Lockhart (1960–1997), American serial killer
- Norman Lockhart (footballer) (1924-1993), Northern Irish footballer
- Paul Lockhart (born 1956), NASA astronaut
- Paul D. Lockhart (born 1963), American historian
- R. H. Bruce Lockhart (1887–1970), journalist, author, secret agent, British diplomat and footballer
- General Sir Rob Lockhart (1893–1981), British general and Scouting notable
- Samuel Lockhart (1851–1933), British elephant trainer
- Sean Paul Lockhart (born 1986), American actor
- Seán Marty Lockhart (born 1976), Northern Irish Gaelic footballer
- Thomas Lockhart (MP) (1739–1775), Scottish lawyer and politician
- Thomas Lockhart (1935–2018), American politician, Republican member of the Wyoming House of Representatives since 2001
- Tommy Lockhart (1892–1979), American ice hockey administrator, founder of USA Hockey
- Wilfred Lockhart (1906–1991), Minister, Academic
- William Lockhart (disambiguation), various people
- William Ewart Lockhart (1846–1900), Scottish Victorian painter
- Clan Lockhart, a Lowland Scottish clan
  - Lockharts of Lee
    - Count James Lockhart (Scottish aristocrat) of Lee and Carnwath, Count Lockhart-Wisheart of the Holy Roman Empire
    - Sir Simon Lockhart (1300–1371), crusader knight and discoverer of the "Lee Penny"
    - Sir William Lockhart of Lee (1621–1675), Oliver Cromwell's ambassador at Paris
    - Sir George Lockhart (politician) of Lee (1673–1731), Scottish writer and politician
  - Sir William Lockhart of Tarbrax
  - Anne Lockhart of Tarbrax
  - Anne Lockhart, Countess of Aberdeen
  - George Lockhart of Tarbrax

== Fictional characters ==
- Abby Lockhart in ER
- Gilderoy Lockhart in Harry Potter and the Chamber of Secrets
- Bonnie Lockhart, Patrick Lockhart, Mimi Lockhart, and Conner Lockhart in Days of Our Lives
- Skye Lockhart Newman from The Young and the Restless
- Sally Lockhart in books by Philip Pullman
- Detective Chief Superintendent Tom Lockhart in the television series No Hiding Place
- Tifa Lockhart in the video game Final Fantasy VII
- Diane Lockhart in the television series The Good Wife
- Richard "Dickie" Lockhart in Carl Hiaasen's 1987 novel Double Whammy

== See also ==
- Lockhart (disambiguation)
- Lockheart
