= Clan Lockhart =

Lowland Scottish clan

- Crest: On a chapeau Gules furred Ermine a boar's head erased Argent, langued Gules
- Motto: Corda Serrata Pando (I open locked hearts - a pun on the clan name)

Profile
- Region: Lowlands
- District: Lanarkshire, Dumfriesshire, Edinburghshire, and Peeblesshire

Chief
- Ranald Lockhart of the Lee, 27th of the Lee, Baron of Carnwath, Braidwood, Walston, Dryden, Covington, Milntown, Westshield and Newholm
- Chief of the Name and Arms of Lockhart
- Historic seat: Lee Castle
Clan branches
Lockharts of Lee (chiefs)

Clan Lockhart is an ancient family from the Scottish Lowlands.

Taking their name from Locard or Lokart in early times, it changed with Symon Locard, 2nd of Lee in 1330.

The Lockharts were a powerful family, and certainly one of the most prominent families in lowland Scotland during the Middle Ages. The Lockharts gained vast territories throughout the Lowlands, in Lanarkshire, Dumfriesshire, Edinburghshire, and Peeblesshire. Although the Lockharts are a lowland family they are now recognised by the Lord Lyon as a clan.

== History ==
=== Origins ===
The name Lockhart was spelt Locard or Lokart in early times, The modern spelling (Lockhart) seems to have been introduced in 1330, and refers to the crusades.

The history of the Locards dates back to 1066, the family being among those that fought in the Norman Conquest of William the Conqueror. The Locards like many other Scottish families came from England to Scotland after they had been dispossessed of lands by William the Conqueror. In the twelfth century there were Lockards near Penrith in the twelfth century and also in Annandale. In Annandale the town of Lockerbie is said to have been named after them. The chiefly family finally settled in Ayrshire, Dumfriesshire, Peeblesshire and Lanarkshire where they have held lands for over seven hundred years.

A charter of 1323 is the earliest paper in the family archives, in which Sir Symon Locard bound himself and his heirs to pay an annual rent of £10 out of the lands of Lee and Cartland, South Lanarkshire. (The exact date when the lands of Lee came into the family is not known, but 1272 is traditionally accepted.) Stephen Locard, grandfather of Sir Symon, founded the village of Stevenson in Ayrshire. His son Symon acquired the lands in Lanarkshire, and like his father, called a village which he founded, Symons Toun (today called Symington) after himself.

=== Wars of Scottish Independence and the Crusades ===
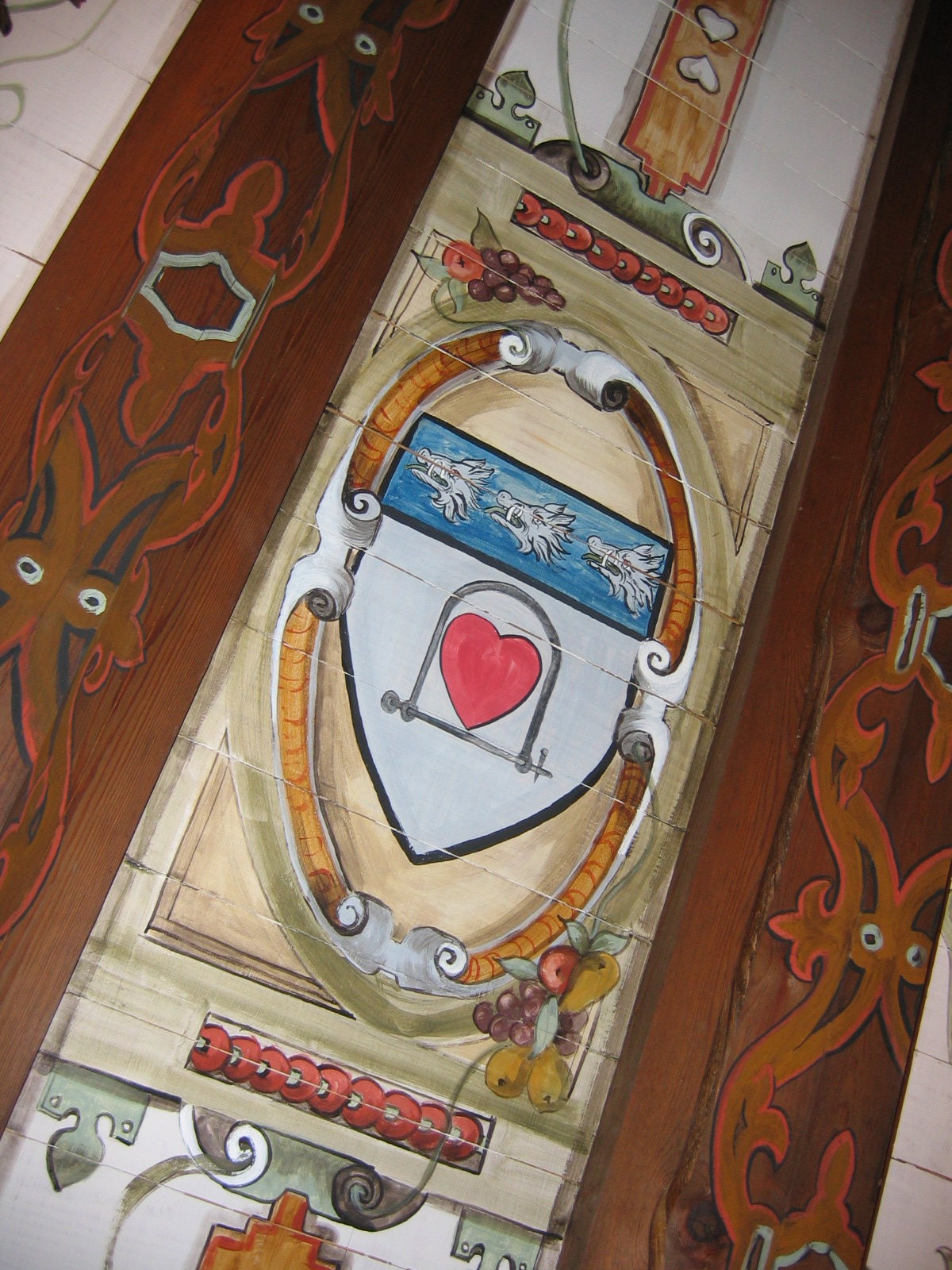
Ceiling painting of the Lockhart arms, Tower of Hallbar, South Lanarkshire, Scotland.

Symon Locard, 2nd of Lee, won fame for himself and his family in the Wars of Scottish Independence against the English when he fought alongside king Robert the Bruce and was knighted for his loyal service.

Sir Symon accompanied 'Good Sir James Douglas' of the Clan Douglas when they set out for the Holy Land where they set out to take the heart of Robert the Bruce. It was Sir Symon who carried the key to the locked silver casket in which the heart was carried. In Spain, James Douglas had been killed fighting the Moors and command of the Scottish Knights fell upon Symon Locard, he then rescued the silver casket and heart. Locard finding it impossible to go to Jerusalem returned to Scotland returning the heart of the king to the Abbey of Melrose and the bones of Sir James Douglas to St. Bride’s Kirk. To commemorate Sir Symon Locard's part in the crusade and the honour done to the family at some later date the name was changed to Lockheart and afterwards abbreviated to Lockhart. The king's heart within a fetterlock was from then on included in the family arms with the motto "Corda Serrata Pando" (I open locked hearts).

==== The Lee Penny ====
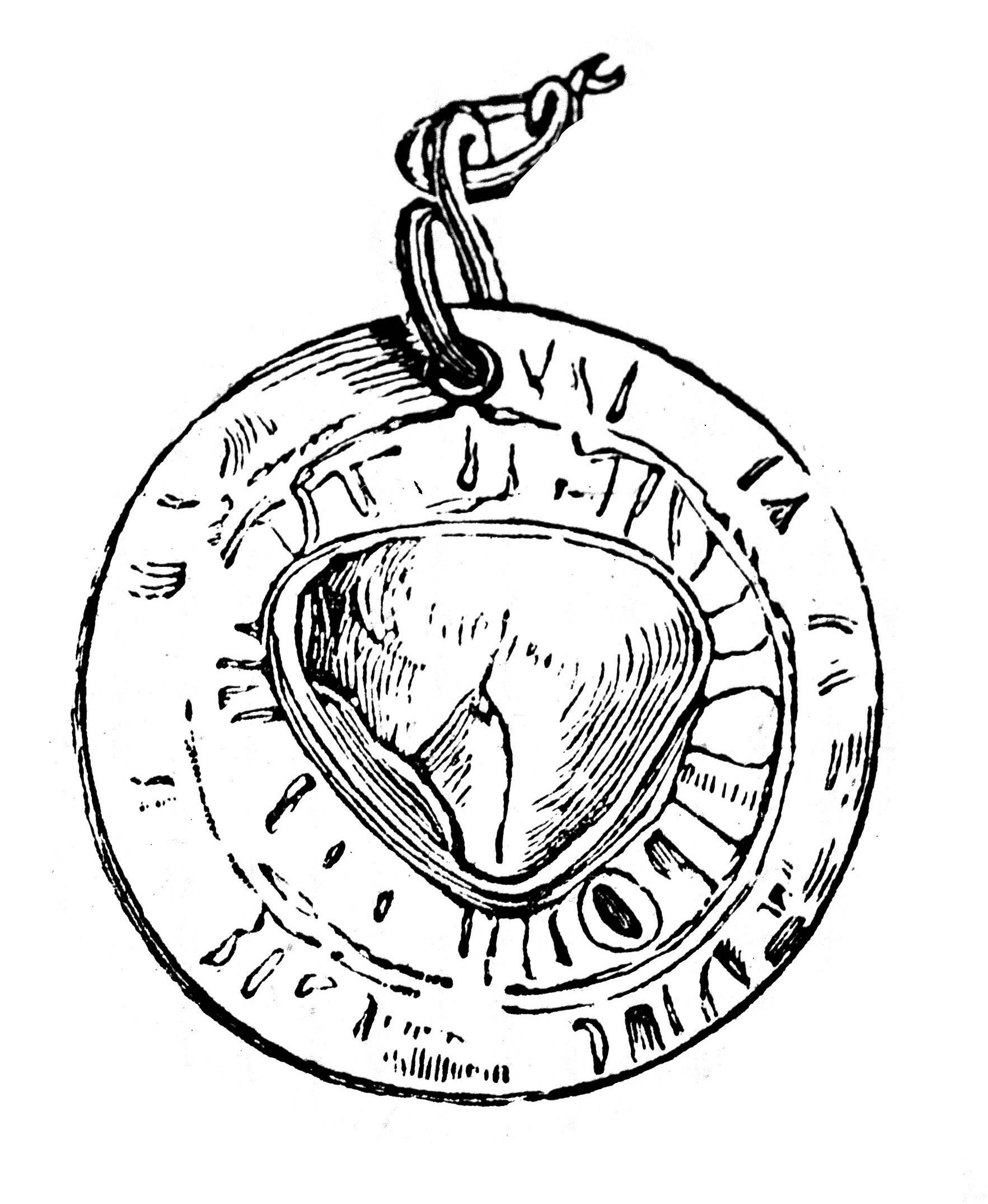
The Lee Penny

During the crusades of the 14th century the Lockharts brought back a precious heirloom. Sir Simon Lockhart captured a Moorish amir in battle and received from the man's mother as part of his ransom an amulet or stone with healing powers. The amir's mother told Sir Simon that the stone was a sovereign remedy against bleeding and fever, the bite of a mad dog, and sickness in horses and cattle.

The dark red stone was later set in a silver coin which has now been identified as a fourpenny piece from the reign of King Edward IV. The Lee Penny is kept in a gold snuffbox which was a gift from Maria Theresa of Austria, Empress of Austria to her general Count James Lockhart in 1789.

The fame of the Lee Penny spread through Scotland and Northern England and there are many recorded occasions when it was employed with apparent success. The coin was exempted from the Church of Scotland's prohibition on charms and was lent to the citizens of Newcastle during the reign of King Charles I to protect them from the plague. A sum of between £1000 and £6000 was pledged for its return. The penny gained further fame in the 19th century for inspiring Sir Walter Scott's 1825 novel The Talisman.

=== 16th and 17th centuries ===
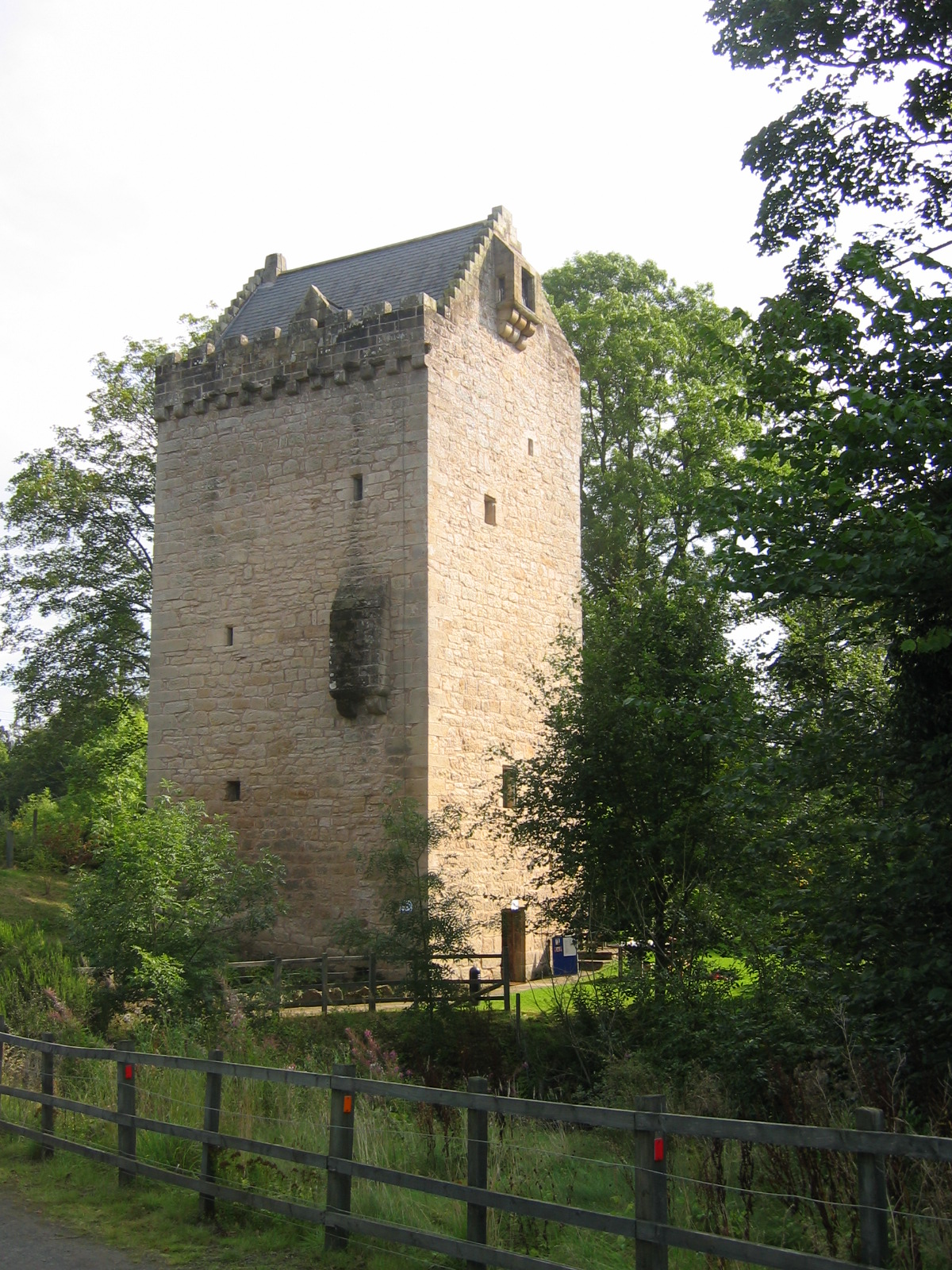
The Tower of Hallbar was purchased in 1681 by George Lockhart of Lee Castle, whose estate adjoined it.

In 1547 Alan Lockhart of Lee was killed at the Battle of Pinkie Cleugh. Sir James Lockhart of Lee (b.1594) was appointed by Charles I of England as a gentleman of the Privy Council and was knighted. He was also appointed to the Supreme Court Bench taking the title of Lord Lee.

==== Civil War ====
During the Wars of the Three Kingdoms he was a zealous royalist and was captured at Alyth in 1651. His son was Sir William Lockhart of Lee who was a distinguished soldier and fought at the Battle of Worcester as a royalist in 1651. However he later reconciled with Oliver Cromwell and married Cromwell's niece. As a result, he was not in favour with the Stuart monarchs when they were restored in 1660 and made his home in France. He later campaigned on the continent and Cardinal Mazarin offered to make him Marshal of France.

Sir George Lockhart (1630–1689) was the second son of Sir James Lockhart, Lord Lee, Lord Justice Clerk and became one of the most famous advocates at the Edinburgh Bar. He became Lord President of the Court of Session in 1685 and was M.P. for Lanarkshire in both the English and Scottish Parliaments. His knighthood was conferred in 1663 and the Carnwath and Dryden estates acquired by him in 1681. He was murdered on Easter Sunday 1689 on his way home from church by a dissatisfied litigant named Chiesly of Kersewell and Dalry.

=== 18th century and Jacobite risings ===
George Lockhart, Second of Carnwath (1673–1731) was a fervent Jacobite; he became Principal Agent to the exiled King James after the Jacobite rising of 1715. He was one of the Commissioners for the Treaty of Union, and the only one against it. He was one of the earliest of the agricultural improvers. He married Euphemia Montgomery, daughter of the ninth Earl of Eglinton; they had fourteen children. He died as the result of a duel.

James Lockhart inherited the estates in 1777 and saw service on the continent where he rose to become a count of the Order of Maria Theresa and a general of that empress's imperial forces.

== Chief ==
Following the death of his father Angus in 2015 the current chief is Ranald Lockhart of the Lee, 27th of the Lee, Chief of Clan Lockhart, Baron of Carnwath, Braidwood, Walston, Dryden, Covington, Milntown, Westshield and Newholm.

== Castles ==
- The seat of the Chief of the Clan Lockhart was at Lee Castle, but have since passed out of Lockhart hands.
- The Tower of Hallbar was purchased by George Lockhart of Lee Castle, in 1681.
- Craiglockhart Castle, a 13th century medieval keep associated with the Lockhart of Lee family. The family also owned the lands of Craiglockhart, which spanned east and west of Craiglockhart Hills (The castle sits on the west shoulder of the hill).

== Tartans ==
The usual tartan for the Lockhart's is a Green coloured pattern known as the Lockhart Tartan.

Tartan image	Notes
	Clan Lockhart tartan, This tartan was recorded prior to the launch of The Scottish Register of Tartans.

== See also ==
- Lockharts of Lee
- Scottish clan
- James Lockhart (Scottish aristocrat)
