= Lee Castle, South Lanarkshire =

Castle in South Lanarkshire, Scotland

Lee Castle
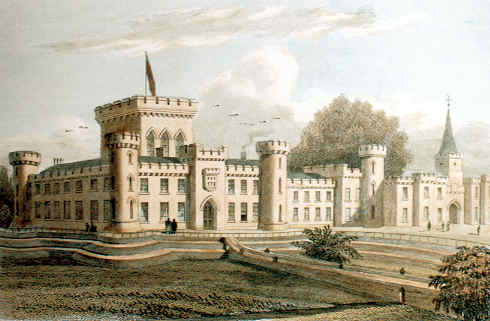
- Lee Castle drawn in 1830 by John Preston Neale

- Location in South Lanarkshire
- 55.6984°N 3.8247°W

Listed Building – Category B
- Designated: 12 January 1971
- Reference no.: LB13056

Inventory of Gardens and Designed Landscapes in Scotland
- Official name: Lee Castle
- Designated: 1 July 1987
- Reference no.: GDL00257

Lee Castle, also known as The Lee, is a castellated mansion in Auchenglen, a branch of the Clyde Valley in South Lanarkshire, Scotland. It is located 1.5 kilometres (0.93 mi) south of Braidwood, and 4 kilometres (2.5 mi) north-west of Lanark. Lee was the seat of the Lockharts of Lee from its establishment in the 13th century until 1919, though the present house is the result of rebuilding in the 19th century.

The house is protected as a category B listed building, and the grounds are included in the Inventory of Gardens and Designed Landscapes in Scotland, the national listing of significant gardens.

== History ==
In 1272, William Locard was granted the feudal barony of Lee. His son, Sir Simon Locard (1300–1371), fought in the Wars of Scottish Independence, and afterward accompanied Sir James Douglas in his attempt to carry the heart of Robert the Bruce to the Holy Land in 1330. Following the death of Sir James Douglas in battle with the Moors in Spain, Sir Simon carried the Bruce's heart back to Scotland for burial at Melrose Abbey. He is said to have subsequently added the heart and fetterlock to the family coat of arms. He also acquired the "Lee Penny", an amulet or touch piece said to have healing properties, and which remains in the family's possession.

Sir William Lockhart of Lee (1621–1675) fought for the Royalist cause in the English Civil War, but switched sides, and later married the niece of Oliver Cromwell. Lockhart was appointed Cromwell's commissioner for the administration of justice in Scotland, in 1652. He also served as English ambassador at the French court in 1656. His brother George Lockhart was appointed Lord Advocate, and he purchased the Lanarkshire estates of the Earl of Carnwath. Both Lee and Carnwath estates were inherited by his son Sir George Lockhart of Lee (1673–1731). He acted as a commissioner for the Act of Union between England and Scotland in 1707, but later adopted the Jacobite cause. He was involved in the Jacobite Rising of 1715 but escaped serious punishment. George's grandson, another George, fought with the Jacobites in the 1745 Rising, and afterwards went into exile. This George's younger brother James also went overseas, fighting in the Austrian army during the Seven Years' War. He inherited the Lee estates by staging the death of his traitorous older brother, and was made a Count of the Holy Roman Empire in 1782. His nephew, Alexander Lockhart of Lee, member of Parliament for Berwick-upon-Tweed, was made a baronet in 1806.

By this time, the parklands around Lee Castle had been laid out, as recorded on William Roy's maps of the mid 18th century, although the form of the house at this time is unknown. Sir Charles Lockhart, 2nd Baronet (1799–1832), built a new house at Lee in 1817, but shortly after his death Sir Norman Lockhart, 3rd Baronet (1802–1849), commissioned James Gillespie Graham to design a much larger house. Work began in 1834, incorporating the earlier building, and continued until 1845. The 5th baronet made changes to the parklands in the later 19th century, but on his death in 1919 the baronetcy became extinct. In 1948 the house and estate passed out of the family, and were later split up in the 1970s. The feudal barony of Lee was granted by Petition to Her Majesty Queen Elizabeth II's Representative in Scotland, the Lord Lyon, King of Arms to The Much Honoured Terence Alvis of Lee, 23rd Baron of Cam'nethan, 33rd Baron of Lee.

Baron Alvis of Lee (33rd Baron) carried out major restoration to the house over a ten-year period and sold Lee Castle in 1987 to E. Leslie Peter, a Canadian USA-based businessman and philanthropist, who purchased the Lordship of Lee and was known to be a generous benefactor to the Westminster Abbey restoration appeal. In 2004 the house, along with around 250 acres (100 ha) / 261 acres (106 ha) of land and the feudal caput, was put up for sale on the internet site eBay, although this was unsuccessful. The house was sold a few months later for an all-time record price for a private Scottish residence to Addison Fischer, an American tycoon.
