= Lockharts of Lee =

Lanarkshire family

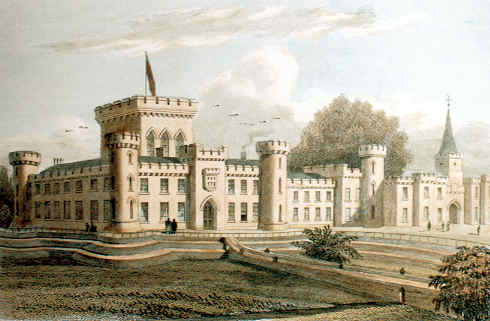
Lee Castle (shown as reconstructed in the 19th century), seat of the Lockharts of Lee from the 13th century to 2004.

The Lockharts of Lee are a Lanarkshire family that trace their descent from Sir Simon Locard. The family estate is the barony of Lee, centred on Lee Castle near Lanark, originally built around 1272 but much expanded in the 19th century.

== Origins ==
Coat of arms of the Lockharts of Lee: Argent a man’s heart proper within a fetterlock sable, on a chief azure three boar’s heads erased of the first.

Sir Simon Locard, 2nd of Lee, is said to have accompanied Sir James Douglas on his expedition to the East with the heart of Robert the Bruce, which relic, according to Froissart, Locard brought home from Spain when Douglas fell in battle against the Moors at the Battle of Teba, and buried in Melrose Abbey. This incident was the origin of the "man's heart within a fetterlock" borne on the Lockhart shield, which in turn perhaps led to the altered spelling of the surname.

William Dunbar in his Lament for the Makaris mourns Schir Mungo Lokert of the Le among a roll call of mainly fifteenth century poets. This was possibly the knycht (d. 1489) identified by Priscilla Bawcutt. No works have been traced to him.

== 17th century ==
Sir James Lockhart of Lee (d. 1674), was a lord of the Court of Session with the judicial title of Lord Lee, who commanded a regiment at the battle of Preston (1648). Lord Lee's eldest son, Sir William Lockhart of Lee (1621–1675), after fighting on the king's side in the English Civil War, attached himself to Oliver Cromwell, whose niece he married, and by whom he was appointed commissioner for the administration of justice in Scotland in 1652, and English ambassador at the French court in 1656, where he greatly distinguished himself by his successful diplomacy.

Lord Lee's second son, Sir George Lockhart (c. 1630–1689), was Lord Advocate in Cromwell's time, and was celebrated for his persuasive eloquence; in 1674, when he was disbarred for alleged disrespect to the court of session in advising an appeal to parliament, fifty barristers showed their sympathy for him by withdrawing from practice. Lockhart was readmitted in 1676, and became the leading advocate in political trials, in which he usually appeared for the defence. He was appointed Lord President of the Court of Session in 1685, and was shot in the streets of Edinburgh on 31 March 1689 by John Chiesley, against whom the Lord President had adjudicated a cause relating to the inheritance of the Kerswell estate by Carnwath. Sir George Lockhart purchased the extensive estates of the Earls of Carnwath in Lanarkshire, which were inherited by his eldest son, George Lockhart of Lee (1673–1731), whose mother was Philadelphia, daughter of Lord Wharton.

== 18th century ==
The grandson of George Lockhart of Lee, James, who assumed his mother's name of Wishart (of Clifton Hall) in addition to that of Lockhart, was in the Austrian service during the Seven Years' War, and was created a baron and count of the Holy Roman Empire. He succeeded to the estates of Lee as well as of Carnwath, both of which properties passed, on the death of his son Charles without issue in 1802, to his nephew, Sir Alexander Lockhart, 1st Baronet, who was created a baronet in 1806. Both the first Baronet and his third son, Alexander Lockhart, were members of Parliament.

== Modern history ==
On the death of Sir Simon Macdonald Lockhart, 5th Baronet in 1919, the baronetcy became extinct. The family occupied Lee Castle, and owned extensive property in the area including the nearby Tower of Hallbar, until 2004 when it was sold to an American businessman.
