= Carluke High School =

Coordinates: 55°44′6″N 3°49′34″W

Location
- Carnwath Road; Carluke, South Lanarkshire, ML8 4EA; Scotland

Information
- Head Teacher: Steve Duffy
- Senior Management: Grant McCallum; Gayle Duffus; David Robertson; Gail Hope
- Houses: Original: Douglas, Lee, Milton, Kirkton. Added in 2006: Belstane, Halbar.
- Colours: Black, blue, white
- School Captains: Mirin Scott; Finlay MacKenzie; Findlay Obinna; Dervla Donnelly
- Dux: Joseph Seed
- Website: https://www.carluke-highschool.org.uk/

Carluke High School is a secondary school located in Carluke, South Lanarkshire, Scotland. The school serves pupils from Carluke and the surrounding villages of Braidwood, Forth, Law, Kilncadzow and Yieldshields. Since 2019, the head teacher has been Steve Duffy. As of 2026, the school roll stood at 1,102 pupils.

== History ==
Carluke High School underwent a major redevelopment as part of South Lanarkshire Council’s secondary schools modernisation programme. Construction of the new school building began in 2005 on the original site. The majority of the former building was demolished, with the exception of the Physical Education block, which remains standing and now forms part of Carluke Leisure Centre.

== Campus and facilities ==
The modern school campus includes general teaching classrooms, specialist subject rooms, and sports facilities. The close connection with Carluke Leisure Centre allows pupils access to indoor sports halls and fitness facilities as part of the physical education curriculum.

== Curriculum ==
Carluke High School follows the Curriculum for Excellence framework, offering a broad range of subjects at National, Higher, and Advanced Higher levels. The school places an emphasis on academic attainment, vocational learning, and personal development.

== Extracurricular activities ==
The school offers a variety of extracurricular activities, including sports teams, clubs, and leadership opportunities. Pupils are encouraged to take part in wider achievement programmes and community-based initiatives.
