= Chancers =

Chancers could refer to

- Chancers (film), a BBC documentary set in Braidwood, South Lanarkshire
- Chancers (novel), a novel by Gerald Vizenor
