= Lockhart River =

Lockhart River may refer to:

== Australia ==
- Lockhart River, Queensland, a community in Queensland
  - Aboriginal Shire of Lockhart River, a local government area in Queensland
- Lockhart River (Queensland), a river in Queensland
- Lockhart River, Western Australia

== Canada ==
- Lockhart River (Northwest Territories)

== See also ==
- Lockhart (disambiguation)
