= Anne Lockhart =

Annie, Ann or Anne Lockhart may refer to:

- Anne Lockhart of Tarbrax (before 1635 – after 1670), daughter of Scottish courtier James Lockhart of Lee
- Anne Lockhart, Countess of Aberdeen (before 1660 – 1707), daughter of Anne Lockhart of Tarbrax
- Grace Annie Lockhart (1855–1916), Canadian recipient of Bachelor's degree in 1875
- Anne Lockhart (actress) (born 1953), American cast member of Battlestar Galactica, a/k/a Annie Lockhart

== Characters ==
- Ann Lockhart, lead female role, played by Sarah Wynter, in 2002's Coastlines (film)
