= James Lockhart =

James Lockhart may refer to:

- James Lockhart (Scottish aristocrat) (1727–1790), Scottish aristocrat and military figure
- James Lockhart (banker) (1763–1852), English amateur mathematician
- James Lockhart (Indiana politician) (1806–1857), American politician
- James A. Lockhart (1850–1905), United States Representative from North Carolina
- J. B. Lockhart (1886–1969), Scottish mathematician
- James B. Lockhart III (born 1946), director of the US Federal Housing Finance Agency (FHFA)
- James Stewart Lockhart (1858–1937), British colonial administrator in Hong Kong and China
- James Lockhart (conductor) (1930–2025), Scottish conductor
- James Lockhart (historian) (1933–2014), academic and historian specializing in early Latin America and Nahuatl sources
- James Bruce Lockhart (1941–2018), British diplomat, intelligence officer, author, and artist
- James Lockhart (Oklahoma politician) (born 1974), American politician, member of the Oklahoma House of Representatives
- James Lockhart of Lee (died 1674), Scottish courtier, politician and judge
