= Tower of Hallbar =

16th-century tower house in Scotland

- Braidwood, South Lanarkshire
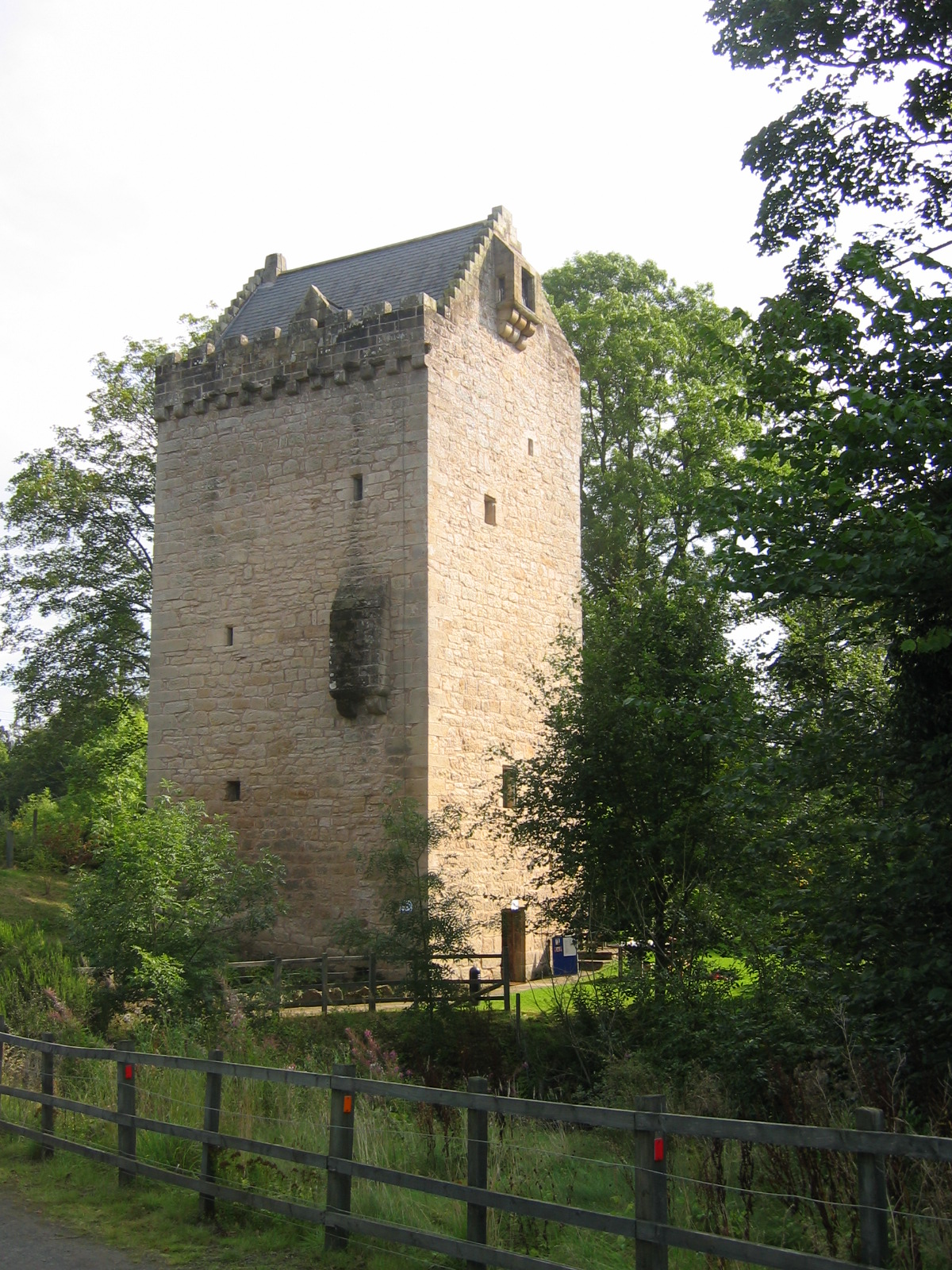
- The Tower of Hallbar, seen from the west.

Site information
- Type: Tower house
- Owner: Lockharts of Lee
- Condition: Restored from 1998

Location
- Coordinates: 55.7036°N 3.8485°W

Site history
- Built: Mid-16th century
- In use: Until 1984

The Tower of Hallbar, also known as Hallbar Tower and Braidwood Castle, is a 16th-century tower house, located to the west of the River Clyde in South Lanarkshire, Scotland. The tower is situated above the Braidwood Burn, 3.5 km (2.2 mi) south-west of Carluke, and 1.5 km (0.93 mi) east of Crossford. It has been restored and is let out as holiday accommodation.

== History ==
The barony of Braidwood was first granted to John de Monfod in 1326, by Robert the Bruce. In 1581, the barony was transferred to Harie Stewart of Gogar, brother of James Stewart of Bothwellmuir, who was briefly Earl of Arran (Scotland) during the insanity of the third earl, James Hamilton. The tower was recorded at this time, making it likely that it was built in response to James V's edict that "tours of fence" be built on all lands over £100 Scots in value.

Braidwood, and Hallbar with it, came into the possession of Lord Maitland of Thirlestane Castle, later passing through the hands of the Marquess of Douglas, before changing hands again in 1681, when it was bought by George Lockhart of Lee Castle, whose estate adjoined Braidwood to the south.

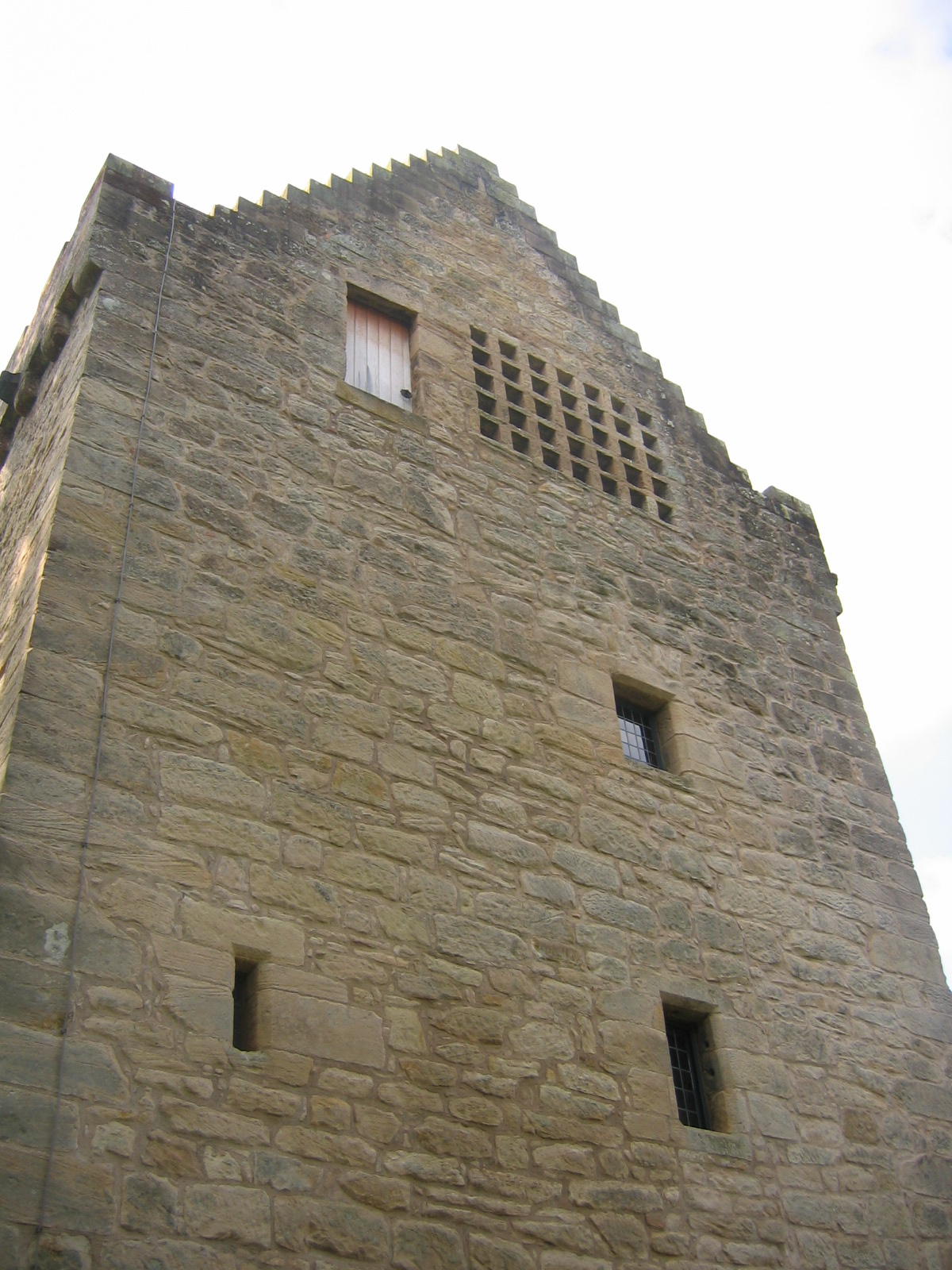
The north wall of the tower, showing the dovecot.

By the mid-19th century the tower was in ruins, but dereliction was prevented by Sir Norman Macdonald Lockhart Bt., the young laird of Lee, who had the tower restored by D R Rankin of Carluke in 1861. The upper parts of the castle, including parapet, cap-house, gables and roof, were rebuilt at this time. The tower was then leased, generating income for the Lockharts. One notable tenant was the Rev. Neville Donaldson, minister of Glasgow Cathedral, who lived here during the 1950s and 1960s. The last tenant left in 1984, and the tower once again became semi-derelict, succumbing to vandalism.

Hallbar is still owned by the Lockharts of Lee, but in 1998 a lease was agreed to with the Vivat Trust, a historic buildings preservation trust. The Trust agreed to restore and convert the Tower for use as holiday accommodation. Design work was undertaken by Peter Drummond and Jim Grant of ARP Lorimer. Extensive masonry consolidation, including the rebuilding of a defective section of the upper wall together with complete reroofing, was undertaken in conjunction with the restoration of the nearby cottage or bothy to form further accommodation.

With the demise of the Vivat Trust, the castle is let through cottages.com

== The tower ==
The narrow, five-storey tower is only 7.5 m square, with walls up to 1.6 m thick. Each level originally had a single room. A winding stair, built into the thickness of the walls, wraps around and links the floors. At the basement level is a low-vaulted cellar with its own access. The main door is at the first-floor level, opening onto a small hall. Above this are two further rooms, the second vaulted.

The stairs continue to a pyramidal cap-house, giving access to the east parapet walk. The west parapet walk is accessed through the garret room at this level. The parapet walks are corbelled, as is an oriel window in the south gable.

A projecting garderobe was added on the west wall in the 19th century. Within the outer face of the north gable is a dovecot, formerly accessed via a timber walkway from a high-level door. The chimney runs behind the pigeon holes, ensuring the birds were kept warm in winter.

To the south of the castle, a barmkin or courtyard, approximately 30 m by 13 m, was originally surrounded by a stone wall. It is likely that the first-floor doorway was accessed from a walkway on top of the courtyard wall.

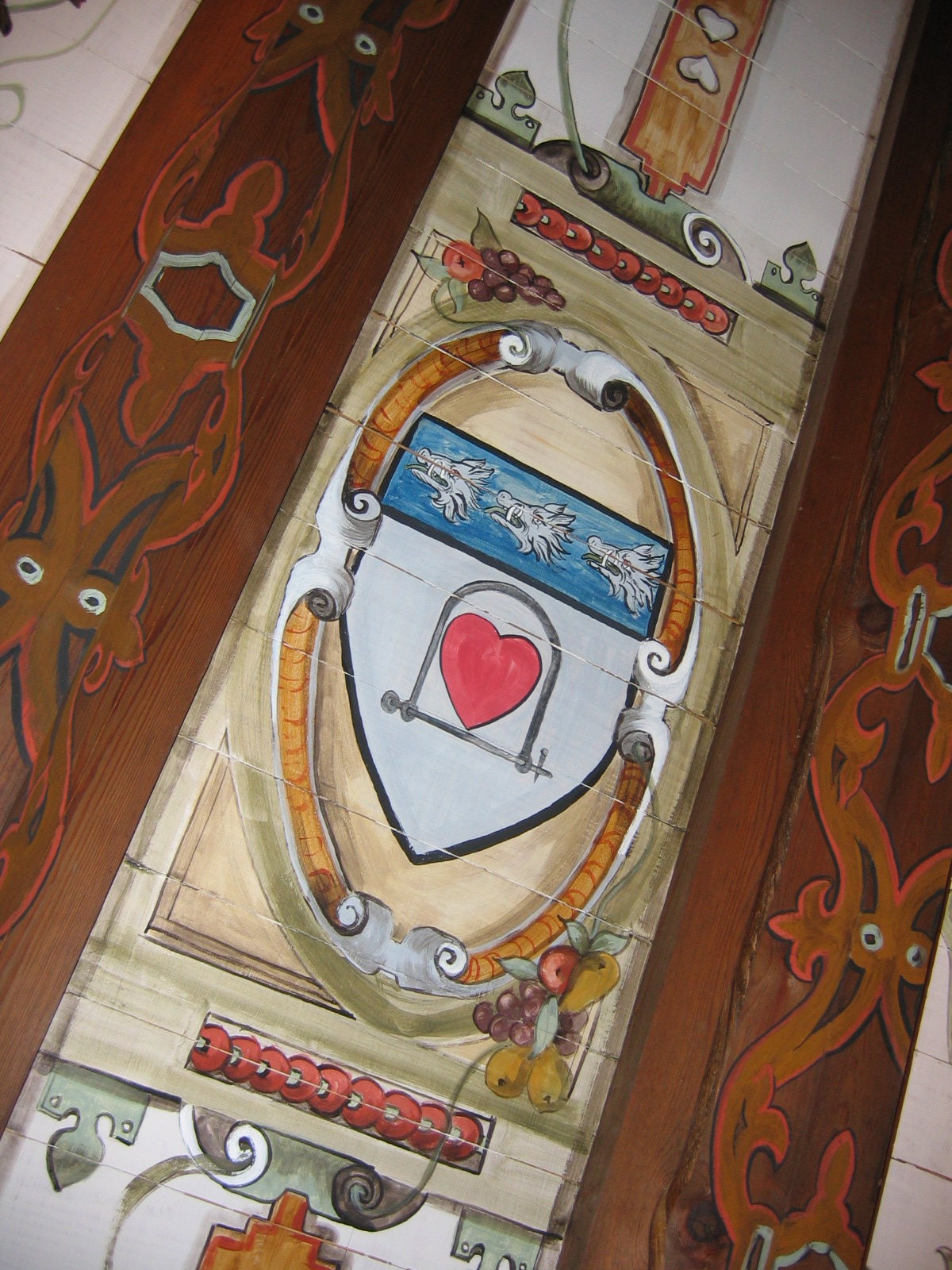
The Lockhart arms on the hall ceiling.

The renovation of 1998 was sensitively carried out, with few major alterations. The vaulted cellar now contains a kitchen, while a bathroom was installed on the second floor, now subdivided into two rooms and a passage. Other repairs were carried out to strengthen the stone walls and to reduce the weight of the roof. In the hall, the ceiling was painted with a medieval design incorporating the Lockhart arms.

The tower is a category A listed building, while the ground to the south, which may once have formed a barmkin, is a Scheduled Ancient Monument. The tower itself was de-scheduled to allow the conversion works to go ahead.

As of 2006, there is a house at Carluke High School named after the tower, although, for unknown reasons, the school spells it as "Halbar".

== See also ==
- List of places in South Lanarkshire

== Bibliography ==
- Mason, Gordon The Castles of Glasgow and the Clyde, Goblinshead, 2000
- Salter, Mike The Castles of South West Scotland, Folly Publications, 1993
- "The Tower of Hallbar", n.d., leaflet published by the Vivat Trust.
