= Touch piece =

Object of superstition

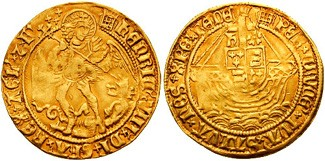
Henry VIII: Archangel Michael doing battle with Satan (thin gold coin)

A touch piece is a coin or medal believed to cure disease, bring good luck, influence people's behaviour, carry out a specific practical action, etc.

What most touch pieces have in common is that they have to be touched or in close physical contact for the 'power' concerned to be obtained and/or transferred. Once this is achieved, the power is assumed to be permanently present in the coin, which effectively becomes an amulet.

== Cure of diseases by coins ==
Coins which had been given at Holy Communion could be rubbed on parts of the body suffering from rheumatism and it was thought that they would effect a cure. Medallions or medalets showing the "Devil defeated" were specially minted in Britain and distributed amongst the poor in the belief that they would reduce disease and sickness. The tradition of touch pieces goes back to the time of Ancient Rome, when the Emperor Vespasian (69–79 AD) gave coins to the sick at a ceremony known as "the touching".

Many touch piece coins were treasured by the recipients and sometimes remained in the possession of families for many generations, as in the case of the "Lee Penny" obtained by Sir Simon Lockhart from the Holy Land whilst on a crusade. This coin, an Edward I groat, still held by the family, has a triangular stone of a dark red colour set into it. The coin is kept in a gold box given by Queen Victoria to General Lockhart. It can supposedly cure rabies, haemorrhage, and various animal ailments. The coin was exempted from the Church of Scotland's prohibition on charms and was lent to the citizens of Newcastle during the reign of King Charles I to protect them from the plague. A sum of between £1,000 and £6,000 was pledged for its return.

The legend of the Lee Penny gave rise to Sir Walter Scott's novel The Talisman. The amulet was placed in water, which was then drunk to provide the cure. No money was ever taken for its use. In 1629 Isobel Young, burned as a witch later that same year, sought to borrow the stone to cure cattle. The family of Lockart of Lee would not lend the stone in its silver setting; however, they gave flagons of water in which the coin had been steeped.

=== Healing of the King's or Queen's Evil ===
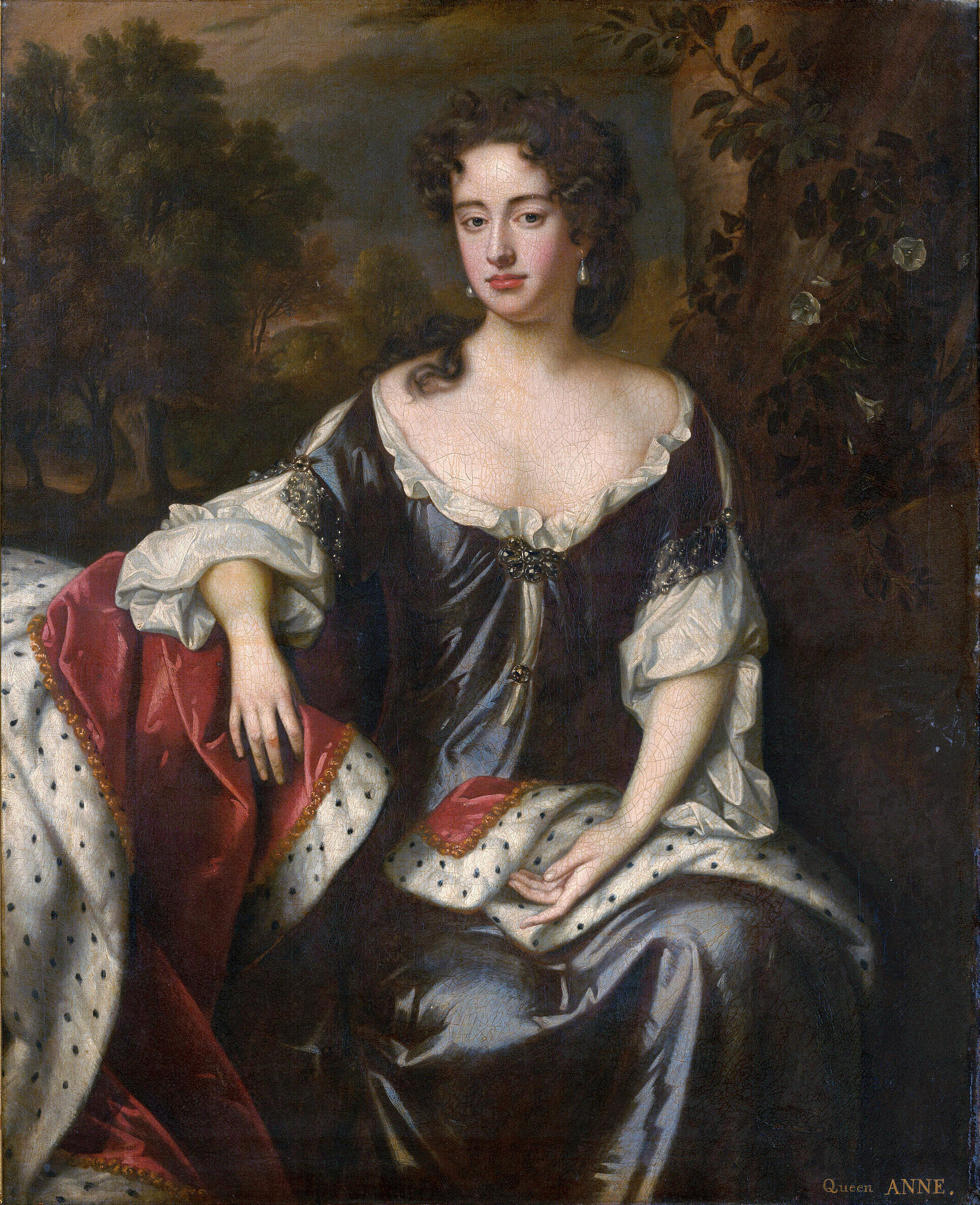
Queen Anne

Persons of royal blood were thought to have the "God-given" power of healing this condition by touch, and sovereigns of England and France practised this power to cure sufferers of scrofula, meaning "Swine Evil", as it was common in pigs, a form of tuberculosis of the bones and lymph nodes, commonly known as the "King's or Queen's Evil" or "Morbus Regius". In France it was called the Mal De Roi. William the Lion, King of Scotland is recorded in 1206 as curing a case of scrofula by his touching and blessing a child who had the ailment. Charles I touched around 100 people shortly after his coronation at Holyrood in 1633. Rarely fatal, the disease was naturally given to spontaneously cure itself after lengthy periods of remission. Many miraculous cures were recorded, and failures were put down to a lack of faith in the sufferer. The original Book of Common Prayer of the Anglican Church contained this ceremony. The divine power of kings was believed to be descended from Edward the Confessor, who, according to some legends, received it from Saint Remigius.

The custom lasted from the time of Edward the Confessor until Anne's reign, although her predecessor, William III refused to believe in the tradition and did not practice the ceremony. James II and James Francis Edward Stuart, the Old Pretender, performed the ceremony. Charles Edward Stuart, the "Young Pretender", is known to have carried out the rite in 1745 at Glamis Castle during the time of his rebellion against George II and also in France after his exile. Finally, Henry Benedict Stuart, the brother of Charles, performed the ceremony until his death in 1807. All the Jacobite Stuarts produced special touch-piece medalets, with a variety of designs and inscriptions. They are found in gold, silver and even lead.

Robert II of France was the first to practise the ritual in the 11th century. Henry IV of France is reported as often touching and healing as many as 1,500 individuals at a time. No record survives of the first four Norman kings' attempting to cure by touching; however, there are records of Henry II of England doing so. Mary I of England performed the ceremony and her half-sister, Elizabeth I, cured all "ranks and degrees". William Tooker published a book on the subject, titled Charisma; sive Donum Sanationis.

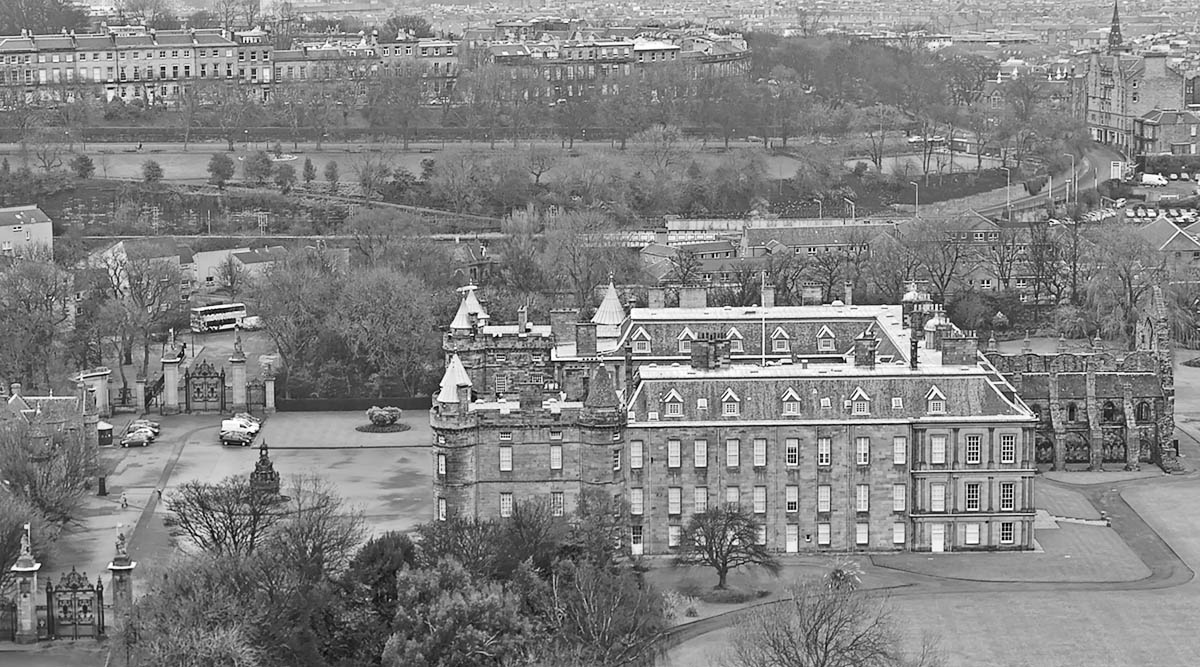
Holyrood Palace and Abbey 2006

Queen Anne, amongst many others, touched the 2-year-old infant Samuel Johnson in 1712 to no effect, for although he eventually recovered, he was left badly scarred and blind in one eye. He wore the medal around his neck all of his life and it is now preserved in the British Museum. It was believed that if the touch piece was not worn then the condition would return. Queen Anne last performed the ceremony on 14 April 1714. George I put an end to the practice as being "too Catholic", but the kings of France continued the custom until 1825. William of Malmesbury describes the ceremony in his Chronicle of the Kings of England (1120) and Shakespeare describes the practice in Macbeth.

The gold Angel coins, which were first struck in Britain in 1465 and later dates, particularly of the reigns of James I and Charles I, are often found officially pierced in the centre, as illustrated in Coins of England 2001 to be used as touch pieces. The sovereigns of the House of Stuart used the ceremony to help bolster the belief in the "Divine Right of Kings". Charles I indeed issued Angels almost exclusively as touch pieces to the point where intact specimens are hard to come by. He was the first monarch to perform the ceremony in Scotland at Holyrood Palace on 18 June 1633. The size of the hole may indicate the amount of gold taken in payment by the jeweller or the mint for the work of piercing or punching and the provision of a ribbon or silk string.

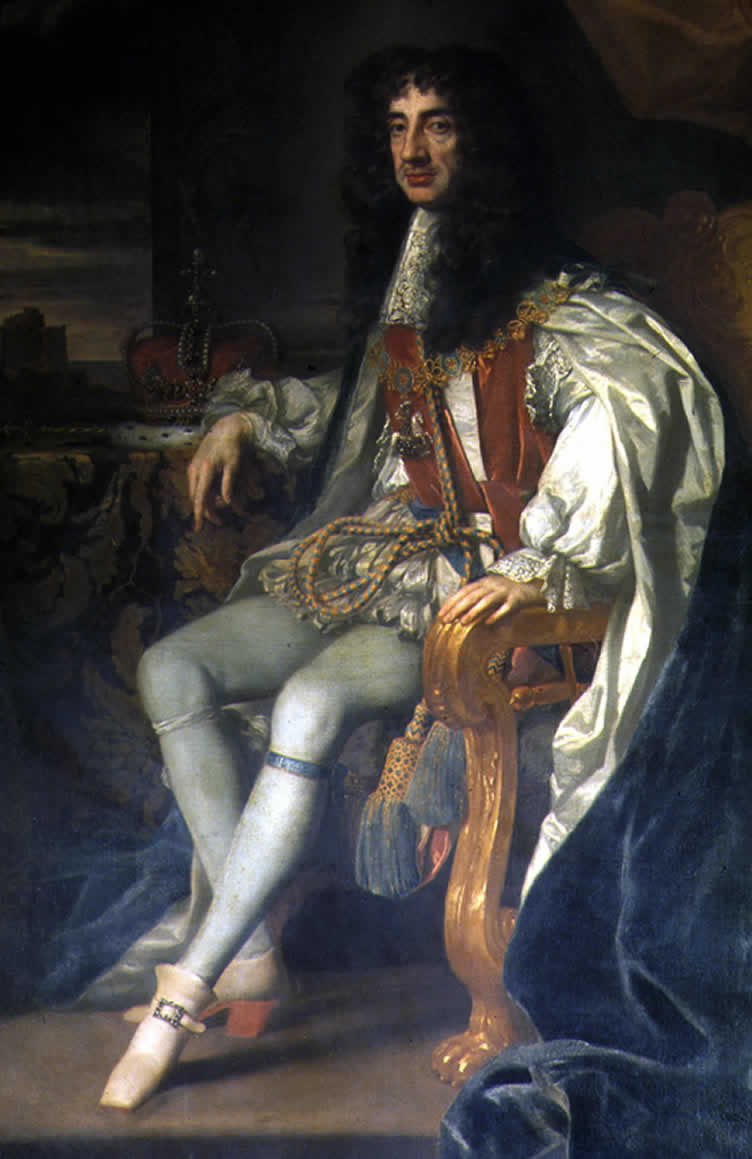
Charles II

The cure was usually more of a "laying on of hands" by the monarch and the Angel coin or medalet, etc., although touched by the monarch, was seen as a receipt or talisman of the potential of the monarch's healing power. Originally the king had paid for the support of the sufferer until he had recovered or died. The move to the gift of a gold coin touch piece may represent the compromise payment when the custom of "room and board" support by the king ceased. Coffee in the 18th and early 19th centuries was thought to be a relief, but not a cure for scrofula.

The Angel coin was favoured at these ceremonies because it has on the obverse an image of St. Michael slaying the Devil represented as a dragon (actually a heraldic Wyvern). St. Michael, especially venerated for his role as captain of the heavenly host that drove Satan out of Heaven, was also associated with the casting out of devils and thus was regarded as a guardian of the sick.

The monarch him/herself hung these touch piece amulets around the necks of sufferers. In later years Charles II only touched the medalet as he unsurprisingly disliked touching diseased people directly. He "touched" 92,107 people in the 21 years from 1661 to 1682, performing the function 8,500 times in 1682 alone.

After these coins ceased to be minted in 1634, Charles II had holed gold medalets specially produced by the mint with a similar design of good defeating evil. An example of a medalet in the British Museum has a hand descending from a cloud towards four heads, with "He touched them" around the margin, and on the other side a rose and thistle, with "And they were healed."

Samuel Pepys recorded in his diary for 13 April 1661: "To Whitehall to the Banquet House and there saw the King heale, the first time that ever I saw him do it — which he did with great gravity; and it seemed to me to be an ugly office and a simple one." John Evelyn also refers to the ceremony in his Diary on the dates of 6 July 1660 and 28 March 1684.

John Wain in his biography of Dr. Samuel Johnson writes that Johnson was taken by his mother as a small child to London, where after standing in a long line with many others, he was in turn subject to this ritual from Queen Anne.

Unsurprisingly the system was open to abuse and numerous attempts were made to ensure that only the deserving cases got the gold coin, because others would simply sell it.

== Luck and coins ==
=== Good luck coins ===
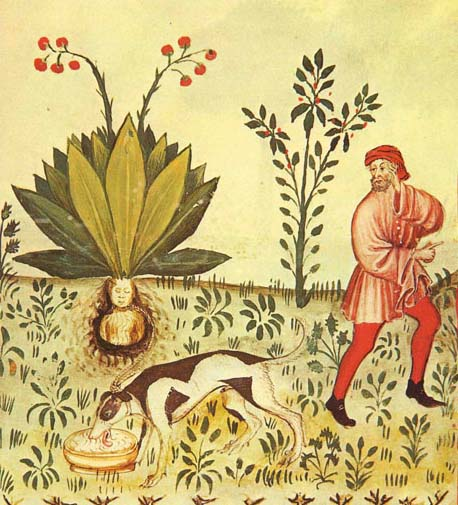
Illustration of a mandrake, believed to have magical properties, from the 15th century manuscript Tacuinum Sanitatis.

In many countries it was believed that coins with holes in them would bring good luck. This belief could link to a similar superstition linked to stones or pebbles which had holes, often called "Adder Stones" and hung around the neck. Carrying a coin bearing the date of one's birth is purportedly "lucky". In Austria any coin found during a rainstorm is especially lucky, because it is said to have dropped from Heaven. European charms often require silver coins to be used, which are engraved with marks such as an "X" or are bent. These actions personalize the coin, making it uniquely special for the owner. The lucky "sixpence" is a well-known example in Great Britain.

Holy Sacrament communion coins were thought to acquire curative powers over various ailments, especially rheumatism and epilepsy. Such otherwise normal coins, which had been offered at communion, were purchased from the priest for 12 or 13 pennies. The coin was then punched through and worn around the neck of the sick person, or made into a ring.

Gonzalez-Wippler records that if money is left with a mandrake root it will double in quantity overnight. She also stated that the way to ensure the future wealth of a baby is to put part of the child's umbilical cord in a bag together with a few coins. Lucky coins are lucky charms which are carried around attract wealth and good luck, whilst many, often silver coins, attached to bracelets multiply the effect as well as create a noise which scares away evil spirits. Bathing with a penny wrapped in a washcloth brings good fortune at Beltane or the Winter Solstice in Celtic Mythology. Chinese "Money Frogs" or "Money Toads", often with a coin in their mouths, bring food, luck and prosperity.

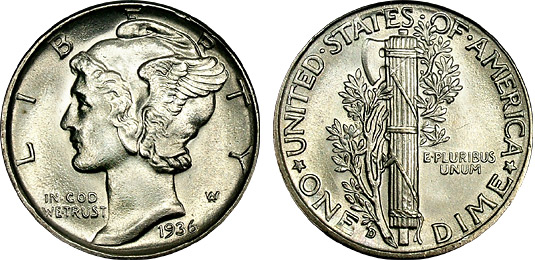
1936 Winged Liberty Head (Mercury) dime

A Celtic belief is that at the full moon any silver coins on one's person should be jingled or turned over to prevent bad luck, also the silver coins would increase as the moon grew in size. A wish to a new moon could also be made, but not as seen through glass, jingling coins at the same time. American silver "Mercury" dimes, especially with a leap year date, are especially lucky. Gamblers' charms are often these dimes, Mercury being the Roman god who ruled the crossroads, games of chance, etc. Although these dimes actually figure the head of Liberty, people commonly mistake it for Mercury. A silver dime worn at the throat will supposedly turn black if someone tries to poison the wearer's food or drink. American "Indian Head" cents are worn as amulets to ward off evil or negative spirits. In Spain a bride places a silver coin from her father in one shoe and a gold coin from her mother in the other. This will ensure that she will never want for anything. Silver coins were placed in Christmas puddings and birthday cakes to bring good luck and wealth. A variation on this custom was that in some families each member added a coin to the pudding bowl, making a wish as they did so. If their coin turned up in their bowl it's said their wish was sure to come true. In Greece, a coin is added to vasilopita, a bread baked in honor of the feast day of St. Basil the Great. At midnight the sign of the cross is etched with a knife across the cake, to bless the house and bring good luck for the new year. A piece is sliced for each member of the family and any visitors present at the time, and the person who gets the slice with the coin will receive good luck, and often a gift.

In Japan the five-yen coin is considered lucky because "five yen" in Japanese is go en, which is a homophone with go-en (御縁), en being a word for causal connection or relationship, and "go" being a respectful prefix. Therefore, they are often used at shrines as well as the first money put into a new wallet.

In ancient Rome "good luck" coins were in common circulation. "Votive pieces", for example, were struck by new emperors, promising peace for a set number of years. Citizens would hold such coins in their hand when making a wish or petitioning the gods.

Coins bearing religious symbols are often seen as lucky; for instance, the Mogul emperor Akbar's rupees carry words from the Islamic faith, and in India the Ramatanka shows the Hindu god Rama, his wife, Sita, his brother and the monkey god, Hanuman. Gold ducats issued in the name of the mid-18th century Doge Loredano of Venice bore an image of Christ and were issued to be worn as pendants by pilgrims. The Shinto religion has a shrine called Zeniariai-Benten where followers wash their money in the spring water at certain times of year to ensure that it doubles in quantity. In Roman times, sailors placed coins under the masts of their ships to ensure the protection of the gods from the wrath of the sea.

A rare example of a "Wish Tree" exists near Ardmaddy House in Argyll, Scotland. The tree is a hawthorn, a species traditionally linked with fertility, as in "May Blossom." The trunk and branches are covered with hundreds of coins which have been driven through the bark and into the wood. The local tradition is that a wish will be granted for each of the coins so treated. Many pubs, such as the "Punch Bowl" in Askham, near Penrith in Cumbria have old beams with splits in them where coins are forced "for luck."

In some countries, finding a coin on the ground, then keeping it is considered to provide the finder with good luck for the rest of the day, a belief reflected in the adage "Find a penny, pick it up, all day long you'll have good luck'. Variants of this superstition include good luck only being given to the finder if the coin is found face up, or bad luck being given to the finder if the coin is picked up when it was lying face down.

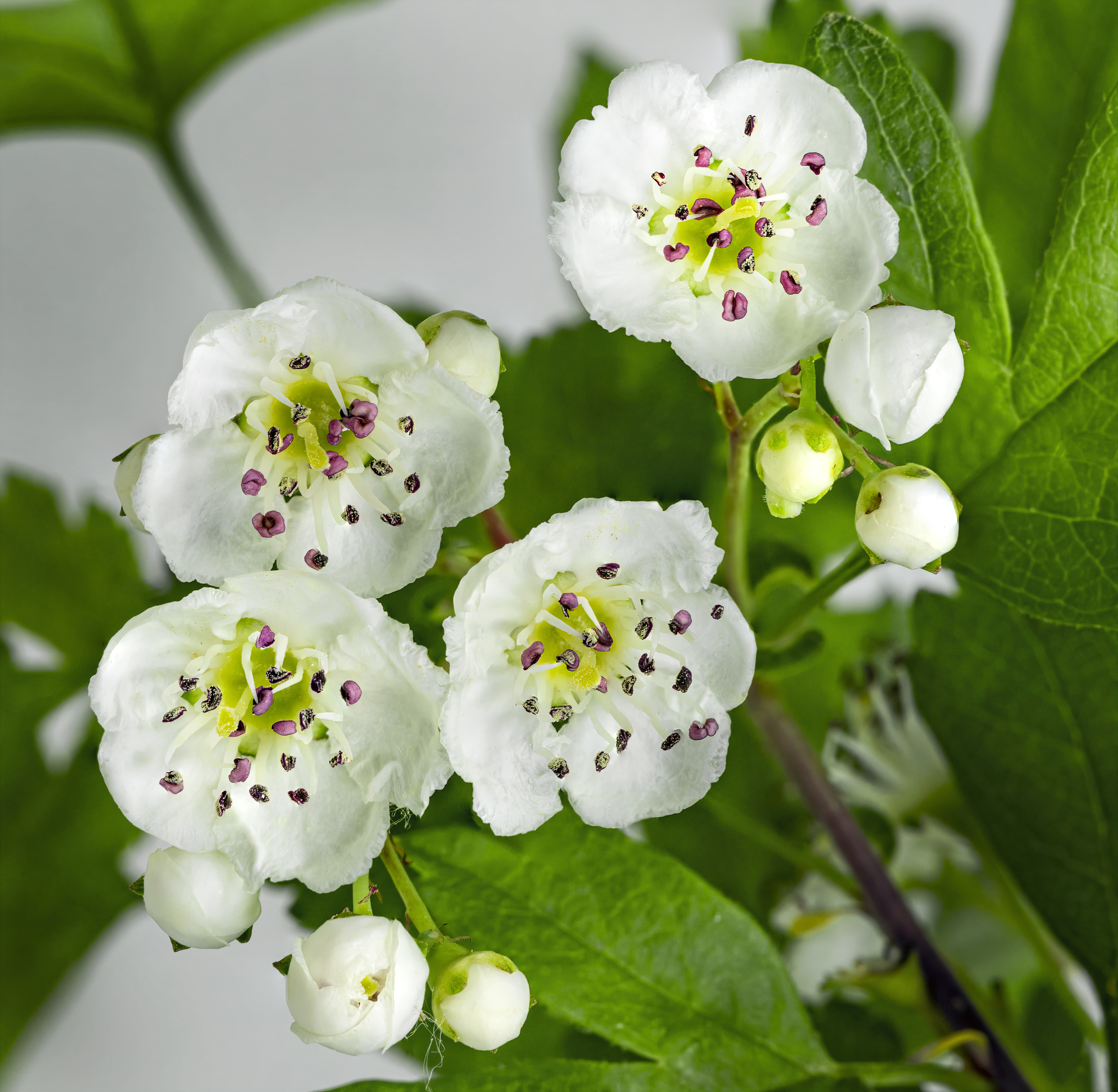
Common Hawthorn flowers

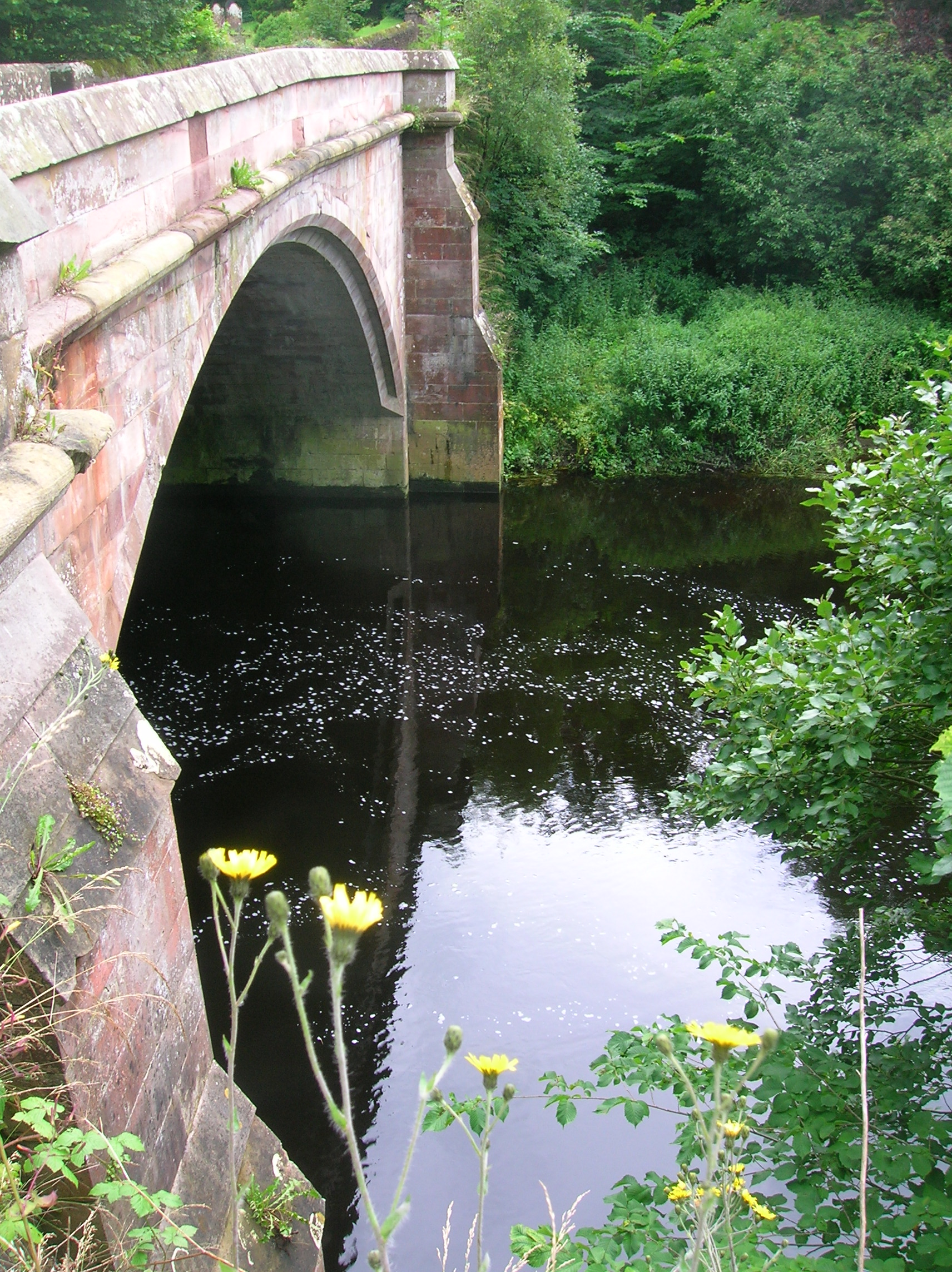
The bridge over the Lowther Water at Askham.

Another local custom at Askham is the throwing of coins from the nearby bridge onto a boulder that lies just below the water level of the river. Getting the coin to land on the rock gives the thrower "good luck." Obvious connections exist with water generally and the practice of throwing in coins to seek favours of the water spirits. The Lady's Well in Kilmaurs, Scotland, is a typical wishing well. At St. Cuby's Well (SX224 564) in Cornwall the legend was that if anyone did not leave an offering of money then they would be followed home by Piskies in the shape of flying moths, embodying the spirits of the dead. At Loch na Gaire in Sutherland, Scotland, it was the tradition to throw coins into the waters to ensure that the waters kept their healing properties.

A "Black Saxpence" in Scots, is a sixpence, supposed by the credulous to be received from the devil, as a pledge of an engagement to be his, soul and body. It is always of a black colour, as not being legal currency; but it is said to possess this singular virtue, that the person who keeps it constantly in his pocket, how much soever he spend, will always find another sixpence beside it.

A Devonian superstition is that carrying crooked coins is good luck and keeps the devil away.

In an example of a modern lucky coin custom, a Canadian sports official secretly embedded a loonie (CAD $1 coin) in the ice of the hockey rink at the 2002 Winter Olympics. Both the Canadian men's and women's hockey teams went on to win gold medals. Canadians have gone on to hide coins in rinks in several subsequent international competitions, and in the foundations of the buildings for the 2010 Winter Olympics in Vancouver. The Royal Canadian Mint has produced a "lucky loonie" commemorative coin for each Winter Olympics since 2002.

=== Bad luck coins ===
In Ireland it is thought to be bad luck to give money away on a Monday.

The 1932 silver yuan coin from China showed a junk, rays of sunshine and a flock of birds. These were seen as symbolising Japan (the rising sun) and its fighter planes (the birds) invading China. The coin was re-issued in 1933 without the sun or the birds.

The "Godless" florin featured a young Queen Victoria but omitted the customary inscriptions Dei Gratia (by the grace of god) as well as Fidei Defensor (defender of the faith), and was regarded as bringing bad luck.

Finding money was bad luck in some cultures and the curse could only be removed by giving away the money.

It is considered bad luck to have an empty pocket, for even a "crooked coin" keeps the devil away.

== Love tokens ==
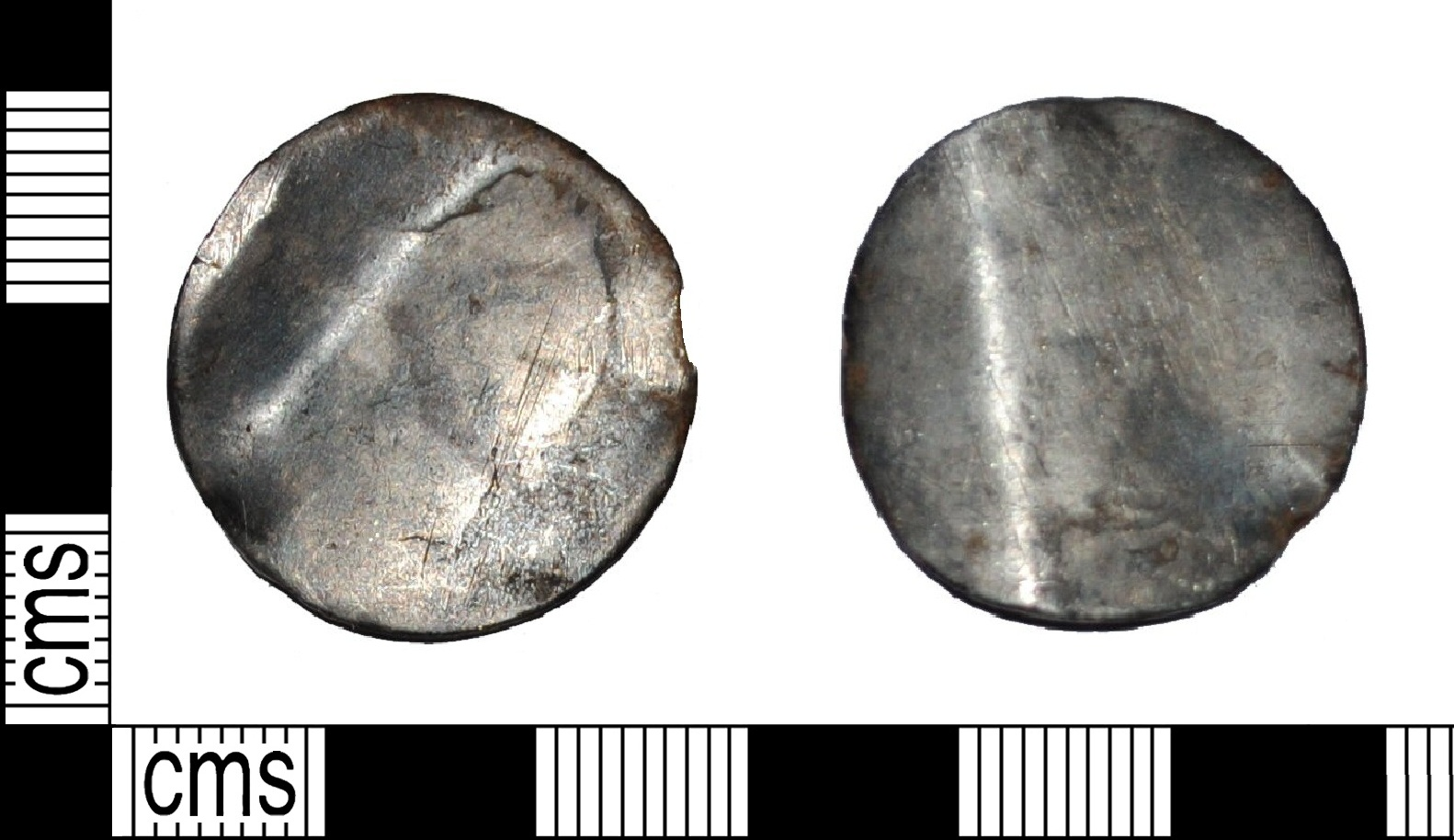
An English love token made from a James II shilling from the late 1600s

The bent coin as a love token may be derived from the well-recorded practice of bending a coin when making a vow to a saint, such as vowing to give it to the saint's shrine if the saint would intercede to cure a sick human, animal, etc. Bending a coin when one person made a vow to another was another practice which arose from this.

== Protection against evil ==
It was believed that the gift of second sight came from the devil; as protection, a silver coin was used to make a cross above the palm of a Gypsy fortune-teller, thus dispelling any evil. In Japan, Korea and Indonesia, coins were made tied together to form sword shapes which were thought to terrify, and therefore ward off, evil spirits. They were also hung above the beds of sick people to drive off the malevolent spirits who were responsible for the illness.

== Curse coins ==
In 2007 a lead "coin-based" curse on a Roman emperor was found by a metal detector user in Lincolnshire. The 1,650-year-old curse was an act of treason, blasphemy and criminal defacement of the imperial coinage. The perpetrator had cursed the emperor Valens by hammering a coin with his image into lead, then folding the lead over his face. Thousands of ordinary lead cursing charms exist with written inscriptions and a small hole for suspending them.

== Touch pieces that influence behaviour ==
Coins placed on the eyes of the dead, if briefly dropped into the drink of a husband or wife, would "blind" them to any infidelities that the partner might be involved in.

Also, some groups say that if a penny is thrown into a person's drink, they must "down" the rest of it.

== Coins carrying out a specific practical action ==
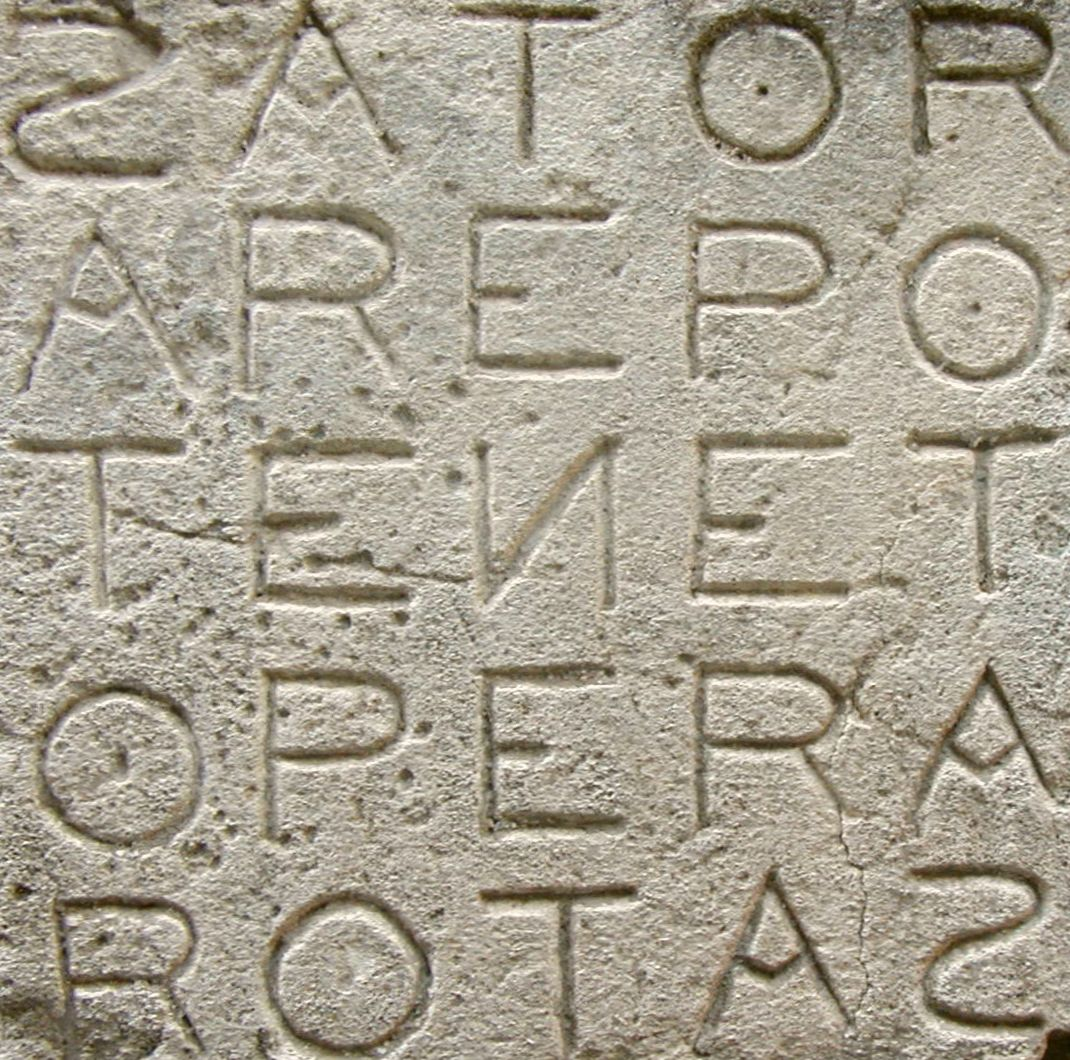
The Sator square

In Germany, since medieval times, it was believed that a silver coin with a Sator square engraved on it will put out a fire if thrown into the conflagration. Coins were placed on the eyes of a corpse to prevent them from opening and also in Greek mythology as payment for the ferryman who would carry the dead person across the River Styx into Hades. In the 17th century coins bearing an engraving of St. George were carried by soldiers as a protection against injury following a lucky escape when a bullet hit such a coin and the soldier remained uninjured (Coins of the World). Some of the gold coins of Edward III carry the cryptic legend: IHS MEDIVM ILLORVM IBAT ("But Jesus passing through the midst of them, went his way" – St'Luke IV. 30). According to Sir John Mandeville, this was a spell against the power of thieves.

== See also ==
- Angel (coin)
- Charon's obol
- Samuel Johnson
- Samuel Pepys
