= Lockheart =

Lockheart is a surname of British origin, which is a variant of the more common surname Lockhart. Lockheart may refer to:

- Julia Lockheart, British artist and academic (writing in art and design)
- Lucy Lockheart, fictional character in the British television series Footballers' Wives
- Mark Lockheart (born 1961), British saxophonist

== See also ==
- Lockhart (disambiguation)
