= Addison Fischer =

American businessman

Addison McElroy Fischer Baron of Lee
- Education: West Virginia University (BS, MS)
- Occupations: businessperson, investor, entrepreneur, philanthropist
- Title: Chairman of Fischer International Systems Corporation

Addison McElroy Fischer, Baron of Lee is an American businessperson in information technology, a venture capital investor, and a philanthropist in the conservation of the environment. He became a Scots baron in the Baronage of Scotland in 2004.

== Career ==
In 1968, while working for West Virginia University, he created software that amplified the throughput capability of IBM mainframe systems up to 40% (the high speed "Executor"). In the 1980s he became majority owner of RSA Data Security and remained a board member until its merger with Security Dynamics in 1996.

In 1995 he provided initial seed funding for the creation of Verisign Inc. which quickly attracted strategic partners and additional financing. In 2011 he was a founding board member of Oceans/Five, a role in which he continues. In 2019 he joined the board of Tri-Alpha Energy, since renamed TAE Technologies, a company developing aneutronic atomic fusion to provide nuclear energy without radioactive by-products.

== Standards work ==
During the 1980s and 1990s, he was a member of several official ANSI committees that set U.S. standards for commercial computer security (ANSI X9) and electronic commerce (ANSI X12). He addressed the U.S. Congress, by invitation, on several topics, including digital signature standards, proposed FBI digital telephony legislation, and global U.S. competitiveness .

From 1995 through 1999 he was a member of the Computer Systems Security and Privacy Advisory Board (since renamed the Information Security and Privacy Advisory Board), and was involved in issues ranging from privacy to cyber-warfare.

== Conservation and environment ==
In 2005 he began working with Dr. Jane Goodall, and her worldwide conservation efforts. He has been a board member of the Jane Goodall Institute since 2008 and Vice-Chairman since 2011.

In 2007 he assumed an Advisory Board role in EPIC, the Electronic Privacy Information Center. Has been a board member since 2011.

In May 2009 he was elected as a director of the East West Institute which works to resolve and prevent international conflicts through non-governmental diplomatic channels.

In April 2010, he supported oceanographer Sylvia Earle and the TED Conference's Mission Blue voyage.

== Awards ==
1990: Outstanding Paper of the Year, A.M.Fischer, "Electronic Document Authorization".

2000: Received the West Virginia University Eberly College of Arts and Sciences Alumni Recognition Award.

June 2008: Awarded an honorary Doctorate of Science degree from West Virginia University and delivered the commencement address.

2011: Awarded the Philanthropist of the Year award by Wild Aid for his work in Asian Tiger Conservation.

Baronage of Scotland
Preceded by Terrence Alvis of Lee	Baron of Lee; 2004-present	Succeeded by Incumbent
