= William Lockhart =

William Lockhart may refer to:

- William Lockhart of Lee (1621–1675), Oliver Cromwell's ambassador at Paris
- William Lockhart (MP) (1787–1856), British member of parliament for Lanarkshire
- William Lockhart (surgeon) (1811–1896), English medical missionary and fellow of the Royal College of Surgeons
- William Lockhart (priest) (1820–1892), English Roman Catholic priest, convert from Anglicanism
- William Peddie Lockhart (1835–1893), Scottish preacher and cricketer
- William Thomas Lockhart (1839 –1900), Ontario merchant and political figure
- Sir William Lockhart (Indian Army officer) (1841–1900), British Indian Army general
- William Ewart Lockhart (1846–1900), Scottish Victorian painter
- William Mustart Lockhart (1855–1941), Scottish topographical painter
