= Carstairs Cumming Douglas =

Scottish physician, educator and medical author

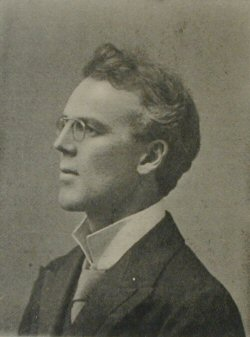
Carstairs Cumming Douglas c.1900

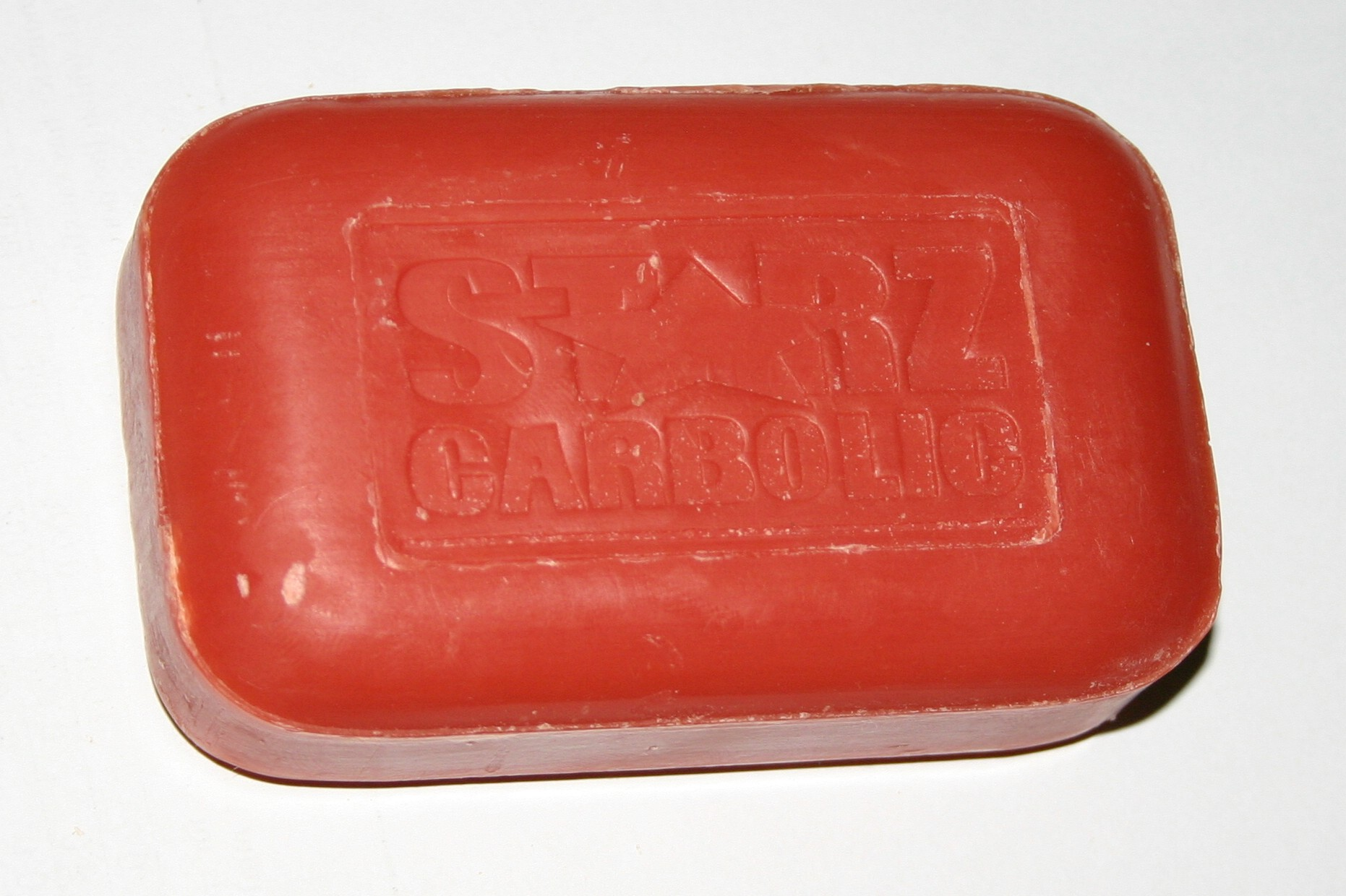
Bar of carbolic soap

Carstairs Cumming Douglas FRSE (1 October 1866 – 28 September 1940) was a Scottish physician, educator and medical author. He was Professor of Medical Jurisprudence and Public Health for 41 years at Anderson's College in Glasgow.

His 1907 publication, School Hygiene, led to the widespread use of carbolic soap in Scottish schools which lasted for most of the twentieth century.

== Life ==
He was born on 1 October 1866 in Kirkcaldy in Fife, the third son of Robert Douglas. Robert's brother, Carstairs' uncle, was the missionary Carstairs Douglas, after whom he was named. He was educated at George Watson's College in Edinburgh. He took a year out to visit Canada before beginning his studies in medicine at the University of Edinburgh in 1884. He graduated with an MB CM in 1890 gaining a further BSc in public health in 1891. He won several prizes during his university career including the Ettles Prize, the Buchanan Scholarship in Midwifery and the Leckie-Mactier Fellowship. This allowed him to finance further postgraduate study in Berlin.

He began his working life in 1892 as assistant to Dr Haldane in Bridge of Allan, taking up private practice in his own right later that year in Skelmorlie/Wemyss Bay on the coast of North Ayrshire. He was given his first doctorate (MD) in 1896 and a further (DSc) in 1901.

In 1898 he moved to Glasgow to practice medicine and lecture at Anderson's College. He was given his professorship in 1901 and later became a governor of the college. He served multiple additional roles, including pathologist to Glasgow Maternity Hospital, director of the West of Scotland Research Laboratory, and Examiner in Public Health at the Scottish universities. He also acted as chief medical officer to both the Liverpool and London Insurance Company and Globe Insurance Company (advising on medical-related claims).

In 1901 he was elected a Fellow of the Royal Society of Edinburgh. His proposers were Alexander Crum Brown, Sir William Turner, Sir James Ormiston Affleck and Sir Alexander Russell Simpson.

In middle life he lived at 2 Royal Crescent in the Charing Cross district of Glasgow.

He died in Glasgow on 28 September 1940.

== Family ==
He married Anita Helena Lockhart, daughter of the artist William Ewart Lockhart.

== Publications ==
- Chemical and Microscopical Aids to Clinical Diagnosis (1899)
- Laws of Health and School Hygiene (1907) (generally referred to simply as "School Hygiene")
