= Yieldshields =

Coordinates: 55.736°N 3.798°W

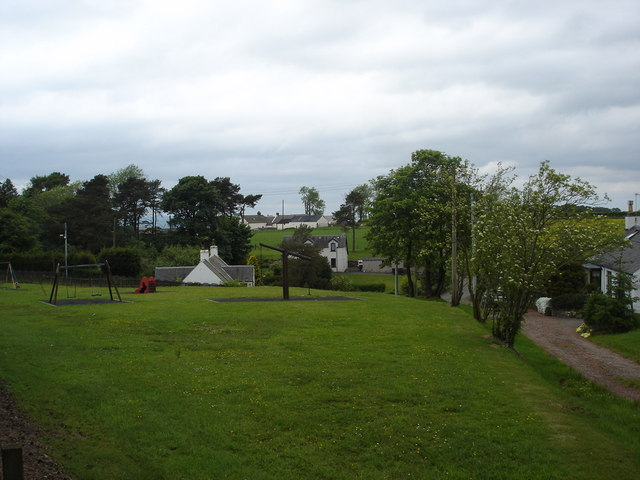
- The village green at Yieldshields

- Location within South Lanarkshire
- OS grid reference: NS871506
- Council area: South Lanarkshire
- Lieutenancy area: Lanarkshire
- Country: Scotland
- Sovereign state: United Kingdom
- Post town: CARLUKE
- Postcode district: ML8
- Dialling code: 01555
- Police: Scotland
- Fire: Scottish
- Ambulance: Scottish
- UK Parliament: Lanark and Hamilton East
- Scottish Parliament: Clydesdale

Yieldshields is a small village in South Lanarkshire, located close to the town of Carluke. A large wind farm was installed at the north end of Thorn road at the Kingshill plantation. In 2024 several new houses were under construction in the village.
