= Kilncadzow =

Village in Lanarkshire, Scotland

Coordinates: 55°43′07″N 3°46′39″W

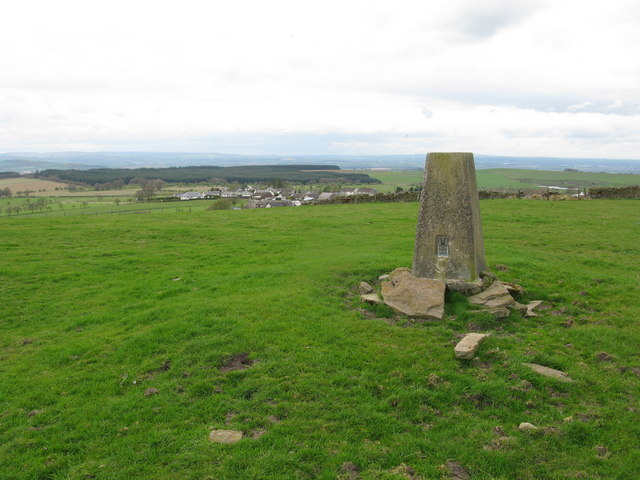
- Kilncadzow Law, with the village in the background

- Location within South Lanarkshire
- OS grid reference: NS884486
- Council area: South Lanarkshire
- Lieutenancy area: Lanarkshire
- Country: Scotland
- Sovereign state: United Kingdom
- Post town: CARLUKE
- Postcode district: ML8
- Dialling code: 01555
- Police: Scotland
- Fire: Scottish
- Ambulance: Scottish
- UK Parliament: Lanark and Hamilton East
- Scottish Parliament: Clydesdale

Kilncadzow (/kɪlˈkeɪɡi/ kil-KAY-ghee) is a small village in rural Lanarkshire, Scotland. It lies two miles (three kilometres) southeast of Carluke and three miles (five kilometres) north of Lanark on the A721 road, part of the old road from Glasgow to Peebles.

== History ==
The Roman road which passed through Clydesdale to the western extremity of the Antonine Wall can be found in Kilncadzow. An abandoned stone quarry – thought to date from the 18th century – is located on common land, just north of the A721.

As an agricultural area, the village has many farms in close proximity. These include The Hill of Kilncadzow, The Hole of Kilncadzow, Greenbank, Collilaw, Birkenhead, The Drums, Craigend, Craighead, Gowanside and Leemuir. The three farms which were within the village – Townhead, Mid Town and West Town (all thought to date from the 18th century) – are no longer used as farms. A school (now the community hall) was built in the late 19th century to provide primary education for the children of the area. During the 20th century, council housing was provided for agricultural workers.

== Location ==
The village is located primarily on two roads – Carnwath Road (the A721) and Craigenhill Road. There are approximately 40 houses in the village, the majority of which were constructed during the 1970s and '80s.

The village enjoys panoramic views to the south, east and west. The best views are from Kilncadzow Law, upon which a radio transmitter is located.

Most villagers commute to work; however, there are no public transport facilities and ownership or access to a vehicle is almost essential. Transport links and local amenities are located mainly in Carluke and Lanark; however, the village does have a community hall and a swing park.
