= Lockhart =

Lockhart may refer to:

- Lockhart (surname)

== Places ==
=== Australia ===
- Lockhart, New South Wales
- Lockhart Shire, New South Wales
- Lockhart River, Queensland
- Lockhart River, Western Australia

=== United States ===
- Lockhart, Alabama
- Lockhart, Florida
- Lockhart, Minnesota
- Lockhart, South Carolina
- Lockhart, Texas
- Lockhart, West Virginia
- Lockhart Township, Pike County, Indiana
- Lockhart Township, Minnesota
- Lockhart Stadium, Fort Lauderdale, Florida

== Other uses ==
- Lockhart, a codename for the Xbox Series S video game console

== See also ==
- Lockharts, California, United States
- Lockheart, a surname
