= James Lockhart (Scottish aristocrat) =

- Born: 1727; Lanarkshire, Scotland
- Died: 1790
- Occupation: Professional soldier
- Relatives: George Lockhart (paternal grandfather)

James Lockhart of Lee and Carnwath, Count Lockhart-Wishart (Wischeart) of the Holy Roman Empire (1727 – 6 February 1790) was a Scottish aristocrat with a successful military career.

== Early years ==
James Lockhart was born in Lanarkshire, Scotland, the second son of a prominent Jacobite family, the Lockharts of Carnwath. His grandfather, George Lockhart, was the Scottish agent of James Francis Edward Stuart, the 'Old Pretender', and the author of the posthumously published 'Lockhart Papers'. These documents, including letters and George Lockhart's journal, comprise probably the most important primary source of information on the Jacobite rebellion of 1715.

Lockhart's elder brother, also named George, was the personal aide-de-camp to Charles Edward Stuart, the 'Young Pretender', during the Jacobite rising of 1745. Upon the defeat of the rebellion at the Battle of Culloden, George Lockhart accompanied Prince Charles into exile in Paris. James Lockhart, his younger brother, was 18 years old at the time. As the son of a known Jacobite family—and a second son at that—James's prospects in Britain were bleak. He therefore left Scotland, aged 18, to make his way in the world as a soldier of fortune. His first service was as a common soldier in the army of Nadir Shah, the Shah of Persia. How James found his way to Persia is not known for certain. In A Memoir of the 'Forty-Five', (Chevalier de Johnstone, 1958), a Lockhart is mentioned who is probably James (p. 244). The passage is worth quoting in full:

We were scarcely a musket-shot from the shore, when the captain pointed out to me one of the midshipmen in the boat, of the name of Lockhart, asking me if I knew his family in Scotland. I answered in the negative, telling him that I had never been in any other service than that of Mrs. Gray. I was uneasy lest Mr. Lockhart should have recognized me for, as I had been a schoolfellow of his elder brother and frequently in the house of his father, Mr. Lockhart of Carnwath, he might very possibly have known me. He was about eighteen years of age and had been four years in the navy. His eldest brother, the heir to a considerable estate, had been foolish enough, like so many others, to join the standard of Prince Charles.

The events described take place in Harwich, as the Chevalier is making his escape from England some months after Culloden. While he does not give the Christian name of this midshipman Lockhart, James was in fact eighteen years old when this was written. What is more, his career at sea would help account for his presence some months later in Persia, since the trip overland from Scotland to Persia was exceedingly arduous in 1746.

What immediately followed is not known in detail. Lockhart traveled Europe enlisting in various armies and learning the military arts. Towards the end of the war of the Austrian Succession he enlisted in the Austrian service to fight in the armies of the Empress Maria Theresa. In 1752 he was commissioned a captain of the Grenadier Company of the 33rd Regiment, but it is likely that he served as a common soldier before that.

Lockhart fought, often brilliantly, in a series of battles against the Prussians during the Seven Years' War (1756–1763), including the battle of Prague in 1757. At the battle of Kunersdorf (1759) he was instrumental in turning the tide against the Prussians, securing an Austrian victory. He received promotion after the battle from the commanding officer, Field Marshal Freiherr von Laudon. He was again cited for signal bravery at the battle of Landshut (1761). Lockhart rose rapidly through the ranks of the Austrian army, and became a general in the Austrian service.

== Return to Scotland ==
In 1761 Lockhart resigned his commission and returned to Scotland to deal with problems of succession in the family. His father was ailing, and the Lockhart estates were entailed upon his brother George, still living in exile in Paris. George, however, was attainted with treason for his role in the '45, and the family estates would therefore revert to the Crown upon the death of their father, the elder George Lockhart.

Staging the death of the younger George Lockhart in Paris solved the problem. At his "funeral" a casket full of stones served as his mortal remains. As a result of this successful stratagem, the Lockhart estates at Carnwath in Lanarkshire thereafter passed to James Lockhart upon the death of his father.

== Military service and honours ==
The Empress Maria Theresa ennobled James Lockhart in 1782, after a campaign in Lombardy in the service of her grandson, the Grand Duke of Tuscany. As Count Lockhart-Wischeart of the Holy Roman Empire he thereafter became a favourite of Maria Theresa's successor, the Holy Roman Emperor Joseph II, and an important personage at his Court. Joseph II was a godfather to Lockhart's son, Charles Lockhart, who later inherited the title. Count Lockhart was a Knight of the Order of Maria Theresa and a Gentleman of the Bedchamber to the Emperor Joseph II. He served in the last war the Austrians ever waged against the Turks.

In his later years Lockhart served on the staff of the Duke of Lorraine, who was the Imperial Viceroy to the Austrian Netherlands. He may also have served in his own right as the Governor General of one of the provinces of the Austrian Netherlands. (Johnstone, 1878)

Aside from documentary evidence of Lockhart's service in the Austrian Netherlands, a pair of silver candlesticks he acquired in Brussels in 1782 or later, and had engraved with his personal crest is extant. This engraved crest is surmounted by the five pointed coronet appropriate to Lockhart's title.

The official portrait of Sir James was taken to Sydney Australia where it has resided with his descendants for the last 20 years.

== The Lee Penny ==
Count Lockhart has a connection with Scottish literature and folklore. He owned the Lee Penny, a Lockhart family heirloom and the most famous of the Scottish touch pieces. Sir Walter Scott described the Lee Penny in the preface to The Talisman, his 1825 novel of King Richard the Lion Heart's crusade to the Holy Land. This novel incorporates a fictional magical amulet, or 'Talisman', based upon the history and folklore of the Lee Penny.

The Lee Penny is owned by the present heir of the Lockharts, and is currently housed in a gold and enamel snuffbox presented to Count Lockhart by the Empress Maria Theresa.

== Bibliography ==
- Brown, Kevin (2017) Artist and Patrons: Court Art and Revolution in Brussels at the end of the Ancien Régime, Dutch Crossing, Taylor and Francis.
- Macdonald Lockhart, Simon (1977) Seven Centuries: The History of the Lockharts of Lee and Carnwath, SFM Lockhart, ISBN 0-9505711-0-5
- Szechi, Daniel (2002) George Lockhart of Carnwath 1689 -1727, A Study in Jacobitism, Tuckwell Press Ltd, ISBN 1-86232-132-9
- Johnstone, C.L (1878) The Historical Families of Dunfriesshire and the Border Wars. online Available from http://www.electricscotland.com/history/dumfries/index.htm
- Johnstone, Chevalier de (1958) (Edited with an Introduction by Brian Rawson) A Memoir of the 'Forty-Five, Folio Society, London

== See also ==
- Scottish clan
- Clan Lockhart
- Lockharts of Lee
