= Carluke =

Town in South Lanarkshire, Scotland

Coordinates: 55.734°N 03.834°W

Carluke: Scottish Gaelic: Cathair MoLuaig
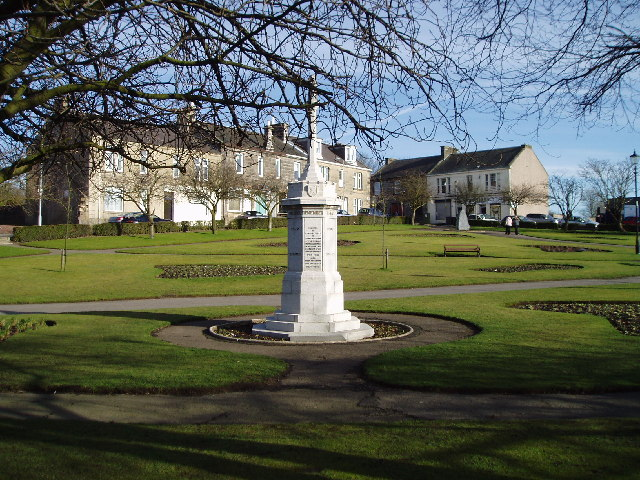
- Carluke Market Square, next to the Town Centre

- Location within South Lanarkshire
- Population: 13,810 (2020)
- OS grid reference: NS848504
  - Edinburgh: 29 1/2 mi (47.5 km)
  - London: 329 mi (529 km)
- Council area: South Lanarkshire
- Lieutenancy area: Lanarkshire
- Country: Scotland
- Sovereign state: United Kingdom
- Post town: CARLUKE
- Postcode district: ML8
- Dialling code: 01555
- Police: Scotland
- Fire: Scottish
- Ambulance: Scottish
- UK Parliament: Lanark and Hamilton East
- Scottish Parliament: Clydesdale

Carluke (/kɑːrˈluːk/; Scottish Gaelic: Cathair MoLuaig) is a town that lies in the heart of the Lanarkshire countryside in South Lanarkshire, Scotland, 4 3/4 miles (7.5 kilometres) northwest of Lanark and 4 1/4 mi (7 km) southeast of Wishaw.

Carluke is largely a commuter town, with a variety of small stores and supermarkets available at its centre. The surrounding villages of Braidwood, Forth, Kilncadzow, and Law are supported by the various shops and services available in Carluke.

== Carluke today ==
Carluke is Clydesdale's largest town with a population of 13,810. It sits on a high plateau overlooking the River Clyde, right in the heart of Lanarkshire's fruit growing area.

It has seen a recent boom in house building thanks to its direct train link with Glasgow. The town centre was redesigned to create an attractive shopping environment, and work finished in 2006.

Thanks to its proximity to Clydesdale's major fruit growers, one of Carluke's biggest employers is the jam company R&W Scott.

Memorials to two of Carluke's most famous sons were completed in 2006 as part of the town's Streetscape Project, regenerating the centre of the town. On the paving at the bottom of the High Street, a design of a compass etched with arrows pointing to places relevant to Carluke such as Tinto and Carluke, New Zealand, has been created in honour of the noted surveyor and cartographer Major General William Roy. Roy's birthplace at Miltonhead is marked with a small memorial plaque (near Miltonhead Farm at the west end of Milton road). Doctor Daniel Reid Rankin is remembered by a plaque in Rankin Square with etchings of fossils carved into the granite.

== History ==
In a charter by Robert I, dated 1315, Carluke is written "Carneluk"; at different periods it appears as Carlowck, Carlowk, Carluk, Carlook, Carlouk and Carluke. Car or Caer tells us that it is a height or strong position and Luke suggests that it may be dedicated to the saint of that name, or the early Christian saint Moluag (or Luag), however there is evidence that the earliest church was dedicated to St. Andrew, and 'Luke' is more likely to derive from the commonly revered pre-Christian deity Lugus.

The town was chartered to Captain Walter Lockhart of Kirkton and spouse as a Burgh of Barony in 1662. Carluke expanded during the industrial age, with work involving corn milling, cotton weaving, coal mining and the manufacture of bricks, glass, confectionery and jam.

== Present day ==
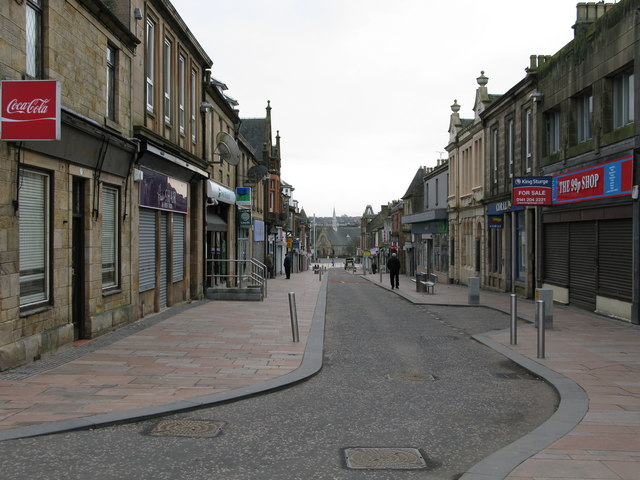
Carluke town centre

Today Carluke's population stands at nearly 14,000 and has 6 primary schools. Carluke Streetscape, a £2.35M town-centre redevelopment project funded by South Lanarkshire Council, was completed in April 2006. As a result, after many years of pedestrianisation, unidirectional vehicular traffic is now permitted along the town's High Street and Hamilton Street outwith business hours. Carluke High School was also redeveloped to make it bigger and more up to date in 2008. In 2010 a £1.1M indoor soft play and cafe "The Bubbles Factory" was built and opened in Hamilton Street, where the "old smiddy" was sited; in 2012 it was voted "The Best Soft Play in the UK". In 2011, a new Tesco store between Lanark Road and Shieldhill Road was constructed and opened.

== Education ==
The town currently has five primary schools: Carluke Primary, High Mill Primary, Kirkton Primary, Crawforddyke Primary, and St Athanasius Primary; all of which have been recently rebuilt or refurbished. Secondary education is provided by Carluke High School, which also serves Law village, Braidwood and Forth. Carluke High School has also been rebuilt on its current site and Kirkton Primary, the last of the schools to be rebuilt, was completed in 2014. Braidwood Primary is a school near Carluke.

Carluke is also home to a state funded Special School, Victoria Park. The school serves the whole of South Lanarkshire Council and provides education for primary and secondary pupils aged 3 to 18 with special educational needs.

== Sport ==
Carluke is home to West of Scotland Football League side Carluke Rovers F.C. who play at the John Cumming Stadium, the field hockey club Clydeside and the Carluke Cobras, one of the top three flag football teams in the UK.

There are also several men's amateur football sides in the town Carluke Thistle & Carluke FC 35's. At youth level there is also Milton Rovers, Carluke United & Carluke Boys Club.

It was the home of one of the most successful Scottish American football teams The Clydesdale Colts . (Nationale Finalists 3 times and Winners once), The Colts were formed by Lex Carson and Harvey Gordon. Their home games were played at Loch Park Stadium. Carluke's Rugby league team is Carluke Tigers.

John Cumming Stadium facilities includes a 400-metre all-weather athletics track and an 11-a-side 3G synthetic football pitch. Situated on the same site, Carluke Leisure Centre facilities include a gym, swimming pool, health suite, creche and coffee shop. Carluke has two lawn bowls clubs, Castlehill Bowling club and Carluke Bowling Club. A concrete outdoor skatepark is located near Crawforddyke primary school, features include quarter pipes, manual pad and bowled section.

== Transport ==
Carluke is situated 6 1/2 miles (10 kilometres) from Junction 8 of the M74, 8 miles (13 km) from Junction 6 of the M8 and 17 miles (27 km) from the M80 at Cumbernauld, and is the meeting place of the A73 and A721 roads. The town also benefits from frequent direct rail services to Lanark, Motherwell and Glasgow and a recently enhanced bi-hourly service to Edinburgh (Sundays excepted) from Carluke railway station, less than a 10-minute walk from the town centre. There is a circular town bus route that connects the town centre with several local housing schemes. There are also regular bus services to Lanark, Wishaw, Motherwell, Hamilton and Glasgow as well as an hourly express coach service to Glasgow that runs non-stop from the outskirts of Motherwell via the M74, M73 and M8 motorways.

== Notable people ==
The town was home to three recipients of the Victoria Cross:

- William Angus
- Thomas Caldwell
- Donald Cameron

It is also the birthplace of:

- Major Thomas Weir, covenanting soldier and alleged warlock
- Major General William Roy, widely regarded as the founding father of the Ordnance Survey
- Joe Dodds, a left-sided defender who played for Celtic, Cowdenbeath, Queen of the South and the Scotland national team
- Dougie Arnott, the former Motherwell striker, currently resides in the town.
- Tom Steele (stuntman).
- John Jackson, racing driver
- John Cumming, footballer for Heart of Midlothian FC and the Scotland national team. The sports facility in the town is named after him.
- David Turnbull, footballer for Celtic and the Scotland national team.
- Angus Grossart, founder, chairman and executive director of Edinburgh-based merchant bank Noble Grossart.

== See also ==
- List of places in South Lanarkshire
