= Fetterlock =

Shackle that is a common charge in heraldry

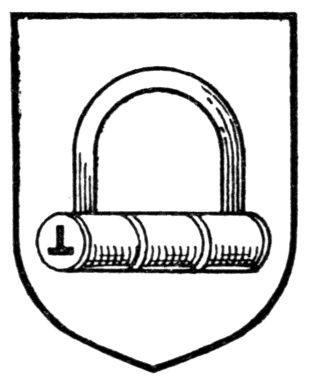
A generic fetterlock, from A. C. Fox-Davies's Complete Guide to Heraldry

Falcon and fetterlock badge of Edward IV

A fetterlock is a sort of shackle that is a common charge in heraldry, often displayed in a way that resembles a padlock.

King Edward IV used a heraldic badge consisting of a fetterlock and a falcon. This was originally the badge of the first Duke of York, Edmund Langley, who used the falcon of the Plantagenets in a golden fetterlock. This was also used by his grandson Richard of York, 3rd Duke of York, who displayed the fetterlock opened.

Fetterlocks feature in the crests of the Wyndham family of Norfolk, the Longe family of Wiltshire and Clan Grierson of the Scottish Lowlands.
