= George Lockhart of Tarbrax =

Son of Sir Allan Lockhart of Cleghorn

George Lockhart of Tarbrax was a son of Sir Allan Lockhart of Cleghorn. He married Anne Lockhart of Tarbrax daughter of Sir James Lockhart of Lee. They lived at Tarbrax Castle and had a son William Lockhart of Tarbrax and a daughter Anne, who became Countess of Aberdeen.

From 1647 he was Commissary of Glasgow, according to the Lockhart papers in the National Archives of Scotland (NAS GD 33 & GD 118); or from May 1646 to October 1658.

Died October 1658.
