= William Ewart Lockhart =

Scottish Victorian painter

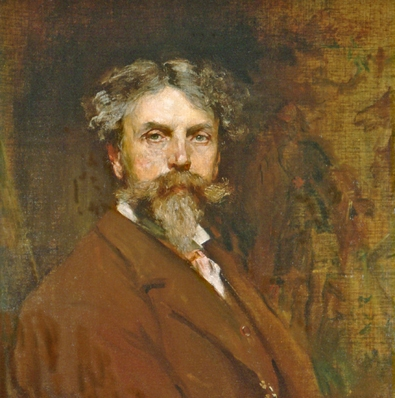
- Self-portrait
- Born: 14 February 1846
- Died: 9 February 1900 (aged 53)
- Education: Royal Scottish Academy
- Known for: Oil
- Notable work: The Jubilee Celebration in Westminster Abbey, June 21, 1887

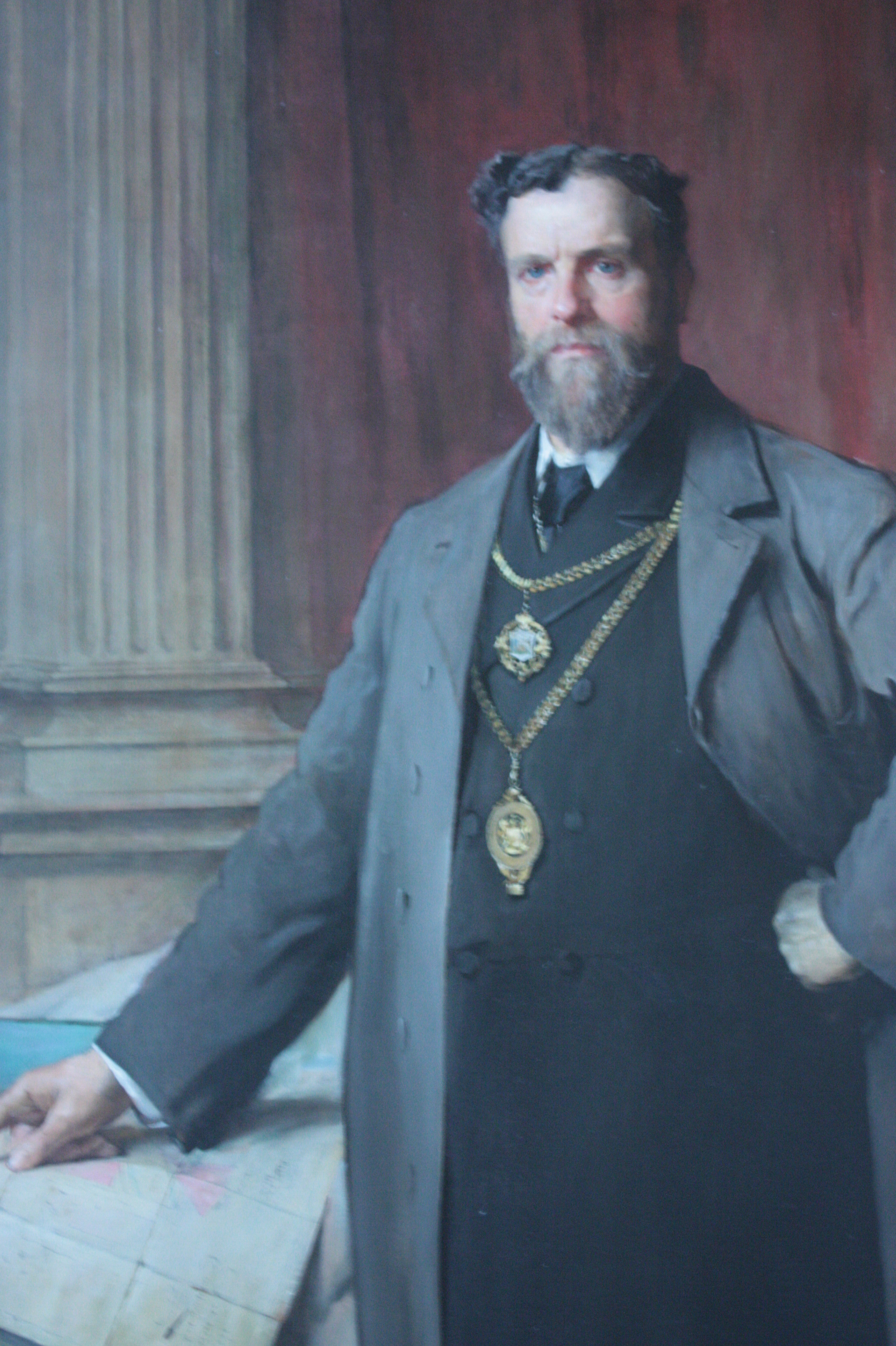
Sir Andrew McDonald by William Ewart Lockhart c.1891 painted in his regalia as Master of the Merchants Hall in Edinburgh, prior to his election as Lord Provost of Edinburgh 1894 to 1897

William Ewart Lockhart RSA (14 February 1846 – 9 February 1900) was a Scottish Victorian painter, born in Eaglesfield and later raised by his grandparents in Sibbaldbie and then Annan.

== Life ==
He learned to draw at Annan Academy and was accepted into training by the Royal Scottish Academy in 1860, where he worked with Mr. J. B. Macdonald R.S.A., By the next year, at only 14 years of age, he was submitting work to the RSA Annual Exhibition. In 1863, his health gave way, and he was sent to Australia.

He settled in Edinburgh, and, in 1867, paid the first of several visits to Spain, where he found material for some of his finest works. In 1871, he was elected an associate of the Royal Scottish Academy, and he was also an associate (1878) of the Royal Watercolour Society, and for some years a member of the Royal Scottish Water-colour Society. He was elected to full membership in the RSA in 1878. After 1861, he continued exhibiting at the RSA Annual Exhibition until his death—with the exception of 1864, when he was in Australia, and 1889–90, when he was at work on the painting The Jubilee Celebration in Westminster Abbey, June 21, 1887, which was commissioned by Queen Victoria and is now in the Royal Collection.

== Assessment ==
His pictures in both oil and water-colour are marked by considerable bravura of execution and much brilliance of colour, but are rather wanting in refinement and subtlety. They are always effective and telling, however, and the 'Jubilee' picture, to which he devoted three years, is one of the ablest works of its kind. On the whole, Spanish and Majorca pictures, such as 'The Cid and the Five Moorish Kings,' 'A Church Lottery in Spain,' 'The Orange Harvest, Majorca,' and 'The Swine-herd' are his best and most characteristic works; of his portraits, those of Lord Peel (bronze medal at the Salon), Mr. A. J. Balfour, and Mr. John Polson may be mentioned. He also painted landscape in water-colour with much success. His portrait of Mr. Balfour is in the Glasgow Corporation Galleries; his 'Swineherd' in the Dundee Gallery; and his diploma a study for 'The Cid' in Edinburgh, while the French government bought the sketch for 'The Jubilee.' The Kepplestone Collection, Aberdeen Art Gallery, includes an autograph portrait of Lockhart.

== Family ==
He married Mary Will, niece of his master, Mr. J. B. Macdonald, on 7 Feb. 1868, and, dying in London on 9 Feb. 1900, after several years of rather indifferent health, was survived by her and five children one son and four daughters.

His eldest daughter Anita Helena Lockhart married the eminent Professor of Medical Jurisprudence, and medical author, Prof Carstairs Cumming Douglas FRSE.
