= Braidwood, South Lanarkshire =

Coordinates: 55.710607°N 3.845609°W

Braidwood
- Location within South Lanarkshire
- Population: 590 (2020)
- Council area: South Lanarkshire
- Lieutenancy area: Lanarkshire
- Country: Scotland
- Sovereign state: United Kingdom
- Post town: LANARK
- Postcode district: ML11
- Dialling code: 01555
- Police: Scotland
- Fire: Scottish
- Ambulance: Scottish
- UK Parliament: Lanark and Hamilton East
- Scottish Parliament: Clydesdale

Braidwood is a small village near Carluke, in South Lanarkshire, Scotland. The medieval barony of Braidwood included the Tower of Hallbar.

Braidwood House, former seat of Lord Clydesmuir, is one of the major local landmarks. Over the years it has been a home for sufferers of cerebral palsy run by Capability Scotland and is now home to the South of Scotland offices of the Forestry Commission. Braidwood House was also briefly home to the Airborne Initiative, formerly of Glengonnar outside Abington, who specialised in outward-bound style training for young offenders. However the programme's funding was subsequently withdrawn by the Scottish Executive in 2004, after the airing of a controversial BBC Scotland documentary Chancers. The building has now fallen into disrepair, but there is still a small animal cemetery in the overgrown house grounds.

Many houses have been built in Braidwood in the past couple of years, primarily on the former sites of the vehicle dismantlers of Alan Gray at Nellfield. New houses have also been constructed opposite the pond beside the Beanshields road by Modern Homes. Another new housing estate is being built by Allanwater at the site of the former Scott's garden centre; with houses expected to be released in autumn 2025.

The "Nellfield Garage" petrol station (now owned by Penny Petroleum) is still functioning along with a shop. The village's sole pub "The Station Inn" reopened in early April 2025 after an £155,000 refurbishment by Heineken-owned Star Pubs.

== Education ==
The village has one primary school which is a feeder to Carluke High School, the school educates some pupils from the village and mostly incomers from Carluke. The architecture of the old school building is noteworthy as it was in the shape of an alien spacecraft. This building was rebuilt to create a larger school in 2014.

== Location ==
The village itself is situated in the Clyde Valley, around 1 mile (1.6 kilometres) from the river Clyde. For a small village it has a good variety of signposted woodland footpaths in the valley, with unusual names such as Fiddler's Gill, and an attractive village duck pond, much used for picnics. Between the Fiddler's Gill footpath and St Oswald's farm there is an abandoned curiosity - the Braidwood telescope - a Lanark amateur astronomer's disused relic.

== See also ==
- List of places in South Lanarkshire
