= James Lockhart of Lee =

Scottish courtier, politician, judge, and commander

Sir James Lockhart, Laird of Lee (1596-1674) was a Scottish courtier, politician and judge, and a royalist commander of the Wars of the Three Kingdoms.

== Life ==
Coat of arms of the Lockharts of Lee: Argent a man’s heart proper within a fetterlock sable, on a chief azure three boar’s heads erased of the first.

He was son of Sir James Lockhart XI of Lee, of a lairdly family, by his wife, Jean Weir of Stonebyres, Lanarkshire. While still a young man he was a gentleman of the privy chamber to Charles I, and was knighted. He sat in the Scottish parliaments of 1630 and 1633 as commissioner for Lanarkshire, and was appointed lord of the articles on 20 June 1633.

Lockhart did not sit in the parliament of 1641, perhaps because of his adherence to the Marquis of Hamilton. In 1644, and again in 1645, he contested Lanarkshire against Sir William Hamilton, and on the second occasion with success: on the first there was a disputed return decided, 5 June 1644, in favour of Hamilton. On 1 February 1645 he was appointed a commissioner of the exchequer, and on 2 July 1646 an ordinary lord of session in succession to Lord Durie the elder, who had died.

Lockhart took part in the engagement for the relief of King Charles in 1648, and under the Marquis of Hamilton commanded a regiment at the battle of Preston. On 16 February 1649, he was deprived of his office by the Act of Classes, and was banished with others by an act of the estates, 4 June 1650. He petitioned for the removal of his sentence of banishment, and on 5 December of the same year his banishment was annulled.

On his return Lockhart became a member of the committee of estates, was chosen to superintend the levy for the invasion of England under Charles II. On 28 August 1651 he was surprised by a party of English parliamentarian soldiers at Blyth, and was made prisoner. He taken to Broughty Castle, and from there to England, where he was eventually placed in the Tower of London.

Several years later Lockhart's son Sir William Lockhart interceded, and he was set free. In 1661 was restored to his seat on the bench, was sworn of the privy council in Scotland, and was again appointed a commissioner of the exchequer. In the parliaments of 1661, 1665, and 1669 be represented Lanarkshire, and was throughout a lord of the articles. In 1662 he opposed the Ejection Act at Glasgow; he was said have been the only man sober in the assembly.

In 1671 Lockhart succeeded John Home, Lord Renton as lord justice clerk, and held that post till he died in May 1674.

== Family ==
Lockhart's first wife was Helen, daughter of Alexander Fairlie of Braid. He then married a maid of honour to Queen Henrietta Maria. With his second wife, Martha, daughter of Sir George Douglas of Mordington, Lockhart had children including:

- William (see above), first son;
- George, the second son., murdered in 1689
- John, of Castle-hill;
- Anne who married George Lockhart of Torbreicks.
- Martha who married Sir William Lindsay of Covington.

== Notes ==
Attribution

This article incorporates text from a publication now in the public domain: Lee, Sidney, ed. (1893). "Lockhart, James". Dictionary of National Biography. Vol. 34. London: Smith, Elder & Co.
