= Simon Locard =

Scottish knight

Sir Symon (Simon) Locard (Lockhart)
- Born: 1300
- Died: 1371; Unknown
- Occupation: Knight
- Spouse: Unknown
- Children: Sir Alexander Lockhart (1350–1444), 3rd of Lee
- Parent: Sir Stephen Locard (d. 1320)

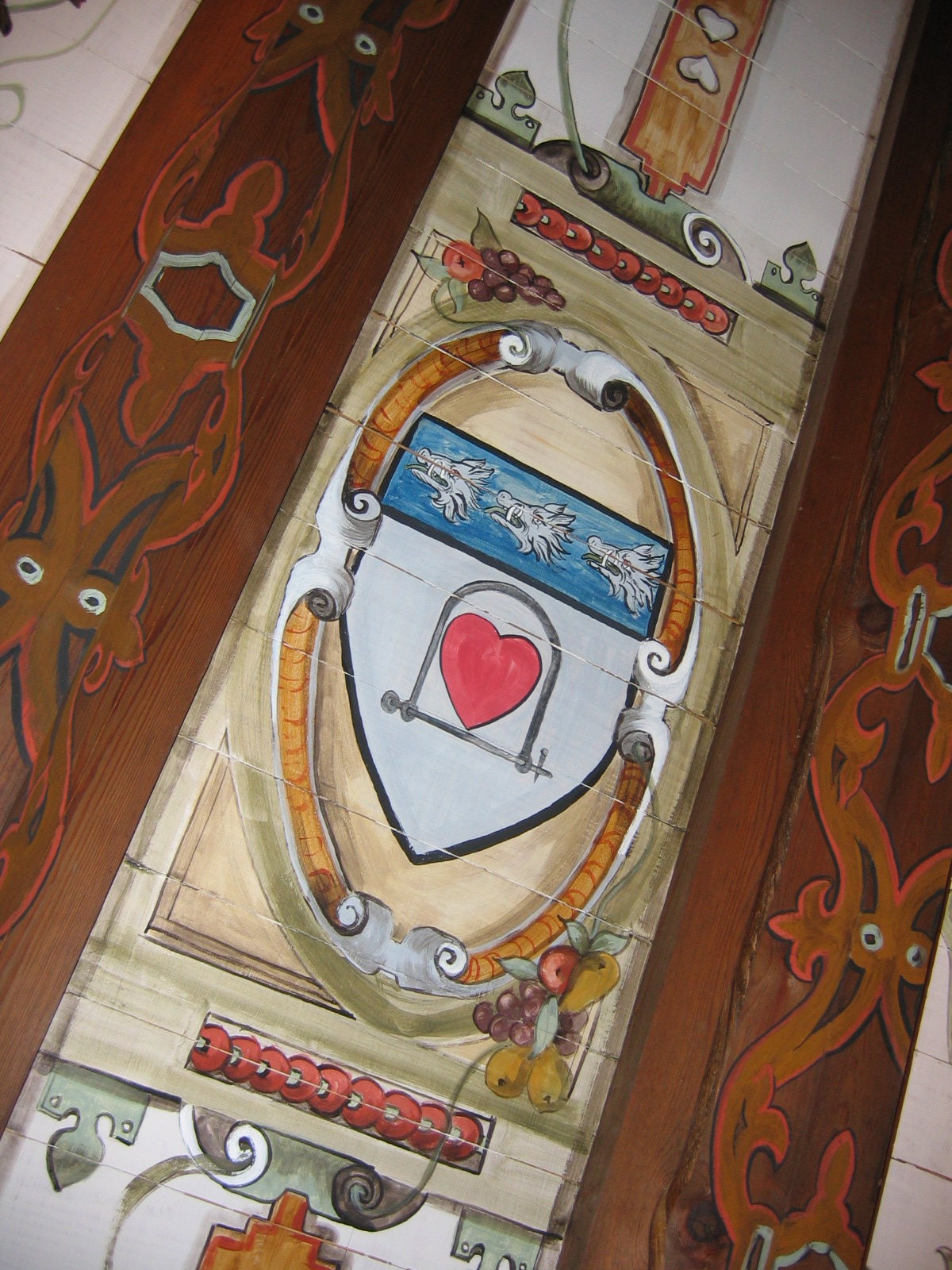
Ceiling painting of the Lockhart arms at the Tower of Hallbar, Lanarkshire

Sir Symon Locard, 2nd of Lee (1300–1371) was a Scottish knight who fought in the Wars of Scottish Independence. According to Lockhart family tradition, he accompanied Sir James Douglas in their curtailed attempt to carry the heart of Robert the Bruce to the Holy Land in 1330.

== Mission to the Holy Land ==
Following the death of Robert the Bruce in 1329, his companion Sir James Douglas (aka the "Black Douglas"), set out to fulfil the King's last wish, that his heart be taken to the Holy Land, to be deposited in the Holy Sepulchre at Jerusalem. King Robert's heart was placed in a silver casket, which was carried by Sir James. It is claimed by a Lockhart family historian that Sir Symon Locard was entrusted with the key:

“In 1329 a band of Scottish knights set out to fulfil the last wish of their dead King. Their leader, Lord James Douglas, carried the King's heart in ‘ane cas of silver fyn, enamilit throu subtilite’ hung about his neck. Beside him rode Sir Symon Locard, carrying the key of the casket. Sir Symon had won fame and distinction in the wars against the English; and now he was entrusted with the key of the precious casket.”.
