= George Lockhart, Lord Carnwath =

Scottish advocate, judge and commissioner to parliament

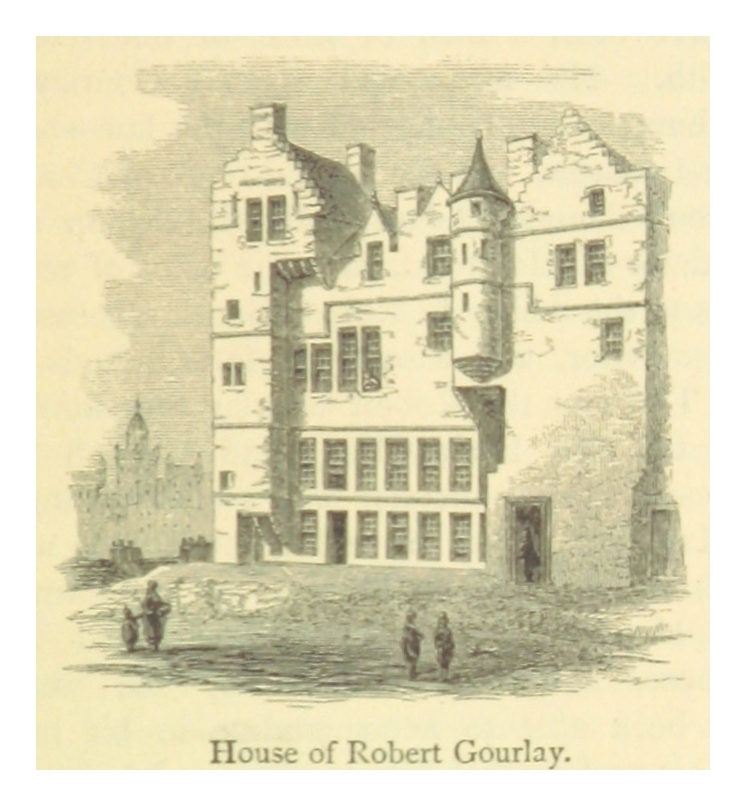
Robert Gourlay's house bought by Lord Carnwath

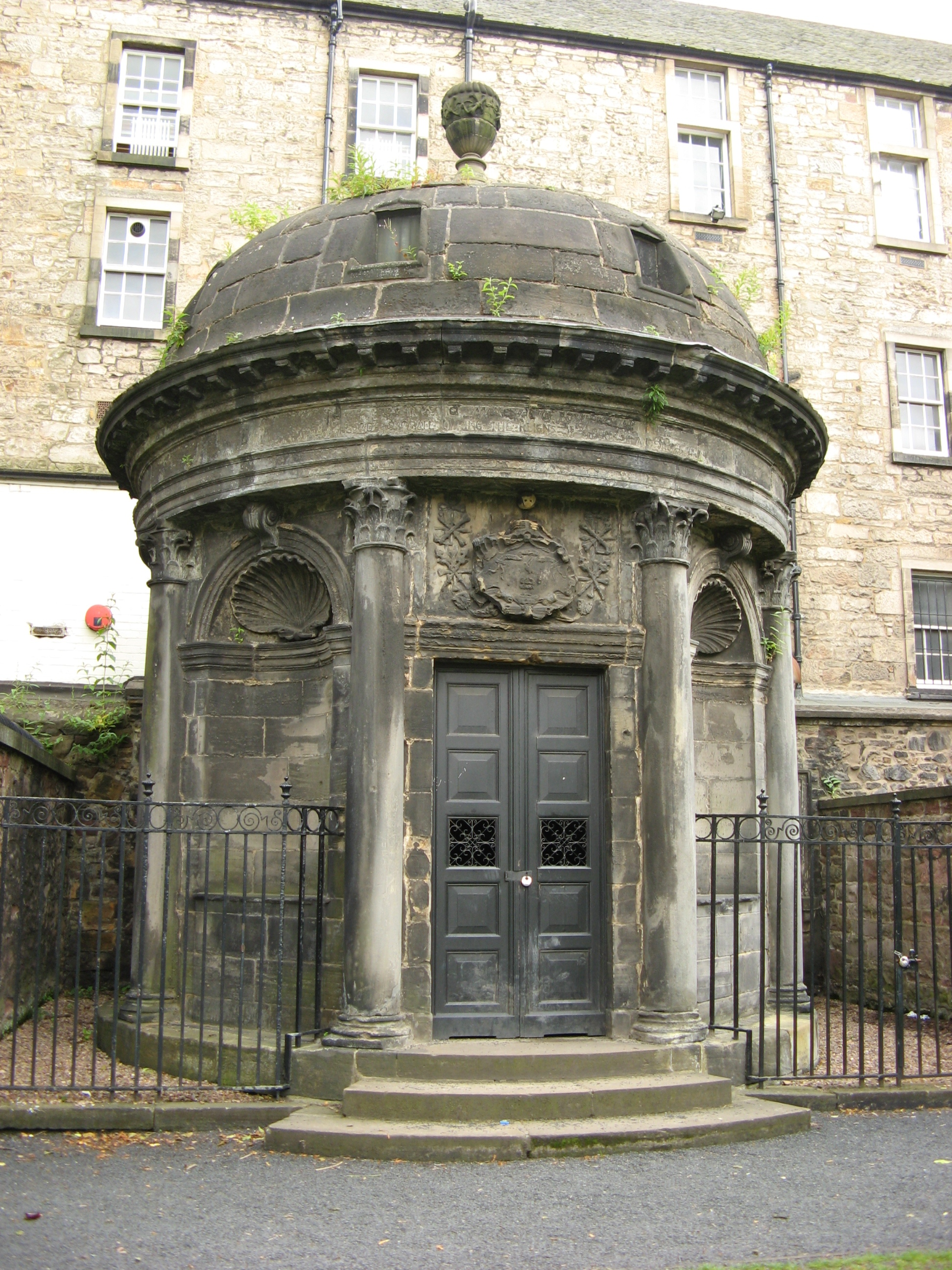
Lockhart is buried in the tomb of Sir George Mackenzie, in Greyfriars Kirkyard.

Sir George Lockhart of Carnwath (c. 1630 – 1689) was a Scottish advocate, judge and commissioner to parliament who was murdered.

== Life ==
Coat of arms Lockhart of Carnwath: Argent a man’s heart proper within a fetterlock sable, on a chief azure three boar’s heads erased of the first, all within a bordure of the fourth charged with five mullets of the field.

In 1644 he purchased from Sir Thomas Hope the mansion of Robert Gourlay on the Royal Mile in Edinburgh, very close to the Law Courts.

The second son of Sir James Lockhart of Lee, laird of Lee, he was admitted as an advocate in 1656. He was knighted in 1663, and was appointed Dean of the Faculty of Advocates in 1672. He was celebrated for his persuasive eloquence. In 1674, when he was disbarred for alleged disrespect to the Court of Session in advising an appeal to parliament, fifty advocates showed their sympathy for him by withdrawing from practice. Lockhart was readmitted in 1676, and became the leading advocate in political trials, in which he usually appeared for the defence.

He lived on Mauchine's Close, previously the home of Sir Thomas Hope (and later swept way by the construction of Melbourne Place on George IV Bridge).

He was a Commissioner to the Scottish Parliament for Lanarkshire in 1681/82 and 1685/86. He was appointed Lord President of the Court of Session in 1685, and a Privy Counsellor and a commissioner of the Exchequer in 1686. Lockhart purchased the extensive estates of the Earls of Carnwath in Lanarkshire, which were inherited by his eldest son, George Lockhart of Lee (1673–1731), whose mother was Philadelphia, daughter of Lord Wharton.

Lockhart was murdered in Edinburgh returning from church on Easter Sunday, 31 March 1689, the service being by William Hay, Bishop of Moray, by John Chieslie of Dalry, the father of Lady Grange, and older brother to Robert Chieslie, a future Lord Provost of Edinburgh. Chiesley had been unhappily married to Margaret Nicholson, mother of their ten children. Margaret took her husband to court for aliment. She was awarded 1,700 merks by Sir George. Furious with the decision, Chiesley decided to kill Lockhart.

The Chiesleys attended the same Easter Sunday service as Lord Carnwath. John followed Lord Carnwath, who was accompanied by his cousins, John Lockhart (Lord Castlehill) and Daniel Lockhart, from St Giles Cathedral, up the Royal Mile a short distance, and down Mauchine's Close to Lockhart's house. Here Chieslie shot him in the back, just outside his house. The assailant made no attempt to escape and confessed at his trial, held before the Lord Provost, Magnus Prince (or Prize), the next day. Two days later he was taken from the Tolbooth to the Mercat Cross on the High Street. His right hand was cut off here, and then nailed onto the gates of West Port. He was then taken to the gibbet at the Gallowlee (the junction of Pilrig Street and Leith Walk) where he was then hanged, and the pistol he had used for the murder was placed round his neck.

Lockhart is buried in the distinctive domed mausoleum of Sir George Mackenzie on the south side of Greyfriars Kirkyard.

Walter Scott used one Lockhart's books, Memoirs Concerning the Affairs of Scotland as a historical source for the setting of his novel the Black Dwarf.

== See also ==
- Rachel Chiesley, Lady Grange

== Sources ==
- Concise Dictionary of National Biography

Preceded by Sir David Falconer of Newton	Lord President of the Court of Session; 1685–1689	Succeeded by James Dalrymple
