= Bridgend Farmhouse Community Project =

Community-owned charitable organization in Edinburgh, Scotland

- Founded: 3 October 2010
- Founders: Will Golding, John Knox, Anna Danby, Sally Swann
- Type: Community owned charitable organisation
- Purpose: To advance community development through the shared ownership of Bridgend Farmhouse and providing opportunities for active citizenship and volunteering
- Location: 41 Old Dalkeith Road, Edinburgh, EH16 4TE, Scotland
- Coordinates: 55.9268°N 3.1538°W
- Region served: South-east Edinburgh
- Website: www.bridgendfarmhouse.org.uk

The Bridgend Farmhouse Community Project in Edinburgh, Scotland is a community-owned and community-run charitable organisation. The project restored an 18th-century farmhouse to provide a community meeting place, café, garden and workshops. The project runs classes, workshops and training courses in a variety of crafts and skills aimed at all age groups. It also provides facilities for performances, gatherings, talks, entertainment and small conferences. Given charitable status under the title Bridgend Inspiring Growth (BIG), the project was one of the first in Scotland to achieve community ownership in an urban setting. In 2018 it became the first organisation in Scotland to transfer from a Scottish Charitable Incorporated Organisation (SCIO) to a Community Benefit Society with charitable status.

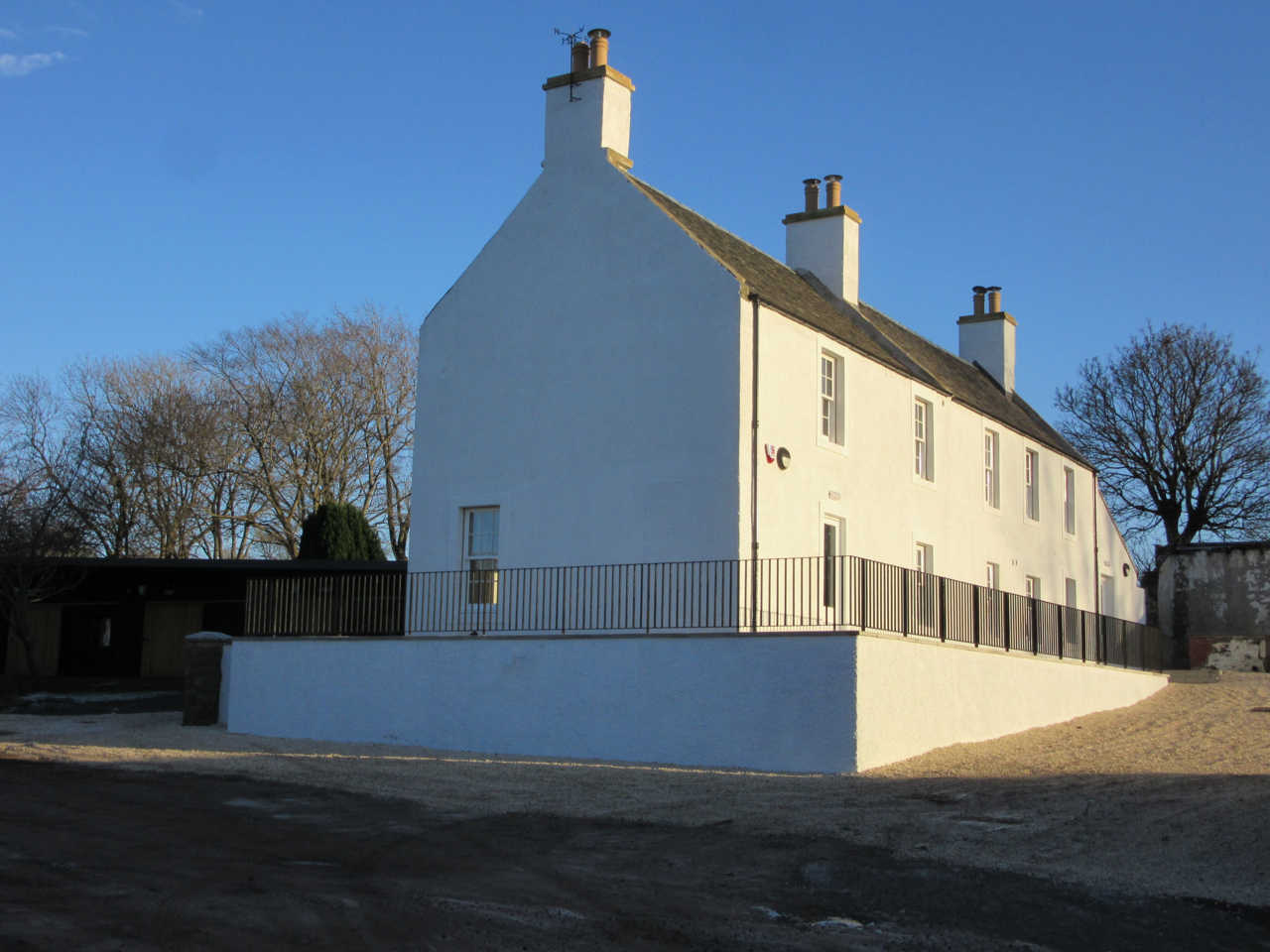
Bridgend Farmhouse

== Site history ==
The site has had buildings since the 16th century, and was once with the royal Forest of Drumselch. According to the 1792 history of the area by the minister of Liberton, Rev Thomas Whyte, James V of Scotland built a hunting lodge on the site, adjoining which was 'a handsome chapel' which was probably built around 1518 by Sir Simon Preston of Craigmillar, whose family owned the estate. The chapel was built 'for the health of the souls' of King James III and King James IV . In the 18th century the chapel building was being used as a stable and this was still the case in 1843, according to Fullarton's Gazetteer. A carved stone from the site, depicting a castle similar to Edinburgh's coat of arms, was reused and set in the wall of Bridgend farmhouse, and is now displayed in the foyer of Inch House. A major archaeological survey of the site in 2014 confirmed there had been a significant building on the chapel site in the medieval period.

The renegade Archibald Wauchope of Niddrie was captured at Bridgend in May 1589 after James VI arrived and broke up the siege of "a stone house within a mile" of Edinburgh. Around this time, the accused witches Agnes Sampson and Barbara Napier met at "Camroune-brig-end" for friendly talks and "hameliness". Agnes Sampson tried to heal the Goodwife of Cameron, who walked with crutches.

The present day farmhouse building dates from the mid 18th century and was extended to its current size early in the 19th. It was originally worked as a mixed dairy and arable farm but in the late 19th century much of the arable land was sold to become Dickson and Co.'s Royal Nursery. When the nursery closed in the 1960s the farm reverted to mixed arable, cattle and pig farming. Latterly the farm was worked by the Binnie family and then the Darling family, who bought the land in 1962 and the house in 1965 until the council bought it in 1998 and the Darling's left in 2000.

A social history project called 'Place, Work, Folk' was carried out between September 2017 and April 2019 to record, share and document the lived memories of Bridgend Farmhouse, funded by the Heritage Lottery Fund.

== Origins ==
The project began in 2010 when a small group of local residents and volunteers at Bridgend Allotments Community Health Inclusion Project, (later Bridgend Growing Communities) held a public meeting to discuss restoring the farmhouse, by then derelict and crumbling, into a community hub. Planning took inspiration from the Edinburgh social reformer and town planner Sir Patrick Geddes, adopting his ethos of 'work, place, folk'. In 2010 the group set up the charity Bridgend Inspiring Growth (Charity number SC042769), with the aim of turning the farmhouse and its grounds into a community centre focusing on the environment and outdoors and which would offer opportunities for learning, training and community development. Four years of consultation and planning for outreach, engagement events and community development followed. Malcolm Fraser gave design advice and the Glass-House Community Led Design charity advised on how community engagement activities might be developed around the design of the farmhouse, and held a workshop to progress this further. A community development officer was appointed in 2013 to set up outreach programmes in the nearby Craigmillar/ Niddrie and Inch/Moredun areas. The charity was awarded grants from Historic Environment Scotland and the City of Edinburgh Council. In 2014 funding was obtained from the Growing Community Assets programme of the Big Lottery Fund (BLF) to scope and further develop this idea and prepare an application for major BLF funding. The property was owned at this stage by the City of Edinburgh Council who in 2014 agreed to give Bridgend Inspiring Growth a years 'license to use' the property. At that point weekly volunteer activity sessions started to transform the derelict site. The charity received grants towards community development work from City of Edinburgh Council and others.

In 2015 City of Edinburgh Council agreed to transfer the land and Bridgend Farmhouse to BIG for £1 in one of the first cases of urban asset transfer in Scotland. This was after the council had received 14 offers for the property, the highest being £215,000. This transfer took place before the Community Empowerment (Scotland) Act 2015 came into force in Scotland. The title deeds ensured that the land and building must, in perpetuity, always and only be used as a community centre for learning, eating and exercise.

In 2015 the charity received a grant of over £1 million from the Big Lottery Fund and further grants from the Robertson Trust and Historic Environment Scotland. Bridgend farm opened as a community centre on 24 March 2018.

== Restoration ==
The design was developed over years of consultation with BIG and the wider community. This involved community-led design workshops and focus group discussions.

The intention was a sympathetic restoration, reinstating traditional historic features such as the chimney stacks and sash and case windows. It included the addition of four community workshops which were built to look like traditional farm stable barns. The Farmhouse was kept true to its original structure, and many internal features such as timber roof beams, the window shutter panels, and original staircase and handrail being retained.

Malcolm Fraser was the architect of the Bridgend Farmhouse restoration, with the design completed by Malcolm Fraser Architects and delivered by Halliday Fraser Munro, The design team was completed by quantity surveyors David Adamson Group, structural engineers Elliot & Co, services engineer Harley Haddow and project manager Graham Harper. Cornhill Building Services were engaged as the main contractors and, with assistance from BIG volunteers in charring and cladding on the workshops, painting and decorating, and building and installing furniture and features, delivered the restored farmhouse to the project in late 2017.

In January 2019 the project was commended for a RIBA MacEwan Award in architecture for 'the common good'.

History of Bridgend Farmhouse is available at the Edinburgh Capital Collections archive and there is an extensive selection of interviews, recordings, photos and stories collected during the Place, Work, Folk community history project in 2017-2019 available here

== Aims ==
The project aims to expand opportunities for learning, healthy eating and exercise to people of all ages living in the nearby estates of Craigmillar, Niddrie, Inch, Moredun and surrounding area.

Specifically the project aims to advance:

- Development opportunities in the surrounding communities. Specifically it seeks to improve citizenship skills. It aims to provide opportunities for volunteers and to provide education and training in outdoor skills and improve understanding of the environment.
- Healthy living, promoting healthier lifestyle choices to improve physical and psychological health. It also aims to reduce social isolation by providing a welcoming social environment
- Understanding of the history of the area and its heritage.
- Equality of opportunity and promotion of diversity.
- Awareness and increased use of Craigmillar Castle park, and provide education about and increase awareness of biodiversity and protection of the environment.

== Facilities ==
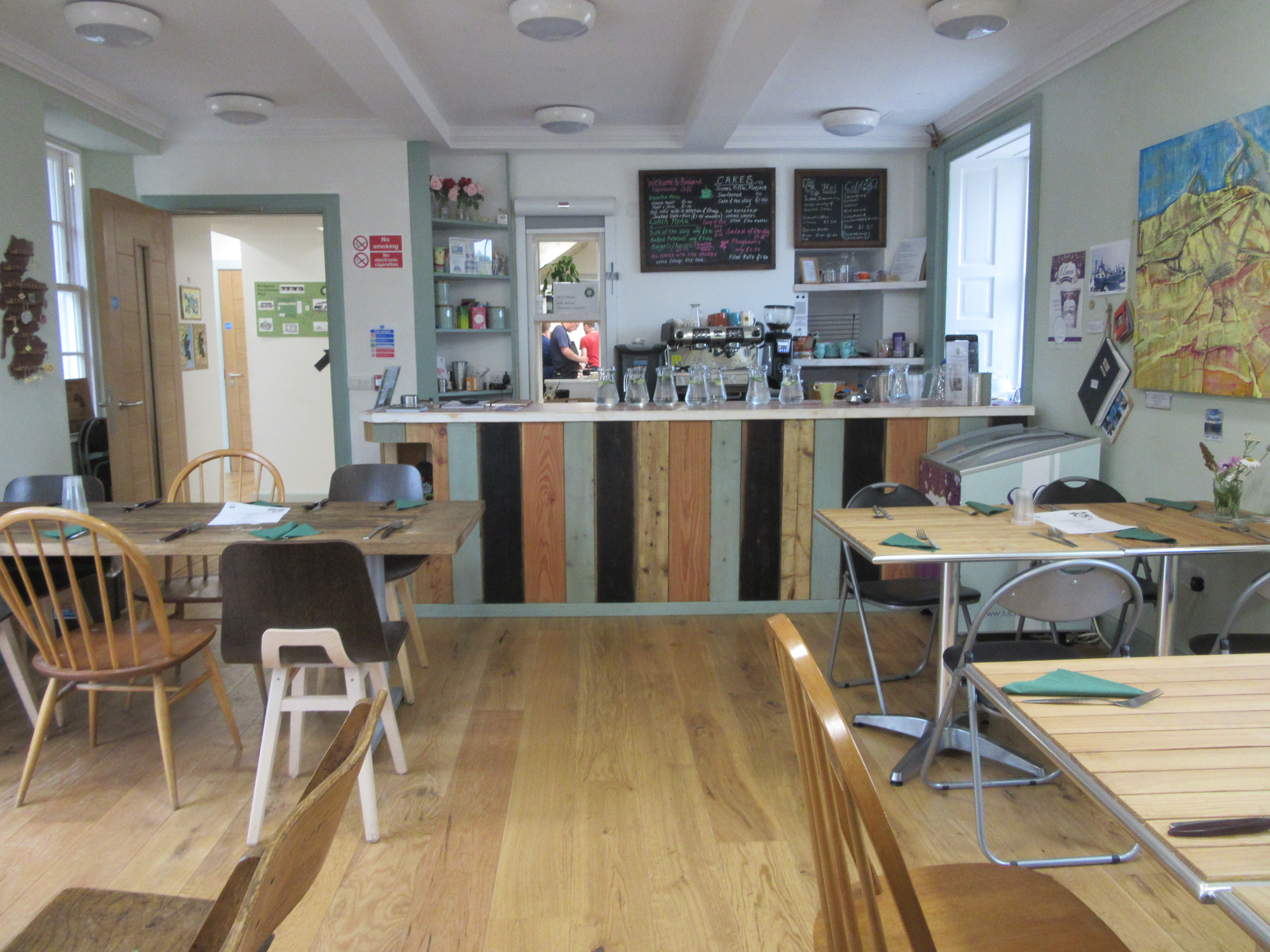
Bridgend Farmhouse Cafe

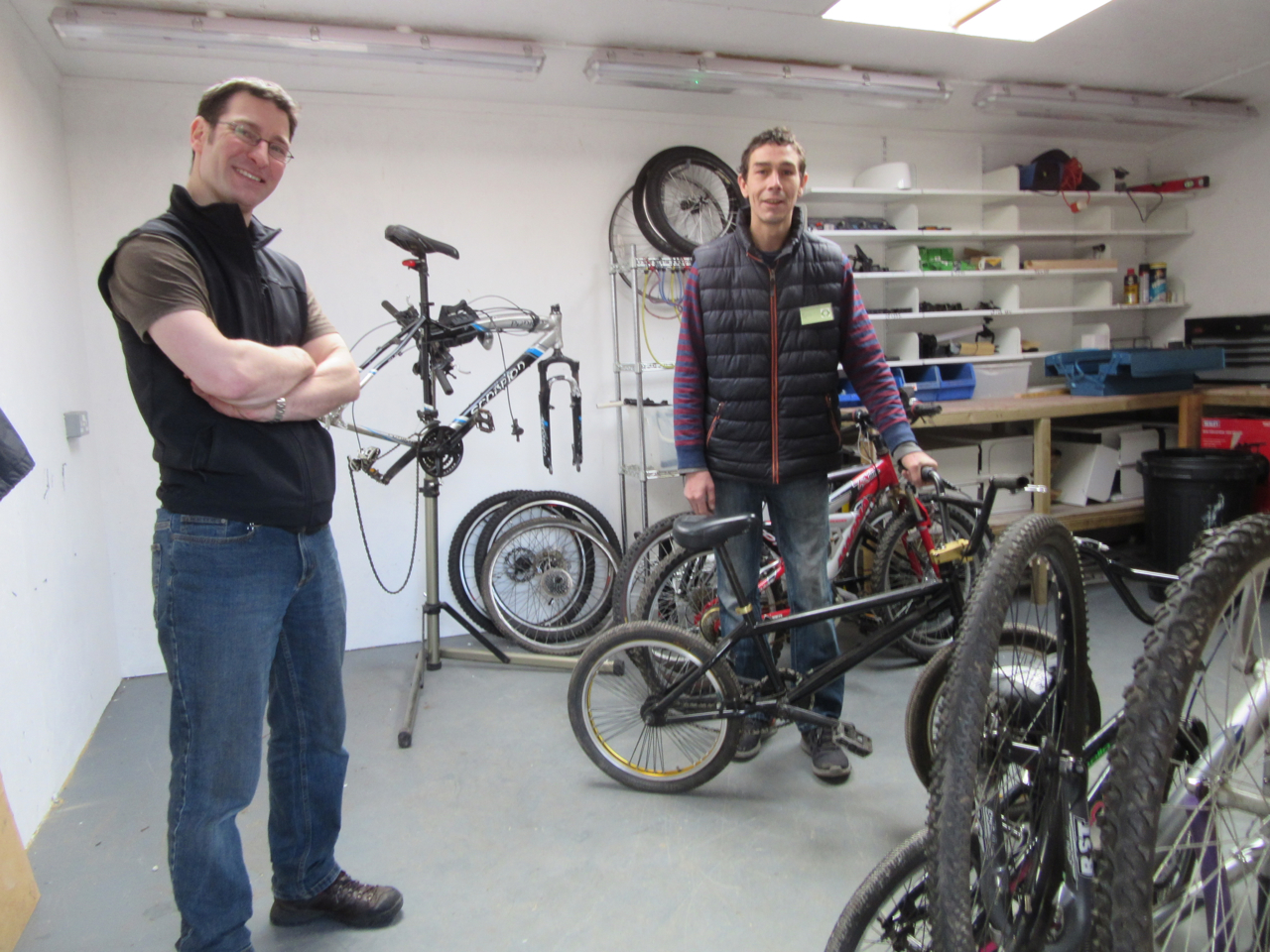
Bridgend Bike Shed

Facilities on the site include:

- An outdoor education workshop
- A bicycle workshop
- An arts and crafts workshop
- A DIY workshop
- An exhibition/meeting room
- Outdoor stage and performance area
- A kitchen garden
- A mindfulness garden
- An eco-bothy
- An outdoor play area
- External barns
- A community café
- A training kitchen

== Activities ==
Activities and projects include 'Place, Work, Folk' a local history project, which includes creating a collection of oral history recordings from local residents. There are two open volunteer activity sessions every Wednesday and Sunday which involve gardening, building, woodwork, landscaping, arts and crafts, cooking and other group activities. The café kitchen provides training courses which can lead to qualifications in The Royal Environmental Health Institute of Scotland (REHIS) Food Hygiene, and Health & Nutrition. Courses can be completed toward a Scottish Qualification Award (SQA) in Working With Others. There is also a project called 'Real Fast Food' which involves preparing healthy locally grown food and delivering it to people who are unable to get out of their house, on an electric powered bike and trailer. There have been courses in crafts, such as lime mortar pointing and gardening. Other courses have included "Making natural cosmetics", "Forest skills", and "Intergenerational storytelling" which created a book of shared stories.

There are regular community groups and classes, including a weekly singing group, craft club and woodwork club.

The project's Acorn Fund supports local people and groups with their own projects on site. These have included "Building a wormery", "Wood carving", "A singing group", "A seed library", "Film & media training for volunteers" and "Medicinal dhal workshops."

== Partnerships ==
Bridgend Inspiring Growth has, or has had, collaborative partnerships with the following organisations:

=== Charitable organisations ===
- Patrick Geddes Centre
- Health in Mind
- Arts in Healthcare
- The Sorted Project
- Crisis
- The Welcoming
- Positive Realities
- The Real Junk Food Project Edinburgh
- Caring in Craigmillar
- Bingham 50+
- Bridgend Growing Communities
- Orchard Project
- Non-stuff Industries
- Teens Plus
- Edinburgh & Lothians Greenspace Trust
- Royal Botanic Garden Edinburgh
- Traditional Arts and Culture Scotland
- Lone Fathers’ Edinburgh

=== Schools ===
- Castlebrae High School
- Niddrie Mill Primary School

=== Universities and Colleges ===
- Edinburgh College
- Newbattle Abbey College
- Edinburgh University

=== Others ===
- Power of Food Festival
- Volunteer Centre, Edinburgh
- Cockburn Association
- Track Scotland
- Scottish Ecological Design Association
- Edinburgh City Council Local Area Coordination teams

== Governance ==
In 2018 BIG became the first organisation in Scotland to transfer from a Scottish Charitable Incorporated Organisation (SCIO) to a Community Benefit Society with Charitable Status (CCBS). Under this model members buy shares to become part-owners of the land and project and each member has one vote. The first Community Share Issue in 2018 raised over £70,000 from 400 members and these members have rights to decide the future of the organisation, vote at the AGM and advise on strategic direction and management.

BIG has a board of twelve trustees all of whom are volunteers. At least 50% of the Trustees must live within the area of benefit and no decision can be made at a Board level without a local majority being present.

The organisation has democratic structures which enable volunteers and members to direct the work of the project. There are four working groups which meet monthly; Buildings and Land, Activities and Events, Food, and Business. These are a monthly forum for volunteers to work together and make collective decisions.

== Awards and recognition ==
In January 2019 the project was commended for a RIBA MacEwan Award in architecture for 'the common good'.

Bridgend Farmhouse was chosen as an example of good practice in the Scottish Government's 'A Connected Scotland; Strategy for tackling social isolation and loneliness and building stronger communities' 2018.

In June 2019 the project received a 'Special Commendation' in the Scottish Council for Voluntary Organisations (SCVO) Charity of the Year awards in the 'Celebrating Communities' category.

In 2020 the project won the Scottish Design Awards national Regeneration Award, the Edinburgh Architectural Association Wood Award, and the Voluntary Arts Scotland Epic Award for the Bridgend Eco-Bothy

In 2021 they received the Queen's Award for Voluntary Service, and were shortlisted for the Scottish Urban Regeneration Forum community-led regeneration award in 2020, and 2021.
