= Gilmour baronets of Craigmillar (1678) =

Escutcheon of the Gilmour baronets of Craigmillar

The Gilmour baronetcy, of Craigmillar in the County of Edinburgh, was created in the Baronetage of Nova Scotia on 1 February 1678 for Alexander Gilmour, son of Sir John Gilmour of Craigmillar and his third wife Margaret Murray, daughter of Sir Alexander Murray, 2nd Baronet of Blackbarony. He was later a commissioner for Edinburghshire in the Parliament of Scotland, from 1690 to 1702.

The 2nd Baronet sat as Member of Parliament for Midlothian, from 1737 to 1750. The title became extinct on the death of the 3rd Baronet in 1792; he had also represented Midlothian, from 1761 to 1774.

== Gilmour baronets, of Craigmillar (1678) ==
- Sir Alexander Gilmour, 1st Baronet (1657–1731)
- Sir Charles Gilmour, 2nd Baronet (died 1750)
- Sir Alexander Gilmour, 3rd Baronet (c. 1735–1792), left no issue by his marriage to Jean Sinclair, daughter of Sir Robert Sinclair, 3rd Baronet of Longformacus.
