= List of community buyouts in Scotland =

This list contains the majority of land under community ownership in Scotland. It includes areas purchased in community buyouts, as well as land gifted or transferred for a nominal fee.

The Land Reform (Scotland) Act 2003 introduced rights for communities to purchase land in their area. The Community Empowerment (Scotland) Act 2015 extended the Community Right to Buy to communities of any size, including those in urban areas. The Land Reform (Scotland) Act 2016 allows ministers to compel landowners to sell if they decide that the sale will further sustainable development in the area. Funding for buying land has been provided by the Scottish Government through the Scottish Land Fund.

Property	Date	Type	Owner	Purchase price	Area		OS grid reference	Notes
Property	Date	Type	Owner	Purchase price	hectares	acres	OS grid reference	Notes
Glendale Estate, Skye	1908	Estate	Glendale Trust		9,300	23,000	NG1749	Purchased by the government, then sold to the crofters
Stornoway Estate, Lewis	1923	Estate	Stornoway Trust	£0	28,000	69,200	NB4232	Gifted by Lord Leverhulme
Macdonald Estate, Skye	Apr 1971	Estate 19,452	Clan Donald Lands Trust		7,871	19,400	NG 6206	The Trust was founded by Clan Donald community members local and worldwide to buyout part of the old Macdonald Estate and preserve the land for future generations of our community.
North Assynt Estate	Feb 1993	Estate	Assynt Crofters' Trust	£300,000	9,000	22,200	NC1032	Previously known as North Lochinver Estate
Eigg	Jun 1997	Island	Isle of Eigg Heritage Trust	£1,500,000	3,000	7,400	NM4786	
Abriachan Forest	Mar 1998	Forest	Abriachan Forest Trust	£152,000	534	1,300	NH5434	Purchased from Forest Enterprise
Knoydart Estate	Mar 1999	Estate	Knoydart Foundation	£750,000	7,000	17,300	NG7703	
Isle Martin, Loch Broom	May 1999	Island	Isle Martin Trust	£0	150	400	NH0999	Gifted by the RSPB
Little Assynt Estate	Nov 2000	Estate	Culag Community Woodland Trust	£244,000	1,200	3,000	NC1526	
Gigha	Mar 2002	Island	Isle of Gigha Heritage Trust	£4,000,000	1,300	3,200	NR6449	
Dùn Coillich, Perthshire	May 2002	Hill	Highland Perthshire Communities Land Trust		420	1,000	NN7653	
North Harris	Mar 2003	Estate	North Harris Trust	£2,200,000	22,500	55,600	NB1010	Increased to 25,000 ha (62,000 acres) with purchase of Loch Seaforth estate in 2006
Aline Community Woodland, Lewis	May 2005	Forest	Erisort Trust		633	1,600	NB2114	
Glencanisp and Drumrunie Estates, Assynt	Jun 2005	Estate	Assynt Foundation	£2,900,000	18,000	44,500	NC1718	
South Uist Estate - Benbecula, Eriskay and South Uist	Nov 2006	Estate	Stòras Uibhist	£4,500,000	38,000	93,900	NF7830	
Langamull and West Ardhu Woodlands, Isle Of Mull	Dec 2006	Forest	North West Mull Community Woodland Company Ltd	£343,000	700	1,700	NM3952 & NM4250	Purchased from Forestry Commission Scotland under the National Forest Land Scheme
Galson Estate, Lewis	Jan 2007	Estate	Urras Oighreachd Ghabhsainn (Galson Estate Trust)	£1,200,000	22,600	55,800	NB4458	
Cultybraggan Camp, Comrie	Sep 2007	Former prisoner of war camp	Comrie Development Trust	£350,000	36	100	NN7619	
Kinloch village, Rùm	Feb 2009	Village	Isle of Rum Community Trust	£0	100	200	NM4099	Transferred from Scottish Natural Heritage
Rhubodach Forest, Bute	Jul 2010	Forest	Bute Community Land Company	£250,000	161	400	NS0273	Larger area of forest bought for £1.475m, then part of it immediately sold for £1.25m
RAF Machrihanish	May 2012	Former air base	Machrihanish Airbase Community Company	£1	409	1,000	NR6622	
Evanton Wood	Aug 2012	Forest	Evanton Wood Community Company	£300,000	65	200	NH5966	
Mull of Galloway	Jul 2013	Heathland	Mull of Galloway Trust	£350,000	12	0	NX1530	Sold by the Northern Lighthouse Board
Bridgend Farmhouse, Edinburgh	Nov 2016	Former farm and steading	Bridgend Inspiring Growth	£1	0.41	0	NT280710	Sold by the City of Edinburgh Council
Portobello Old Parish Church, Edinburgh	Sep 2017	Former Church	Action Porty	£600,000	0.18	0	NT280710	First urban community right to buy in Edinburgh under the LR(S)A 2003 (as amended). Property sold by the Church of Scotland
Ulva	21 June 2018	Island	North West Mull Community Woodland Company	£4,400,000+	2,000	4,900	NM410396	Sold by Jamie Howard after a grant of £4.4 million from the Scottish Government through the Scottish Land Fund
Bonnymuir Green, Aberdeen	Sep 2018	Greenspace and building	Bonnymuir Green Community Trust	£120,000		0.5	NJ922067	Former bowling green
