= Sir Charles Gilmour, 2nd Baronet =

Scottish Whig politician (died 1750)

Sir Charles Gilmour, 2nd Baronet (died 1750), of Craigmillar, Edinburgh, was a Scottish Whig politician who sat in the House of Commons from 1737 to 1750.

Gilmour was the son of Sir Alexander Gilmour, 1st Baronet, of Craigmillar Castle and his wife Grisel Ross, daughter of George Ross, 11th Lord Ross. He succeeded his father on 29 October 1731. In March 1733, he married Jean Sinclair, daughter of Sir Robert Sinclair, 3rd Baronet of Longformacus, Berwick.

Gilmour was returned unopposed as an opposition Whig Member of Parliament for Edinburghshire with the support of Robert Dundas at a by-election on 4 August 1737. He voted against the Government on the Spanish convention in 1739 and on the place bill in 1740. At the 1741 British general election, he was returned unopposed again for Edinburghshire. After the fall of Walpole in 1742, he followed his friend, Lord Tweeddale, the secretary of state for Scotland, through whom he became attached to Tweeddale's leader Carteret, obtaining a place as Paymaster of works from the new Government in July 1742. He was on the court list for the ballot on the committee set up to inquire into Walpole's Administration, but was not elected to it. He voted with the Government on the Hanoverians on 10 December 1742. He was promoted to Lord of Trade in December 1743, but was dismissed. A year later in December 1744 when the Granville government was turned out. He did not vote on the Hanoverians in 1746. By 1747 he had transferred his allegiance to Pelham, and was returned unopposed for Edinburghshire again at the 1747 British general election.

Gilmour died on 9 August 1750, leaving a son Alexander who succeeded to the baronetcy.

Parliament of Great Britain
Preceded by Robert Dundas	Member of Parliament for Edinburghshire; 1737–1750	Succeeded by Robert Balfour-Ramsay
Baronetage of Nova Scotia
Preceded by Alexander Gilmour	Baronet (of Craigmillar); 1731-1750	Succeeded by Alexander Gilmour
