= Cameron Toll =

Suburb south of Edinburgh, Scotland

Coordinates: 55°55′44″N 3°9′42″W

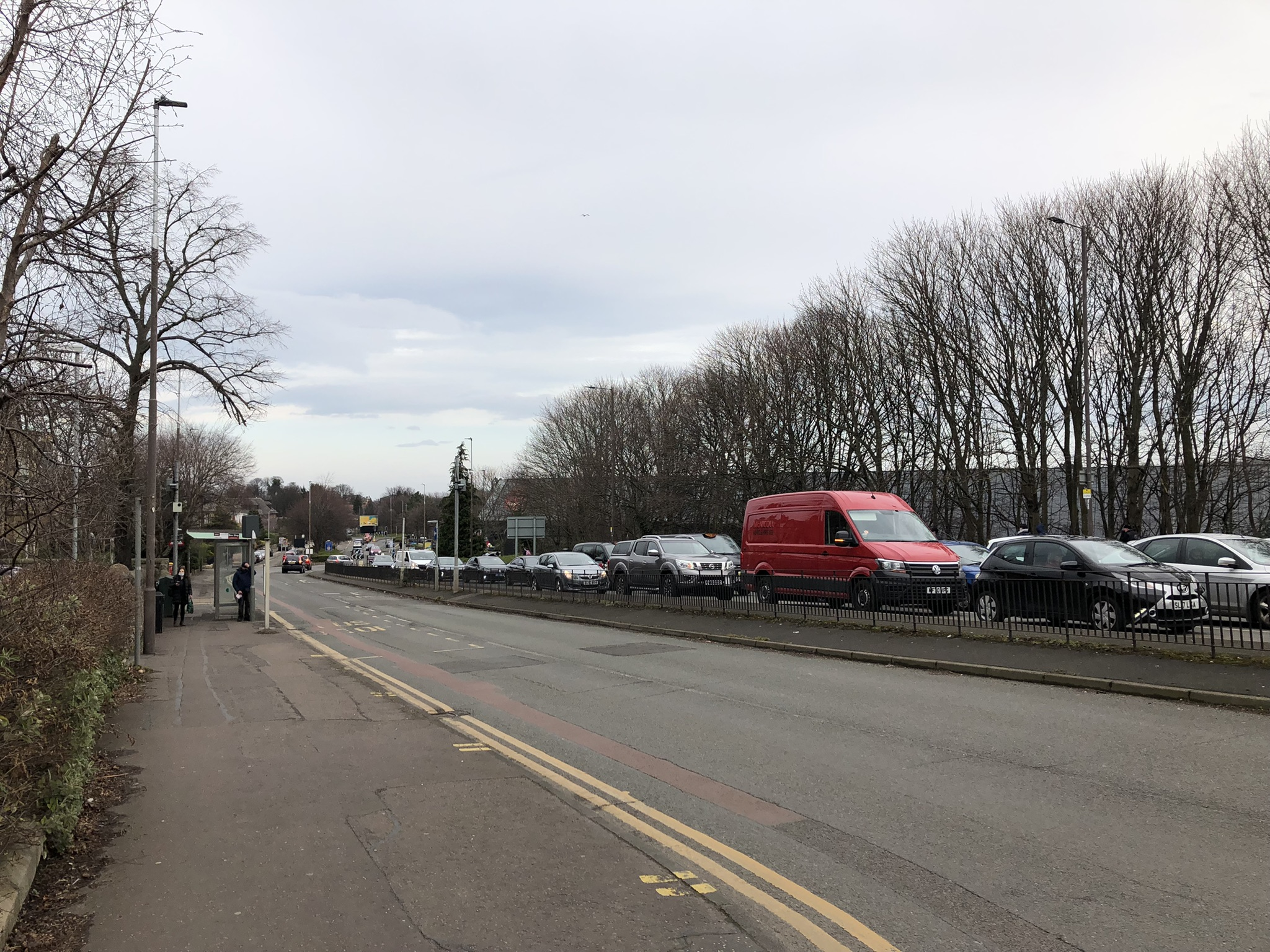
- Lady Road, the main road outside Cameron Toll Shopping Centre, leading to Peffermill Road and Old Dalkeith Road.

- Location within the City of Edinburgh council area Location within Scotland
- Council area: City of Edinburgh
- Country: Scotland
- Sovereign state: United Kingdom
- Post town: EDINBURGH
- Postcode district: EH16
- Dialling code: 0131
- Police: Scotland
- Fire: Scottish
- Ambulance: Scottish

Cameron Toll is a suburb located to the south of Edinburgh, Scotland. Originally it was the site of a toll house built in the early 19th century, which was located on a stretch of road between Edinburgh and Dalkeith. Today the area is home to Cameron Toll Shopping Centre, which opened in 1984. The meaning of the name Cameron is suggested to be 'crooked hill', derived from the Scots Gaelic 'cam', crooked, and Old Irish 'brun' meaning hill, believed to refer to Arthur's Seat clearly visible nearby; the original name may have been Pictish. There are a few small housing estates to the east of the area.

Cameron Toll is 2 miles from Edinburgh city centre, 2 miles from the Edinburgh City Bypass and is served by many bus services to and from Edinburgh and Midlothian. It is close to The Grange and Newington and the area called The Inch.

== Cameron Toll Shopping Centre ==
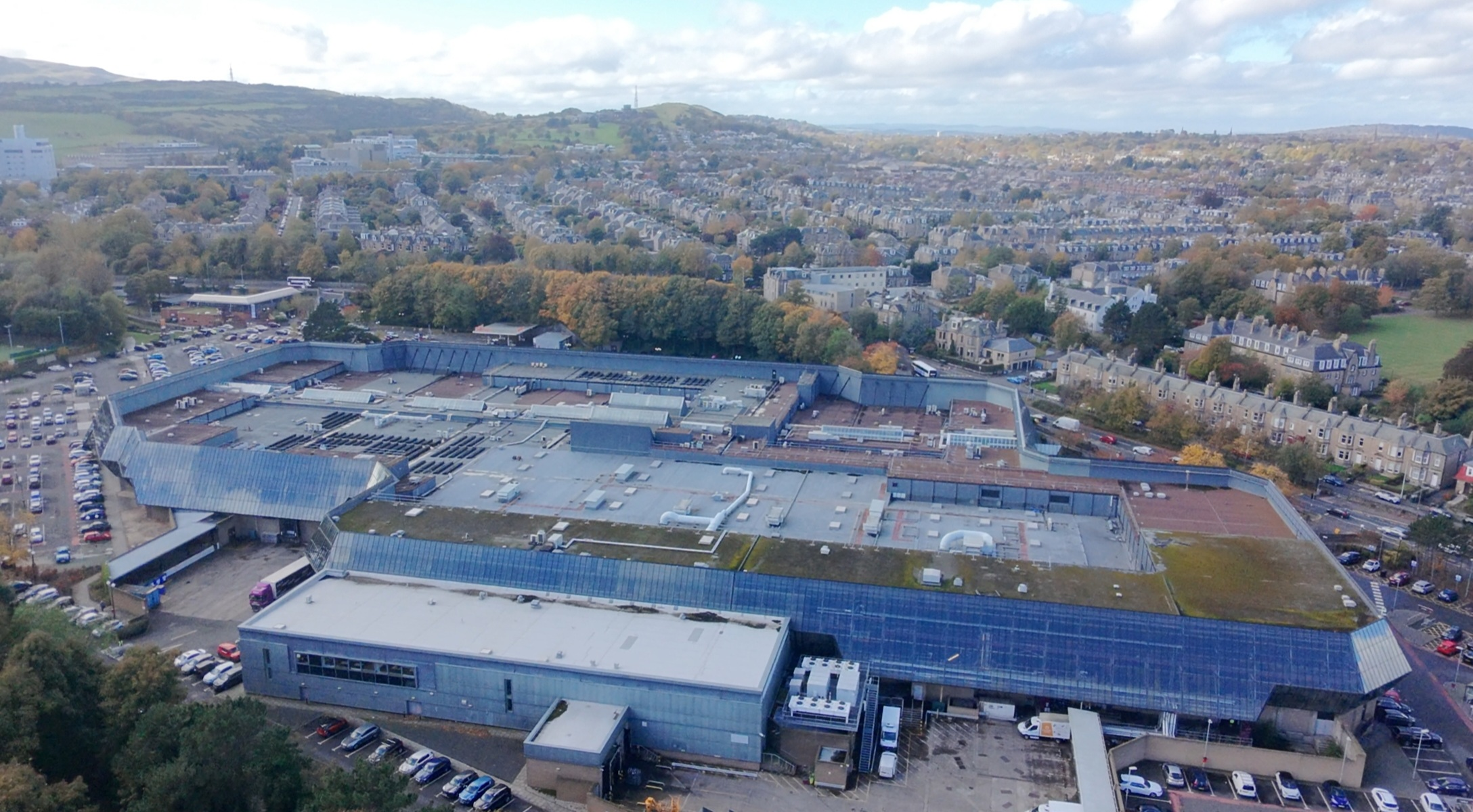
Drone image of Cameron Toll shopping centre.

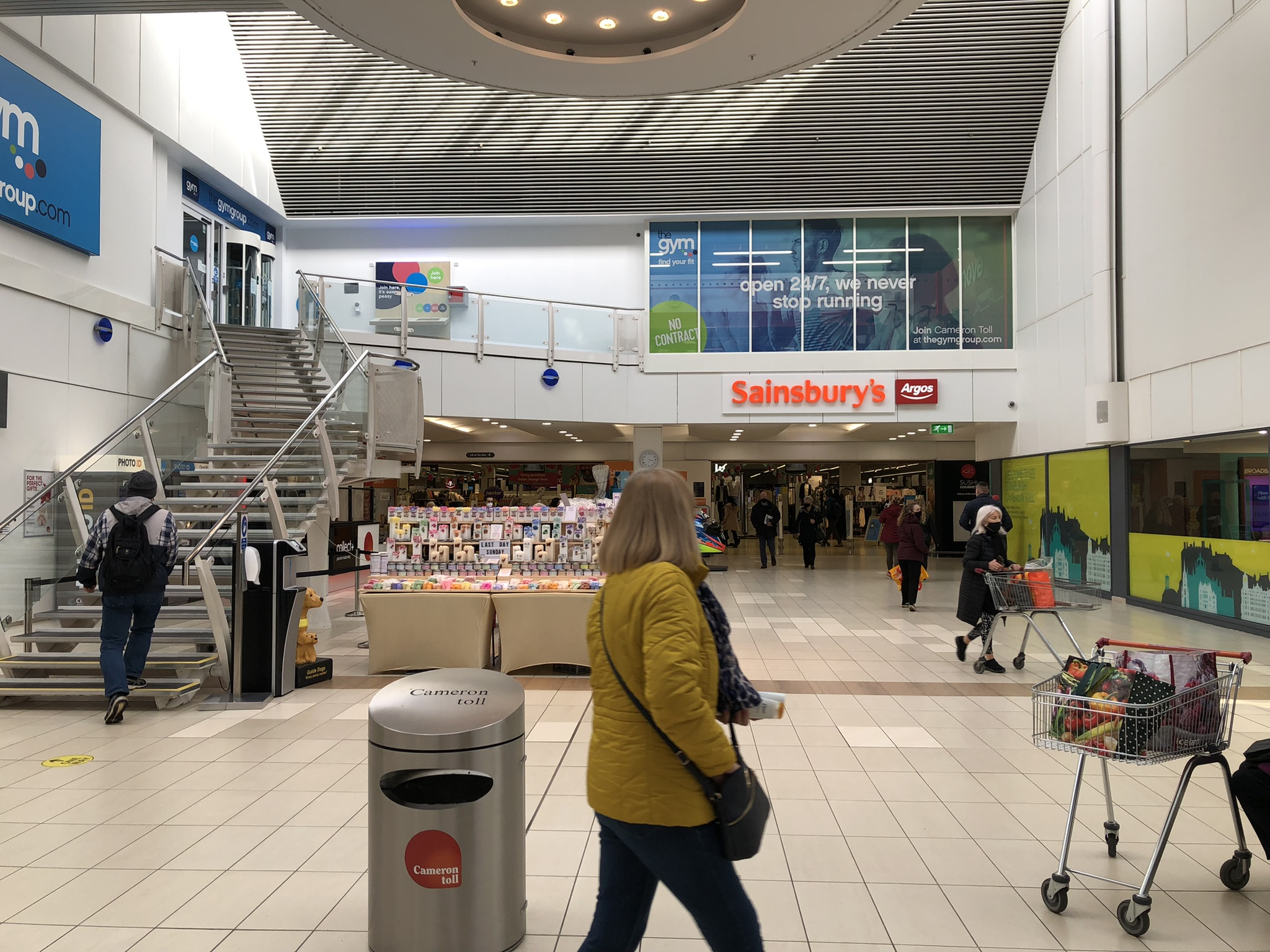
Outside Sainsbury's, in the main area of Cameron Toll Shopping Centre.

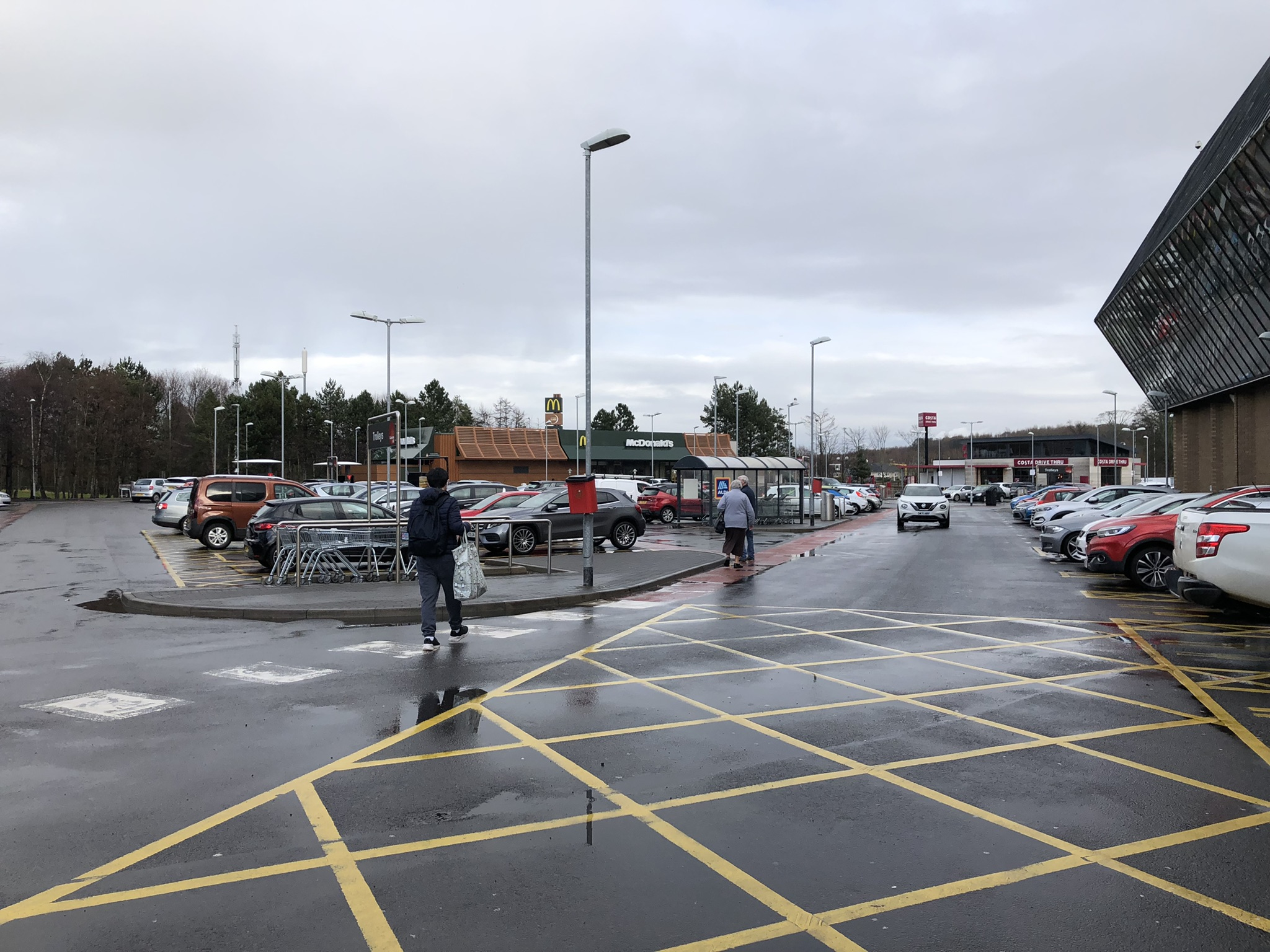
Northeast car park at Cameron Toll, showing the McDonald's and Costa locations.

The area is the location of Cameron Toll Shopping Centre (known as ‘Cammy T's’ to locals), Edinburgh's first out-of-town shopping centre, which opened in 1984 at a cost of £33 million. Built in the former grounds of Inch House between the A7 and A701 roads, the centre occupies a 26-acre site. Cameron Toll had the first ever bank that opened on Sundays in the UK. It also led the way by having lighting which was controlled by a computer system.

The shopping centre includes several amenities, including a post box, a variety of seating and tables in the main hall, free public toilets, a petrol station, bicycle and motorcycle parking, photobooths and a water bottle refill station. The Shopping Centre has a community fund that regularly awards large sums of money to local projects and charitable causes.

The main shops in Cameron Toll are Sainsbury's and Aldi. The centre also includes a Gym Group gym. With construction starting in 2016 and finishing in 2018, The Gym Group opened a brand new gym on the second floor of the centre, fully replacing the food court upstairs. Following the opening of the new gym, the centre changed its opening hours to be 24 hours a day, 7 days a week.

From 2015 to 2018, the shopping centre underwent a major overhaul of the shops and facilities. In September 2016, McDonald's and Costa both completed new drive-thru locations in the northeast car park. In 2017, a new Aldi store was opened, replacing the BHS location that closed in August 2016. Poundland was opened in October 2018, replacing the old Poundworld store that shut down earlier that year.

The Centre originally housed parking for 1158 cars, but after McDonald's and Costa opened their new outlets, parking was reduced to 1028 spaces.

== History of the Braid Burn and flooding ==
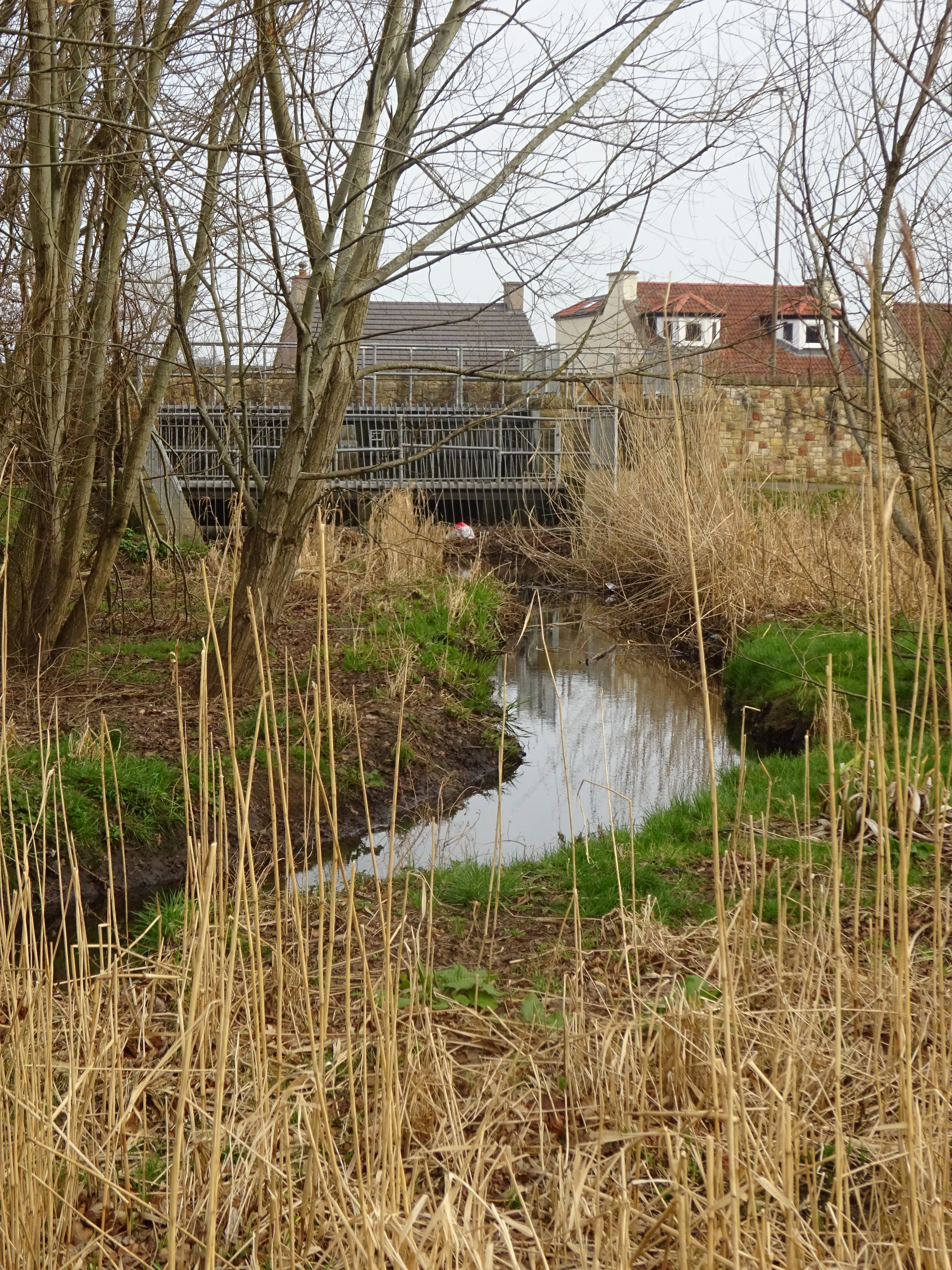
The Braid Burn flows from Inch Park to the Peffermill playing fields

The Braid Burn runs through the area. Agnes Sampson and Barbara Napier, two women accused of witchcraft, met at "Camroune-brig-end" for friendly talks and to "contract hameliness". In 1603, a blacksmith Alexander Neilson lived at the "Lady brig end". To the east are the University of Edinburgh's Peffermill playing fields. Formerly known as the "King's Meadows", these were once part of the royal Forest of Drumselch. The element "end" in the old place names may refer to an ancient forest boundary.

There was flooding at the bridge and causeway called the "Lady Brigend" in the 16th century. This was probably near the present bridge at "Cameron Mill lade". Local inhabitants petitioned the Privy Council of Scotland to repair the bridge and mitigate the flooding in 1595. James VI allowed them to charge a two pence toll to carriers using the bridge to pay for necessary repairs. The rebel Archibald Wauchope of Niddrie was captured nearby at Bridgend on 12 May 1589 by Andrew Edmonstone, after a standoff was ended by James VI of Scotland.

The shopping centre was built on the low-lying flood plain of the Braid Burn, which is culverted for much of its course through this neighbourhood. Flooding of the area took place soon after the centre's opening and has recurred several times: in August 2008 local residents had to deal with metre-high floods. Between 2004 and 2010 the City of Edinburgh Council implemented flood prevention measures along much of the course of the Braid Burn. However the shopping centre and its immediate environs remain a target area for which the Scottish Environment Protection Agency (SEPA) undertakes to provide flood warnings as necessary.

== Liberton Bank House and Conan Doyle Medical Centre ==
Liberton Bank House, now a category C listed building, lies on the south-west corner of the site. Built around 1780, it was occupied by the educational and social reformer Mary Burton from 1844. She was friendly with the Conan Doyle family and the young Arthur Conan Doyle, stayed there with her so that he could be close to his school Newington Academy at 6 Arniston Place, which he attended from 1866 to 1868. It also allowed him some refuge from the influence of his alcoholic father. Since a major restoration by Groves-Raines Architects in 2007 this has housed Dunedin School, which provides secondary education for pupils for whom mainstream education is not appropriate. The Conan Doyle Medical Centre next to it was designed by Richard Murphy Architects and opened in 2007.

== See also ==
- St Margaret's School, which was formerly based nearby.
