= Sir Alexander Gilmour, 3rd Baronet =

18th-century British politician

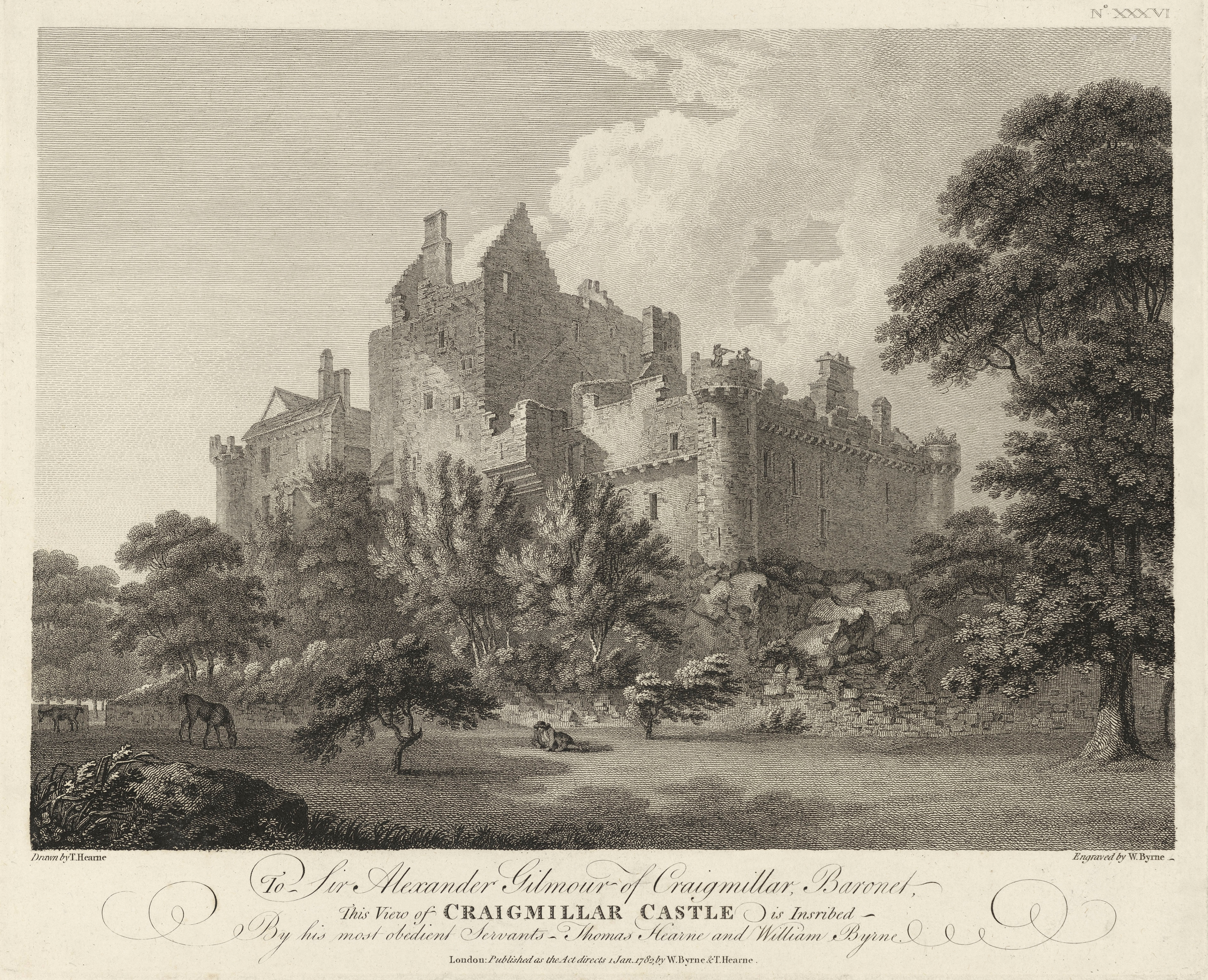
Thomas Hearne and William Byrne's 1782 engraving is dedicated to Sir Alexander Gilmour of Craigmillar Castle

Sir Alexander Gilmour, 3rd Baronet (c. 1737 – 1792), of Craigmillar, Edinburgh was a Member of Parliament for Edinburghshire in 12 January 1761 – 1774.

Parliament of Great Britain
| Preceded by Robert Dundas | Member of Parliament for Edinburghshire; 1761–1774 | Succeeded by Henry Dundas |
Baronetage of England
| Preceded by Charles Gilmour | Baronet (of Craigmillar); 1750–1792 | Extinct |
