= Skene baronets =

Extinct baronetcy in the Baronetage of Nova Scotia

The Skene Baronetcy, of Curriehill, was a title in the Baronetage of Nova Scotia. It was created on 22 February 1628 for James Skene, Lord Curriehill. He was the son of John Skene, Lord Curriehill, Lord Clerk Register and a Lord of Session under the judicial title Lord Curriehill. The title became dormant on the death of the second Baronet in circa 1680.

== Skene baronets, of Curriehill (1628) ==
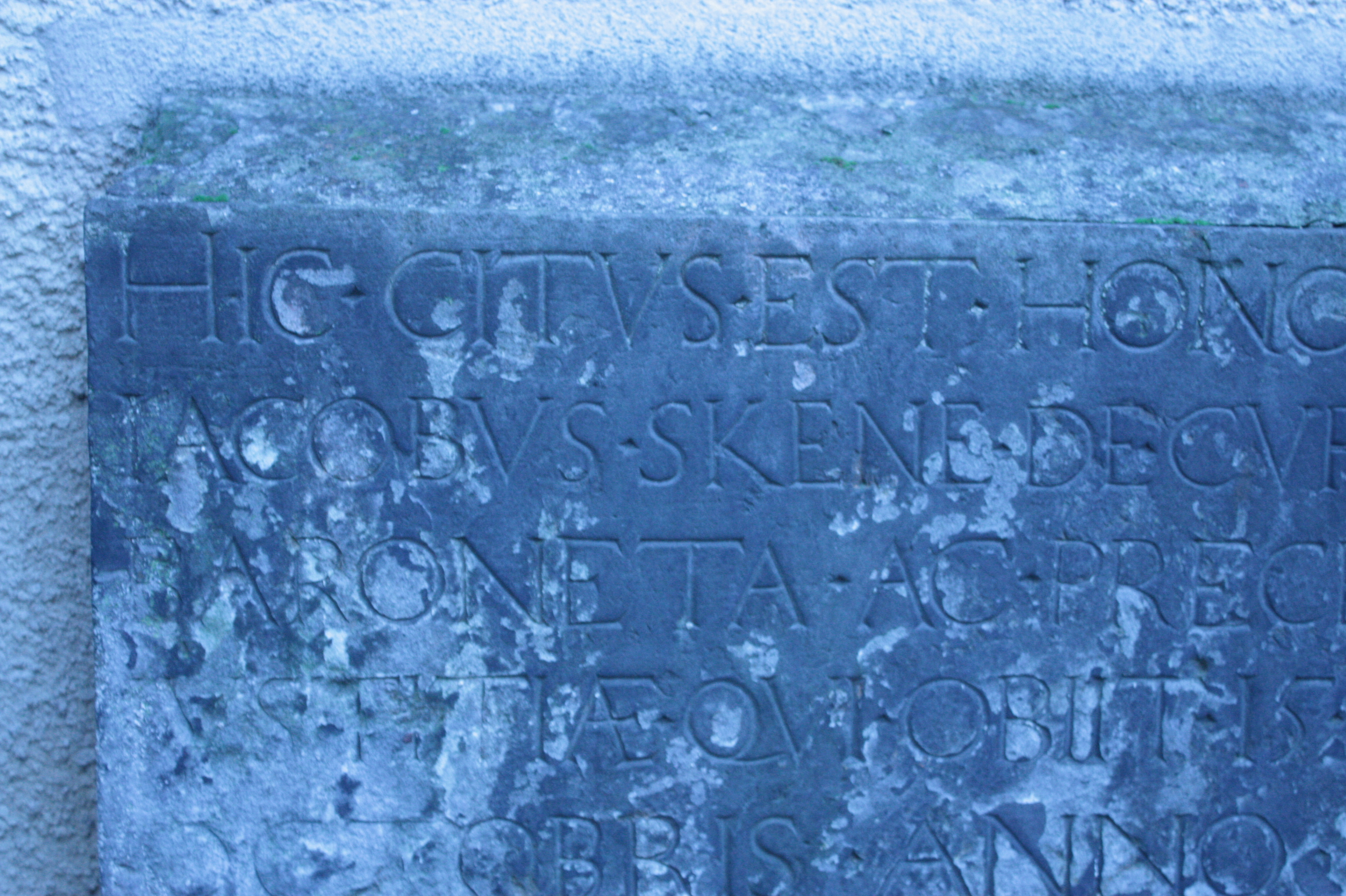
The grave of Sir James Skene, Greyfriars Kirkyard, Edinburgh

- Sir James Skene, 1st Baronet (1579–15 October 1633) buried in Greyfriars Kirkyard
- Sir John Skene, 2nd Baronet (died c. 1680)

== See also ==
- Clan Skene
