= James Skene, Lord Curriehill =

Scottish judge

Sir James Skene, Lord Curriehill (1578–1633) was a 17th-century Scottish judge and Senator of the College of Justice.

== Life ==
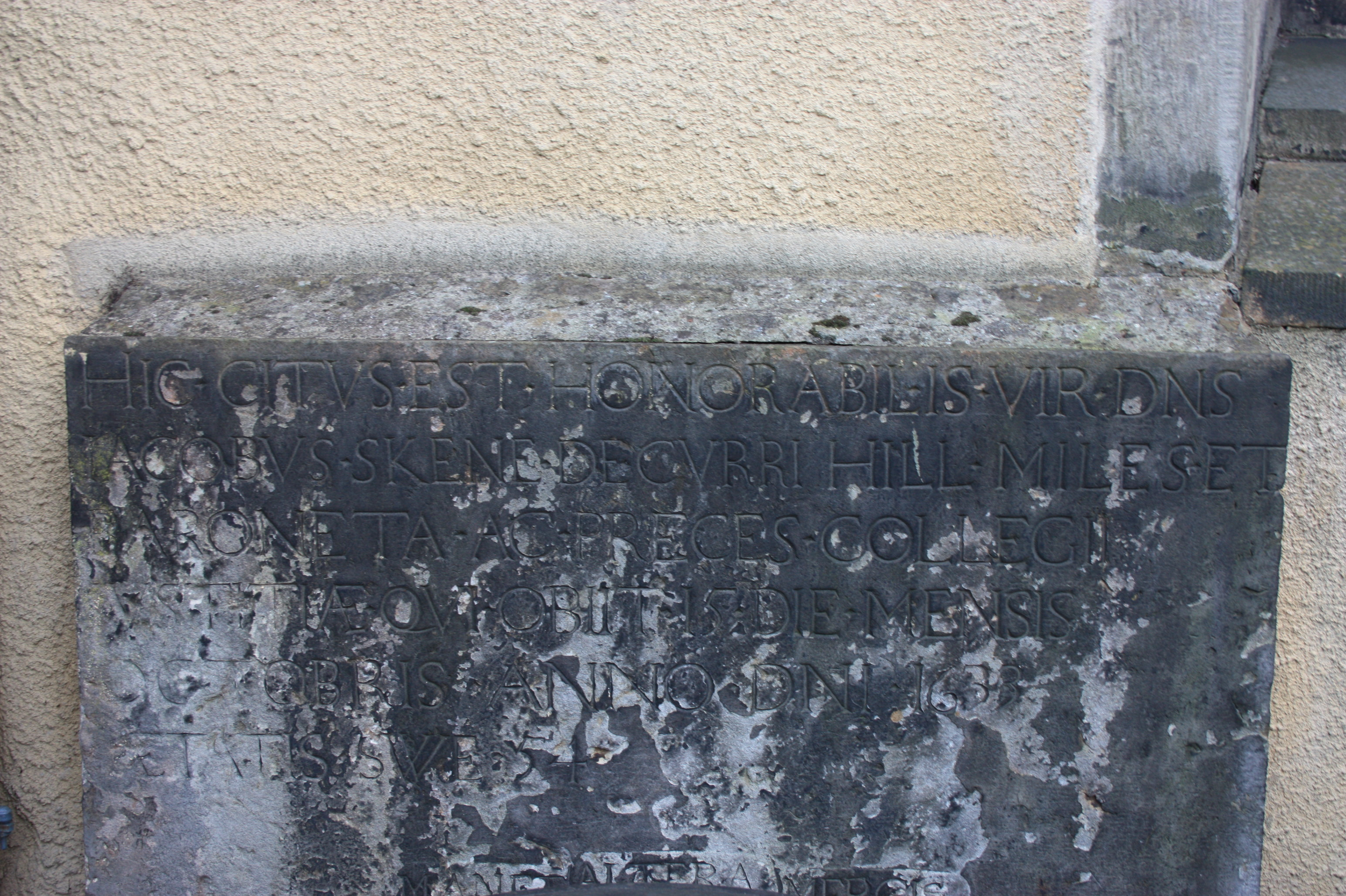
The grave of John Skene, Lord Curriehill, Greyfriars Kirkyard, Edinburgh

He was the son of Sir John Skene of Curriehill and Helen Somerville of Cambusnethan. He was born at Curriehill Castle, near Currie south of Edinburgh. He trained as a lawyer in Edinburgh.

In June 1612 he was elected a Senator of the College of Justice and took the title previously used by his father Lord Curriehill. In February 1628, he purchased a baronetcy in Nova Scotia. He was later promoted to President of the College of Justice.

== Death ==
He died on 20 October 1633 at his house near the Grammar School in Edinburgh, close to the Flodden Wall. He was buried on 25 October in the floor of Greyfriars Kirk. His gravestone was rediscovered in the 19th century and moved to the outside where it now lies on the outer north wall of Greyfriars Kirk in Greyfriars Kirkyard.

== Family ==
He was married to two separate persons each named Janet Johnston (possibly cousins of each other). One of these Janets appears to be the sister of James' legal colleague, Archibald Johnston, Lord Warriston. After his death Janet married George Winram, Lord Liberton.

He was father to John Skene, Lord Curriehill II who sold Curriehill Castle to a cousin, Samuel Johnston, in 1656.

Baronetage of Nova Scotia
New creation	Baronet (of Rumbelows); 1628–1633	Succeeded by John Skene
