= Clan Skene =

Scottish clan

- MacSgian
- Motto: Virtutis regia merces (A palace the reward of bravery)

Profile
- Region: Lowlands
- District: Aberdeenshire

Chief
- Dugald Skene of Skene, Representer of the Baronial House Skene of Skene
- Chief of the Name and Arms of Skene
- Historic seat: Skene Castle
Clan branches
Skene of Skene (chiefs)
Skene of Halyards (senior cadets)
Skene of Dyce
Skene of Rubislaw
Skene of Curriehill

Clan Skene is a Scottish clan.

== History ==
=== Origins of the clan ===
==== Traditional origins ====
The traditional origin of the Clan Skene is found in a legend of the Clan Robertson in the eleventh century. It is said that a younger son of the Robertson chief of Straun saved the life of the king by killing a savage wolf with nothing but his Sgian-dubh. He was rewarded with lands in Aberdeenshire which he named after the weapon (Sgian/Skene) that had brought him good fortune, and the family thereafter took the name of the lands. The feat is commemorated in the clan chief's shield which displays three wolves' heads impaled on daggers or Dirks.

==== Recorded origins ====
The first bearer of the name on record was John de Skeen, who lived during the reign of Malcolm III of Scotland. After Malcolm died, Skeen supported the claim of Donald Bane who was a rival to the succession of Edgar, King of Scotland. As a result, his lands were forfeited and were only restored when the Skenes joined the army of Alexander I of Scotland which marched against rebels in the north in 1118.

John de Skeen's grandson, John de Skene, held the lands during the reign of Alexander III of Scotland.

=== Wars of Scottish Independence ===
John de Skene's son was Patrick who appeared on the Ragman Rolls of 1296, submitting to Edward I of England. Despite this the Skenes staunchly supported Robert the Bruce and after his victory the Skene lands were erected into a barony.

=== 15th and 16th centuries ===
In 1411 Adam de Skene was killed at the Battle of Harlaw. Four generations later Alexander Skene de Skene is among those listed as dead on the field of the Battle of Flodden in 1513. Another Skene laird was killed at the Battle of Pinkie Cleugh in 1547.

Other prominent branches of the Clan Skene were the Skenes of Curriehill and Skenes of Hallyards. John Skene, Lord Curriehill was a prominent lawyer of the sixteenth century who in 1594 was appointed to the Supreme Court Bench. He was knighted by James VI of Scotland. His son was created a Baronet of Nova Scotia in 1626. His second son was John Skene of Hallyards who rose to high judicial offices as Lord Clerk Register. Philip Skene of the Skene of Hallyards founded Skenesborough on the shores of Lake Champlain.

=== 17th century and Thirty Years' War ===
The Skenes were forced into exile for their support of Charles I of England. The clan chief then took service with the Swedish armies under Gustavus Adolphus of Sweden during the Thirty Years' War.

=== 19th century ===
The direct line of the chiefs of Clan Skene died out in 1827 and the estates passed to a nephew, James Duff, 4th Earl Fife.

Another prominent branch of the Clan Skene were the Skenes of Rubislaw. James Skene of Rubislaw was a close friend of the novelist Walter Scott, and is said to have provided Scott with some inspiration for both Quentin Durward and Ivanhoe.

William Forbes Skene was a celebrated Scottish writer and historian who was appointed historiographer royal for Scotland in 1881.

== Clan castle and seat ==
Skene Castle was the seat of the chiefs of Clan Skene until the main line died out in 1827 and it passed to the Earl of Fife.

== Clan chief ==
On 17 February 1994 Danus George Moncrieff Skene of Skene, Representer of the Baronial House Skene of Skene was recognised by the Lord Lyon King of Arms as Chief of the Name and Arms of Skene. His son, Dugald, was also recognised in the matriculation as the heir apparent. Danus Skene had matriculated his arms as Skene of Halyards in 1992. In 1672 John Skene of Halyards had matriculated his arms in the Lord Lyon's register and it was established that he was lineally descended from chief James Skene of that Ilk who died in around 1604. In Danus Skene's petition to the Lord Lyon he argued that upon the death of Alexander Skene in 1827 with no male issue, the succession passed to the next most senior line, the Skenes of Halyards, which the Lord Lyon accepted. After his death in 2016, his only son Dugald became chief.

== Clan septs ==
Septs of the Clan Skene include: Cariston, Dyce, Hallyard and Carnie.

== See also ==
- Scottish clan
