= Gilmour baronets of Edinburgh (1661) =

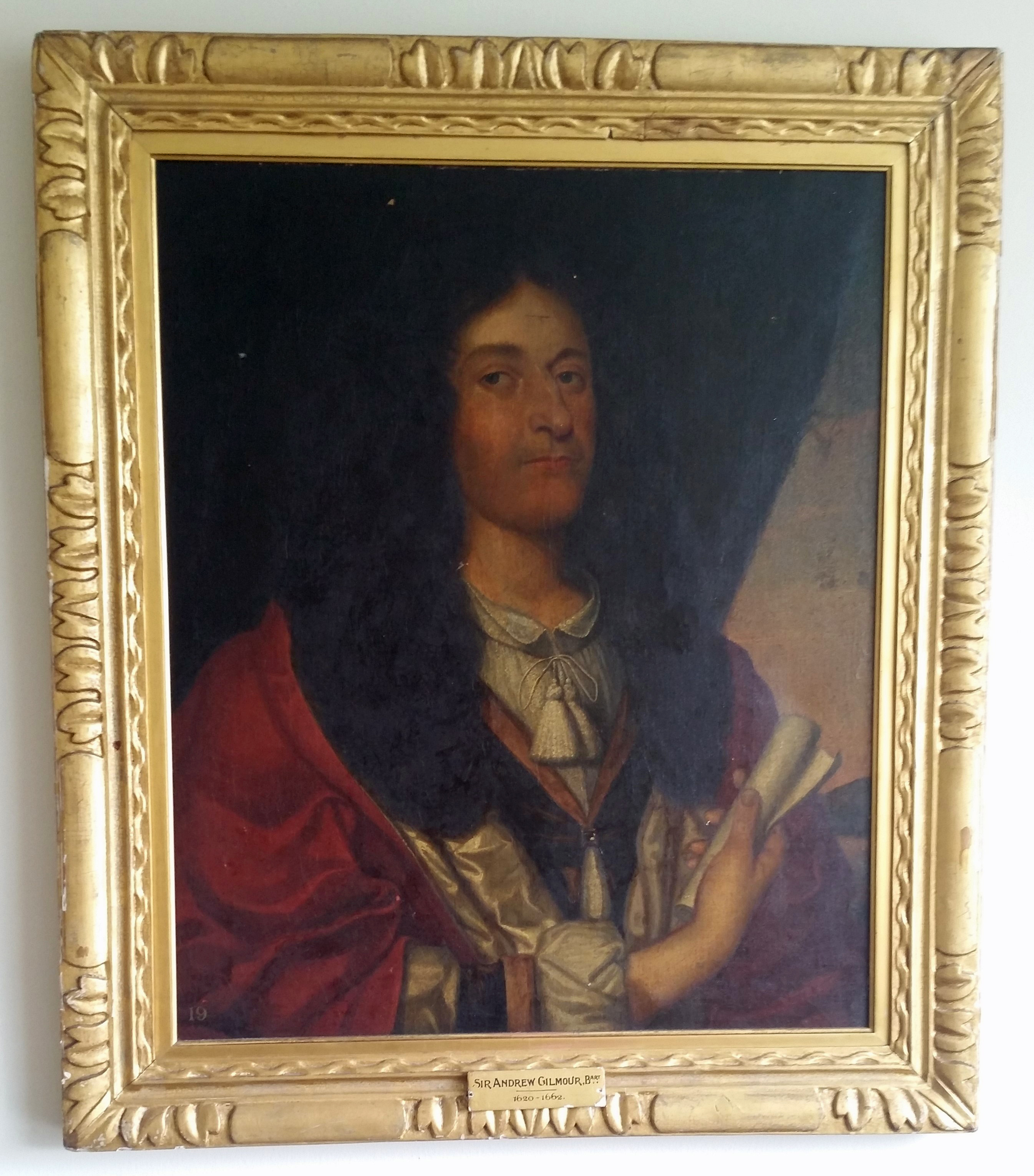

The Gilmour baronetcy, of Edinburgh, was created in the Baronetage of Nova Scotia on 16 August 1661 for the advocate Andrew Gilmour. He was the youngest of three sons of John Gilmour, Writer to the Signet; his elder brother, the Royalist Sir John Gilmour of Craigmillar, had been appointed Lord President of the Court of Session earlier in the year.

The title became extinct on his death from illness in 1663.

== Gilmour baronets, of Edinburgh (1661) ==
- Sir Andrew Gilmour, 1st Baronet (died 1663)
