= George Winram, Lord Liberton =

Scottish politician and judge (1604–1650)

Lord Liberton

Personal details
- Born: George Winram; 1604
- Died: 1650 (aged 45–46)

George Winram (occasionally Windrahame), Lord Liberton (1604–1650) was a 17th-century Scottish judge, politician, soldier and Senator of the College of Justice.

== Life ==
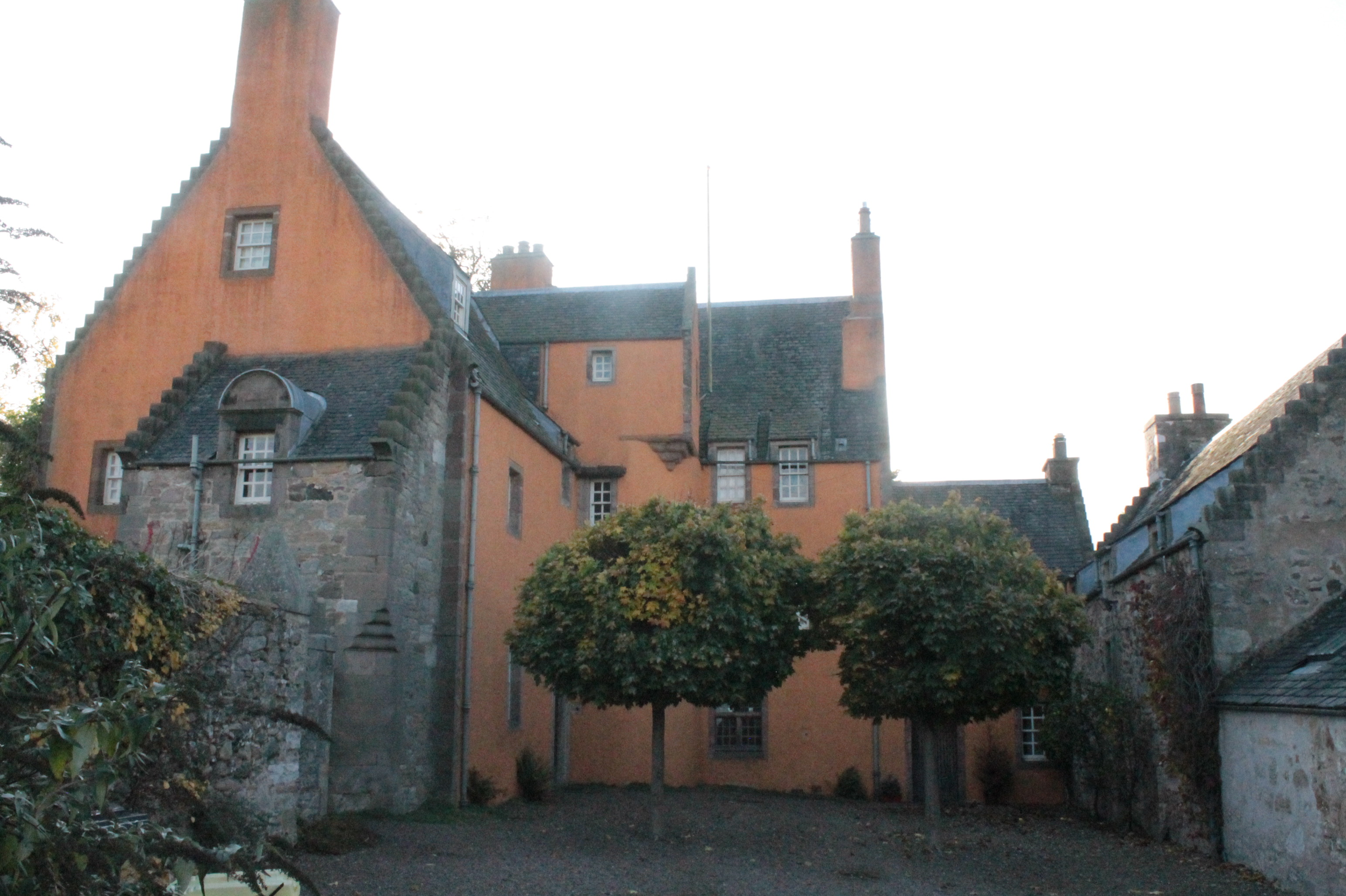
Liberton House, Edinburgh

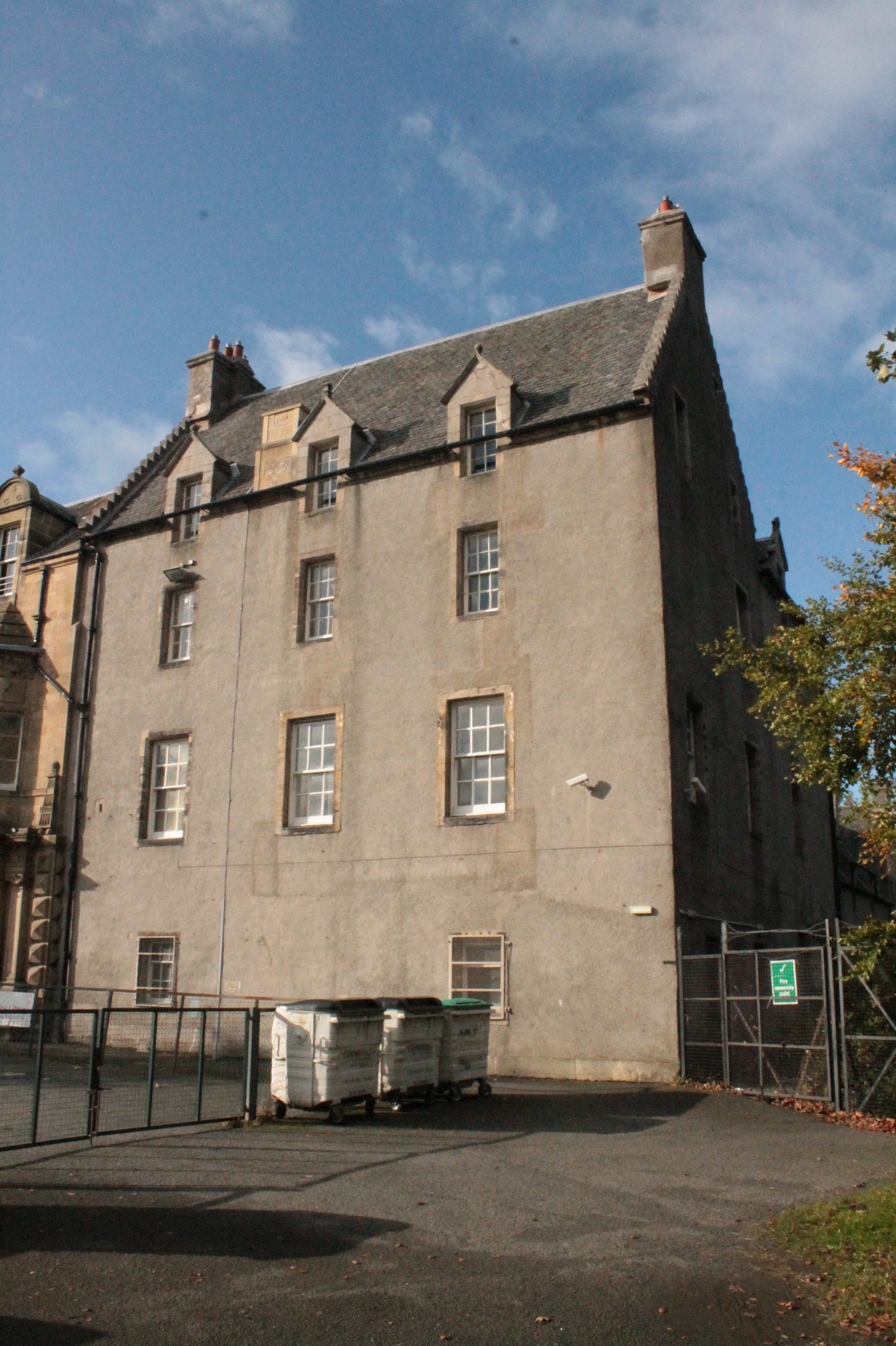
Inch House, Edinburgh (17th century section)

He was born in or near Edinburgh the son of James Winram, Keeper of the Signet (d.1632) and his wife, Jean Swinton (d.1635). In 1607 his father purchased the Nether Liberton estate from the heirs of William Little, which included Liberton House (built 1570) and the medieval Inch House, both south of Edinburgh and set about rebuilding Inch House.

George studied law at Edinburgh University graduating MA and passed the Scottish bar as an advocate in 1626. He inherited Liberton house on the death of his father in 1632.

In 1639 he had the unenviable task of delivering the formal papers from the General Assembly of the Church of Scotland regarding their ban on Episcopalianism in Scotland (which they had voted in 1638). This was certainly unpopular as this was the "religion of choice" of the English living in Scotland due to its Anglican views.

From June 1643 to June 1644 he was assistant commissioner to Archibald Johnston, Lord Warriston (his father-in-law). And from June 1644 until March 1647 he was joint MP for Edinburgh alongside Lord Warriston (during the turbulent English Civil War). He served again from March 1648 until his death.

In June 1649 he was elected a Senator of the College of Justice under the title of Lord Liberton.

In October 1649 he visited the king in exile at Brussels and on the isle of Jersey in November. In February 1650 he arrived at Leith with letters from the king to both the Scottish Parliament and the General Assembly of the Church of Scotland.

In the spring of 1650 he was one of the Scots present at the Treaty of Breda.

He met a tragic end. He fought against Cromwell at the Battle of Dunbar on 3 September 1650, leading a regiment as their Colonel, and was mortally wounded on the battlefield. He died of infection eight days later on 11 September 1650.

His estates were confiscated by the State due to his Royalist support and Liberton House was sold to William Little (grandson of his namesake the Lord Provost of Edinburgh who had previously owned the house). From Little it passed to the Gilmour family (in or before 1686) and remained in their ownership until 1945 when the Edinburgh Corporation acquired the house and estate in lieu of debts.

Both Inch House and Liberton House survive.

== Family ==
Around 1629 he married Agnes Hamilton (d.1636). They had two daughters, Catherine and Ann (d.1690). Following Agnes's death he married Janet Johnston, daughter of Archibald Johnston, Lord Warriston. This was Janet's third marriage, and she brought with her 11 children she had borne to James Skene, Lord Curriehill.
