= Bonnymuir Green Community Trust =

Coordinates: 57.1515°N 2.1313°W

Bonnymuir Green Community Trust is a community-owned green space in Aberdeen, Scotland, running a sustainable community garden and café.

== History ==
Bonnymuir Green Community Trust was established to develop a derelict bowling green in Aberdeen. The Green was originally the walled garden of one of the oldest houses in Midstocket, given to the community in 1924 to start a bowling club, which closed in 2015.

The urban community buyout was completed in September 2018, being the first organisation in the north-east of Scotland to buy private land under community buy-out legislation, introduced by the Scottish Government in 2015. The £120,000 purchase was funded through a Scottish Land Fund grant, monies raised through community support and a charity partnership with local branch of Sainsbury's.

== Today ==
The Green is a community garden open to all. As well as flower and vegetable beds, the garden has a polytunnel growing tomatoes and cucumbers, a wildflower area, children's play area, soft fruit, an orchard and a wildlife pond. The Bonny Café, run by volunteers, provides home baking, soups and bacon rolls, including produce grown in the garden.

The office roof has environmentally friendly EPDM and sedum green roof. Beehives were installed in 2021 and a bug hotel in 2022. Solar PV panels have been installed on the workshop roof.

== Activities ==
The Trust hosts regular social events for the local community, including themed dining nights, festive markets and music. Art exhibitions, workshops and wellbeing classes are held in the former clubhouse or in a marquee in the garden.
