= Scotland's Regeneration Forum =

- Abbreviation: SURF
- Formation: 1992
- Type: Not-for-profit organisation
- Legal status: Charity
- Purpose: Community regeneration
- Headquarters: Glasgow
- Location: Scotland
- Official language: English
- Chief Executive: Euan Leitch
- Website: surf.scot

Scotland's Regeneration Forum (SURF) is the independent regeneration forum for Scotland. It seeks to improve regeneration policy and practice and works closely with policy-makers in the Scottish Government and its agencies. The organisation was established in 1992 and has offices in Glasgow and Edinburgh.

One of SURF's main activities is the annual SURF Awards for Best Practice in Community Regeneration, which has been running since 1998. The SURF Awards are delivered in partnership with the Scottish Government.

SURF also operates a programme called the Alliance for Action, which supports practical regeneration activities in several Scottish places including Govan, Kirkcaldy and Rothesay.
