= Scottish Land Fund =

Fund that helps Scottish communities buy land from their landlords

The Scottish Land Fund (SLF) was founded in 2000, as a part of land reform in Scotland. Its goal is to help communities buy their land from their landlords.

The SLF was capitalized by the UK Lottery-founded New Opportunities Fund. The initial fund was 10,000,000 GBP and this was later increased to 15,000,000 GBP.

By June 2005, the SLF had assisted roughly 200 communities.

== See also ==
- List of community buyouts in Scotland
