= Craigmillar Castle =

Castle in City of Edinburgh, Scotland

- Craigmillar, Edinburgh, Scotland; UK grid reference NT288709
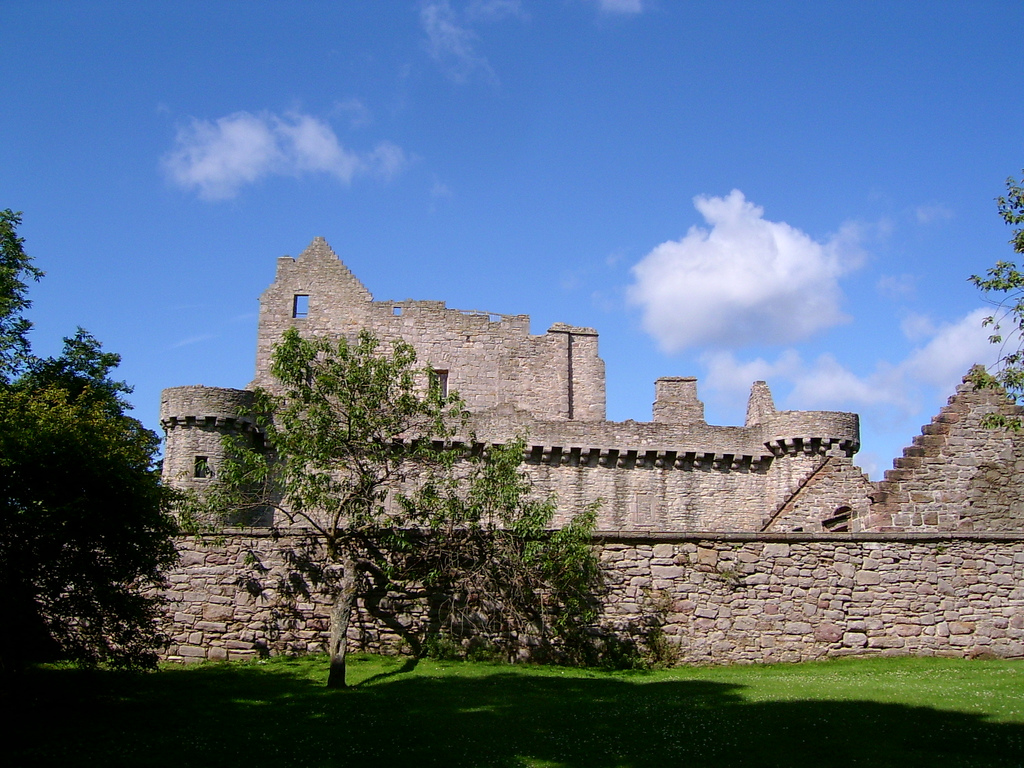
- Craigmillar Castle from the east

Site information
- Type: Courtyard castle
- Owner: Historic Environment Scotland
- Open to the public: Yes
- Condition: Ruined

Location
- Shown within Edinburgh
- Coordinates: 55.9259°N 3.1406°W

Site history
- Built: 14th century
- Built by: Preston family
- In use: Until early 17th century
- Materials: Stone

Designations

Inventory of Gardens and Designed Landscapes in Scotland
- Official name: Craigmillar Castle
- Designated: 30 March 2001
- Reference no.: GDL00115

Craigmillar Castle is a ruined medieval castle in Edinburgh, Scotland. It is three miles (4.8 km) south-east of the city centre, on a low hill to the south of the modern suburb of Craigmillar. The Preston family of Craigmillar, the local feudal barons, began building the castle in the late 14th century and building works continued through the 15th and 16th centuries. In 1660, the castle was sold to Sir John Gilmour, Lord President of the Court of Session, who breathed new life into the ageing castle. The Gilmours left Craigmillar in the 18th century for a more modern residence, nearby Inch House, and the castle fell into ruin. It is now in the care of Historic Environment Scotland as a scheduled monument, and is open to the public.

Craigmillar Castle is best known for its association with Mary, Queen of Scots. Following an illness after the birth of her son, the future James VI, Mary arrived at Craigmillar on 20 November 1566 to convalesce. Before she left on 7 December 1566, a pact known as the "Craigmillar Bond" was made, with or without her knowledge, to dispose of her husband Henry Stuart, Lord Darnley.

Craigmillar is one of the best-preserved medieval castles in Scotland. The central tower house, or keep, is surrounded by a 15th-century courtyard wall with "particularly fine" defensive features. Within this are additional ranges, and the whole is enclosed by an outer courtyard wall containing a chapel and a doocot (dovecote).

== History ==
=== Origins ===
The lands of Craigmillar were granted to the monks of Dunfermline Abbey by King David I in the 12th century. The Preston family were first granted land in the area by King David II in 1342 and held 2/3 of the estate. In a further grant of 1374, King Robert II gave the remaining lands of Craigmillar to Sir Simon de Preston, Sheriff of Midlothian. It was Simon's son, Simon Preston, or his grandson, Sir George Preston, who began work on the tower house which now forms the core of the castle. This was in place by 1425, when a charter was sealed at Craigmillar by Sir John Preston. The courtyard wall was probably added by Sir William Preston (d. 1453), who had travelled in France, and drew on continental inspiration for his new work. He also brought back the arm of Saint Giles, which he presented to the High Kirk of Edinburgh, where the Preston Aisle is named for him. In 1479, John Stewart, Earl of Mar, brother of King James III was held prisoner at Craigmillar, accused of practising witchcraft against the King. He later died in suspicious circumstances.

=== 16th century ===
In 1511 Craigmillar was erected into a barony, and the outer courtyard was built around this time, possibly by another Simon Preston (d.1520), Member of Parliament for Edinburgh in 1487, who had succeeded in 1478. In September 1517, during an outbreak of plague in Edinburgh, the infant James V of Scotland moved to safety at Craigmillar. His French guardian De la Bastie had new locks made for his chamber and the two iron gates, and a stable was built for the king's mule. The family chapel within the outer court was first recorded in 1523. During the so-called Rough Wooing of Henry VIII of England, the English attempted to impose, by military force, a marriage between Edward, Prince of Wales, and the young Mary, Queen of Scots. Craigmillar Castle was burned by English troops under the Earl of Hertford on 8 May 1544, after he had sacked Edinburgh. Sir Simon Preston (d.1569) had the castle repaired, with domestic ranges in the courtyard being remodelled. Preston served as Lord Provost of Edinburgh for several years, and was a loyal supporter of Queen Mary, who appointed him to her Privy Council.

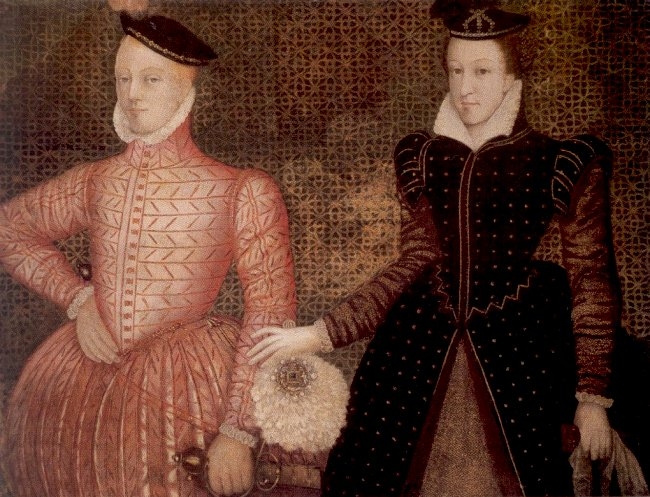
Mary, Queen of Scots, and her husband Lord Darnley, whose murder was arranged at Craigmillar

Queen Mary stayed at Craigmillar twice. In September 1563 she met the English ambassador Thomas Randolph at the castle, with the Earl of Moray and William Maitland. She stayed from 20 November to 7 December 1566, still in poor health following a serious illness in October, and, according to Philibert du Croc, suffering from depression. She gave an audience to a diplomat from Savoy, Jean, Count de Brienne, who had arrived for the baptism of Prince James. Mary is traditionally said to have slept in the small former kitchen within the tower house, although it is more likely that she occupied larger accommodation in the relatively new east range.

Several of her noblemen were with her at Craigmillar in November 1566, and suggested to her that her unpopular husband, Henry Stuart, Lord Darnley, could be removed, either by divorce or by other means. An agreement, the "Craigmillar Bond", was signed by Mary's Secretary of State William Maitland of Lethington, and several nobles including the earls of Bothwell, Argyll and Huntly. The earls met in Argyll's bedchamber in the castle, and then continued the discussion in Bothwell's room. Then they discussed the idea of a divorce with Mary in her chamber. The bond does not survive, but set out the conspirator's intent to remove Darnley. Although Mary made it clear that she was unhappy with Darnley, she was not part of the conspiracy, and was probably unaware of the plot to kill her husband. It was initially intended that Darnley would lodge at Craigmillar when he returned to Edinburgh, although he opted to stay at Kirk o' Field in the town, where he was murdered on 10 February 1567.

During the Marian Civil War, Captain Melville and two of his soldiers, who fought for Mary's cause, were killed in the grounds of the castle on 2 June 1571 when a barrel of gunpowder exploded. In 1572, Regent Mar used Craigmillar as a base while besieging Edinburgh Castle, which was held by supporters of the exiled Queen. Stable were built for a company of light horsemen.

King James VI visited Craigmillar himself when he was the guest of Sir David Preston. In September 1589 James had been at Seton Palace expecting the arrival of Anne of Denmark, and came to Craigmillar still waiting for news of his bride, "as a kind lover spends the time in sighing". It was at Craigmillar that he decided to sail to Norway to meet his Queen, delayed by contrary winds. In 1591, Agnes Sampson was accused of placing a charmed wax image in a dovecote at Craigmillar to help her friend Barbara Napier.

Craigmillar Castle continued to be connected with witchcraft into the seventeenth century. Mr John Preston of Haltree was commissioner during several witchcraft trials between 1661-1662.

=== The Gilmours ===
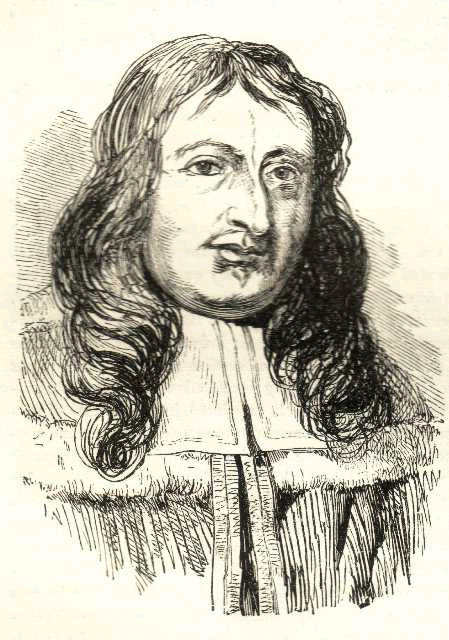
Sir John Gilmour bought Craigmillar in 1660

On the death of Sir Robert Preston in 1639, Craigmillar passed to a distant cousin, David Preston of Whitehill. His son sold the castle out of the family, and it was bought by Sir John Gilmour (d.1671) in 1660, who purchased the neighbouring estate of The Inch at the same time. A Royalist, Gilmour was rewarded following the Restoration of King Charles II, becoming Lord President of the Court of Session in 1661. He remodelled the west range to provide more modern accommodation in the 1660s, but in the early 18th century, the Gilmours left the castle for Inch House, just west of Craigmillar. It was claimed that two of the laird's daughters continued to live in Craigmillar Castle after the rest of the family had left. Afterwards, Craigmillar Castle formed a romantic feature in the park of the Inch estate. It was ruined by 1775, when the antiquarian and poet John Pinkerton wrote Craigmillar Castle: an Elegy. The castle became a popular tourist attraction from the late 18th century, and was drawn by numerous artists. A proposal to renovate the building for the use of Queen Victoria was put forward in 1842, but came to nothing. Victoria herself visited the castle in 1886, and much restoration work was undertaken by its then owner, Walter James Little Gilmour (d.1887).

Craigmillar Castle has been in state care since 1946, and is now maintained by Historic Environment Scotland. The castle is a Scheduled Ancient Monument and the grounds of the castle are included on the Inventory of Gardens and Designed Landscapes, the national register of historic gardens.

== Description ==
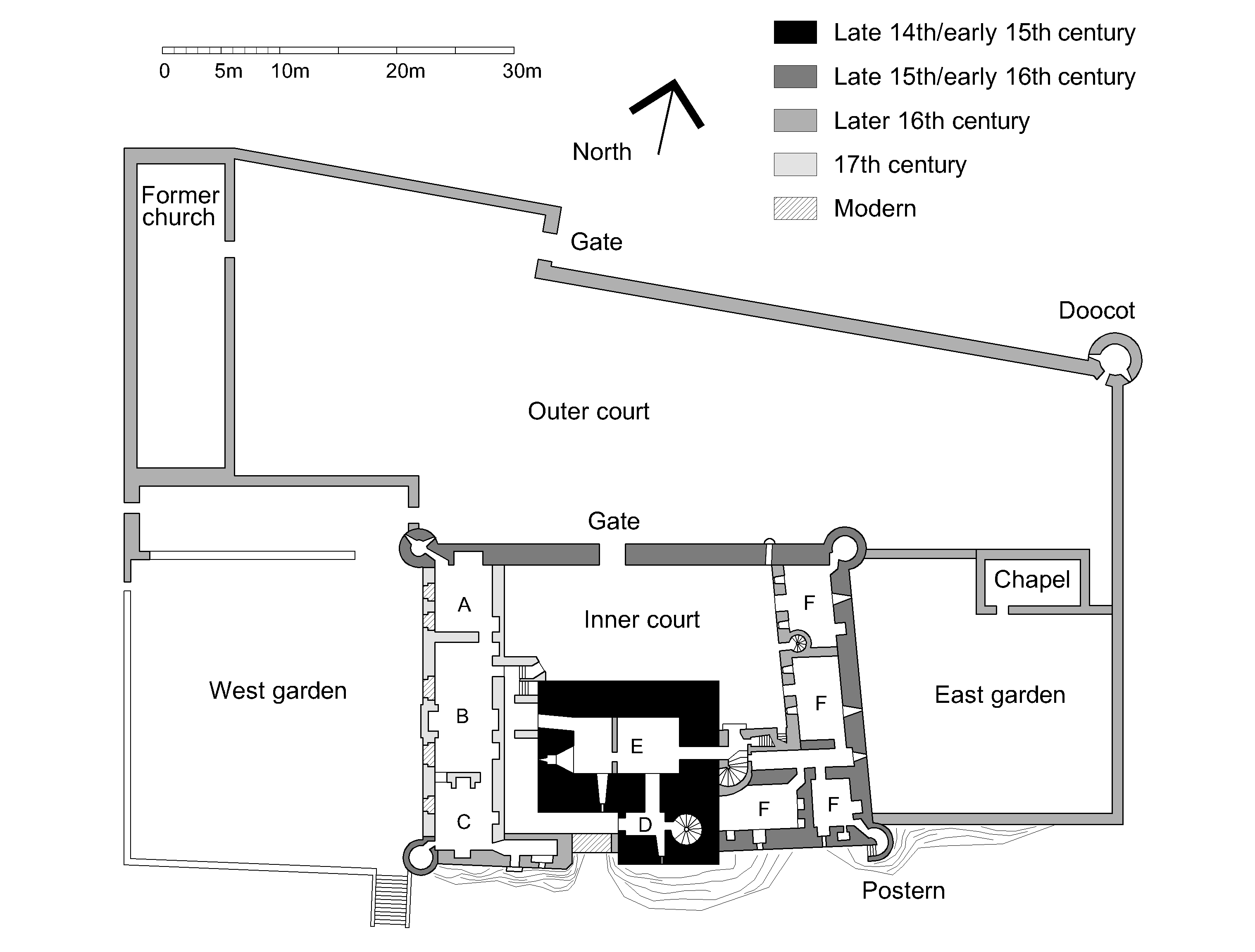
Ground floor plan of Craigmillar Castle. Key: A=Kitchen, B=Dining Room, C=Chamber, D=Tower entrance, E=Tower cellars, F=East range cellars

At the core of Craigmillar Castle is the 14th-century L-plan tower house, built on a rocky outcrop. Wrapped around this is the 15th-century courtyard wall, with ranges of buildings at the south-east, east, and west. Beyond the wall is a lower outer wall, enclosing a broad outer courtyard. This contained gardens and a chapel. Further gardens lay to the south, where the outline of a fish pond can be seen.

=== The tower house ===
Panoramic video from the top of Craigmillar Castle, taken in February 2024

The four-storey tower forms the keep of the castle, although it originally stood alone. It measures 15.8 metres (52 ft) by 11.6 metres (38 ft), with a projecting wing, or jamb, of 8.5 metres (28 ft) by 3.5 metres (11 ft), to the south. The walls are up to 3.3 metres (11 ft) thick, and the second and fourth storeys have vaulted ceilings. The tower is built on the edge of a rock outcrop, with the original entrance door protected by a natural cleft in the rock. This would have been spanned by a wooden bridge, until it was filled in when the curtain wall was built. Above the door are the arms of the Preston family. A stair leads up from the entrance to a guard room in the jamb, which would probably have had "murder holes" through which missiles could be dropped on any attackers who gained entry. At ground floor level are cellars, which formerly had a timber loft above. The dividing wall and doors at either end are later additions.

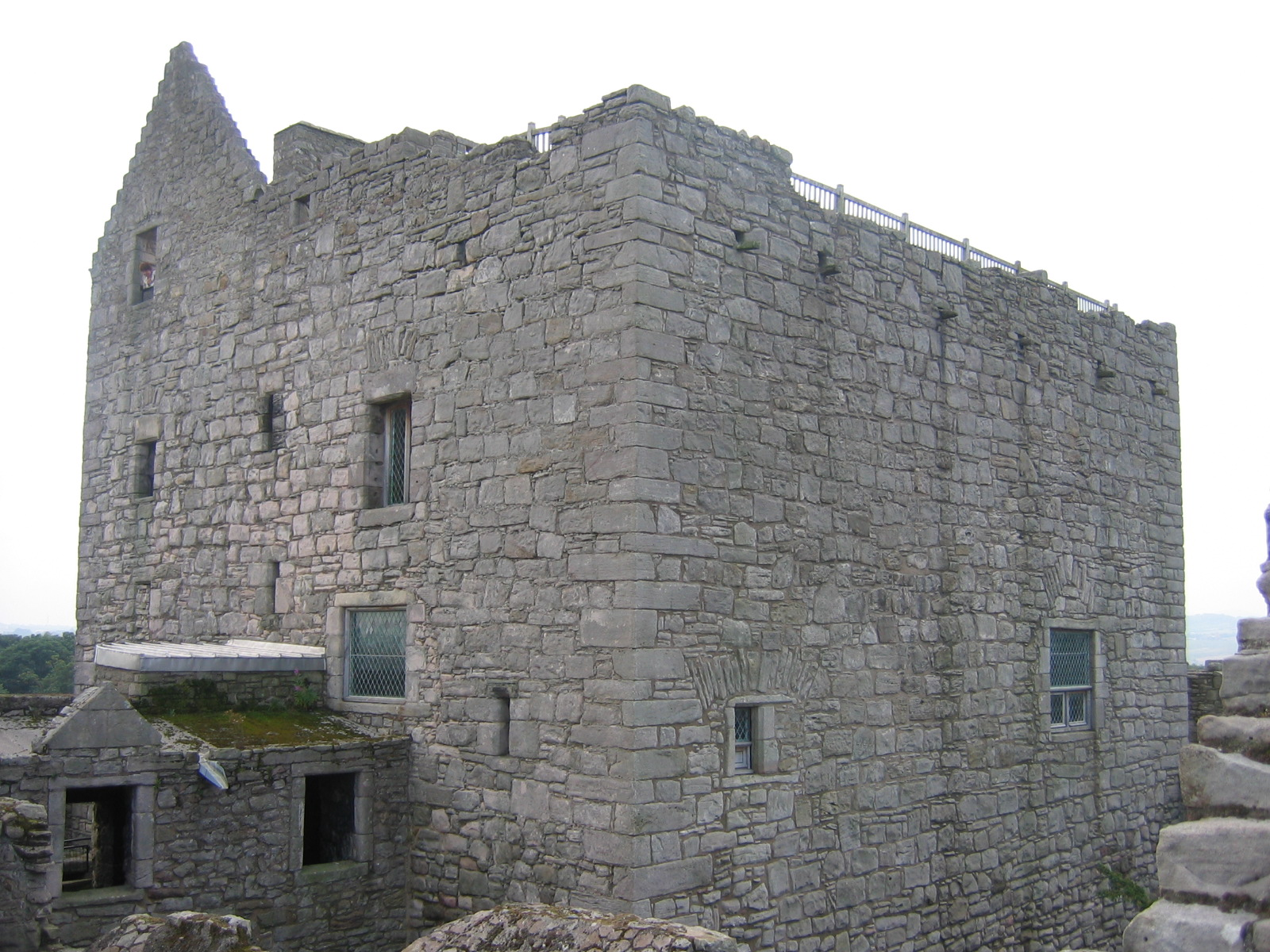
Upper part of the tower house

On the second floor is the hall, with a kitchen occupying the jamb, and later passages connecting to the east and west ranges. The hall has a large carved stone fireplace of around 1500, and once had a timber ceiling, probably painted. The kitchen was replaced by a larger one in the 16th-century east range, and converted into a bedroom. A smaller fireplace was inserted into the large kitchen hearth, and larger windows added. The next storey, accessed via a spiral stair, contained a windowless room in the vault above the hall ceiling. Above the kitchen is the lord's bedroom, the only original private chamber in the building. The stairs continue to give access to the parapet walks around the stone-flagged roof. A further storey was added to the jamb in the sixteenth century, containing a single chamber. The exterior of the castle formerly had two timber balconies, or viewing platforms, one overlooking the gardens to the south, and one looking east across the Lothian countryside.

=== The inner courtyard ===
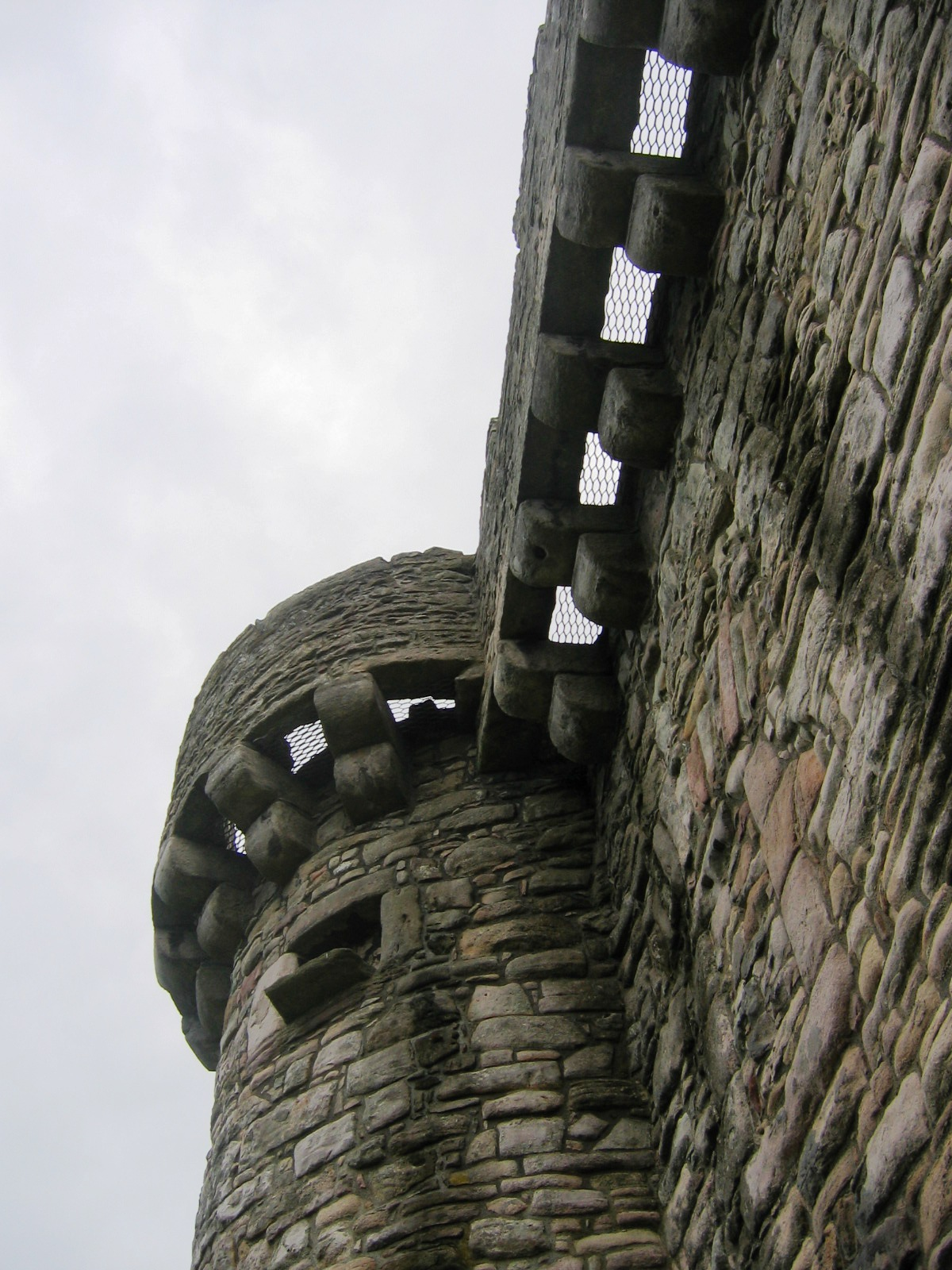
Looking up through the machicolations in the curtain wall

The mid-15th-century curtain wall encloses a courtyard around 10 metres (33 ft) across, and is up to 1.8 metres (5.9 ft) thick. Externally, the curtain wall measures 40 metres (130 ft) by 27 metres (89 ft). Round towers are located at each corner, with a postern, or side gate, located at the base of the south-east tower. The towers have keyhole-shaped gun holes, intended for decoration as well as defence. The round-arched gate is in the north wall. Over it are the arms of the Preston family, with the royal arms of Scotland above. The walls are defended by machicolations, spaces through which missiles could be dropped on attackers, and battlement walks give access to the entire length of the wall. On the inside of the wall, traces of windows suggest that there was once a south range of buildings in the courtyard. There is no well in the courtyard, but a stone trough runs through the curtain wall, allowing water to be brought into the castle.

==== The east range ====
The east range occupies the south-east and east sides of the inner courtyard. The original east range, contemporary with the courtyard wall, was rebuilt in the 16th century and linked to the tower house by a new, broad spiral stair. The building at the south-east adjoins the tower house, and comprises two chambers on the first floor. Cellars below were occupied by a bakehouse and a possible prison. A corridor connects the tower to large, vaulted kitchens in the east range, also accessible via a straight stair from the courtyard. Another depiction of the Preston family arms, supported by monkeys, appears above the door to the east range. Below the kitchens are vaulted cellars, containing a blocked-up postern gate through the courtyard wall. Above, a long gallery occupied the second floor, although only the lower walls of the gallery survive.

==== The west range ====
The west range was entirely rebuilt by the Gilmours, in the 1660s, to provide a spacious suite of modern accommodation, to suit Sir John's position as a senior judge. The roof slates were brought in 1661 from Stobo, carried by horses from Peebles. The ground floor contained a large central drawing room dining room, with large windows, and a carved stone fireplace. This room would also have had plaster ceilings and other decorative features. To the north was a kitchen, and to the south a chamber, with a wine cellar below. The first floor had four bedrooms. Another new stair was built, connecting the west range with the tower house. The door to this tower has a classical pediment, above which is a 20th-century plaque, erected by a descendant of the Gilmours, and bearing the arms of Sir John Gilmour and his wife. The west range is now roofless, the internal floor is also gone, and the large windows have been blocked up.

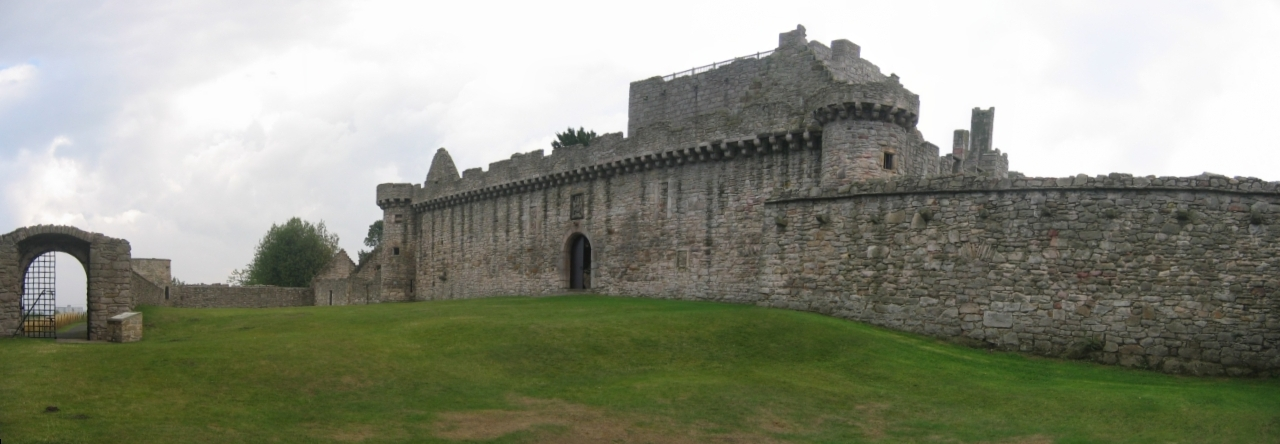
The outer court, with the gate on the left, and the main part of the castle centre-right

=== The outer court and gardens ===
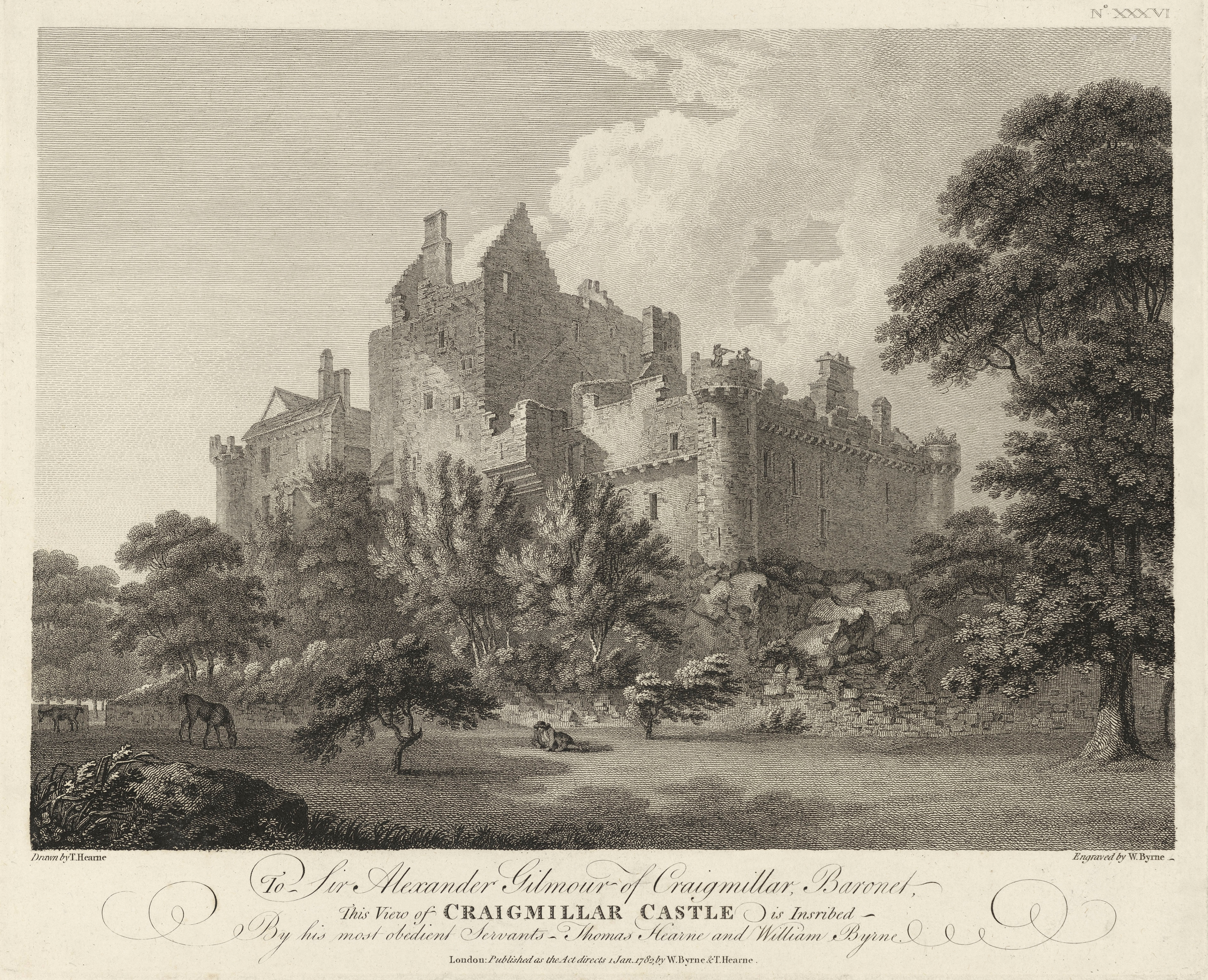
Thomas Hearne and William Byrne's 1782 engraving, dedicated to Sir Alexander Gilmour of Craigmillar Castle.

The outer walls, dating from the early mid-16th century, are smaller and less formidable than the inner walls, but they enclose a much larger area. A round tower at the north-east corner has gun holes and a doocot, or pigeon house, upstairs. The family chapel was built around 1520, and dedicated to St Thomas Becket. It is now a roofless burial aisle, still used by the Gilmour family. Gardens occupied the east and west parts of the courtyard, with the western terrace overlooked by the large windows of the west range. The barn at the north-west of the courtyard was converted into a Presbyterian church, for the village of Liberton, in 1687. South of the castle were informal gardens and orchards, with the bases of 16th-century viewing towers remaining at the corners of this drystone-walled enclosure. The former fish pond, shaped like a letter P for Preston, is a nationally significant archaeological garden feature, due to its rarity. In the 1820s, a plan was drawn up to lay out picturesque landscape gardens between Inch House and the castle, which would have incorporated "Queen Mary's Tree", a Sycamore supposedly planted by Mary, Queen of Scots. Much of the woodland within the castle estate dates from the early to mid 19th century.
