= Gilmour baronets =

Set index for Gilmour baronets

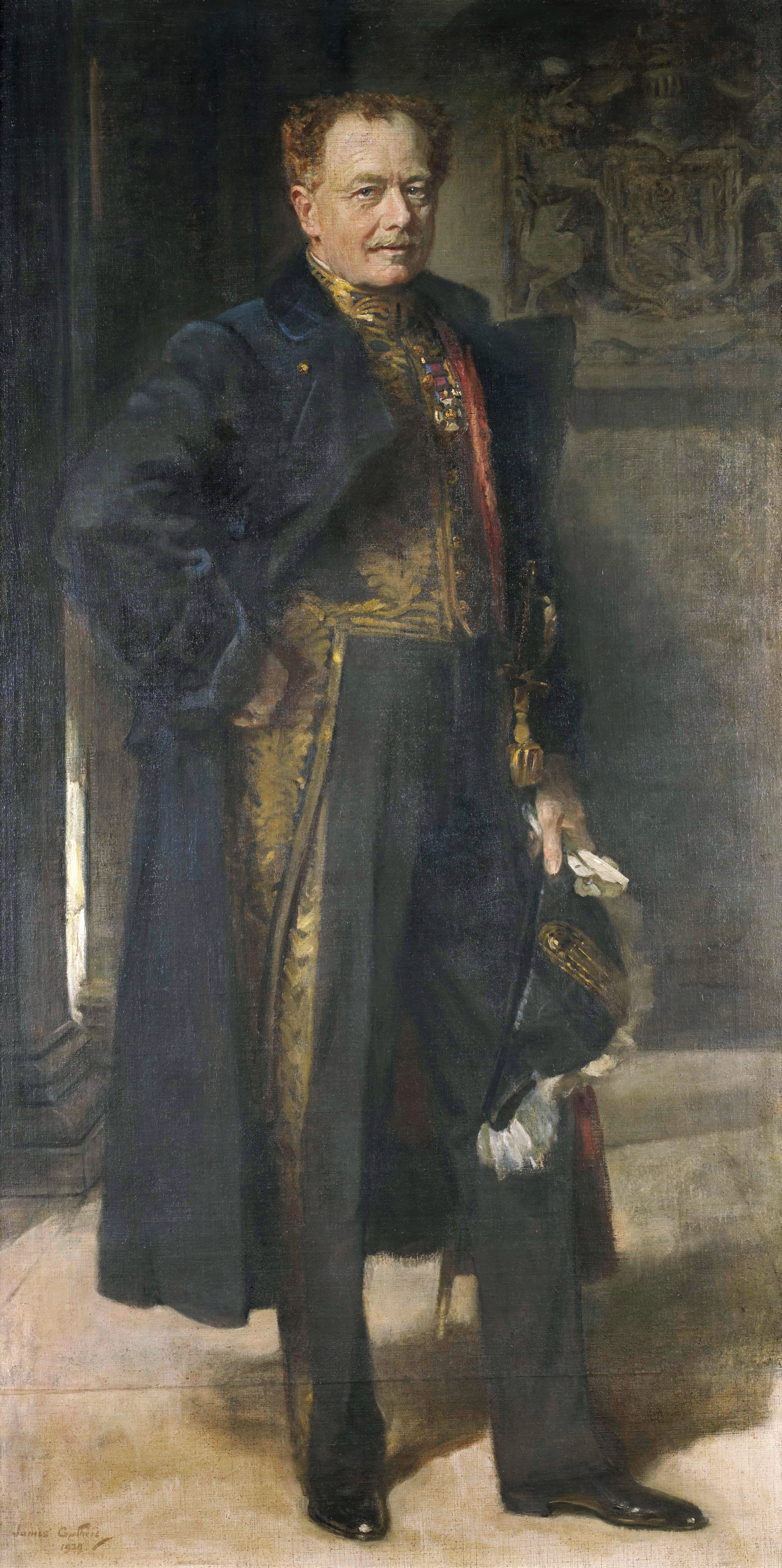
Sir John Gilmour, 2nd Baronet, of Lundin

There have been four baronetcies created for persons with the surname Gilmour, two in the Baronetage of Nova Scotia and two in the Baronetage of the United Kingdom. As of 2026 the former two are extinct and the latter two are extant.

- Gilmour baronets of Edinburgh (1661)
- Gilmour baronets of Craigmillar (1678)
- Gilmour baronets of Lundin and Montrave (1897)
- Gilmour baronets of Liberton and Craigmillar (1926)
