= John Gilmour of Craigmillar =

Scottish judge and politician (1605-1671)

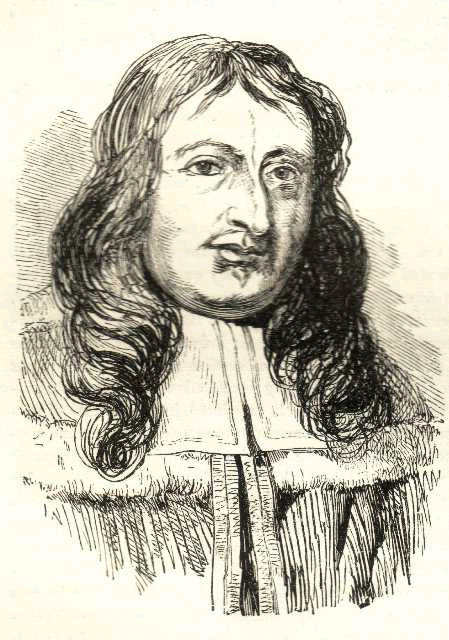
Sir John Gilmour of Craigmillar, Lord President of the Court of Session. Engraving after a painting by John Scougal.

Sir John Gilmour of Craigmillar (1605 – 14 August 1671) was a Scottish judge and politician, who served as Lord President of the Court of Session from 1661 to 1670. He was the son of John Gilmour, Writer to the Signet, and became an advocate on 12 December 1628.

In 1641 he was appointed by Parliament to act for the Royalist Earl of Montrose, who was charged with intrigues against the Marquis of Argyll. Gilmour subsequently became associated with the Royalist party, and following the Restoration of Charles II in 1660, he was appointed Lord President of the Court of Session by the King, on 13 February 1661. The Court of Session, the supreme civil court in Scotland, had not sat for the eleven years of the Interregnum, but resumed in June that year. The same year, Gilmour was appointed a privy counsellor, and was elected to the Parliament of Scotland, representing Edinburgh, and acting as a Lord of the Articles. Although a Royalist, he was a moderate. He sided with Lauderdale, the King's chief minister in Scotland, against the Earl of Middleton, who wished to reintroduce Episcopacy into Scotland. After the failed uprising of the Covenanters at Rullion Green in 1666, he refused to vote for the execution of the captured rebels.

In 1660, Gilmour purchased the adjacent estates of The Inch and Craigmillar, to the south-east of Edinburgh, and renovated part of Craigmillar Castle as his home. He resigned as Lord President on 22 December 1670, and died the following year. His son, Sir Alexander Gilmour of Craigmillar, was created a baronet in 1678.

Legal offices
Vacant Title last held by Sir Robert Spottiswood	Lord President of the Court of Session; 1661–1670	Succeeded by Viscount Stair
