= List of baronetcies in the Baronetage of Nova Scotia =

Peerages and baronetcies of Britain and Ireland
Extant	All
Dukes	Dukedoms
Marquesses	Marquessates
Earls	Earldoms
Viscounts	Viscountcies
Barons	Baronies
Baronets	Baronetcies
En, Ire, NS, GB, UK (extinct)

Coat of arms of Lord Strathspey with the badge of a Baronet of Nova Scotia as heir of the Colquhoun baronetcy of 1625.

This is a list of baronetcies in the Baronetage of Nova Scotia. These were first created in 1624, and were replaced by the Baronetage of Great Britain in 1707.

This page lists baronetcies, whether extant, extinct, dormant (D), unproven (U), under review (R), abeyant, or forfeit, in the Baronetage of Nova Scotia.

The holders of some of the baronetcies listed on the list have died but in each case, up to the present, no person has proved succession and thus been placed upon the Official Roll of the Baronetage. Those that are marked with a "Dormant" in the penultimate column are regarded as being dormant since, although heirs are known to exist, succession has not been proved within a period of five years from the death of the holder.

A baronetcy becomes extinct when heirs cannot be traced and are believed not to exist. In this case it should not be listed on the Official Roll but would be re-activated should an heir subsequently emerge.

The Royal Warrant of Edward VII of 8 February 1910 states "no person whose name is not entered on the Official Roll shall be received as a Baronet, or shall be addressed or mentioned by that title in any civil or military Commission, Letters Patent or other official document".

The list below is not corroborated by The Standing Council of the Baronetage or the Ministry of Justice.

== A ==
Title	Date of creation	Surname	Current status	Notes
Abercromby of Birkenbog	1636	Abercromby	dormant 2003	
Acheson of Glencairny	1628	Acheson	extant	sixth Baronet created Viscount Gosford in 1785; second Viscount created Earl of Gosford in 1806
Agnew of Lochnaw	1629	Agnew	extant	
Alexander of Menstre	1625	Alexander	extinct 1739	first Baronet created Viscount of Stirling in 1630 and Earl of Stirling in 1633
Anstruther of Anstruther	1700	Anstruther	extant	
Anstruther of Balcaskie	1694	Anstruther	extant	
Arnot of Arnot	1629	Arnot	dormant 1838	

== B ==
Title	Date of creation	Surname	Current status	Notes
Baillie of Lochend	1636	Baillie	dormant 1648	
Baird of Newbyth	1660	Baird	extinct 1745	
Baird of Newbyth	1680	Baird	extinct 1745	
Baird of Sauchtonhall	1695	Baird	extant	
Balfour of Denmiln	1633	Balfour	dormant 1793	
Bannerman of Elsick	1682	Bannerman	extant	
Barclay of Pierston	1668	Barclay	extant	
Barr of Glasgow	1628	Barr	extinct 1629	
Bennet of Fife	1671	Bennet	extinct 1700	
Bennet of Grubet	1670	Bennet	extinct 1765	
Bethune of Scotscraig	1683	Sharp	extinct 1997	
Bingham of Castlebar	1634	Bingham	extant	seventh Baronet created Earl of Lucan in 1795
Blackadder of Tulliallan	1626	Blackadder	dormant 1670	
Blair of Kinfauns	18 September 1666	Blair	extinct	Remainder to heirs male of the body of Sir William Blair, 1st Baronet. Having left three daughters and no male issue, the baronetcy extinguished at his death.
Bolles of Osberton	1628	Bolles	dormant 1670	Only creation for a female
Bourke of Mayo	c. 1638	Bourke	extinct 1767	created for the 2nd Viscount Mayo
Bourke of Brittas	c. 1638	Bourke	extinct 1767	first Baronet succeeded as Viscount Mayo in 1649
Broun of Colstoun	1686	Broun	extant	
Brown of Barbados	1664	Brown	extinct 1670	
Browne of The Neale	1636	Browne	dormant 1978	seventh Baronet created Baron Kilmaine in 1789
Bruce of Balcaskie	1668	Bruce	extinct 1711	
Bruce of Stenhouse	1629	Bruce	extant	
Burnett of Leys	1626	Burnett	dormant 1959	

== C ==
Title	Date of creation	Surname	Current status	Notes
Cadell	1628	Cadell	Unknown	
Calder of Muirtone	1686	Calder	dormant 1887	
Campbell of Aberuchil	c.1668	Campbell	extant	
Campbell of Ardkinglass	1679	Campbell	extinct 1752	
Campbell of Ardnamurchan	1628	Campbell	extinct 1651	
Campbell of Auchinbreck	1628	Campbell	extant	
Campbell of Glenorchy	29 May 1625	Campbell	dormant 1995	Second Baronet created Earl of Breadalbane and Holland in 1677
Campbell of Lundy	1627	Campbell	extant	Merged with Duke of Argyll c. 1696; Baronetcy unproven (14th Baronet died 2001) – under review
Carmichael of Bonnington	c.1676	Carmichael	extinct or dormant 1738	
Carmichael of Westraw	1627	Carmichael	dormant 1817	first Baronet created Lord Carmichael in 1647; second Lord created Earl of Hyndford in 1701
Carnegie of Pitarrow	1663	Carnegie	extant	sixth Baronet succeeded as Earl of Southesk in 1855; twelfth Earl succeeded as Duke of Fife in 1959
Cathcart of Carleton	1704	Cathcart	extinct 1916	
Chalmers of Cults	1664	Chalmers	extinct?	
Clerk of Penicuik	1679	Clerk	extant	
Cockburn of Cockburn	1671	Cockburn	extant	
Cockburn of Langton	1627	Cockburn	dormant 1880	
Colquhoun of Colquhoun	1625	Colquhoun, now Grant	extant	Merged with Earl of Seafield 1811 to 1915, now merged with Baron Strathspey
Crawford, later Crawford-Pollock of Kilbirney	1628	Crawford, Crawford-Pollok	dormant 1885	
Crosbie of Queens County	1630	Crosbie	extinct 1936	
Cumming of Culter	1695	Cumming	extinct/dormant c 1793	
Cunningham of Cunninghamhead	1627	Cunningham	extinct 1724	
Cunningham of Auchenharvie	1633	Cunningham	dormant 1659	
Cunningham of London	1642	Cunningham	extinct 1659	
Cunningham of Auchenharvie	1673	Cunningham	extinct 1674	
Montgomery-Cuninghame of Corsehill	1672	Montgomery-Cuninghame	extant	for Sir Alexander Cuningham, 1st Baronet, of Corsehill (d.1685)
Cunynghame of Milncraig	1702	Cunynghame	extant	
Curzon of Kedleston	1636	Curzon	extant	First Baronet also created an English Baronet in 1641. Fifth Baronet created Baron Scarsdale in 1761. Fifth Baron created Baron Curzon of Kedleston in 1898, Earl Curzon of Kedleston in 1911 and Marquess Curzon of Kedleston in 1921, which titles became extinct in 1925, also created Baron Ravensdale in 1911, which title is now separate from the Baronetcies, and Viscount Scarsdale in 1911, which title is still merged with the baronetcies; Baronetcy unproven (11th Baronet died 2000) – under Review

== D ==
Title	Date of creation	Surname	Current status	Notes
Dalmahoy of Dalmahoy	1679	Dalmahoy	extinct 1800	
Dalrymple of Cranstoun	1698	Dalrymple	extant	Created Viscount of Stair in 1690. Now merged with Earl of Stair 1840
Dalrymple of Hailes	1701	Dalrymple	dormant 1829	
Dalrymple of Stair	1664	Dalrymple	extant	Merged with Viscount of Stair 1690, later Earl of Stair
Dalyell of Binns	1685	Dalyell	extant	
Dalzell of Glenae	1666	Dalzell	dormant 1941	Merged with Earl of Carnwath 1702
Davidson of Curriehill	1661	Davidson	extinct 1685	
Denham of Westshield	1694	Denham	extinct 1776	
Dick-Cunyngham of Lambrughton	1669	Cunningham, later Dick-Cunyngham	extinct 1941	Merged with Dick baronets 1829
Dick-Lauder of Fountainhall	1690	Lauder, later Dick-Lauder	extant	
Dick of Prestonfield	1677	Dick	extinct 1728	
Dick of Prestonfield	1707	Dick	extinct 1941	merged with Dick-Cunyngham baronets 1829|
Dickson of Sornbeg	1695	Dickson	extinct/dormant 1760	
Don, later Don-Wauchope of Newton	1667	Don, later Don-Wauchope	extant	
Douglas of Glenbervie	1625	Douglas	dormant 1812	
Douglas of Kelhead	1668	extant	Merged with Marquess of Queensberry 1810	
Dunbar of Durn	1698	Dunbar	extant	
Dunbar of Hempriggs	1706	Dunbar	extant	
Dunbar of Mockrum	1694	Dunbar	extant	
Dunbar of Northfield	1700	Dunbar	extant	

== E ==
Title	Date of creation	Surname	Current status	Notes
Eliott of Stobs	1666	Eliott	extant	
Elliot of Minto	1700	Elliot	extant	Merged with Earl of Minto 1813
Elphinstone of Elphinstone	1628	Elphinstone	dormant 1645	
Elphinstone of Logie	1701	Elphinstone	extant	
Erskine of Alva	1666	Erskine	extant	Merged with Earl of Rosslyn 1805
Erskine of Cambo	1666	Erskine	extant	Merged with Earl of Kellie 1797

== F ==
Title	Date of creation	Surname	Current status	Notes
Fairlie-Cuninghame of Robertland	1630	Cuninghame, later Cuninghame-Fairlie, later Fairlie-Cuninghame	extant	
Falconer of Glenfarquhar	1670	Farquhar	extinct 1727	Merged with Lord Falconer of Halkerton 1724
Fergusson of Kilkerran	1703	Fergusson	extant	
Fleming of Farme	1661	Fleming	extinct/dormant 1764	
Forbes, later Stuart-Forbes of Monymusk	1626	Forbes, Stuart-Forbes	extant	
Forbes of Castle Forbes	1628	Forbes	extant	Merged with Earl of Granard 1684
Forbes of Craigievar	1630	Forbes	extant	Baronetcy unproven (12th Baronet died 2002; under review
Forbes of Foveran	1700	Forbes	dormant 1760	
Forrester of Corstorphine	1625	Forrester	dormant 1654	Merged with Lord Forrester 1633
Fortescue of Salden	1636	Fortescue	dormant 1729	
Foulis, later Liston-Foulis of Colintun	1634	Foulis, Liston-Foulis	extinct 2006	
Foulis, later Primrose of Ravelstoun	1661	Foulis, Primrose	Forfeited 1746	
Fraser of Durris	1673	Fraser	extinct 1729	

== G ==
Title	Date of creation	Surname	Current status	Notes
Gascoigne of Barnbow	1635	Gascoigne	extinct/dormant 1810	
Gibb of Carriber	1634	Gibb	dormant 1650	
Gibson-Craig-Carmichael of Keirhill	1702	Gibson, then Gibson-Carmichael, then Gibson-Craig-Carmichael	extant	
Gilmour of Craigmillar	1678	Gilmour	extinct 1792	
Gilmour of Edinburgh	1661	Gilmour	extinct 1663	
Gordon of Cluny	1625	Gordon	dormant c.1668	
Gordon of Dalpholly	1704	Gordon	dormant 1850	
Gordon of Earlston	1706	Gordon	extant	
Gordon of Embo	1631	Gordon	dormant 1956	Baronetcy dormant (12th Baronet died 1956)
Gordon of Haddo	1642	Gordon	extant	Merged with Earl of Aberdeen 1682
Gordon of Lesmore	1625	Gordon	dormant 1839	
Gordon of Letterfourie	1625	Gordon	dormant 1908	
Gordon of Lochinvar	1626	Gordon	dormant 1847	Merged with Viscount Kenmure 1633
Gordon of Park	1686	Gordon	extinct/dormant 1835	
Graham of Braco	1625	Graham	extant	Dormant 1700. Now assumed by Duke of Montrose
Graham of Gartmore	1665	Graham	extinct 1708	
Grant-Suttie of Balgone	1702	Suttie, later Grant-Suttie	extant	
Grant of Dalvey	1688	Grant	extant	
Grant of Monymusk	1705	Grant	extant	
Gray of Denmiln	1707	Gray	extinct 1773	
Grierson of Lag	1685	Grierson	is dormant, but not extinct in 2008, there is presently no claimant	
Guthrie of Kingsward	1638	Guthrie	unknown	

== H ==
Title	Date of creation	Surname	Current status	Notes
Halkett of Pitfirrane	1697	Halkett	extinct/dormant 1904	
Halkett	1662	Halkett	extinct 1705	
Hall of Dunglass	1687	Hall	extant	
Halyburton of Pitcur	1628	Halyburton	extinct/dormant 1637	
Hamilton-Dalrymple of Bargeny	1697	Dalrymple, later Hamilton-Dalrymple	extant	
Hamilton of Barnton	1692	Hamilton	extinct 1726	
Hamilton of Broomhill	1635	Hamilton	extinct/dormant 1679?	Merged with Lord Belhaven and Stenton 1647
Hamilton of Haggs	1670	Hamilton	extinct 1710	
Hamilton of Killock	1628	Hamilton	dormant 1714	
Hamilton, later Stirling-Hamilton of Preston	1673	Hamilton, Stirling-Hamilton	extant	
Hamilton of Rosehall	1703	Hamilton	dormant 1755	
Hamilton of Silvertonhill	1646	Hamilton	extant	
Hamilton of West Port	1627	Hamilton	extinct/dormant c.1670	
Hannay of Mochrum	1630	Hannay	dormant 1842	
Hay of Alderston	1703	Hay	extant	
Hay of Linplum	1667	Hay	extinct 1751	
Hay of Park	1663	Hay	extant	
Hay of Smithfield	1635	Hay	extinct/dormant 1966	Baronetcy dormant (11th Baronet died 1966)
Henderson of Fordell	1664	Henderson	extinct 1833/dormant	Baronetcy extinct with the death of the 6th Baronet died in 1833). The pretenders of the baronetcy (If they are alive) are the descendants of the younger brother of Sir William Henderson 2nd Baronet, John Henderson (b. About 1660) (but no one seems to have claimed the title after the death of the 6th baronet)
Heron-Maxwell of Springkell	1683	Maxwell, later Heron-Maxwell	extant	
Hill of Waughton	1707	Hill	extinct/dormant 1729	
Holburn of Menstrie	1706	Holburn	extinct/dormant 1874	
Home of Blackadder	1671	Home	extant	
Home of Lumdane	1697	Home	extinct 1783	
Home of Renton	1678	Home	extinct/dormant 1738	
Home of Wedderburn	1638	Home	forfeit 1716	
Home-Purves-Hume-Campbell of Purves Hall	1665	Purves, later Purves-Hume-Campbell, later Home-Purves-Hume-Campbell	dormant 1960	Baronetcy dormant (8th Baronet died 1960)
Hope-Dunbar of Baldoon	1664	Dunbar, later Hope-Dunbar	extant	
Hope of Craighall	1628	Hope	extant	
Hope of Kerse	1672	Hope	extinct c 1794	
Hope of Kirkliston	1698	Hope	dormant 1763	
Houston of Houston	1668	Houston	extant, unclaimed	
Hume of North Berwick	1671	Home	extinct/dormant 1747	
Hume of Polwarth	1637	Hume	dormant 1794	Merged with Earl of Marchmont 1794

== I-J ==
Title	Date of creation	Surname	Current status	Notes
Inglis of Cramond	1687	Inglis	extant	
Innes, later Innes-Ker of Innes	1625	Innes, Innes-Ker	extant	sixth Baronet succeeded as Duke of Roxburghe in 1812
Innes of Balvenie	1628	Innes	extant	
Innes of Coxtoun	1686	Innes	extant	
Jardine of Applegirth	1672	Jardine	extant	
Johnston of Caskieben	1626	Johnston	extant	
Johnston of Elphinston	1628	Johnston	status unknown	
Johnstone of Westerhall	1700	Johnstone	extant	

== K ==
Title	Date of creation	Surname	Current status	Notes
Keith	1625	Keith	forfeited 1716	created for sixth Earl Marischal
Keith of Ludquharn	1629	Keith	dormant 1881	
Keith of Powburn	1663	Keith	extinct or dormant after 1663	
Kennedy of Girvan	1673	Kennedy	extinct 1740	
Kennedy of Culzean	1682	Kennedy	extinct 1792	fourth Baronet succeeded as Earl of Cassilis in 1759
Kennedy of Clowburn	1698	Kennedy	extinct or dormant 1729	
Kerr of Greenland	1637	Kerr	dormant 1776	
Kinloch of Kinloch	1685	Kinloch	forfeited 1746	
Kinloch of Gilmerton	1686	Kinloch	extant	
Kirkaldy of Grange	1664	Kirkaldy	presumably extinct c. 1680	
Kirkpatrick of Closeburn	1625	Kirkpatrick	extant	

== L ==
Title	Date of creation	Surname	Current status	Notes
Lauder of Idlington	1688	Lauder	annulled 1692	see Dick-Lauder baronets
Laurie of Maxwelton	1685	Laurie	extinct 1848	
Leslie of Wardis	1625	Leslie	dormant 1967	Baronetcy dormant c. 1680-c. 1800 and since 1967 (when 9th Baronet died)
Lindsay of Evelick	1666	Lindsay	extinct 1799	
Livingston, later Campbell of Glentirran	1685	Livingston, Campbell	extinct or dormant 1810	
Livingston of Westquarter	1699	Livingston	extinct or dormant 1853	
Livingstone of Dunnipace	1625	Livingstone	dormant c. 1634	
Livingstone of Newbiggin	1627	Livingstone	dormant 1718	
Livingstone of Kinnaird	1627	Livingstone	dormant 1694	second Baronet created Viscount Newburgh in 1647
Lockhart, later Lockhart-Ross of Carstairs	1672	Lockhart, Lockhart-Ross	extinct 1942	
Longueville of Wolverton	1638	Longueville	extinct or dormant 1802	
Lowther of Lowther	c. 1638	Lowther	extinct or dormant 1759	second Baronet created Viscount Lonsdale in 1696; fifth Baronet created Earl of Lonsdale in 1784

== M ==
Title	Date of creation	Surname	Current status	Notes
Macarty of Muskerry	c. 1638	Macarty	forfeit 1691	first Baronet succeeded as Viscount of Muskerry in 1640
Macdonald of Sleat	1625	Macdonald, Bosville-Macdonald	extant	
Mackay of Strathnaver	1627	Mackay	extant	first Baronet created Lord Reay in 1628
Mackenzie of Coul	1673	Mackenzie	dormant 1990	
Mackenzie of Darien	1703	Mackenzie	dormant 1839	
Mackenzie, later Inglis of Gairloch	1703	Mackenzie, Inglis	extant	
Mackenzie of Scatwell	1703	Mackenzie	dormant 1972	
Mackenzie of Tarbart	1628	Mackenzie	forfeited 1763	
Mackenzie of Royston	1704	Mackenzie	forfeited 1763	
Maclean of Morvern	1631	Maclean	extant	
Maclellan of Bombie	c. 1631	Maclellan	dormant 1831	first Baronet created Lord Kirkcudbright in 1633
Maculloch of Myrstoun	1664	Maculloch	extinct 1697	
Maitland of Pitrichies	1672	Maitland	extinct or dormant c. 1704	
Maitland of Ravelrig	1680	Maitland	extant	first Baronet succeeded as Earl of Lauderdale in 1695
Makgill of Cranston Riddell	1627	Makgill	extant	
Malcolm of Balbedie and Innertiel	1665	Malcolm	extant	
Marshall	1658	Marshall	extinct 1816	
Maxwell of Calderwood	1627	Maxwell	extant	Merged with Baron Farnham in 1885; Baronetcy unproven (14th Baronet died 2001) – under review
Maxwell of Pollock	1630	Maxwell	extinct or dormant 1647	
Maxwell of Orchardtoun	1663	Maxwell	dormant 1786	
Maxwell of Monreith	1681	Maxwell	extant	
Maxwell, later Stirling-Maxwell, later Macdonald of Pollock	1682	Maxwell, Stirling-Maxwell, Macdonald	extant	
Menzies of Castle Menzies	1665	Menzies	extinct 1910	
Meredith of Marston	1639	Meredith	dormant 1790	
Milne of Barnton	1686	Milne	extinct or dormant 1791	
Moir of Longford	1636	Moir	extinct or dormant 1644	
Moncreiff of Moncreiff	1626	Moncreiff	extant	Merged with Baron Moncreiff in 1883; Baronetcy unproven (15th Baronet died 2002) – under review
Moncreiffe, later Hay	1685	Moncreiffe, Hay	extant	
Montgomery of Skelmorly	1628	Montgomery	dormant 1735	
Mowat of Inglestoun	1664	Mowat	status unknown	
Munro of Foulis	1634	Munro	extant	Foulis-Obsdale from 1954.
Mure of Rowallen	1662	Mure	presumably extinct c. 1700	
Murray of Cockpool	1625	Murray	dormant 1658	second Baronet succeeded as Viscount Annand
Murray of Clermont	1626	Murray	dormant c. 1700	
Murray of Blackbarony	1628	Murray	extant	
Murray, later Erskine-Murray of Elibank	1628	Murray, Erskine-Murray	extant	first Baronet created Lord Elibank in 1643
Murray of Dunerne	1630	Murray	dormant 1958	Baronetcy dormant (13th Baronet died 1958)
Murray of Stanhope	1664	Murray	forfeited 1746	
Murray of Ochtertyre	1673	Murray	extant	
Murray, later Hepburn-Murray of Glendoick	1676	Murray, Hepburn-Murray	extinct c. 1774	
Murray of Melgund	1704	Murray	dormant 1848	

== N ==
Title	Date of creation	Surname	Current status	Notes
Naesmyth of Possos	1706	Naesmyth	extinct 1928	
Nairne of Dunsinnan	1704	Nairne	dormant 1811	
Napier of Merchistoun	1627	Napier	extant	First Baronet created Lord Napier in 1627; the titles separated in 1683 when the baronetcy became dormant. It was successfully claimed in 1817
Newton of Newton	1697	Newton	extinct by 1727	
Nicolson of Cocksburnpeth	1625	Nicolson	status unknown	
Nicolson of Lasswade	1629	Nicolson	extant	held by the Baron Carnock since 1984
Nicolson of Carnock	1637	Nicolson	extant	held by the Lord Napier from 1683 to 1686; eleventh Baronet created Baron Carnock in 1916
Nicolson of Glenbervie	1700	Nicolson	dormant c. 1839	
Patrick Nisbet, Lord Eastbank aka Nisbet of Dean	1669	Nisbet	extinct 1827	
Norton of Cheston	1635	Norton	extinct c. 1673	

== O ==
Title	Date of creation	Surname	Current status	Notes
Ogilvie of Carnoustie	1626	Ogilvie	dormant 1861	
Ogilvie of Barras	1662	Ogilvie	dormant 1861	
Ogilvy of Inverquharity	1626	Ogilvy	extant	
Ogilvy of Forglen	1627	Ogilvy	dormant 1803	first Baronet created Lord Banff in 1642
Oliphant of Newton	1628	Oliphant	dormant c. 1691	

== P ==
Title	Date of creation	Surname	Current status	Notes
Paterson of Bannockburn	1686	Paterson	forfeited 1716	
Paterson of Eccles	1687	Paterson	dormant 1782	
Pickering of Titchmarsh	1638	Pickering	extinct 1749	
Piers of Stonepit	1638	Piers	dormant 1720	
Pilkington, later Milborne-Swinnerton-Pilkington of Stanley	1635	Pilkington, Milborne-Swinnerton-Pilkington	extant	
Pollock of Pollock	1703	Pollock	extinct 1783	
Preston of Airdrie	1628	Preston	dormant c. 1792	
Preston of Valleyfield	1637	Preston	dormant 1873	
Pretyman of Lodington	c. 1660	Pretyman	dormant c. 1749	
Primrose of Carrington	1651	Primrose	extant	Earl of Rosebery
Pringle of Stichell	1683	Pringle	extant	

== R ==
Title	Date of creation	Surname	Current status	Notes
Ramsay of Balmain	1625	Ramsay	dormant	
Ramsay of Whitehill	1665	Ramsay	extinct	
Ramsay of Banff House	1666	Ramsay	extinct	
Ramsay of Abbotshall	1669	Ramsay	extinct	
Rayney of Wrotham	1635	Rayney	dormant 1721	
Rayney of Wrotham	1642	Rayney	dormant 1721	
Reid of Barra	1703	Reid	extinct 1885	
Richardson, later Stewart-Richardson of Pencaitland	1630	Richardson, Stewart-Richardson	extant	
Riddell of Riddell	1628	Riddell	extant	
Ruthven of Redcastle	1666	Ruthven	extinct c. 1700	

== S ==
Title	Date of creation	Surname	Current status	Notes
St Etienne of France	1629	St Etienne	presumed extinct c. 1660	
Scott of Thirlestane	1666	Scott, Napier	extant	Held by the Lord Napier since 1725
Scott of Ancrum	1671	Scott	extinct 1902	
Seton of Abercorn	1663	Seton	extant	
Seton of Carleton	1664	Seton	forfeited c. 1720	
Seton of Windygowl	1671	Seton	extinct 1671	
Seton of Pitmeddan	1683	Seton	dormant 1993	Baronetcy dormant (11th Baronet died 1993)
Sharp, later Bethune of Scotscraig	1683	Sharp, Bethune	extant	
Shaw of Greenock	1687	Shaw	extinct 1752	
Sibbald of Rankelour	1630	Sibbald	dormant c. 1680	
Sinclair of Dunbeath	1631	Sinclair	extinct c. 1652	
Sinclair of Canisbay	1631	Sinclair	extant	seventh Baronet succeeded as Earl of Caithness in 1789
Sinclair, later Sinclair-Lockhart of Stevenston	1636	Sinclair, Sinclair-Lockhart	extant	
Sinclair of Longformacus	1664	Sinclair	extinct or dormant c. 1843	
Sinclair of Kinnaird	c. 1675	Sinclair	status unknown	
Sinclair of Dunbeath	1704	Sinclair	extant	
Skene of Curriehill	1628	Skene	extinct or dormant c. 1680	
Slingsby of Scriven	1638	Slingsby	dormant 1869	
Stewart, later Drummond-Stewart of Blair and Balcaskie	1683	Stewart, Drummond-Stewart	extinct 1890	
Stewart of Corsewell	1627	Stewart	extant	first Baronet succeeded as Earl of Galloway in 1649
Slingsby of Traquair	c. 1628	Stewart	dormant 1861	first Baronet created Earl of Traquair in 1633
Stewart of Ochiltree	1630	Stewart	patent cancelled 1632	
Stewart, later Shaw-Stewart of Blackhall and Greenock	1667	Stewart, Shaw-Stewart	extant	
Stewart of Castlemilk	1668	Stewart	extinct 1797	
Stewart	1681	Stewart	extinct 1735	first Baronet succeeded as Earl of Moray in 1701
Stewart of Allanbank	1681	Stewart	extinct 1849	
Stewart of Burray	1687	Stewart	dormant 1746	now merged into earldom of Galloway
Stewart, later Steuart-Denham of Goodtrees	1705	Stewart, Steuart-Denham	extinct 1851	second Baronet succeeded in the Steuart Baronetcy of Coltness in 1773
Stewart of Tillicoultry	1707	Stewart	dormant 1767	
Steuart, later Steuart-Denham, later Steuart-Barclay of Glorat	1666	Steuart, Steuart-Denham, Steuart-Barclay	extinct or dormant 1851	
Stirling of Glorat	1666	Stirling	dormant 1949	
Stirling of Ardoch	1666	Stirling	extinct 1808	
Strachan of Thornton, later of Inchtuthill	1625	Strachan	dormant 1854	
Stuart of Castle Stewart	1628	Stuart	extant	first Baronet created Baron Castle Stewart in 1629, ninth Baronet created Earl Castle Stewart in 1800
Stuart, later Crichton-Stuart of Bute	1627	Crichton-Stuart	extant	third Baronet created Earl of Bute in 1703

== T ==
Title	Date of creation	Surname	Current status	Notes
Temple	1662	Temple	extinct 1674	
Thomson of Duddingston	1636	Thomson	dormant c. 1691	
Threipland of Fingask	1687	Threipland	extinct or dormant 1882	
Turing of Foveran	c. 1638	Turing	extant	

== V-W ==
Title	Date of creation	Surname	Current status	Notes
Vernatti of Carleton	1634	Vernatti	presumed dormant some time after 1678	
Wallace of Craigie Wallace	c. 1638	Wallace	resigned 1659	
Wallace of Craigie	1670	Wallace	extinct 1770	
Wardlaw of Pitreavie	1631	Wardlaw	dormant 1983	
Wedderburn of Balindean	1704	Wedderburn	forfeit 1746	David Wedderburn, 7th Baronet but for the attainder, was created a Baronet in 1803 (see Ogilvy-Wedderburn baronets
Weir of Blackwood	1694	Weir	extinct 1735	
Wemyss of Wemyss	1625	Wemyss	dormant 1679	first Baronet created Lord Wemyss 1628
Wemyss of Bogie	1704	Wemyss	dormant c. 1770	
Whitefoord of Blairquhan	1701	Whitefoord	dormant 1803	
Widdrington of Widdrington	1635	Widdrington	extinct 1671	
Wishart, later Belshes, later Wishart-Belshes of Clifton Hall	1706	Wishart, Belshes, Wishart-Belshes	dormant 1821	
Wood of Bonnytown	1666	Wood	extinct 1738	

== See also ==
- List of extant Baronetcies
- List of baronetcies in the Baronetage of Ireland
- List of baronetcies in the Baronetage of England
- List of baronetcies in the Baronetage of the United Kingdom
- List of baronetcies in the Baronetage of Great Britain
