= Cunningham baronets =

Set index for Cunningham baronets

There have been six Cunningham baronetcies.

- Cunningham baronets of Cunninghamhead (1627)
- Cunningham baronets of Robertland (1630): see Fairlie-Cuninghame baronets
- Cunningham baronets of Auchinhervie (1st creation, 1633): see David Cunningham of Auchenharvie
- Cunningham baronets of Auchinhervie (2nd creation, 1673)
- Cunningham baronets of Hyndhope (1942): see Andrew Cunningham, 1st Viscount Cunningham of Hyndhope
- Cunningham baronets of Crookedstone (1963): see Knox Cunningham

== See also ==
- Cunynghame baronets of Milncraig
- Montgomery-Cuninghame baronets
- Dick-Cunyngham baronets
