= Anne Dick =

Scottish poet and eccentric, died 1741

Lady Anne Dick or Anne Cunyngham or Anne Mackenzie (died 1741) was a Scottish noblewoman, poet and eccentric. Some of her lampoons and verses are said to have embarrassed her friends.

== Background ==
Anne Mackenzie's grandfather was George Mackenzie, 1st Earl of Cromartie and her father was a Scottish judge, Lord Royston. One of the earliest things known about her is that she married William Cunyngham, who came to notice when his mother's grandfather died in 1728. This brought wealth, and he and his wife took the surname Dick, as Sir William Dick and Anne, Lady Dick.

The baronetcy had been created for Sir John Dick Bt (1719–1804) as the British Consul at Leghorn.

== Consternation ==
Lady Anne and her maidservant caused consternation by appearing in public in Edinburgh dressed as boys. Her peers and friends were also said to have been embarrassed when she published lampoons and verses of a "coarse" nature, for which she was censured in the Dictionary of National Biography. Three such appeared in a Book of Ballads (41-43) in 1823 and others in 1824.

== Death ==
Dick died childless in 1741 and her husband in 1746. The title passed to her brother-in-law, the physician Sir Alexander Dick, who moved into the family seat of Prestonfield House in Edinburgh.
