= Dick baronets of Braid (putative) =

The Dick baronetcy of Braid is a supposed title in the Baronetage of Nova Scotia, said to have been created in 1641 for Sir William Dick of Braid (c.1590–1655) who was Provost of Edinburgh from 1638 to 1640. On 14 March 1768, John Dick, the British consul in Leghorn, was recognised in an Edinburgh court as holder of the baronetcy. Even so, it has been doubted whether the title was in fact created. Cokayne states that Dick was knighted, and that the supposition that he was made a baronet is "apparently in error".

== Background ==
Sir William's fourth son, Alexander Dick of Heugh, was the father of the 1st Dick baronet of Prestonfield, while his fifth son, Louis, was John Dick's great-grandfather. John Dick's cause was championed by James Boswell, who had met him in Italy. After the consul died in 1805 without issue, a memorial that his claim had been invalid was issued by Charles Dick, male heir of Sir William's eldest son, another John Dick. Charles' son William was legally recognised as Sir William's male heir in 1821 and began styling himself baronet. The baronetcy was never proved in law; it was recognised by Walford's County Families, Douglas' Baronage, and Dod's and Debrett's Peerages, but not Burke's. In 1873, The Herald and Genealogist found no contemporary evidence that Sir William Dick of Braid had received a baronetcy. Chamberlayne's Present State of Great Britain, upon which John Dick's 1768 claim was founded, described the baronetcy as extinct.
