= George Pretyman Tomline =

English clergyman and theologian (1750–1827)

The Right Reverend Sir George Pretyman Tomline Bt FRS
- Bishop of Winchester
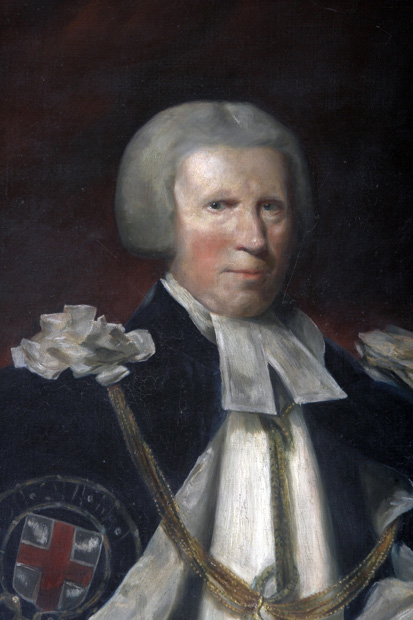
- Pretyman Tomline robed as Garter Prelate.
- Diocese: Diocese of Winchester
- In office: 1820–1827
- Predecessor: Brownlow North
- Successor: Charles Sumner
- Other posts: Private secretary to the Prime Minister (1783–1787); Dean of St Paul's (1787–1820); Bishop of Lincoln (1787–1820)

Orders
- Ordination: 1774 (deacon); 1776 (priest)
- Consecration: c. 1787

Personal details
- Born: George Pretyman; 9 October 1750 Bury St Edmunds, Suffolk, Great Britain
- Died: 14 November 1827 (aged 77) Wimborne, Dorset, United Kingdom
- Buried: Winchester Cathedral
- Denomination: Anglican
- Residence: Kingston Hall, near Wimborne (at death)
- Parents: George Pretyman and Susan Hubbard
- Spouse: Elizabeth Maltby (m. 1784-1826; her death)
- Children: 3
- Profession: theologian
- Education: Pembroke College, Cambridge

In this name, the family name is Pretyman (before 1803), Pretyman Tomline (from 1803), but commonly called Tomline thereafter.

Sir George Pretyman Tomline, 5th Baronet FRS (born George Pretyman; 9 October 1750 – 14 November 1827) was an English clergyman, theologian, Bishop of Lincoln and then Bishop of Winchester, and confidant of William Pitt the Younger. He was an opponent of Catholic emancipation.

== Early life ==
He was born George Pretyman in Bury St Edmunds, Suffolk to a family claiming to have been influential in the region as far back as the fourteenth century. His father, also George Pretyman (1722–1810) was a landowner and wool merchant. His mother, George's wife, was Susan, née Hubbard (1720/1721–1807).

Pretyman attended Bury St Edmunds Grammar School and then Pembroke College, Cambridge, graduating in 1772 as senior wrangler and Smith's prizewinner. He was elected a fellow of Pembroke in 1773. He was ordained deacon in 1774 and priest in 1776: by Philip Yonge, Bishop of Norwich at his Palace's chapel on 14 August 1774, and by John Hinchliffe, Bishop of Peterborough at Trinity College, Cambridge on 16 June 1776.

William Pitt the Younger was sent to Pembroke in 1773, at the age of fourteen, and Pretyman became his tutor and gradually his friend and confidant. Pitt did not have the best of health in University and Pretyman looked after him, accompanying him often so that the young man could get fresh air and improve his health. When Pitt unsuccessfully stood for election as Member of Parliament for Cambridge University in the 1780 British general election, Pretyman supported him.

Pitt became Prime Minister of Great Britain in December 1783 when the Fox-North Coalition fell but it remained for him to win the 1784 British general election. On his 1784 victory, Pitt made Pretyman his private secretary, though the title was thought inappropriate for a clergyman. Pretyman's mathematical ability was soon called upon in advising Pitt on the sinking fund and other technicalities of fiscal policy.

On 3 September 1784, Pretyman married Elizabeth Maltby (died 13 June 1826), cousin of Edward Maltby, the future Bishop of Chichester and himself eighth wrangler, and appointed Edward his domestic chaplain. George and Elizabeth were well-matched and he constantly consulted her on church and political issues. On 17 March 1785 Tomline was elected a Fellow of the Royal Society.

== Bishop of Lincoln ==
In 1787, Pitt appointed Pretyman Bishop of Lincoln, having to overcome the opposition of George III who objected to Pretyman's youth. Having already become Dean of St Paul's (he was instituted to the Portpoole prebend by Robert Lowth, Bishop of London on 21 February 1787), his election was confirmed by John Moore, Archbishop of Canterbury, at St Mary-le-Bow on 10 March 1787 and he was consecrated a bishop by Moore (assisted by William Ashburnham, Bishop of Chichester; Shute Barrington, Bishop of Salisbury and Beilby Porteus, Bishop of Chester) at Lambeth Palace chapel on 11 March 1787.

Pretyman remaintained on close terms with Pitt, though Lincoln's duties kept him from frequent visits to London, and shared Whig attitudes. In a sermon to the House of Lords on 30 January 1789, Pretyman condemned Charles I, who was executed by parliament in 1649, and praised his political opponents. Pretyman was a traditional Anglican and initially had little time and sympathy for the evangelical group in the Church of England called Methodists. This view gradually softened as Pretyman got to know William Wilberforce. John Wesley wrote to Pretyman in 1790 accusing him of troubling the 'people called Methodists' . Pretyman continued to advise Pitt on finance and on Pitt's Ecclesiastical Plan. Pretyman was an opponent of Catholic emancipation and was against Pitt's 1801 decision to resign when he failed to effect the changes promised to the Irish Catholics in the compromises made over the passage of the Act of Union 1800.

Henry Addington's regime was still less to Pretyman's taste and his anti-Catholic sentiments strengthened. However, he remained on good terms with Pitt and was ready to help him out of his debts.

== Pitt's second ministry ==
Already wealthy, in 1803 he inherited extensive property from the unrelated, Marmaduke Tomline, and took the name Tomline. Pitt returned to government in 1804 and, much to Tomline's satisfaction, promoted Tomline as Archbishop of Canterbury, even though there was an earlier provisional agreement with the King that Charles Manners-Sutton should be appointed. However, the King was not to be manœuvred and exercised his royal prerogative to appoint Manners-Sutton.

Tomline was offered the post of Bishop of London in 1813 but declined because he thought the duties too onerous. He was translated to Bishop of Winchester by the confirmation of his election (by Manners-Sutton) on 15 August 1820.

== Family and death ==
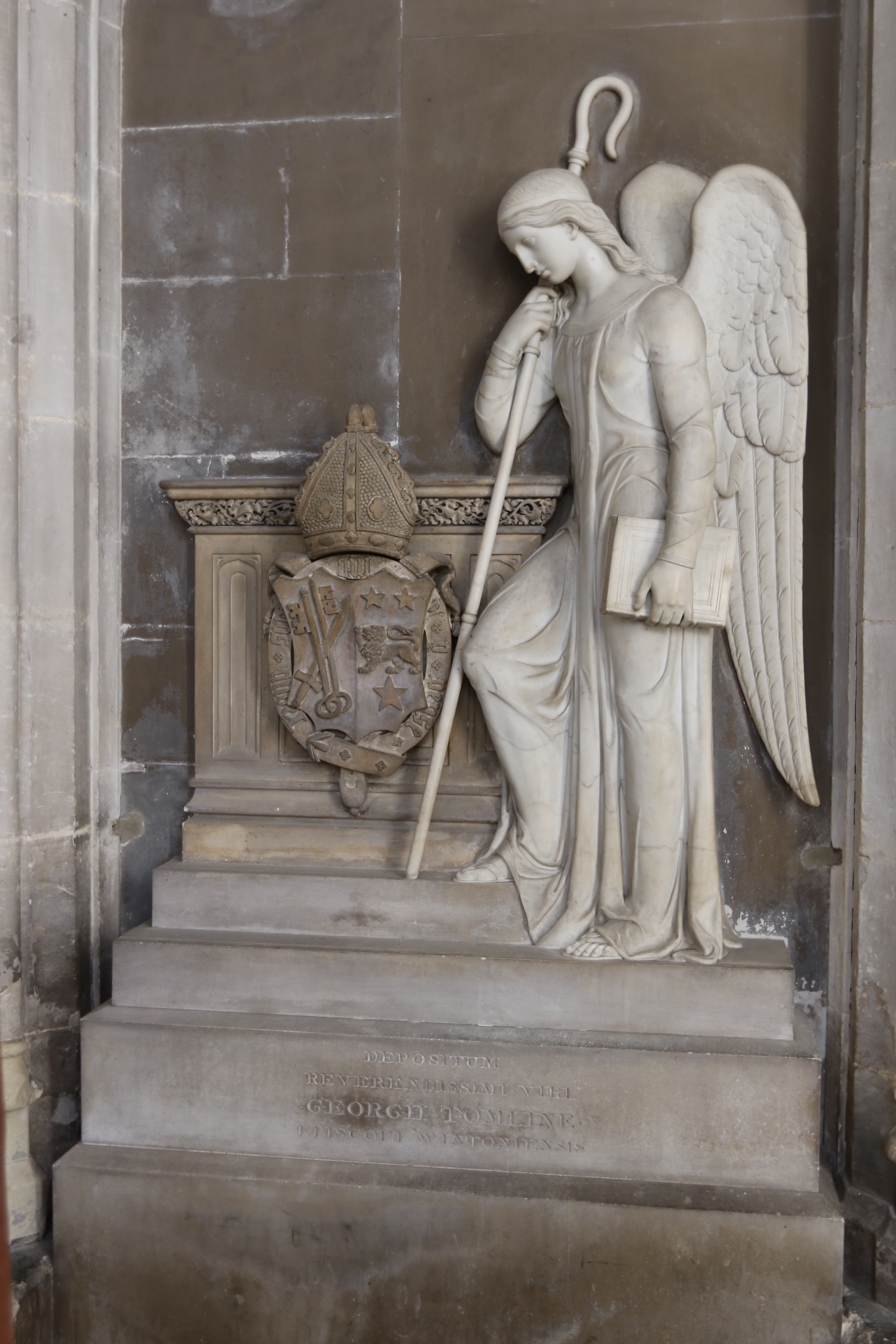
Memorial in Winchester Cathedral

Tomline had inherited further property before he died of apoplexy at Kingston Hall, near Wimborne, Dorset and his estate was worth £200,000 (equivalent to £18,274,454 in 2025). He was buried in Winchester Cathedral. His monument was sculpted by Richard Westmacott (the younger).

Tomline and his wife had three sons but they relinquished their claim to the baronetcy:

- William Edward Tomline (1787–1836), MP for, successively, Christchurch, Truro, and Minehead.
- George-Thomas Tomline, became Chancellor of Lincoln and prebendary of Winchester.
- Richard Tomline, his third son, became precentor of Lincoln.

== Works ==
Tomline published the following works:

- Elements of Christian Theology (1799), 2 vols., with the 12th and last edition printed in 1826. It was designed for candidates for ordination. Henry Stebbing published a revision, in 1843.
- A Refutation of Calvinism (1803), the 8th and final edition printed in 1823. This was a controversial work, causing a debate that involved Thomas Scott, Edward Williams, John Chetwode Eustace, and some anonymous writers.
- Memoir of the Life of the Right Honorable William Pitt, 2 vols. (John Murray, Albemarle-Street, London, 1821). It goes no further than 1793.

== Personality ==
He was an able administrator to his diocese, conducting eleven visitations during his thirty-three years' tenure.

Though to the inferior clergy there was unquestionably something over-awing in his presence, arising from their conscientiousness of his superior attainments, yet it was impossible not to admire the courtliness of his manners and the benevolence of his sentiments

— The Gentleman's Magazine, 1st ser., 98/1 (1828), 204)

Though he appeared somewhat aloof in public, Tomline was a devoted family man and genial enough given the right company. From 1806, he was conservative as to his attitudes to church and state but was well respected by someone of as different an outlook as Samuel Parr.

Tomline and his family were widely detested for their corrupt acquisition of lucrative posts within the Church. The Hampshire Independent thought him 'this pagan bishop' and there were many similar comments.

== Offices and honours ==
- Sinecure rectory of Corwen, Merioneth, (1782);
- Canon of Westminster, (1784);
- Doctor of Divinity, University of Cambridge, (1784);
- Rector of Sudbourn-cum-Offord, (1785);
- Fellow of the Royal Society, (1785);
- Dean of St Paul's, (1787–1820);
- Charles I had originally conferred a Nova Scotia baronetcy on John Pretyman but it had been dormant since 1749. In February 1823, Tomline's claim to the baronetcy was confirmed and he became Sir George Pretyman Tomline, 5th Baronet.

== Styles and titles ==
- 1750–1774: George Pretyman Esq.
- 1774–1784: The Reverend George Pretyman
- 1784–1787: The Reverend Canon Dr George Pretyman
- 1787–1787: The Very Reverend Dr George Pretyman
- 1787–1803: The Right Reverend Dr George Pretyman
- 1803–1823: The Right Reverend Dr George Pretyman Tomline
- 1823–1827: The Right Reverend Dr Sir George Pretyman Tomline, Baronet

== Sources ==
- Obituary:
  - The Gentleman's Magazine, 1st ser., 98/1 (1828), 201–4

- Alter, J-M (2024). A New Biography of William Pitt the Younger-Volume 1- Years of Establishment 1759-1798. Independent}. ISBN 979-8333204790.
- Burke, Sir Bernard (1863). A Genealogical and Heraldic Dictionary of the Landed Gentry of Great Britain and Ireland. London: Harrison. pp. p.1518. "william edward tomline."
- Cassan, S. H. (1827). The Lives of the Bishops of Winchester (2 vols. ed.). C. and J. Rivington.
- "Tomline, Sir George Pretyman". Oxford Dictionary of National Biography (online ed.). Oxford University Press. doi:10.1093/ref:odnb/27520. (Subscription, Wikipedia Library access or UK public library membership required.) (Retrieved 27 July 2015)
- (2005) "Sir George Pretyman-Tomline: Ecclesiastical Politician and Theological Polemicist" in Gibson, W.; Ingham, R. G., eds. (2005). Religious Identities in Britain, 1660–1832. Ashgate. ISBN 0-7546-3209-1.
- Gooding, Roy (2003). "George Tomline & Relatives". Orwell Astronomical Society. Archived from the original on 2 August 2005.
- Hague, William (2005). William Pitt the Younger. HarperPerennial. ISBN 978-0-00-714720-5.
- Nockles, P. B. (1994). The Oxford Movement in Context: Anglican High Churchmanship, 1760–1857.
- Payne, R. (2008) 'George Pretyman, bishop of Lincoln, and the University of Cambridge 1787–1801', CCEd Online Journal 3, 2008
- Ecclesiastical Patronage in England, 1770–1801: A Study of Four Family and Political Networks. Mellen Press. 2010. ISBN 978-0-7734-3789-0.
- Sack, J. J. (1993). From Jacobite to Conservative: Reaction and Orthodoxy in Britain, c. 1760–1832.

Church of England titles
Preceded by Thomas Thurlow	Dean of St Paul's; 1787–1820	Succeeded by William Van Mildert
Preceded by Thomas Thurlow	Bishop of Lincoln; 1787–1820	Succeeded by George Pelham
Preceded by Brownlow North	Bishop of Winchester; 1820–1827	Succeeded by Charles Sumner
Baronetage of Nova Scotia
Preceded by Dormant	Baronet (of Lodington); 1823–1827	Dormant
