= Carmichael baronets =

There have been three baronetcies created for persons with the surname Carmichael, two in the Baronetage of Nova Scotia and one in the Baronetage of the United Kingdom.

- Carmichael baronets of Westraw (1627): see Lord Carmichael
- Carmichael, later Carmichael-Baillie baronets of Bonington (c.1676): see Carmichael-Baillie baronets
- Carmichael-Smyth, later Carmichael baronets of Nutwood (1821)
