= Prestonfield House =

Hotel in Prestonfield, Edinburgh, Scotland

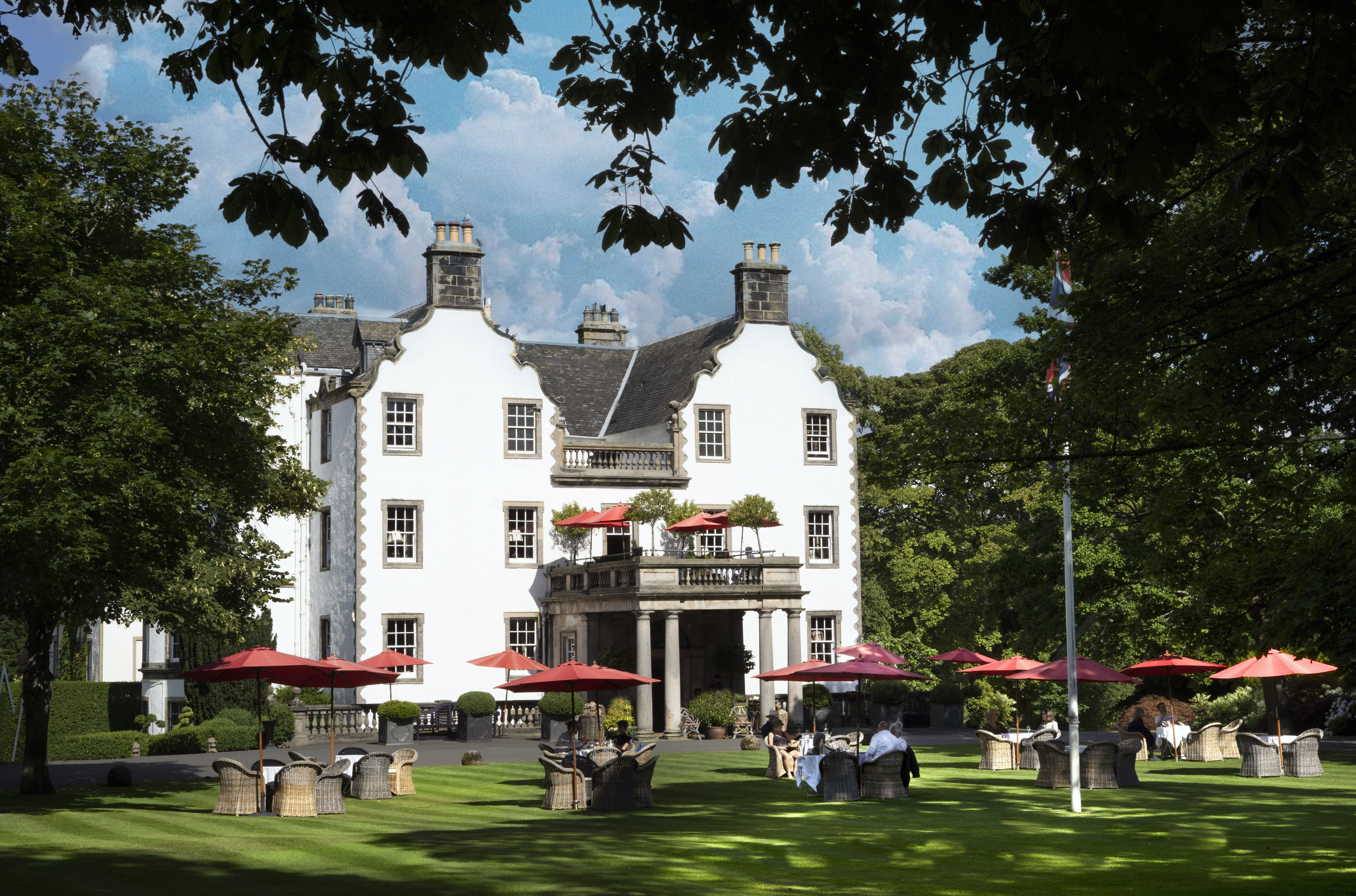
- Interactive map of the Prestonfield House area

General information
- Location: Priestfield Road, Edinburgh, Scotland
- Coordinates: 55.936426°N 3.157475°W
- Opening: 1960s

Other information
- Number of suites: 23
- Number of restaurants: 1

Website
- www.prestonfield.com

Designations

Inventory of Gardens and Designed Landscapes in Scotland
- Official name: Prestonfield House (Priestfield)
- Designated: 30 June 1987
- Reference no.: GDL00319

Prestonfield House is a boutique hotel in Prestonfield, Edinburgh, Scotland. Originally built in 1687 by architect Sir William Bruce, it was once considered a wealthy rural estate, however in recent decades, it has come to serve as a hotel. Although it falls on the small side as an establishment, having only 23 rooms, it is well-known to hotel and hospitality critics. The hotel is at the foot of Arthur's Seat and has a large roundhouse, previously used for keeping horses. The stables were repurposed and now host events, including the "Taste of Scotland Festival".

== History ==
Originally known as Priestfield, the site was once a wealthy monastery, founded in 1150 by Henry, Earl of Northumbria.

Circa 1510, Walter Chepman built Priestfield House on the site. Thomas Hamilton, Lord Priestfield was clearly living in the house in 1607, when he adopted Prestonfield as his style as a Senator of the College of Justice.

James Dick bought the house in 1671. It burned down during an anti-Catholic riot in 1681. Dick employed Sir William Bruce to design a replacement building, which was then renamed Prestonfield, distancing it from its Catholic connections.

The house remained the home of the Dick baronets for many centuries.

In 1751 the house was inherited by Sir Alexander Dick from his elder brother William and his wife Anne Dick. The Dick family continued to modify and improve the estate, adding paintings, a new staircase with reception rooms and a porte-cochère. Most notably, the stable house was built in the 19th century, as designed by James Gillespie Graham. In the late 19th century it was the home of Sir William Hanmer Dick-Cunyngham, 8th Baronet of Prestonfield and Lambrughton. His son, Lieutenant Colonel William Henry Dick-Cunyngham VC (16 June 1851 – 6 January 1900) was a Scottish recipient of the Victoria Cross. He was in command of the 2nd Battalion Gordon Highlanders, in the Second Boer War where he was mortally wounded in action at the siege of Ladysmith.

The estate was converted for use as a hotel in the 1960s and, in 2003, the hotel was bought by restaurateur James Thomson.

In 2004 Mike Watson, Baron Watson of Invergowrie was charged and later convicted of Wilful fire raising after setting fire to a set of curtains in the hotel following a night of heavy drinking in The Stables at The Scottish Politician of the Year party.

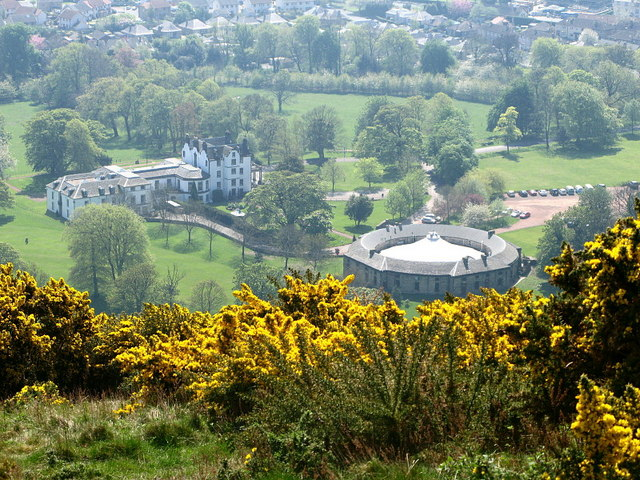
Prestonfield House, as viewed from Holyrood Park

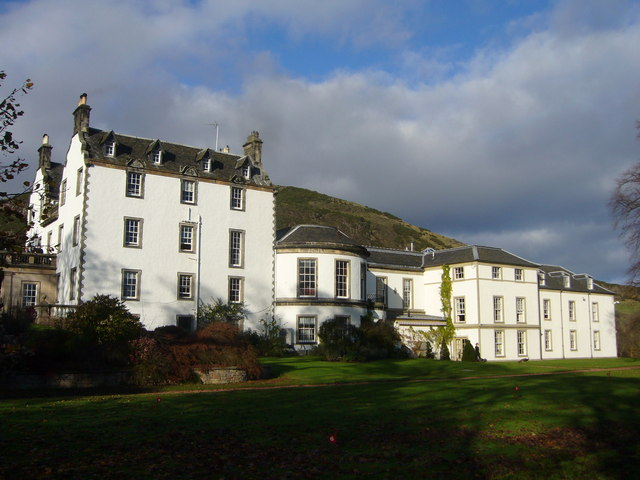
Prestonfield House, as viewed from the grounds

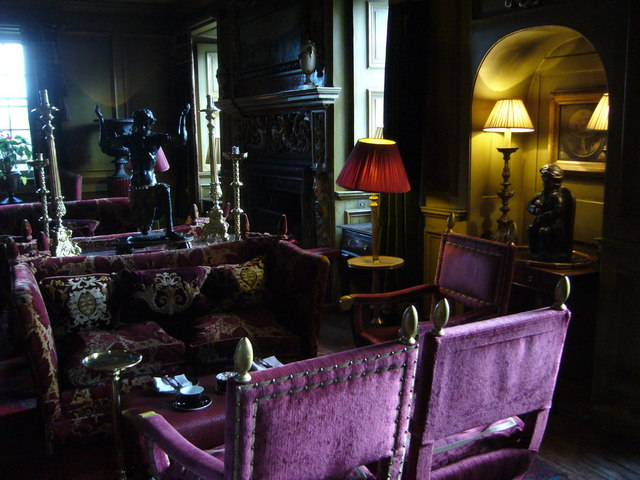
Lavish internal décor

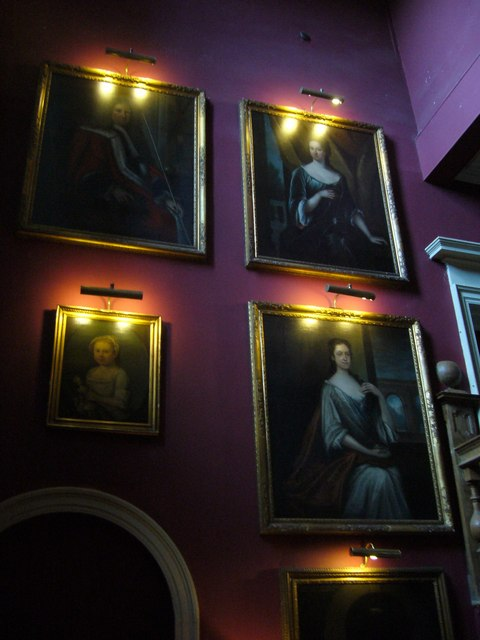
Dick family portraits inside the House
