= James Dick of Prestonfield =

Scottish merchant

- Born: c. 1644
- Died: 15 November 1728
- Occupations: Merchant; Lord Provost of Edinburgh

Sir James Dick, 1st Baronet (c. 1644 – 15 November 1728), better known as James Dick of Prestonfield, was a Scottish merchant who served as Lord Provost of Edinburgh from 1679 to 1681. He was the first Baronet of Prestonfield and was progenitor to the Dick baronets.

== Life ==
Dick was born around 1644. He was the son of Alexander Dick and his wife Helen Rocheid. Alexander Dick was the son of William Dick of Braid, a statesman who was Lord Provost of Edinburgh from 1638 to 1640, and who had loaned the city £45,000 in 1646.

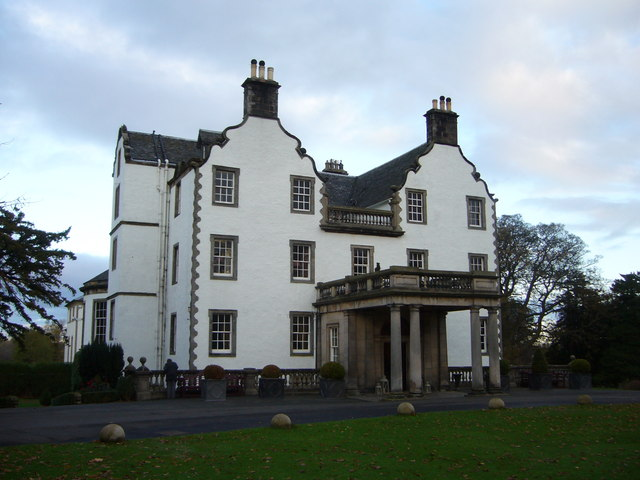
Prestonfield House

Dick was a merchant and Dean of Guild in Edinburgh. He purchased the Priestfield estate, including Priestfield House, in 1677. In 1679 he was elected Lord Provost of Edinburgh under the title of James Dick of Priestfield, in succession to Sir Francis Kinloch. In 1681/82 he was the Member of Parliament for Edinburgh.

Priestfield House was built by King James IV's printer, Walter Chepman. The house had a history of Catholic sympathy, which was tolerated in the Scottish upper classes despite being illegal. In 1681 the original house was burnt down in an anti-Catholic demonstration, and Dick employed the architect William Bruce to design a new house. The U-plan house, which had a formal garden attached, was not completed and occupied until 1689. It was then renamed Prestonfield House to distance it from the word priest, with its Catholic associations. James then became known as James Dick of Prestonfield and most records use this term, despite being technically incorrect in his earlier life.

Dick was made a baronet of Nova Scotia at the Union of 1707. (Note: Burke's Peerage states 1677.) In 1713 he purchased the estate of Corstorphine from Hugh Wallace of Ingliston who had purchased it from the Forresters, the traditional family in that area, in 1698.

Dick died on 15 November 1728.

== Family ==
Dick married Anne Paterson, the daughter of William Paterson of Dunmure (or Drumure) in Fife.

Their daughter Janet married William Cunningham of Caprington. Their son William inherited the baronetcy in 1728, and readopted the surname Dick (sometimes Dick-Cunningham).

== Notes ==
Baronetage of Nova Scotia
New creation	Baronet (of Prestonfield); 1677–1728	Succeeded by William Dick
