= Sir William Keith, 4th Baronet =

Colonial Governor of Pennsylvania

Sir William Keith Bt
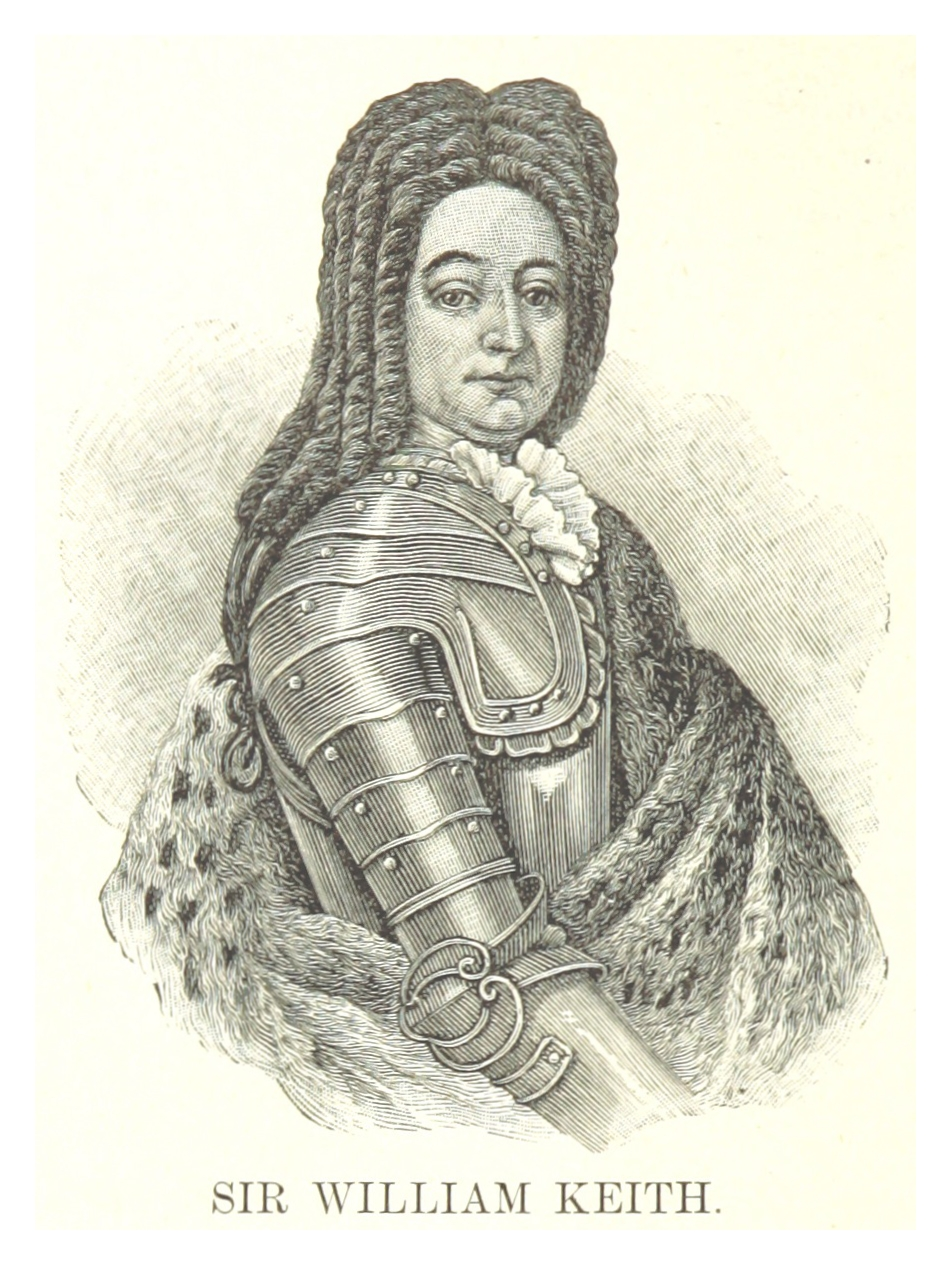

Colonial Governor of Pennsylvania
- In office 1717–1726

Personal details
- Born: 1669 Boddam Castle, Scotland
- Died: 18 November 1749 (aged 79–80) London, Great Britain

Sir William Keith, 4th Baronet (1669 – 18 November 1749) was a Scottish colonial administrator who served as lieutenant-governor of the British colonies of Pennsylvania and Delaware, from 1717 to 1726.

== Early life ==
Keith was born in Boddam Castle near Peterhead, Scotland, to Sir William Keith, 3rd Baronet, of Ludquharn, Scotland and Lady Jean (Smith) Keith. He was baptised on 16 February 1680. As eldest son, he stood to inherit the baronetcy from his father. He studied at Marischal College, the University of Aberdeen from which he graduated a master of arts in 1687. The Keiths were Episcopalian and of Jacobite sympathies, so much so that Keith resided with the exiled court of the Pretender, at Saint-Germain-en-Laye and there became one of the Pretender's favourites.

Upon Queen Anne's accession to the throne in 1702, the Act of Indemnity 1703 was issued for former Jacobites, and many exiles returned to Great Britain. Keith was among these people, but quickly became involved in various Jacobite intrigues. In 1703, he was arrested under suspicion of treason.

== Political career ==
Under the rule of the Tories, Keith received an appointment as surveyor-general of the customers for the southern district of North America in 1714 and took up residence in Virginia. However, he lost his office when the Whigs took power under George I. Around this same time, Keith's father became implicated in the Jacobite rising of 1715 and fled to Saint-Germain-en-Laye. Keith applied for a position as lieutenant governor of Pennsylvania and its three lower counties (now Delaware). He voyaged to England and returned to America with a commission.

While serving as lieutenant governor, Keith resided in a country manor, Graeme Park in Horsham, Montgomery County, Pennsylvania. Popular with the colonists, he organised a militia (no small feat in a Quaker colony) and established a high court of chancery. He also arranged peace conferences with the Indians and promoted laws allowing wives of sailors at sea to become femme sole traders.

He also is noted for encouraging in 1723, a then 17-year-old Benjamin Franklin to try to set up his own printing business in Philadelphia. Franklin later claimed that Keith failed to come through with promised financial support; Keith had suggested Franklin travel to England to purchase equipment for the shop, but after he arrived there, Franklin found that Keith had not sent the promised letters of recommendation, and that no one who knew Sir William "had the smallest Dependence on him". Franklin remained in London for three years, and after returning to Philadelphia, did open a printing business two years later in 1728 with a different partner.

In 1718, William Penn died and Keith became involved in disputes with Penn's widow regarding the conduct of the colony. He sought favour with the colonists and tried desperately to achieve popularity. Two years later, his father died, and he succeeded to his father's baronetcy. However, his father died insolvent and Keith too became mired in debt.

Penn's widow and heirs joined forces against Keith and sought the nomination of a new lieutenant-governor from the crown. Keith published a vindication and led an opposition party. He gained election to the assembly, but did not achieve the role of speaker which he sought. After re-election to the assembly the following year, he fled the colony and returned to England in order to evade his creditors. His family remained in Philadelphia.

He advocated for a British imperial union for the Commonwealth.

== Later years and death ==
On his voyage back to England, Keith wrote "A Short Discourse on the Present State of the Colonies in America with respect to the Interest of Great Britain," in which he warned of French encroachment on British colonial territory and proposed a stamp tax on colonists in order to finance standing armies. While in England, he gave assistance to the London Board of Trade in negotiating a treaty with the Cherokee and continued to write on colonial matters. His dire financial situation prevented him from returning to Pennsylvania to reunite with his family and he was unable to finance their passage to England.

Throughout his life, Keith lived far beyond his means due to his love of lavish living. In the final years of his life, Keith lived in abject poverty and spent some time in debtors' prison. On 18 November 1749, he died at the Old Bailey in London. It is unclear if Keith was incarcerated at the time of his death or if he was renting an inexpensive room at the prison.

Baronetage of Nova Scotia
| Preceded by William Keith | Baronet (of Ludquharn) c. 1700–1749 | Succeeded by Robert Keith |
