= Keith baronets of Ludquharn (1629) =

Escutcheon of the Keith baronets of Ludquharn

The Keith baronetcy, of Ludquharn, Aberdeenshire (or Ludquhairn) was created in the Baronetage of Nova Scotia on 28 July 1629 for William Keith, son of Sir William Keith of Ludquharn and his wife Margaret, sister of George Keith, 5th Earl Marischal. The remainder was to all male heirs whatsoever.

The title became dormant on the death of the 5th Baronet in 1771. It does not appear, as of 2026, on the Official Roll of the Baronetage.

== Keith baronets, of Ludquharn (1629) ==
- Sir William Keith, 1st Baronet (1629–c. 1655)
- Sir Alexander Keith, 2nd Baronet (c. 1655–c. 1680)
- Sir William Keith, 3rd Baronet (c. 1680–c. 1700)
- Sir William Keith, 4th Baronet (c. 1700–1749), Governor of Pennsylvania
- Sir Robert Keith, 5th Baronet (1749–1771)
