= Dick-Cunyngham baronets of Lambrughton (1669) =

Escutcheon of the Dick-Cunyngham baronets of Lambrughton

The Dick-Cunyngham baronetcy of Lambrughton, Ayr was created in the Baronetage of Nova Scotia for John Cunningham in 1669. Merged with the Dick baronetcy of Prestonfield in 1829, it became extinct in 1941. From 1683 the family seat was at Caprington, Ayrshire and from 1740 at Prestonfield.

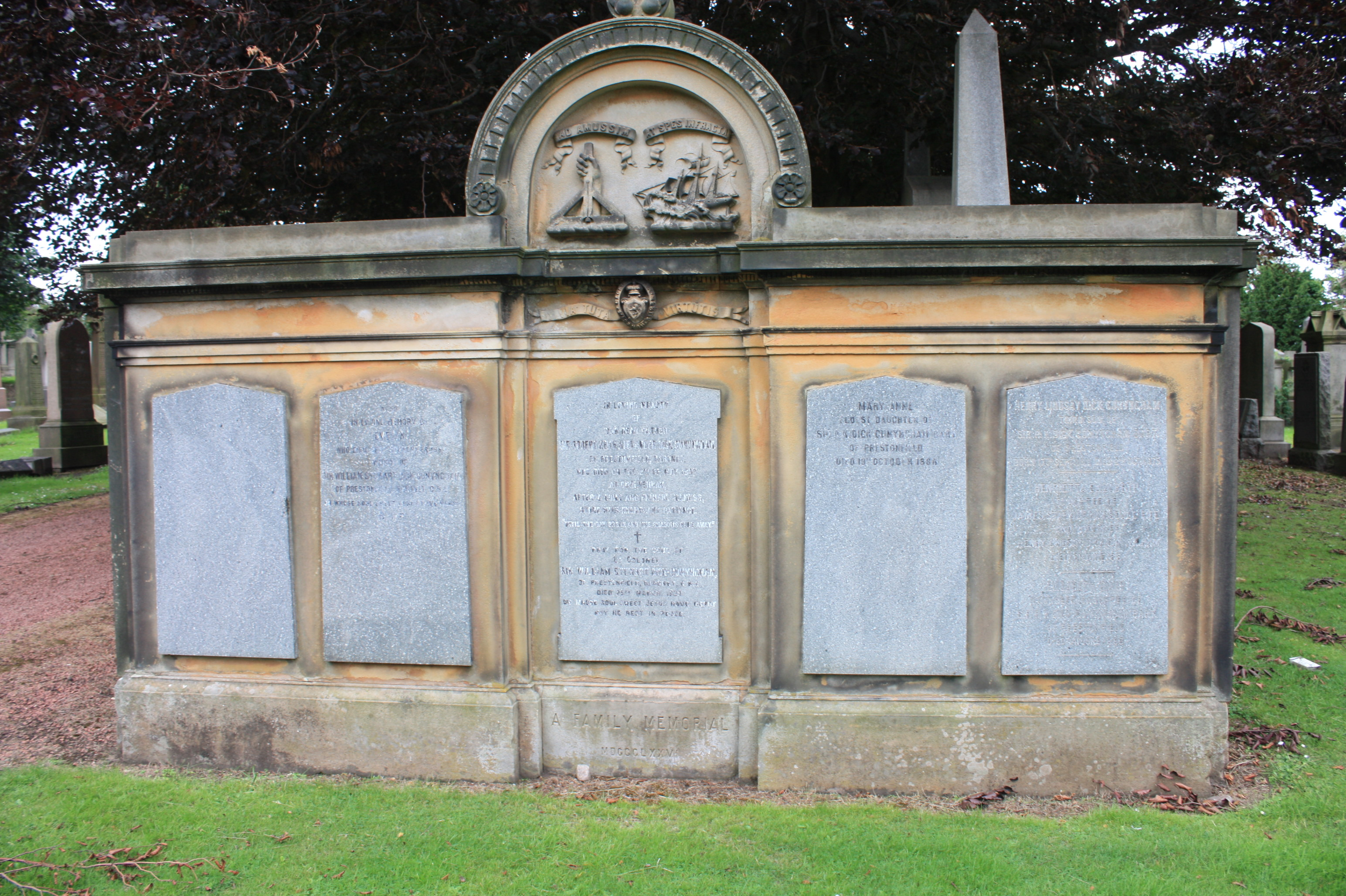
The Dick-Cunyngham memorial, Grange Cemetery, Edinburgh

== Dick-Cunyngham baronets of Lambrughton, Ayr (1669) ==
- Sir John Cunningham, 1st Baronet (died 1684)
- Sir William Cunningham, 2nd Baronet (1664–1740)
- Sir John Cunningham, 3rd Baronet (c.1696–1777)
- Sir William Cunningham, 4th Baronet (1752–1829)
- Sir Robert Keith Dick, 5th Baronet (Dick-Cunyngham from 1845) (1773–1849)
- Sir William Hanmer Dick-Cunyngham, 6th Baronet (1808–1871)
- Sir Robert Keith Alexander Dick-Cunyngham, 7th Baronet (1836–1897)
- Sir William Stewart Dick-Cunyngham, 8th Baronet (1871–1922)
- Sir Colin Keith Dick-Cunyngham, 9th Baronet (1908–1941). He left no heir, and the baronetcy became extinct on his death.
