= Hepburn-Murray baronets =

Extinct baronetcy in the Baronetage of Nova Scotia

The Murray, later Hepburn-Murray Baronetcy, of Glendoich in the County of Perth, was a title in the Baronetage of Nova Scotia. It was created on 2 July 1676 for Thomas Murray. The third Baronet assumed the additional surname of Hepburn in circa 1703. The title became extinct on the death of the fifth Baronet in circa 1774.

== Murray, later Hepburn-Murray baronets, of Glendoich (1676) ==
- Sir Thomas Murray, 1st Baronet (died 1684)
- Sir Thomas Murray, 2nd Baronet (died 1701)
- Sir John Hepburn-Murray, 3rd Baronet (died 1714)
- Sir Patrick Hepburn-Murray, 4th Baronet (1706–1756)
- Sir Alexander Hepburn-Murray, 5th Baronet (1754 – c. 1774)
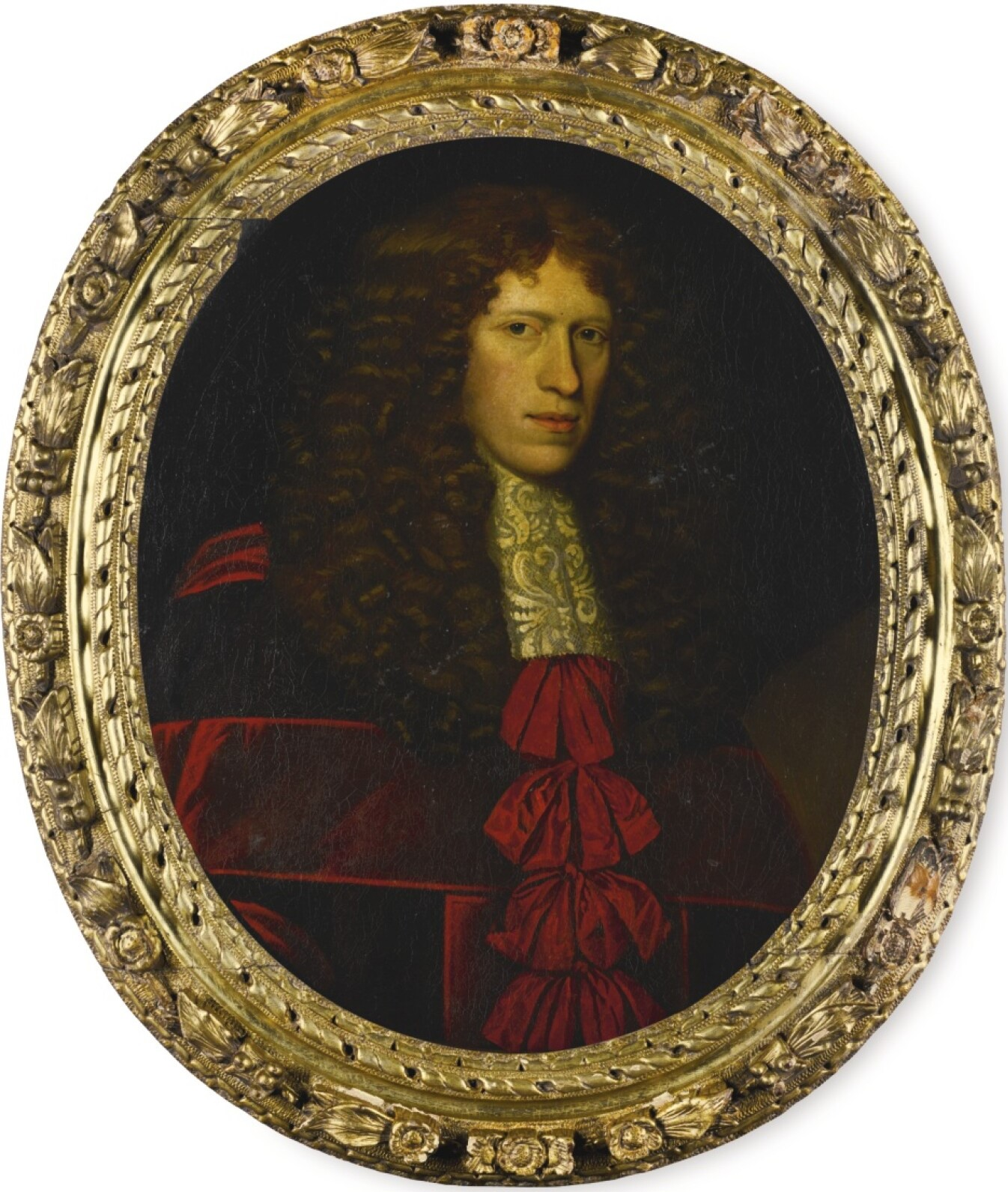
Sir Thomas Murray, 1st Baronet

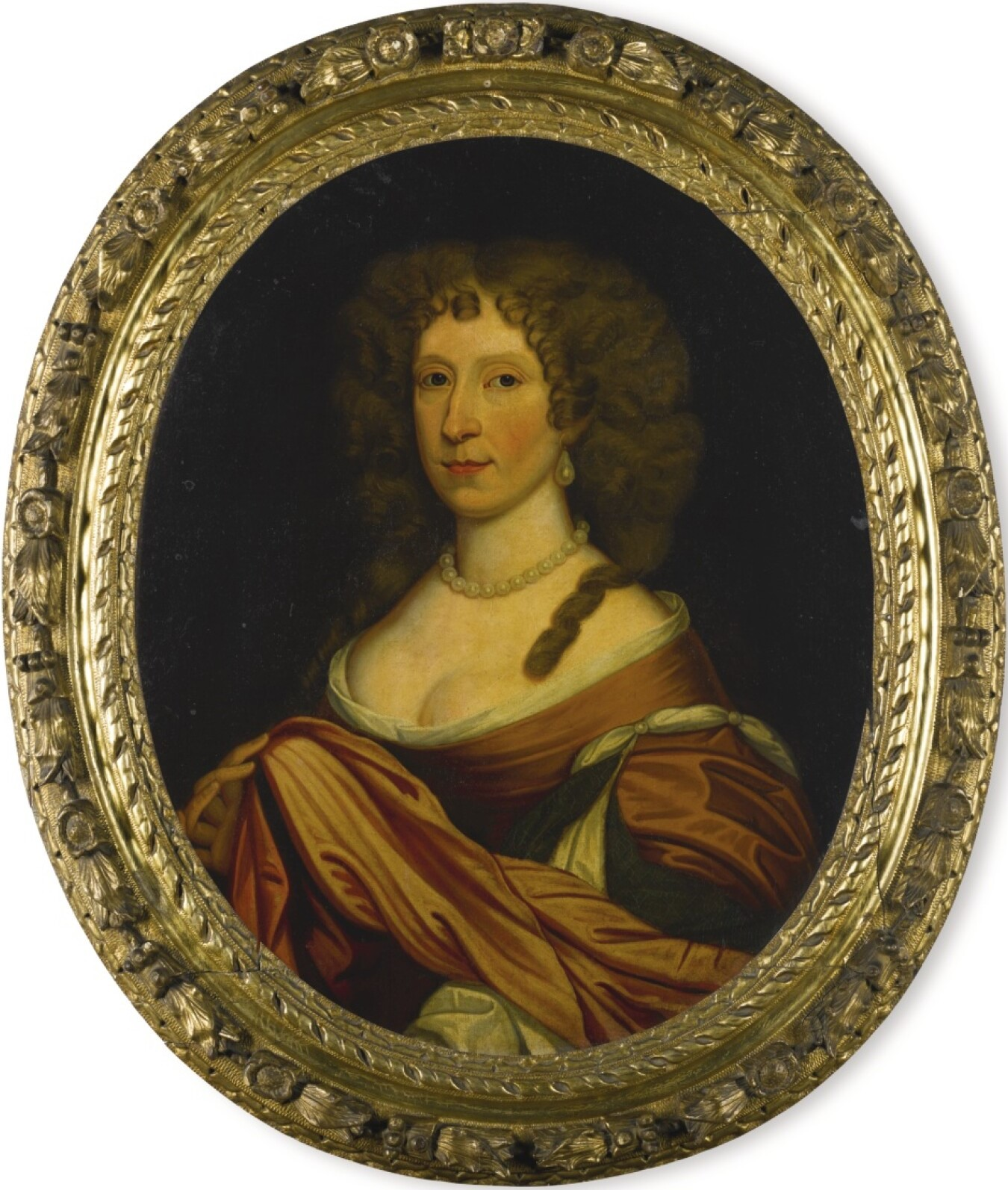
Barbara Hepburn, Lady Glendoick
