= Sir Robert Barr, 1st Baronet =

Sir Robert Barr, 1st Baronet of Glasgow, Lanarkshire died c.1629 having been made a baronet of Nova Scotia 29 September 1628. He had been a burgess of Glasgow. On his death the baronetcy became dormant.

Baronetage of Nova Scotia
New creation	Baronet (of Glasgow); 1628–c.1629	Extinct
