= Primrose baronets =

Set index for Primrose baronets

There have been three baronetcies for persons with the surname Primrose, two in the Baronetage of Nova Scotia and one in the Baronetage of the United Kingdom.

- Primrose baronets of Carrington (1651): see Viscount of Primrose and Earl of Rosebery
- Primrose baronets of Ravelstoun (1661): see Foulis baronets
- Primrose baronets of Redholme (1903)
