= Carmichael-Baillie baronets =

Extinct baronetcy in the Baronetage of Nova Scotia

The Carmichael, later Carmichael-Baillie Baronetcy, of Bonington in the County of Lanark, was a title in the Baronetage of Nova Scotia. It was created in circa 1676 for James Carmichael. The fourth Baronet sat as Member of Parliament for Linlithgow. The fifth Baronet assumed the additional surname of Baillie. The title became either extinct or dormant on his death in 1738.

== Carmichael, later Carmichael-Baillie baronets, of Bonington (c. 1676) ==
- Sir James Carmichael, 1st Baronet (died c. 1681)
- Sir John Carmichael, 2nd Baronet (died 1691)
- Sir William Carmichael, 3rd Baronet (c. 1686–1691)
- Sir James Carmichael, 4th Baronet (c. 1690–1727)
- Sir William Carmichael-Baillie, 5th Baronet (died 1738)
