= Sir Alexander Dick, 3rd Baronet =

Scottish landowner and physician

Sir Alexander Dick Bt
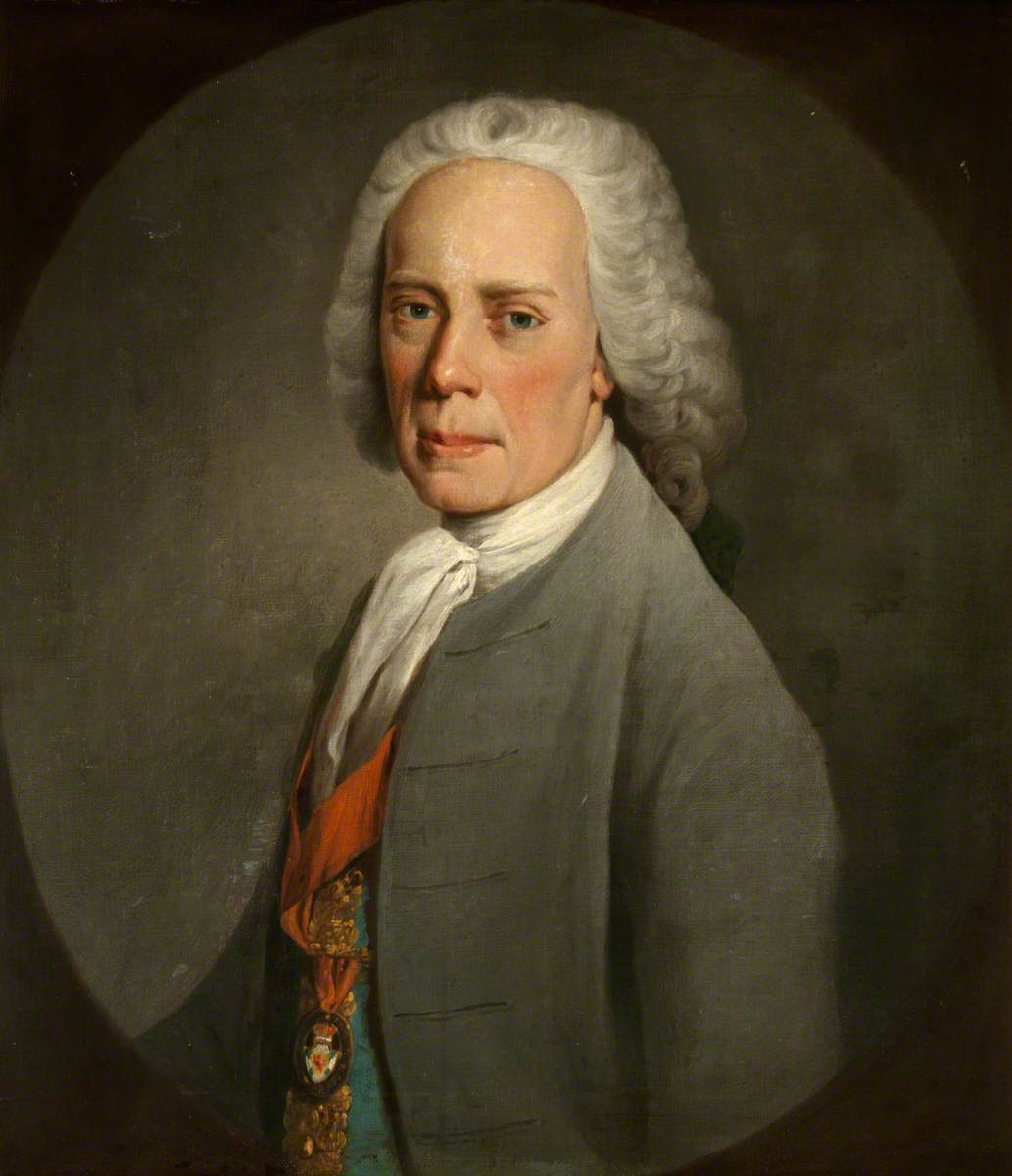

President of the Royal College of Physicians of Edinburgh
- In office 1756–1763

Personal details
- Born: Alexander Cunningham; 22 October 1703 Prestonfield House, Edinburgh
- Died: 10 November 1785 (aged 82) Great Britain
- Spouses: Janet Dick; Mary Butler
- Children: 12
- Parents: William Cunningham (father); Janet Dick (mother)
- Education: University of Edinburgh; University of Leyden; University of St Andrews

Sir Alexander Dick, 3rd Baronet FRSE, FSAScot (born Alexander Cunningham; 22 October 1703 – 10 November 1785) was a Scottish landowner and physician who served as president of the Royal College of Physicians of Edinburgh from 1756 to 1763.

== Life ==
Dick was born Alexander Cunningham at Prestonfield House, Edinburgh, the 3rd son of Sir William Cunningham, 2nd Baronet of Lambrughton and Caprington, Ayrshire and his wife Janet Dick, the only daughter and heiress of Sir James Dick, 1st Baronet of Prestonfield, Edinburgh. He changed his surname to Dick on the death in 1746 of his elder brother William, when he inherited the baronetcy and Prestonfield. He was educated at the Edinburgh High School and studied medicine at the University of Edinburgh, the University of Leyden and the University of St Andrews.

After qualifying as a physician, he set up in practice in Pembrokeshire prior to his inheritance. He was made a Fellow of the Royal College of Physicians of Edinburgh in 1727 and elected President of the Society from 1756 to 1763.

In 1753, with the Lord Provost, Robert Craigie, Lord Kames and Lord Drummore and Alexander Boswell, Lord Auchinleck he organised the site to create the Edinburgh Royal Exchange (which later became Edinburgh City Chambers.

He was also a fellow of the Society of Antiquaries of Scotland and in 1783 was a founding fellow of the Royal Society of Edinburgh.

He is mentioned in James Boswell's The Journal of a Tour to the Hebrides with Samuel Johnson (1785).

== Family ==
He married twice, firstly in 1736 to Janet Dick, and secondly in 1762 to Mary Butler. He left 3 sons and 5 daughters, out of 12 total children. He was succeeded by his eldest son William, the 4th Baronet.

Baronetage of Nova Scotia
Preceded by William Dick	Baronet (of Prestonfield); 1746–1785	Succeeded by William Dick
