= Marshall baronets =

Extinct baronetcy in the Baronetage of Nova Scotia

The Marshall Baronetcy was a title in the Baronetage of Nova Scotia. It was created on 21 May 1658 for William Marshall. The title became extinct on the death of the fourth Baronet in 1816.

== Marshall baronets (1658) ==
- Sir William Marshall, 1st Baronet (c. 1602 – 1658)
- Sir George Marshall, 2nd Baronet (died c. 1710)
- Sir William Marshall, 3rd Baronet (died 1772)
- Sir Charles Marshall, 4th Baronet (died 1816)
