= Weir baronets =

The Weir Baronetcy, of Blackwood was a title in the Baronetage of Nova Scotia created on 28 November 1694 for George Weir. He was succeeded by his sons, the second and third baronets. The baronetcy became extinct on the death of the third baronet in 1735.

== Weir baronets, of Blackwood (1694) ==
- Sir George Weir, 1st Baronet (died 1716)
- Sir William Weir, 2nd Baronet (died 1722)
- Sir George Weir, 3rd Baronet (died 1735)
