= Keith baronets =

Set index for Keith baronets

There have been three baronetcies for the surname Keith, all in the Baronetage of Nova Scotia and all now extinct.

- Keith baronets (1625): see Earl Marischal
- Keith baronets of Ludquharn (1629)
- Keith baronets of Powburn (1663): a title created for a descendant James or George Keith of William Keith, 2nd Earl Marischal, with seat at lands near Laurencekirk, for a Royalist. It became extinct on his death, perhaps in 1690, with leaving an heir.

== See also ==
- Earl of Kintore, where the title of the Baird baronets of Urie is now held with the surname Keith
