= Sir John Pretyman, 1st Baronet =

English politician

Sir John Pretyman, 1st Baronet (ca. 1612 – buried 1676) of Loddington, Leicestershire was an English politician.

He was the eldest son of Sir John Pretyman of Driffield, Gloucestershire and entered Lincoln's Inn in 1629 before matriculating at Queens' College, Cambridge in 1631. A royalist during the First English Civil War, he was present at the capture of Cirencester in 1642. He suffered financially and sold the family estate at Driffield.

He was a justice of the peace for Gloucestershire by 1641 to ?1646 and for Leicestershire from 1660 to his death and was appointed High Sheriff of Leicestershire for 1653–54.

The baronetcy was created for him in the Baronetage of Nova Scotia in 1641, or at the Restoration. He was Member of Parliament for Leicester from 1661 to 1676.

He married twice; firstly Elizabeth, the daughter and heiress of George Turpin of Horninghold, Leicestershire, with whom he had 4 sons and 4 daughters, and secondly Theodosia, daughter of Thomas Adams, merchant, of London, and the widow of Lionel Knyvett. He was succeeded by his son George, who also was MP for Leicester. His daughter Mary married Richard Verney, 11th Baron Willoughby de Broke.

Baronetage of Nova Scotia
New creation	Baronet (of Lodington) c.1660–1676	Succeeded by George Pretyman
