= Dalmahoy baronets =

The Dalmahoy Baronetcy, of Dalmahoy, was a title created in the Baronetage of Nova Scotia on 2 December 1679 for John Dalmahoy of that Ilk. The title became extinct upon the death of the fourth baronet, Sir Alexander Dalmahoy, in 1800.

== Dalmahoy baronets, of Dalmahoy (1679) ==
- Sir John Dalmahoy, 1st Baronet (1637–?)
- Sir Alexander Dalmahoy, 2nd Baronet (1668–1730)
- Sir Alexander Dalmahoy, 3rd Baronet (died 1773)
- Sir Alexander Dalmahoy, 4th Baronet (died 1800)
