= Pretyman baronets =

Dormant baronetcy in the Baronetage of Nova Scotia

The Pretyman Baronetcy, of Lodington, was a title in the Baronetage of Nova Scotia. It was created in circa 1660 for John Pretyman, later member of parliament for Leicester. The title became dormant on the death of the fourth Baronet in circa 1749. In 1823, George Pretyman Tomline, the Bishop of Winchester, successfully claimed the Baronetcy but his sons refused their claims to succession and it became again dormant.

== Pretyman baronets, of Lodington (c. 1660) ==
- Sir John Pretyman, 1st Baronet (c. 1612–1676)
- Sir George Pretyman, 2nd Baronet (1638–1715)
- Sir William Pretyman, 3rd Baronet (1641–1719)
- Sir Thomas Pretyman, 4th Baronet (c. 1670–c. 1749)
- Sir George Pretyman Tomline, 5th Baronet (1750–1827)
