= Cunningham baronets of Cunninghamhead (1627) =

Escutcheon of the Cunningham baronets of Cunninghamhead

The Cunningham baronetcy of Cuninghamhead in the parish of Dreghorn was created in the Baronetage of Nova Scotia on 4 July 1627 for William Cun(n)ingham, son of John Cuningham. He was Member of the Parliament of Scotland for Ayr in 1628, and again in 1639. The baronetcy became dormant on the 3rd Baronet's death without issue in 1724.

== Cunningham baronets of Cunninghamhead, Ayr ==
- Sir William Cunningham, 1st Baronet (died 1640)
- Sir William Cunningham, 2nd Baronet (died 1670)
- Sir William Cunningham, 3rd Baronet (died 1722)
