= William Dick of Braid =

Scottish merchant and financier

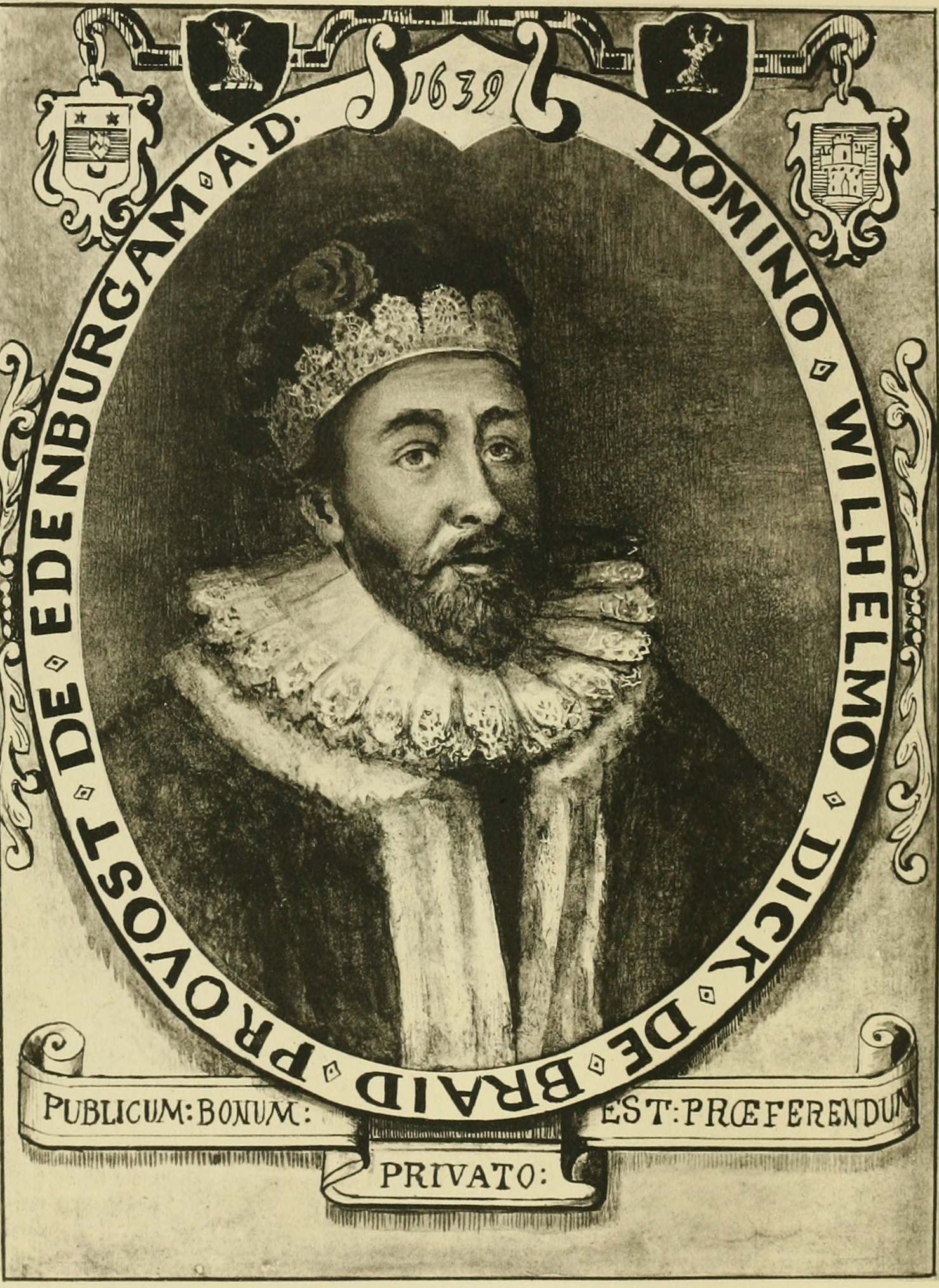
William Dick of Braid in 1640

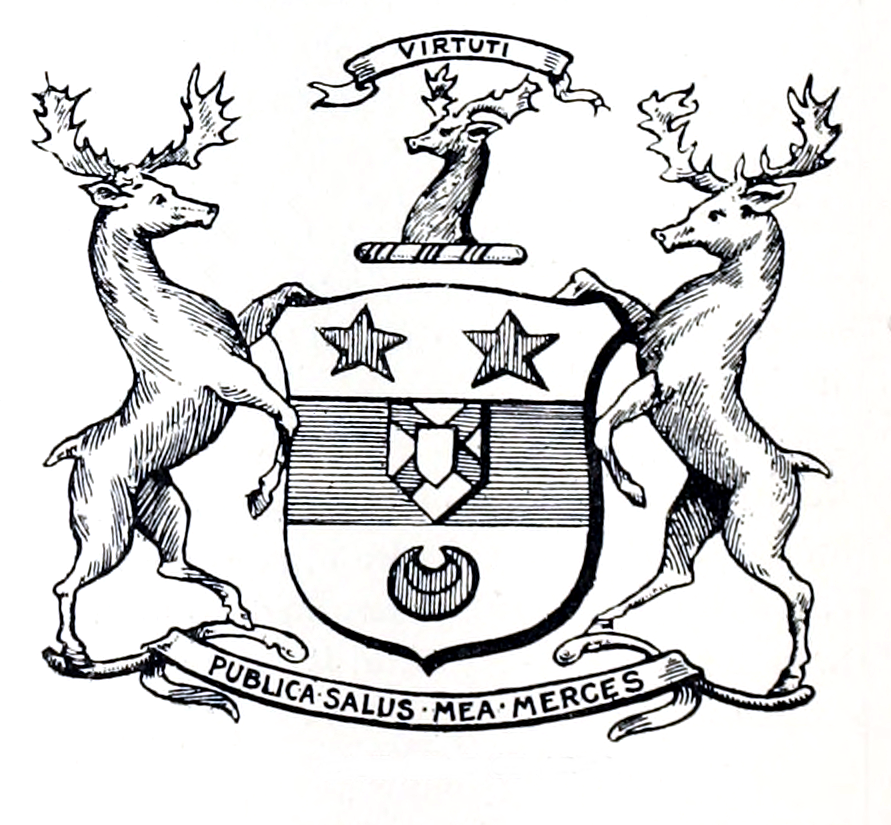
William Dick of Braid's Coat of Arms

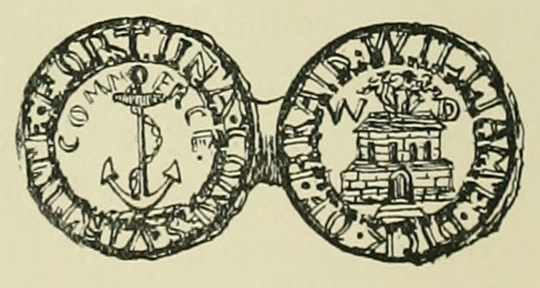
William Dick coinage

Sir William Dick of Braid (1580–1655) was a 17th-century Scottish landowner, banker and merchant who served as Lord Provost of Edinburgh from 1638 to 1640. His fortunes took him from being "the richest man in Scotland" in 1650 to his death as a pauper a few years later.

== Life ==
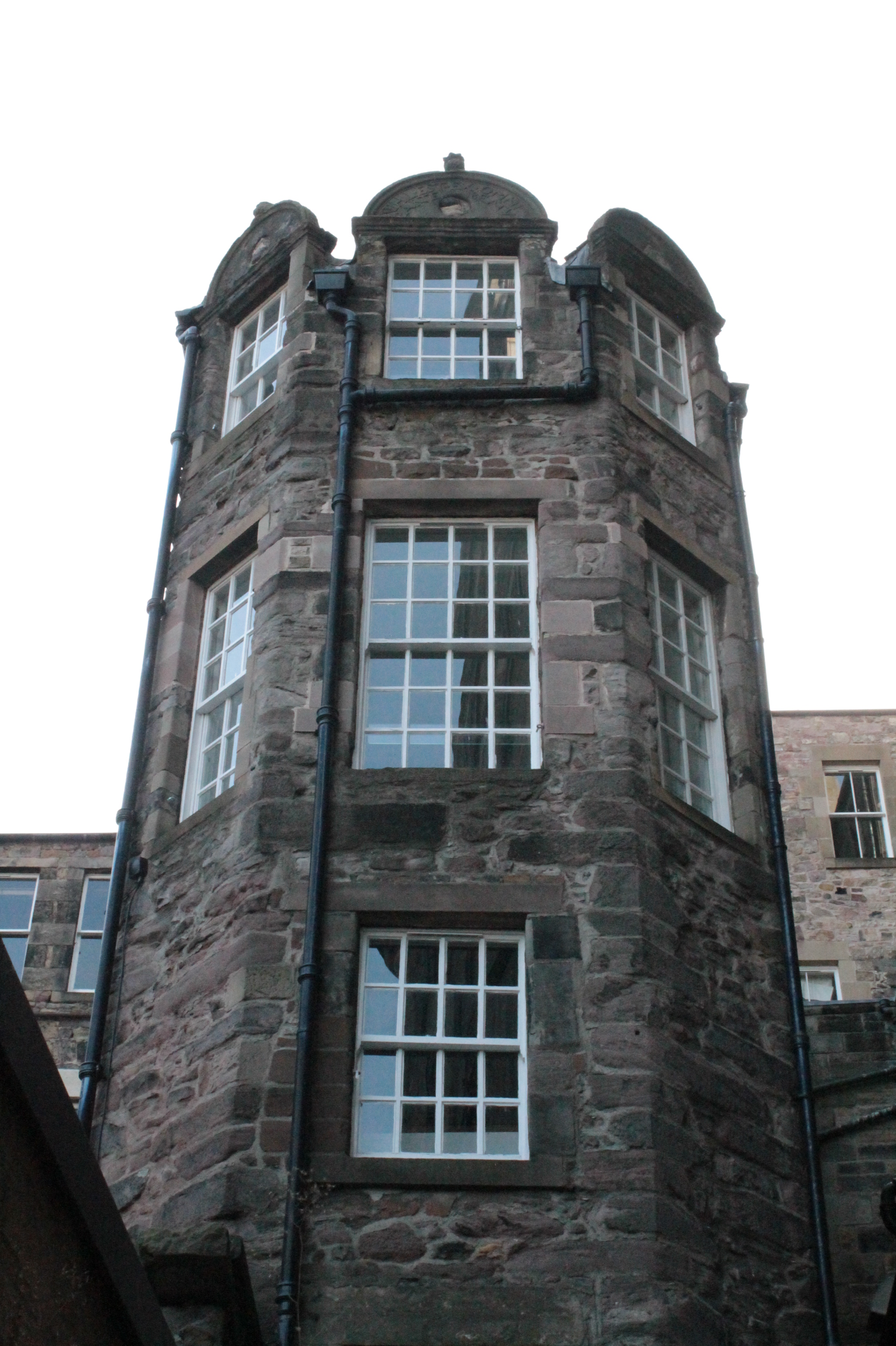
William Dick's house off the Royal Mile now known as Adam Bothwell's House

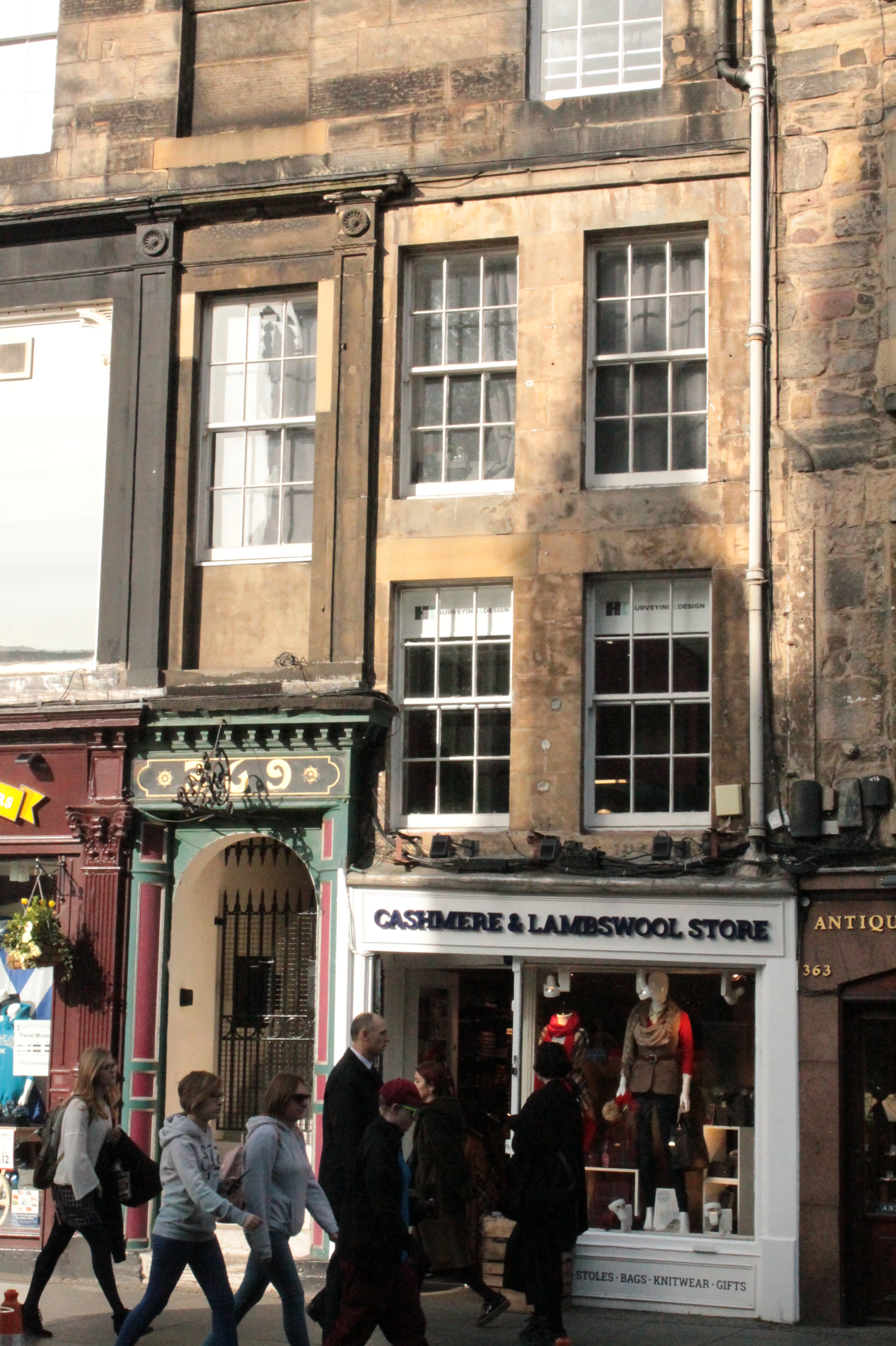
369 High Street, Royal Mile, Edinburgh

He was born in 1580 at Braid Castle, then south-west of Edinburgh (now enveloped by the city) close to what is now Hermitage of Braid. He was the son of John Dick and his wife, Margaret Stewart. John Dick had much land in Orkney and had also assembled much wealth trading with Denmark. William had an income of £3000 per annum from farm rentals in Orkney.

As a banker in 1617 he loaned £66,666 to the treasurer-depute Gideon Murray for the visit of James VI and I to Scotland, indicating his enormous wealth and power. In 1639 he loaned the Covenanting Army under James Graham, Marquess of Montrose a staggering £200,000 (£24 million in current terms).

He had an Edinburgh townhouse on the Royal Mile between Byers Close and Advocates Close, immediately opposite St Giles Cathedral. Much of this building (which he built in 1630) still survives (behind a new office on Advocates Close) and is known by the name of an earlier occupier of the site as Adam Bothwell's House. Dick would have had offices, his "bank", here at 369 High Street. An interior from around 1630 may have been added by Dick as it includes a built in safe within the timber panelling. He acquired this building from John Byres of Coates, also a banker. He had a large warehouse in the Luckenbooths close to his house on Byers Close, next to St Giles Cathedral.

In 1638 he succeeded John Hay of Lands as Provost of Edinburgh. He was succeeded in turn in 1640 by Alexander Clerk of Pittencrieff. He was knighted in 1641 by King Charles I of England, to whom he had loaned at least £20,000. In 1641 he gave 100,000 Scots merks to the Covenanter Army to enable it to continue as a force, and additionally paid for 10,000 soldiers in the Scots army to enforce the Protestant presence in Ulster.

In 1642 he leased the Edinburgh customs house (near the Netherbow) at a cost of 202,000 merks per annum.

During the English Civil War his Royalist sympathies came home to roost when Cromwell's troops camped at the Braid and demanded compensation for his loyalist support. He was forced to pay £65,000 representing the bulk of his wealth He afterwards went to London to try to recover this money. His efforts instead ended with his being heavily fined by the Cromwellian authorities.

He died on 19 December 1655. Although some records state he died in prison, he had been confined in private lodgings in Westminster in London. A collection was required to pay for his funeral and his grave had no stone memorial and is lost.

Following his death his Edinburgh property was sold to John Keith, 1st Earl of Kintore. The Royal Mile house was misidentified as Adam Bothwell's house around 1870 during the renewal of interest in "romantic history" by Victorian writers and is a category A listed building. All that survives of Braid Castle is the doocot and remnant boundary walls and foundations amongst the trees in the Braid Woods.

"Provost Dick" is mentioned in Sir Walter Scott's novel The Heart of Midlothian.

== Family ==
He married Elizabeth Morrison. Their children included:

- John Dick of Braid (1610-1642), father of William Dick of Braid and John Dick (died 1681), who settled as a merchant in London
- Alexander Dick of Heugh (1618-1663), was the ancestor of the Dick-Cunyngham baronets and the Dicks of Prestonfield, including James Dick of Prestonfield, Lord Provost 1679/81 .
- Andrew Dick of Craig House, who married (1) Christina Morrison, (2) Jean Leslie, a daughter of Sir John Leslie of Newton
- William Dick, 1st Baron of Grange, who married Janet McMath, widow of Thomas Bannatine. Their children included William Dick, 2nd Baron of Grange.
- Lewis Dick
- Elizabeth Dick
- Janet Dick
- Katherine Dick married William Nisbet of Dean.

== Bibliography ==
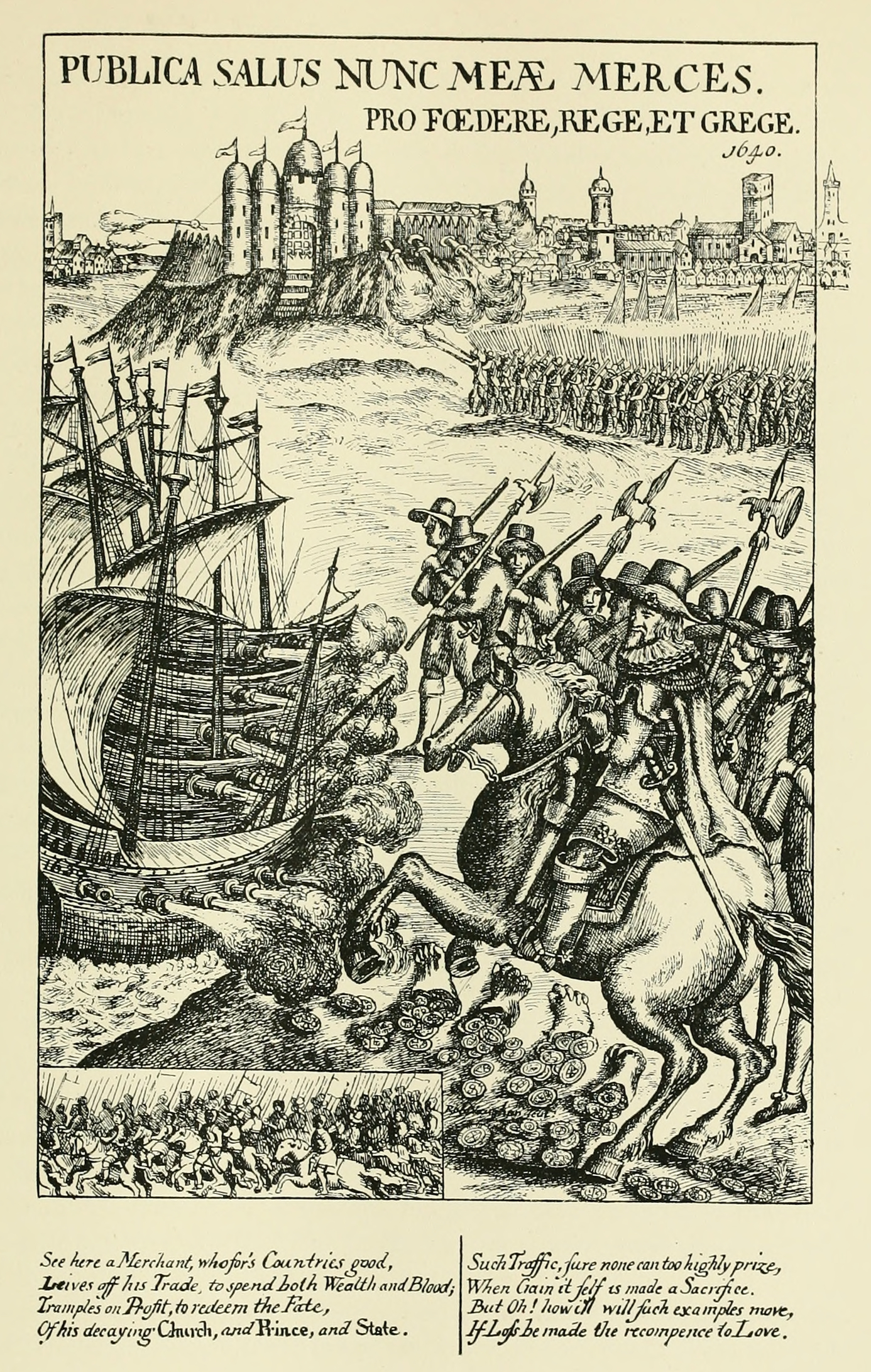
William Dick of Braid's downfall

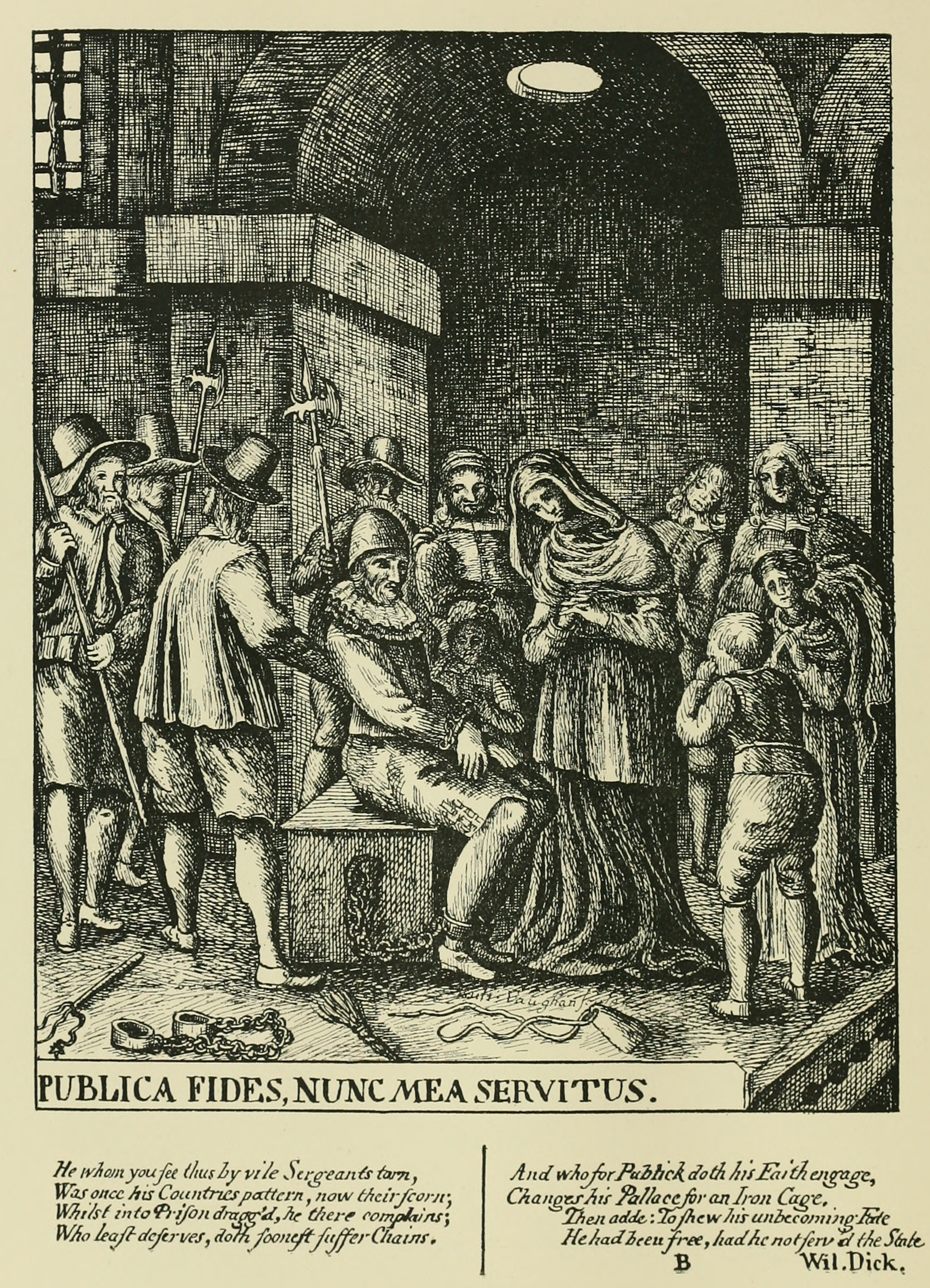
Sir William Dick of Braid - imprisonment

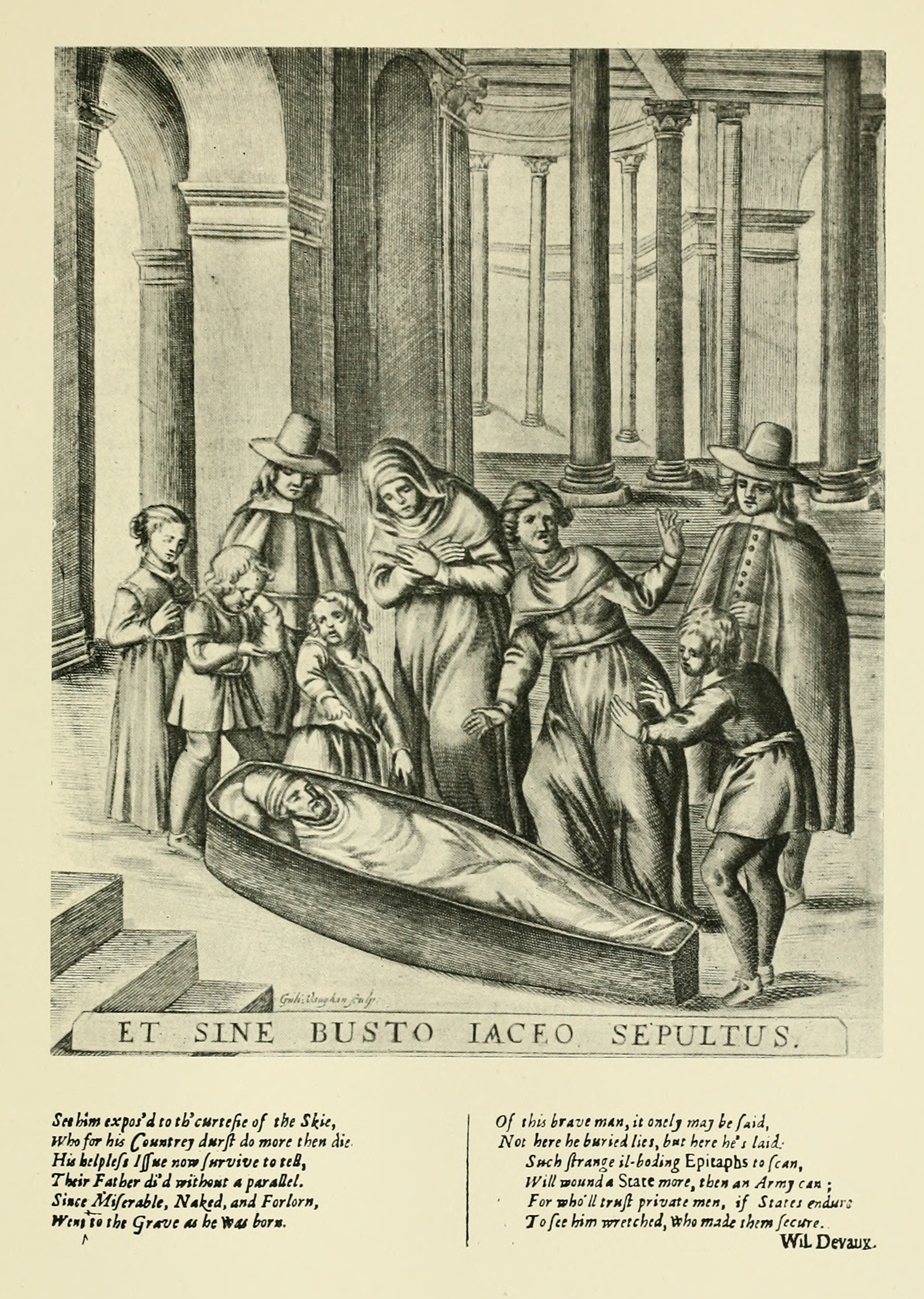
William Dick of Braid's burial

- The Lamentable Estate and Distressed Case of Sir William Dick, published in 1657, contains the petition of his family and other papers, the originals of which are included in the Lauderdale Papers, Addit. MS. 23113. His case is set forth in verse as well as in prose, and is pathetically illustrated by three copperplates, one representing him on horseback superintending the unloading of one of his rich argosies, the second as fettered in prison, and the third as lying in his coffin surrounded by disconsolate friends who do not know how to dispose of the body. The tract, of which there is a copy in the British Museum, is much valued by collectors, and has been sold for 52l. 10s.
- Acts of the Parliament of Scotland
- Balfour's Annals
- Spalding's Memorials
- Gordon's Scots Affairs
- State Papers, Dom. Ser. 1652-3
- Douglas's Baronage of Scotland, i. 269-70
- Notes and Queries, 3rd ser. vi. 457.
