= Rayney baronets =

Extinct baronetcy in the Baronetage of England

- Escutcheon of the Rayney Baronets of Wrotham
- Creation date: 1635 and 1642
- Status: extinct
- Extinction date: 1721 (1642 creation)
- Seat(s): Wrotham Place

The Rayney Baronetcy, of Wrotham in the County of Kent, was a title in both the Baronetage of Nova Scotia and the Baronetage of England. It was first created in the Baronetage of Nova Scotia on 19 December 1635 for Sir John Rayney of Wrotham Place, Wrotham, Kent. He was then created a Baronet in the Baronetage of England on 22 January 1642, with the same territorial designation. Rayney's father John Rayney, of West Malling, was a merchant and Alderman of London who bought Wrotham Place which became the family seat. The first Baronet had been knighted at the Coronation of Charles I in 1626. He served as High Sheriff of Kent in 1646. On the death of the fifth Baronet in 1721 the English baronetcy became extinct while the Scottish baronetcy became dormant.

== Rayney baronets, of Wrotham (1635/1642) ==
- Sir John Rayney, 1st Baronet (1601–1661)
- Sir John Rayney, 2nd Baronet (1627–1680)
- Sir John Rayney, 3rd Baronet (1660–1705)
- Sir John Beaumont Rayney, 4th Baronet (1688–1716)
- Sir Thomas Rayney, 5th Baronet (1690–1721)
