= Cunningham baronets of Auchinhervie (2nd creation, 1673) =

Escutcheon of the Cunningham baronets of Auchinhervie

The Cunningham baronetcy (or Cuningham) of Auchinhervie in the parish of Stewarton, Ayrshire, was created in the Baronetage of Nova Scotia on 3 August 1673 for Robert Cunningham, physician in Scotland for King Charles II of Great Britain. It was short-lived, the 2nd Baronet dying the following year leaving no children.

== Cunningham baronets of Auchinhervie, Ayr (2nd creation, 1763) ==
- Sir Robert Cunningham, 1st Baronet (died 1674)
- Sir Robert Cunningham, 2nd Baronet (died 1674)
