= Dick baronets =

Extinct baronetcy in the Baronetage of Nova Scotia

Escutcheon of the Dick baronets of Prestonfield

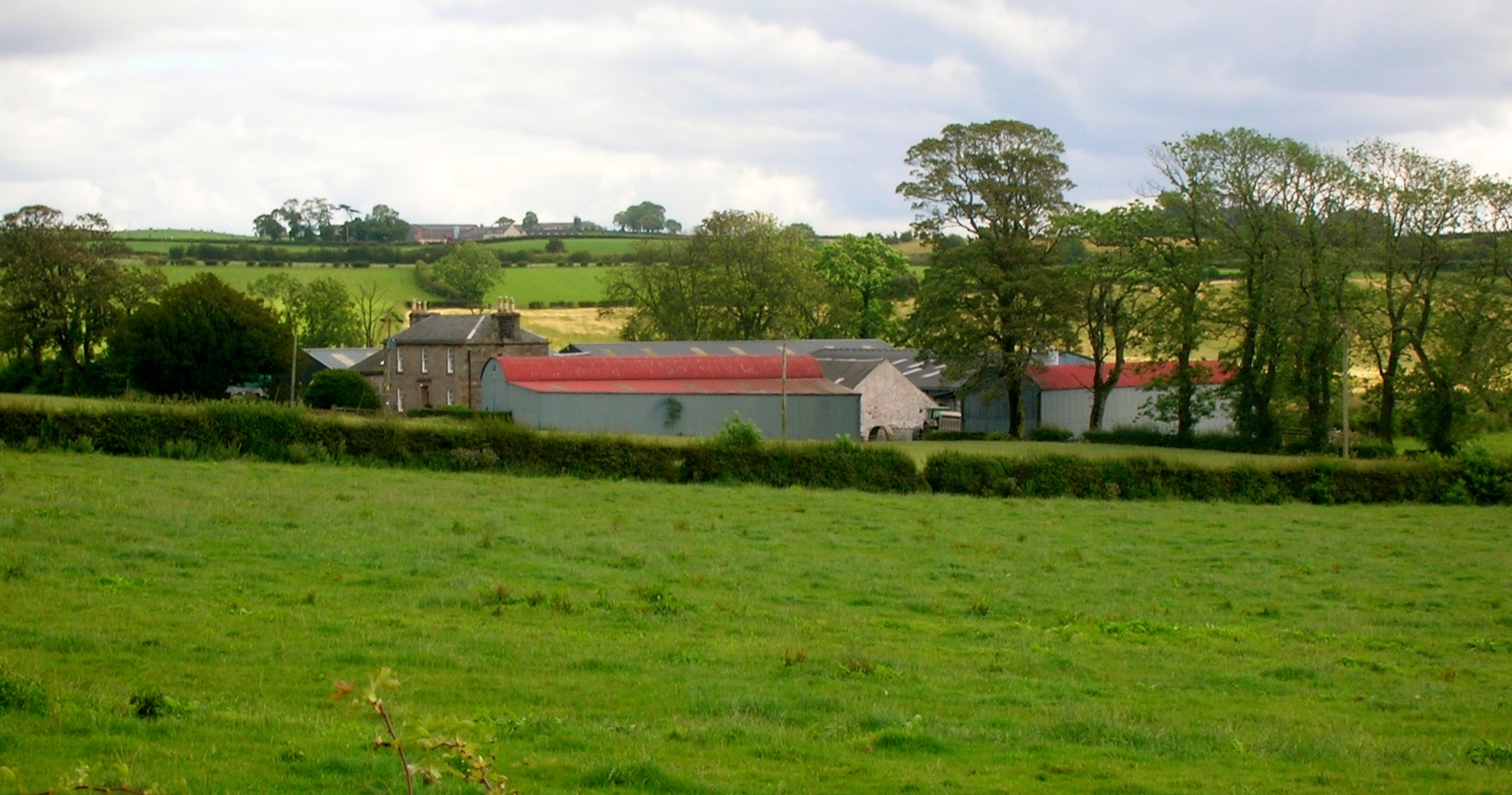
Townhead of Lambroughton, site of the original Lambroughton House.

The Dick baronetcy of Prestonfield, Edinburgh was created in the Baronetage of Nova Scotia on 2 March 1677 for James Dick, fourth son of William Dick of Braid, and Lord Provost of Edinburgh for 1682–3. It was renewed in 1707, with a special remainder.

The baronetcy merged with the Cunningham baronets of Lambrughton, Ayrshire. in 1829. The family seat was Prestonfield House, Edinburgh. Sir William Dick, 2nd Baronet and Sir Alexander Dick, 3rd Baronet were the younger sons of Sir William Cunningham, 2nd Baronet (of Lambrughton) and his wife Janet Dick, the daughter and heiress of Sir James Dick, 1st Baronet. Both brothers changed their surname to Dick on inheriting Prestonfield in turn.

== Dick baronets of Prestonfield (1677 and 1707) ==
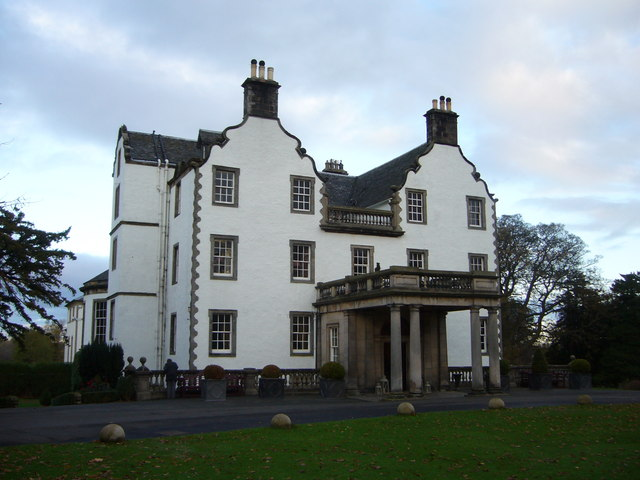
Prestonfield House south of Edinburgh

- Sir James Dick, 1st Baronet (1644–1728)
- Sir William Dick, 2nd Baronet (1701–1746) (born Cunningham)
- Sir Alexander Dick, 3rd Baronet (1703–1785) (born Cunningham)
- Sir William Dick, 4th Baronet (1762–1796)
- Sir Alexander Dick, 5th Baronet (1786–1808)
- Sir John Dick, 6th Baronet (1767–1812)
- Sir Robert Dick, 7th Baronet (Dick-Cunyngham from 1845) (1773–1849)

Merged in 1829 with Cunningham of Lambrughton, Ayr baronetcy as the Dick-Cunyngham baronets.

== See also ==
- Dick-Cunyngham baronets of Lambrughton (1669)
- Dick baronets of Braid (putative)
