= 1683 in Scotland =

- Centuries: 15th; 16th; 17th; 18th; 19th
- Decades: 1660s; 1670s; 1680s; 1690s; 1700s
- See also: List of years in Scotland; Timeline of Scottish history 1683 in: England • Elsewhere

Events from the year 1683 in the Kingdom of Scotland.

== Incumbents ==
- Monarch – Charles II

=== Judiciary ===
- Lord President of the Court of Session – Sir David Falconer
- Lord Justice General – James Drummond, 4th Earl of Perth
- Lord Justice Clerk – Sir Richard Maitland

== Events ==
- January – Rye House Plot to assassinate Charles II: English lawyer Aaron Smith is sent to Scotland to confer with Scottish co-conspirators. Those implicated include the exiled Archibald Campbell, 9th Earl of Argyll, Baillie of Jerviswood, John Cochrane of Ochiltree, George Melville, 1st Earl of Melville, and his son David Leslie, 3rd Earl of Leven, Sir Patrick Hume, 2nd Baronet, and Rev. Robert Ferguson. The plot is discovered on 12 June.
- 23 November – Charles II grants a charter for the colony of New Jersey to 24 proprietors, 12 of whom are Scots. The Scottish settlement is to be in East Jersey and Scots begin arriving here at Perth Amboy. The driving force among the Scots is Robert Barclay of Urie, a prominent Quaker and first Governor of East Jersey.
- A public library is first recorded at Kirkwall on Orkney.
- Newbridge Inn first built near Edinburgh.
- Ongoing – The Killing Time.

== Births ==
- 2 February – Walter Stuart, 6th Lord Blantyre, politician and landowner (died 1713)

== Deaths ==
- 10 November – Robert Morison, botanist and taxonomist (born 1620)

== See also ==
- Timeline of Scottish history
