= 1684 in Scotland =

- Centuries: 15th; 16th; 17th; 18th; 19th
- Decades: 1660s; 1670s; 1680s; 1690s; 1700s
- See also: List of years in Scotland; Timeline of Scottish history 1684 in: England • Elsewhere

Events from the year 1684 in the Kingdom of Scotland.

== Incumbents ==
- Monarch – Charles II

=== Judiciary ===
- Lord President of the Court of Session – Sir David Falconer
- Lord Justice General – James Drummond, 4th Earl of Perth, George Livingston, 3rd Earl of Linlithgow, from 10 July
- Lord Justice Clerk – Sir Richard Maitland, Sir James Foulis, 2nd Baronet, from 22 February

== Events ==
- 25 June – Death of Robert Leighton, Archbishop of Glasgow, gives rise to establishment of the Leighton Library at Dunblane, the oldest surviving public subscription (lending) library in Scotland.
- 3 November – In the Peerage of Scotland
  - The Marquess of Huntly is elevated to the title George Gordon, 1st Duke of Gordon.
  - The Marquess of Queensberry is elevated to the title William Douglas, 1st Duke of Queensberry.
- 24 December – The Killing Time: Covenanter Robert Baillie of Jerviswood is hanged for treason at the Mercat Cross in Edinburgh, having been implicated as a conspirator in the Rye House Plot of 1683 to kill the king.
- George Gordon, 1st Earl of Aberdeen, is dismissed as Lord Chancellor of Scotland and succeeded by James Drummond, 4th Earl of Perth.

== Births ==
- 6 May – John Murray, Marquess of Tullibardine, soldier (killed in action 1709 at Battle of Malplaquet)
- Alexander Dunlop, Professor of Greek in the University of Glasgow (died 1747)
- Alexander Smith, Roman Catholic bishop, Vicar Apostolic of the Lowland District (died 1766)
- Probable date – Patrick Campbell, lieutenant-general, politician and courtier (died 1751)

== Deaths ==
- 25 June – Robert Leighton, Archbishop of Glasgow and scholar (born 1611 in England)
- 20 November (bur.) – Sir John Cunningham, 1st Baronet, politician
- December – Sir Alexander Abercromby, 1st Baronet, politician (born c.1603)
- 24 December – Baillie of Jerviswood, Covenanter (born c.1634)

== See also ==
- Timeline of Scottish history
