= 1685 in Scotland =

- Centuries: 15th; 16th; 17th; 18th; 19th
- Decades: 1660s; 1670s; 1680s; 1690s; 1700s
- See also: List of years in Scotland; Timeline of Scottish history 1685 in: England • Elsewhere

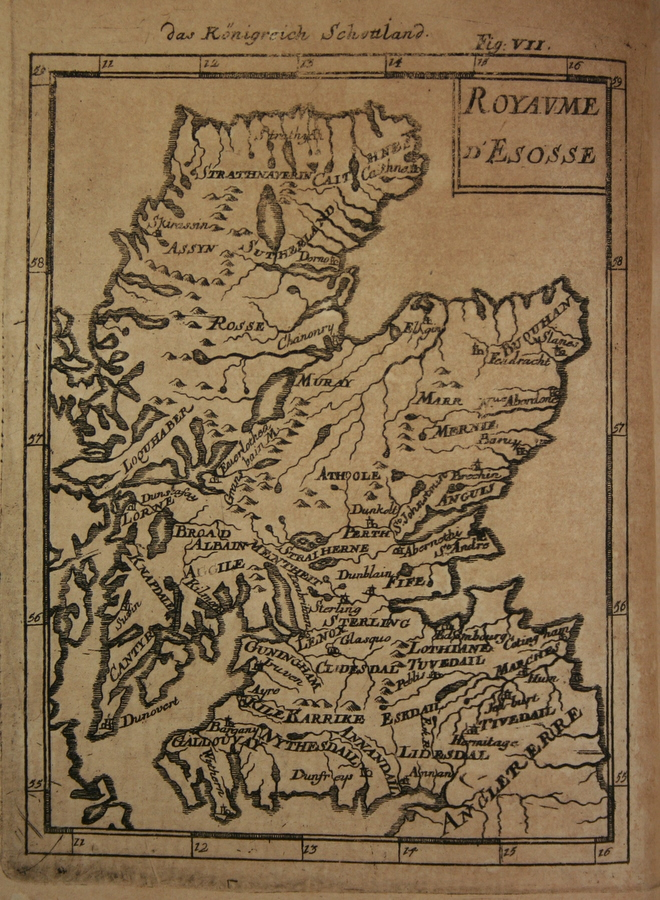
Map of Scotland, 1685.

Events from the year 1685 in the Kingdom of Scotland.

== Incumbents ==
- Monarch – Charles II (until 6 February), then James VII

=== Judiciary ===
- Lord President of the Court of Session – Sir David Falconer to 15 December; then Lord Carnwath
- Lord Justice General – George Livingston, 3rd Earl of Linlithgow
- Lord Justice Clerk – Lord Colinton

== Events ==
- 6 February – James Stuart, Duke of York becomes James II of England and Ireland and King James VII of Scotland on the death in London of his brother Charles II (1630–1685), King of England, Scotland, and Ireland since 1660. James II and VII reigns to 1688. The title of Duke of Albany merges into the crown.
- 11 May – The Killing Time: five Covenanters in Wigtown, notably Margaret Wilson, are executed for refusing to swear an oath declaring King James of England, Scotland and Ireland as head of the church, becoming the 'Wigtown martyrs'.
- 17 May – Argyll's Rising, an attempt to topple King James II led by the Earl of Argyll, commences as rebel forces land on Islay.

== Births ==
- 18 March – Ralph Erskine, preacher (died 1752)
- 31 October – John Murray, 2nd Earl of Dunmore, soldier (died 1752)
- 10 November – Duncan Forbes, Lord Culloden, judge and politician (died 1747)
- 9 December – Robert Dundas of Arniston, the Elder, Lord President of the Court of Session 1748–53 (died 1753)

== Deaths ==
- 26 June – Richard Rumbold, political radical, executed in Edinburgh (born 1622 in England)
- 30 June – Archibald Campbell, 9th Earl of Argyll, executed in Edinburgh (born 1629)
- 4 December – John Nisbet, covenanter, executed in Edinburgh (born 1627)

== See also ==
- Timeline of Scottish history
- 1685 in England
