= 1682 in Scotland =

- Centuries: 15th; 16th; 17th; 18th; 19th
- Decades: 1660s; 1670s; 1680s; 1690s; 1700s
- See also: List of years in Scotland; Timeline of Scottish history 1682 in: England • Elsewhere

Events from the year 1682 in the Kingdom of Scotland.

== Incumbents ==
- Monarch – Charles II

=== Judiciary ===
- Lord President of the Court of Session – Sir David Falconer from 5 June
- Lord Justice General – George Gordon, 1st Earl of Aberdeen; James Drummond, 4th Earl of Perth
- Lord Justice Clerk – Sir Richard Maitland

== Events ==
- 11 February – William Douglas is elevated to the rank of Marquess of Queensberry in the Peerage of Scotland.
- Advocates Library is founded as the law library of the Faculty of Advocates in Edinburgh.
- Chair of Professor of Humanity created at the University of Glasgow.
- Probable date – Inuit seen in Orkney.
- Ongoing – The Killing Time.

== Births ==
- April – James Graham, 1st Duke of Montrose, nobleman and statesman (died 1742)
- June (in England) – Archibald Campbell, 3rd Duke of Argyll, nobleman, politician, lawyer, businessman and soldier (died 1761)
- 24 October – William Aikman, portrait painter (died 1731)
- 23 December – James Gibbs, architect (died 1754)

== Deaths ==
- 6 May (in wreck of HMS Gloucester)
  - Robert Ker, 3rd Earl of Roxburghe (born c. 1658)
  - Sir John Hope of Hopetoun
- 24 August (in England) – John Maitland, 1st Duke of Lauderdale, politician (born 1616)
- David Leslie, 1st Lord Newark, cavalry officer (born c.1600)

== See also ==
- Timeline of Scottish history
- 1682 in England
