= 1680 in Scotland =

- Centuries: 15th; 16th; 17th; 18th; 19th
- Decades: 1660s; 1670s; 1680s; 1690s; 1700s
- See also: List of years in Scotland; Timeline of Scottish history 1680 in: England • Elsewhere

Events from the year 1680 in the Kingdom of Scotland.

== Incumbents ==
- Monarch – Charles II

=== Judiciary ===
- Lord President of the Court of Session – James Dalrymple
- Lord Justice General – Sir George Mackenzie; William Douglas from 1 June
- Lord Justice Clerk – Sir Richard Maitland

== Events ==
- 22 June – Sanquhar Declaration: Radical Presbyterian Michael Cameron, in the presence of his brother, Covenanter leader Richard Cameron, reads a speech in Sanquhar's public square disavowing allegiance to the King.
- 13 July – Battle of Altimarlach near Wick, Caithness: Men of Clan Campbell led by John Campbell rout Clan Sinclair under George Sinclair of Keiss in a dispute over land rights, the last significant Scottish clan battle.
- 22 July – Battle of Airds Moss in Ayrshire: Armed Covenanters are defeated in a skirmish; their leaders Richard and Michael Cameron are killed and David Hackston taken prisoner and on 30 July executed in Edinburgh for murder.
- Innerpeffray Library, the oldest known (and surviving) public (lending) library in Scotland, is established.
- Last definitely recorded native wolf in Scotland killed by Sir Ewen Cameron in Killiecrankie.
- Ongoing – The Killing Time.

== Births ==
- 22 June – Ebenezer Erskine, Secessionist minister (died 1754)
- John Willison, evangelical Church of Scotland minister and religious writer (died 1750)

== Deaths ==
- 26 September – John Dury, Scottish-born Calvinist minister (born 1596)

== See also ==
- Timeline of Scottish history
- 1680 in England
