= 1681 in Scotland =

- Centuries: 15th; 16th; 17th; 18th; 19th
- Decades: 1660s; 1670s; 1680s; 1690s; 1700s
- See also: List of years in Scotland; Timeline of Scottish history 1681 in: England • Elsewhere

Events from the year 1681 in the Kingdom of Scotland.

== Incumbents ==
- Monarch – Charles II

=== Judiciary ===
- Lord President of the Court of Session – James Dalrymple; George Gordon from November
- Lord Justice General – William Douglas
- Lord Justice Clerk – Sir Richard Maitland

== Events ==
- James, Duke of York, the King's viceroy in Scotland, summons the Parliament of Scotland to pass the Test Act under which anyone seeking office in Scotland will have to swear an oath to the King and Protestant religion.
- January – The Priestfield home of Sir James Dick, Episcopalian Lord Provost of Edinburgh, is burned down by a group of students angry at his apparent support of the Duke of York.
- 13 August – The title of Earl of Breadalbane and Holland is created in the Peerage of Scotland for Sir John Campbell.
- Autumn – James Dalrymple publishes The Institutions of the Law of Scotland.
- 11 November – The office of Historiographer Royal is created in Scotland, the first holder being James Crawford DD.
- 25 November – Tam Dalyell of the Binns issued with a commission to enroll troops into what becomes the Royal Scots Greys.
- 29 November – The Royal College of Physicians of Edinburgh is granted a royal charter.
- The Merchant Company of Edinburgh is granted a royal charter.
- Ongoing – The Killing Time.

== Deaths ==
- 27 July – Donald Cargill, Covenanter, beheaded (b. 1619)
- James Sandilands, 2nd Lord Abercrombie (b. 1645)

== See also ==
- Timeline of Scottish history
- 1681 in England
