= 1676 in Scotland =

- Centuries: 15th; 16th; 17th; 18th; 19th
- Decades: 1650s; 1660s; 1670s; 1680s; 1690s
- See also: List of years in Scotland; Timeline of Scottish history 1676 in: England • Elsewhere

Events from the year 1676 in the Kingdom of Scotland.

== Incumbents ==
- Monarch – Charles II

=== Judiciary ===
- Lord President of the Court of Session – James Dalrymple

== Events ==
- 7 February – John Murray, 3rd Earl of Tullibardine, is created Lord Murray, Balveny and Gask, Viscount of Balquhidder and 1st Marquess of Atholl in the Peerage of Scotland.
- The Royal Company of Archers is established as a private archery club in Edinburgh.

== Births ==
- 17 March – Thomas Boston, Presbyterian church leader, theologian and philosopher (died 1732)
- 28 March (bapt.) – Thomas Aikenhead, student convicted of blasphemy (executed 1697)
- 15 June – Colen Campbell, Georgian architect (died 1729)
- 19 July – Andrew Hume, Lord Kimmerghame, judge (died 1730)
- 29 July – James Blow, printer (died 1759 in Ireland)
- William Maxwell, 5th Earl of Nithsdale, Jacobite (died 1744 in Rome)
- Henry Scott, 1st Earl of Deloraine, Major-General in the British Army (died 1730)
- Alexander Selkirk, sailor (died 1721 at sea)
- Approximate date
  - Alexander Anderson, Church of Scotland minister, Moderator of the General Assembly (died 1737)
  - Sir John Clerk, 2nd Baronet, politician, lawyer, judge, antiquarian and patron of the arts (died 1755)

== Deaths ==
- 27 November (possible date) – Thomas Mackenzie of Pluscarden, soldier

== See also ==
- Timeline of Scottish history
- 1676 in England
