= John Ayloffe =

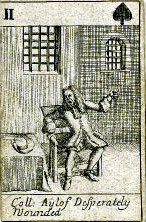
- "Col. Aylof Desperately Wounded": Ayloffe attempts suicide after his capture during Argyll's Rising, from a contemporary commemorative card
- Born: c. 1645 Foxley, Wiltshire
- Died: 30 October 1685 Fleet Street, London
- Occupation: Writer, lawyer, secret agent, conspirator, insurgent
- Genre: Satire
- Notable works: Marvell's Ghost

John Ayloffe (c. 1645 – 30 October 1685) was an English lawyer, political activist, and satirist, described as "one of the most consistently committed radicals of the century". According to his contemporary and political opponent Sir Roger L'Estrange, there were few 'more daring men for a desperate exploit'.

Throughout his career, he was a hardline opponent of the Stuart monarchy, producing a stream of satire and propaganda. His writings were characterised by their bitterly anti-French, anti-Irish, anti-Catholic tone, while the Stuarts were constantly compared to tyrants seeking to destroy English liberties.

In addition to his writings, he served William of Orange as an intelligence agent, and was a trusted supporter of Lord Shaftesbury during the 1679 to 1680 Exclusion Crisis. In 1683, he was forced into exile in the Dutch Republic due to his involvement in the 1683 Rye House Plot, an alleged attempt to assassinate Charles II and his Catholic brother James.

When James became king in 1685, he joined Argyll's Rising, a Scottish attempt to overthrow him; he was captured and executed in London on 30 October 1685.

== Early life ==
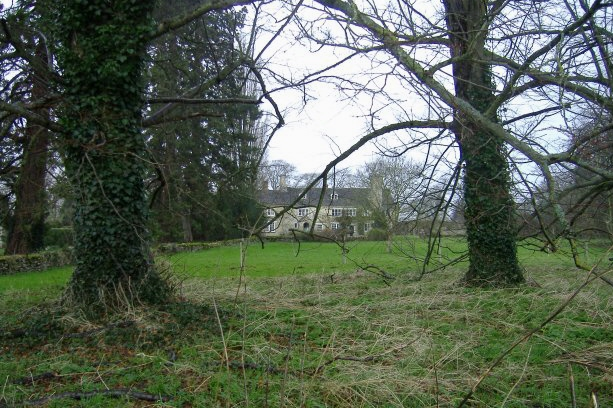
Former Foxley Manor, owned by the Ayloffe or Ayliffe family between the early 17th and early 18th century.

The spelling of his surname varies, and contemporaries often spelt it Ayliffe. He was born in Foxley in Wiltshire about 1645; his father John was a younger son of Sir George Ayloffe of Grittenham, Brinkworth, Wiltshire.

The Ayloffes owned Grittenham, Foxley and other manors in north Wiltshire for many years. Ayloffe was a nephew by marriage of Royalist leader, the Earl of Clarendon, whose first wife was a daughter of Sir George Ayloffe. Clarendon himself referred to Ayloffe's father as someone he "dearly loved". This also linked Ayloffe to the royal family through Clarendon's daughter Anne, first wife of the future James II of England.

Although he has been identified as the John Ayloffe admitted to Trinity College, Cambridge in 1666, the Oxford Dictionary of National Biography states he matriculated at St Edmund Hall, Oxford in 1662. By the 1670s, he was practising as a lawyer and his name appears regularly in the Calendar of Treasury Books, representing clients before the Lords of the Treasury. He may have been the Ayloffe who represented Thomas Skinner in the constitutionally significant 1668 Skinner's Case.

== Political activism ==
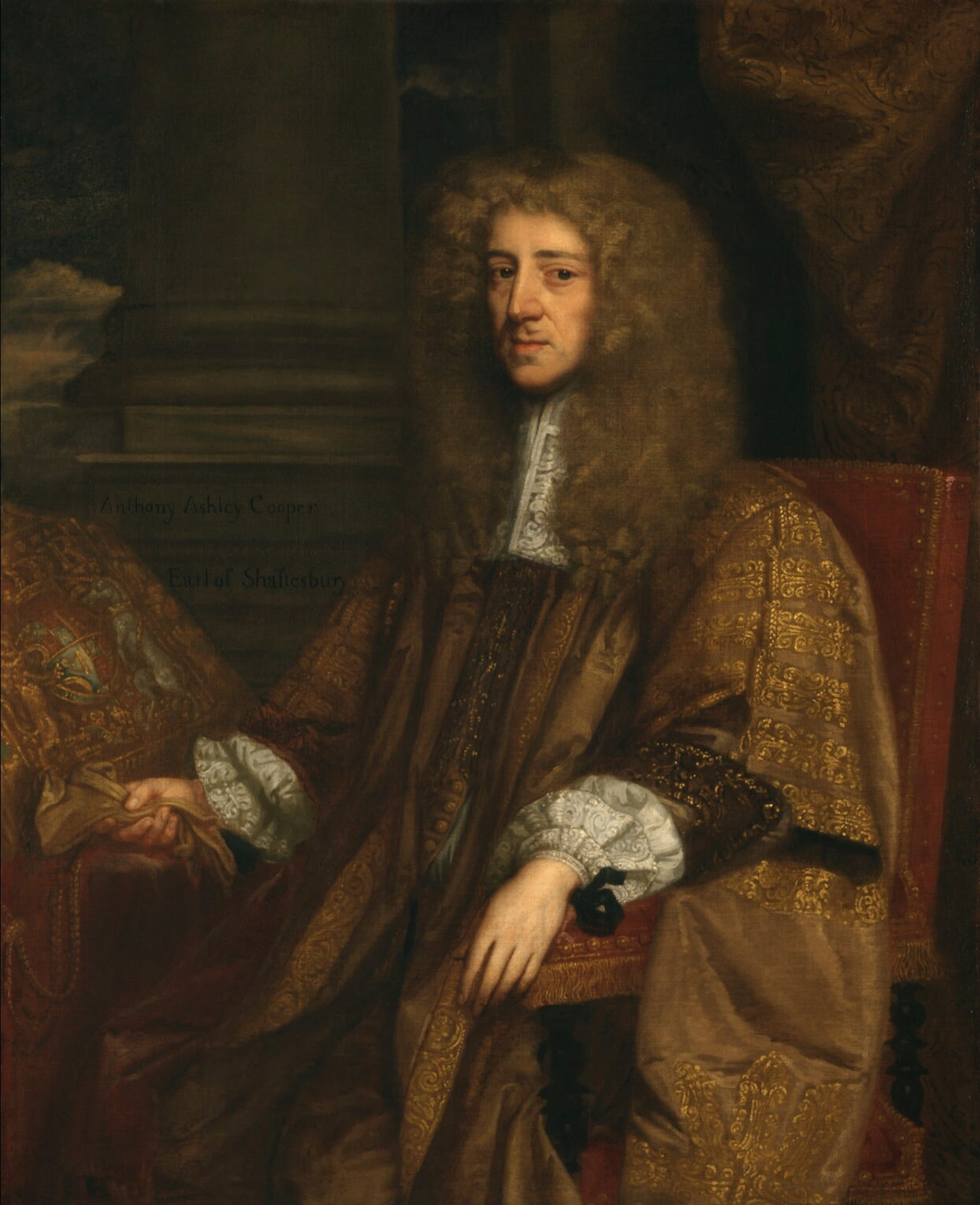
Ayloffe was a key agent for Lord Shaftesbury during the Exclusion Crisis

According to contemporaries, Ayloffe was strongly anti-Catholic, an extremist Whig and "doctrinaire republican" opposed to the Stuart monarchy. His motives are disputed; Fountainhall claimed his father spent much of his money serving Charles I during the First English Civil War, but had been given little recompense at the 1660 Restoration. This supposedly provoked Ayloffe to "draw up with the republicans".

Along with Andrew Marvell and William Carstares, Ayloffe is thought to have been part of an intelligence network led by Pierre du Moulin (d.1676), the secretary of William of Orange, which operated to oppose French and Catholic interference on English policy. At the opening of Parliament in October 1673, during the Third Anglo-Dutch War, Ayloffe threw a sabot under the Speaker's chair, supposedly a reference to French influence on the country. He was briefly detained by the doorkeepers, but released on grounds of being insane, or "distracted".

An active propagandist and versifier, Ayloffe has been identified as the author of "much of the republican doggerel of the 1670s". As part of du Moulin's group, he helped smuggle propaganda into England, including pamphlets attacking Stuart foreign policy, their government and monarchy in general. In 1678, he gave evidence in a Commons debate on the danger posed by Catholic soldiers "going into Ireland". During this, the sabot incident was used as evidence he was "mad", though Tory politician and lawyer Sir Thomas Meres argued "Mr. Ayliffe is a man of good sense, and points at what he intends".

He was closely involved in the 1679 to 1681 campaign led by Lord Shaftesbury to exclude the Catholic James from succeeding his brother Charles II. Along with other members of the radical Green Ribbon Club, he helped organise the 1680 'Great Petition' demanding the recall of Parliament. Signed by 18,000 people, others involved included Richard Rumbold, Richard Nelthorpe and Robert Ferguson, all of whom were implicated in the Rye House Plot.

Allegedly organised by Rumbold, the plan was to ambush Charles and his brother as they returned to London from Newmarket in March 1683. It was betrayed before being put into action, although there is considerable debate as to how serious it was, or what its objectives were. Along with many others, including Rumbold, Nelthorpe and Ferguson, a warrant was issued for his arrest; he escaped to the Dutch Republic, although his property was confiscated.

In 1684 he returned covertly to England to raise funds amongst Nonconformist ministers for a proposed uprising against the Stuart monarchy. This was largely a failure as few people would speak to him due to his reputation as an "atheist and a man of no conscience".

== Argyll's Rising ==
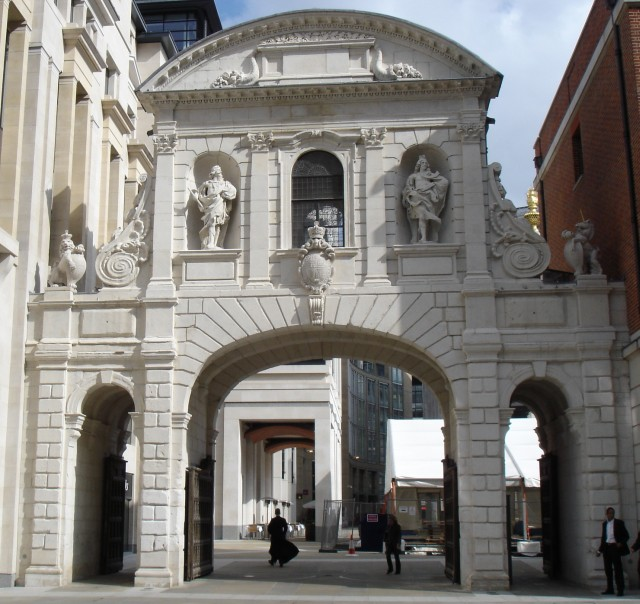
Temple Bar, where Ayloffe's head was displayed after his execution in October 1685; reassembled in Paternoster Square

The most prominent opposition leaders in Holland were Archibald Campbell, 9th Earl of Argyll, convicted of treason in 1681, and Charles' illegitimate son, James Scott, Duke of Monmouth, exiled for his involvement in the Rye House Plot. Preparations for a rising became more urgent when James became king after the death of Charles in February 1685, and the two agreed to work together. To ensure co-ordination, a leading Scots exile, Andrew Fletcher of Saltoun accompanied Monmouth, while Rumbold and Ayloffe went with Argyll.

Unfortunately, Argyll's Rising failed to attract significant support, and was fatally compromised by divisions among the rebel leadership, Ayloffe and Rumbold being among the few to emerge with any credit. After Argyll was captured on 18 June, the others were ordered to disperse and Ayloffe was soon taken. Severely beaten by his captors, he later attempted suicide by stabbing himself in the abdomen, although the wounds were not serious. He later said it was "the most base and cowardlie thing he had ever done in his life", but he was "tired of living".

While most of those associated with the Rising were tried in Scotland, including Rumbold, Ayloffe's connections meant he was well treated after his initial capture. Brought to London, he refused to co-operate with the authorities, and was executed at the junction of Fleet Street and Chancery Lane on 30 October. His remains were then displayed on Temple Bar alongside those of Richard Nelthorpe who was executed on the same day in High Holborn having been captured serving with Monmouth.

In his entry for 30 October, diarist Roger Morrice wrote "Mr. John Ayloffe died this day about 11 a Clock over-against the Temple, he was very composed and sedate". The official account of his execution, penned by L'Estrange, which depicts a repentant Ayloffe offering prayers for the King, the people and the Protestant religion, appears so completely inconsistent with all of his recorded opinions and behaviour it is likely propaganda.

A story was widely circulated amongst Whig sympathisers that prior to his death, James had interviewed Ayloffe personally. James was said to have reminded Ayloffe "you know it is in my power to pardon you, therefore say that which may deserve it", whereupon Ayloffe retorted "though it is in your power, it is not in your nature to pardon".

== Works ==
The only work definitely attributed to Ayloffe is a satiric homage to his friend Andrew Marvell. In addition, his biographer George de Forest Lord attributed to him a number of verse satires previously assigned to Marvell, based on several distinct characteristics of Ayloffe's writing. These include a bitterly anti-French, anti-Irish, and anti-Catholic tone; comparing the Stuarts with Roman tyrants, who threaten the rights of Magna Carta; a "sombre and humourless" quality; and visionary imagery. Based on this, the pamphlets Britannia and Raleigh, Oceana and Britannia and The Dream of the Cabal, amongst others, are tentatively assigned to Ayloffe.

Ayloffe has been suggested as possibly connected to "Captain Ayloffe's Letters", printed in 1701 by Abel Boyer, a Whig publisher.

== Sources ==
- Ashcraft, Richard (1986). Revolutionary Politics and Locke's Two Treatises of Government. Princeton University Press.
- Chernaik, Warren (2004). "Ayloffe [Ayliffe], John (c. 1645–1685)". Oxford Dictionary of National Biography (online ed.). Oxford University Press. doi:10.1093/ref:odnb/937. (Subscription, Wikipedia Library access or UK public library membership required.)
- Clifton, Robin (2004). "Rumbold, Richard". Oxford Dictionary of National Biography (online ed.). Oxford University Press. doi:10.1093/ref:odnb/24269. (Subscription, Wikipedia Library access or UK public library membership required.)
- Fountainhall, Lauder (1840). Historical Observes of Memorable Occurrents in Church and State, From October 1680 to April 1686 (2019 ed.). Wentworth Press. ISBN 978-0526064717.
- Greaves, Richard (1992). Secrets of the Kingdom: British Radicals from the Popish Plot to the Revolution of 1688-1689. Stanford University Press.
- Grey, Anchitell (1763). Debates of the House of Commons from the Year 1667 to the Year 1694: Volume 6. Henry, Cave, Emonson.
- Harris, Tim (1993). Politics under the later Stuarts: Party Conflict in a Divided Society 1660-1715. Longman. ISBN 978-0582040816.
- Knights, Mark (1993). "1680: London's Monster Petition". The Historical Journal. 36 (1). doi:10.1017/S0018246X00016101. JSTOR 2639515.
- Lord, Douglass (1966). "Satire and Sedition: the Life and Work of John Ayloffe". Huntington Library Quarterly. 29 (3).
- Marshall, Alan (2005). "Rye House Plotters". Oxford Dictionary of National Biography (online ed.). Oxford University Press. doi:10.1093/ref:odnb/93794. (Subscription, Wikipedia Library access or UK public library membership required.)
- Morrice, Roger (2007). Harris, Tim (ed.). The entring book of Roger Morrice, 1677-1691. Volume III, Reign of James II, 1685-1687. Boydell Press.
- Thompson, Edward Maunde (1878). The Correspondence of the Family of Hatton; Volume 1. Longman.
- Wurzbach, Natascha (1969). The Novel in Letters: Epistolary Fiction in the Early English Novel, 1678-1740. University of Miami Press. ISBN 978-0870241161.
