= Ann Smith (activist) =

17th-century political activist

Ann Smith (fl. 1682–1686) was an English anti-Catholic political activist. A devout Baptist, she and her family sheltered the rebel 9th Earl of Argyll when he was in hiding in London and fled with him to the Spanish Netherlands in 1683. She lived with her husband in Utrecht and following his death funded Argyll's Rising in Scotland and the contemporaneous Monmouth Rebellion in England. She hosted fellow conspirator Elizabeth Gaunt in Amsterdam and received a royal pardon for her activism in 1686, after which time records of her life cease.

== Early life ==
Nothing is known of Ann Smith's early life before 1682. At that time, it was recorded she was married to a prosperous sugar-baker in London and involved in the business, pursuing a debt owed by the nephew of the Spanish ambassador. Together they had at least one child.

== Political activism ==
After the Exclusion Crisis ended in 1681, King Charles II cracked down upon religious dissenters and this may have motivated Smith to take political action, since she was a devout Baptist. She was acquainted with the rebel Major Abraham Holmes and Presbyterian minister Robert Ferguson, who was known as "the Plotter" for his involvement with conspiracies such as the Rye House Plot and the Monmouth Rebellion.

Ann Smith also knew Archibald Campbell, 9th Earl of Argyll, who was to lead Argyll's Rising in 1685. This was a failed attempt to unseat the Catholic King James II of England (also James VII of Scotland), which was mainly funded by Smith. The Scottish Presbyterian and politician Argyll had been charged with treason in 1681 and was condemned to death. He escaped from Edinburgh Castle and fled to London. He met Ann Smith via Abraham Holmes and she arranged for him and his servant to be housed in secret. Firstly they lived in a tenement building close to where Smith lived in Battersea, then they moved to a more comfortable house in Brentford. Whilst in London, Argyll had covert meetings with the Anthony Ashley Cooper, 1st Earl of Shaftesbury, in the summer of 1682 to discuss rebellion and also met with the Arthur Forbes, 1st Earl of Granard, who was considering an uprising in Ireland; by the autumn Argyll was forced to flee to the Spanish Netherlands to avoid arrest.

In December 1682, Ann Smith wrote to Francis "Elephant" Smith (no relation), who was a publisher and Baptist minister. He had printed pamphlets about the Popish Plot and Shaftesbury's treasonous text Speech Lately Made by a Noble Peer, consequently being forced to flee with his family to Rotterdam. By 1683, Ann Smith and her husband had also fled to the Netherlands and they were living with Argyll in Utrecht. Together, they visited John Cochrane, another Scottish exile who was living in Cleves. Cochrane joined the conspirators.

A profile written for the English government described Ann Smith as "a great fomentor of plots". After the death of her husband in 1684, Smith inherited his wealth and she quickly gave £7,000 (equivalent to £1,400,000 in 2023) to Argyll to fund his revolt. The rising in Scotland was designed to occur at the same time as the Monmouth Rebellion in the south of England, but Argyll began with a force of just 300 men and never engaged the expected numbers of men for his cause. James Scott, 1st Duke of Monmouth was also in exile in the Netherlands, living on an annuity of £6,000 (equivalent to £1,200,000 in 2023) given to him by the Governor-general of the Netherlands, the Marquis of Savona. In January 1685, various English exiles met in Utrecht to discuss revolutionary plans and in February Monmouth met Argyll in Amsterdam, deciding upon the plan to invade England from both north and south. In addition to her financial support of Argyll, Smith gave £1,000 (equivalent to £190,000 in 2023) to Monmouth so that he could hire a ship to sail to Lyme Regis. During the uprising, Smith remained in the Netherlands; her son joined Monmouth and it is not known if he survived. Ferguson visited Smith to tell her that both uprisings had failed and Argyll wrote from prison to apologise that her name had been mentioned at his trial. By July 1685, both Argyll and Monmouth had been executed for treason.

Smith also gave shelter to Elizabeth Gaunt in Amsterdam in the spring of 1685, before Gaunt's trial in London and eventual death through being burnt alive on 23 October 1685. During the religious turmoil of the 1680s, Smith is one of around twelve women (alongside Gaunt) known to have been active in the support of revolutionary politics. She received a royal pardon in 1686 and nothing else is known about her life afterwards.
