= 1691 in Scotland =

- Centuries: 15th; 16th; 17th; 18th; 19th
- Decades: 1670s; 1680s; 1690s; 1700s; 1710s
- See also: List of years in Scotland; Timeline of Scottish history 1691 in: England • Elsewhere

Events from the year 1691 in the Kingdom of Scotland.

== Incumbents ==
- Monarch – William II and Mary II
- Secretary of State – John Dalrymple, Master of Stair

=== Law officers ===
- Lord Advocate – John Dalrymple
- Solicitor General for Scotland – ??

=== Judiciary ===
- Lord President of the Court of Session – Lord Stair
- Lord Justice General – Lord Lothian
- Lord Justice Clerk – Lord Cessnock

== Events ==
- 27 August – King William offers the Highland clans a pardon for their part in the Jacobite rising if they agree to pledge allegiance to him before New Year's Day.

== Births ==
- 30 April – Henry Ingram, 7th Viscount of Irvine landowner and politician (died 1761)
- date unknown –
  - Thomas Cochrane, 8th Earl of Dundonald, nobleman, army officer and politician (died 1778)
  - William M'Culloch, minister (died 1771)
  - Philip Miller, botanist (died 1771)

== Deaths ==
- 21 October – Alexander Seton, 1st Viscount of Kingston, cavalier (born 1620)
- date unknown –
  - Charles Maitland, 3rd Earl of Lauderdale, peer and statesman (born 1620)

== See also ==
- Timeline of Scottish history
