= 1679 in Scotland =

- Centuries: 15th; 16th; 17th; 18th; 19th
- Decades: 1650s; 1660s; 1670s; 1680s; 1690s
- See also: List of years in Scotland; Timeline of Scottish history 1679 in: England • Elsewhere

Events from the year 1679 in the Kingdom of Scotland.

== Incumbents ==
- Monarch – Charles II

=== Judiciary ===
- Lord President of the Court of Session – James Dalrymple
- Lord Justice General – Sir George Mackenzie
- Lord Justice Clerk – Sir Thomas Wallace of Craigie, Lord Craigie

== Events ==
- 3 May – James Sharp, the Church of Scotland Archbishop of St Andrews, is assassinated at Magus Muir in Fife when his coach is ambushed by a group of nine Covenanters; only two of the assassins, David Hackston and Andrew Guillan, are captured.
- 1 June – Battle of Drumclog: A group of 200 Covenanters overwhelm a small Scottish Army unit that has been pursuing them for the murder of Archbishop Sharp. The Covenanters, led by 19-year-old William Cleland, kill 36 of the Scottish soldiers.
- 22 June – Battle of Bothwell Bridge: Royal forces led by the Duke of Monmouth (the King's illegitimate son) and John Graham of Claverhouse subdue the Covenanters. Cleland goes into exile.
- 10 December – More than 200 captives on the ship The Crown of London, all Scottish Covenanters arrested after the battle of Bothwell Bridge, are killed when the ship is wrecked on the Orkney Islands while transporting the group to exile in North America.

== Births ==
- James Erskine, Lord Grange, judge (died 1754)

== Deaths ==
- 22 June – William Gordon of Earlston, landowner and Covenanter, shot at Battle of Bothwell Bridge (born 1614)
- 27 November – Archibald Primrose, Lord Carrington, judge (born 1616)

== See also ==
- Timeline of Scottish history
- 1679 in England
