= James Kirkton =

James Kirkton (1628–1699) was a Church of Scotland minister and author.

He is best known as author of The Secret and True History of the Church of Scotland, which despite being over 300 years old, remains in print.

== Life ==
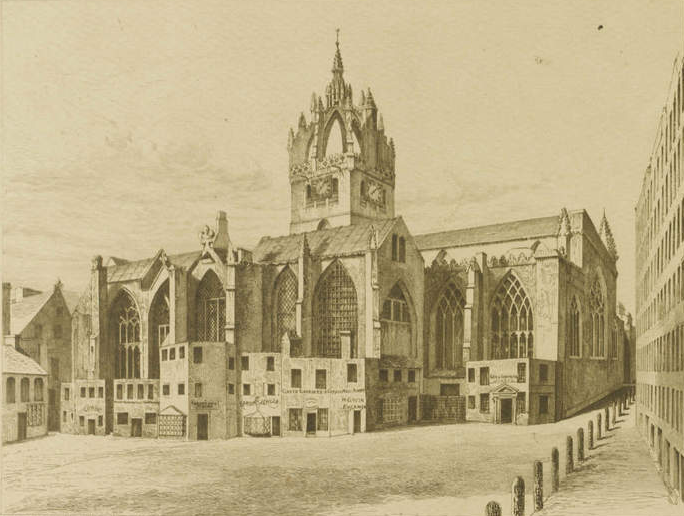
St Giles' from the south c. 1700

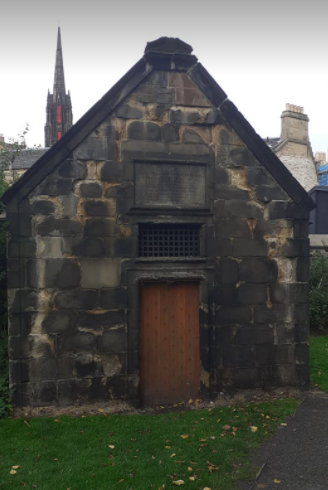
The Trotter vault, Greyfriars Kirkyard

He was born in 1628. He studied at Edinburgh University graduating MA in 1647. He was a bursar of the Presbytery of Jedburgh and was first ordained as "second charge" minister of Lanark in 1655 translating to Mertoun in the Scottish Borders in 1657.

He was deprived of office in 1662 for differences with the new political and religious climate (primarily the reintroduction of Episcopacy) and sought refuge first in England. He was in Edinburgh in June 1676 when he was seized as a rebel by Captain Carstairs, but his release was negotiated by his brother-in-law, Robert Baillie of Jerviswood, who had great influence. He afterwards took refuge in Holland.

He returned to Scotland in July 1687 after the "Toleration" and preached from a meeting house on Castlehill, at the head of the Royal Mile in Edinburgh.

In 1691 he succeeded William Gardyne as minister of Tolbooth Parish, one of the four parishes contained within St Giles Cathedral, a very prestigious charge. During his ministry in Edinburgh he is noted for criticising cockernonnies - a hairstyle fashionable with women in the late 17th century, and was affronted when he saw his own daughter in church sporting this "cock-up": "I have spent all this year preaching against the vanity of women, yet I see my own daughter in the kirk even now, with as high a 'cock-up' as any of you all."

He died on 17 September 1699. He was buried in the Trotter vault at the north end of Greyfriars Kirkyard.

Not until 1706 was a replacement minister found for Tolbooth parish: Rev John Mathison.

== Family ==
On New Year's Eve 1657/8 he married Elizabeth (Grissel) Bailie (d.1697) daughter of George Bailie of Jerviswood and sister of Robert Baillie of Jerviswood. Their children included:

- George Kirkton MD an Edinburgh physician
- Dr Andrew Kirkton (d.1694)
- Captain James Kirkton RN
- William Kirkton, drowned in the Water of Leith in 1676
- Elizabeth died 1673
- Rachel died 1700

His wife and most of his children predeceased him and all are buried at Greyfriars near the Trotter monument.

== Publications ==
- Secret and True History of the Church of Scotland (c.1690)
- Life of Mr John Welch, Minister of the Gospel at Ayr (1703)
