= Newbridge, Edinburgh =

Village near Edinburgh Airport, Scotland

Coordinates: 55°56′21.80″N 3°24′28.97″W

Newbridge: Scottish Gaelic: An Drochaid Nuadh; Scots: Newbrig
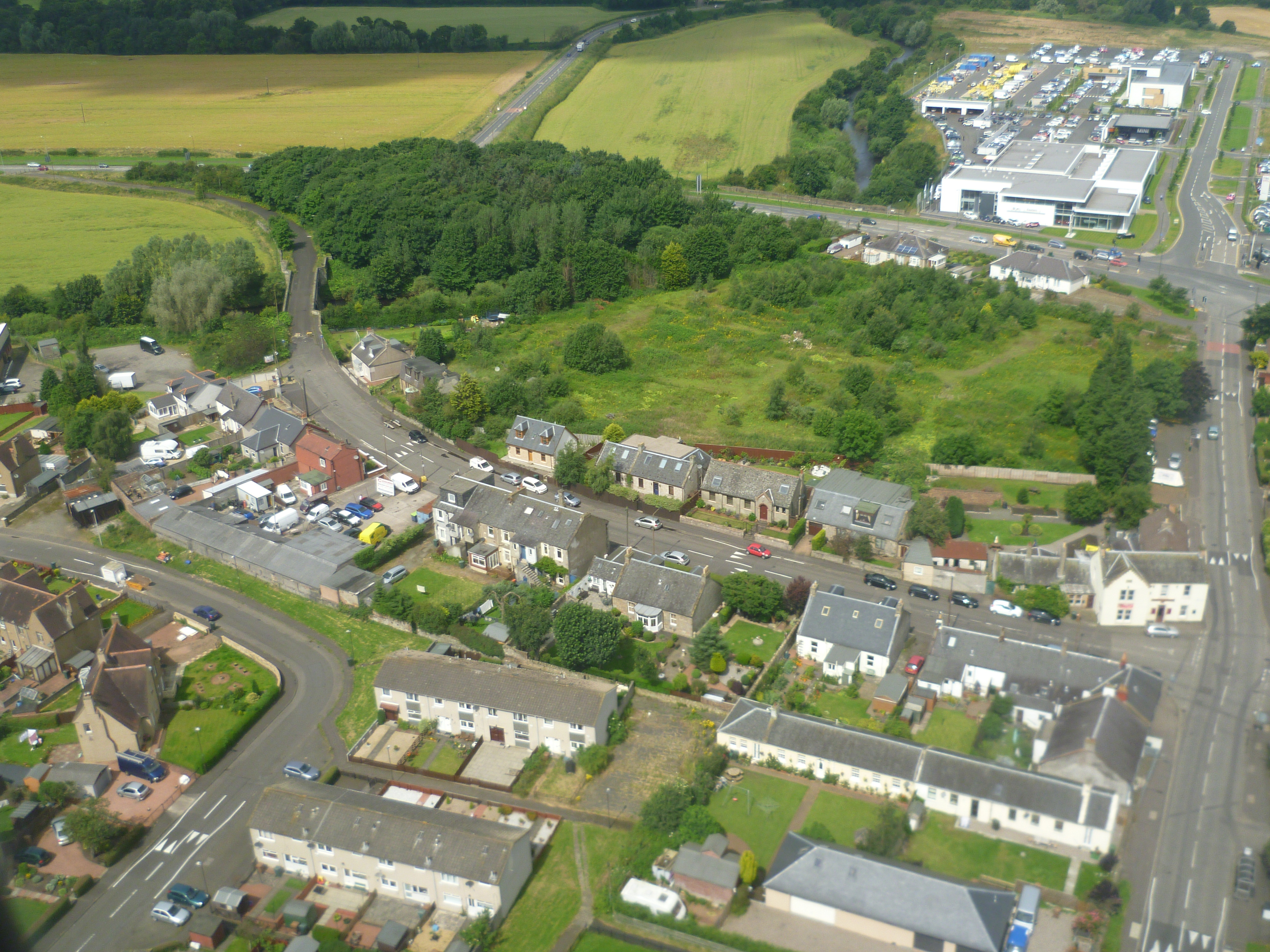
- Newbridge from the air

- Location within Edinburgh
- Population: 1,270 (2020)
- Community council: Ratho and District
- Council area: Edinburgh
- Lieutenancy area: Edinburgh
- Country: Scotland
- Sovereign state: United Kingdom
- Post town: NEWBRIDGE
- Postcode district: EH28 8
- Dialling code: 0131
- Police: Scotland
- Fire: Scottish
- Ambulance: Scottish
- UK Parliament: Edinburgh West
- Scottish Parliament: Edinburgh North Western

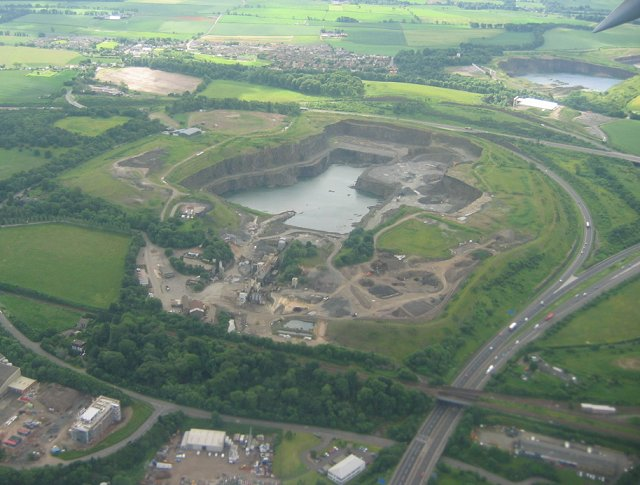
The flooded workings of Hillwood Quarry, south of Newbridge, dolerite was extracted here

Newbridge is a village in the civil parish of Kirkliston, west of Edinburgh in Scotland. It formerly belonged to Midlothian, but it has been on the western fringe of to the City of Edinburgh since 1975. The original village consists of a small crossroads settlement to the east of the eponymous New Bridge, which spans the River Almond. Around it is a confusion of roads and industrial estates converging on the Newbridge Roundabout, the meeting point of the M8 and M9 motorways.

Newbridge (including Ratho Station) had a total population of 1,074 at the 2011 Census based on the 2010 definition of the locality.

== Archaeology ==
Excavations in advance of a phased commercial development in 2007 and 2014 by AOC Archaeology revealed human activity in Newbridge from the Mesolithic to the medieval period. Radiocarbon dating put the earliest human activity in the area at 6640–6230 BC. There was a scatter of domestic settlement in the Middle Bronze Age (radio carbon dates of 1700-1200 BC) and pre-Roman Iron Age. They also believe there may be the remnants of a barrow cemetery. The archaeologists also identified a section of Dere Street, a Roman road. Finally, there was evidence that the area was farmed in the 11th to 12th centuries and in the 13th to 14th centuries AD, a pattern reflected in other medieval settlement in the Lothians.

=== Newbridge Chariot ===
The remains of an Iron Age chariot burial were found near the Bronze Age burial mound at Huly Hill, Newbridge, in advance of development at the Edinburgh Interchange. The chariot was the first of its kind to be found in Scotland.

== Local amenities ==
Newbridge has an industrial estate, multiple car dealerships, a Royal Bank of Scotland branch, a pub with a large beer garden (the Newbridge Inn, founded in 1683), a bowling club, a McDonald's restaurant, a petrol station, a Premier Inn (with Thyme restaurant), a cafe and a fish and chip shop. There is a Scotmid nearby at Ratho Station. Larger supermarkets can be found in Broxburn. A doctor's surgery and a chemist are located in Ratho.

== Transport ==
=== Road ===
The Newbridge roundabout was built in 1970 as a flat roundabout serving the M8 Edinburgh to Glasgow motorway, the M9 Edinburgh to Stirling motorway, the A8 and the A89. One of the busiest roundabouts in Scotland, traffic congestion became intolerable and it was converted to a grade-separated roundabout interchange in 1997, becoming Junction 1 of the M9. The A8 (dual carriageway to Maybury junction only) runs from the Newbridge Roundabout into Edinburgh City Centre. The A89 road runs from Newbridge roundabout to Broxburn.

=== Bus ===
Newbridge is served by several bus services.

=== McGill's Scotland East ===
- X38 (Falkirk - Linlithgow - Kirkliston - Edinburgh)

=== Lothian Country Buses ===
- 70 (Hermiston P&R - Ratho - Ratho Station - Gyle Centre)
- 71 (Queensferry - Kirkliston - Newbridge - Gyle Centre)
- X18 (Whitburn - Armadale - Bathgate - Dechmomt - Broxburn - Edinburgh)
- X19 (Winchburgh - Kirkliston - Newbridge - Ratho Station - Edinburgh)
- N18 (Edinburgh - Broxburn - Dechmont - Bathgate)(Weekend Night Service)

"Lothian Country". www.lothianbuses.com.

=== Stagecoach South Scotland ===
- X51 (Dunfermline Bus Station, Forth Road Bridge, Queensferry, Kirkliston, Livingston)

=== Air ===
Newbridge is about a mile from Edinburgh Airport's Terminal Building.

=== Tram ===
Newbridge was supposed to be the western terminus of Tram Line 2.

== Schools ==
Newbridge shares Hillwood Primary School with Ratho Station. Newbridge is in the catchment area for Craigmount High School.
