= 1689 in Scotland =

- Centuries: 15th; 16th; 17th; 18th; 19th
- Decades: 1660s; 1670s; 1680s; 1690s; 1700s
- See also: List of years in Scotland; Timeline of Scottish history 1689 in: England • Elsewhere

Events from 1689 in the Kingdom of Scotland

== Incumbents ==
- Monarch – William II and Mary II (from 11 May)
- Secretary of State – John Drummond, 1st Earl of Melfort, then from 13 May George Melville, 1st Earl of Melville

== Events ==
- 16 March–5 June – Convention of the Estates of Scotland sits to determine the settlement of the Scottish throne following the invasion of the Kingdom of England by William, Prince of Orange in 1688
- 18 March – King's Own Scottish Borderers is raised to defend Edinburgh against Jacobite forces
- 4 April – Convention of Estates votes to remove James VII from office for forfeiture; going on to adopt the Claim of Right Act 1689
- 20 April – Robert Lundy secretly flees Derry for Scotland.
- 11 May – William and Mary accept the Convention's offer of the crown on the day they are crowned King and Queen of England and Scotland at Westminster Abbey
- 16 May – Battle of Loup Hill on Kintyre between Jacobite forces commanded by Donald MacNeill of Gallchoille and government forces commanded by Captain William Young
- c. 5 June – Lords of the Articles abolished
- 22 July – the Parliament of Scotland votes to abolish episcopacy
- 27 July – Battle of Killiecrankie: Covenanter supporters of William and Mary (under Hugh Mackay) are defeated by the Jacobites though the latter's leader, John Graham, Viscount Dundee, is killed
- 21 August – Battle of Dunkeld: the Orange Covenanter Cameronian Guard defeat the Jacobite clans in street fighting though the Cameronian Colonel William Cleland is killed

== Births ==
- 7 January – Robert Murray, soldier and Member of Parliament (died 1738)
- 14 April – William Murray, Marquess of Tullibardine, soldier and Jacobite leader (died 1746 in the Tower of London)
- October – William Adam, architect, mason and entrepreneur (died 1748)

== Deaths ==
- 31 March – George Lockhart, advocate and Member of Parliament (born 1630)
- 27 July – John Graham, 1st Viscount Dundee, nobleman and soldier, killed at the Battle of Killiecrankie (born 1648)
- 21 August – William Cleland, poet and soldier, killed at the Battle of Dunkeld (born 1661)

== See also ==
- Timeline of Scottish history
