= 1690 in Scotland =

- Centuries: 15th; 16th; 17th; 18th; 19th
- Decades: 1670s; 1680s; 1690s; 1700s; 1710s
- See also: List of years in Scotland; Timeline of Scottish history 1690 in: England • Elsewhere

Events from the year 1690 in the Kingdom of Scotland.

== Incumbents ==
- Monarch – William II and Mary II
- Secretary of State – Lord Melville

=== Law officers ===
- Lord Advocate – John Dalrymple
- Solicitor General for Scotland – ??

=== Judiciary ===
- Lord President of the Court of Session – Lord Stair
- Lord Justice General – Lord Lothian
- Lord Justice Clerk – Lord Stair, then Lord Cessnock

== Events ==
- 4 January – Glasgow is re-chartered as a royal burgh with power to elect its own officials
- 25 April – the Parliament of Scotland passes an Act to abolish episcopy in the presbyterian Church of Scotland. The Anglican Episcopal Church in Scotland continues as a separate denomination, retaining bishops. The Reformed Presbyterian Church of Scotland also forms
- 30 April–1 May – defeat at the Battle of Cromdale effectively ends the Jacobite uprising
- 9 October – Royal Navy frigate HMS Dartmouth is wrecked in the Sound of Mull while on a mission to persuade the MacLeans of Duart to sign articles of allegiance to William III and Mary II
- Rev. Robert Kirk produces An Biobla Naomhtha, a pocket Bible translation into Scottish Gaelic (in Roman characters) adapted from William Bedell's Classical Gaelic translation of the Old Testament and William Daniel's of the New Testament, published in London
- Hearth Tax abolished
- The whisky distillery at Ferintosh, Black Isle, becomes the first to operate legally

== Births ==
- April – William McGibbon, composer and violinist (died 1756)
- 26 September – James Murray, 2nd Duke of Atholl, peer and politician (died 1764)
- Undated – William Drummond, 4th Viscount Strathallan, Jacobite army officer (died 1746)

== Deaths ==
- 3 October – Robert Barclay, Quaker and writer (born 1648)

== See also ==
- Timeline of Scottish history
