= 1688 in Scotland =

- Centuries: 15th; 16th; 17th; 18th; 19th
- Decades: 1660s; 1670s; 1680s; 1690s; 1700s
- See also: List of years in Scotland; Timeline of Scottish history 1688 in: England • Wales • Elsewhere

Events from 1688 in the Kingdom of Scotland.

== Incumbents ==
- Monarch – James VII (until 11 December)
- Secretary of State – John Drummond, 1st Earl of Melfort

== Events ==
- August – Battle of Maol Ruadh fought between the Chattan Confederation led by the Clan Mackintosh against the Clan MacDonald of Keppoch and the Clan Cameron.
- Construction on the Kirk of the Canongate in Edinburgh begins.

== Births ==
- April – John Boyle, 2nd Earl of Glasgow, nobleman (died 1740)

== Deaths ==
- 19 January – Sir James Foulis, 2nd Baronet
- 17 February – James Renwick, minister and the last of the Covenanter martyrs.

== See also ==
- Timeline of Scottish history
