= 1686 in Scotland =

- Centuries: 15th; 16th; 17th; 18th; 19th
- Decades: 1660s; 1670s; 1680s; 1690s; 1700s
- See also: List of years in Scotland; Timeline of Scottish history 1686 in: England • Elsewhere

Events from 1686 in the Kingdom of Scotland.

== Incumbents ==
- Monarch – James VII
- Secretary of State – John Drummond, 1st Earl of Melfort

== Events ==
- Construction of the following buildings in Lothian:
  - Newhailes House
  - Signal Tower (as windmill), Leith
  - Woolmet House
  - Soutra Aisle (modified).

== Births ==
- 15 October – Allan Ramsay, poet (died 1758)
- 1 November – Colin Campbell, merchant and entrepreneur, co-founder of the Swedish East India Company (died 1757)
- John Alexander, painter (died c. 1766).

== Deaths ==
- 11 November – Colin Falconer, bishop (born 1623).

== See also ==
- Timeline of Scottish history
