= Argyll's Rising =

1685 rebellion in Scotland

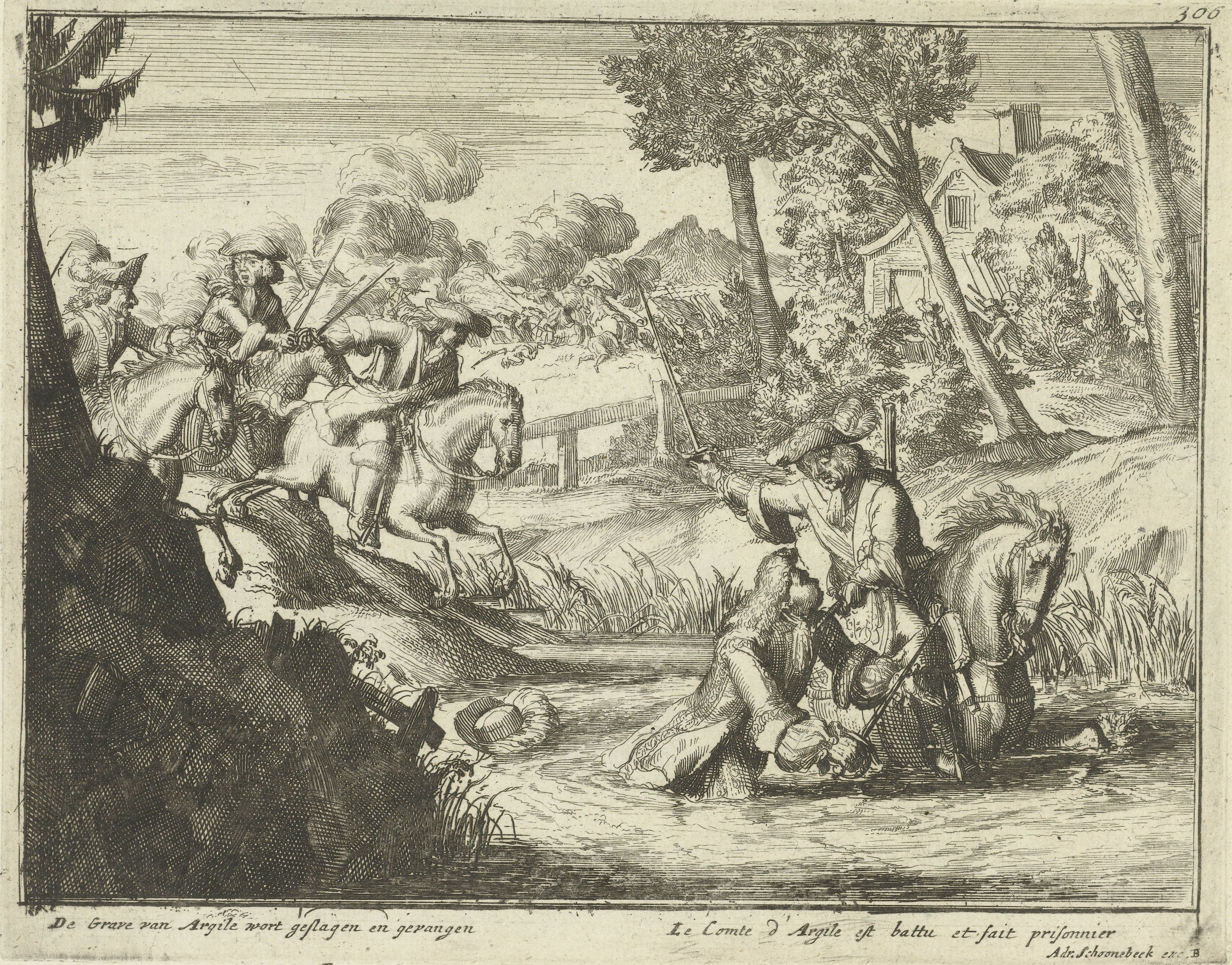
- An illustration of Argyll's capture
Date	May – June 1685
Location	Scotland
Result	Government victory

Belligerents
Government of Scotland	Covenanter rebels

Commanders and leaders
John Murray; George Douglas	Archibald Campbell (executed); Patrick Hume; John Cochrane (POW); Duncan Campbell; Richard Rumbold (executed); John Ayloffe (executed)

Strength
c. 10,000	900–2,500 (Note: Willcock reports the maximum strength of the rebels in late May was 2,500 but was depleted by desertion to around 900 by 17 June.)

Casualties and losses
Minimal	Unknown killed and wounded 323+ captured

Argyll's Rising, (Note: Also known as Argyll's Rebellion) June 1685, was an attempt to overthrow James II and VII in Scotland led by Archibald Campbell, 9th Earl of Argyll. Planned to coincide with the Monmouth Rebellion in England, both were backed by Protestants who opposed James due to his Catholicism.

Argyll expected to raise several thousand men from Clan Campbell, as well as additional support from Presbyterian dissidents. He landed in Scotland with around 300 men, but attracted few recruits. Hampered by disagreements amongst their leaders, the rebels began to disperse in mid June, while Argyll was captured and executed on 30 June.

== Background ==
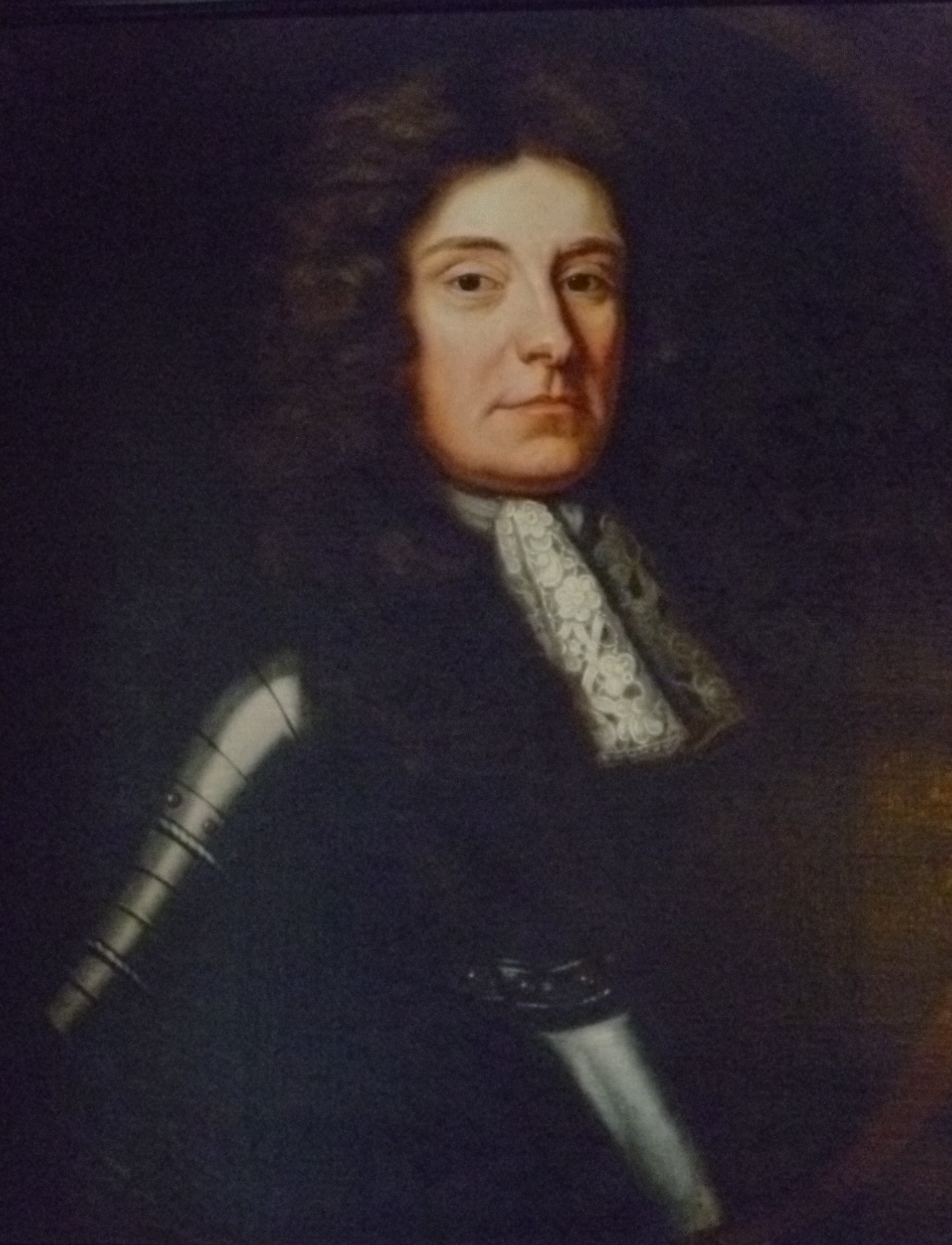
Archibald Campbell, 9th Earl of Argyll; convicted of treason in 1681, he escaped to the Dutch Republic in 1683

Despite widespread opposition to Catholicism in the predominantly Protestant kingdoms of Scotland and England, in February 1685 James II and VII came to power with widespread support, despite being a Catholic himself. This was driven by a desire for stability, especially as James had yet to produce a legitimate son, and the legal heir was his Protestant daughter Mary.

As a result, most members of the Church of Scotland argued there was no justification for taking up arms. Nevertheless, a significant minority had been expelled from the church under the Rescissory Act 1661, primarily in Southwest Scotland, an area dominated by the Duke of Argyll. These dissidents held religious services in the open fields, known as conventicles, which often attracted thousands of worshippers.

Despite his father's role in the Covenanter government of 1638 to 1651, Archibald Campbell, 9th Earl of Argyll became a leading figure in Charles II's Scottish administration. However, by the 1670s his power in the West Highlands was seen as a threat to royal authority, as well as royal income. In 1679, a failed conventicle rebellion left him vulnerable to attack by Lord Advocate Rosehaugh, chief prosecutor of the 1679 rebels. As a result, his objections to the 1681 Test Act, (Note: The Act was poorly written, and seemed to require office holders to confirm both Jesus and the reigning monarch were head of the kirk.) he was convicted of treason and sentenced to death, a charge widely regarded as driven by James's vindictiveness.

Charles allowed Argyll to escape, and he eventually reached the Dutch Republic after being accused of complicity in the 1683 Rye House Plot. Here he joined a group of English and Scottish political exiles, who were protected by James' daughter Mary and her husband William of Orange. They included Whigs opposed to James's succession, supporters of Charles's illegitimate Protestant son Monmouth, and republican radicals. Among the most prominent were the moderate Whig Lord Melville, Sir Patrick Hume, who defended many of the 1679 rebels, Sir John Cochrane of Ochiltree, and former Cromwellian soldier Richard Rumbold, a leading member of the Rye House Plot.

== Planning ==
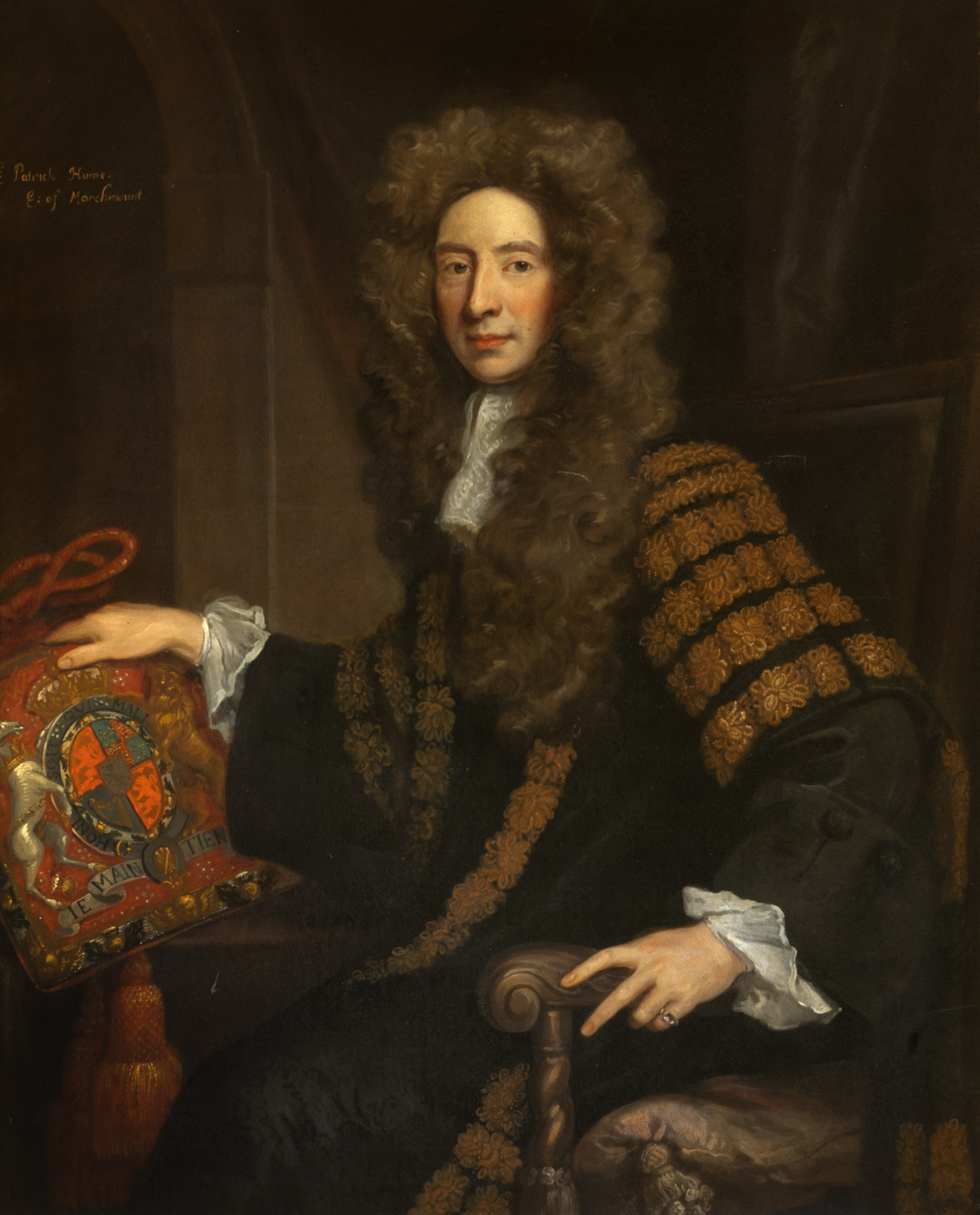
Sir Patrick Hume, a key member of the rebels' Council. His disagreements with Argyll hampered the progress of the rebellion.

Argyll began planning an insurrection in Scotland in early 1684, initially aimed at regaining his lands and titles. Although he sought funding of £30,000, he was only able to raise £10,000, most of it supplied by English sympathisers, including Ann Smith, Patience Ward, William Rumbold and John Locke. This was used to purchase military equipment in Amsterdam, concealed as destined for the Venetian Republic; these precautions proved of little value, since the Scottish government were kept informed of the plot from its beginning.

Preparations became more urgent following the death of Charles II in February 1685, and the accession of James. It made sense to co-ordinate with Monmouth, but Argyll was deeply suspicious of his fellow exile, and had to be persuaded to meet him by Hume and Robert Ferguson. In early March 1685, Monmouth came to Amsterdam; they agreed he would take responsibility for England, the south of Ireland, and foreign relations, while Argyll would deal with Scotland and northern Ireland. To ensure co-ordination between the two, a leading Scots exile, Andrew Fletcher of Saltoun, agreed to accompany Monmouth, while the English rebels Rumbold and John Ayloffe went with Argyll.

Most significantly, Monmouth undertook not to declare himself king unless proposed by Parliament, and to depart no more than six days after Argyll. The Scottish landing was intended to be a diversion, the main thrust being Monmouth's invasion of England, but in the event, he did not sail until nearly a month later. This allowed James to focus on Argyll, while a militia force under the Marquess of Atholl was ordered to occupy his proposed recruiting area of Argyllshire. Cochrane chaired a further meeting in April attended by Argyll and his third son Charles. While it was agreed Argyll should lead the expedition, he was forced to accept a Council that would approve all major decisions.

== Voyage to Scotland ==
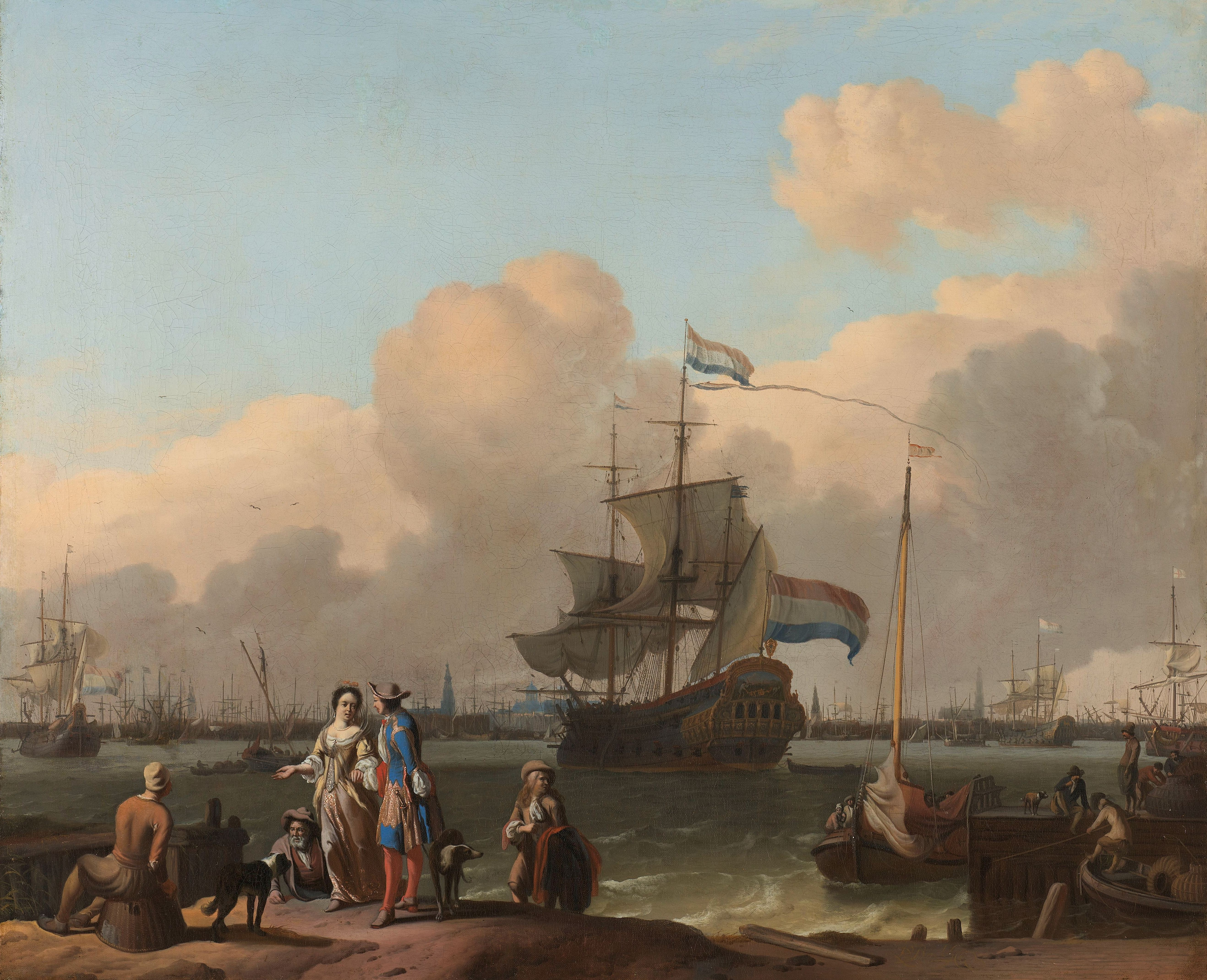
The port of Amsterdam, c.1680; the rebels sailed from here on 2 May 1685

Weapons to equip 20,000 men were loaded on three ships, Anna, David and Sophia, along with around 300 men, mainly Scots serving in the Dutch military. After waiting several days in the Zuider Zee for a favourable wind, Argyll's forces eventually left Amsterdam at about 7 o'clock in the evening on 2 May. Blown by a gale, they arrived off the Moray Firth early on the morning of 5 May, intending to reach the western coast by passing north of Orkney. However the wind died away, a sea fog descended, and the vessels missed the passage between Orkney and Shetland. They anchored in Swanbister Bay on Orkney's south coast and Argyll's chamberlain William Spence, who had an uncle living in Kirkwall, got permission from Argyll to go ashore to obtain a pilot.

Disaster struck when Spence and his companion Dr. Blackader were arrested in Kirkwall, alerting the authorities to the rebels' presence; Hume proposed rescuing their colleagues, while Argyll and Cochrane suggested taking hostages. After this was eventually agreed, a landing party took 7 local gentry prisoner; Argyll wrote to the Bishop of Orkney proposing an exchange, but received no response. The rebels and their hostages continued west, reaching the Sound of Mull by the evening of 11 May. On arriving at the Isle of Mull, Charles Campbell was sent ashore to Lorne, where he attempted to raise local heritors who held their land from his father. In the interim, the main invasion force sailed southwards to Islay; Argyll decided to land the majority of his troops by night and surprise Atholl's militia, disembarking at one o'clock in the morning of the 17th.

== The rising begins ==
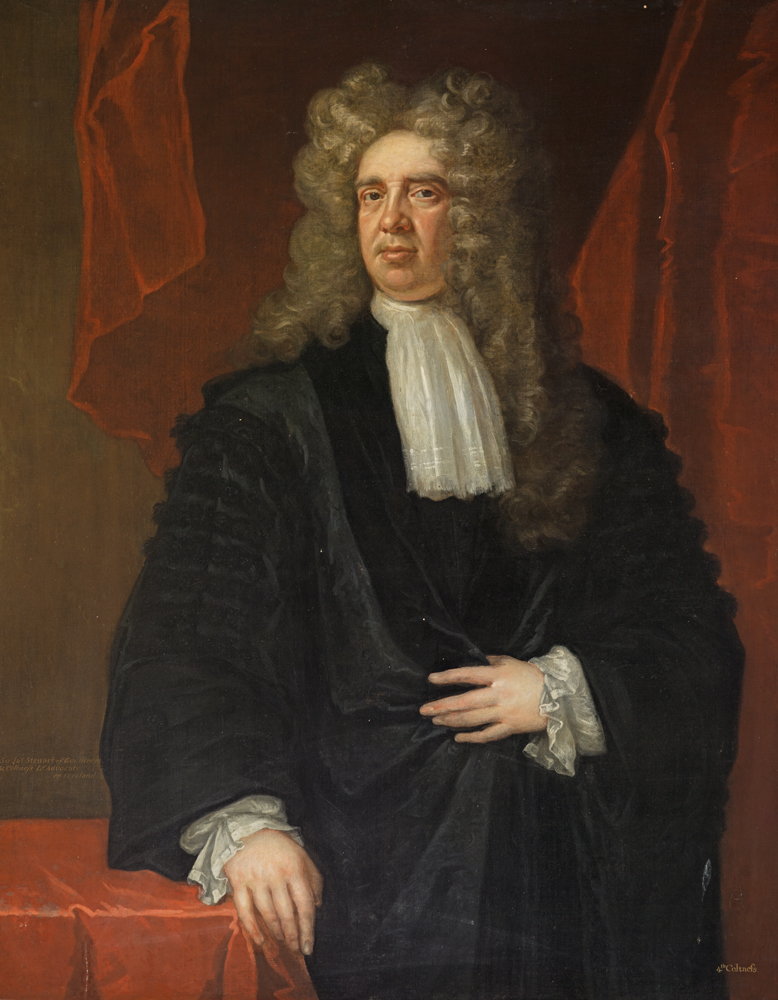
James Stewart of Goodtrees, author of the rebel Declaration, a "windy, wordy" document

Atholl's men escaped to Kintyre some three hours earlier and the rebels landed at Kilarrow unopposed. Although the well-equipped rebel soldiers made a good impression, Argyll only secured 80 local recruits rather than the 600 he had expected. On 20 May the fleet crossed over to Kintyre and landed at Campbeltown, centre of Argyll's regional influence; here he had two manifestos read out, the first claiming he wanted only to retrieve his estates.

Drawn up by James Stewart of Goodtrees, the second Declaration was a lengthy recital of grievances that failed to specify an alternative. This reflected the dilemma faced by the rebel leadership; the Presbyterian dissidents, or Cameronians, who were their most likely recruits wanted to overthrow the kirk establishment, thereby guaranteeing opposition from the moderate majority. The Cameronians were already deeply suspicious of Argyll, who had been part of the administration that persecuted them in the 1670s, and since the Declaration omitted any mention of the 1638 Covenant, they withheld their support.

Argyll mustered his forces in Kintyre on 22 May. Three understrength companies of recruits had followed from Islay; more were formed using new volunteers from Kintyre, who were issued with Dutch weapons, and given colours written with the mottoes "For the Protestant Religion" and "Against Popery, Prelacy and Erastianism". Rumbold and Ayloffe were both given colonelcies of regiments, of horse and foot respectively, formed from recruits enlisted in Campbeltown.

=== Divisions amongst the leadership ===
Argyll and Bute 1685; key locations

The original plan was for a quick descent on the Lowlands to mobilise Covenanter support before government troops could prevent it. The idea seemed validated when George Barclay arrived from the Presbyterian heartland of Ayrshire, claiming to have hundreds of potential recruits, while some of the men recruited on Islay had already deserted. Argyll ordered his forces to Tarbert, Kintyre, to link up with Campbell clan levies, where on 27 May they were joined by 1,200 men under his son Charles and Sir Duncan Campbell of Auchinbreck, bringing their total strength to around 2,500. The rebel infantry were organised into three regiments, with Ayloffe, Campbell of Auchinbreck and Robert Elphinstone of Lapness as colonels. (Note: An Englishman Mr Griffiths, Alexander Campbell and Donald Campbell, laird of Barbreck, were lieutenant-colonels; James Henderson, John Fullarton, and John Campbell were majors.) One of Auchinbreck's officers was Robert Duncanson, later notorious for his role in the Glencoe Massacre, whose father was minister at Kilmartin.

Lacking confirmation of Monmouth's landing, divisions emerged within the rebel leadership. With their estates occupied by Atholl's militia, Argyll was unable to raise his tenants, and felt the Campbell levies would not fight while their homes remained at risk. He first decided to march on Inveraray, but under pressure from his Council agreed to send a smaller force to the Lowlands by sea to begin recruiting there. To general frustration, he abandoned this plan the next day; an enraged Cochrane said he would land on the Ayrshire coast "even if he were alone and had nothing but a hayfork in his hand".

Colleagues later complained of Argyll's "peremptory" style, while he accused them of being deliberately obstructive, although he established a good relationship with Rumbold. Unlike Monmouth, Argyll was not widely popular even among his own tenants, whose land rents quadrupled between 1665 and 1685; his Campbell rival Breadalbane raised 800 men to fight for the government. His army never numbered more than 2,500, with some estimates placing it under 1,500, a disappointing figure given the 8,000 who turned out for the 1679 rebellion.

=== Bute and Eilean Dearg ===
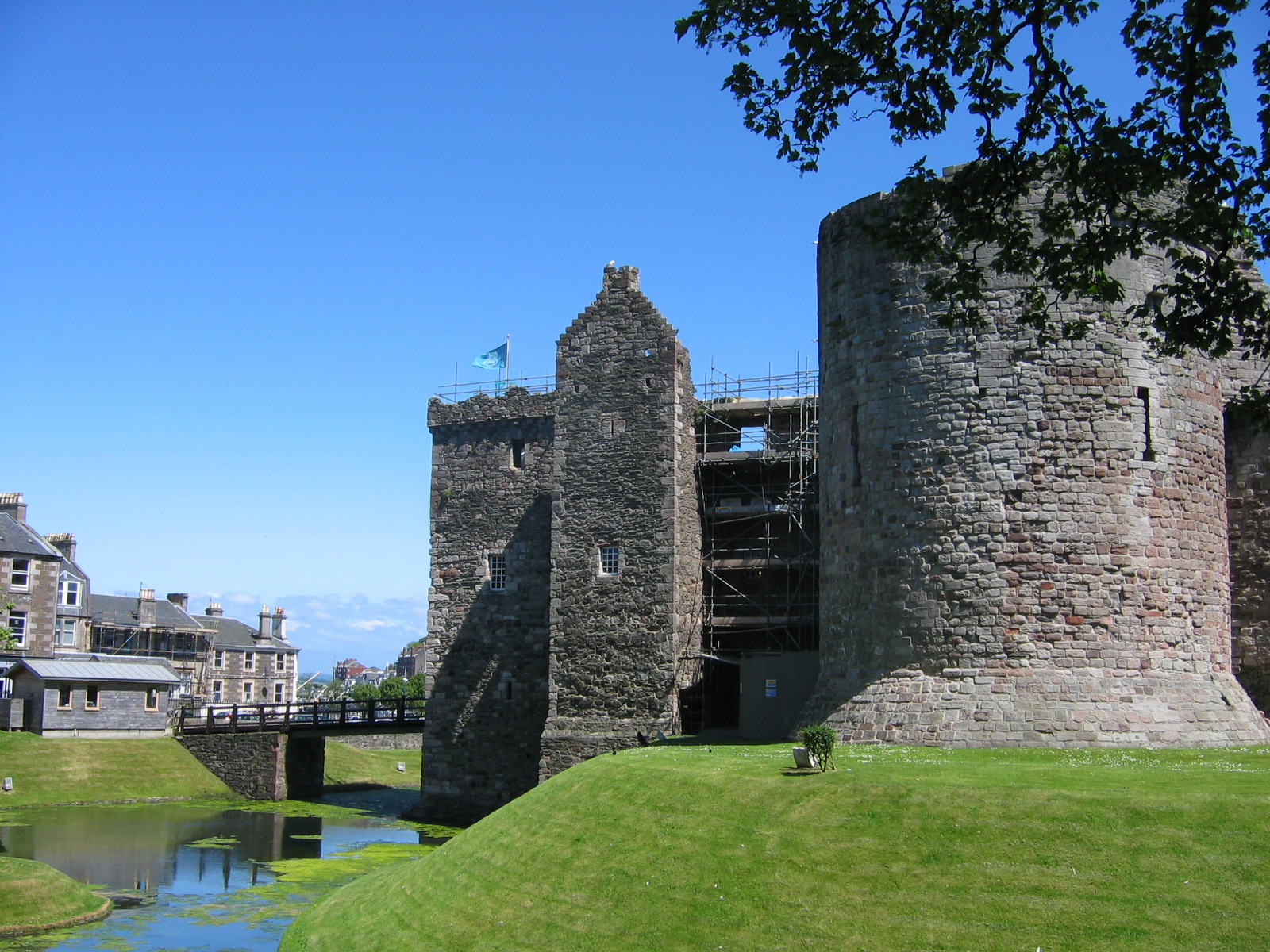
Rothesay Castle on Bute. It was burned by Argyll's forces when they left for the mainland.

The rebels crossed to Bute seeking manpower and supplies, an exercise which proved of little value. They wasted three days looking for boats to transport them, attempts to requisition more on Great Cumbrae failed when Government soldiers crossed from Largs and destroyed them, while looting restricted the number of recruits. Hume wanted to make for the Lowlands, while Argyll insisted they deal with Atholl first; they compromised by sending Cochrane to Renfrewshire with 200 men. Despite routing a troop of militia near Greenock, he found little support for the Rising, and on his return supported Argyll's view.

Argyll established a base at the old castle of Eilean Dearg, Loch Riddon, which was strengthened by additional earthworks; once completed, his ships unloaded their weapons and supplies. Rumbold and his cavalry, plus 300 infantry under Major Henderson, were sent to hold Glendaruel, which ran into Loch Riddon from the north. Rumbold also seized Ardkinglas Castle near Inveraray; Argyll saw this as an opportunity to capture the whole of Argyllshire, but other members of the Council vetoed the idea.

On 11 June, the same day Monmouth finally landed in Dorset, the Council decided to begin a march to the Lowlands, leaving a garrison at Eilean Dearg under Elphinstone of Lapness. Shortly after, Elphinstone was attacked by a Royal Navy squadron including the frigates Kingfisher, Falcon, Mermaid. The garrison abandoned the fort, along with their supplies and the hostages from Orkney, rejoining their colleagues near Loch Long. News of this disaster had a serious effect on morale, and desertions increased.

== March to the Lowlands ==
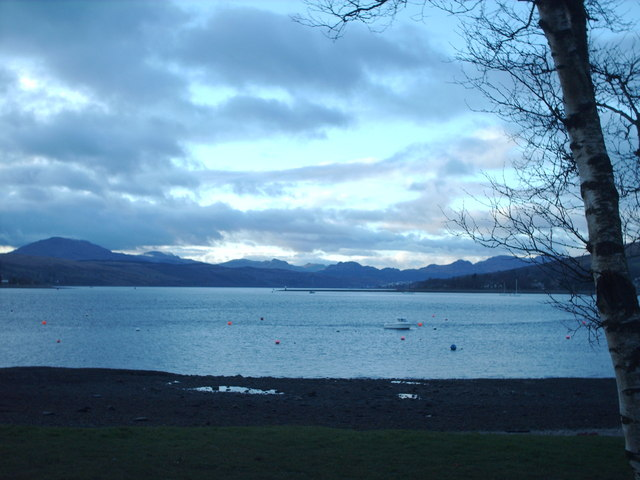
Gare Loch; the rebels skirted the head of the loch while attempting to reach Glasgow.

Low on supplies, the rebels decided to make for the strongly Whig city of Glasgow. Atholl was in pursuit, and the Earl of Dumbarton was stationed near Glasgow in readiness with a force of militia and regulars. Unknown to the rebels, a number of Covenanters had assembled in Wigtownshire with the intention of joining Argyll, but the preacher Alexander Peden had addressed the gatherings and reminded them of Argyll and Monmouth's role in previous repression.

On 16 June the rebels, reduced to less than 1,000 by desertion, crossed the Leven near Dumbarton. On the Stirling road they sighted a government detachment and Argyll, Cochrane and Ayloffe were in favour of an immediate attack, hoping a quick victory would rally support: Hume, however, insisted they continue to Glasgow. In the event, a disastrous night march on 17 June resulted in the dispersal of the remaining forces, despite Rumbold and Argyll's efforts to keep order; Rumbold became separated from the main group of insurgents, and most of the remaining Highlanders deserted. Argyll held a final conference with Cochrane at an inn in the village of Old Kilpatrick by which point he was apparently "scarcely able to speak".

Cochrane allegedly advised him to return to the Highlands with his own clansmen, rather than crossing the River Clyde, although Argyll's own account claimed he was abandoned by his Lowland colleagues. He set off north with a small group of close associates, but after a few miles the group broke up; Campbell of Auchinbreck tried to continue to Argyllshire to raise further men while Argyll went south, accompanied only by Major Fullarton. He disguised himself as a countryman acting as Fullarton's guide: he obtained a farmer's clothing and had already grown a long beard during his previous exile. The two men were stopped by militia while fording a river near Inchinnan, and taken prisoner.

=== The Battle of Muirdykes ===
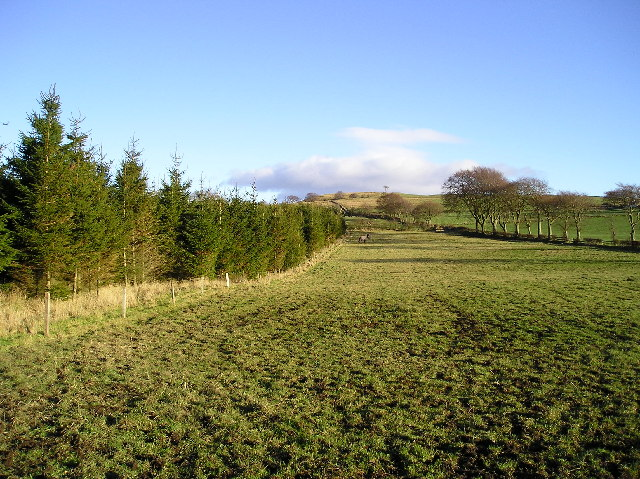
The hillside leading up to Muirdykes Mount, where a group of rebels were attacked by dragoons.

Cochrane, accompanied by Hume, Major James Henderson and about 150 men, had forced a crossing of the Clyde near Old Kilpatrick. After suffering further desertions and driving off a group of militia, a remaining group of 75 reached a place called the Muirdykes, or Muirdykes Mount, near Lochwinnoch, on the afternoon of 18 June. They drew up in a small close protected by low stone walls and were attacked by a troop of dragoons led by Cochrane's relative William, Lord Ross. Cochrane rejected Ross's offer of quarter and successfully defended their position until nightfall; the regulars took several casualties including the wounding of their commander Captain William Cleland. On moving off under cover of darkness the rebels discovered that the dragoons had fled towards Kilmarnock. Hume later wrote "wer I to choose 75 men upon my life’s hazard; I would not reject one of that 75 (and no more ther was) that came of that night".

On 20 June Cochrane received word that Argyll had been taken prisoner, and released the remaining rebels from service, telling them to escape as best they could. Cochrane was captured a week later in his uncle's house in Renfrew. Ayloffe was also taken prisoner, unsuccessfully attempting suicide shortly afterwards. Rumbold was intercepted by militia on the night of 20/21 June near Lesmahagow; on being called to surrender, he was supposed to have said that he "came there to fight for death, not for life". He killed one assailant, wounded two, and captured only when his horse was shot from under him: he was brought to Edinburgh seriously wounded.

== Aftermath ==
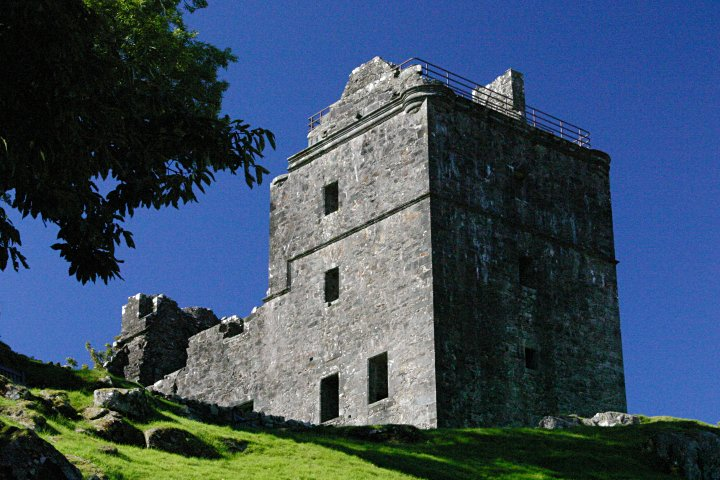
Carnasserie Castle, home of Sir Duncan Campell of Auchinbreck, was amongst those destroyed as a result of the Rising.

While it had been feared "Argyll might have given much trouble", the ease with which the Rising was defeated surprised contemporaries. Lord Fountainhall commented on the "sillinesse" of its end, noting "every one reputed Argile valiant and witty, and Sir John Cochrane neither, and yet Argile sneaks away from the hazard, and Sir John fights stoutly like a man; only, the greatest coward when straitned [...] will fight desperately eneugh". As Argyll was technically incapable of committing further offences since his dubious 1681 treason conviction, he was hurriedly beheaded on 30 June under the 1681 charge, despite acts committed in the interim. Most observers commented on his good humour while awaiting execution; he spent much of the time petitioning on behalf of his tenants, asking that they should not be penalised for their involvement.

Rumbold was tried, convicted of treason on 26th and executed the same day, allegedly to ensure he did not die of his wounds first. Argyll, who sharply criticised Hume and Cochrane in his final letters, wrote "Poor Rumbold was a great support to me and a brave man and died Christianly." His speech on the scaffold was widely printed at the time and quoted afterwards, especially the phrase "none comes into this world with a saddle on his back, neither any booted and spurred to ride him..." Taken to London, Ayloffe was executed at Temple Bar on 30 October, along with Richard Nelthorpe, a fellow Rye House conspirator captured with Monmouth.

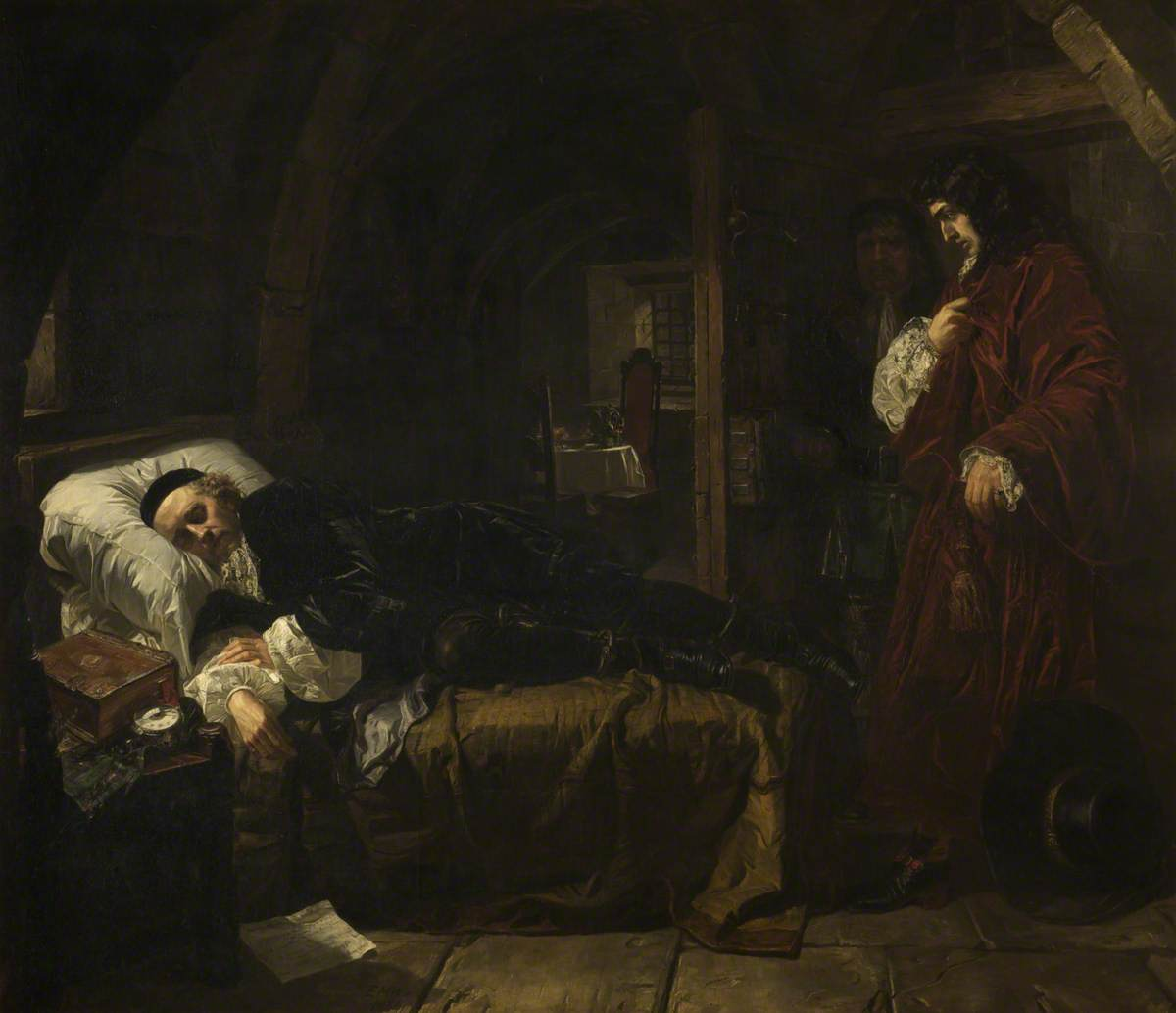
The Last Sleep of the Earl of Argyll by Edward Matthew Ward, 1854

Cochrane was said to have saved himself by agreeing to support James, though a more probable explanation is his father agreed to pay a fine of £5,000. Several other prominent rebels were pardoned, including Argyll's nephew Archibald, who went on to become Bishop of Aberdeen and a non-juror. Accompanied by Duncanson, Campbell of Auchinbreck escaped to Holland, returning after the Glorious Revolution. He petitioned Parliament in 1690, claiming Royalist Maclean clansmen had destroyed Carnasserie Castle, stolen 2,000 head of cattle, hanged his relative Dugald MacTavish of Dunardry, the 14th Hereditary Chief of Clan MacTavish, and "barbarously murdered" his uncle Alexander Campbell of Strondour.

Of the rebel rank and file, 177 were transported to Jamaica and 100 to New Jersey. Amongst those who suffered most from the effects of the Rising were hundreds of Covenanters already held in Government prisons: although they had not taken part in the rebellion, their treatment became substantially worse, and many were also transported. However, the Rising was generally less severely punished than the Monmouth Rebellion, possibly as the authorities recognised many of Argyll's men had been bound by feudal obligations to follow him. Despite the defeat of Argyll's Rising, many of those involved in it would a few years later come to be involved in the Glorious Revolution.

== Sources ==
- Ashcraft, Richard (1986). Revolutionary Politics and Locke's Two Treatises of Government. Princeton University Press.
- Chernaik, Warren (2004). "Ayloffe [Ayliffe], John". Oxford Dictionary of National Biography (online ed.). Oxford University Press. doi:10.1093/ref:odnb/937. (Subscription, Wikipedia Library access or UK public library membership required.)
- Davies, Gordon; Hardacre, Paul (May 1962). "The Restoration of the Scottish Episcopacy, 1660-1661". Journal of British Studies. 1 (2): 32–51. doi:10.1086/385441. S2CID 144583746.
- Davies, Kenneth Gordon (1974). The North Atlantic World in the Seventeenth Century. Oxford University Press. ISBN 978-0816607136.
- De Krey, Gary S. (2007). Restoration and Revolution in Britain. Palgrave. ISBN 978-0333651049.
- Fountainhall, Lauder (1840). Historical Observes of Memorable Occurrents in Church and State, From October 1680 to April 1686 (2019 ed.). Wentworth Press. ISBN 978-0526064717.
- Greaves, Richard (1992). Secrets of the Kingdom: British Radicals from the Popish Plot to the Revolution of 1688-1689. Stanford University Press. ISBN 978-0804720526.
- Gordon, John (1845). New Statistical Account of Scotland; Volume VII. Society for the Benefit of the Sons and Daughters of the Clergy in Scotland.
- Harris, Tim; Taylor, Stephen, eds. (2015). The Final Crisis of the Stuart Monarchy. Boydell & Brewer. ISBN 978-1783270446.
- Harris, Tim (2007). Revolution; the Great Crisis of the British Monarchy 1685-1720. Penguin. ISBN 978-0141016528.
- Howell, Thomas (1816). A Complete Collection of State Trials and Proceedings for High Treason; Volume IX. TC Hansard.
- Kennedy, Allan (2014). Governing Gaeldom: The Scottish Highlands and the Restoration State, 1660-1688. Brill. ISBN 978-9004248373.
- Kennedy, Allan (2016). "Rebellion, Government and the Scottish Response to Argyll's Rising of 1685" (PDF). Journal of Scottish Historical Studies. 1 (2): 40–59. doi:10.3366/jshs.2016.0167.
- Mackie, JD; Lenman, Bruce; Parker, Geoffrey (1986). A History of Scotland. Hippocrene Books. ISBN 978-0880290401.
- Mitchison, Rosalind; Fry, Peter; Fry, Fiona (2002). A History of Scotland. Routledge. ISBN 978-1138174146.
- Rose, George Henry (1831). A Selection from the Papers of the Earls of Marchmont Volume VIII. John Murray.
- Somers, John (2014) [1843]. A Collection Of Scarce And Valuable Tracts, On The Most Interesting And Entertaining Subjects: Reign Of King James II. Reign Of King William III. Nabu Press. ISBN 978-1293842225.
- Spiers, Edward; Crang, Jeremy; Strickland, Matthew (2014). A Military History of Scotland. Edinburgh University Press. ISBN 978-0748694495.
- Watt, Douglas (2006). "'The Laberinth of Their Difficulties': The Influence of Debt on the Highland Elite c. 1550 - 1700". The Scottish Historical Review. 85 (219): 28–51. JSTOR 25529884.
- Webb, Stephen (1999). Lord Churchill's Coup: The Anglo-American Empire and the Glorious Revolution. Syracuse University Press. ISBN 978-0815605584.
- Willcock, John (1907). A Scots Earl in Covenanting Times: Being the Life and Times of Archibald, 9th Earl of Argyll (1629-1685). Elliott.
- Wodrow, Robert (1835). The History of the Sufferings of the Church of Scotland. Vol. 4.
