= 1687 in Scotland =

- Centuries: 15th; 16th; 17th; 18th; 19th
- Decades: 1660s; 1670s; 1680s; 1690s; 1700s
- See also: List of years in Scotland; Timeline of Scottish history 1687 in: England • Elsewhere

Events from 1687 in the Kingdom of Scotland.

== Incumbents ==
- Monarch – James VII
- Secretary of State – John Drummond, 1st Earl of Melfort

== Events ==
- 12 February – Declaration of Indulgence proclaimed by James VII, a first step towards freedom of religion.
- 29 May – Order of the Thistle founded

== Births ==
unknown date

- George Douglas, 2nd Earl of Dumbarton (died 1749)

== Deaths ==
unknown date

- James Aitken (bishop) (born 1612/13)

== See also ==
- Timeline of Scottish history
