= Alexander Anderson (minister) =

Scottish minister

Alexander Anderson (1676–1737) was a Church of Scotland minister who served as Moderator of the General Assembly in 1735.

== Life ==
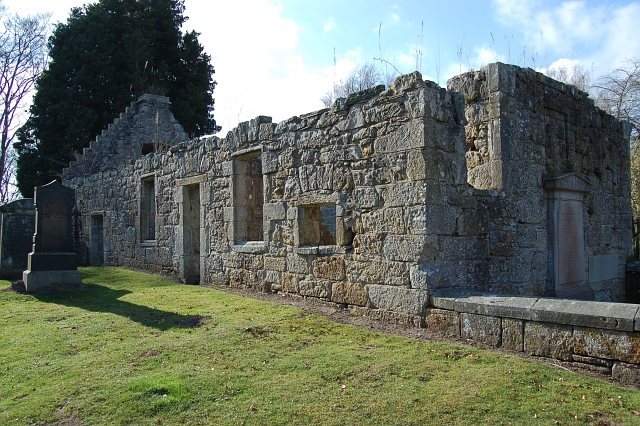
The ruins of old Kemback Church

He was born in St Andrews around 1676 the son of John Anderson, Principal of St Leonards College in St Andrews. He studied at the same college graduating M.A. in July 1697. He was licensed to preach as a Church of Scotland minister by the Presbytery of St Andrews in February 1700.

In September 1700 he was ordained as minister of Kemback Parish Church. He translated to Falkland Parish Church in May 1702. In April 1725 he translated to St Andrews Parish Church.

In 1735 he succeeded Rev James Gordon as Moderator of the General Assembly of the Church of Scotland the highest position in the Scottish church.

He died on 9 November 1737 aged 61.

== Family ==
He married Isabella Hay (d.1720) daughter of Francis Hay of Strowie. Their children included:

- James Anderson of Newbigging (1719–1794) advocate
- Margaret Anderson, married Rev Laurence Watson, second charge minister of St Leonard's Church under Anderson and later married Rev Lauchlan McIntosh of Errol

== Publications ==
Not known
