= Newbridge Inn =

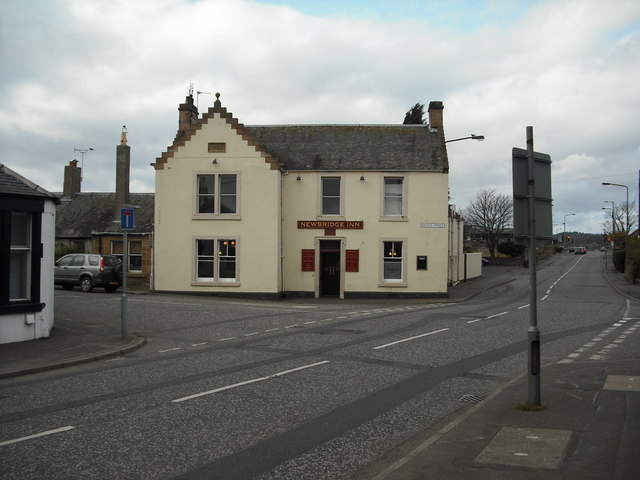
- Newbridge Inn

- Location in Edinburgh
- 55.9393°N 3.4081°W

Listed Building – Category C(S)
- Designated: 30 January 1981
- Reference no.: LB27575

The Newbridge Inn is a public house in Newbridge, a suburban village to the west of Edinburgh, Scotland. The inn was founded in 1683. The present building is dated 1895 and is a category C(S) listed building. It is located at the corner of Old Liston Road and Bridge Street, which was formerly the main route from Edinburgh to Glasgow.

== Proprietors ==
The Newbridge Inn was built in 1683 on land owned by Archibald Hope of Raukellour. On 12 December 1700 he sold some of the land, including the Inn, to John Dundas for "20 merks Scots money, 2 lambs, to be given on Whitsunday and Marksmas and 6 good hens yearly on Whitsunday". On 16 July 1726 John Dundas sold the land and the Inn to James Liston for the sum of £385.15.6d. On 6 April 6, 1737 Liston sold it to Patrick Hay for "a certain sum of money as the agreed and adequate price and hold me well content and satisfied and paid". In 1759 on 22 August, Patrick Hay sold the land and the Inn to George Reid, a brewer and farmer, for £200.0.0d. George in turn willed it to his son Cumberland Reid on 14 June 1815 and in 1818, Cumberland left it to his nephew, John Reid, a merchant from Leith. John sold it to his brother James for sum of £700.0.0d on 27 August 1821. On 25 March 1824 James Reid sold only the Inn to Helen Cowie Buchanan for £465.0.0d. After 62 years, Helen sold on to Robert Gordon on 15 May 1866 for £725.0.0d. Robert Gordon took a loss and sold it on to John Aitkinson for £665.0.0d. On 3 July 1877 it was sold yet again for £300.0.0d to James Masterton. After his death the inn passed to his wife Christina Garlick Masterton who gave it to her younger son, John Masterton. John sold it on to his brother James Masterton for £250.0.0d in 1898. In 1930, James Masterton Jnr willed it to his nephew, James Yule Wemyss in 1952. When James died, his wife Pleasance Cecilly Wemyss took over the running of the Inn in 1963. After 106 years and four generations in the same family, the Newbridge Inn was sold to David and June Morris on 28 June 1983.

== Sources ==
- Extracts have been taken from the original title deeds still in existence, dating from 1683 to the present day.
