= John Cochrane of Ochiltree =

Scottish nobleman

Sir John Cochrane of Ochiltree (d.c. 1707) was a Scottish nobleman, soldier, and conspirator.

== Early life ==
Cochrane was the second son of William Cochrane, 1st Earl of Dundonald, by Eupheme, daughter of Sir William Scott of Ardross, Director of Chancery at the Court of Session.

== Career ==
He was one of the main promoters of the Carolina Company which established a Scottish colony at Port Royal, South Carolina.

Cochrane was implicated in the Rye House Plot (1683) and the Monmouth Rebellion, but escaped to Rotterdam, where he remained till the death of Charles II. On the accession of James II he was attainted while still abroad. He took part in the Earl of Argyll's insurrection in 1685, on the suppression of which he was harboured for a time by his kinsman, Gavin Cochrane of Renfrew. Betrayed by Gavin Cochrane's wife, whose brother had fallen in a skirmish on the royalist side, he was carried to Edinburgh, led through the streets by the hangman, and lodged in the Tolbooth. Charged with high treason he is said by Lord Fountainhall to have turned approver and saved his head. Burnet states that the Earl of Dundonald bought his son's pardon by a payment of £5,000 to 'the priests,' and denies that Cochrane disclosed anything of importance.

On the promulgation of the declaration of indulgence he was employed (1687) to urge its acceptance upon the Presbyterians. His estates were restored to him in 1689.

He subsequently held the position of farmer of the poll tax, and in 1695, failing to give satisfactory account of moneys received by him in that capacity, was committed to prison.

== Personal life ==
By his wife Margaret, daughter of Sir William Strickland of Boynton, Yorkshire, one of Cromwell's lords of parliament, he had two sons.

The date of his death is uncertain.
