= Baillie of Jerviswood =

Scottish conspirator incriminated in the Rye House Plot

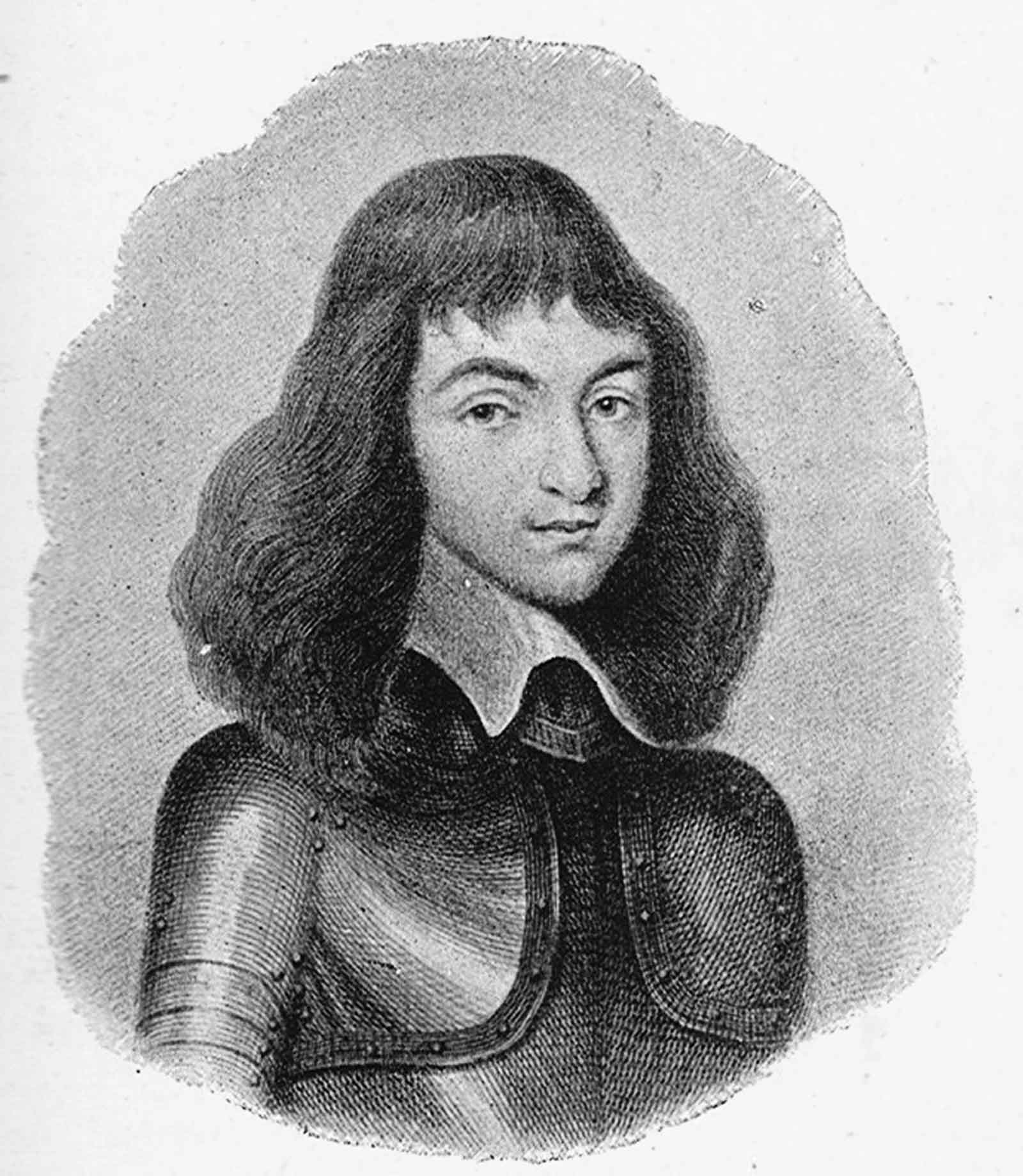
Baillie of Jerviswood

Robert Baillie (known as Baillie of Jerviswood; c. 1634 – 24 December 1684) was a Scottish conspirator incriminated in the Rye House Plot against King Charles II. He was executed for treason.

Baillie was the son of George Baillie of St John's Kirk, Lanarkshire, who had bought the estate of Jerviswood in 1636 and of Mellerstain in 1643, under Charles I. He incurred the resentment of the Scottish government by rescuing, in June 1676, his brother-in-law James Kirkton, a Presbyterian Church of Scotland minister who had been seized and confined in a house by Carstairs, an informer. He was fined £500, remaining in prison for four months and then being liberated on paying half the fine to Carstairs. In despair at the state of his country, he determined in 1683 to emigrate to South Carolina, but the plan came to nothing.

The same year, Baillie, with some of his friends, went to London and entered into communication with the Duke of Monmouth, Lord Russell, and their party to conspire to bring Monmouth to the throne; and on the discovery of the Rye House Plot, Baillie was arrested. Questioned by King Charles, Baillie denied any knowledge of the conspiracy, but would not deny that he had been consulted with the view of an insurrection in Scotland. He was subsequently put in irons and sent back a prisoner to Scotland. Although no evidence has come to light to support his connection with the plot, he was fined £6,000 and kept in close confinement.

On 23 December 1684, he was brought up again before the High Court on the charge of treason. He was pronounced guilty the next day and hanged the same afternoon at the Mercat Cross at Edinburgh.

Bishop Burnet, who was his cousin, describes him as "in the presbyterian principles but ... a man of great piety and virtue, learned in the law, in mathematics and in languages". He married a sister of Lord Warriston, and left a son, George, who took refuge in Holland, afterwards returning with William III and being restored to his estates before marrying Lady Grizel Hume.
