= Richard Nelthorpe =

Richard Nelthorpe (died 1685) was an English lawyer, a conspirator in the Rye House Plot.

== Life ==
He was son of James Nelthorpe of Charterhouse, London. On 7 December 1669 he was admitted to Gray's Inn.

Nelthorpe was involved in the Rye House plot to assassinate the king, and on its failure escaped with another lawyer, Nathaniel Wade, to Scarborough, They took ship to Rotterdam, and arrived at Amsterdam at the end of June 1683. His chambers in the Temple, together with those of his associate Richard Goodenough, were closely searched on 20 June, but with no result.

Finding that the States-General had resolved to arrest them, Nelthorpe and Wade fled to Vevey in Switzerland, and were welcomed by Edmund Ludlow. Meanwhile a reward was offered by royal proclamation for Nelthorpe's apprehension, and on 12 July a grand jury found a true bill against him. He was accordingly outlawed.

Nelthorpe became an adherent of the Duke of Monmouth, and landed with him at Lyme Regis in 1685. After the battle of Sedgemoor he was sheltered by Alice Lisle at her house in Hampshire, but his hiding-place was betrayed by one Barter. He was examined on 9 August, refused to divulge anything of a serious nature, and was so badly treated that he temporarily lost his reason. He was executed under his old outlawry before the gate of Gray's Inn, on 30 October 1685. In the next reign his attainder was reversed. He left a widow and five children. One of the children, a son, moved to Denmark, where the name was changed to the similar but more Danish-appearing Nelthropp.
