= David Falconer =

British judge (1640–1685)

Sir David Falconer
- Born: 1640
- Died: 15 December 1685 (aged 44–45); Edinburgh, Midlothian
- Occupation: Scottish judge
- Children: Catherine Falconer, Alexander Falconer (son)
- Parent(s): Sir David Falconer of Glenfarquhar (father), Margaret Hepburn (mother)

Sir David Falconer of Newton, Midlothian (1640 – Edinburgh, Midlothian, 15 December 1685) was a Scottish judge.

== Biography ==
He was the second son of Sir David Falconer of Glenfarquhar, one of the Commissaries of Edinburgh, and the former Margaret Hepburn, and younger brother of Sir Alexander Falconer of Glenfarquhar. His paternal grandfather was a brother of Sir Alexander Falconer, the 1st Lord Falconer of Halkerton.

He studied Law under his father, and having passed advocate on 3 July 1661, was afterwards appointed one of the commissaries of Edinburgh, and was knighted. On 24 May 1676, he was nominated a Lord of Session, and on 2 March 1678, was admitted a Lord of Justiciary. On 5 June 1682, he was appointed Lord President of the Court of Session, and in the parliament of 1685 he represented the County of Forfar. He was elected a Lord of the Articles, and a member of three commissions then appointed; one for trade, another for the plantation of kirks, and a third for the regulation of inferior judicatories.

Falconer collected the decisions of the Court of Session from November 1681 to 9 December 1685, when he ceased to sit in court. They were published in 1705 by John Spottiswood.

He died at Edinburgh, after a short illness, on 15 December 1685, and was buried in Greyfriars Kirkyard, where a monument was erected to his memory. The monument stands on the outer north-east corner of the church.

Sir Alexander, second baronet and fourth lord, died without issue, 17 March 1727, when the baronetcy is presumed to have become extinct. By his wife Anne, (only child of John, 9th Lord Lindsay of the Byres) he had a daughter Agnes (She married George Ogilvy, 2nd Lord Banff).

The title of 5th Lord Falconer of Halkertoun devolved on David Falconer. His third daughter, Catherine Falconer, married Joseph Home of Chirnside in the County of Berwick, an advocate of Ninewells, and was the mother of David Hume, the philosopher and historian.

== Attributiin ==
- "Falconer, David" . Dictionary of National Biography. London: Smith, Elder & Co. 1885–1900.
- The Scottish Nation, or the Surnames, Families, Literature, Honours and Biographical History of The People of Scotland, William Anderson, 1863

Preceded by George Gordon	Lord President of the Court of Session; 1682–1685	Succeeded by George Lockhart
