= William Douglas, 1st Duke of Queensberry =

Scottish politician (1637–1695)

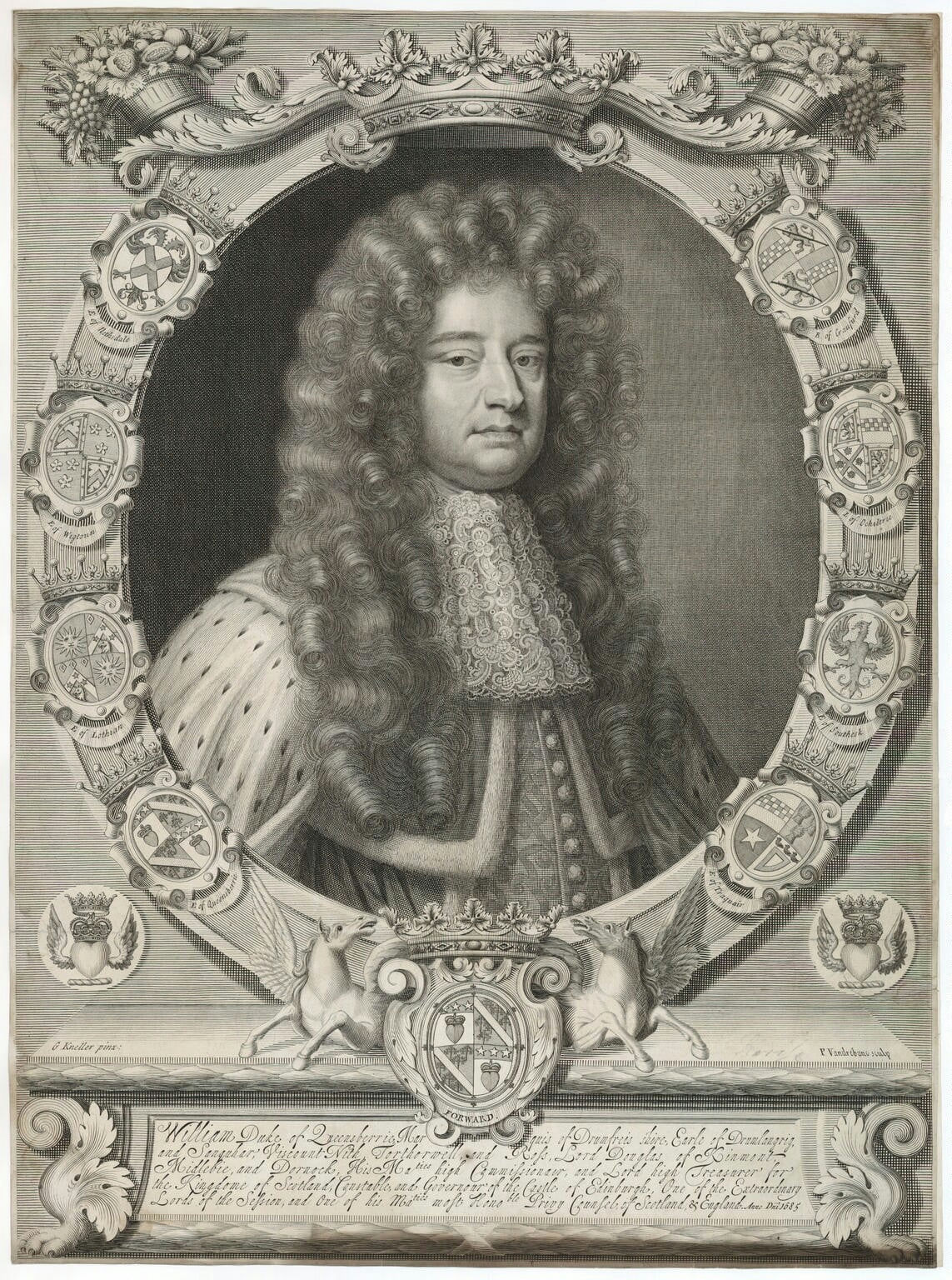
Engraving of the 1st Duke of Queensberry by Peter Vanderbank

William Douglas, 1st Duke of Queensberry PC (1637 – 28 March 1695), also 3rd Earl of Queensberry and 1st Marquess of Queensberry, was a Scottish politician.

He was the son of James Douglas, 2nd Earl of Queensberry and his second wife Margaret Stewart, daughter of John Stewart, 1st Earl of Traquair. He succeeded his father as Earl of Queensberry in 1671 and took his seat in the Parliament of Scotland on 12 June 1672.

== Career ==
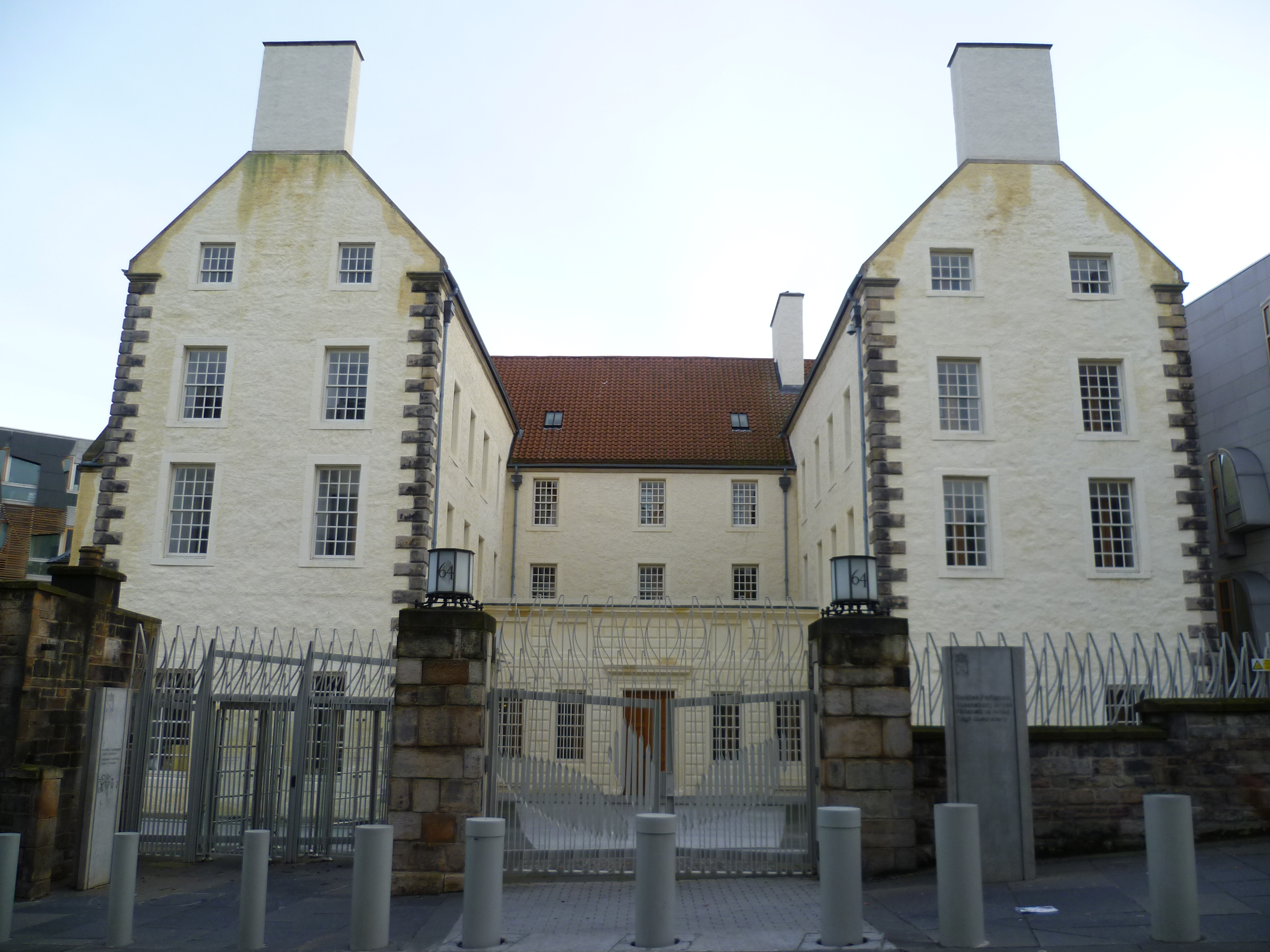
Queensberry House, Edinburgh

He was appointed a Scottish Privy Councillor in 1667, Lord Justice General from 1680 to 1682, and Lord High Treasurer of Scotland from 1682 to 1686. He was created Marquess of Queensberry on 11 February 1682 and Duke of Queensberry on 3 November 1684, with remainder to his heirs male. He refused to support James VII's measures against the established church in 1685. He was Lord President of the Privy Council from 1686 to 1689. From 1685 he was one of the lords of the Privy Council for both Scotland and England, but in 1687 he was accused of maladministration by James Drummond, 4th Earl of Perth and was stripped of his appointments.

He assented to the accession of William and Mary and again enjoyed the royal favour before he died, being appointed Extraordinary Lord of Session in 1693.

He acquired what is now known as Queensberry House on the Royal Mile in 1689 and died there.

== Personal life ==
He married Lady Isabel Douglas, daughter of William Douglas, 1st Marquess of Douglas and Lady Mary Gordon, in 1657, and they had issue:

1. Lady Anne Douglas, Countess of Wemyss (died from injuries following her clothes going on fire, 23 February 1700)
2. James Douglas, 2nd Duke of Queensberry (1662–1711)
3. William Douglas, 1st Earl of March (died 9 September 1705), grandfather of the 4th Duke
4. George Douglas

Political offices
Preceded by The Earl of Balcarres	Lord High Treasurer of Scotland; 1682–1686	In commission
Parliament of Scotland
Preceded by James, Duke of York and Albany	Lord High Commissioner; 1685	Succeeded by Alexander Stuart, 5th Earl of Moray
Legal offices
Preceded by George Mackenzie of Tarbat	Lord Justice General; 1680–1682	Succeeded by James Drummond, 4th Earl of Perth
Peerage of Scotland
New creation	Duke of Queensberry; 1684–1695	Succeeded by James Douglas
New creation	Marquess of Queensberry; 1682–1695	Succeeded by James Douglas
Preceded by James Douglas	Earl of Queensberry; 1671–1695	Succeeded by James Douglas
