= Richard Maitland, 4th Earl of Lauderdale =

Scottish politician

Richard Maitland, 4th Earl of Lauderdale (20 June 1653, Haltoun House – 1695, Paris, France) was a Scottish politician.

== Life ==
He was the eldest son of Charles Maitland, 3rd Earl of Lauderdale, and his spouse Elizabeth Lauder. Before succeeding to the Lauderdale title, Richard Maitland was styled "of Over-Gogar", one of the Haltoun properties. Thereafter he was known as Lord Maitland until his own succession as 4th Earl.

On 9 October 1678 he was sworn a Privy Councillor and appointed joint General of the Mint with his father. From 3 April 1680 he was Lord Justice Clerk, but in 1684 he was deprived of that office, on account of suspected communications with his father-in-law, Argyll, who had escaped in 1681 to Holland. However, by 1687 he was restored to favour, appointed Treasurer-depute, and supported James II and VII when he was deposed in a coup by his son-in-law, William, who had been invited to take the throne by a group of nobles who were disaffected by James' Catholicism and alarmed by the prospect of a Catholic succession occasioned by the birth of his heir, James Francis Edward. James' flight from his son-in-law's army was falsely depicted as an "abdication" by its supporters, and the coup became known among those supporting it as "The Glorious Revolution".

Richard, Lord Maitland, was present at the Battle of the Boyne on the side of King James, 1 July 1690, after which he retired to Limerick and subsequently went to the exiled Court of James II at Saint-Germain-en-Laye. The following year he succeeded to the Earldom of Lauderdale, but was outlawed by the Court of Justiciary on 23 July 1694.

Whilst in exile in France he translated the works of Virgil into English, published posthumously as The Works of Virgil Translated into English Verse, pub Bernard Lintott, at the Cross Keys, Fleet Street, 1709. Dryden had a copy "The late Earl of Lauderdale sent me his new translation of the Aenis: which he had finished before I ingag'd in the same Design...

The 4th Earl of Lauderdale married, 1 July 1678, Anne (d. 1734) daughter of Archibald Campbell, 9th Earl of Argyll. They left no issue and the Earldom passed to Richard's brother, John Lauder or Maitland, 5th Earl of Lauderdale. He died in 1695.

Peerage of Scotland
Preceded by Charles Maitland	Earl of Lauderdale; 1691–1695	Succeeded by John Maitland
