= Robert Duncanson (Scots Army officer) =

Scottish soldier (1658–1705)

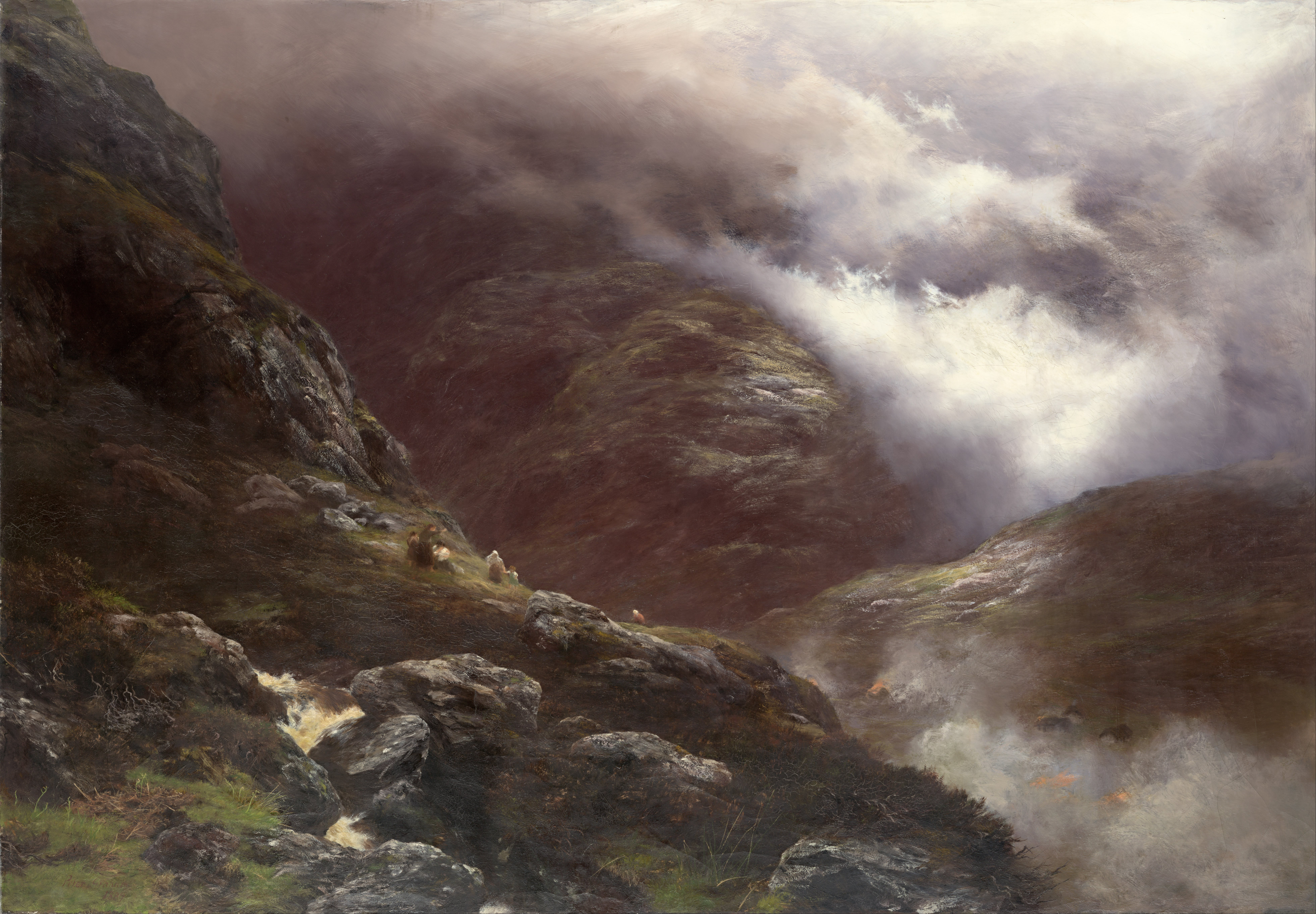
- After the Massacre of Glencoe by Peter Graham, 1889; Duncanson commanded the operation
- Born: c. 1658; Inveraray, Argyll, Scotland
- Died: 8 May 1705 (aged 47–48); Valencia de Alcantara, Spain
- Military career
- Allegiance: Scotland
- Branch: Scots Army
- Service years: 1689–1705
- Rank: Colonel
- Units: Huntingdon's Regiment, later the 33rd Regiment of Foot
- Conflicts: Argyll's Rising; 1689 Jacobite Rising; Massacre of Glencoe; Nine Years' War; Storming of Dottignies, Diksmuide; War of the Spanish Succession; Venlo Valencia de Alcantara

Robert Duncanson, 1658 to May 1705, was a Scottish professional soldier from Inveraray; a retainer of the Earl of Argyll, he began his career during the 1685 Argyll's Rising, and is now best remembered for his involvement in the February 1692 Glencoe massacre.

Following the failure of the 1685 Rising, he escaped to the Dutch Republic, and returned after the 1688 Glorious Revolution in Scotland. During the Jacobite rising of 1689, he commanded the Earl of Argyll's Regiment of Foot, the primary unit involved in the Massacre, after which he was posted to Flanders for the Nine Years' War, where he remained until the 1697 Treaty of Ryswick.

When the War of the Spanish Succession began in 1701, he served in Flanders until 1704, when he was posted to Spain and Portugal; in May 1705, he died of wounds sustained leading an assault on the Spanish border town of Valencia de Alcantara.

== Biography ==
Robert Duncanson was one of four children born to John Duncanson (c.1630–1687), and his first wife, Beatrix Campbell; his date of birth is unknown, but is estimated as being around 1658 to 1660. Originally from Stirlingshire, John was appointed minister at Kilmartin in 1655, a Church of Scotland parish controlled by Earls of Argyll. He was one of the dissidents removed by the Rescissory Act 1661; although appointed to Kilbrandon and Kilchattan, he was removed again in 1684.

== Career ==
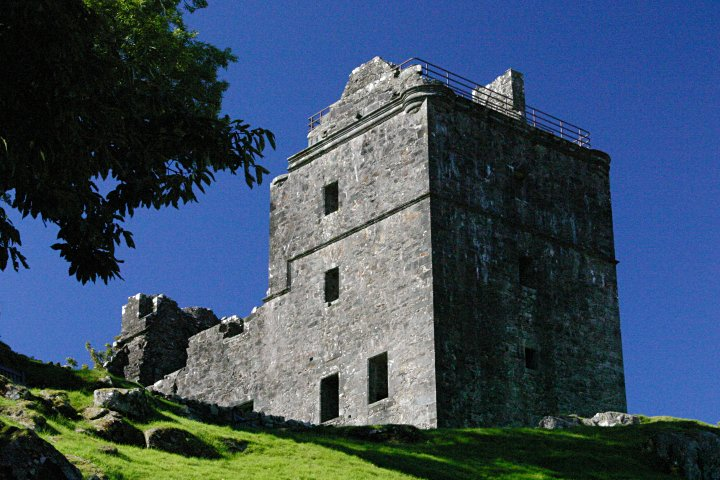
Carnasserie Castle, seat of Sir Duncan Campell of Auchinbreck; destroyed after the 1685 Rising

Little is known of Duncanson's early years, and there is no record of any marriage; the first time he makes an appearance was during Argyll's Rising in 1685, launched in response to the succession of the Catholic James II. The local laird at Kilmartin was Campbell of Auchinbreck, hereditary Lieutenant-Colonel to the Earls of Argyll and one of the few to actively support the revolt. Both Duncanson and his father helped recruit clan levies for the Rising; after it failed, the two went into exile in the Dutch Republic along with Auchinbreck.

English and Scottish volunteers had served in the Dutch military since the 1570s, grouped in what became known as the Scots Brigade. By the 1680s, it contained three Scottish and three English regiments, many officers being religious or political exiles. After the Glorious Revolution in 1688, these exiles were used to replace those loyal to James II or appointed to new regiments raised by the Scottish and English Parliaments.

One of these was William Beveridge; on 28 February 1689, Duncanson was commissioned as an Ensign in the newly formed Beveridge's Regiment, later 14th Foot and promoted Captain-Lieutenant on 24 September. With the commencement of the 1689 Jacobite Rising in March, the Parliament of Scotland authorised Archibald Campbell, 1st Duke of Argyll to raise a unit of 800 men, known as the Earl of Argyll's Regiment of Foot. Duncanson joined as Major in July 1690 and remained with it until disbanded in February 1697; it seems he was in effective operational control for most of that period.

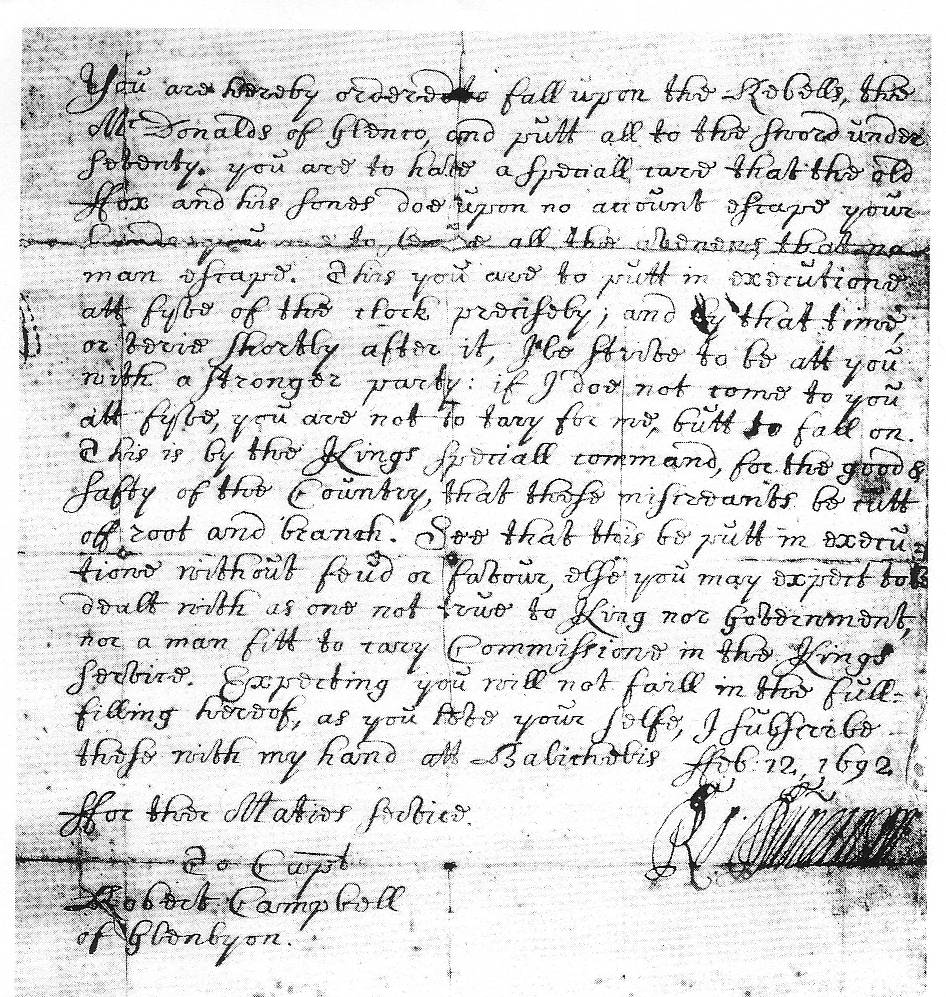
A copy of Duncanson's written orders to Glenlyon (Note: You are hereby ordered to fall upon the rebells, the McDonalds of Glenco, and put all to the sword under seventy. you are to have a speciall care that the old Fox and his sones doe upon no account escape your hands, you are to secure all the avenues that no man escape. This you are to putt in execution att fyve of the clock precisely; and by that time, or very shortly after it, I’ll strive to be att you with a stronger party: if I doe not come to you att fyve, you are not to tarry for me, but to fall on. This is by the Kings speciall command, for the good & safety of the Country, that these miscreants be cutt off root and branch. See that this be putt in execution without feud or favour, else you may expect to be dealt with as one not true to King nor Government, nor a man fitt to carry Commissione in the Kings service. Expecting you will not faill in the full-filling hereof, as you love your selfe, I subscribe these with my hand att Balicholis Feb: 12, 1692.)

The Argylls became operational shortly after the Jacobite victory at Killiecrankie in July 1689 and were based at Perth to counter an advance towards Edinburgh. This threat never arose and in July 1690 they moved to Fort William as part of the force commanded by Colonel John Hill, the military governor tasked with pacifying the Highlands. This included Colonel Hill's own regiment which was commanded by Lt-Colonel James Hamilton and is often confused with the Argylls. The next 18 months were spent retaking or destroying strongpoints captured by anti-government forces after Killiecrankie, including Castle Stalker, Duart Castle and Cairnburgh Castle.

At the end of January 1692, two companies of the Argylls under Captain Robert Campbell of Glenlyon were sent to Glencoe where they were billeted on the local MacDonalds. Officially this was to collect property tax; payment in kind or 'free quarter' was a common means of paying tax in a largely non-cash society. As instructed by Lord Stair, Secretary of State for Scotland, on 12 February Colonel Hill issued orders to Lt-Colonel Hamilton and Duncanson. Hamilton was to block the northern exits of Glencoe at Kinlochleven while Duncanson would join Glenlyon at the southern end, then sweep north.

Glenlyon began the operation as ordered at 4:00 am on 13 February; in all, 38 people were killed and another 40 died of exposure. Casualties might have been considerably higher but both Duncanson and Hamilton were delayed by severe weather and not in position until 11:00. The Scottish Parliamentary Commission set up to investigate the Massacre in 1695 focused on whether orders had been exceeded, not their legality. They were unable to reach a conclusion on Duncanson and left the decision to William III who took no further action.

Shortly after Glencoe, a threatened Jacobite invasion meant the Argylls moved to Brentford in England. When this failed to occur, they transferred to Flanders in early 1693 and suffered heavy casualties attacking French fortifications at Dottignies on 9 July. The unit became 'Lord Lorne's Regiment' in April 1694, when Argyll's eldest son became Colonel. Operational command was exercised by Lt-Colonel Hume, who was severely wounded at Namur in 1695, leaving Duncanson as senior officer.

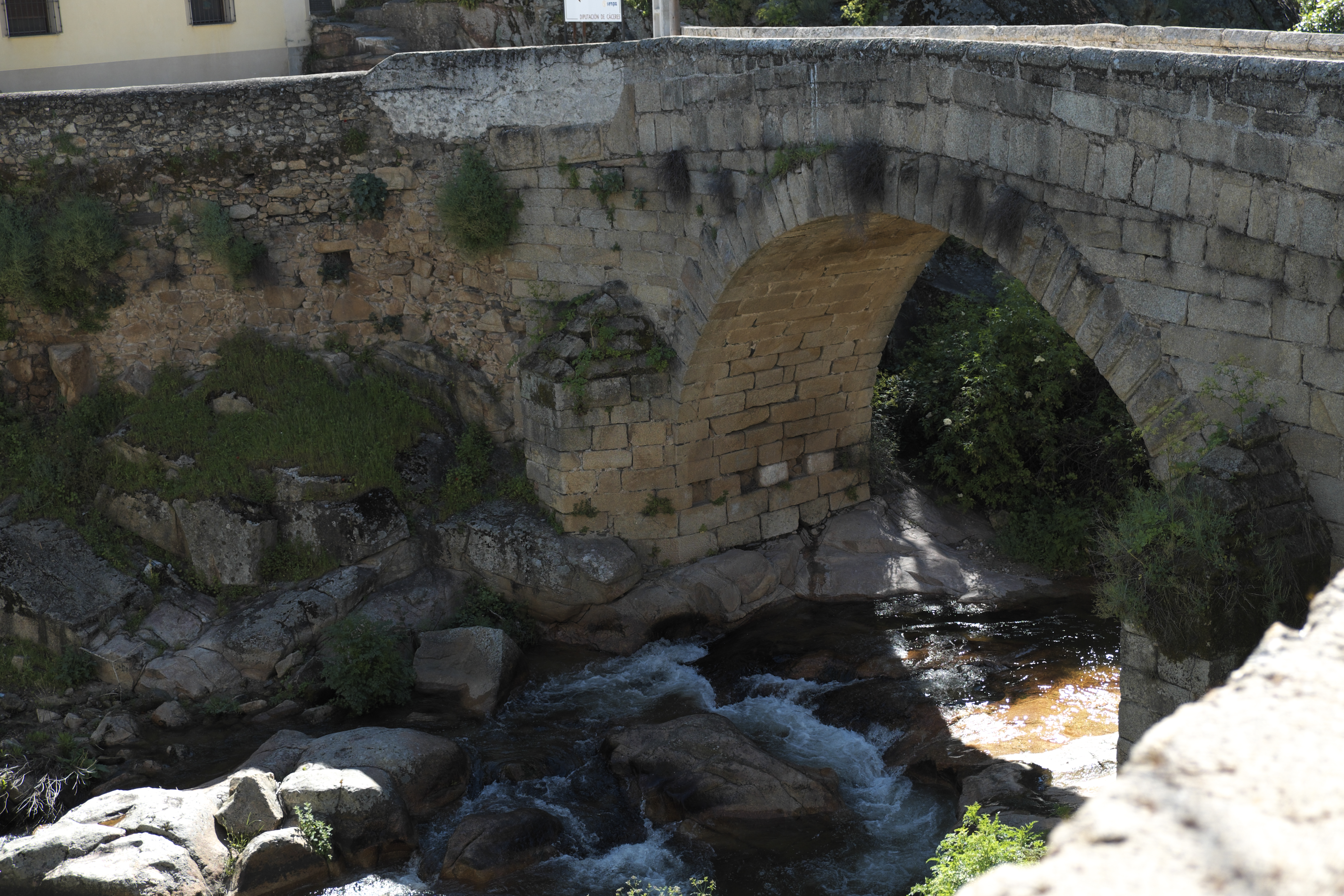
Valencia de Alcantara; bridge leading to town gate, Duncanson was wounded nearby

This meant he was in command when the regiment was part of the garrison at Diksmuide, a strategic point for the Siege of Namur. Besieged by the French on 25 July, the garrison commander Ellenberg capitulated two days later; Duncanson protested and refused to sign the terms of surrender. He was later promoted Lt-Colonel as a reward, but Ellenberg was executed in November, and the other signatories dismissed.

After the prisoners were exchanged in September, Lorne's was based in Damme; by 1696, the war was winding down and it was recorded as being disbanded or 'broke' in February 1697. Duncanson went onto half-pay and spent several years in Debtor's prison, for £1,200 owed to a Joseph Ashley for clothing supplied to the regiment in 1696; this was eventually settled by the Treasury.

When the War of the Spanish Succession began in 1701, the army expanded once again, and he was appointed Lt-Colonel of Huntingdon's Regiment. After serving in Flanders, this was transferred to Portugal in 1704 as part of the expeditionary force which supported the claim of Archduke Charles to the Spanish throne. Promoted Colonel in February 1705, Duncanson died of wounds sustained leading an assault on the Spanish border town of Valencia de Alcantara on 8 May.

== Sources ==
- Cannon, Richard (1846). Historical Record of the British Army; the 14th Regiment of Foot (2015 ed.). Leopold Classic Library.
- Childs, John (1984). "The Scottish brigade in the service of the Dutch Republic, 1689 to 1782". Documentatieblad Werkgroep Achttiende. 16.
- Childs, John (1991). The Nine Years' War and the British Army, 1688-1697: The Operations in the Low Countries. Manchester University Press. ISBN 0719034612.
- Cobbett, William; Howell, Thomas (1814). Cobbett's Complete Collection of State Trials And Proceedings For High Treason And Other Crimes And Misdemeanors (2011 ed.). Nabu Press. ISBN 1175882445.
- Dalton, Charles (1904). English army lists and commission registers, 1661–1714; Volume III. Government and General Publishers.
- Drenth, Wienand (17 April 2011). "Dixmuide and Deinze 1695".
- Hopkins, Paul (2004). "Duncanson, Robert". Oxford Dictionary of National Biography (online ed.). Oxford University Press. doi:10.1093/ref:odnb/8223. (Subscription, Wikipedia Library access or UK public library membership required.)
- Holden, Robert Mackenzie (1905). "The First Highland Regiment: The Argyllshire Highlanders". The Scottish Historical Review. 3 (9).
- House of Commons Journal Volume 12: 11 March 1699. Journal of the House of Commons. Vol. 12, 1697–1699. House of Commons. 1803.
- Kennedy, Allan (2016). "Rebellion, Government and the Scottish Response to Argyll's Rising of 1685" (PDF). Journal of Scottish Historical Studies. 36 (1): 40–59. doi:10.3366/jshs.2016.0167.
- Lemire, B (1997). Dress, Culture and Commerce: The English Clothing Trade before the Factory, 1660-1800 (2014 ed.). Palgrave Macmillan. ISBN 1349396680.
- Somers, John (1845). Scott, Sir Walter (ed.). A Collection of Scarce And Valuable Tracts, On The Most Interesting And Entertaining Subjects: Reign of King James II & King William III (2015 ed.). Nabu Press. ISBN 978-1293842225.
