= Massacre of Glencoe =

1692 killing of clan Macdonald members

- Part of Jacobite rising of 1689
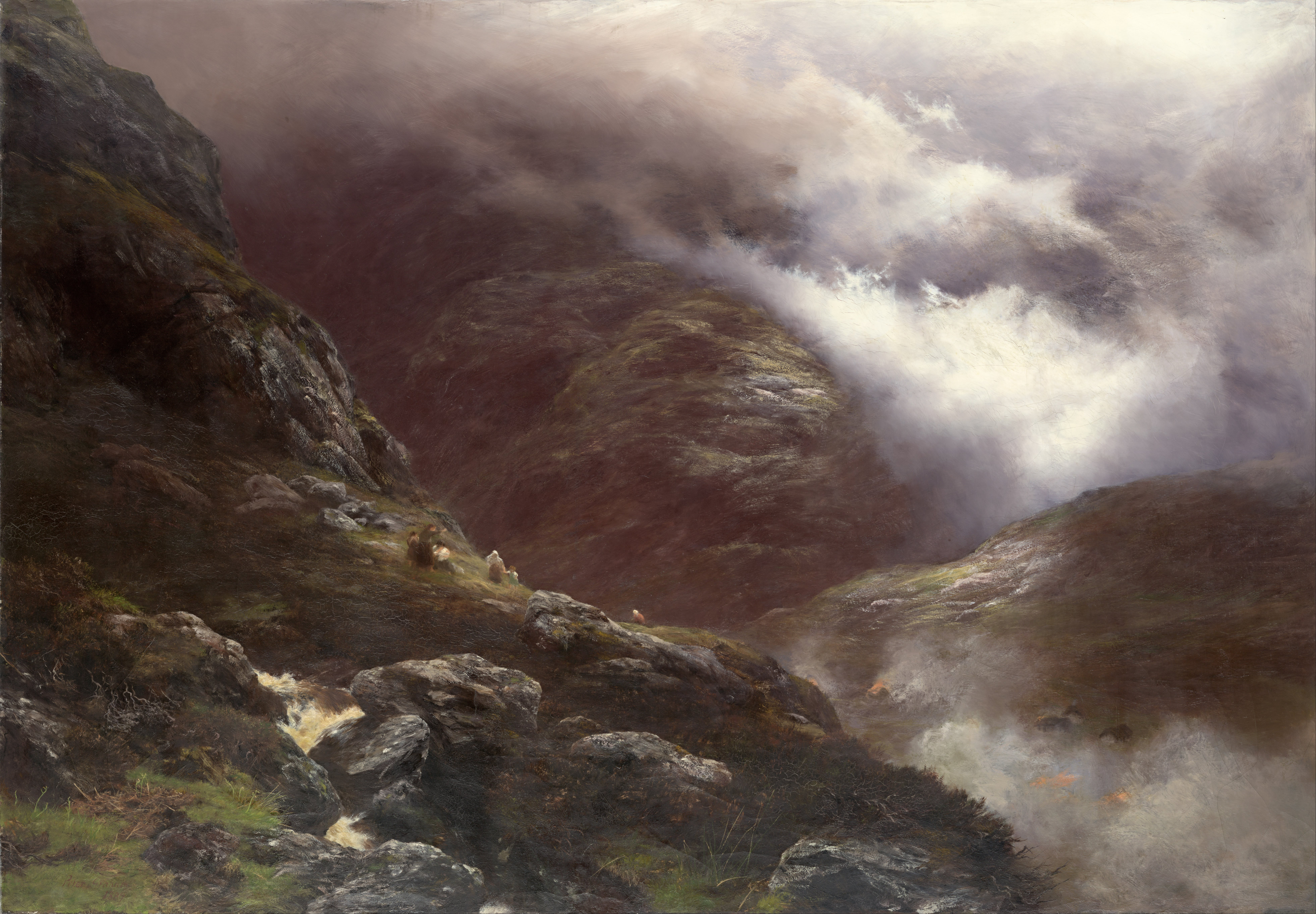
- After the Massacre of Glencoe by Peter Graham, 1889
- Location: Glen Coe, Argyll, Scotland
- Date: 13 February 1692
- Target: Clan MacDonald of Glencoe
- Deaths: About 30 killed
- Perpetrator: Earl of Argyll's Regiment of Foot

The Massacre of Glencoe (Note: Scottish Gaelic: Murt Ghlinne Comhann) took place in Glen Coe in the Argyll region of the Scottish Highlands on 13 February 1692. An estimated 30 members and associates of the Clan MacDonald of Glencoe were killed by Scottish government forces, allegedly for failing to pledge allegiance to the new monarchs, King William II/III and Queen Mary II.

Although the Jacobite rising of 1689 had largely been suppressed by May 1690, a continuing need to police the Highlands diverted military resources from the Nine Years' War in Flanders. In late 1690, clan leaders loyal to the exiled House of Stuart agreed to swear allegiance to William and Mary, in return for a cash payment of £12,000. However, disagreements over how to divide this meant by December 1691 none of the clans had taken the oath.

In response, Lord Stair, Scottish Secretary of State, decided to show the consequences of further delay. While others, including the Keppoch MacDonalds, also missed the deadline, the Glencoe MacDonalds appear to have been selected due to a combination of clan politics and a reputation for lawlessness.

While similar events were not unknown in earlier Scottish history, this was no longer the case by 1692, and the brutality of the massacre shocked contemporaries. It became a significant element in the persistence of Jacobitism in the Highlands during the first half of the 18th century, and remains a powerful symbol to this day.

== Background ==
Scottish Highlands: key locations mentioned in article

Some historians argue the late 17th-century Scottish Highlands were more peaceful than often suggested; the exception being Lochaber, identified as a refuge for cattle raiders and thieves by government officials, other chiefs and Gaelic poets. Much of this instability was blamed on the questionable legal status of lands ostensibly leased from Clan Mackintosh and occupied by Clan MacDonald of Keppoch, though the latter disputed this claim. Four Lochaber clans were consistently identified as prone to lawlessness, the Keppoch and Glencoe MacDonalds, the MacGregors, and Camerons.

Levies from all four served in the Independent Highland Companies used to suppress the Conventicles in 1678–80. They also took part in the raid led by the Marquess of Atholl that followed Argyll's Rising in 1685. Primarily directed against Lowland migrants settled in Cowal and Kintyre, the damage inflicted by Atholl's raid destabilised large parts of the central and southern Highlands. In September 1688, James VII and II outlawed the Keppoch MacDonalds, shortly before he was deposed by the November 1688 Glorious Revolution.

In March 1689, James landed in Ireland in an attempt to regain his kingdoms, with Camerons and Keppoch MacDonalds among those who joined Viscount Dundee for a supporting campaign in Scotland. Victory over a government army at Killiecrankie on 27 July cost the lives of Dundee and 600 Highlanders, while organised Jacobite military resistance largely ended after Cromdale in May 1690. However, the ongoing need to police the Highlands used resources needed for the Nine Years' War in Flanders, while close links between Western Scotland and Ulster meant unrest in one country often spilled into the other. Since peace in the Highlands required control of Lochaber, achieving this had wider strategic importance than might appear.

== Oath of allegiance to William and Mary ==
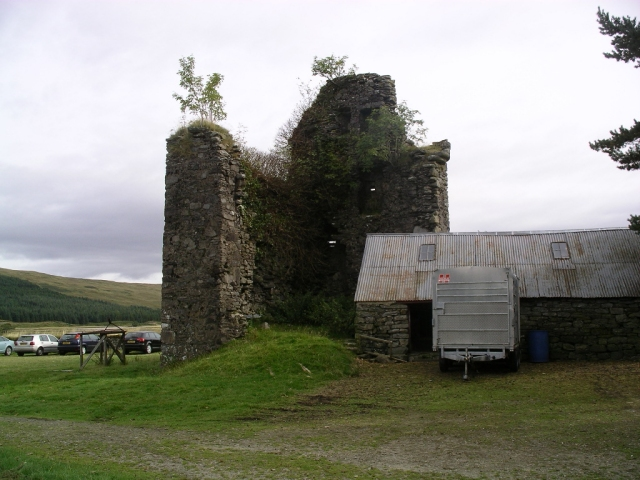
Ruins of Achallader Castle, site of the Declaration of June 1691

After Killiecrankie, the Scottish government tried to negotiate a settlement with the Jacobite chiefs, (Note: How far "Jacobite" implied loyalty to the House of Stuart, versus a desire to increase individual clan power, remains a matter of debate) terms varying based on events in Ireland and Scotland. In March 1690, Secretary of State Lord Stair offered to pay £12,000 in return for their agreement to take an oath of allegiance to William and Mary. The chiefs agreed to do so in the June 1691 Declaration of Achallader, with John Campbell, Earl of Breadalbane, signing for the government. Crucially, it did not specify how the money was to be divided, and disputes over this delayed the oath. In addition, Breadalbane argued part of it was owed him as compensation for damage done to his estates by the Glencoe MacDonalds.

The Battle of Aughrim on 12 July ended Jacobite chances of victory in the Williamite War in Ireland, and any immediate prospects of a Stuart restoration. On 26 August, the Scottish government issued a Royal Proclamation that offered a pardon to anyone taking the oath prior to 1 January 1692, with severe reprisals for those who did not. Two days later, secret articles began circulating which cancelled the Achallader agreement in the event of a Jacobite invasion. These were allegedly signed by all the attendees, including Breadalbane, who claimed they had been manufactured by the MacDonald chief Glengarry. Stair's letters now focused on enforcement, reflecting his belief that forged or not, none of the signatories intended to keep their word.

In early October, the Jacobite chiefs asked the exiled James VII for permission to take the oath unless he could mount an invasion before the deadline, a condition they knew was impossible. A document granting his approval was sent from Saint-Germain on 12 December and received by Glengarry on 23 December, who did not share it until 28th. While his reasons for the delay are unclear, one suggestion attributes it to an internal power struggle between Episcopalian MacDonalds like Glencoe, and the Catholic minority headed by Glengarry.

As a result, it was not until 30 December that MacIain of Glencoe left for Fort William to take the oath from its commander, Lieutenant Colonel John Hill. Since he was not authorised to accept it, Hill sent MacIain to Inveraray with a letter for Sir Colin Campbell, the local magistrate. He administered the oath on 6 January, after which MacIain returned home.

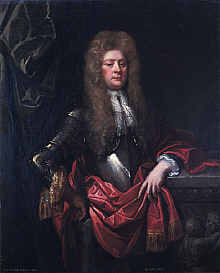
Lord Stair, Secretary of State for Scotland

Glengarry himself did not take the oath until 4 February, while others did so by proxy, but only MacIain was excluded from the indemnity issued by the Scottish Privy Council. Stair's letter of 2 December to Breadalbane shows the decision to make him an example was taken well before the deadline for the oath, originally as a much bigger operation; "...the clan Donell must be rooted out and Lochiel. Leave the McLeans to Argyll..."

In January, Stair wrote three letters in quick succession to Sir Thomas Livingstone, military commander in Scotland; on the 7th, the intention was to "....destroy entirely the country of Lochaber, Locheal's lands, Kippochs, Glengarrie and Glenco..."; on the 9th, "...their chieftains all being papists, it is well the vengeance falls there; for my part, I regret the MacDonalds had not divided and...Kippoch and Glenco are safe." The last, on 11 January, states, "...my lord Argile tells me Glenco hath not taken the oaths at which I rejoice...."

The Scottish Parliament passed a Decree of Forfeiture in 1690, depriving Glengarry of his lands, but he continued to hold Invergarry Castle, whose garrison included the senior Jacobite officers Alexander Cannon and Thomas Buchan. This suggests the Episcopalian Glencoe MacDonalds only replaced the Catholic Glengarry as the target on 11 January; MacIain's son John MacDonald told the 1695 Commission the soldiers came to Glencoe from the north "...Glengarry's house being reduced".

The targeting of the Glencoe MacDonalds appears to have been driven by a variety of factors. After two years of negotiations, Stair was under pressure to ensure the deal stuck, while Argyll was competing for political influence with his kinsman Breadalbane, who also found it expedient to concur with the plan. Glengarry managed to eliminate an internal rival, was pardoned and had his lands returned by the Williamite government, while enhancing his reputation with the exiled court in Saint-Germain by being the last to swear.

== Massacre ==
In late January 1692, approximately 120 men from the Earl of Argyll's Regiment of Foot arrived in Glencoe. Their commander was Robert Campbell of Glenlyon, an impoverished local landowner whose niece was married to one of MacIain's sons. (Note: John MacDonald, who along with his brother Alistair served in the Jacobite defeat at Cromdale in May 1690) Campbell carried orders for 'free quarter', an established alternative to paying taxes in what was a largely non-cash society. The Glencoe MacDonalds had themselves been similarly billeted on the Campbells when serving with the Highland levies used to police Argyll in 1678.

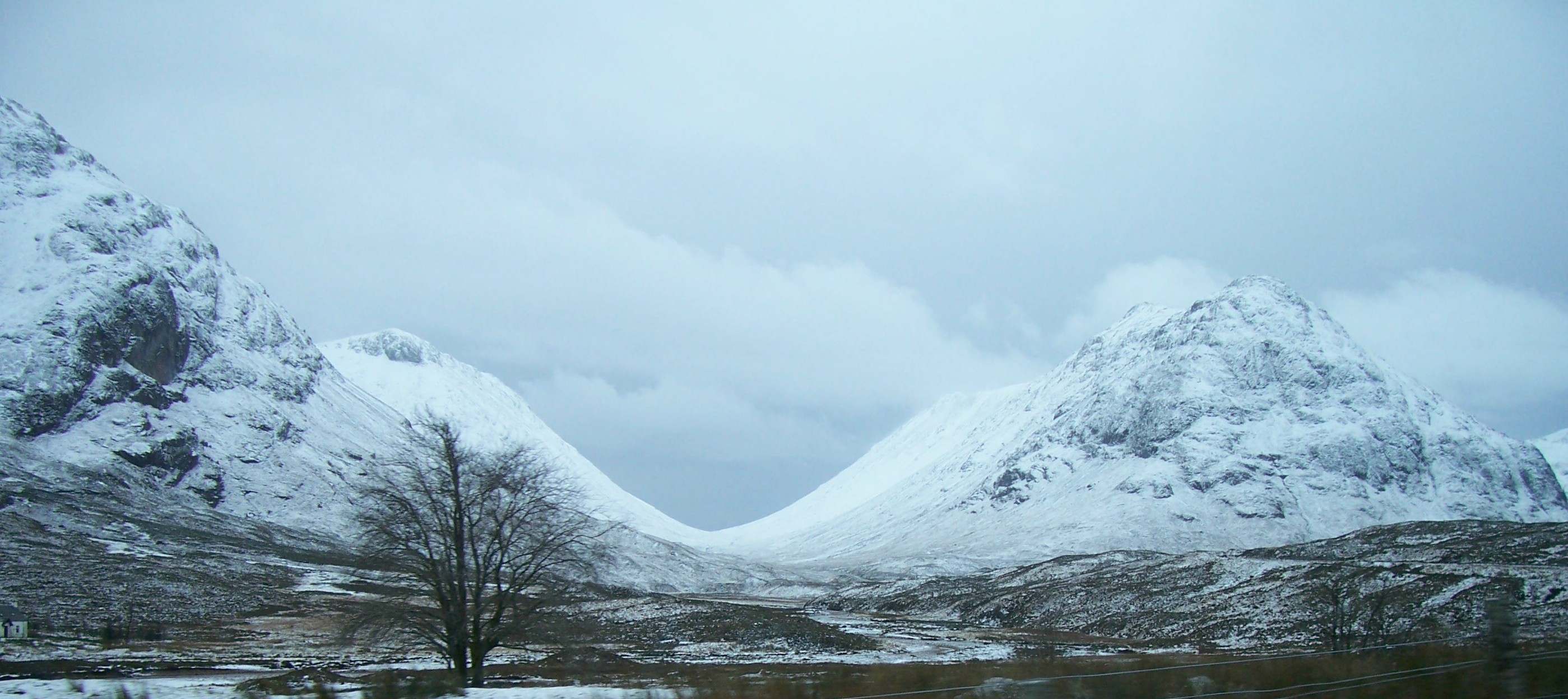
Glencoe in winter; conditions would have been similar at the time of the Massacre.

On 12 February, Hill ordered Lieutenant Colonel James Hamilton to take 400 men and block the northern exits from Glencoe at Kinlochleven. Meanwhile, another 400 men under Major Duncanson would join Glenlyon and sweep northwards up the glen, killing anyone they found, removing property and burning houses. Later that evening, Glenlyon received orders from Duncanson carried by Thomas Drummond, who commanded the Argylls' Grenadier company and was thus Glenlyon's superior. His presence appears to have been to ensure the orders were enforced, since witnesses later claimed he shot two people who asked Glenlyon for mercy.

In letters written on 30 January to Hamilton and Hill, Stair expresses concern that the MacDonalds would escape if warned, and emphasises the need for secrecy. This correlates with evidence from James Campbell, one of Glenlyon's company, stating that they had no knowledge of the plan until the morning of 13 February. MacIain was killed, although his two sons escaped, and the 1695 Commission was given various figures for the number of casualties. The often-quoted figure of 38 dead was provided by Hamilton's men, who were at the opposite end of the glen from where the killing took place, (Note: As below, none of the Argyll regiment were in Scotland when the Commission heard evidence in 1695) while the MacDonalds themselves claimed "the number they knew to be slaine were about 25". Modern research estimates deaths resulting from the Massacre as "around 30", while claims others died of exposure cannot be substantiated.

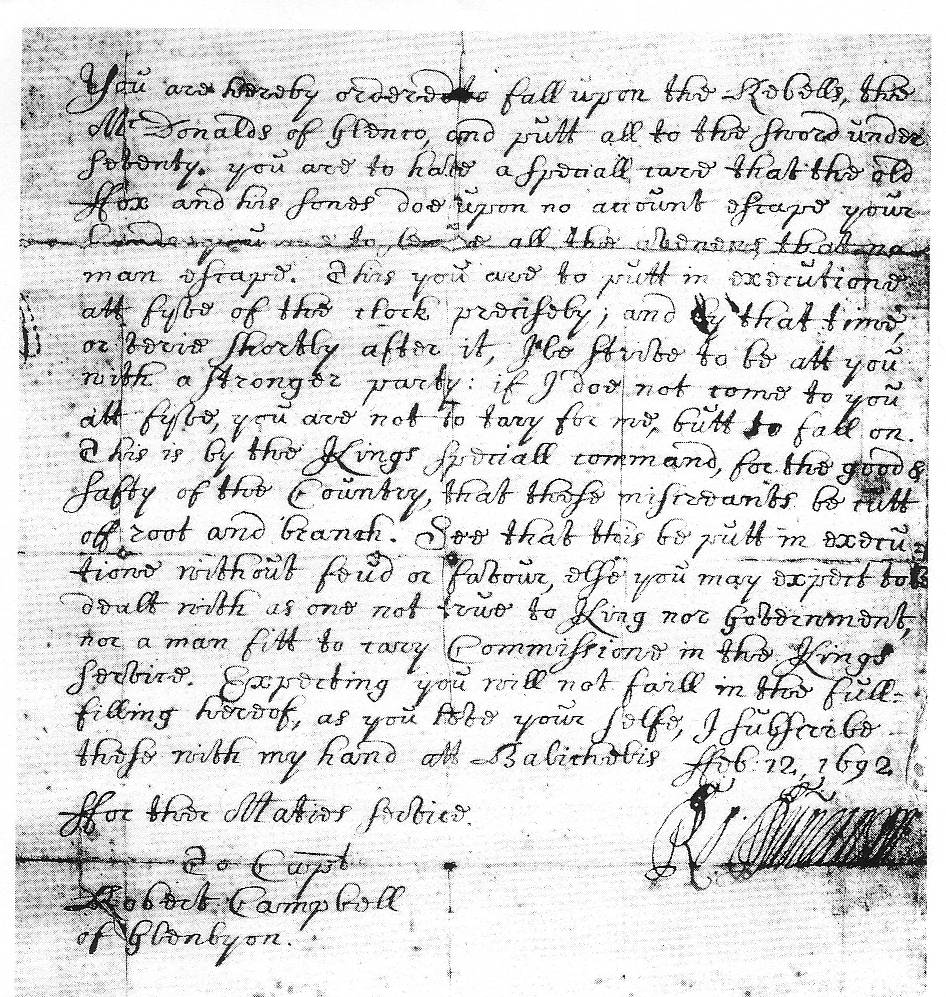
Duncanson's written orders to Glenlyon (Note: You are hereby ordered to fall upon the rebells, the McDonalds of Glenco, and put all to the sword under seventy. you are to have a speciall care that the old Fox and his sones doe upon no account escape your hands, you are to secure all the avenues that no man escape. This you are to putt in execution att fyve of the clock precisely; and by that time, or very shortly after it, I’ll strive to be att you with a stronger party: if I doe not come to you att fyve, you are not to tarry for me, but to fall on. This is by the Kings speciall command, for the good & safety of the Country, that these miscreants be cutt off root and branch. See that this be putt in execution without feud or favour, else you may expect to be dealt with as one not true to King nor Government, nor a man fitt to carry Commissione in the Kings service. Expecting you will not faill in the full-filling hereof, as you love your selfe, I subscribe these with my hand att Balicholis Feb: 12, 1692.)

Since he arrived two hours late at 7:00 am, Duncanson joined Glenlyon only after most of the killings had been carried out, then advanced up the glen burning houses and removing livestock. Hamilton was not in position at Kinlochleven until 11:00; his detachment included two lieutenants, Francis Farquhar and Gilbert Kennedy, who often appear in anecdotes claiming they "broke their swords rather than carry out their orders." This differs from their testimony to the Commission and is unlikely since they arrived hours after the killings, which were carried out at the opposite end of the glen.

In May, fears of a French invasion meant the Argylls were posted to Brentford in England, then Flanders, where they served until the end of the Nine Years' War in 1697 when the regiment was disbanded. No action was taken against those involved; Glenlyon died in Bruges in August 1696, Duncanson was killed in Spain in May 1705, while Drummond survived to take part in another famous Scottish disaster, the Darien scheme.

== Investigation ==
On 12 April 1692, the Paris Gazette published a copy of Glenlyon's orders, allegedly found in an Edinburgh tavern and taken to France. Despite criticism of the government, there was little sympathy for the MacDonalds, Livingstone writing it's not that anyone thinks the thieving tribe did not deserve to be destroyed, but that it should have been done by those quartered amongst them makes a great noise. The motivation for investigating the affair was largely political; having served in the old and new regimes, Stair was unpopular with supporters of both.

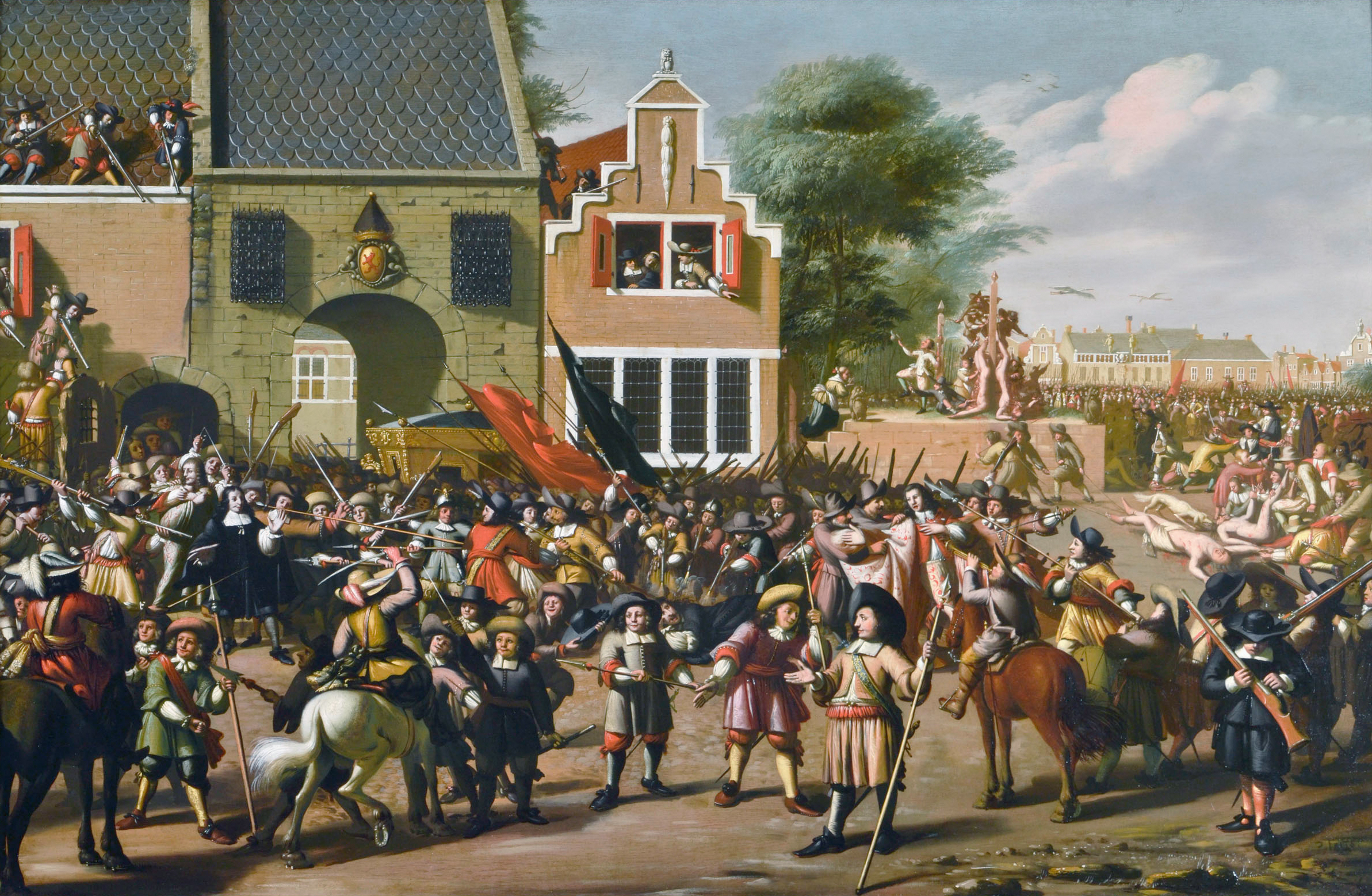
The killing of the De Witt brothers, 1672; the Massacre was first mentioned in a broadsheet accusing William of their murder.

In the debate that followed, Colonel Hill claimed most Highlanders were peaceful, and even in Lochaber, a single person may travell safley where he will witout harme. He argued lawlessness was deliberately encouraged by leaders like Glengarry, while the midle sort of Gentrey and Commons....never got anything but hurt from it. The 1693 Highland Judicial Commission encouraged using the law to resolve issues like cattle theft, but the clan chiefs opposed it as reducing control over their tenants.

The issue appeared settled until the English Licensing of the Press Act 1662 expired in May 1695. The result was a huge increase in the number of political pamphlets published in London, among them Gallienus Redivivus, or Murther will out, &c. Being a true Account of the De Witting of Glencoe, Gaffney. Written by Jacobite activist Charles Leslie, it focused on William's alleged complicity in the 1672 death of Johan de Witt, with Glencoe and other crimes as secondary charges.

A Commission was set up to determine whether there was a case to answer under 'Slaughter under trust', a Scottish act introduced in 1587 to reduce endemic feuding. The law applied to murder committed in "cold blood", when articles of surrender had been agreed, or hospitality accepted. It was first used in 1588 against Lachlan Mor Maclean, whose objections to his mother's second marriage led him to murder his new stepfather, John MacDonald, and 18 members of the wedding party. Interpretation varied, such as in the cases of James MacDonald, who locked his parents in their house before setting it on fire in 1597, and the killing of prisoners after the 1647 Battle of Dunaverty. Both were deemed to have been committed in "hot blood", and thus excluded.

As a capital offence and treason, it was an awkward weapon with which to attack Stair, since William himself signed the orders, and the intent was widely known in government circles. The Commission instead considered whether participants had exceeded orders, not their legality, and concluded Stair and Hamilton had a case to answer, but left the decision to William. While Stair was dismissed as Secretary of State, he returned to government in 1700 and was made an earl by the last Stuart monarch, Queen Anne. An application by the survivors for compensation was ignored; they rebuilt their houses, and participated in the 1715 and 1745 Jacobite risings. An archaeological survey in 2019 showed Glencoe was occupied until the Highland Clearances of the mid-18th century.

== Aftermath and legacy ==
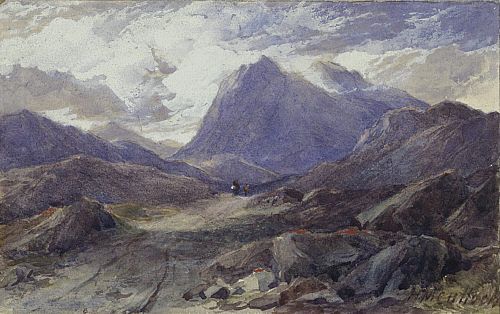
Glencoe, by Horatio McCulloch, 1864. Glencoe was depopulated in the 18th century by the Highland Clearances; McCulloch shows it as the remote and empty landscape it remains today.

The brutality of the Massacre shocked Scottish society and became a Jacobite symbol of post-1688 oppression. During the Jacobite rising of 1745, Charles Edward Stuart ordered Leslie's pamphlet and the 1695 Parliamentary minutes to be reprinted in the Caledonian Mercury. Glencoe then largely disappeared from public knowledge until it was referenced by historian Thomas Macaulay in his 1850 History of England. He sought to exonerate William from every one of Leslie's charges, and is the origin of the claim that the Massacre was simply part of an ongoing feud between the MacDonalds and Clan Campbell.

Victorian era Scotland developed values that were both Unionist and Imperialist, while also being uniquely Scottish. Historical divisions meant this was largely expressed through a shared cultural identity, while the teaching of Scottish, rather than British history, virtually disappeared from universities. One modern historian suggests this meant that instead of being analysed as an historical event, Glencoe was incorporated into "the emotional trappings of the Scottish past...bonnie Scotland of the bens, glens and misty shieling, the Jacobites, Mary, Queen of Scots, tartan mania and the raising of historical statuary."

Even when the study of Scottish history re-emerged in the 1950s, Leslie's writings continued to shape views of William's reign as disastrous for Scotland. The Massacre became one of several incidents used to illustrate this perspective, others including the Darien scheme, the famine of the late 1690s, and the 1707 Union.

The Massacre is still commemorated in an annual ceremony by the Clan Donald Society. Initiated in 1930, this is held at the Upper Carnoch memorial, a tapering Celtic cross installed in 1883 at the eastern end of Glencoe village. Another memorial includes the Henderson Stone, a granite boulder south of Carnach, originally known as the "Soldier's Stone". In the late 19th century, it was renamed Clach Eanruig, or "Henry's Stone", after the man reputed to be Piper to MacIain.

Since 1925, Duncanson's letter to Glenlyon, ordering him to "fall on the Macdonalds of Glencoe and destroy them", has been in the possession of the National Library of Scotland in Edinburgh.

== In popular culture ==
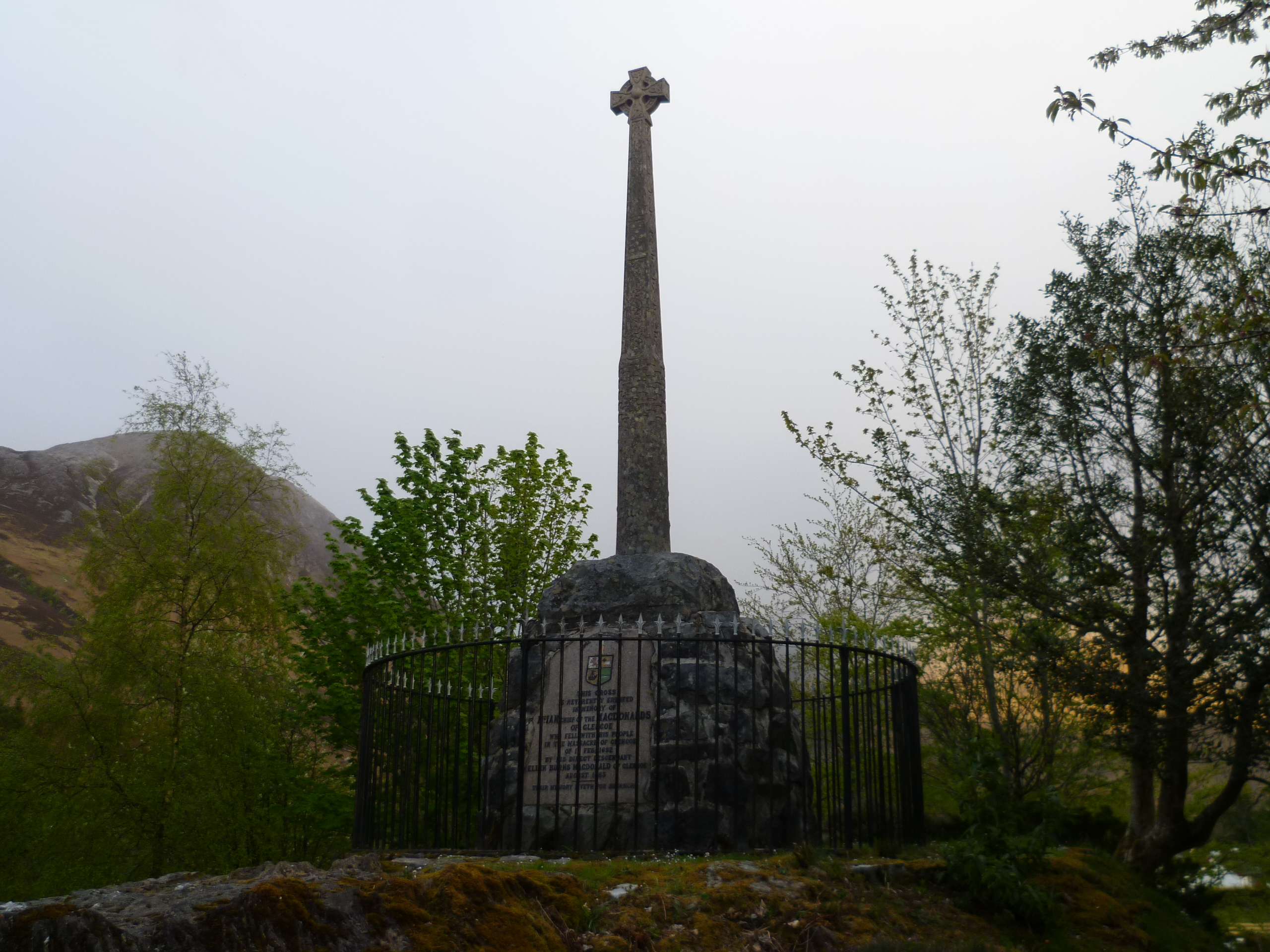
Glencoe Massacre Memorial

Glencoe was a popular topic with 19th-century poets, notably Sir Walter Scott's "Massacre of Glencoe". It was used as a subject by Thomas Campbell and George Gilfillan, as well as by Letitia Elizabeth Landon in her 1823 work "Glencoe", T. S. Eliot's "Rannoch, by Glencoe" and "Two Poems from Glencoe" by Douglas Stewart.

The massacre is alluded to in Beethoven's 25 Irish songs, WoO 152.

Examples in literature include "The Masks of Purpose" by Eric Linklater, and the novels Fire Bringer by David Clement-Davies, Corrag (known as Witch Light in paperback) by Susan Fletcher and Lady of the Glen by Jennifer Roberson. William Croft Dickinson references Glencoe in his 1963 short story "The Return of the Native". A Song of Ice and Fire author, George R. R. Martin, cites the Glencoe Massacre and the Black Dinner as his two historical inspirations for the infamous Red Wedding in his 2000 book A Storm of Swords.

In 1962, Jim McLean wrote the song "The Massacre of Glencoe", which was published under Duart Music. The song was later adapted and performed by The Corries, as well as adapted for the Highland Bagpipes by various artists. In 1972 the Scottish band Nazareth released the song "1692 (Glencoe Massacre)" on their album, Exercises.

In the eleventh episode of Mad Men's seventh season, Pete Campbell's daughter is refused admission into Greenwich Country Day School directly by the headmaster, a MacDonald, over Clan Campbell's role in the massacre.

The event is the namesake to the traditional Piobaireachd "Massacre of Glencoe". The original author is unknown, however numerous settings exist, the most common source being Donald MacDonald's.

== Recent archaeological work ==
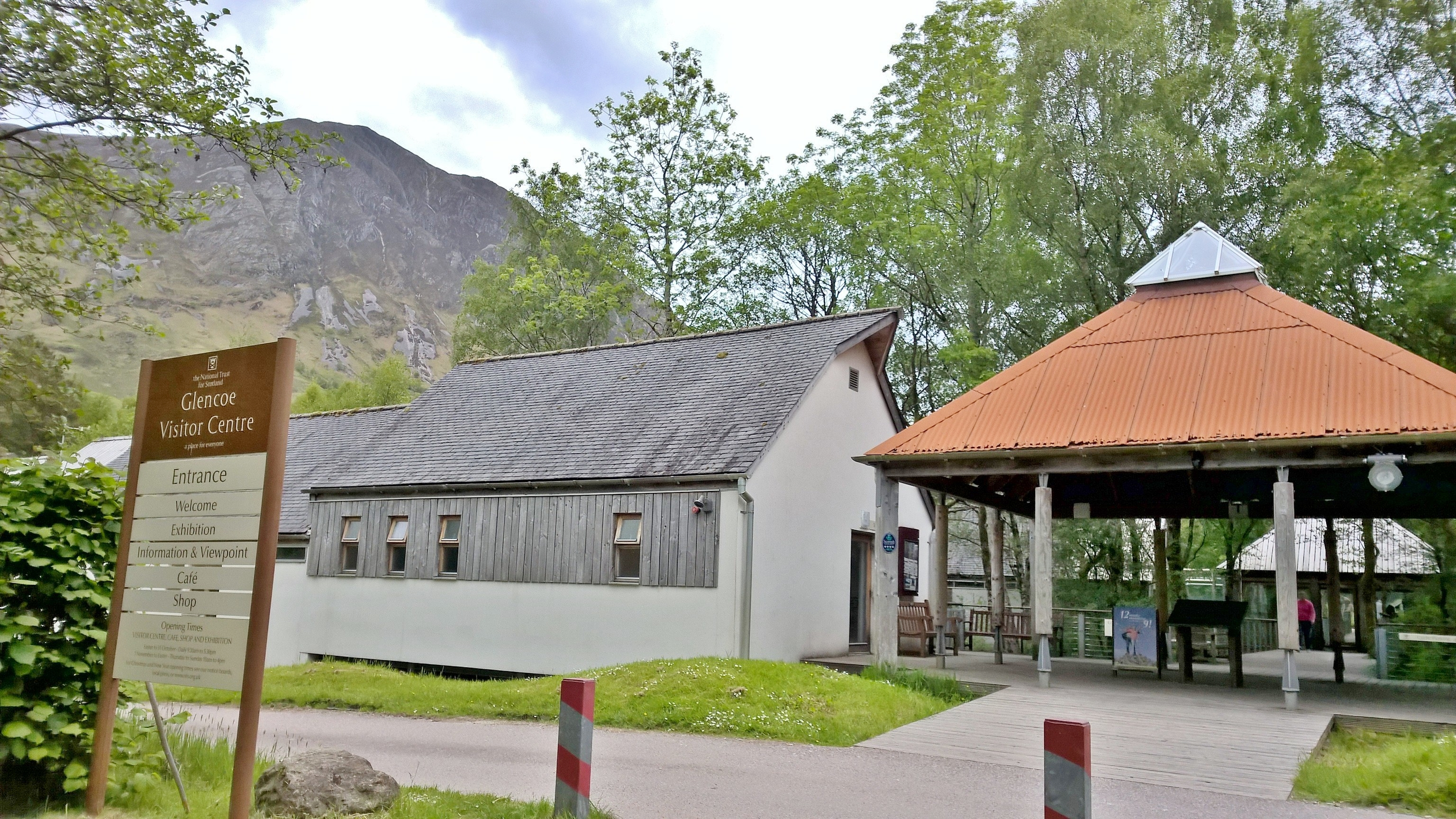
Glencoe Visitor Centre

After the Massacre, the Glencoe MacDonalds rebuilt their homes; a military survey undertaken between 1747 and 1755 shows seven separate settlements along the glen, each containing between six and eleven buildings. In 2018, a team of archaeologists organised by the National Trust for Scotland began surveying several areas related to the massacre, with plans to produce detailed studies of their findings.

Work in the summer of 2019 focused on the settlement of Achadh Triachatain, or Achtriachtan, at the extreme end of the glen; home to an estimated 50 people, excavations show it was rebuilt after 1692 and still occupied in the mid-18th century. A hoard of coins was found in a house linked to MacIain in August 2023, which archaeologists believe may have been hidden there by a victim of the Massacre.

In 2021, a full-size reconstruction of one of the buildings excavated at Achtriachtan was created using traditional techniques and materials at the National Trust for Scotland Visitor Centre.

== Sources ==
- Argyll Transcripts, ICA (1891). "An Account of the depredations committed on the Clan Campbell and their followers during the years 1685 and 1686". Historical Manuscripts Commission.
- Ash, Marinell (1980). "The Strange Death of Scottish History". The Scottish Historical Review. 76 (201). JSTOR 25530740.
- Buchan, John (1933). Massacre of Glencoe (1990 ed.). Lang Syne Publishers Ltd. ISBN 1-85217-164-2.
- Campsie, Alison. "Archaeologists trace lost settlements of Glencoe destroyed after 1692 massacre". The Scotsman.
- Cobbett, William (1814). Cobbett's Complete Collection Of State Trials And Proceedings For High Treason And Other Crimes And Misdemeanors. Nabu Press. ISBN 1-175-88244-5.
- Donaldson, M. (1876). Wanderings in the Western Highlands and Islands : Recounting Highland & Clan History, Traditions, Ecclesiology, Archaeology, Romance, Literature, Humour, Folk-Lore, Etc (1923 ed.). Paisley.
- Dorson, Richard (1971). "Sources for the Traditional History of the Scottish Highlands and Western Islands". Journal of the Folklore Institute. 8 (2): 147–184. doi:10.2307/3814103. JSTOR 3814103.
- Firth, Charles Harding (1918). "Macaulay's Treatment of Scottish History". The Scottish Historical Review. 15 (60): 273–291. JSTOR 25519104.
- Frank, William (1983). Charles Leslie and Theological Politics in Post-Revolutionary England (PHD). University of McMaster.
- Gordon, John (1845). Papers Illustrative of the Political Condition of the Highlands of Scotland, 1689–1706 (2015 ed.). Sagwan Press. ISBN 978-1-340-25271-7.
- Goring, Rosemary (2014). Scotland: The Autobiography: 2,000 Years of Scottish History by Those Who Saw it Happen. Penguin. ISBN 978-0-241-96916-8.
- Harris, Tim (2015). Rebellion: Britain's First Stuart Kings, 1567–1642. OUP Oxford. ISBN 978-0-19-874311-8.
- Harris, Tim (2007). Revolution: The Great Crisis of the British Monarchy 1685-1720. Penguin. ISBN 978-0-14-101652-8.
- Hopkins, Paul (1998). Glencoe and the end of the Highland Wars. John Donald Publishers Ltd. ISBN 0-85976-490-7.
- Howell, Thomas Bayly (2017). A Complete Collection of State Trials and Proceedings for High Treason. Forgotten Books. ISBN 978-1-333-01932-7.
- Kennedy, Allan (2017). "Managing the Early Modern Periphery: Highland Policy and the Highland Judicial Commission, c. 1692–c. 1705". The Scottish Historical Review. 96: 32–60. doi:10.3366/shr.2017.0313. S2CID 262645526.
- Kennedy, Allan (2014). Governing Gaeldom: The Scottish Highlands and the Restoration State 1660–1688. Brill. ISBN 978-90-04-24837-3.
- Kidd, Colin (1997). "The Strange Death of Scottish History Revisited; Constructions of the Past in Scotland c1790-1914". Scottish Historical Review. lxxvi (100): 86–102. doi:10.3366/shr.1997.76.1.86. JSTOR 25530740.;
- Lang, Andrew (1912). The History Of Scotland: Volume 3: From the early 17th century to the death of Dundee (2016 ed.). Jazzybee Verlag. ISBN 978-3-8496-8564-5.
- Lenman, Bruce (1980). The Jacobite Risings in Britain 1689–1746. Methuen Publishing Ltd. ISBN 978-0-413-39650-1.
- Lenman, Bruce; Mackie, JL (1991). A History of Scotland. Penguin. ISBN 0-14-013649-5.
- Leslie, Charles; Gallienus Redivivus, or Murther will out, &c. Being a true Account of the De Witting of Glencoe, (Gaffney, 1695);
- Levine, Mark (1999). The Massacre in History (War and Genocide). Bergahn Books. ISBN 1-57181-935-5.
- Macaulay, Thomas Babington (1859). The History of England from the Accession of James II, Volume IV.
- MacConechy, James (1843). Papers Illustrative of the Political Condition of the Highlands of Scotland (2012 ed.). Nabu Press. ISBN 1-145-17438-8.;
- MacDonald, Kenneth. "The dig uncovering Glencoe's dark secrets".
- MacInnes, Allan (1986). "Repression and Conciliation: The Highland Dimension 1660–1688". The Scottish Historical Review. 65 (180): 167–195. JSTOR 25530202.
- Morris, R. J. (1992). "Victorian Values in Scotland & England". In Smout, T. C. (ed.). Victorian Values. Proceedings of the British Academy. Vol. 78. ISBN 978-0-19-726119-4.
- Pagan, Sue. "Henderson Stone dedicated at Glencoe". Archived from the original on 9 November 2019.
- Prebble, John (1973). Glencoe: The Story of the Massacre. Penguin. ISBN 0-14-002897-8.
- Prebble, John (1968). Darien: the Scottish Dream of Empire (2002 ed.). Pimlico. ISBN 978-0-7126-6853-8.
- Prebble, John (1967). "Religion and the Massacre of Glencoe". Scottish Historical Review. 46 (142): 185–188. JSTOR 25528722.
- Scott, Sir Walter. "On the Massacre of Glencoe". Bartleby.com.
- Somers, John (1843). A Collection Of Scarce And Valuable Tracts, On The Most Interesting And Entertaining Subjects: Reign Of King James II. Reign Of King William III (2014 ed.). Nabu Press. ISBN 978-1-293-84222-5.
- Szechi, Daniel (1994). The Jacobites: Britain and Europe, 1688–1788. Manchester University Press. ISBN 0-7190-3774-3.
- Treviño, Julissa. "Archaeologists Trace 'Lost Settlements' of 1692 Glencoe Massacre".
