= 25 Irish Songs, WoO 152 (Beethoven) =

Compositions by Ludwig van Beethoven

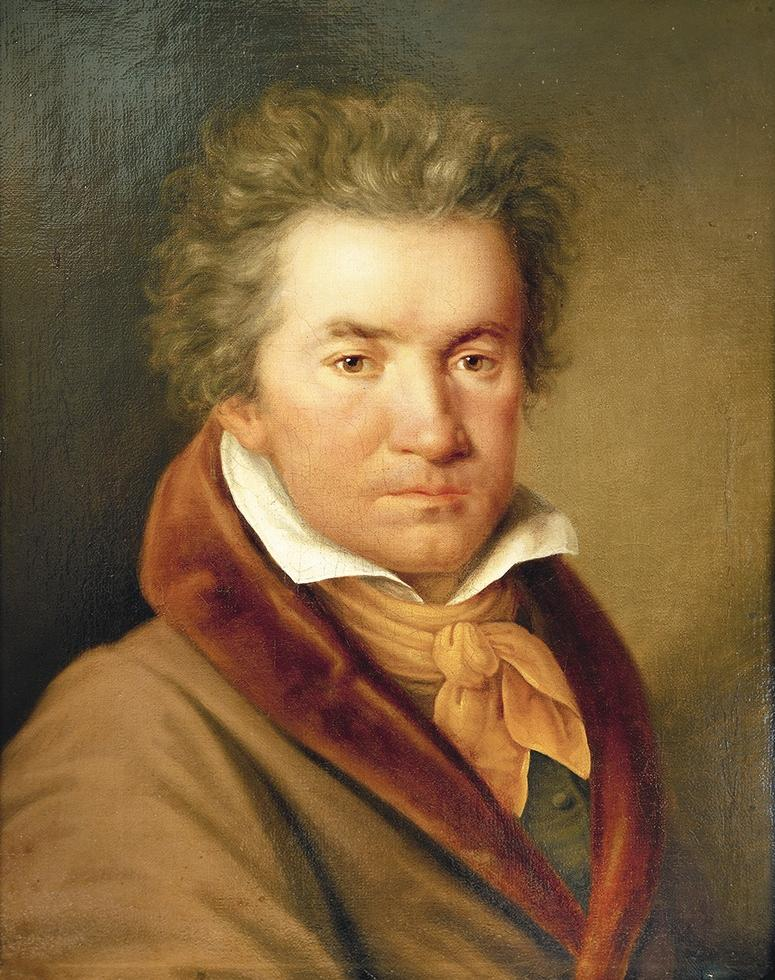
Ludwig van Beethoven (age 44) depicted in a portrait by Joseph Willibrord Mähler (1815)

25 Irish Songs (WoO 152) were composed by Ludwig van Beethoven. The folk song collector George Thomson commissioned Beethoven to arrange a series of folk melodies that he had collected. The songs were composed between the years 1810 and 1813. After Beethoven arranged the melodies Thomson added the lyrics as his original choice to write the lyrics, the Irish poet Thomas Moore, turned him down. They were published in 1814 in A Select Collection of Original Irish Airs and later reissued in Thomson's Select Melodies of Scotland, Ireland and Wales. Barry Cooper said of Beethoven's Irish folk song arrangements that they have ‘a kind of sophisticated artlessness that no ordinary composer could achieve’.

The songs in order are:

1. The Return to Ulster, by Walter Scott (F minor)
2. Sweet power of song, by Joanna Baillie (D major)
3. Once more I hail thee, Robert Burns (F major)
4. The morning air plays on my face, by Joanna Baillie (G minor)
5. Massacre of Glencoe, by Walter Scott (A minor)
6. What shall I do to shew how much I love her?, by anon. (B minor)
7. His boat comes on the sunny tide, by Joanna Baillie (D major)
8. Come draw we round a cheerful ring, by Joanna Baillie (D minor)
9. The Soldier's Dream, by Thomas Campbell (E♭ major)
10. The Deserter, by John Philpot Curran (F major)
11. Thou emblem of faith, by John Philpot Curran (C minor)
12. English Bulls, by anon. (D major)
13. Musing on the roaring ocean, by Robert Burns (C major)
14. Dermot and Shelah, by T. Toms (G major)
15. Let brain-spinning swain, by Alexander Boswell (A major)
16. Hide not thy anguish, by William Smyth (D major)
17. In vain to this desert, by Anne Grant and Robert Burns (D major)
18. They bid me slight my Dermot dear, by William Smyth (F major)
19. Wife, Children and Friends (A minor)
20. Farewell bliss and farewell Nancy, by Anne Grant (D minor)
21. Morning a cruel turmoiler is, by Alexander Boswell, by Samuel Friedrich Sauter (D major)
22. From Garyone, my happy home, by T. Toms (D major)
23. A wand'ring gypsy, Sirs, am I (F major)
24. The Traugh Welcome (F major)
25. Oh harp of Erin, by David Thomson (E♭ major)
