= After the Massacre of Glencoe =

Painting by Peter Graham

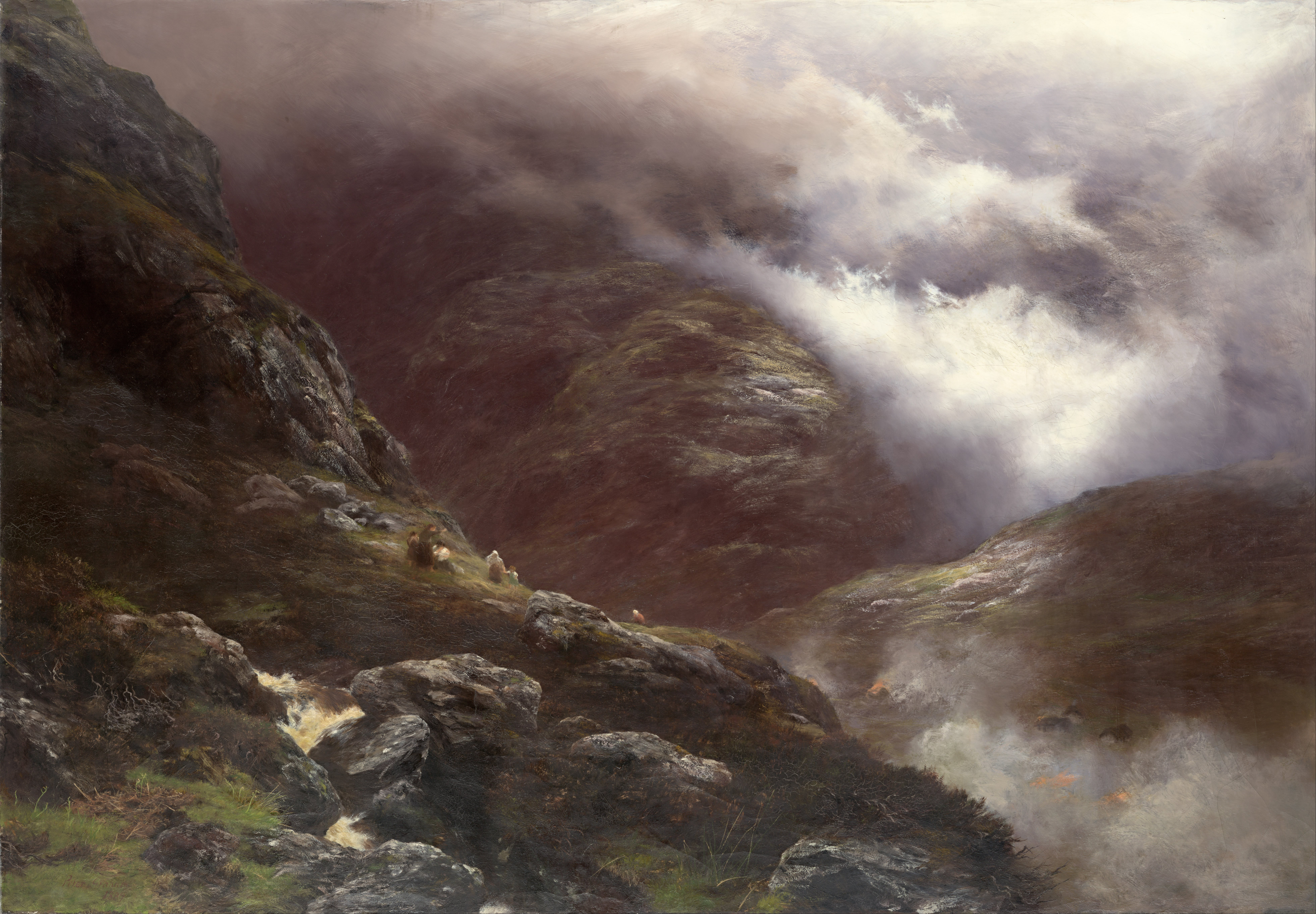
- Artist: Peter Graham
- Year: 1889
- Type: Oil on canvas, landscape painting
- Dimensions: 123.2 cm × 175.8 cm (48.5 in × 69.2 in)
- Location: National Gallery of Victoria, Melbourne

After the Massacre of Glencoe is an 1889 oil painting by the British artist Peter Graham. Combining landscape and history painting, it depicts the aftermath of the Massacre of Glencoe that took place on 13 February 1692 when members of Clan MacDonald, Jacobite supporters of the exiled King James, were killed by soldiers of the Argyll's Regiment. The painting shows a handful of survivors amidst the wild, open hilltops. Graham was noted for his Romantic scenes of the Scottish Highlands and was elected a member of the Royal Academy. The painting was acquired by the National Gallery of Victoria in Melbourne the same year.

== Bibliography ==
- Gott, Ted & Benson, Laurie. 19th Century Painting and Sculpture in the International Collections of the National Gallery of Victoria. National Gallery of Victoria, 2003.
- Mingay, G.E. (ed)The Victorian Countryside: Volume 1. Routledge, 2000.
- Potter, Matthew C. British Art for Australia, 1860–1953: The Acquisition of Artworks from the United Kingdom by Australian National Galleries. Routledge, 2018.
