= A Spate in the Highlands =

Painting by Peter Graham

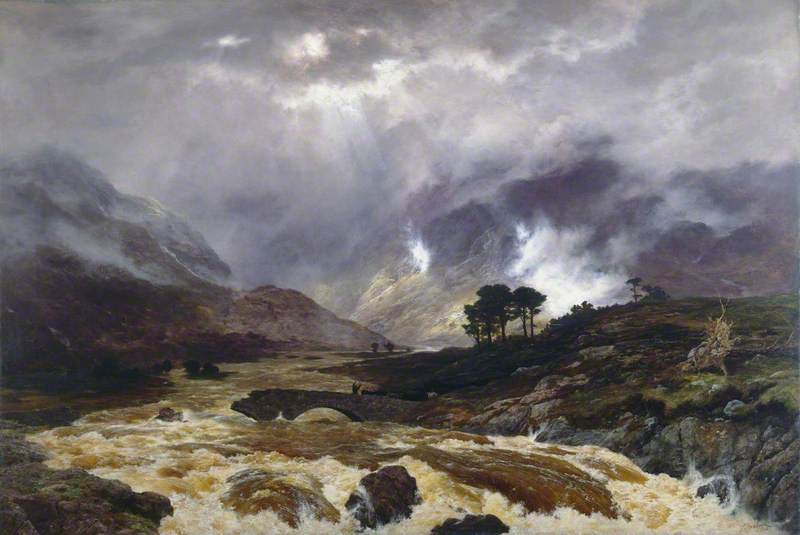
- Artist: Peter Graham
- Year: 1866
- Type: Oil on canvas, landscape painting
- Dimensions: 120 cm × 176.8 cm (47 in × 69.6 in)
- Location: Manchester Art Gallery, Manchester

A Spate in the Highlands is an 1866 landscape painting by the British artist Peter Graham. Distinctly Romantic in style it shows a view in the Scottish Highlands with a river swollen by added water tumbling down the hillside amidst swirling mists. The force of the spate has knocked out a stone bridge.

The painting was displayed at the Royal Academy Exhibition of 1866 held at the National Gallery in London where it was a major critical success. This was his debut at the Royal Academy of which he was later elected a member. It emphasises the Sublime and shows a similar interest in the forces of nature as Turner had. Today the picture is part of the collection of Manchester Art Gallery having been bequeathed by William Cunliffe Brooks in 1901.

== Bibliography ==
- Mingay, G.E. (ed)The Victorian Countryside: Volume 1. Routledge, 2000.
- Morrison, John. Painting the Nation: Identity and Nationalism in Scottish Painting, 1800-1920. Edinburgh University Press, 2003.
- Spoor, Freya (ed.) Scottish Art in the Industrial Age, 1800-1914: Volume II. Routledge, 2005.
