= John Campbell, 2nd Duke of Argyll =

British army officer and politician (1680–1743)

Field Marshal His Grace The Duke of Argyll KG KT PC
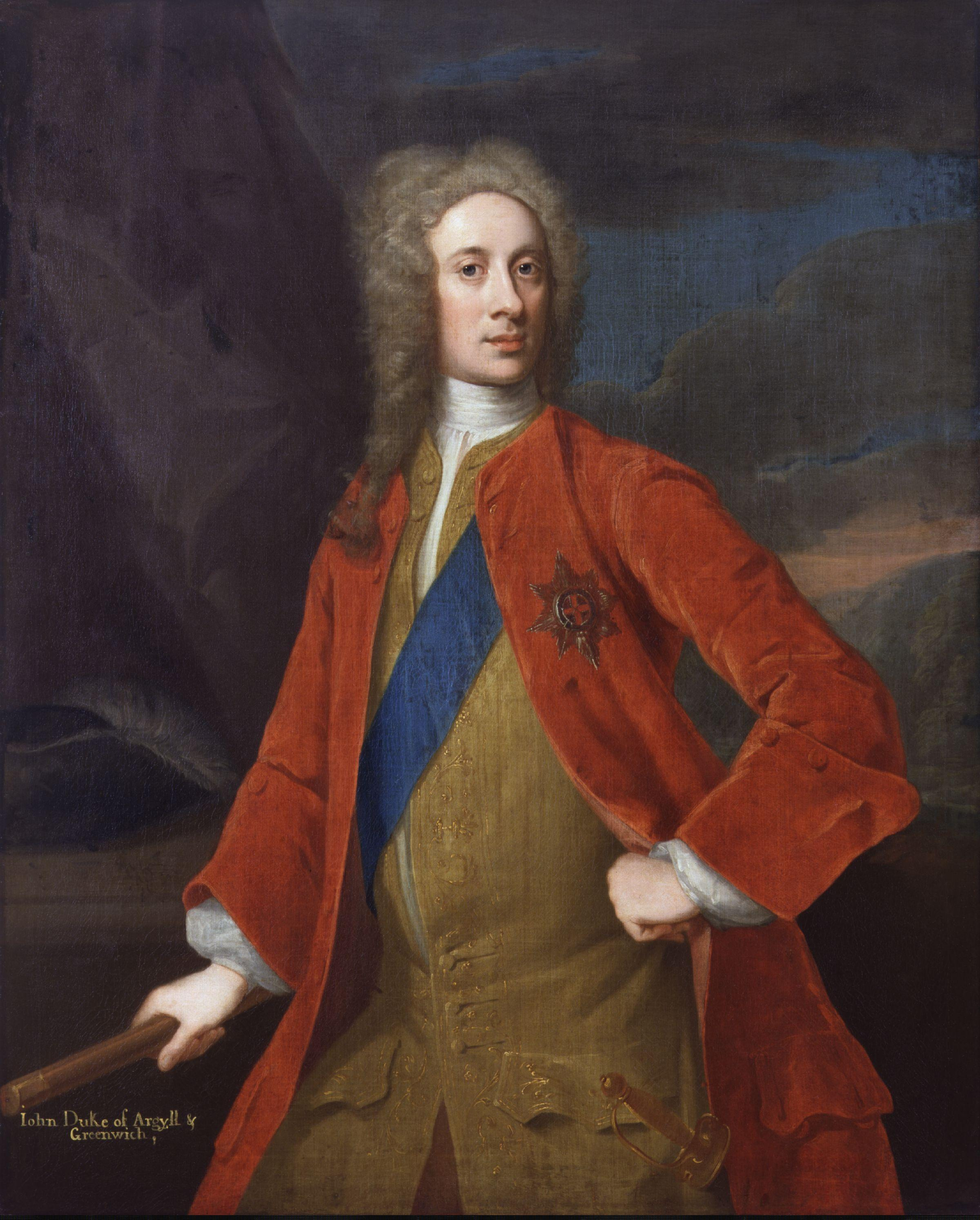
- Portrait of the Duke of Argyll by William Aikman, 1720
- Predecessor: Archibald Campbell, 1st Duke of Argyll
- Successor: Archibald Campbell, 3rd Duke of Argyll
- Other names: Iain Ruaidh nan Cath or Red John of the Battles
- Born: 10 October 1680; Ham House, Petersham, Surrey
- Died: 4 October 1743 (aged 62); Sudbrook Park, Petersham
- Buried: Westminster Abbey
- Wars and battles: Nine Years' War; War of the Spanish Succession; Jacobite rising of 1715
- Spouses: Mary Brown; Jane Warburton
- Issue: 4 daughters, including Caroline and Mary
- Parents: Archibald Campbell, 1st Duke of Argyll; Elizabeth Tollemache

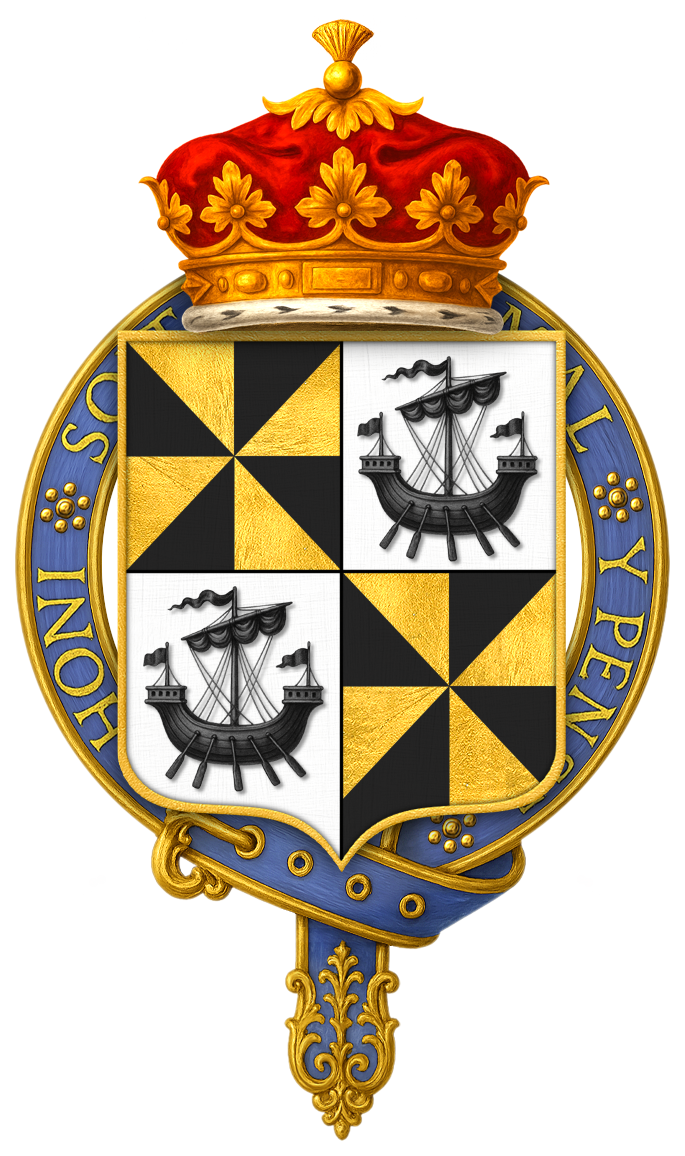
Coat of arms of John Campbell, 2nd Duke of Argyll, KG

Field Marshal John Campbell, 2nd Duke of Argyll, 1st Duke of Greenwich, KG, KT (10 October 1680 – 4 October 1743), styled Lord Lorne from 1680 to 1703, was a British army officer and politician. He served on the continent in the Nine Years' War and fought at the Siege of Kaiserswerth during the War of the Spanish Succession. He then went on to serve as a brigade commander during the later battles of the War of the Spanish Succession, and was subsequently given command of all British forces in Spain at the instigation of the Harley ministry.

After conducting a successful evacuation of the troops from Spain, he became Commander-in-Chief, Scotland. During the Jacobite rising of 1715, he led the government army against the Jacobite forces led by the Earl of Mar at the Battle of Sheriffmuir. Afterwards he served as Lord Steward and then Master-General of the Ordnance under the Walpole–Townshend ministry.

== Early life ==
Born at Ham House, he was the son of Archibald Campbell, 1st Duke of Argyll and Elizabeth Campbell (née Tollemache, daughter of Sir Lionel Tollemache, 3rd Baronet). His mother was a stepdaughter of John Maitland, Duke of Lauderdale, a dominant figure in Scotland during Charles II's reign. Five years after his birth, Campbell's grandfather Archibald Campbell, 9th Earl of Argyll led Argyll's Rising against the rule of James II of England and VII of Scotland for which he was executed in Edinburgh in June 1685. Campbell was privately tutored first by Walter Campbell of Dunloskin, then by John Anderson of Dumbarton and, finally, by Alexander Cunningham.

== Early military career ==
Campbell was commissioned, after his father had given William III some encouragement, as colonel of Lord Lorne's Regiment of Foot, a regiment entirely raised by the Argyll family, on 7 April 1694. He served briefly on the European continent in the Nine Years' War before the regiment was disbanded in 1698. He also served under the Duke of Marlborough at the Siege of Kaiserswerth in April 1702 during the War of the Spanish Succession. He was appointed a Knight of the Order of the Thistle later that year.

Campbell succeeded his father as Duke of Argyll and Chief of Clan Campbell in 1703, and also became colonel of the 4th Troop of Horse Guards and a privy councillor. For the help he gave the Queen persuading the Parliament of Scotland to support the Act of Union, he was created Earl of Greenwich and Baron Chatham in 1705. He then returned to the continent and, having been promoted to major-general early in 1706, served as a brigade commander under Marlborough at the Battle of Ramillies in May 1706 and at the Siege of Ostend in June 1706. After being appointed colonel of Prince George of Denmark's Regiment in 1707, he went on to command a brigade at the Battle of Oudenarde in July 1708 and at the Siege of Lille in the Autumn of 1708. Promoted to lieutenant general in April 1709, he also took part in the Siege of Tournai in June 1709 and the Battle of Malplaquet in September 1709.

Appointed a Knight of the Order of the Garter in December 1710, Campbell was promoted to full general and given command of all British forces in Spain at the instigation of the Harley ministry in January 1711. He replaced James Stanhope who had been forced to surrender at Brihuega the previous December. The Harley government was negotiating an agreement with France which would see Britain recognise Philip V of Spain, in exchange for being allowed to retain Gibraltar and Minorca.

After conducting a successful evacuation of the troops from Spain he became Commander-in-Chief, Scotland in 1712. By 1713, however, Campbell had become critical of the ministry, and he joined the Whig opposition in making speeches against the government's policy on the Malt Tax. In July 1714, during Queen Anne's last illness, Campbell gave his full support to the Hanoverian succession. He was rewarded with the colonelcy of the Royal Horse Guards in June 1715.

== Jacobite Rising ==
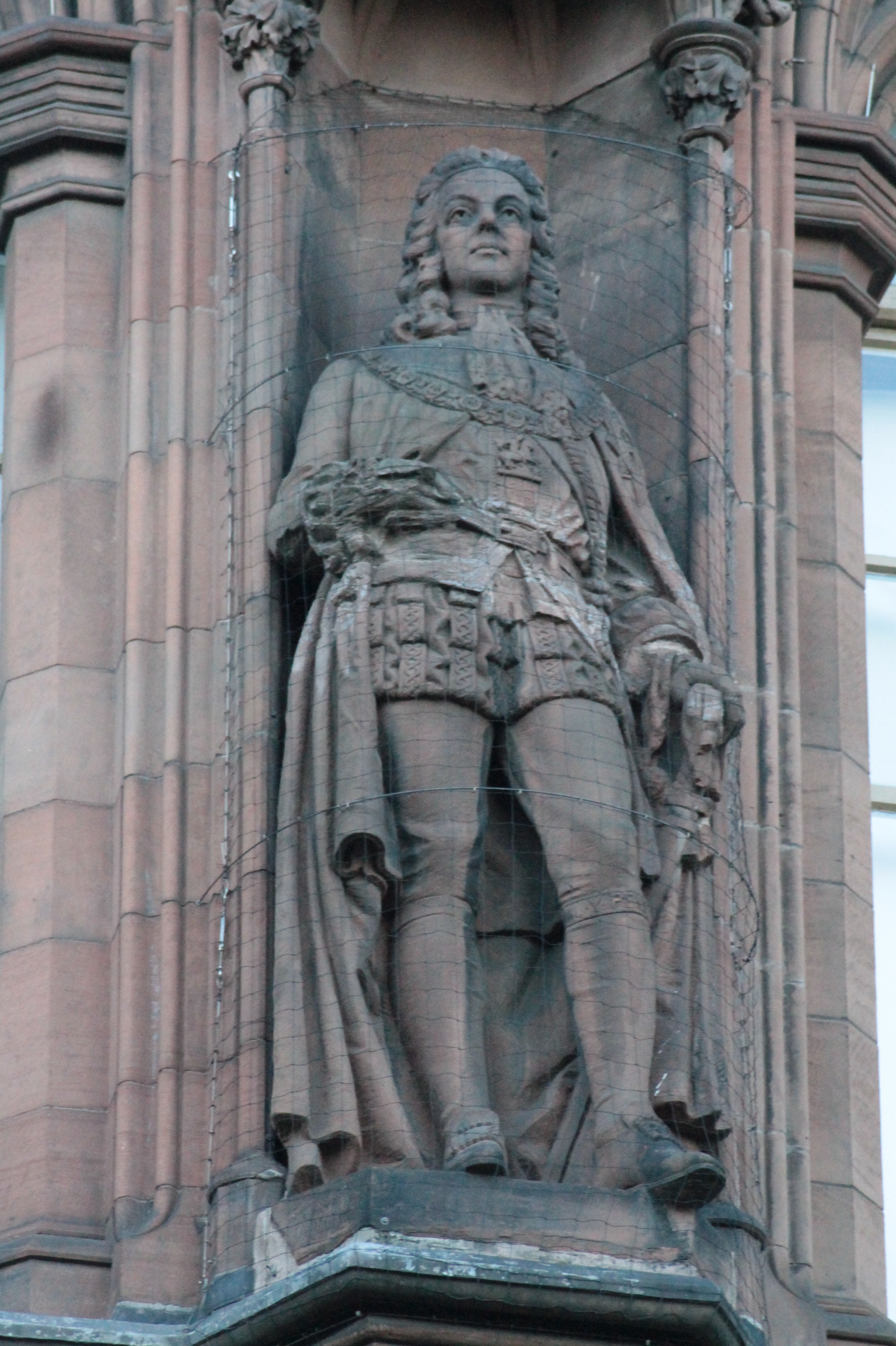
Statue of Argyll at the Scottish National Portrait Gallery

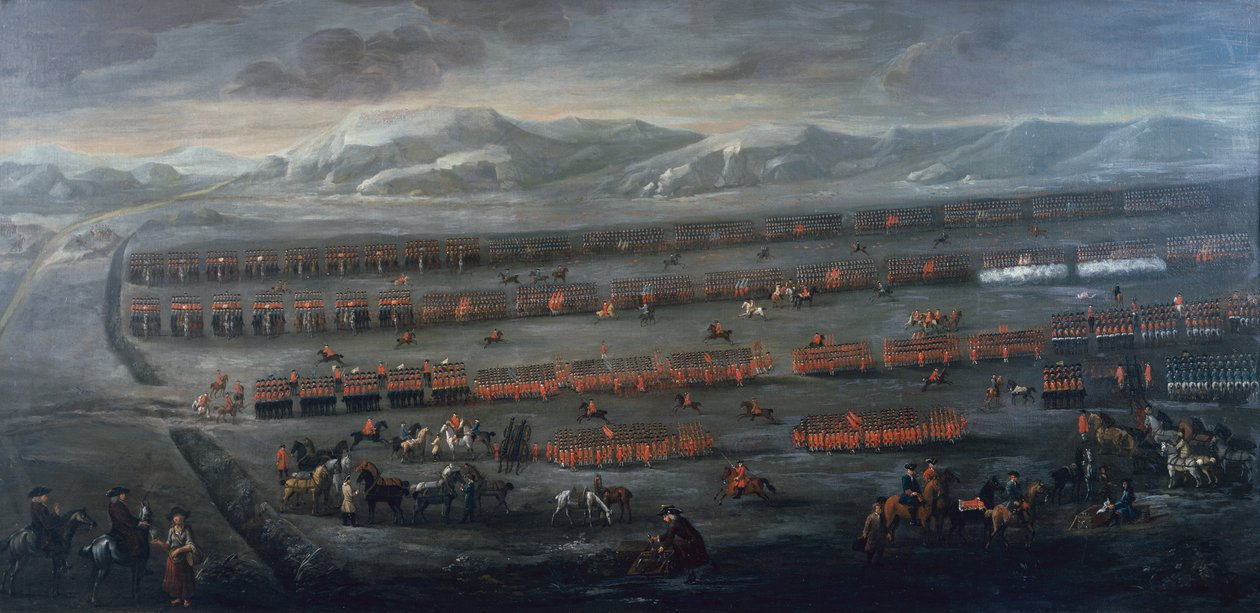
The Battle of Sheriffmuir, where Argyll led the government army

During the Jacobite rising of 1715, Campbell led the government army against the Jacobites led by the Earl of Mar at the Battle of Sheriffmuir in November 1715. The battle was indecisive but favoured the government strategically. He led the advance against the Jacobite capital of Perth, capturing it in December with little bloodshed, but was then replaced as commander by William Cadogan.

== Later career ==
Campbell arrived back in London early in March 1716, and at first stood high in the king's favour, but in a few months was stripped of his offices. This, however, did not deter him from the discharge of his parliamentary duties; he supported the bill for the impeachment of Bishop Atterbury, and lent his aid to his countrymen by opposing the bill for punishing the city of Edinburgh for the Porteous Riots. At the beginning of the year 1719 he was again admitted into favour, and in April was created Duke of Greenwich.

He went on to become Lord Steward of the Household in 1721 and then Master-General of the Ordnance in June 1725 under the Walpole–Townshend ministry. He also became colonel of the Queen's Regiment of Horse in August 1726 and, having been appointed Governor of Portsmouth in November 1730, he was restored to the colonelcy of the Royal Horse Guards in August 1733.

In the 1720s he commissioned the architect James Gibbs to design a Palladian house at Sudbrook Park close to his birthplace at Ham House.

Promoted to field marshal on 31 January 1735, Campbell was stripped of his post as Master-General of the Ordnance and the colonelcy of the Royal Horse Guards for opposing the Government of Robert Walpole in 1740. However he was restored to his post as Master-General of the Ordnance in February 1741 and restored to his colonelcy a few days later. However, disapproving the measures of the new administration, and apparently disappointed at not being given the command of the army, he shortly resigned all his posts, and spent the rest of his life in privacy and retirement.

Campbell died at Sudbrook Park, Petersham on 4 October 1743 and was buried in Westminster Abbey; his grave is marked by a small lozenge stone to the north east of Henry VII's tomb. A large monument, designed by the French sculptor, Louis-François Roubiliac, was erected for him in the south transept and unveiled in 1749.

Argyll Street in London's West End is named after him.

== Family ==
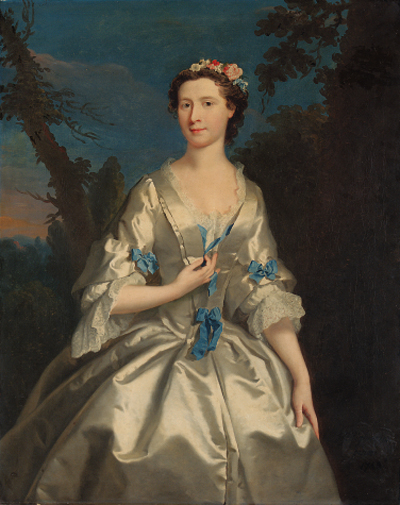
Hugh Warburton's sister Jane Campbell, Duchess of Argyll by Joseph Highmore, 1743

Campbell married first, Mary Brown, daughter of John Brown and Ursula Duncombe, in 1701: they separated soon after the marriage and she died in 1717 and was buried in Westminster Abbey. He married in 1717 secondly, Jane Warburton, daughter of Thomas Warburton and Anne Williams, sister of Hugh Warburton and maid of honour to Queen Anne; Jane died in 1767 and was buried with him in Westminster Abbey. He had four daughters who reached maturity:

- Caroline Townshend, 1st Baroness Greenwich
- Lady Elizabeth Campbell, married James Stuart-Mackenzie
- Lady Anne Campbell, married William Wentworth
- Lady Mary Coke.

== In popular culture ==
Campbell is played by James Robertson Justice in the 1953 film Rob Roy, the Highland Rogue. He is played by Andrew Keir in Michael Caton-Jones's Rob Roy.

== Sources ==
- Hugill, J.A.C. No Peace Without Spain. Kensal Press, 1991.
- Heathcote, Tony (1999). The British Field Marshals 1736-1997. Pen & Sword Books Ltd. ISBN 0-85052-696-5.
- Mosley, Charles (2003). Burke's Peerage, Baronetage & Knightage, 107th edition, Volume I. Burke's Peerage (Genealogical Books). ISBN 978-0971196629.

Parliament of Scotland
Preceded by The Marquess of Tweeddale	Lord High Commissioner; 1705–1706	Succeeded by The Duke of Queensberry
Political offices
Preceded by The Duke of Kent	Lord Steward; 1718–1725	Succeeded by The Duke of Dorset
Military offices
Preceded by Earl of Argyll	Colonel of Lord Lorne's Regiment of Foot; 1694–1697	Regiment disbanded
Preceded by Earl of Argyll	Colonel of the 4th Troop of Horse Guards; 1703–1715	Succeeded by The Earl of Dundonald
Preceded by Lord Strathnaver	Colonel of The Duke of Argyll's Regiment of Foot; 1703–1707	Succeeded by Marquess of Tullibardine
Preceded by Thomas Stringer	Colonel of The Duke of Argyll's Regiment of Foot; 1706–1707	Succeeded by The Earl of Orrery
Preceded by Charles Churchill	Colonel of Prince George of Denmark's Regiment; 1707–1711	Succeeded by John Selwyn
Preceded by The Earl of Leven	Governor of Edinburgh Castle; 1712–1714	Succeeded by The Earl of Orkney
Preceded by The Earl of Peterborough	Colonel of the Royal Horse Guards; 1715–1717	Succeeded by The Duke of Bolton
Preceded by The Lord Londonderry	Colonel of The Queen's Regiment of Horse; 1726–1733	Succeeded by William Evans
Preceded by The Duke of Bolton	Colonel of the Royal Horse Guards; 1733–1740	Succeeded by Lord Seymour
Preceded by Earl of Hertford	Colonel of the Royal Horse Guards; 1741–1742	Succeeded by Earl of Hertford
Preceded by The Earl of Leven	Commander-in-Chief, Scotland; 1712–1716	Succeeded by The Lord Carpenter
Preceded by The Earl Cadogan	Master-General of the Ordnance; 1725–1740	Succeeded by The Duke of Montagu
Preceded by George MacCartney	Governor of Portsmouth; 1730–1737	Succeeded by The Viscount Shannon
Preceded by The Duke of Montagu	Master-General of the Ordnance; 1741–1742	Succeeded by The Duke of Montagu
Honorary titles
Preceded by The Earl of Halifax	Lord Lieutenant of Surrey; 1715–1716	Succeeded by The Lord Onslow
Peerage of Scotland
Preceded by Archibald Campbell	Duke of Argyll; 1703–1743	Succeeded by Archibald Campbell
Peerage of Great Britain
New creation	Duke of Greenwich; 1719–1743	Extinct
Peerage of England
New creation	Earl of Greenwich; 1705–1743	Extinct
