= Archibald Campbell, 1st Duke of Argyll =

Scottish peer

Archibald Campbell, Duke of Argyll
- 1st Duke of Argyll; 10th Earl of Argyll
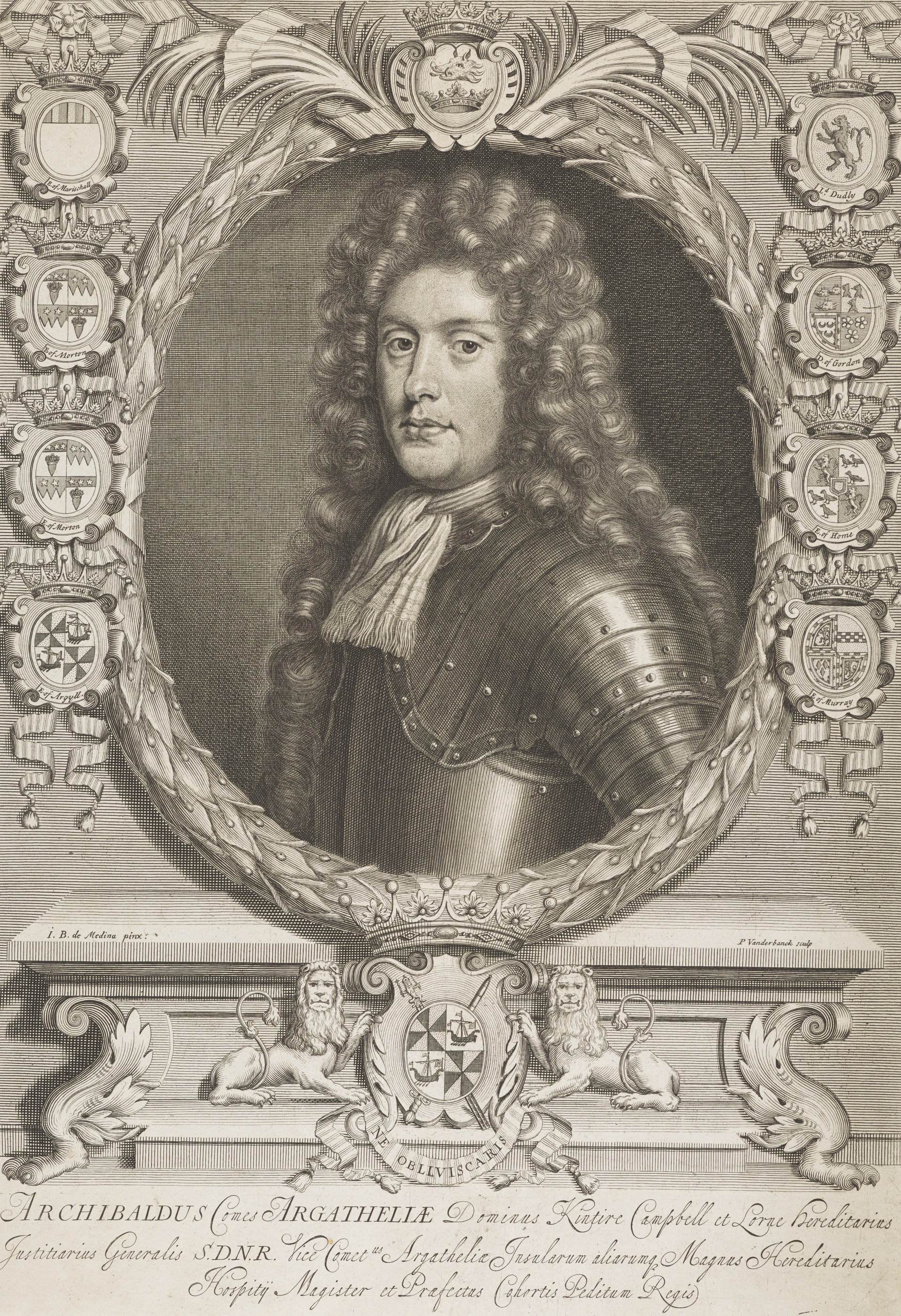
- Born: 25 July 1658
- Died: 1 September 1703 (aged 45)
- Noble family: Clan Campbell
- Father: Archibald Campbell, 9th Earl of Argyll
- Mother: Mary Stuart

Arms of the Dukes of Argyll

Archibald Campbell, 1st Duke of Argyll, 10th Earl of Argyll (25 July 1658 – September 1703) was a Scottish peer.

== Biography ==
Born 25 July 1658 in Cherton House, Northumberland, Archibald Campbell was the eldest son of Archibald Campbell, 9th Earl of Argyll and Mary Stuart, daughter of James Stuart, 4th Earl of Moray.

Archibald Campbell's father, the 9th Earl of Argyll, faced an attainder and was executed for his role in Monmouth's Rebellion (1685). After his father's execution Archibald travelled to the Netherlands but eventually returned and sought to recover his father's estates by gaining King James VII's favor. However, after failing to do so, he went to The Hague and supported William and Mary's quest for the throne; this important support later led to the monarchs restoring his father's estate in 1690. In spite of the attainder, he was admitted in 1689 to the Convention of the Estates of Scotland as earl of Argyll, and he was deputed, with Sir James Montgomery and Sir John Dalrymple, to present the crown to William in its name, and to tender him the coronation oath. Also, he was made a Privy Councillor. He was William's chief Scottish advisor, and was colonel-in-chief of the Earl of Argyll's Regiment of Foot, that was involved in the 1692 massacre of the MacDonalds of Glen Coe, but took no part in any of its field operations. In 1696 he was made a lord of the treasury, and was created a duke by William on 3 June 1701.

On 12 March 1678, he married Elizabeth Tollemache (daughter of Elizabeth and Sir Lionel Tollemache, 3rd Baronet) at Edinburgh, Scotland. Elizabeth's stepfather John Maitland, 1st Duke of Lauderdale was a dominant figure in Scottish politics of the era. They had four children, born at Ham House outside London:

- John Campbell, 2nd Duke of Argyll (10 October 1680 – 4 October 1743)
- Archibald Campbell, 3rd Duke of Argyll (June 1682 – 15 April 1761)
- Lady Margaret Campbell(2 June 1690 – died bef 1703), not mentioned in father's will
- Lady Anne Campbell (12 Jan 1692 – 20 October 1736), m. James Stuart, 2nd Earl of Bute

The 1st Duke of Argyll is buried at Kilmun Parish Church.

Military offices
Preceded by The Duke of Queensberry	Captain and Colonel of the Scots Troop of Horse Guards; 1696–1703	Succeeded by The Duke of Argyll
Peerage of Scotland
New creation	Duke of Argyll; 1701–1703	Succeeded by John Campbell
Preceded by Archibald Campbell	Earl of Argyll; 1685–1703	Succeeded by John Campbell
