= Robert Campbell of Glenlyon =

Scottish soldier

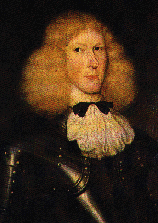
Robert Campbell of Glenlyon

Robert Campbell, 5th Laird of Glenlyon (1630 – 2 August 1696), was a minor member of Scottish nobility and is best known as one of the commanding officers at the Massacre of Glencoe.

== Life ==
Robert was the second son of Archibald Campbell, fier of Glenlyon (eldest son of Duncan Campbell, 4th of Glenlyon), and his wife Jean, daughter of Sir Robert Campbell (1575–1657), 3rd Baronet and 9th Laird of Glenorchy. He inherited Meggernie Castle, in Glenlyon, from his father and set about improving it in line with current fashions. He roofed it with slates instead of thatch, he enlarged it very substantially and in the process created one of the stately homes of Perthshire. This, along with heavy drinking, gambling and a string of unwise investments, pushed him to the brink of bankruptcy. Though he borrowed from his friends, his relatives and his tenants, he still could not meet his debts.

In a last effort to clear his debts, he sold all the woods of Glenlyon which were part of the old Caledonian forest.

Workmen arrived from the lowlands to fell the trees, which were sent floating down the Lyon, choking the river, causing widespread flooding, but consolidating his financial position.

While Robert Campbell was still unable to satisfy his creditors, his own tenants offered him half their cattle to pay off his debts but he refused, and sold almost all of the estate to the Earl of Tullibardine in 1684.

All that he retained was Chesthill, a house and small estate between Glenlyon and Fortingall, which belonged to his wife.

In 1689, on their return from the Battle of Dunkeld, the MacIains of Glencoe (a sept of Clan MacDonald), together with their Glengarry cousins, looted Glenlyon, stole his livestock, and razed Campbell's last remaining holdings, increasing his financial problems from debts.

In his subsequent appeal for compensation, Campbell showed he clearly believed the Glengarry men to be the more culpable, making no mention of Glencoe.

In a final effort to support his wife and family, Robert Campbell, at the age of fifty nine, joined the Earl of Argyll's Regiment of Foot and came to play his part in the Glencoe massacre. The fact of the stolen cattle and Glenlyon's involvement in the massacre were used by King William and his officials in an attempt in a coverup their own involvement by claiming that the massacre as simply the outcome of cattle raiding and inter-clan warfare.

The available evidence, including the aforementioned appeal for compensation, shows that this was not the case.

The Argyll Regiment was sent to fight in Flanders, in the War of the Grand Alliance, but was defeated by the French armies at Diksmuide in 1696. Campbell died in poverty in Bruges on 2 August 1696.

== Family ==
Campbell married (contract dated 1 October 1663) Helen, the daughter of Sir Alexander Lindsay 1st Bt., of Evelick and his wife Marjorie, daughter of Sir Alexander Falconer 1st Bt., of Glenfarquhar in the Baronetage of Nova Scotia. Lady Glenlyon was the sister-in-law of her cousin Sir Charles Ramsay, 3rd Bt., of Balmain. Their children included:

- John Campbell, 6th of Glenlyon (born c. 1675); married Katherine, daughter of Patrick Smythe, 6th of Braco, 1st of Methven
- Duncan Campbell, of Duneaves
- Robert Campbell, who married Sarah Wood, daughter of John Wood of Tulliallan
- Alexander Campbell, who married Mary, daughter of Duncan Stewart, 1st of Strathgarry; Minister of Dunoon.
- James Campbell
- Elizabeth Campbell, who married Alexander Campbell, 1st of Wester Ardeonaig
- Janet Campbell, who married Robert Campbell, 1st of Borland
- Jean Campbell, who married Robert MacNab of that Ilk, 10th Laird and 14th Chief of Bovaine.
