= Peter Graham (artist) =

British artist

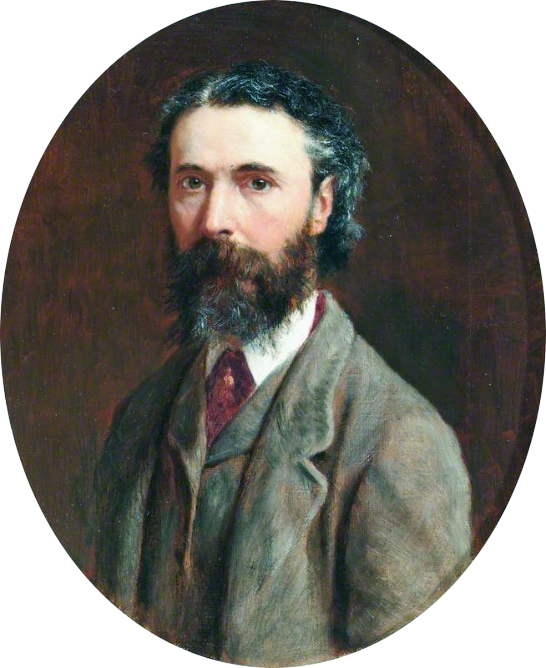
- Self-portrait, 1882
- Born: 13 March 1836; Edinburgh, Scotland, United Kingdom
- Died: 18 October 1921 (aged 85); St Andrews, Scotland, United Kingdom
- Known for: Painting

Peter Graham (1836–1921) was a Scottish artist, known as a landscape painter. He became known particularly for his scenes in the Scottish Highlands. After moving to London he submitted his Spate in the Highlands to the Royal Academy Exhibition of 1866 which attracted critical acclaim.

He was elected an associate member of the British Royal Academy in 1877 and a full member in 1881. He submitted Homewards as his diploma work the following year.

== Gallery ==
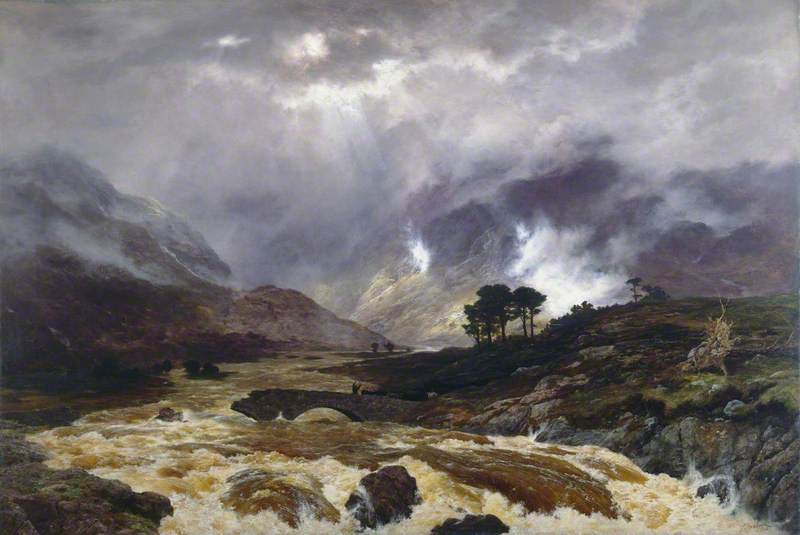
A Spate in the Highlands, 1866

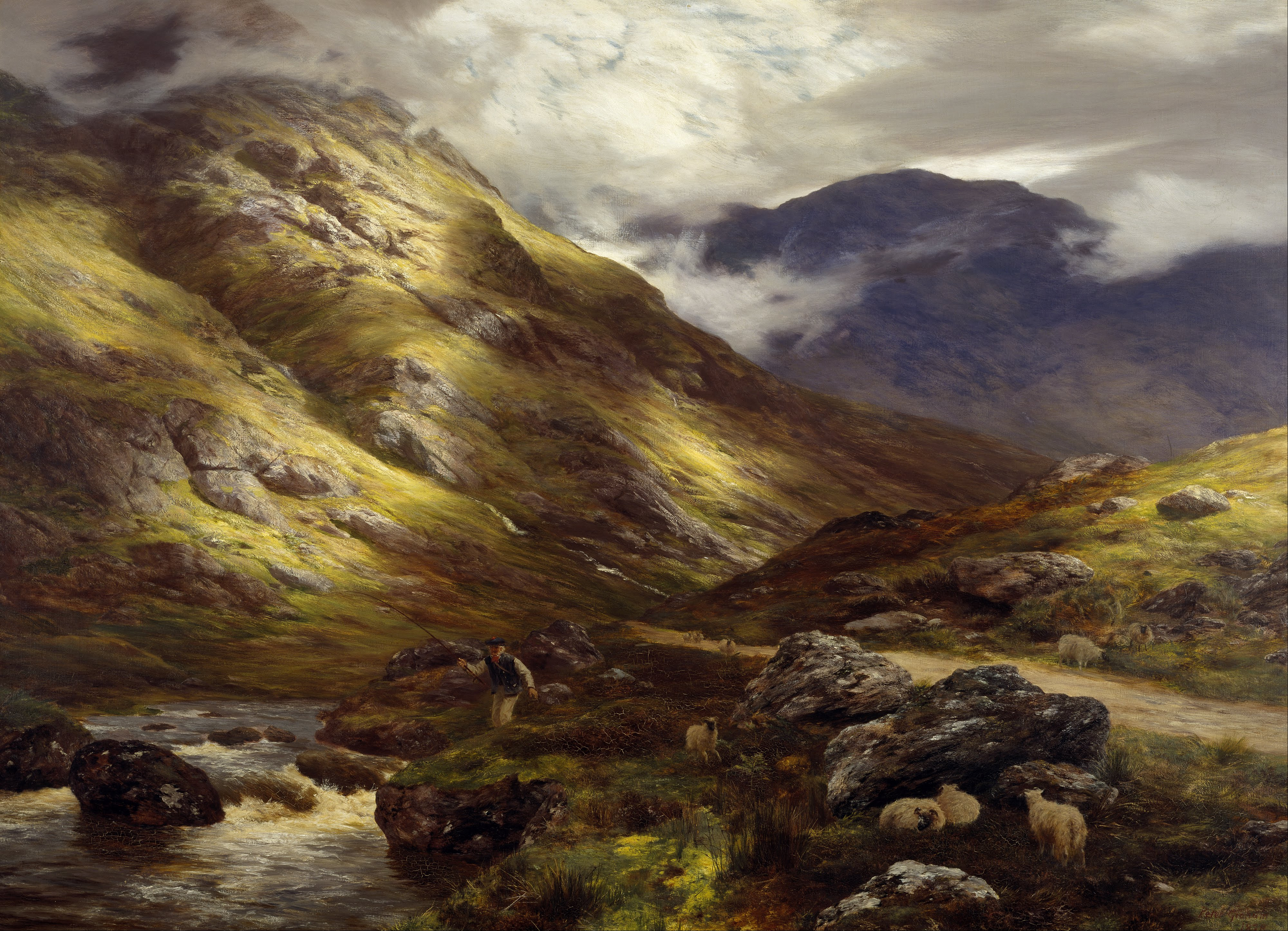
Wandering Shadows, 1878

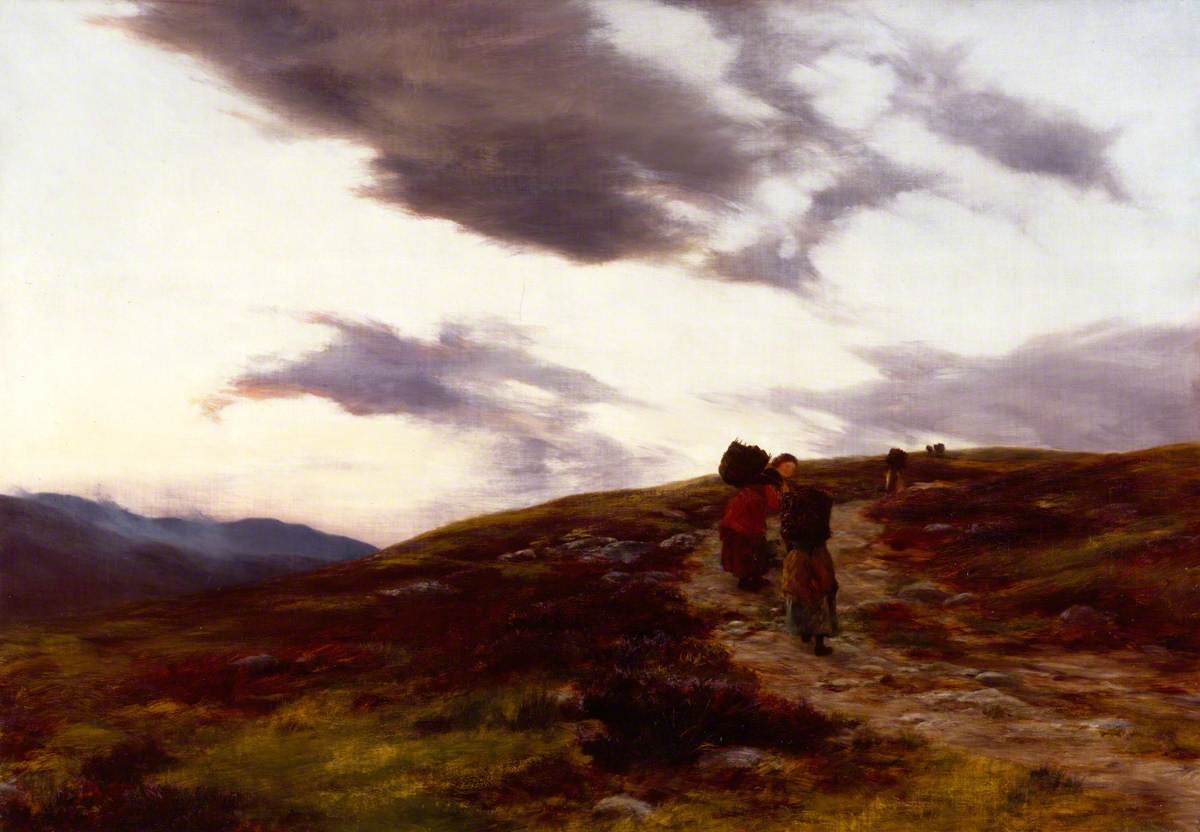
Homewards, 1882

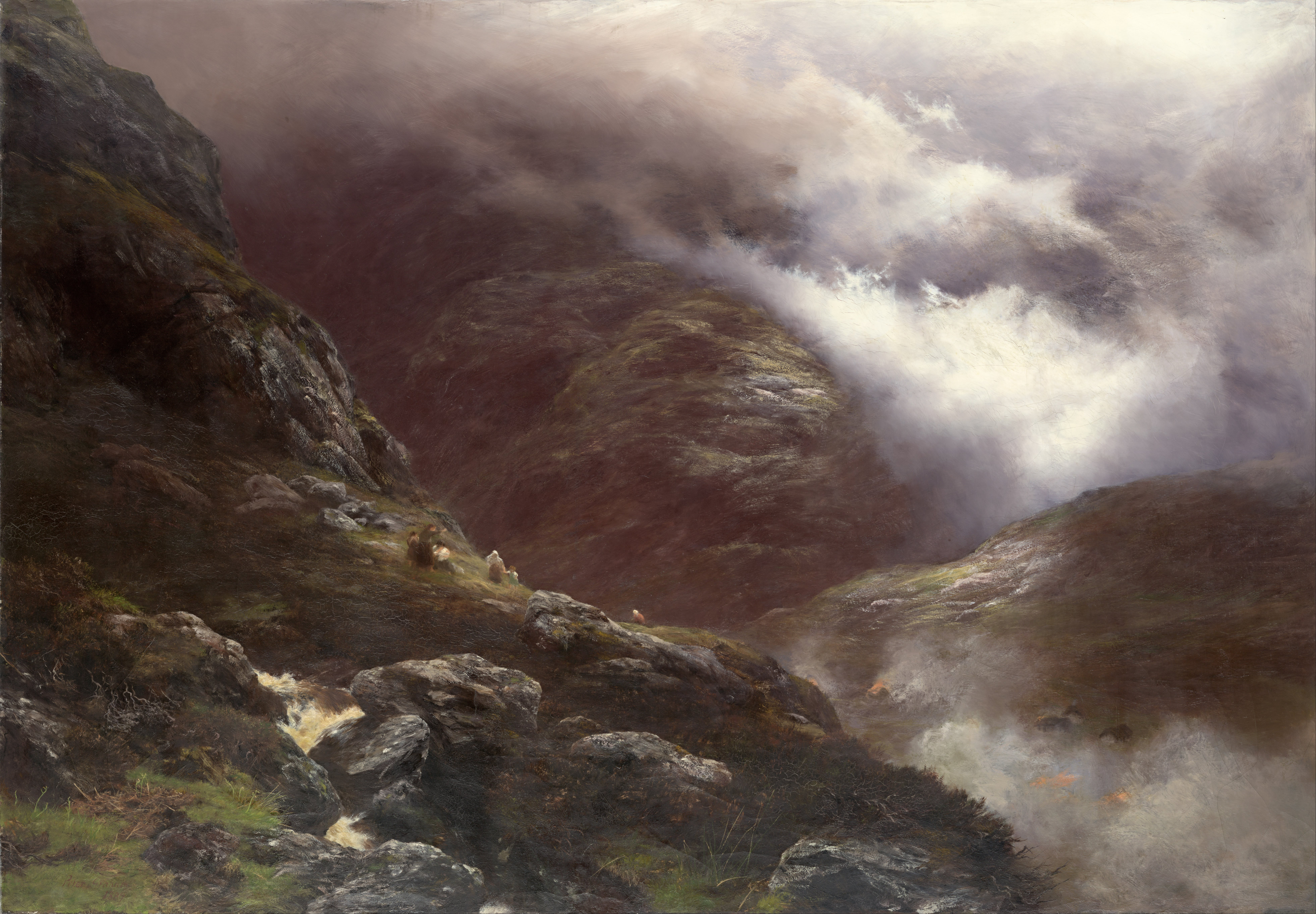
After the Massacre of Glencoe, 1889

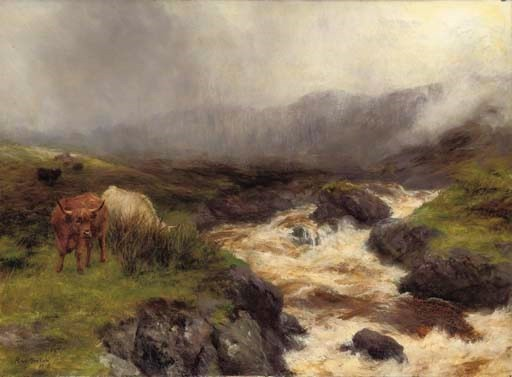
Clearing After Rain, 1919

== Bibliography ==
- Mingay, G.E. (ed)The Victorian Countryside: Volume 1. Routledge, 2000.
- Spoor, Freya (ed.) Scottish Art in the Industrial Age, 1800-1914: Volume II. Routledge, 2005.
