= 1690s in Scotland =

Events from the 1690s in the Kingdom of Scotland.

== Incumbents ==
Monarch

- William II, r. 1689–1702 (Co-monarch with Mary II)
- Mary II r. 1689–1694 (Co-monarch with William III & II)

== Events ==
1690

- 30 April – 1 May: the Jacobite rising of Viscount Dundee ends in defeat at the Battle of Cromdale.

1692

- 13 February – massacre of Glencoe: Members of Clan MacDonald of Glencoe killed by members of Clan Campbell after they refuse to swear allegiance to King William III.

1694

- 28 December – on the death of Queen Mary II, William III becomes sole monarch of Scotland, England and Ireland.

1695

- 9 May – Parliament of Scotland assembles to investigate the Glencoe massacre.
- 1 November – establishment of the Bank of Scotland.

1696

- Education Act 1696 ordains a school in every parish (successful; act governs education until the 1872 act).

1698

- July – first expedition sets sail as part of the Darien scheme.
- November – the colony of New Caledonia established on the Isthmus of Panama.

1699

- The colony of New Caledonia abandoned; the colonists return to Scotland.
- September – the second expedition to Darien sets sail, unaware of the failure of the first.

== Births ==
1692

- 22 April – James Stirling, mathematician (died 1770)

1695

- 5 October – John Glas, clergyman (died 1773)

1696

- 11 June – James Francis Edward Keith, soldier (died 1758)

1698

- February – Colin Maclaurin, mathematician (died 1746)
- 11 July – George Turnbull, philosopher, theologian, teacher, writer (died 1748)

1699

- 17 April – Robert Blair, poet (died 1746)

== Deaths ==
1690

- 3 October – Robert Barclay, writer and Quaker (born 1648)

1692

- 3 August – James Douglas, Earl of Angus, nobleman and soldier (born 1671)

1694

- 28 December – Mary II, Queen of Scots (born 1662)

1695

- 29 November – James Dalrymple, 1st Viscount of Stair, lawyer and statesman (born 1619)

1696

- 2 August – Robert Campbell of Glenlyon, nobleman and commanding officer at the Massacre of Glencoe (born 1630)

1697

- 26 March – Godfrey McCulloch, baronet and politician (executed for murder) (born c. 1640)

1699

- 29 November – Patrick Gordon, general in the Russian Army (born 1635)
