= 1697 in Scotland =

- Centuries: 15th; 16th; 17th; 18th; 19th
- Decades: 1670s; 1680s; 1690s; 1700s; 1710s
- See also: List of years in Scotland; Timeline of Scottish history 1697 in: England • Elsewhere

Events from the year 1697 in the Kingdom of Scotland.

== Incumbents ==
- Monarch – William II
- Secretary of State – John Murray, Earl of Tullibardine, jointly with James Ogilvy, 4th Earl of Findlater

=== Law officers ===
- Lord Advocate – Sir James Stewart
- Solicitor General for Scotland – Sir Patrick Hume

=== Judiciary ===
- Lord President of the Court of Session – vacant??
- Lord Justice General – Lord Lothian
- Lord Justice Clerk – Lord Ormiston

== Events ==
- 8 January – student Thomas Aikenhead becomes the last person in Great Britain to be executed for blasphemy when he is hanged outside Edinburgh.
- 10 June – the last mass execution for witchcraft in western Europe when five Paisley witches are hanged and then burned.
- Famine in the Borders leads to continued Scottish Presbyterian migration from Scotland to Ulster.
- Icelandic-Norwegian historian and professor Th. Torfæus (Þormóður Torfason), publishes his work on the Orkney Islands, Orknøerne.

== Births ==
- 23 January – James Fisher, a founder of the Secession church (died 1775)
- 5 February – William Smellie, obstetrician (died 1763)
- 19 September – Alexander Monro, physician and founder of Edinburgh Medical School (died 1767)
- 23 September – Andrew Plummer, physician and chemist (died 1756)
- 2 November – James Douglas, 3rd Marquess of Queensberry, nobleman, described as 'violently insane'; slaughters, roasts and eats a scullion when just ten years old (died 1715)
- date unknown – Charles Hamilton, Lord Binning, nobleman, politician and poet (died 1732)

== Deaths ==
- 8 January – Thomas Aikenhead, student and last person in Great Britain executed for blasphemy (born 1676)
- 11 August – John Hay, 1st Marquess of Tweeddale, Lord Chancellor of Scotland (1692–96) (born 1625)
- date unknown – Alexander Gordon, Royalist and pioneer in British North America (born 1635)

== The arts ==
- A Collection of several Poems and Verses composed upon various occasions by William Cleland is published posthumously.

== See also ==
- Timeline of Scottish history
