= 1699 in Scotland =

- Centuries: 15th; 16th; 17th; 18th; 19th
- Decades: 1670s; 1680s; 1690s; 1700s; 1710s
- See also: List of years in Scotland; Timeline of Scottish history 1699 in: England • Wales • Elsewhere

Events from the year 1699 in the Kingdom of Scotland.

== Incumbents ==
- Monarch – William II
- Secretary of State – James Ogilvy, 1st Earl of Seafield, jointly with John Carmichael, 1st Earl of Hyndford (from 31 January)

=== Law officers ===
- Lord Advocate – Sir James Stewart
- Solicitor General for Scotland – Sir Patrick Hume

=== Judiciary ===
- Lord President of the Court of Session – Lord North Berwick
- Lord Justice General – Lord Lothian
- Lord Justice Clerk – Lord Ormiston, then Lord Pollok

== Events ==
- 12 January – James Sutherland is appointed first Regius Keeper of the Royal Botanic Garden Edinburgh and first King's Botanist.
- 2 March – The Edinburgh Gazette is first published.
- July – Darien scheme: The colony of New Edinburgh on the Gulf of Darién is abandoned; the colonists set out to return to Scotland.
- September – Darien scheme: The second expedition to Darien sets sail, unaware of the failure of the first.
- 23 September – A total solar eclipse affects the North-East of the country, including Wick.

== Births ==
- 2 February – Hugh MacDonald, bishop (died 1773)
- 13 April – Alexander Ross, poet (died 1784)
- 17 April – Robert Blair, poet (died 1746)
- 19 April – John Farquharson, Jesuit (died 1746)
- 31 May – Alexander Cruden, Biblical scholar (died 1770 in London)

Date unknown

- John Dalrymple, Member of Parliament for Wigtown Burghs, 1728–34 (died 1742)
- William Ged, goldsmith, inventor of stereotyping (died 1782)

== Deaths ==
- 29 November – Patrick Gordon, general in the Russian Army (born 1635)

== See also ==
- Timeline of Scottish history
