= 1702 in Scotland =

- Centuries: 16th; 17th; 18th; 19th; 20th
- Decades: 1680s; 1690s; 1700s; 1710s; 1720s
- See also: List of years in Scotland; Timeline of Scottish history 1702 in: England • Wales • Elsewhere

Events from the year 1702 in the Kingdom of Scotland.

== Incumbents ==
- Monarch – William II (until 8 March), then Anne
- Secretary of State –
  - until 6 May: James Ogilvy, 1st Earl of Seafield, jointly with John Carmichael, 1st Earl of Hyndford
  - 6 May – 21 November: James Ogilvy, 4th Earl of Findlater, jointly with James Douglas, 2nd Duke of Queensberry
  - from 21 November: James Douglas, 2nd Duke of Queensberry, jointly with George Mackenzie, 1st Viscount Tarbat

=== Law officers ===
- Lord Advocate – Sir James Stewart
- Solicitor General for Scotland – William Carmichael

=== Judiciary ===
- Lord President of the Court of Session – Lord North Berwick
- Lord Justice General – Lord Lothian
- Lord Justice Clerk – Lord Pollok, then Lord Prestonhall

== Events ==
- c. January/February – the Parliament of Scotland refuses to pass an Abjuration Act analogous to the English Security of the Succession, etc. Act 1701.
- 8 March – King William II of Scotland (William III of England and Ireland and Stadtholder of the Netherlands) dies in London following complications from a fall from his horse when it stumbles on a molehill and is succeeded by Queen Anne, the last Stuart monarch on the English, Scottish and Irish thrones.
- May – "Women's riot" in Stirling in opposition to military impressment.
- The Advocates Library is moved from the Faculty of Advocates to Parliament House, Edinburgh.
- A General Election is held in autumn that would assemble the last Parliament of Scotland in May, 1703.

== Births ==
- 8 May – Andrew Lauder, Baronet (died 1769)
- 18 July – Maria Clementina Sobieska, wife of James Francis Edward Stuart and mother of Charles Edward Stuart (born in Polish Silesia; died 1735 in Rome)
- 24 December – John Lindsay, 20th Earl of Crawford, soldier (died of wounds 1749 in London)

Date unknown

- James Douglas, 14th Earl of Morton, astronomer (died 1768 in London)

== Deaths ==
- 8 March – King William II of Scotland (born 1650 in the Netherlands)

Date unknown

- Sir Andrew Agnew, 3rd Baronet, Member of Parliament

== See also ==
- Timeline of Scottish history
