= 1701 in Scotland =

- Centuries: 16th; 17th; 18th; 19th; 20th
- Decades: 1680s; 1690s; 1700s; 1710s; 1720s
- See also: List of years in Scotland; Timeline of Scottish history 1701 in: England • Wales • Elsewhere

Events from the year 1701 in the Kingdom of Scotland.

== Incumbents ==
- Monarch – William II
- Secretary of State – James Ogilvy, 1st Earl of Seafield, jointly with James Douglas, 2nd Duke of Queensberry

=== Law officers ===
- Lord Advocate – Sir James Stewart
- Solicitor General for Scotland – William Carmichael

=== Judiciary ===
- Lord President of the Court of Session – Lord North Berwick
- Lord Justice General – Lord Lothian
- Lord Justice Clerk – Lord Pollok

== Events ==
- 14 March – all illegal cargoes of grain brought to the west of Scotland from Ireland are ordered to be sunk.
- 21 June – title of Duke of Argyll in the Peerage of Scotland created in favour of Archibald Campbell.
- 28 June – title of Myrton Baronetcy, of Gogar in the County of Edinburgh in the Baronetage of Nova Scotia created in favour of Andrew Myrton.
- 16 September (N.S.) – on the death of the deposed King James VII of Scotland in exile at the Château de Saint-Germain-en-Laye in France, his son James Francis Edward Stuart declares himself James VIII (and III of England and Ireland).
- Act "for preventing wrongous Imprisonments and against undue delayes in Tryals" gives effect to habeas corpus in Scotland and confirms the power of procurators fiscal to prosecute criminal cases on behalf of the Crown.
- Title of Marquess of Annandale in the Peerage of Scotland created in favour of William Johnstone, who is also this year Lord High Commissioner to the General Assembly of the Church of Scotland.
- Cairnryan established.

== Births ==
- 15 March – John Carmichael, 3rd Earl of Hyndford, diplomat (died 1767)
- 4 May – William Grant, Lord Prestongrange, politician and judge (died 1764 in Bath)
- 11 June – David Carnegie, 5th Earl of Northesk (died 1741)
- 4 August – Thomas Blackwell, classical scholar (died 1757)

== Deaths ==
- January – Kenneth Mackenzie, 4th Earl of Seaforth (born 1661)
- April – David Ruthven, 2nd Lord Ruthven of Freeland (year of birth unknown)
- 23 May – William Kidd, privateer (born c. 1645; hanged at Execution Dock in London)
- 7 June – Gilbert Rule, nonconformist divine and Principal of the University of Edinburgh (born c. 1629)
- June – Charles Hamilton, 5th Earl of Abercorn (year of birth unknown)
- 23 July – John Kennedy, 7th Earl of Cassilis (born 1653)
- 16 September – King James VII of Scotland (born 1633)
- 1 November – Alexander Stuart, 5th Earl of Moray (born 1634)

== See also ==
- Timeline of Scottish history
