= 1692 in Scotland =

- Centuries: 15th; 16th; 17th; 18th; 19th
- Decades: 1670s; 1680s; 1690s; 1700s; 1710s
- See also: List of years in Scotland; Timeline of Scottish history 1692 in: England • Elsewhere

Events from the year 1692 in the Kingdom of Scotland.

== Incumbents ==
- Monarch – William II and Mary II
- Secretary of State – John Dalrymple, Master of Stair, with James Johnston (from 3 March)

=== Law officers ===
- Lord Advocate – John Dalrymple, then Sir James Stewart
- Solicitor General for Scotland – ??

=== Judiciary ===
- Lord President of the Court of Session – Lord Stair
- Lord Justice General – Lord Lothian
- Lord Justice Clerk – Lord Cessnock, then Lord Ormiston

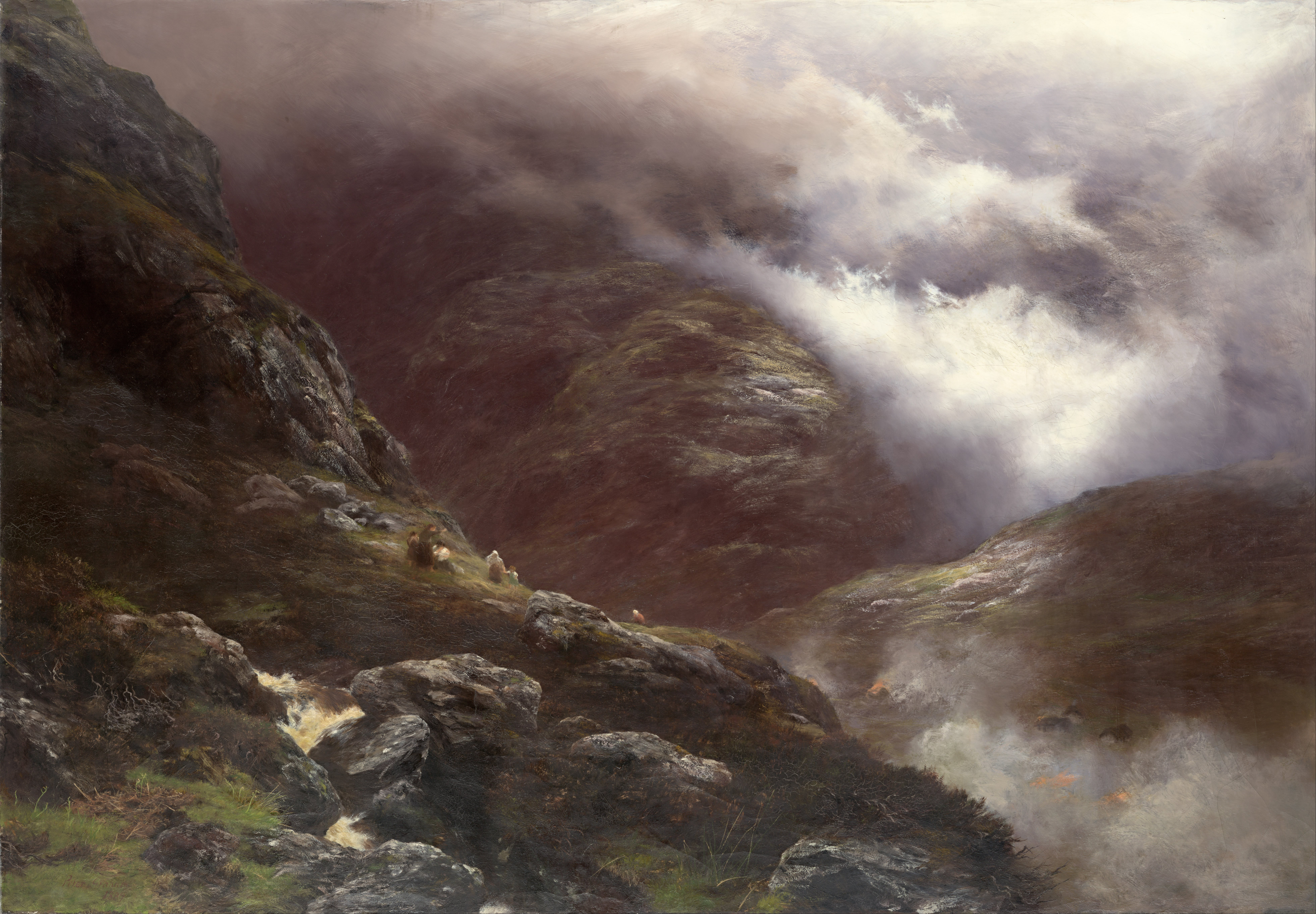
After the Massacre of Glencoe (13 February), painted in 1889 by Peter Graham

== Events ==
- 13 February – Massacre of Glencoe: Men of the Earl of Argyll's Regiment of Foot under the command of Captain Robert Campbell of Glenlyon massacre around 30 Jacobite-sympathising MacDonald of Glencoe from whom they have previously accepted hospitality.

== Births ==
- May – James Stirling mathematician, (died 1770)
- 25 May – Archibald Douglas, 2nd Earl of Forfar, peer, mortally wounded at the Battle of Sheriffmuir (died 1715)
- date unknown –
  - Andrew Fletcher, Lord Milton, judge and Lord Justice Clerk (died 1776)
  - George Young, surgeon, physician, philosopher and empiric (died 1757)

== Deaths ==
- 20 March – George Douglas, 1st Earl of Dumbarton, nobleman and soldier (born 1635)
- 2 April – Sir John Lauder, 1st Baronet, baillie and Treasurer of the City of Edinburgh (born 1595)
- 14 May – Robert Kirk, minister, Gaelic scholar and folklorist (born 1644)
- 3 August –
  - Hugh Mackay, general, died at the Battle of Steenkerque (born c.1642)
  - James Douglas, Earl of Angus, nobleman and soldier, died at the Battle of Steenkerque (born 1671)

== See also ==
- Timeline of Scottish history
