= 1703 in Scotland =

- Centuries: 16th; 17th; 18th; 19th; 20th
- Decades: 1680s; 1690s; 1700s; 1710s; 1720s
- See also: List of years in Scotland; Timeline of Scottish history 1703 in: England • Wales • Elsewhere

Events from the year 1703 in the Kingdom of Scotland.

== Incumbents ==
- Monarch – Anne
- Secretary of State – James Douglas, 2nd Duke of Queensberry, jointly with George Mackenzie, 1st Viscount Tarbat

=== Law officers ===
- Lord Advocate – Sir James Stewart
- Solicitor General for Scotland – William Carmichael

=== Judiciary ===
- Lord President of the Court of Session – Lord North Berwick
- Lord Justice General – Lord Lothian until 15 February
- Lord Justice Clerk – Lord Prestonhall

== Events ==
- 13 April – Major-General David Colyear, Lord Portmore, is elevated to the style of Earl of Portmore in the Peerage of Scotland.
- 21 April – the Edinburgh "Company of Quenching of Fire", i.e., a fire brigade, is formed.
- 6 May – the last Parliament of Scotland formed in Edinburgh from the general election held the previous year.
- Acts of the Parliament of Scotland passed:
  - Peace and War Act 1703 (c. 6) (S)), providing that, following the death of Anne, Queen of Great Britain without direct heirs, no future monarch of Scotland and England can take Scotland to war without the explicit consent of its parliament.
  - Wine Act 1703 (c. 13 (S)), allowing Scots legally to import French wine.
  - Act of Security 1704 (c.3 (S)), allowing the Parliament to appoint a Protestant successor to the monarch in Scotland. Bill passed in September but royal assent refused by the Lord High Commissioner until 1704.
- Queen Anne revives the Order of the Thistle and creates other new titles in the Peerage of Scotland: Duke of Atholl, Duke of Douglas, Earl of Cromartie, Earl of Glasgow, Earl of Hopetoun, Earl of Rosebery, Earl of Stair, Viscount of Garnock, Viscount Mount Stuart and Viscount of Primrose.
- Martin Martin publishes A Description of the Western Islands of Scotland.

== Births ==
- 5 January – James Hamilton, 5th Duke of Hamilton (died 1743)

== Deaths ==
- 15 February – Robert Kerr, 1st Marquess of Lothian (born 1636)
- 6 May – John Murray, 1st Marquess of Atholl (born 1631)
- 25 September – Archibald Campbell, 1st Duke of Argyll, privy councillor (born 1658)

== See also ==
- Timeline of Scottish history
