= 1700 in Scotland =

- Centuries: 15th; 16th; 17th; 18th; 19th
- Decades: 1680s; 1690s; 1700s; 1710s; 1720s
- See also: List of years in Scotland; Timeline of Scottish history 1700 in: England • Wales • Elsewhere

Events from the year 1700 in the Kingdom of Scotland.

== Incumbents ==
- Monarch – William II
- Secretary of State – James Ogilvy, 1st Earl of Seafield, jointly with John Carmichael, 1st Earl of Hyndford

=== Law officers ===
- Lord Advocate – Sir James Stewart
- Solicitor General for Scotland – Sir Patrick Hume

=== Judiciary ===
- Lord President of the Court of Session – Lord North Berwick
- Lord Justice General – Lord Lothian
- Lord Justice Clerk – Lord Pollok

== Events ==
- 5 January – Moffat schoolteacher Robert Carmichael is scourged through the streets of Edinburgh and banished for killing a pupil during punishment for misbehaviour.
- 3 February – "Lesser Great Fire" around Parliament Close, Edinburgh, leaves 400 families homeless.
- 30 March – second Darien expedition abandoned.
- 19 April – Campbeltown is erected a royal burgh.
- Approximate date about which the independent pro-Union group later known as the Squadrone Volante forms around John Hay, 2nd Marquess of Tweeddale.
- Possible approximate date at which the last wolf in Scotland is shot, north of Brora in Sutherland.
- Scottish American settler Isaac Magoon establishes the town of Scotland, Connecticut.

== Births ==
- April – John Kennedy, 8th Earl of Cassilis (died 1759)
- 27 August – Charles Colyear, 2nd Earl of Portmore (died 1785)
- 11 September – James Thomson, poet (died 1748)

=== Full date unknown ===
- George Bogle of Daldowie, tobacco and sugar merchant and Rector of the University of Glasgow (died 1784)
- George Gilmer Sr., politician in the Colony of Virginia (died 1757)

== Deaths ==
- March – Andrew Bruce, bishop (year of birth unknown)
- 29 July – Prince William, Duke of Gloucester heir to the thrones of England, Scotland and Ireland (born 1689)
- 16 November – Jamie Macpherson, outlaw (born 1675)

== The arts ==
- An edition of the late 16th-century Scots poet Alexander Montgomerie's The Cherrie and the Slae is printed in Ulster.

== See also ==
- Timeline of Scottish history
