= 1693 in Scotland =

- Centuries: 15th; 16th; 17th; 18th; 19th
- Decades: 1670s; 1680s; 1690s; 1700s; 1710s
- See also: List of years in Scotland; Timeline of Scottish history 1693 in: England • Elsewhere

Events from the year 1693 in the Kingdom of Scotland.

== Incumbents ==
- Monarch – William II and Mary II
- Secretary of State – John Dalrymple, Master of Stair, jointly with James Johnston

=== Law officers ===
- Lord Advocate – Sir James Stewart
- Solicitor General for Scotland – ??

=== Judiciary ===
- Lord President of the Court of Session – Lord Stair
- Lord Justice General – Lord Lothian
- Lord Justice Clerk – Lord Ormiston

== Events ==
- 14 June – Parliament turns its attention to an 'Act for Encouraging of Forraigne Trade' – that would lead to the Darien Scheme
- Start of the "seven ill years" of famine in Scotland

== Births ==
date unknown –

- John Campbell, 4th Duke of Argyll, soldier and Member of Parliament (died 1770)

== Deaths ==
- 9 April – Walter Scott, Earl of Tarras, nobleman (born 1644)
- 15 May – John Hamilton, 2nd Lord Bargany, peer (born c.1640)

date unknown

- Alexander Fraser, 11th Lord Saltoun, peer (born 1604)
- George Munro, 1st of Newmore, soldier and member of parliament 1602)

== See also ==
- Timeline of Scottish history
