= 1696 in Scotland =

- Centuries: 15th; 16th; 17th; 18th; 19th
- Decades: 1670s; 1680s; 1690s; 1700s; 1710s
- See also: List of years in Scotland; Timeline of Scottish history 1696 in: England • Elsewhere

Events from the year 1696 in the Kingdom of Scotland.

== Incumbents ==
- Monarch – William II
- Secretary of State – James Johnston, until January or February; then John Murray, Earl of Tullibardine (from 15 January) jointly with James Ogilvy, 4th Earl of Findlater (from 5 February)

=== Law officers ===
- Lord Advocate – Sir James Stewart
- Solicitor General for Scotland – Sir Patrick Hume

=== Judiciary ===
- Lord President of the Court of Session – vacant??
- Lord Justice General – Lord Lothian
- Lord Justice Clerk – Lord Ormiston

== Events ==
- February – the Bank of Scotland opens for business
- 8 September – Education Act passed by parliament to establish schools in every parish in the country.
- Perth Academy founded.
- Famine in the Borders leads to a new wave of Scottish Presbyterian migration from Scotland to Ulster.

== Births ==
- 11 June – James Francis Edward Keith, soldier and Prussian field marshal (died 1758)
- 15 September – Sir Archibald Grant, 2nd Baronet, company speculator and Member of parliament for Aberdeenshire, 1722–1732 (died 1772)
- date unknown –
  - William Duff, 1st Earl Fife, peer (died 1763)
  - Henry Home, Lord Kames, advocate, judge, philosopher, writer and agricultural improver (died 1782)
  - John Lyon, 5th Earl of Strathmore and Kinghorne, peer, died at the Battle of Sheriffmuir in 1715
  - Anne O'Brien, 2nd Countess of Orkney, noblewoman, (died 1756)

== Deaths ==
- 2 August – Robert Campbell of Glenlyon, a commanding officer at the Massacre of Glencoe (born 1630)
- date unknown – Arthur Forbes, 1st Earl of Granard, soldier (born 1623)

== See also ==
- Timeline of Scottish history
