= Great Officers of State =

Traditional Officers of European Kingdoms

Government in medieval monarchies generally comprised the king's companions, later becoming the royal household, from which the officers of state arose. These officers initially had household and governmental duties. Later some of these officers became two: one serving state and one serving household. They were superseded by new officers, or were absorbed by existing officers. Many of the officers became hereditary and thus removed from practical operation of either the state or the household.

Especially in the Norman kingdoms these offices will have common characteristics. In the United Kingdom, the Great Officers of State are traditional ministers of The Crown who either inherit their positions or are appointed to exercise certain largely ceremonial functions or to operate as members of the government. Separate Great Officers of State exist for England and for Scotland, as well as formerly for Ireland. It was the same in the Kingdoms of Sicily and Naples. Many of the Great Officers became largely ceremonial because historically they were so influential that their powers had to be resumed by the Crown or dissipated.

== England ==
Initially, after the Norman Conquest, England adopted the officers from the Normandy Ducal court (which was modelled after the French court) with a steward, chamberlain and constable. Originally having both household and governmental duties, some of these officers later split into two counterparts in Great Officer of the State and officer of the royal household, while other offices were superseded by new offices or absorbed by existing offices. This was due to many of the offices becoming hereditary because of feudalistic practices, and thus removed from the practical operation of either the state or the Royal Household. The Great Officers then gradually expanded to cover multiple duties, and have now become largely ceremonial.

Order	Office	Current holder	Superseded by	Royal Household
1	Lord High Steward of England	— (Note: These roles are now permanently vacant, except for brief appointments during coronations, where they perform certain functions in the ceremony.)	—	Lord Steward of the Household
2	Lord High Chancellor of Great Britain; Lord High Chancellor of England (1068–1707)	Alex Norris	—	—
3	Lord High Treasurer of the United Kingdom; Lord High Treasurer of Great Britain (1714–1817); Lord High Treasurer of England (c. 1126–1714)	— (Note: The office of Lord High Treasurer of the United Kingdom has been vacant since 1714, and its powers and duties are exercised by the Lords Commissioners of His Majesty's Treasury, who hold the offices of Treasurer of the Exchequer of Great Britain and Lord High Treasurer of Ireland in commission. The office of Lord High Treasurer of Great Britain was held concurrently with that of Treasurer of the Exchequer of Great Britain.)	Prime Minister of the United Kingdom and First Lord of the Treasury; Chancellor and Under-Treasurer of His Majesty's Exchequer and Second Lord of the Treasury; Lords Commissioners of His Majesty's Treasury	—
4	Lord President of the Council	Sir Alan Campbell; MP for Tynemouth (Leader of the House of Commons)	—	—
5	Lord Keeper of the Privy Seal	Angela Smith; Baroness Smith of Basildon (Leader of the House of Lords)	—	—
6	Lord Great Chamberlain of England	In gross: (Note: Under a 1912 agreement, the office, or the right to appoint a person to exercise it, rotates among the heirs of the 1st Earl of Ancaster, the 4th Marquess of Cholmondeley, and the 1st Earl Carrington, changing at the start of each reign, with the Cholmondeleys serving every other reign, and the heirs of Ancaster and Carrington once every four reigns each.); Rupert Carington; 7th Baron Carrington	Lord High Treasurer (in monetary affairs)	Lord Chamberlain of the Household
7	Lord High Constable of England	— (Note: The office reverted to the Crown in 1512.)	Earl Marshal (in the command of troops)	Master of the Horse to His Majesty
8	Earl Marshal of England; Lord Marshal of England (1135–1386)	Edward Fitzalan-Howard; 18th Duke of Norfolk	—	Master of the Horse to His Majesty
9	Lord High Admiral of the United Kingdom; Lord High Admiral of Great Britain (1707–1800); Lord (High) (Note: The office was known as Lord Admiral of England until 1638, when 'High' was added.) Admiral of England (1512–1707); High Admiral of England, Ireland and Aquitaine (1385–1512)	— (Note: The office is currently held by the Sovereign himself.)	—	—

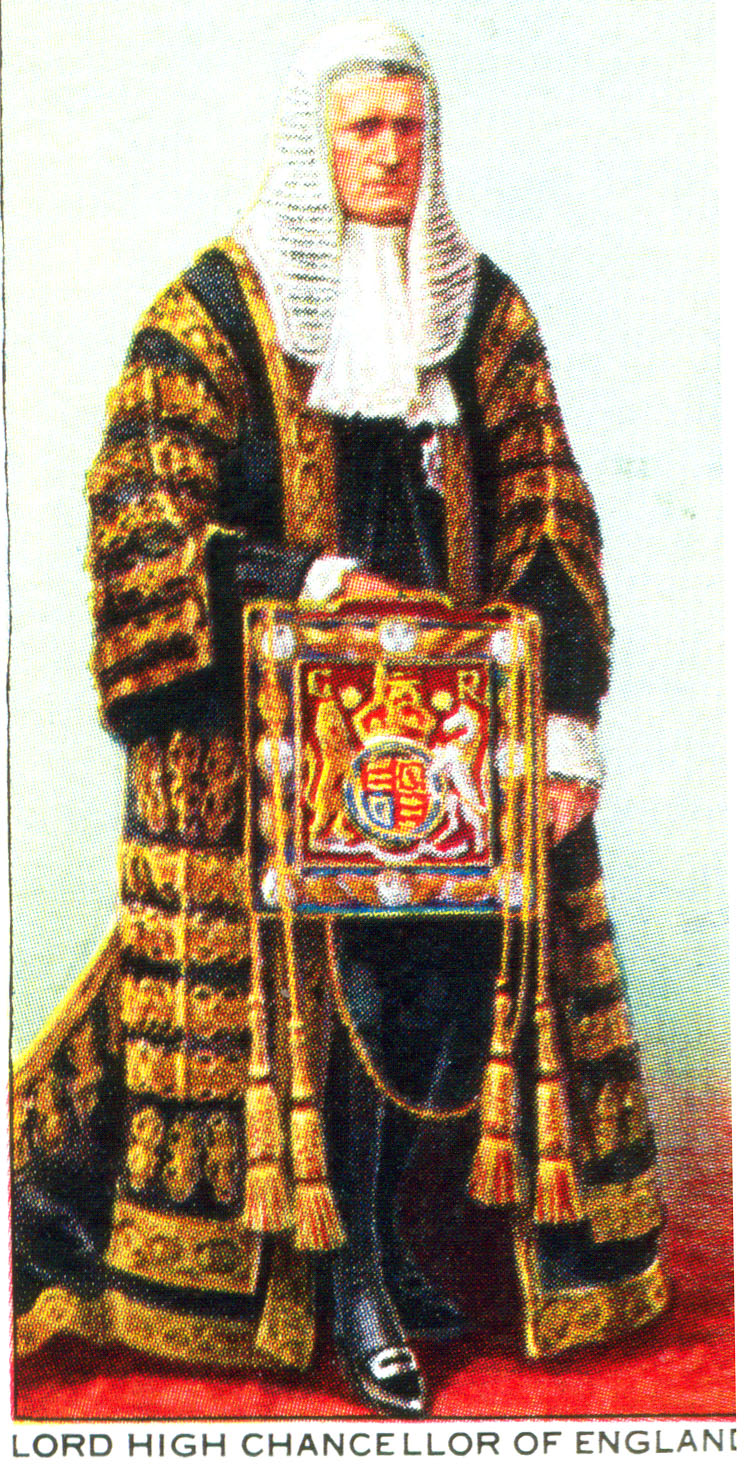
The Viscount Hailsham, robed as the Lord High Chancellor of Great Britain. He was the Lord High Steward at the last trial of a peer in the House of Lords.

== France ==
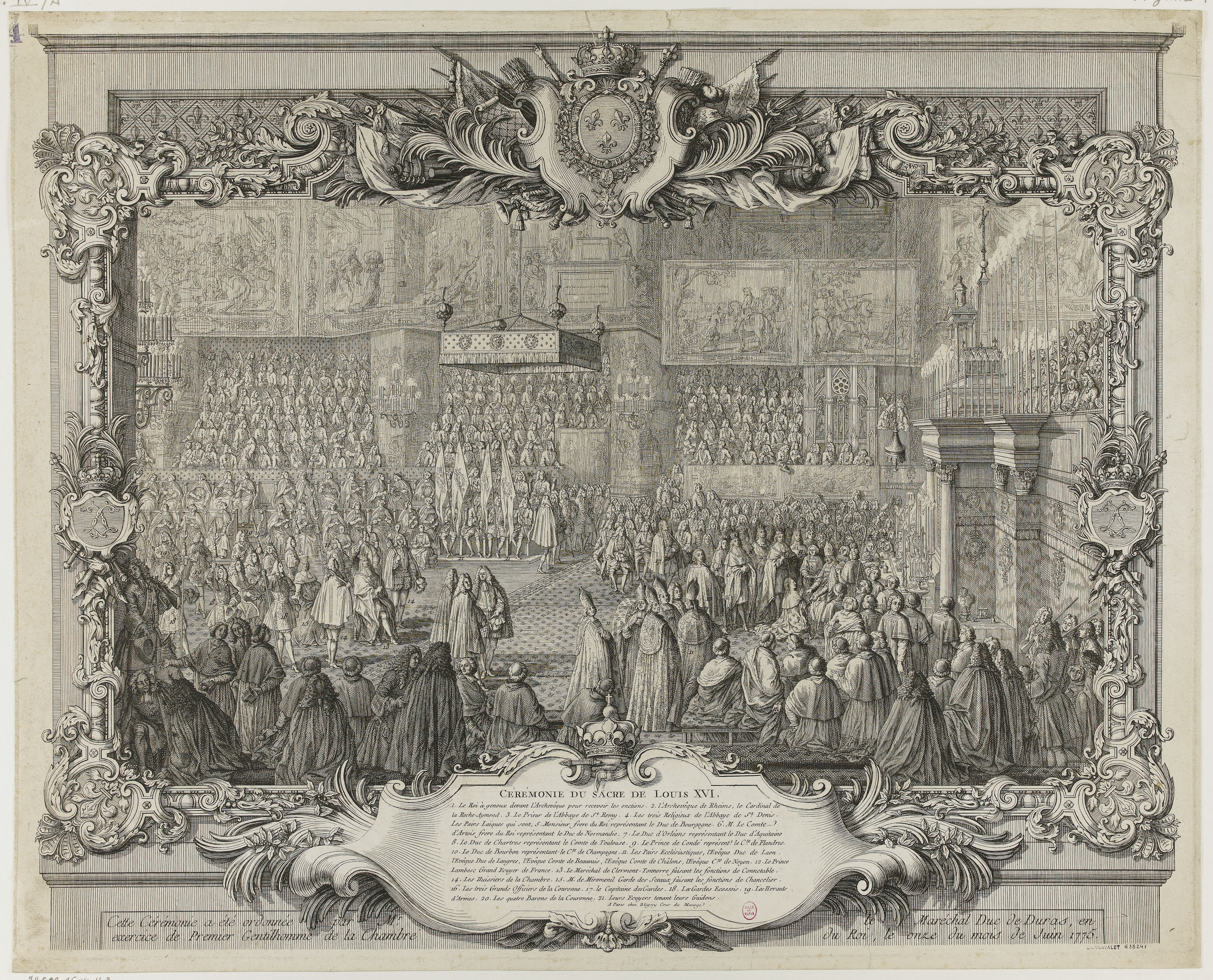
Depiction of the coronation of Louis XVI (1775). The three principal Great Officers of the Crown are circled and marked '16'; they were Henri Louis, Prince of Guéméné (Grand Chamberlain), Louis Joseph, Prince of Condé (Grand Master) and René Nicolas de Maupeou (Grand Chancellor).

The Great Officers of the Crown of France (French: Grands officiers de la couronne de France) were the most important officers of state in the French royal court during the Ancien Régime and Bourbon Restoration. They were appointed by the King of France, with all but the Keeper of the Seals being appointments for life. These positions were neither transmissible nor hereditary.

During the time of the First French Empire, the equivalent officers were known as the Grand Dignitaries of the French Empire. The Great Officers of the Crown of France should not be confused with the similarly named Great Officers of the Royal Household of France (Grands officiers de la maison du roi de France), which share certain officers, headed by the Grand Master of France.

== Holy Roman Empire ==
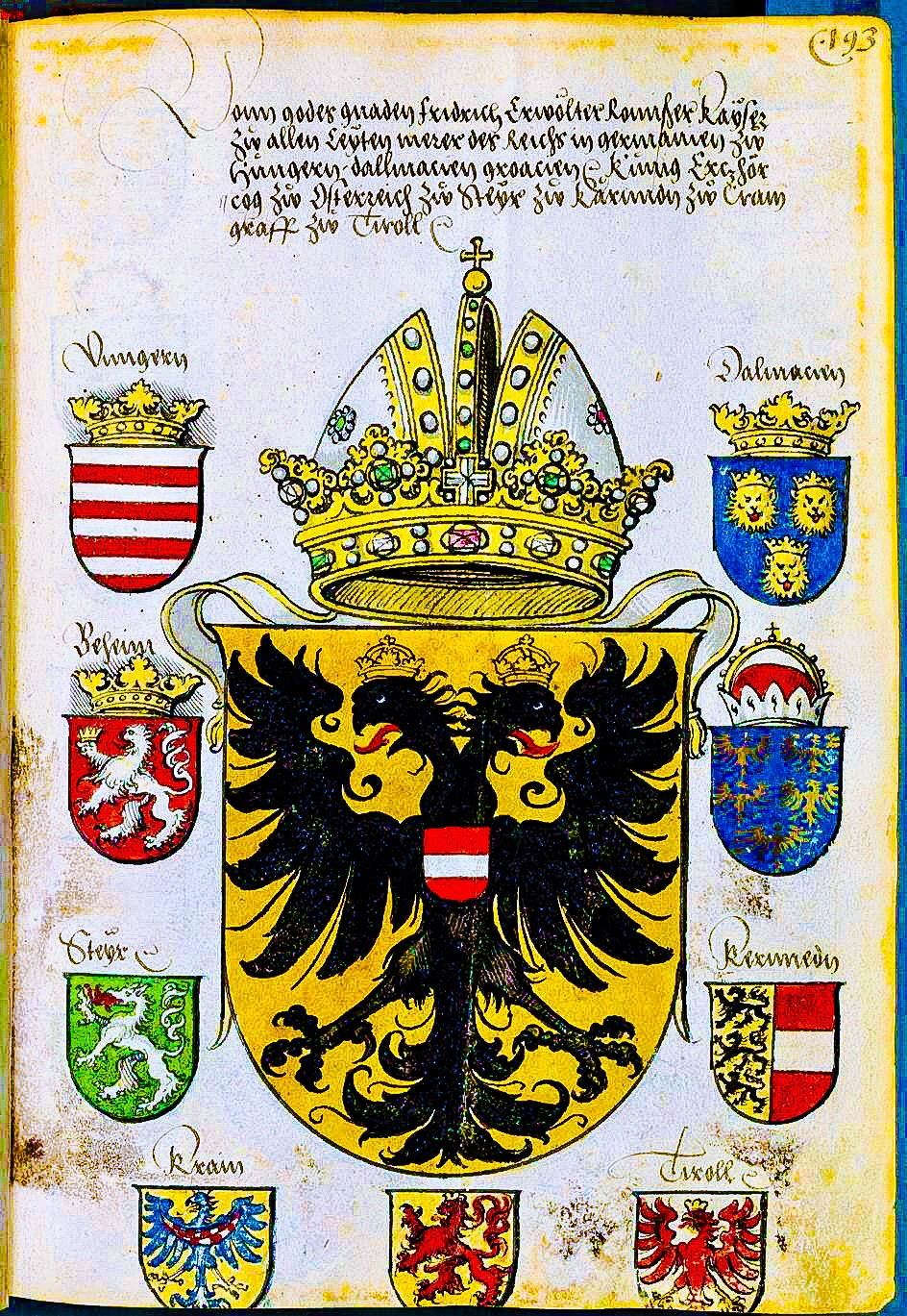
Page from an armorial showing the arms of Emperor Frederick III, c. 1415 – c. 1493

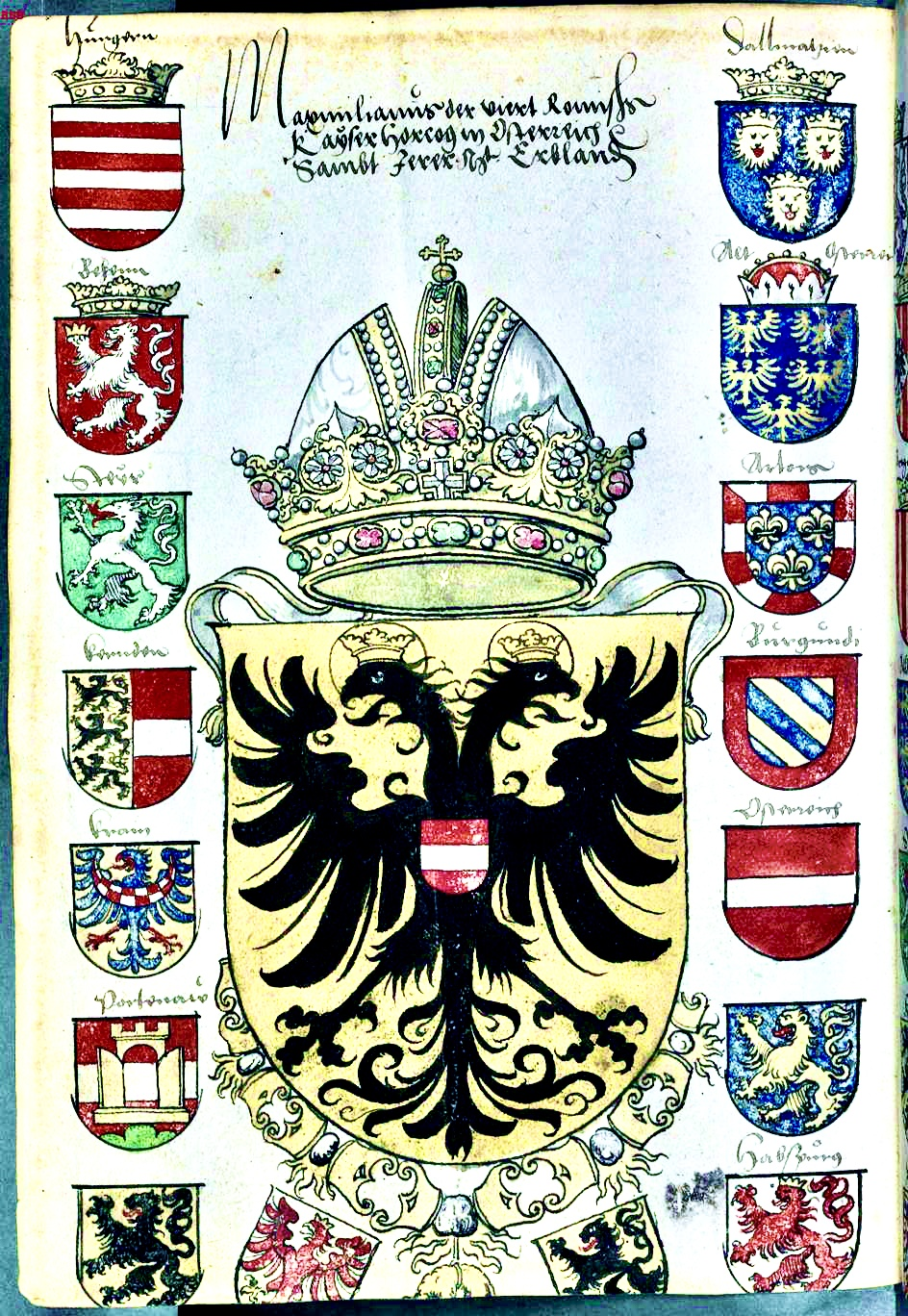
Page from an armorial showing arms of Kaiser Maximilian I, c. 1508 – c. 1519

German Kurrent script, in which the armorial sources are written

Princes elector held a "High Office of the Empire" (Reichserzämter) analogous to a modern Cabinet office and were members of the ceremonial Imperial Household. The three spiritual electors were Arch-Chancellors (German: Erzkanzler, Latin: Archicancellarius): the Archbishop of Mainz was Arch-Chancellor of Germany, the Archbishop of Cologne was Arch-Chancellor of Italy, and the Archbishop of Trier was Arch-Chancellor of Burgundy. The six remaining were secular electors, who were granted augmentations to their arms reflecting their position in the Household. These augments were displayed either as an inset badge, as in the case of the Arch Steward, Treasurer, and Chamberlain—or dexter, as in the case of the Arch Marshal and Arch Bannerbearer. Or, as in the case of the Arch Cupbearer, the augment was integrated into the escutcheon, held in the royal Bohemian lion's right paw.

Augmentation	Imperial office	German	Latin	Elector
	Arch-Cupbearer	Erzmundschenk	Archipincerna	King of Bohemia
	Arch-Steward (or Arch-Seneschal)	Erztruchseß	Archidapifer	Elector Palatine to 1623
	Arch-Steward (or Arch-Seneschal)	Erztruchseß	Archidapifer	Elector of Bavaria, 1623–1706
	Arch-Steward (or Arch-Seneschal)	Erztruchseß	Archidapifer	Elector Palatine, 1706–1714
	Arch-Steward (or Arch-Seneschal)	Erztruchseß	Archidapifer	Elector of Bavaria, 1714–1806
	Arch-Treasurer	Erzschatzmeister	Archithesaurarius	Elector Palatine, 1648–1706
	Arch-Treasurer	Erzschatzmeister	Archithesaurarius	Elector of Hanover, 1710–1714
	Arch-Treasurer	Erzschatzmeister	Archithesaurarius	Elector Palatine, 1714–1777
	Arch-Treasurer	Erzschatzmeister	Archithesaurarius	Elector of Hanover, 1777–1814
	Arch-Marshal	Erzmarschall	Archimarescallus	Elector of Saxony
	Arch-Chamberlain	Erzkämmerer	Archicamerarius	Elector of Brandenburg
	Arch-Bannerbearer	Erzbannerträger	Archivexillarius	Elector of Württemberg

== Hungary ==
In the Kingdom of Hungary the Great Officers of State were non-hereditary court officials originally appointed by the king, later some of them were elected by the Diet. They were also called the barons of the kingdom (Hungarian: országbárók, országnagyok) and lords banneret because they were obliged to lead their own Banderium (military unit) under their own banner in times of war. The offices gradually got separated from the role they originally fulfilled and their deputies took over the responsibilities.

Position	Officer	Hungarian	Latin
1	Palatine	nádor	palatinus, comes palatinus
2	Voivode of Transylvania	erdélyi vajda	voivoda Transsylvaniae
3	Judge royal	országbíró	judex curiae regiae
4	Ban of Croatia, Ban of Macsó, Ban of Szörény	horvát bán, macsói bán, szörényi bán	banus totius Sclavoniae
5	Master of the treasury	tárnokmester	magister tavarnicorum, magister tavernocorum regalium or summus camerarius
6	Master of the doorkeepers	Ajtónállómester	Janitorum regalium magister
7	Master of the stewards	asztalnokmester	dapiferorum regalium magister
8	Master of the cupbearers	pohárnokmester	pincernarum regalium magister
9	Master of the horse	lovászmester	agasonum regalium magister
10	Ispán of Pozsony County and Temes County	pozsonyi és temesi ispán	comes Posoniensis and comes Temesiensis
11	Royal treasurer	kincstartó	summus thesaurarius
12	Ispán of the Székelys	székelyek ispánja	comes Siculorum
13	Privy Chancellor	titkos kancellár	cancellarius aulicus

== Ireland ==
The office of Lord High Steward of Ireland is a hereditary position of Great Officer of State in the United Kingdom. Currently held by the Earl of Shrewsbury, it is sometimes referred to as the Hereditary Great Seneschal. While most of Ireland achieved independence in 1922, the title retains its original naming and scope rather than adjusting to reflect Northern Ireland as the sole portion of the province of Ulster remaining within the United Kingdom.

The title of Lord High Steward of Ireland was first bestowed in 1446 upon John Talbot, 1st Earl of Shrewsbury by way of letters patent from King Henry VI. He was named Earl of Waterford and granted the hereditary office of Lord High Steward, to be passed down through the male heirs of his line. The lineage has remained unbroken, and the current holder of the position is Charles Chetwynd-Talbot, 22nd Earl of Shrewsbury, tracing his right to the office directly back to that original royal charter over 570 years ago.

The office of Lord High Constable of Ireland was used during coronations of the monarch of the United Kingdom after the Acts of Union 1800. The office was abolished after the creation of the Irish Free State in 1922.

== Poland ==
The following dignitaries were permanent members of the council in the Crown of the Kingdom of Poland:

- Great Chancellor of the Crown
- Great Marshal of the Crown
- Great Treasurer of the Crown

== Scotland ==
The term "officer of state" is sometimes used loosely of any great office under the Crown. As in England, many offices are hereditary. A number of historical offices ended at, or soon after, the Treaty of Union 1707. There are also a number of Officers of the Crown and Great Officers of the Royal Household. These Officers of State were also called "Officers of the Crown" despite there being a separate group of officers so named that are not officers of state and, unlike the officers of state, did not sit or vote in meetings.

As of 2023, the Scottish Great Officers of State are as follows:

Order	Office	Holder during 1707	Current holder	Notes
Greater Officers of State
1	Lord High Chancellor	James Ogilvy; 1st Earl of Seafield	—	Merged with Lord High Chancellor of England in 1701 to form the office of Lord High Chancellor of Great Britain.
2	Lord High Treasurer (Lord High Treasurer, Comptroller, Collector-General, and Treasurer of the New Augmentation)	In commission: Commissioners of the Treasury of Scotland — James Ogilvy; 1st Earl of Seafield (Lord High Chancellor) David Boyle; 1st Earl of Glasgow (Treasurer-depute) The Honourable; Francis Montgomerie (Treasurer in Parliament)	—	Merged with Lord High Treasurer of England in 1701 to form the office of Lord High Treasurer of Great Britain.
3	Lord Keeper of the Privy Seal	James Douglas; 2nd Duke of Queensberry	—	Vacant since the death of Gavin Campbell, 1st Marquess of Breadalbane in 1921.
4	Secretary of State	Hugh Campbell; 3rd Earl of Loudoun John Erskine; 23rd and 6th Earl of Mar	—	Office abolished in 1709.
Lesser Officers of State
5	Lord Clerk Register	James Murray; Lord Philiphaugh	Elish Angiolini	Since 1817, also Keeper of the Signet in Scotland.
6	Lord Advocate (His Majesty's (Lord) (Note: The office of Lord Advocate is referred to as His Majesty's Lord Advocate in formal correspondence, though 'Lord' is dropped in some cases, such as case citations (for example, in [2020] UKSC 10, the office is referred to as His Majesty's Advocate, without 'Lord').) Advocate)	Sir James Stewart of Goodtrees	Ruth Charteris	—
7	Treasurer-depute	David Boyle; 1st Earl of Glasgow	—	Office abolished by the Acts of Union 1707.
8	Lord Justice Clerk	Adam Cockburn; Lord Ormiston	John Beckett; Lord Beckett	—
Abolished Officers of State
n/a	Comptroller of Scotland	—	—	Merged into the office of Lord High Treasurer of Scotland.
n/a	Master of Requests for Scotland	—	—	Merged into the office of Lord Secretary of Scotland.

== Sicily ==
=== History ===
In the Kingdom of Sicily, which existed from 1130 to 1816, the Great Officers were officials of the Crown who inherited an office or were appointed to perform some mainly ceremonial functions or to act as members of the government. In particular, it was a Norman king, Roger II, who once he became King of Sicily and conquered the territories of Southern Italy was concerned with organizing the Kingdom politically. For this reason, in 1140, King Roger convened a Parliament in Palermo where the seven most important offices of the Kingdom of Sicily were established, to which the title of archons was given.

The system has notable similarities with the English one, being both derived from Norman rulers, in which four of them had a certain correspondence with the officers of the court of the Franks, where there was a senescalk, a marchäl, a kämmerer, a kanzlèr; later reverted with the Great Officers of the Kingdom of France.

With the pragmatic sanction of November 6, 1569, on the reforms of the Courts, three Great Offices of the Kingdom are made the prerogative of the judiciary: the Great Chancellor by President of the Tribunal of the Sacred Royal Conscience; the Great Justiciar, whose functions had already been absorbed by President of the Tribunal of the Royal grand Court; and the Great Chamberlain by the President of the Tribunal of Royal Patrimony.

=== Officers of State ===
The Great Officers of State of the former Kingdom of Sicily, consisting of Sicily and Malta, were:

Position	Officer	First and last holder	Notes
1	Great Constable	Robert of Hauteville; Fabrizio Pignatelli d’Aragona, duke of Monteleone	The Gran Conestabile was the commander of the army, in charge of judging the cases of military relevance, he was the highest officer of the Kingdom
2	Great Admiral	George of Antioch; Diego Pignatelli, prince of Castelvetrano	The Grande Ammiraglio dit amiratus amiratorum was the commander of the Navy of the Kingdom of Sicily. For a short time the title of granted with that of Count of Malta. This office was by far the most influential as the Sicilian navy was among the most powerful Christian fleets during the Middle Ages in the Mediterranean
3	Great Chancellor	Guarin; marquess Antonio Ardizzone	The Gran Cancelliere kept and affixed the Seal of the Kingdom of Sicily. His functions could be compared to those of the Prime Minister and the Minister of Foreign Affairs. During the Hauteville’s dynasty most of the chancellors were ecclesiastics. From 1569 until 1816 the office was held ex officio by the President of the Tribunal of the Sacred Royal Conscience, the high-instance court
4	Great Justiciar	Robert of Rocca; Giovanni Battista Asmundo e Paternò	The Gran Giustiziere was the most senior judge and the head of the judiciary. Peter II made the office hereditary first to the Count of Mistretta and second to the Count of Agosta until the reform of 1569. From that date until 1816 the office was held ex officio by the President of the Tribunal of the Royal grand Court, the civil court
5	Great Chamberlain	Richard of Mandra, Count of Molise; knight Michele Perremuto	The Gran Camerario had the role of treasurer, in fact he watched over the administration of public expenditure. The office soon became hereditary as prerogative of the Count of Geraci. From 1569 until 1816 the office was held ex officio by the President of the Tribunal of Royal Patrimony
6	Great Prothonotary	Matthew of Ajello; Alfonso Ruiz (?)	The Gran Protonotaro was the notary of the Crown and secretary of the Sacred Royal Council and of the Parliament, the prothonotary had extensive functions in administrative matters and was the head of all notaries of the Kingdom. He had also particular skills in matters of feudal ceremony and investitures. The office was also a registering body for royal acts similar to the chancery
7	Great Seneschal	Richard of Hauteville; Prince Francesco Statella, marquess of Spaccaforno	The Gran Siniscalco supervised the Royal Palace, providing the King and the court with provisions, supervising the royal forests, and hunting reserves. He was the Judge of the Royal House and its subordinate officers. In 1296 the office soon became hereditary as prerogative of the Count of Modica and it was later inherited by Marquess of Spaccaforno

== Sweden ==
The Great Officers of the Realm (Swedish: de högre riksämbetsmännen) were the five leading members of the Swedish Privy Council from the later parts of the 16th century to around 1680. With the constitution of 1634, the five officers became heads of five different branches of government (kollegium). The same constitution also declared that the great officers were to act as regents during the minorities of kings or regnal queens. All great officers of the realm were abolished by king Charles XI of Sweden. The Lord High Steward and the Lord High Chancellor offices were revived in the late 18th century, but were soon removed again.

== See also ==
- Great Offices of State
- Royal Households of the United Kingdom
- Kingdom of England
- Great Officers of the Crown of France
- Kingdom of France
- Holy Roman Empire
- Great Officers of State of Ireland
- Kingdom of Ireland
- Kingdom of Poland
- Kingdom of Scotland
- Kingdom of Sicily
- Great Officers of Sweden
- Kingdom of Sweden
