= 1695 in Scotland =

- Centuries: 15th; 16th; 17th; 18th; 19th
- Decades: 1670s; 1680s; 1690s; 1700s; 1710s
- See also: List of years in Scotland; Timeline of Scottish history 1695 in: England • Elsewhere

Events from the year 1695 in the Kingdom of Scotland.

== Incumbents ==
- Monarch – William II
- Secretary of State – John Dalrymple, Master of Stair (until dismissed after Glencoe enquiry), jointly with James Johnston

=== Law officers ===
- Lord Advocate – Sir James Stewart
- Solicitor General for Scotland – ??

=== Judiciary ===
- Lord President of the Court of Session – Lord Stair (died in November)
- Lord Justice General – Lord Lothian
- Lord Justice Clerk – Lord Ormiston

== Events ==
- 2 July – 1 September – Scottish regiments are involved in the Siege of Namur
- 17 July – Parliament passes the act to establish the Bank of Scotland
- Carron Bridge built

== Births ==
- 1 August – John Rutherford, physician and professor at the University of Edinburgh Medical School (died 1779)
- 5 October – John Glas, clergyman, originator of the Glasite church movement (died 1773)
- 4 November – John Erskine of Carnock, jurist and professor of Scottish law at the University of Edinburgh (died 1768)
- undated – John Hay, 4th Marquess of Tweeddale, nobleman, politician, Secretary of State for Scotland, Governor of Bank of Scotland (died 1772)
- approximate date – Donald Cameron of Lochiel, Jacobite clan chief (died 1748 in France)

== Deaths ==
- 28 March – William Douglas, 1st Duke of Queensberry, politician (born 1637)
- 13 April – James Drummond bishop (born 1629)
- 15 May – Patrick Lyon, 3rd Earl of Strathmore and Kinghorne, peer (born 1643)
- 29 November – James Dalrymple, 1st Viscount of Stair, lawyer and statesman (born 1619)

== See also ==
- Timeline of Scottish history
