= 1698 in Scotland =

- Centuries: 15th; 16th; 17th; 18th; 19th
- Decades: 1670s; 1680s; 1690s; 1700s; 1710s
- See also: List of years in Scotland; Timeline of Scottish history 1698 in: England • Elsewhere

Events from the year 1698 in the Kingdom of Scotland.

== Incumbents ==
- Monarch – William II
- Secretary of State – John Murray, Earl of Tullibardine (until 31 March 1698), jointly with James Ogilvy, 1st Earl of Seafield

=== Law officers ===
- Lord Advocate – Sir James Stewart
- Solicitor General for Scotland – Sir Patrick Hume

=== Judiciary ===
- Lord President of the Court of Session – vacant?? until 17 March, then Lord North Berwick
- Lord Justice General – Lord Lothian
- Lord Justice Clerk – Lord Ormiston

== Events ==
- Famine in the Borders leads to continued Scottish Presbyterian migration from Scotland to Ulster.
- 14 July – first expedition sets sail as part of the Darien scheme.
- November – colony of New Caledonia established on the Isthmus of Panama.

== Births ==
- February – Colin Maclaurin, mathematician (died 1746)
- 11 July – George Turnbull, philosopher, theologian, teacher and writer (died 1748)

date unknown

- Alasdair mac Mhaighstir Alasdair, Gaelic poet (died 1770)
- Charles Douglas, 3rd Duke of Queensberry, landowner, Privy Counsellor and Vice Admiral of Scotland (died 1778)
- John Gow, pirate (executed in London 1725)

== Deaths ==
- John Leslie, 10th Earl of Rothes, Army officer (died 1767)

== See also ==
- Timeline of Scottish history
