= John Cockburn (Scottish politician) =

Scottish landowner and politician (1679 - 1758)

- Born: c. 1679; Ormiston, East Lothian
- Died: 12 November 1758 (aged 78–79); Navy Office, London, England
- Occupations: landowner and politician
- Political party: Parliament of Scotland
- Father: Lord Justice Clerk

John Cockburn (/ˈkoʊbərn/ KOH-bərn; c. 1679 – 12 November 1758) of Ormiston, East Lothian, was a Scottish landowner and politician who sat in the Parliament of Scotland from 1702 to 1707 and as a Whig in the British House of Commons for 34 years from 1707 to 1741.

== Life ==
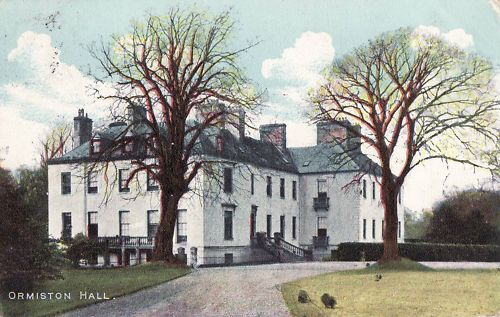
Ormiston Hall, prior to the WWII fire which left it in ruins

Cockburn was the son of Adam Cockburn of Ormiston, Lord Justice Clerk, from whom he inherited the Ormiston estate in 1735. In 1736 he laid out the "model village" of Ormiston which was set up to encourage craft industries such as brewing, distilling and weaving. However, this, and his improvements to the estate as a whole, bankrupted Cockburn, and he was forced to sell the entire estate and village to the Charles Hope, the Earl of Hopetoun.

He is known as the father of Scottish husbandry.

In 1702, Cockburn became a Shire Commissioner for Haddington in the Parliament of Scotland and took an active interest in accomplishing the union. He was the first representative of East Lothian in the parliament of the United Kingdom of Great Britain. He continued to hold that seat in all successive parliaments until 1741. He was one of the Lords Commissioners of the Admiralty.

Cockburn built Ormiston Hall on his estate at Ormiston. This last Cockburn of Ormiston was an enthusiastic entrepreneur and eventually ruined himself as a result of which his estates were sold to the Earl of Hopetoun.

Cockburn died in his son's house in the Navy Office, London, England. He had firstly married Beatrix, daughter of John Carmichael, 1st Earl of Hyndford, by whom he had no issue and secondly married Arabella Rowe, the youngest daughter and coheiress of Anthony Rowe (c.1641-1704) of Muswell Hill, Middlesex, MP, with whom he had a son. His natural son, George Cockburne (d.1770), was a captain in the Royal Navy, and married Caroline, daughter of Lt-Col. George Forrester, 5th Lord Forrester of Corstorphine (husband of Charlotte Rowe, elder sister of Arabella Rowe), with female issue.

Parliament of Scotland
Preceded by Sir Robert Sinclair; Sir John Lauder; William Morison; William Hepburn	Shire Commissioner for Haddington; 1702–1707; With: Sir John Lauder; Andrew Fletcher; William Nisbet	Succeeded by Parliament of Great Britain
Parliament of Great Britain
New parliament	Member of Parliament for Scotland; 1707–1708	Constituency split
New constituency	Member of Parliament for Haddingtonshire; 1708–1741	Succeeded by Lord Charles Hay
