= 1694 in Scotland =

- Centuries: 15th; 16th; 17th; 18th; 19th
- Decades: 1670s; 1680s; 1690s; 1700s; 1710s
- See also: List of years in Scotland; Timeline of Scottish history 1694 in: England • Elsewhere

Events from the year 1694 in the Kingdom of Scotland.

== Incumbents ==
- Monarch – William II jointly with Mary II until 28 December, then as sole monarch.
- Secretary of State – John Dalrymple, Master of Stair, jointly with James Johnston

=== Law officers ===
- Lord Advocate – Sir James Stewart
- Solicitor General for Scotland – ??

=== Judiciary ===
- Lord President of the Court of Session – Lord Stair
- Lord Justice General – Lord Lothian
- Lord Justice Clerk – Lord Ormiston

== Events ==
- 7 September – Thomas Joseph Nicolson is nominated titular bishop of Peristasis and first Vicar Apostolic of Scotland
- October 19 – A major windstorm continues for several days, spreading the Culbin Sands over a large area of farmland, in the County of Moray. The village of Culbin was buried and abandoned.

== Births ==
- 4 October – Lord George Murray, Jacobite general (died 1760)
- 15 October – Archibald Douglas, 1st Duke of Douglas, nobleman (died 1761)

date unknown

- Sir Robert Douglas, 6th Baronet, genealogist (died 1760)

== Deaths ==
- 18 April – William Douglas, Duke of Hamilton, nobleman, summoned the Convention of Edinburgh which offered the Scottish crown to William and Mary in March 1689 (born 1634)
- 25 July – Robert Fleming, Presbyterian minister (born 1630)
- 28 December – Queen Mary II of England and Scotland (born 1662)

== See also ==
- Timeline of Scottish history
