= Patrick Hepburn =

Patrick Hepburn may refer to:

- Patrick Hepburn (bishop) (died 1573), notorious Scottish prelate, bishop of Moray and Commendator of Scone
- Patrick Hepburn, 1st Lord Hailes (died 1483), Scottish baron and parliamentary peer
- Patrick Hepburn, 1st Earl of Bothwell (died 1508), Scottish noble
- Patrick Hepburn, 3rd Earl of Bothwell (died 1556), Scottish noble
- Patrick Hepburn of Waughton, Scottish laird
