= William Morison (1663–1739) =

William Morison (1663–1739), of Prestongrange, Haddington, was a Scottish politician who sat in the Parliament of Scotland from 1690 to 1707 and in the British House of Commons as a Whig between 1707 and 1715.

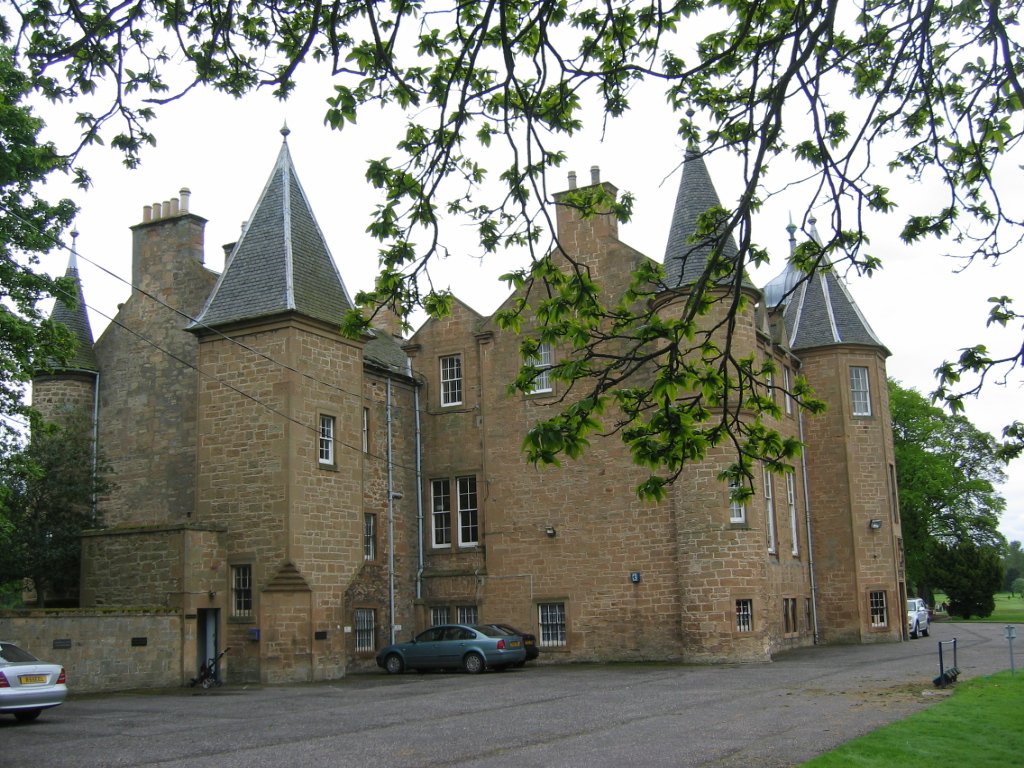
Prestongrange House

Morison was baptized on 19 April 1663, the second, but eldest surviving son of Sir Alexander Morison, of Prestongrange and his wife Jean Boyd, daughter of Robert Boyd, 7th Lord Boyd His father was the owner of many business ventures and sometime Commissioner in the Parliament of Scotland. Morison's marriage with Janet Rocheid daughter of John Rocheid of Craigleith, Edinburgh, who was under-age, was brought about by his father. Though the couple had an understanding for some time the threat of a rival claimant made the situation urgent, and the couple disappeared to Berwick where the marriage took place in 1676 and stayed there until the spouse reached her twelfth birthday. Though the marriage was then legal, those responsible were fined a total of 10,000 merks. William Morison was liable for 1,500 merks and was to be sent to prison until it was paid. In 1683, Morison succeeded to the family property and diverse businesses on the death of his father. These included the second largest saltworks in the area and local coal reserves. He was interested in improving a harbour near Prestonpans, known as Newhaven or Aitcheson's Haven. He also became hereditary burgess of Peebles and a burgess of Edinburgh in 1684,

During the 1689 Revolution, Morison served as a commissioner of militia. In 1690, he was returned as Shire Commissioner for Haddingtonshire. He acted consistently with the Court. In 1696 he invested the sizable sum of £1,000 in the Company of Scotland which supported the Darien scheme to found the colony of Caledonia in the Panama area. By 1700 the scheme had failed and investors lost their money. This soured Morison's support for the court. In 1702 he was returned as Shire Commissioner for Peeblesshire. He remained with the ‘rump’ of courtiers in 1702 and became a supporter of the Duke of Queensbury sticking with him when he fell out of favour in 1704. When Queensbury was re-instated, he rewarded Morison with the post as a Commissioner for the union with England in 1706 and promoted him to Scottish Privy Councillor in 1707.

After the union in 1707, Morison was one of the Scottish representatives to the first Parliament of Great Britain as Member of Parliament for Scotland. He was appointed on 10 November 1707 to the committee on the Address. At the 1708 British general election, he was returned as MP for Peeblesshire and his main aim was to secure a private bill for improving the harbour near Prestonpans, which had become known as Morison's Haven. However he encountered opposition which rendered progress with the bill impossible. He supported the Court over the impeachment of Dr Sacheverell and generally supported Whig principles. At the 1710 British general election, he was defeated by a considerable majority. At the 1713 British general election, he stood for Peeblesshire and for Sutherlandshire, on the interest of Lord Sutherland. Having regained Peeblesshire, he vacated the other seat. He suffered domestic and financial pressures with the death of his wife in 1713 and increasing financial difficulties which affected his Parliamentary performance. His only recorded vote was on 12 May 1714 in favour of extending the schism bill to cover Catholic education. He did not stand again for Parliament in 1715,

Morison married an illegitimate daughter of Sir John Germain, 1st Baronet before 1 May 1718. His indebtedness continued to increase. His father had left him debts and the businesses had gone sour. He may have lost money gambling and, by 1733, he was made a close prisoner of the Fleet Prison and his estates were sequestrated. Coincidentally, he held a bond whose security was guaranteed by duties on goods passing via Fleet River. By this time the Fleet had become silted up and an Act was obtained for reclaiming the Fleet ditch as building land. Morison submitted a petition from Fleet Prison to save his investment and was thereby enabled to obtain release from prison.

Morison died abroad in 1739, leaving many creditors. He and his first wife had five sons, of whom only one survived, and three daughters - their son received his mother's inheritance of Craigleith. The rest of Morison's property including the saltworks at Morison's Haven and Prestongrange were sold off.

Parliament of Scotland
Preceded by Adam Cockburn; Sir Robert Sinclair	Shire Commissioner for Haddingtonshire; 1690–1703; With: Sir John Lauder; William Hepburn of Beinstoun	Succeeded by Andrew Fletcher; Sir John Lauder; William Nisbet
Preceded by Sir Alexander Murray	Shire Commissioner for Peeblesshire; 1702–1707	Succeeded by Parliament of Great Britain
Parliament of Great Britain
New parliament	Member of Parliament for Scotland; 1707–1708	Constituency split
New constituency	Member of Parliament for Peeblesshire; 1708–1710	Succeeded by Alexander Murray
Preceded by Alexander Murray	Member of Parliament for Peeblesshire; 1713–1715	Succeeded by Alexander Murray
