= East Lothian (disambiguation) =

East Lothian may refer to:

- East Lothian, a historic county and council area in Scotland
- East Lothian (Commonwealth Parliament constituency), prior to 1707
- East Lothian (UK Parliament constituency)
- East Lothian (Scottish Parliament constituency)

== See also ==
- Berwick and East Lothian (UK Parliament constituency)
