= Sir Alexander Murray, 3rd Baronet =

Scottish baronet and politician

Sir Alexander Murray, 3rd Baronet (after 1684 – 18 May 1743) was a Scottish baronet and politician. He was a son of Sir David Murray (1659–1729) and his first wife, Anne Bruce.

Arms of Murray of Stanhope: 1 and 4. Argent, a hunting horn sable, garnished gules; on a chief azure three mullets of the field. 2. Azure, three fraises argent. 3. Argent, on a chief gules three cushions or.

Alexander Murray was the Member of Parliament (MP) for Peeblesshire from 1710 to 1713.

On 16 August 1710 he married Grizel Baillie (1692–1759), the elder daughter of Lady Grisell Baillie of Jerviswood and George Baillie. Although this was a love match, it was a disaster. After the couple had lived a few miserable months under her father's roof, Murray made himself a ‘voluntary outcast’. There was a brief reconciliation in 1711–12, when he was accepted back into the Baillie household, but his behaviour led to a process for separation being instituted against him, and its completion in 1714 seems to have unbalanced him still further.

Murray took up arms in the cause of the Old Pretender in the Jacobite Rising of 1715 and was subsequently imprisoned at Marshalsea until 1717. After his release, he took an interest in the exploitation of mineral deposits on land his father had purchased in Ardnamurchan, ran up substantial debts and lived for a time in France. In 1735, on learning of the death of George Baillie, he returned to Scotland and engaged in correspondence with the Baillie family seeking financial compensation for defamation of character and erasure of the deed of separation.

In 1735, Murray wrote a whimsical proposal for the economic development of the island of St. Kilda.

In 1740, he published a collection of discussion documents, with the overall title The True Interest of Great Britain, Ireland and our Plantations: or, a Proposal for Making such a Union between Great Britain and Ireland, and all our Plantations, as that already made betwixt Scotland and England. etc.

== In fiction ==
Sir Alexander Murray of Stanhope features as a character in Andrew Drummond's fantasy novel The Books of the Incarceration of the Lady Grange (2016),ISBN 9781530077687.

Parliament of Great Britain
Preceded by William Morison	Member of Parliament for Peeblesshire; 1710–1713	Succeeded by William Morison
Baronetage of Nova Scotia
Preceded by David Murray	Baronet (of Stanhope); 1729–1743	Succeeded by David Murray
