= William Scott, Lord Clerkington =

Scottish politician and judge

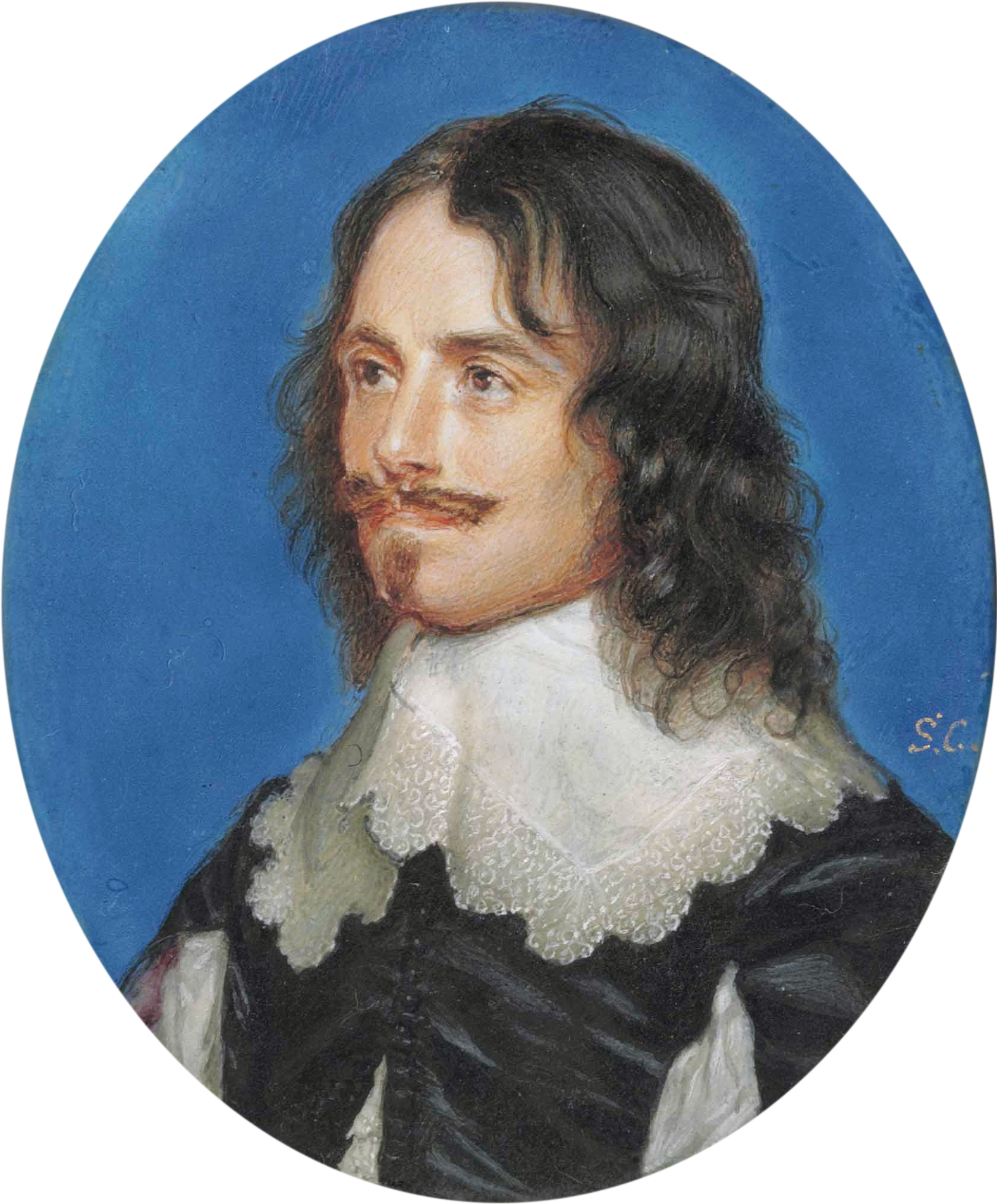
William Scott, later Lord Clerkington (Samuel Cooper)

Sir William Scott, Lord Clerkington (died 1656) was a Scottish politician and judge. Scott owned Malleny House and Garden which later passed to several generations of his descendants via his son John.

== Life ==
He was the eldest son of Laurence Scott of Harprig, an advocate, clerk to the privy council, and one of the clerks of the Court of Session. In November 1641 he was knighted by King Charles I of England. Like his father, he was one of the clerks of session.

In 1628 his father bought the estate of Clerkington, just west of Haddington from Richard Cockburne of Clerkington. William inherited it around 1635.

Due to the enactment of the act of classes, which made it impossible for those who took part in the engagement on behalf of Charles I to hold office, Scott was in June 1649 appointed an ordinary lord of session with the title of Lord Clerkington. In 1645 he had been chosen to represent Haddingtonshire in parliament, and in 1650 was chosen a commissioner for the Edinburghshire. He was also one of the committee of estates, and took a prominent part in affairs at the period of Charles II's recall to Scotland in June 1650.

Scott died on 23 December 1656.

== Family ==
In October 1621 he married his first wife, Catherine Morison, a daughter of Alexander Morison, Lord Preston Grange. Scott had one son, Laurence; and by his second wife, Barbara, daughter of Sir John Dalmahoy of Dalmahoy, bart., he had three sons and three daughters. The sons were:

- John, who succeeded his brother Laurence, obtained from his father in patrimony the lands and barony of Malleny, and was the ancestor of the Scotts of Malleny;
- James of Scotsloch; and
- Robert, dean of Hamilton.

== Notes ==
Attribution

This article incorporates text from a publication now in the public domain: Lee, Sidney, ed. (1897). "Scott, William (d.1656)". Dictionary of National Biography. Vol. 51. London: Smith, Elder & Co.
