= Ormiston Yew =

Individual yew tree in Ormiston, Scotland

The Ormiston Yew is first mentioned in text in 1474. It is a layering yew, and is thought to be one of the most significant examples in Scotland. It is located in Ormiston, Scotland

== Photo gallery ==
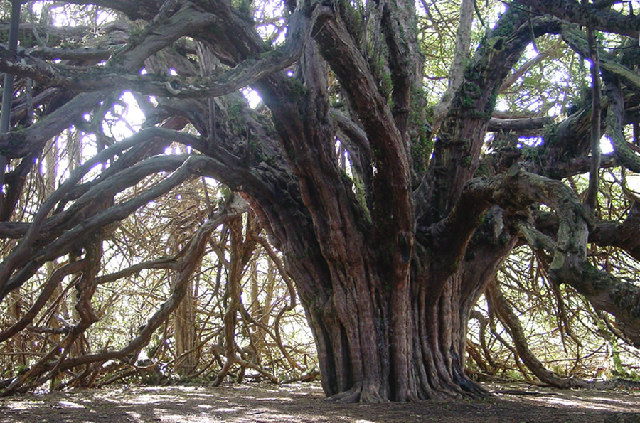
Situated just outside Ormiston, one of Scotland's few ancient layering yews
