= Company of Scotland =

Scottish trading company

Company of Scotland Trading to Africa and the Indies
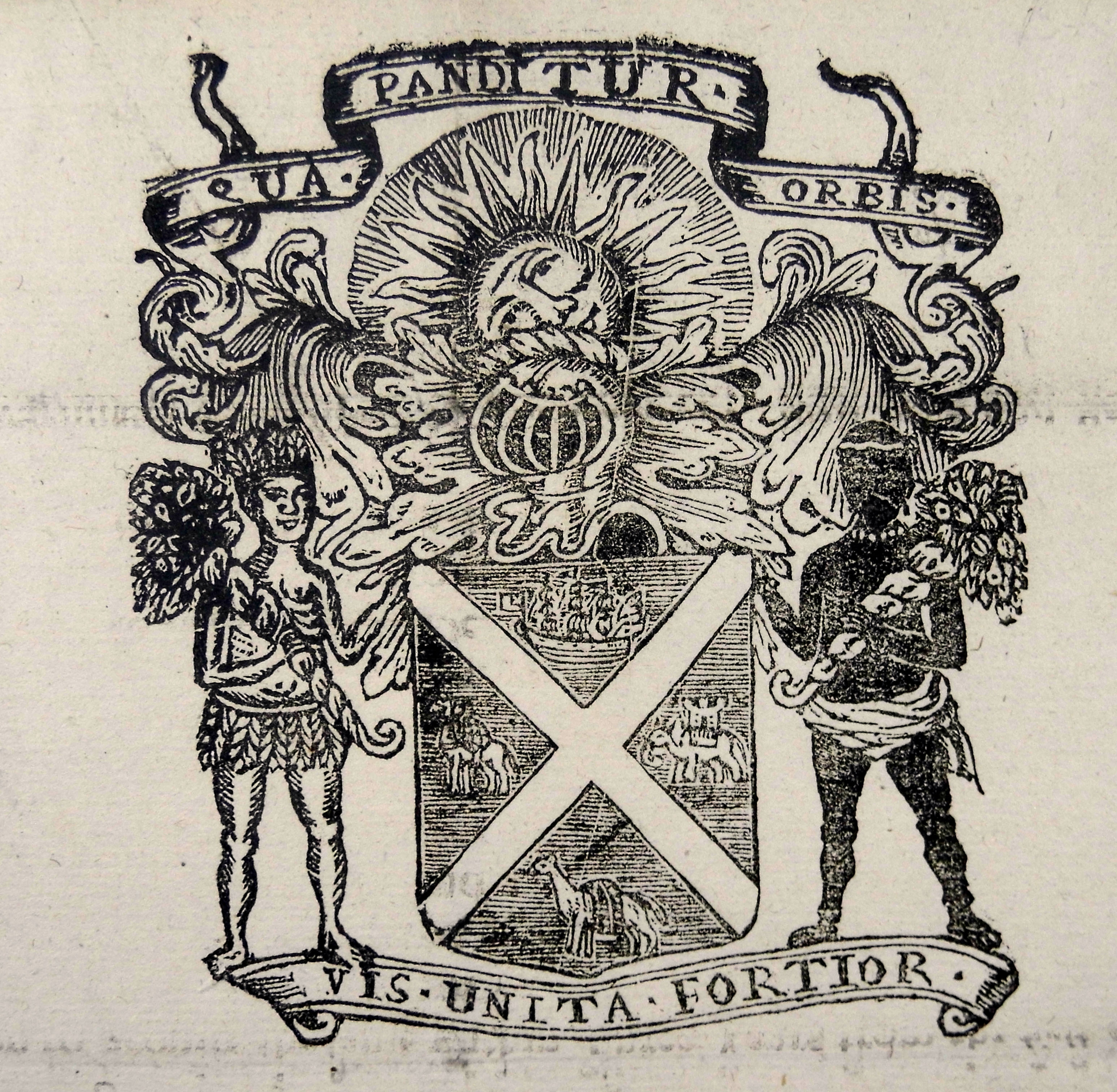
- Arms of the company
- Type: Joint-stock company
- Industry: International trade
- Founded: 26 June 1695
- Defunct: 1 May 1707
- Fate: Dissolved
- Headquarters: Edinburgh, Scotland
- Key people: John Hamilton, 2nd Lord Belhaven and Stenton; Adam Cockburn, Lord Ormiston; John Maxwell, Lord Pollok; William Paterson

The Company of Scotland Trading to Africa and the Indies, also called the Scottish Darien Company, was an overseas trading company created by an act of the Parliament of Scotland in 1695. The act granted the company a monopoly of Scottish trade to India, Africa and the Americas, extraordinary sovereign rights and 21 years of exemptions from taxation.

Financial and political troubles plagued its early years. The court of directors was divided between those residing and meeting in Edinburgh and those in London, amongst whom were both Scots and English. They were also divided by business intentions; some intended to trade in India and on the African coast, as an effective competitor to the English East India Company, while others were drawn to William Paterson's Darien scheme, which ultimately failed.

In July 1698 the company launched its first expedition, led by Paterson, who hoped to establish a colony in Darien (on the Isthmus of Panama), which could then be used as a trading point between Europe and the Far East. Though five ships and 1,200 Scottish colonists landed successfully in Darien, the settlement was poorly provisioned and eventually abandoned. A second, larger expedition (launched before the fate of the first was known) took up the deserted settlement, but was quickly besieged by the Spanish. More than a thousand succumbed to hunger and disease, and in April 1700, two ships carried the few survivors home.

In 1700–01 the Company sent further expeditions to Java and China, but suffered shipwrecks at Malacca and seizure of cargo by pirates at Madagascar. The company was involved in the Indian Ocean slave trade between 1698 and 1708.

== Founding ==
Company of Scotland Act 1695
- Act of Parliament
- Parliament of Scotland
- Long title: Act for a Company Tradeing to Affrica and the Indies.
- Citation: 1695 c. 10; 12mo ed: c. 8

Dates
- Royal assent: 26 June 1695

Other legislation
- Repealed by: Statute Law Revision (Scotland) Act 1906

Status: Repealed

On 26 June 1695 the Parliament of Scotland passed the Company of Scotland Act 1695 (c. 10), Act for a Company Tradeing to Affrica and the Indies, establishing the Company of Scotland trading to Africa and the Indies. The subscription book of the Company of Scotland was opened in Edinburgh on 26 February 1696, inviting investments from a minimum of £100 up to a maximum of £3,000. Such was the popularity of the scheme that on the first day alone 69 subscriptions were taken, worth £50,400. A second book was open in Glasgow between 5 March and 22 April. Although attempts to raise funds in London, Hamburg and Amsterdam had been blocked, by the beginning of August 1696 the full target of £400,000 sterling had been reached.

When the Company of Scotland was first formed, it was managed by its promoters, whose key task was to encourage subscriptions to the company. Once the subscription target of £400,000 sterling had been reached, however, the company required a more formal management structure. On 3 April 1696 a general meeting of subscribers elected a committee of twenty from their number to work with the promoters to establish rules and a constitution. By the middle of the month they had agreed that the company would be managed by a court of directors and a council general. The court of directors was to be an elected body with a maximum of fifty members, with each £1,000 of stock entitling its holder to one vote in the election. Twenty-five members would be elected by the subscribers, with up to a further twenty-five being elected by the first twenty-five. Subscribers with a holding of £1,000 or more could stand for election. A different director was to act as president of the court at each meeting. The first court of twenty-five directors was elected by shareholders on 12 May 1696. Candidates for election had to own at least £1,000 of company stock and so a limited number of shareholders, 119 out of a total of 1,320 (1,267 individuals and 53 institutions), were eligible to become directors. The court's directors came from across Scotland's wealthy classes, comprising two nobles, eight merchants and 15 lairds. Shortly afterwards, the first twenty-five directors appointed William Paterson and three others as additional directors. From July 1696 the court of directors met in the company's offices in Mylne Square on Edinburgh's High Street.

The council general was to be a larger body than the court of directors, comprising both the directors themselves and representatives of the remaining subscribers, with one representative for each £10,000 of stock. Whilst the court of directors was responsible for the day-to-day running of the company, the council general was convened to discuss major decisions, such as capital-raising, the election of future directors and the payment of dividends. The council general was only convened as and when there were matters to discuss, and therefore meetings were not held at regular intervals.

== Consequences of failure ==
All told, the venture, dubbed the Darien Scheme, drained Scotland of an estimated quarter of its liquid assets and played a key role in leading the country to the Act of Union 1707 which united the kingdoms of Scotland and England. By 1707, the company's debt was over £14,000 (equivalent to £2,906,720 in 2025).

The new joint government, in a political bargain, agreed to cover the costs of winding up the Company of Scotland, in addition to compensate for servicing the English national debt and higher taxes for Scotland.

== Ships ==
- Rising Sun
- Saint Andrew (1697) (a 56-gun, 350 ton East Indiaman built in Lübeck)
- Caledonia (1697) (a 56-gun, 350 ton East Indiaman built in Lübeck)
- Dolphin (originally a French snow, Royal Louis, bought by James Gibson in Amsterdam)
- Endeavour (a pink bought by Dr. John Munro in Newcastle upon Tyne)
- Unicorn (a 46-gun merchant vessel, originally named Saint Francis, bought by James Gibson in Amsterdam)

== Original signators and major shareholders, May 1695 ==
Note:

- James Balfour of Edinburgh (later styled "of Pilrig")
- Robert Blackwood of Pitreavie
- Sir Robert Chiesley of Bonnington, Lord Provost of Edinburgh
- James Chiesley, brother of the above, Scottish merchant in London
- George Clerk, bailie of Edinburgh
- Adam Cockburn, Lord Ormiston
- John Corse, sugar merchant in Glasgow, brother of Robert Corse
- Thomas Coutts, Scottish merchant in London
- Joseph Cowan, Scottish merchant in London
- Thomas Deans
- James Foulis of Colinton
- Hugh Fraser, Scottish merchant in London
- John Hamilton, Lord Belhaven
- Sir John Maxwell of Nether Pollok
- Francis Montgomerie of Giffen
- David Nairn
- David Ovedo of London
- William Paterson, Scottish banker in London
- Walter Stewart, Scottish merchant in London
- John Swinton of Swinton

All were Scots by birth except John Smith, who was Lord of the Treasury for the English parliament.

== Court of Directors, May 1696 ==
- William Arbuckle - Glasgow merchant
- George Baillie of Jerviswood - Commissioner for Berwickshire
- James Balfour - Edinburgh merchant
- John Hamilton, 2nd Lord Belhaven and Stenton
- Robert Blackwood - Edinburgh merchant
- James Campbell - London merchant
- George Clark - Edinburgh merchant
- Adam Cockburn, Lord Ormiston - Lord Justice Clerk
- John Corse - Glasgow merchant
- Hew Dalrymple - Commissioner for New Galloway
- James Drummond of Newton
- Lieutenant Colonel John Erskine
- John Haldane of Gleneagles
- William Hay of Drumelzier
- Sir John Home of Blackadder - Commissioner for Berwickshire
- Daniel Lodge - London merchant
- James McLurg of Vogrie - Edinburgh merchant
- Sir John Maxwell of Pollock, 1st Baronet - Commissioner for Renfrewshire
- Francis Montgomerie of Giffen - Commissioner for Ayrshire
- Hugh Montgomery - Glasgow merchant
- Sir Archibald Muir of Thornton - Commissioner for Cupar
- William Paterson - London banker
- James Pringle of Torwoodlee - Commissioner for Selkirkshire
- David Ruthven, 2nd Lord Ruthven of Freeland
- Sir Francis Scott of Thirlestane - Commissioner for Selkirkshire (father of William Scott of Thirlestane)
- Sir Patrick Scott of Ancrum
- Sir John Shaw, 2nd Baronet of Greenock
- James Smyth - London merchant
- Sir John Swinton of that Ilk - Commissioner for Berwickshire
- Robert Watson - Edinburgh merchant
- William Wooddrop - Glasgow merchant

== See also ==
- List of trading companies

== Sources ==
- Refer: Papers Relating to the Ships and Voyages of the Company of Scotland Trading to Africa and the Indies, 1696-1707 edited by George Pratt Insh, M.A., Scottish History Society, Edinburgh University Press, 1924.
