= Robert Blackwood of Pitreavie =

Scottish silk merchant (1624–1720)

Robert Blackwood of Pitreavie (1624–1720) was a 17th century Scottish silk merchant who served as Lord Provost of Edinburgh from 1711 to 1713.

== Life ==
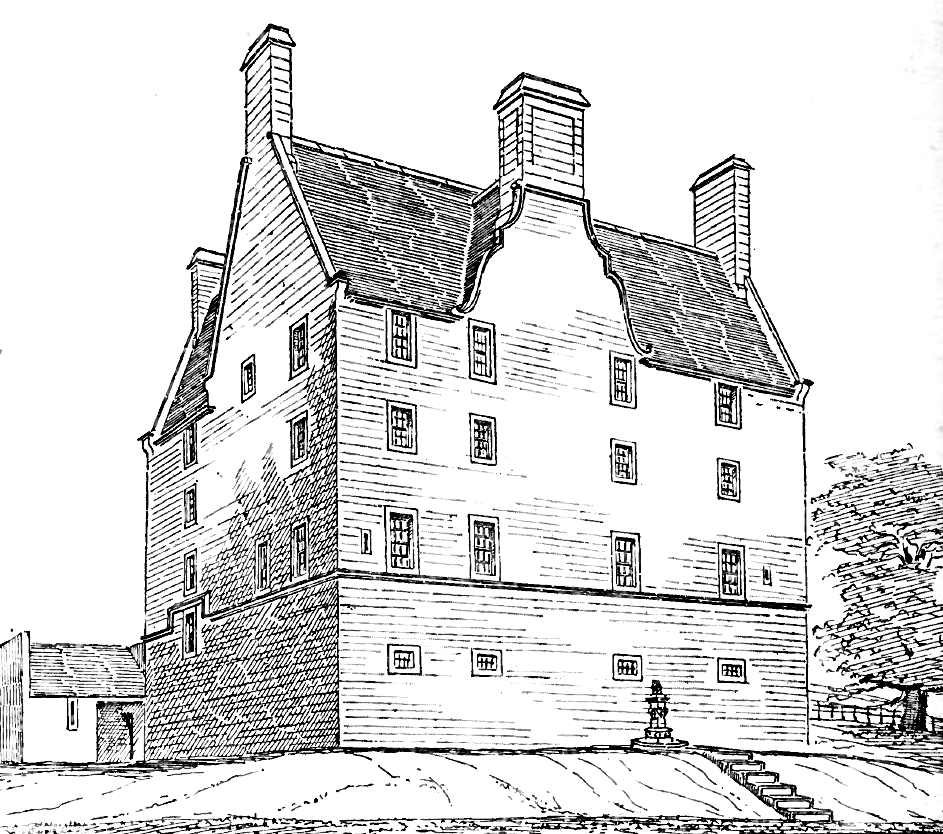
South front of Pitreavie Castle, drawn in the 19th century by MacGibbon and Ross, prior to the alterations of the 1880s

He was born in 1642 the son of George Blackwood (d.1666). He was descended from Adam Blackwood through Rev William Blackwood of Duddingston in 1584.

In 1681 Blackwood was one of the promoters of the New Mills cloth manufactury in Haddingtonshire which was established with a working capital of £5,000.

in 1695 he was one of the 30 men who set up the "Company of Scotland Trading in Africa and the Indies", generally just called the Company of Scotland. He was a member of the committee which recommended proceeding with William Paterson's scheme to establish a Scottish trading colony at Darien on the isthmus of Panama in the autumn of 1697. The Darien Scheme was a disastrous failure, with many of the colonists perishing and investors losing a fortune in the venture in 1698/99.

Blackwood was Lord Dean of Guild in Edinburgh from around 1700. He was awarded a coat of arms by the Lord Lyon in 1704.

Although, unlike his fellow directors of the Company of Scotland, Patrick Johnston and others, Blackwood was not a signatory to the Act of Union 1707 the terms of the Act included the more than dubious agreement to reimburse all losses from the Darien Scheme. Blackwood would have received this enormous compensation in 1707, under the terms of the Act.

In 1711 he purchased Pitreavie Castle from Archibald Primrose, 1st Earl of Rosebery. In the same year he became Lord Provost of Edinburgh. He was succeeded in 1713 by George Warrender of Lochend.

Blackwood died in 1720 but the castle remained in his family line until the end of the 19th century.

== Family ==
Around 1695 he married Ann Steuart, possibly his second wife and presumably many years his junior as she lived until 1783.

His heir was his eldest son Robert Blackwood (d.1767).
