= Robert Corse =

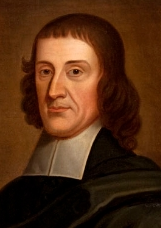
Robert Corse of Corse (1639-1705)

Robert Corse (or Cross) of Corse (1639–1705) was a 17th-century Scottish merchant who traded sugar and tobacco in Glasgow and was a Baillie and Dean of Guild of the City Council. He lost a fortune due to his involvement in the Company of Scotland.

== Life ==
He was born in 1639 one of seven children of John Corse (b.1601) and his wife, Margaret Jack.

Robert built (and lived in) in the original (17th century) Auchintoshan House.

Corse was Dean of Guild in Glasgow City Council. As a businessman he was partners with the Luke family: owning the Easter Sugar House, and at that time, this would normally also mean owning sugar plantations and slaves in Jamaica. He also traded in tobacco, indicating tobacco plantations in the West Indies and/or Virginia.

In June 1681 he is paid £280 (which was then a very large sum) by George Johnstoune to cover the cost of French wine sent to the Duke of Albany. He was elected a Baillie in October 1681. In November 1681 he is ordered to pay Francis Polanus £10 for rescuing two brethren and a sister from slavery by the Turks.

In 1695 he is one of the 30 men setting up the "Company of Scotland Trading in Africa and the Indies" generally known as the Company of Scotland. The 30 men raised £400,000 for a venture now generally called the Darien Scheme, to colonise Panama. The scheme was a failure and the men lost everything. Corse was the only Glaswegian in this mainly Edinburgh-based idea. ['A Biographical Dictionary of Eminent Scotsmen', Vol.IV, page 109, published 1835 by Blackie & Son (Glasgow) lists John Corse as the Glasgow merchant involved in the said 'Company of Scotland']

Robert died a poor man in 1705.

However, his fellow stock-holders, in particular Patrick Johnston, Lord Provost of Edinburgh, brokered a deal with the English, whereby if the Scots gave up their parliament and came under English rule, all stockholders of the Company of Scotland would be fully compensated. This was part of the terms of the Act of Union of 1707.

Corse's sons received his share of the compensation in 1707.

== Family ==
In 1663 he married Joanet Peadie (1640-1700). They had ten children. Janet was sister of James Peadie of Ruchill, later Provost of Glasgow.

His daughter Isobel Cross (1670-1728) married James Luke (1672-1726), the son of his Glasgow business colleague, John Luke of Claythorn. They had a son John Luke (1698-1750).

His son John Cross (1671-1732) was later also Dean of Guild.
