= Haddingtonshire (Parliament of Scotland constituency) =

Constituency of the Parliament of Scotland before 1707

Before the Act of Union 1707, the barons of the constabulary of Haddington (now called East Lothian) elected commissioners to represent them in the unicameral Parliament of Scotland and in the Convention of Estates. The number of commissioners was increased from two to four in 1690.

After 1708, Haddingtonshire returned one member to the House of Commons of Great Britain and later to the House of Commons of the United Kingdom.

== List of commissioners ==
- 1593 parliament and convention: — Hepburn, laird of Waughton
- 1594 parliament and convention: — Hepburn, laird of Waughton
- 1598 convention: — Hepburn, laird of Waughton
- 1599 convention: — Hepburn, laird of Waughton
- 1605: Sir Archibald Douglas of Whittingehame
- 1605: William Douglas of Whittingehame
- 1605 parliament and convention: — Hepburn, laird of Waughton
- 1607: Sir Archibald Douglas of Whittingehame
- 1608: Sir Archibald Douglas of Whittingehame
- 1609 convention: — Hepburn, laird of Waughton
- 1612: Sir James Douglas of Spott
- 1612: Sir Alexander Hamilton of Innerwick
- 1617 parliament and convention: Sir John Home of North Berwick
- 1617 parliament and convention: Sir William Seton
- 1621: Sir Robert Hepburn
- 1622: John Hamilton of Preston
- 1625 convention: Archibald Acheson of Gosford
- 1625 convention: Sir John Seton
- 1628–1633: John Hamilton of Preston
- 1628–1633: Sir Patrick Murray of Elibank
- 1630 convention: Sir Robert Richardson of Pencaitland
- 1639–1641: Sir John Hamilton of Preston
- 1639–1641: Sir Patrick Hepburn of Waughton
- 1640–1641: Sir Patrick Murray of Elibank
- 1643–1644 convention: Sir Adam Hepburn of Humbie
- 1643–1644 convention: Sir Patrick Hepburn of Waughton
- 1644–1645: Sir John St Clair of Hermistoun
- 1644–1647: — Cockburn, laird of Clerkington (possibly son of Sir Richard Cockburn of Clerkington)
- 1644–1647: Sir William Scott of Clerkingtoun
- 1645–1647: Sir John Hamilton of Biel
- 1648: Sir Adam Hepburn of Humbie
- 1648: Sir William Scott of Clerkingtoun
- 1648–1649: John Cockburn of Ormiston
- 1649–1651: Robert Hepburn of Keith
- 1650: John Hepburn of Waughton
- 1650: Sir Alexander Hope of Grantoun
- 1650–1651: Sir Adam Hepburn of Humbie
- 1661–1663: Sir Thomas Hamilton of Preston
- 1661–1663: Sir Peter Wedderburn of Gosford
- 1665 convention: Sir Thomas Hamilton of Preston
- 1665 convention: Sir Peter Wedderburn of Gosford
- 1667 convention: Sir Thomas Hamilton of Preston
- 1667 convention: Sir Peter Wedderburn of Gosford
- 1669–1674: Sir James Hay of Linplum
- 1669–1674: Sir Peter Wedderburn of Gosford
- 1669–1674: John Hay, sheriff-depute
- 1678 convention: Adam Cockburn of Ormiston
- 1678 convention: James Fletcher of Salton
- 1681–1682: Adam Cockburn of Ormiston
- 1681–1682: Andrew Fletcher of Saltoun
- 1685–1686: Sir John Lauder of Fountainhall
- 1685–1686: John Wedderburn of Gosford
- 1689 convention: Adam Cockburn of Ormiston
- 1689 convention: Sir Robert Sinclair of Stevenston
- 1689–1692: Adam Cockburn of Ormiston (vacated on appointment as Lord Justice Clerk, 28 November 1692)
- 1689–1702: Sir Robert Sinclair of Stevenston
- 1690–1702: Sir John Lauder of Fountainhall
- 1690–1702: William Morison of Prestongrange
- 1693–1702: William Hepburn of Beinstoun
- 1702–1707: Andrew Fletcher of Saltoun
- 1702–1707: John Cockburn, younger of Ormiston
- 1702–1707: Sir John Lauder of Fountainhall
- 1702–1707: William Nisbet of Dirleton

In February 1707, Cockburn and Nisbet were elected by the other shire commissioners to serve among the Scottish representatives to the first Parliament of Great Britain.
