= Ardizzone =

Ardizzone is an Italian surname. Notable people with the surname include:

- Edward Ardizzone (1900–1979), English artist, illustrator, and writer
- Francesco Ardizzone (born 1992), Italian soccer player
- Joseph Ardizzone (1884–1931), Italian–born American mobster
- Simon Ardizzone, American documentarian and producer
- Tony Ardizzone (born 1949), American writer
- Tony Ardizzone (American football) (born 1956), American football player
