= Myrton baronets =

Extinct baronetcy in the Baronetage of Nova Scotia

The Myrton Baronetcy, of Gogar in the County of Edinburgh, was a title in the Baronetage of Nova Scotia. It was created on 28 June 1701 for Andrew Myrton. The title became extinct on the death of the second Baronet in 1774.

== Myrton baronets, of Gogar (1701) ==
- Sir Andrew Myrton, 1st Baronet (died 1720)
- Sir Robert Myrton, 2nd Baronet (died 1774)
