= Patrick Hepburn of Waughton =

Scottish laird and Covenanter

Sir Patrick Hepburn of Waughton and Luffness (d. Bef. November 1649) was a Scottish laird and notable Covenanter from East Lothian. In 1639-1641, Sir Patrick was a shire commissioner for Haddingtonshire in the Scottish Parliament.

== Landed proprietor ==
His father, also Patrick Hepburn, had supported the Scottish Reformation in 1559. In 1567, he helped hold Dunbar Castle for his kinsman James Hepburn, 4th Earl of Bothwell, and was ordered to surrender Waughton Castle to Regent Moray. Patrick Hepburn of Waughton and Lufness was retoured heir to his father on 3 April 1605.

Hepburn sold the lands of Brethertoun [Brotherton] to George Keith, 5th Earl Marischal, and his wife Margaret Ogilvie for £20,500 Scots on 8 December 1613.

On 10 January 1639, George Lauder of The Bass, and his mother (Hepburn's sister) Isobel Hepburn, Lady Bass, being both Royalists and having spent much time at Court with Charles I and fearing forfeiture, assigned the barony of The Bass and a string of other properties to Hepburn. In a Supplication dated 15 September 1641, by Sir Patrick Hepburn of Wauchtoun addressed to the King and the Estates of Parliament, he mentions that he has lately acquired the right of the lands of Popill and Auld Haddington from the Laird of The Bass. On 15 November 1641 Hepburn was confirmed in several properties including lands in Morham and Garvald previously owned by Lauder.

Between 1644 until his death, Hepburn was engaged in a dispute with the Earl of Home over possession of Fast Castle, and the rents of Auldcambus.

== Covenant ==
Sir Patrick was a Lieutenant-Colonel who raised a 400 strong infantry regiment in East Lothian, which served in General Leslie's army of the Covenant, entering England on 20 August 1640. Sir Patrick was one of the commissioners to the negotiations at Ripon in Yorkshire. The regiment served at the sieges of York and Newcastle-upon-Tyne and at the battle of Marston Moor. "Wauchtoun's regiment" with Sir Patrick Hepburn as commander is recorded as being quartered and then in skirmishes with the Royalists at Todcaster and York in April 1644.

From late 1644 until January 1647 it remained in England doing garrison duty, its strength being between 631 and 651 infantrymen. In 1646 Sir Adam Hepburn of Humbie, the army treasurer and commissary general, became the colonel, and the numbers increased to 893 and reached a maximum of 1030 foot soldiers in September. The regiment disbanded in February 1647.

== Marriage and death ==
Sir Patrick married after 16 February 1607 (when a charter mentions them as future spouses) Jean, fifth and youngest daughter of John Murray, 1st Earl of Tullibardine

Sir Patrick was, according to a charter dated 24 June 1646, still alive then, but is thought to have died before 9 November 1649, when his son John was retoured his heir. That was followed on the same day by a Precept from Chancery for infefting John Hepburne, now of Wauchtoun, as heir to his father, Sir Patrick Hepburne of Wauchtoun in the lands and baronies of Wauchtoun and The Bass, and other lands in the sheriffdoms of Edinburgh and Berwick.

Of at least seven children, the following are noted:

- John Hepburn of Waughton (d. Bef. 27 August 1669), an Episcopalian Minister deposed by the Presbyterians who held The Bass against Oliver Cromwell, surrendering to Major-General Deane in 1652.
- George Hepburn of Fast Castle, and Cranshaws, Berwickshire, (alive July 1655).
- Anne, married by contract in 1623, Sir James Hamilton of Priestfield, Commendator of the Priory of Haddington. He was Gentleman of The Bedchamber to King Charles the First in 1638.
