= Alexander Gordon (pioneer) =

Alexander Gordon (1635 in Aberdeen Scotland – 1697), fought as a Royalist and was captured by Oliver Cromwell's army at the Battle of Worcester on 3 September 1651 at the end of the English Civil War. He was imprisoned at Tothill Field outside London over the winter of 1651–1652. He was transported to the New World in 1652 and entered into indentured servitude. His later victory over servitude became the legal precedent in Massachusetts.

Along with many other Scottish prisoners, he sailed on the ship "Liberty", commanded by Capt. James Allen to Boston, and was confined at Watertown as a prisoner of war. For a year or more Alexander remained with John Cloyes, a boatswain, or mate, of the vessel living in Cambridge on the road to Watertown—near the site of Cambridge Hospital today. While there he formed an acquaintance with Samuel Stratton of Watertown, with whom he made a six-year contract on 25 April 1653, as an apprentice, to learn the art of husbandry. This contract should have ended in 1659, but after a year's work without pay, Cloyes sold Alexander's indenture to Samuel Stratton in Watertown as a "husbandry apprentice."

On 3 November 1663, through the kindness of a resident of Cambridge, Alexander appealed again to the court in Massachusetts and was released from his contract. His six-year contract with Samuel Stratton ended on paper in 1659. But Alexander was forced to continue working until November 1663 when he won his freedom in a landmark court case in Massachusetts. Alexander made his way to New Hampshire, where in the company of other Scots ex-prisoners, he helped found the town of Exeter. He found employment at the sawmill of Nicholas Lisson. At 28, Alexander Gordon married the owner's daughter, Mary Lisson (19) and became the forefather of the extensive Gordon family in New England.

Alexander Gordon died in 1697. Notable individuals descending from him include U.S. Representative for New Hampshire William Gordon, Rhode Island State Representative Daniel P. Gordon Jr., and founder of Gordon College (Massachusetts), Adoniram Judson Gordon.
