= John Maxwell, Lord Pollok =

Scottish politician and lawyer

Sir John Maxwell of Nether Pollok (1648–1732), also known by his judicial title Lord Pollok was a Scottish politician and lawyer.

The son of Sir George Maxwell of Auldhouse and Pollok and Annabella Stewart, he trained as a lawyer and became a Privy Counsellor. He was made a baronet in 1682, of Pollok in the County of Renfrew (now Pollokshaws in Glasgow) and was Rector of the University of Glasgow from 1691 to 1718.

He was an investor in the Company of Scotland trading to Africa and the Indies and, on 3rd April 1696, he was elected to the court of directors of the company.

He was a Treasury Lord Commissioner in 1696 and 1698 and a Shire Commissioner for Renfrewshire in the Parliament of Scotland for 1689–93, 1695–96 and 1698–99.

He served as Lord Justice Clerk from 1699 to 1702 and succeeded Lord Newbyth as a Senator of the College of Justice from 1699 to his death.

He died at Nether Pollok in 1732. He had married Marian Stewart, daughter of Sir James Stewart of Coltness and Kirkfield. They had no children and he was succeeded in the baronetcy by his nephew John Maxwell of Blawerthill.

Academic offices
Preceded by David Boyle	Rector of the University of Glasgow	Succeeded by Mungo Graham of Gorthie
Legal offices
Preceded by Adam Cockburn, Lord Ormiston	Lord Justice Clerk; 1699–1702	Succeeded by Roderick Mackenzie, Lord Prestonhall
Baronetage of Nova Scotia
New creation	Baronet of Nether Park; 1682/1707 – 1732	Succeeded by John Maxwell
