= Ormiston =

Village in East Lothian, Scotland

Coordinates: 55.912°N 2.943°W

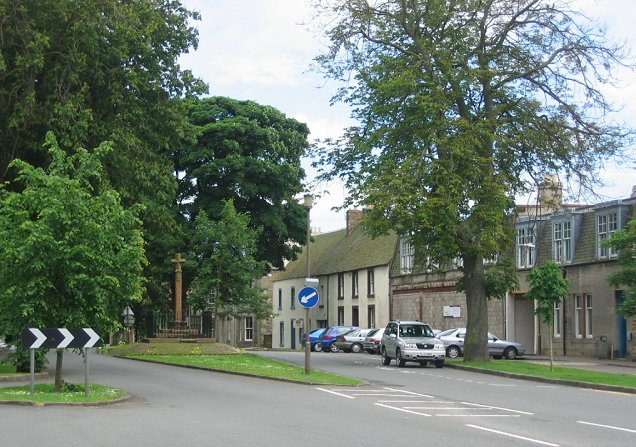
- Mercat Cross in Main Street, Ormiston

- Location within East Lothian
- Population: 2,110 (2020)
- OS grid reference: NT410691
- Council area: East Lothian
- Lieutenancy area: East Lothian
- Country: Scotland
- Sovereign state: United Kingdom
- Post town: TRANENT
- Postcode district: EH35
- Dialling code: 01875
- Police: Scotland
- Fire: Scottish
- Ambulance: Scottish
- UK Parliament: East Lothian
- Scottish Parliament: East Lothian

Ormiston is a village in East Lothian, Scotland, near Tranent, Humbie, Pencaitland and Cranston, located on the north bank of the River Tyne at an elevation of about 276 feet (84 m).

The village was the first planned village in Scotland, founded in 1735 by John Cockburn (1685–1758), one of the initiators of the Agricultural Revolution.

== Name ==
The word Ormiston is derived from a half mythical Norwegian Viking settler called Ormr, meaning 'serpent' or 'snake'. 'Ormres' family had possession of the land during the 12th and 13th centuries. Ormiston or 'Ormistoun' is not an uncommon surname, and Ormr also survives in some English placenames such as Ormskirk and Ormesby. The latter part of the name, formerly spelt 'toun', is likely to descend from its Northumbrian Old English and later Scots meaning as 'farmstead' or 'farm and outbuildings' rather than the meaning 'town'.

There was an "Ormiston" in Berwickshire, near Linton, where the legend of the Worm of Linton was related to land ownership by Lord Somerville and Lord Lindsay. The Cockburn family may have brought the name from the Berwickshire "Ormiston" to the East Lothian location in the 14th-century.

== History ==
Ormiston was the home of the poet Elizabeth Douglas (died 1594), wife of Samuel Cockburn of Templehall, who with Mary Beaton contributed sonnets to a work by the poet William Fowler in 1587. Fowler wrote an epitaph for her. James VI came to Ormiston to hunt deer on 22 November 1588, and returned to Biel and Ormiston to hunt in October 1599.

The "model village" was laid out in 1736 by the new laird John Cockburn who had inherited the estate from his uncle, who had died without a male heir.

William Begg, Robert Burns's nephew became the parish schoolmaster at Ormiston. The whole Begg family moved to live with him at Ormiston's schoolhouse. Isabella Begg née Burns also ran a school here. The family later moved to nearby Tranent in 1834 when William resigned his post and emigrated to America.

== Description ==
The village consists mainly of a broad Main Street, with a row of mostly two storey houses along each side. It crosses two bridges, one over the now redundant railway route, and the other a narrow bridge over the river Tyne. Using strict guidelines for its appearance, John Cockburn put housing for artisans and cottage industries (spinning and weaving) around the original mill hamlet. When he did not achieve the expected return on his investment, he sold it to the Earl of Hopetoun in 1747. The linen trade became a failure, and by 1811 the distillery shut down. A brewery and one of Scotland's first bleachfields were also built here as well. Ormiston later became a mining village. The Ormiston Coal Company's workings were south of Tranent in East Lothian. The company was one of a number of small concerns working either a single or a few linked, small pits on the East Lothian coalfield.

=== Ormiston Coal Co. Ltd. ===
The principal collieries at Ormiston were:

- Limeylands (NT406695, 1 km (0.62 mi) west of the Mercat Cross), opened 1895, closed 1954, though the coal preparation plant stayed in use until about October 1958.
- Tynemount (NT401686, 1.5 km (0.93 mi) west-south-west of the Mercat Cross), opened 1924, closed January 1952, but not formally abandoned until 1962.
- Oxenford No. 2 (NT393678, south-west of Tynemount), opened 1926, closed 1950.
- Oxenford No. 3 (NT393677), a new pit very close by, was opened by the National Coal Board, but closed in 1952.
- Winton Mine (NT421699), first provided for ventilation purposes in 1943, but developed as a mine by the National Coal Board in 1952, closed in 1962.

=== Ormiston Hall ===
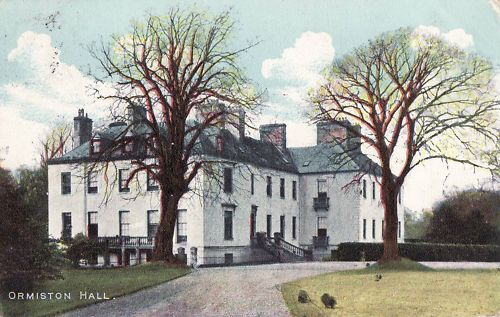
Ormiston Hall, prior to the fire which left it in ruins

Ormiston Hall lay to the south of the village. It was built for John Cockburn in 1745–48 and was later extended for the Earl of Hopetoun. It was added to on at least three occasions in the next 100 years. The Hall now lies in ruins following a fire during World War II with residential properties built in and around the grounds.

The remains of the pre-Reformation St Giles Parish Church can still be seen nearby. The Great Yew of Ormiston grows to the south of the hall site. It is a rare example of a layering yew-tree and, according to the Forestry Commission, is up to one thousand years old.

=== Shops in Ormiston ===
There are a number of shops in Ormiston. On the Main Street:

- The Co-operative Store
- Post Office Ltd – At the end of 2011, the Post Office changed ownership and the new profile is as a grocery shop with a Post Office counter.

Elsewhere in the village:

- The Little Superstore

There are a number of small businesses operating from units in the Cockburn Halls, formerly the Miners' Welfare building.

=== Mercat Cross ===
The 15th-century pre-Reformation Mercat Cross on Main Street is unusual for its truly cruciform shape, with three modern steps and a railed enclosure. It is in the care of Historic Scotland.

== Notable people ==
- Birthplace of the Scottish Congregationalist missionary Robert Moffat (1795–1883); a memorial is erected in his name. He was the father-in-law of David Livingstone, the medical missionary and explorer. His father was a custom house officer; the family of his mother, Ann Gardiner, had lived for several generations at Ormiston.
- The religious reformer and Protestant martyr George Wishart was captured in December 1545 by the Earl of Bothwell while hiding at Ormiston Hall.
- John Cockburn of Ormiston, Protestant laird, (died 1583) and his brother, Ninian Cockburn, (died 1579), political agent.
- John Cockburn of Ormiston (c. 1685–1758), landowner and agricultural reformer.
- Charles Maclaren, journalist and geologist, co-founded The Scotsman newspaper, and edited the 6th Edition of the Encyclopædia Britannica
- Col. James Burd, hero of the French and Indian War and local Pennsylvania leader in the leadup to the American Revolution

== Photo gallery ==
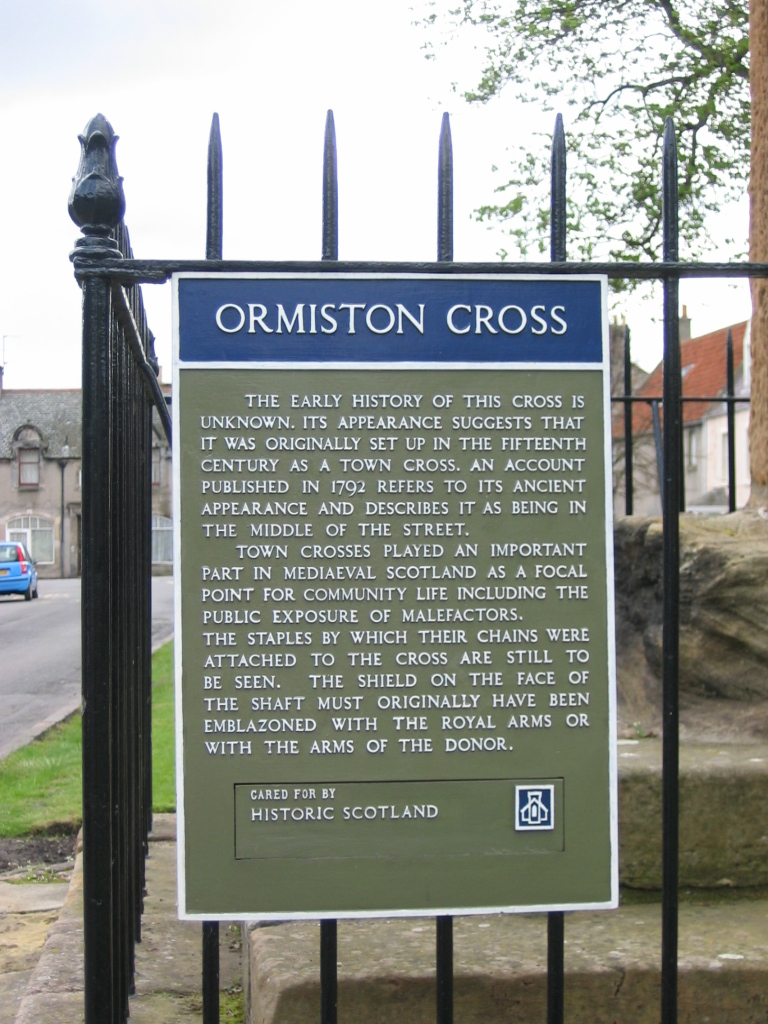
Ormiston Mercat Cross, Historic Scotland plaque

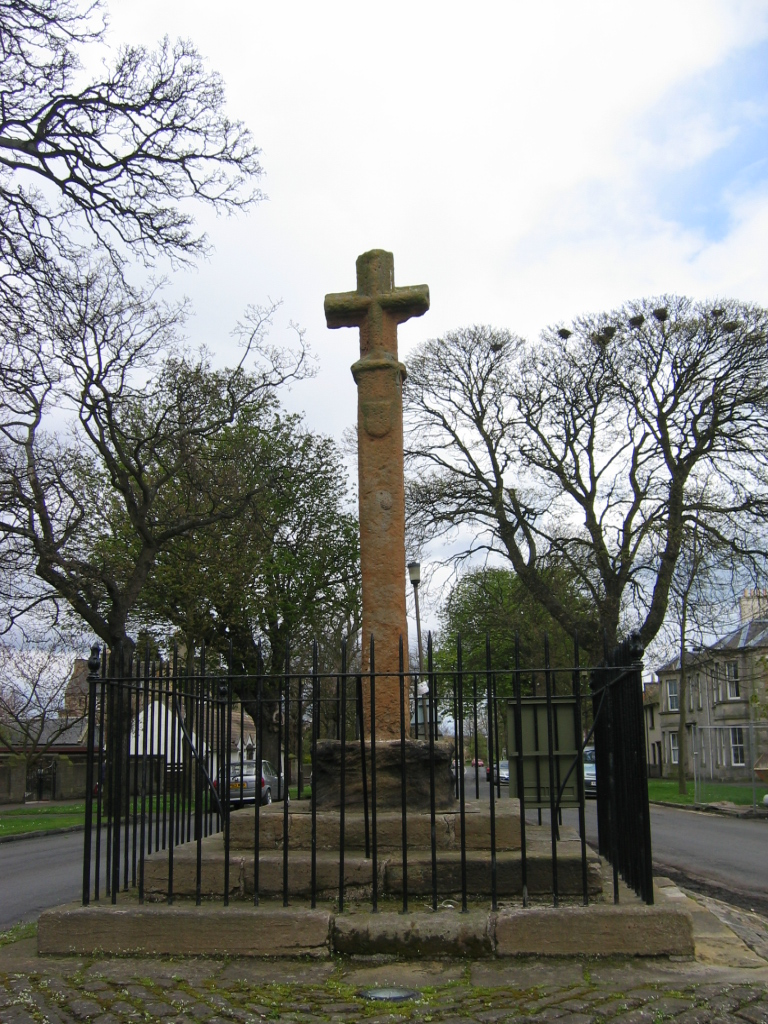
Ormiston Mercat Cross

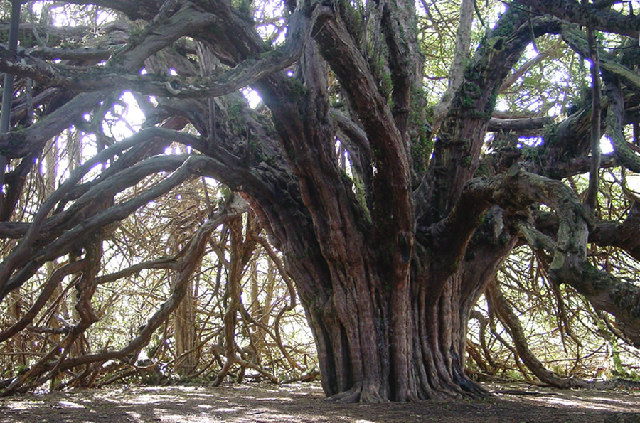
Ormiston Yew, outside the town, one of Scotland's few ancient layering yews

== See also ==
- List of places in East Lothian
