= 1635 in Scotland =

- Centuries: 15th; 16th; 17th; 18th; 19th
- Decades: 1610s; 1620s; 1630s; 1640s; 1650s
- See also: List of years in Scotland; Timeline of Scottish history 1635 in: England • Elsewhere

Events from the year 1635 in the Kingdom of Scotland.

== Incumbents ==
=== Monarch ===
- Monarch – Charles I

=== Judiciary ===
- Lord President of the Court of Session – Robert Spottiswood
- Lord Justice General – William Elphinstone
- Lord Justice Clerk – James Carmichael of the Ilk

== Events ==
- May – Without consulting the Parliament of Scotland, Charles I authorized a new Book of Canons, which among others made him the head of the Church of Scotland.

=== Full dates unknown ===
- Construction of Malleny House and Garden was initiated.
- Earliest recorded establishment of a lighthouse in Isle of May.
- Publication of the 1635 edition of Scottish Psalter.

== Births ==
- 10 April – Patrick Gordon, Scottish general (died 1699)
- 5 August – George Martine, Scottish historian (died 1712)
- 28 December – Elizabeth Stuart, daughter of Charles I (died 1650)

=== Full dates unknown ===
- Kenneth Mackenzie, Scottish noble (died 1678)
- George Douglas, Scottish general (died 1692)
- Michael Bruce, Scottish clergy (died 1693)
- Alexander Gordon, Scottish royalist who emigrated to North America (died 1697)
- Katherine Ross, Scottish educator (died 1697)
- Archibald Riddell, Scottish clergy (died 1708)
- George Hamilton, Scottish clergy (died 1712)
- James Stewart, Scottish politician (died 1713)
- George Haliburton, Scottish clergy (died 1715)
- Walter Gibson, Scottish merchant and politician (died 1723)

== Deaths ==
- 1 January – Patrick Anderson, Scottish physician (born 1618)
- 28 March – Patrick Forbes, Scottish bishop (born 1564)
- 17 July – Robert Echlin, Scottish clergy (born 1576)
- 28 October – William Keith, Scottish noble and general (born 1585)

=== Full dates unknown ===
- William Seton of Kylesmure, Scottish politician (born 1562)
- Walter Stewart, Scottish clergy (born 1568)
- John Auchmoutie, Scottish politician (born 1580)

== See also ==
- Timeline of Scottish history
- 1679 in England
