= Roderick Mackenzie, Lord Prestonhall =

Scottish judge and Senator of the College of Justice

Roderick Mackenzie, Lord Prestonhall (c.1635–1712) was a Scottish judge and Senator of the College of Justice.

== Life ==
He was the son of Sir John Mackenzie of Tarbat (1608-1654) and his wife Margaret Erskine. His older brother was George Mackenzie, 1st Earl of Cromartie.

In 1700 he built Preston Hall south of Edinburgh near Dalkeith.

On 12 January he was created a Senator of the College of Justice taking the title Lord Prestonhall, in place of the late James Scougal, Lord Whitehill.

His resigned his position as Senator in June 1710 and the position was filled by his nephew James Mackenzie, Lord Royston.

He died on 4 December 1712.

Preston Hall was bought in 1738 by Henrietta widow of the Duke of Gordon who commissioned William Adam to remodel it, and it was again remodelled 1792-1800 when it was redesigned as a highly formal mansion with side wings, as it now exists.

== Family ==
He married twice: firstly in 1674 to Mary Burnet; secondly to Margaret Halyburton of Pitcur, granddaughter of Sir James Halyburton.
