= Adam Cockburn, Lord Ormiston =

Scottish administrator, politician and judge

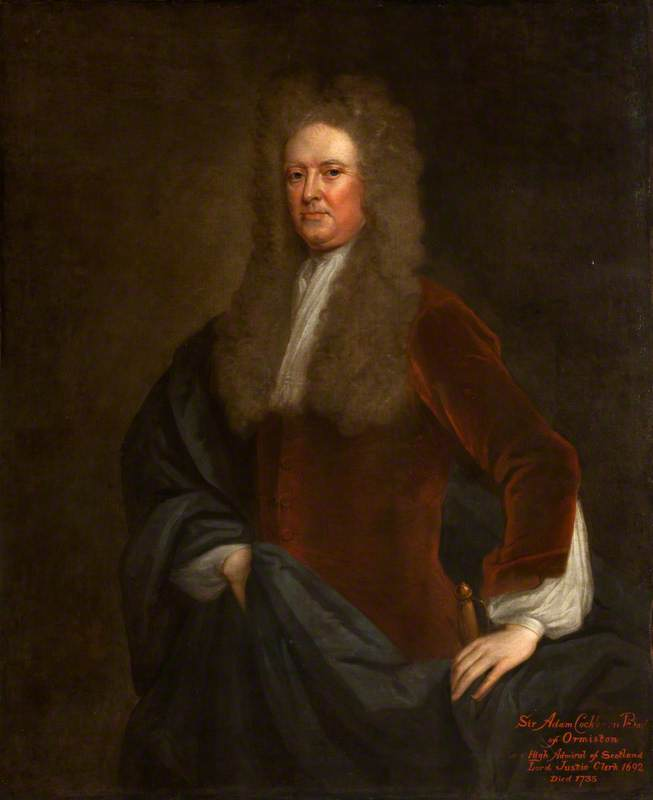
Portrait by William Aikman

Adam Cockburn, Laird of Ormiston, Lord Ormiston (1656 – 16 April 1735), was a Scottish administrator, politician and judge. He served as shire commissioner for Haddingtonshire in the parliaments of 1681-2 and 1689, and in the conventions of 1678 and 1689. He was appointed Lord Justice Clerk on 28 November 1692.

Cockburn served as a member of the Privy Council, Treasurer Depute from 1699 until the accession of Anne, Lord Justice Clerk for a second term (1705–10), and a Lord of Session from 1705.

== Career ==
He was Commissioner for Haddingtonshire at the Conventions of Estates in the years 1678, 1681, and 1689, and in Parliament of Scotland for the year 1690. He was nominated one of the Commissioners to treat on the Union of Parliaments, on 19 April 1689.

Adam Cockburn was appointed Lord Justice Clerk in place of Sir George Campbell of Cessnock on 28 November 1692 and at about the same time was sworn a Privy Councillor.

He was one of the Commissioners named to inquire into the Massacre of Glencoe on 28 May 1695, and became somewhat unpopular in some quarters because of the powers awarded to his position in order for him to reach conclusions in the matter. On 6 February 1699 he succeeded Lord Raith as Treasurer-depute of Scotland, which he retained until the accession of Queen Anne, when he was dismissed from all his offices.

In 1695 he is one of the 30 or so wealthy merchants and officials setting up the "Company of Scotland Trading to Africa and the Indies" generally known simply as the Company of Scotland and being the instigator of the ruinous Darien Scheme. As he is also a signatory to the Act of Union 1707 he is one of the small group who were fully compensated for his losses in the Darien Scheme if agreeing to a Union with England. As such (i.e. being named on each list) he was one of the Parcel of Rogues referred to by Robert Burns.

Seen as an enlightened landlord, in 1698 he granted an 11-year lease to a Robert Wight, who was the first tenant farmer in Scotland to enclose his fields with a ditch and hedge, also planting trees with the hedgerow to act as a windbreak. Cockburn also enclosed his own estates at Ormiston.

He obtained a commission appointing him a second time Lord Justice Clerk dated 8 January 1705 and was at the same time appointed to succeed Lord Whitelaw as a Lord Ordinary in the Court of Session. As Lord Justice Clerk, he received payment of £200 a year. In May 1714, he was one of the elders appointed by the General Assembly of the Church of Scotland to sit on a committee investigating disputes within the church. He left the office of Lord Justice Clerk again in 1710 but retained his place as a Lord Ordinary until his death, on 16 April 1735, in his 79th year.

== Family ==
Adam Cockburn was the son of John Cockburn of Ormiston, and Janet Hepburn, daughter of Sir Adam Hepburn of Humbie. He was retoured heir to his brother John in the family's ancient estate of Ormiston, East Lothian, on 28 December 1671.

He married twice:

1. Susanna (born 20 July 1657, Tyninghame), daughter of John Hamilton, 4th Earl of Haddington. They had several children, including the MP John Cockburn of Ormiston; Anne, who married Sir John Inglis of Cramond; Charles, who married Margaret, daughter of John Haldane, laird of Gleneagles; and Christiane, who married Sir Robert Sinclair of Longformacus.
2. Anne (died 1721), the twice-widowed daughter of Sir Patrick Houstoun, 1st Baronet, and mother of his son-in-law, Sir John Inglis of Cramond. They had a daughter, Jean (1709 - 1792 Kelso, Scotland) who married William Walker.

== Sources ==
- An Historical Account of the Senators of the College of Justice of Scotland, by Sir David Dalrymple of Hailes, Bt., with some further editing and additions, Edinburgh, 1849.
- The House of Cockburn of that Ilk and Cadets Thereof, by Thomas H.Cockburn-Hood (Edinburgh, 1888) page 154.
- Index to Genealogies, Birthbriefs, and Funeral Escutcheons, recorded in the Lyon Court, by Francis J. Grant, W.S., Lyon Clerk and Keeper of the Records, Edinburgh, 1908, p. 11.
