= Secretary of State (Kingdom of Scotland) =

Position in the Kingdom of Scotland (14th-18th centuries)

The secretary of Scotland or lord secretary was a senior post in the government of the Kingdom of Scotland.

The office appeared in the 14th century (or earlier) when it was combined with that of Keeper of the Privy Seal. Called Clericus Regis (although some have applied that to the lord clerk register), he was regarded as an Officer of State. The secretary was constantly to attend the king's person, receive the petitions and memorials that were presented to him, and write the king's answers upon them. All letters patent passed through his hands, and were drawn up by him as with all the king's letters and dispatches, warrants, orders, &c. In the case of lengthy documents a short docket was also subscribed by the secretary for the king's perusal, as a summary; and as all the writings signed by the king came through his hands, he was answerable for them if they contained anything derogatory to the laws or the dignity of the Crown.

From 1626 until their respective deaths, King Charles I divided the duties between two secretaries, the Earl of Stirling and Sir Archibald Achison of Glencairn.

The secretary did not invariably sit in the Parliament of Scotland after 1603, because his duties normally involved his attendance upon the monarch who was thereafter resident in England. Between 1608 and 1640 there were often two secretaries, which became normal practice after 1680, although only one could sit in Parliament.

The office was abolished as such in 1709, though from then until 1725 and again from 1742 to 1746 there was a third secretary of state with particular responsibility for Scottish affairs, for those posts, see Secretary of State for Scotland.

== Secretaries of State ==
Image	Secretary	From	To	Monarch
	Nicholas			Malcolm IV
	Duncan Pecoce	1380		Robert II
	Andrew de Hawick, Rector of Linton	1410		James I
	John Stewart, Earl of Buchan	1418		James I
	John Cameron (later Bishop of Glasgow)	1424		James I
	William Foulis	1429		James I
	John Methven	1432		James I
	John de Ralston, Bishop of Dunkeld	1442	1448	James II
	Nicholas Otterburn	1449	1452	James II
	George Shoreswood, Chancellor of Dunkeld (later Bishop of Brechin)	1453	1454	James II
	Thomas Vaus, Dean of Glasgow	4 December 1456	21 October 1458	James II
	John Arous, Archdeacon of Glasgow	9 November 1458	24 July 1459	James II
	George Ledale, Parson of Forest	18 September 1459	10 February 1462	James II / James III
	Archibald Whitelaw, Archdeacon of Lothian	27 August 1462	1493	James III / James IV
	Richard Muirhead, Dean of Glasgow	4 August 1493	4 March 1506	James IV
	Patrick Panter, Abbot of Cambuskenneth	22 November 1506	18 November 1519	James IV / James V
	Thomas Hay, Parson of Rathven	1 April 1517	1 August 1524	James V
	Patrick Hepburn, Prior of St Andrews	8 March 1525	15 June 1526	James V
	Sir Thomas Erskine of Haltoun	5 October 1526	10 January 1543	James V / Mary, Queen of Scots
	David Panter, Bishop of Ross	20 January 1543	28 February 1543	Mary, Queen of Scots
	Henry Balnaves of Halhill	28 February 1543	4 May 1543	Mary, Queen of Scots
	David Paniter, Bishop of Ross	4 May 1543	1558	Mary, Queen of Scots
	William Maitland of Lethington	1558	16 May 1571	Mary, Queen of Scots / James VI
	Robert Pitcairn, Commendator of Dunfermline Abbey	28 August 1571	1583	James VI
	Sir John Maitland of Thirlestane	1584	1591	James VI
	Sir Richard Cockburn of Clerkington	1591	1596	James VI
	Sir John Lindsay of Balcarres	1596	1598	James VI
	James Elphinstone	1598	1609	James VI
	Sir Alexander Hay of Whitburgh	1608	1612	James VI
	Sir Thomas Hamilton	1612	1626	James VI / Charles I
	William Alexander, 1st Earl of Stirling	1626	1640	Charles I
	Sir Archibald Acheson of Glencairnie	1626	1634	Charles I
	William Hamilton, 2nd Duke of Hamilton	1641	1649	Charles I
	Sir Robert Spottiswood of New Abbey	1644	1644	Charles I
	William Kerr, 1st Earl of Lothian	10 March 1649		Parliament
	John Maitland, 2nd Earl of Lauderdale	19 January 1661	1680 (dismissed)	Charles II
	Charles Middleton, 2nd Earl of Middleton	26 September 1682	1684	Charles II
	Alexander Stewart, 5th Earl of Moray	11 October 1680	1688	Charles II
	John Drummond, 1st Earl of Melfort	15 September 1684	1689	Charles II / James VII / William II and Mary II
	George Melville, 1st Earl of Melville	13 May 1689	1691	William II and Mary II
	John Dalrymple, Master of Stair	1 January 1691	1695	William II and Mary II (later, only William II)
	James Johnston	3 March 1692	1696	William II and Mary II (later, only William II)
	John Murray, Earl of Tullibardine	15 January 1696	31 March 1698	William II
	James Ogilvy, 1st Earl of Seafield	5 February 1696	21 November 1702	William II / Anne
	John Carmichael, 1st Earl of Hyndford	31 January 1699	6 May 1702	William II / Anne
	James Douglas, 2nd Duke of Queensberry	6 May 1702	16 October 1704	Anne
	George Mackenzie, 1st Viscount Tarbat	21 November 1702	17 October 1704	Anne
	John Ker, 5th Earl of Roxburghe	16 October 1704	5 June 1705	Anne
	James Ogilvy, 1st Earl of Seafield	17 October 1704	March 1705	Anne
	William Johnstone, 1st Marquess of Annandale	10 March 1705	September 1705	Anne
	Hugh Campbell, 3rd Earl of Loudoun	5 June 1705	1 May 1707 (and then Secretary of State for Scotland to 25 May 1708)	Anne
	John Erskine, 6th Earl of Mar	19 September 1705	1 May 1707 (and then Secretary of State for Scotland to February 1709)	Anne

For the equivalent position after the 1707 Treaty see Secretary of State for Scotland.
