= Lord Justice Clerk =

2nd most senior judge in Scotland, United Kingdom

- Royal Coat of Arms of Scotland

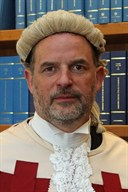
- Incumbent; Lord Beckett since 4 February 2025
- Style: The Right Honourable
- Appointer: Monarch on the advice of the First Minister
- Term length: Life tenure with compulsory retirement at 75
- Salary: £215,256 (Salary Group 2)

The lord justice clerk is the second most senior judge in Scotland, after the lord president of the Court of Session. The current lord justice clerk is Lord Beckett, who was appointed to the position on 4 February 2025, succeeding Lady Dorrian who had been the first female to hold the office.

== History ==
In modern times, most judges appointed as Lord Justice Clerk later become Lord President of the Court of Session.

Originally clericus justiciarie or clerk to the Court of Justiciary, the counterpart in the criminal courts of the lord clerk register, the status of the office increased over time and the Justice-Clerk came to claim a seat on the Bench by practice and custom. This was recognised by the Privy Council of Scotland in 1663 and the lord justice clerk became the effective head of the reformed High Court of Justiciary in 1672 when the court was reconstituted. The lord justice clerk now rarely presides at criminal trials in the High Court, with most of their time being spent dealing with civil and criminal appeals.

The lord justice clerk has the title in both the Court of Session and the High Court of Justiciary and, as President of the Second Division of the Inner House, is in charge of the Second Division of Judges of the Inner House of the Court of Session. The office is one of the Great Officers of State of Scotland.

== Officeholders ==
- William de Camera - Justice-Clerk to David II (1324–71)
- Adam Forester
- Before 1374: Alan de Lawedre of Whitslaid & Haltoun, etc.
- 1426: James de Lawedre (d. after 1459)(Grandson of Alan)
- 1478: William Halket of Belsico
- 1489/90: Richard Lawson of High Riggs.
- 1507: James Henderson of Fordel (k. Battle of Flodden 1513)
- 1513: James Wishhart of Pittarrow
- 1524: Nicholas Crawfurd of Oxengangs
- 1537: Adam Otterburn of Reidhall
- 1537: Thomas Scot of Pitgorn
- 1539: Thomas Bellenden of Auchnoule
- 1540: Henry Balnaves
- 1547: Sir John Bellenden of Auchnole & Broughton (d.1576)
- 1577: Sir Lewis Bellenden of Auchnole & Broughton (d.1591)
- 1591: Sir John Cockburn of Ormiston (d.1623)
- 1625: Sir George Elphinstone of Blythswood
- 1634: Sir James Carmichael of that Ilk
- 1637: Sir John Hamilton of Orbiston
- 1651–63: Sir Robert Moray
- 1663–71: Sir John Home, of Renton, Lord Renton
- 1671–74: Sir James Lockhart of Lee (d. 4 June 1674)
- 1674–75: Sir William Lockhart of Lee
- 1675–80: Sir Thomas Wallace of Craigie, Lord Craigie
- 1680–84: Richard Maitland, 4th Earl of Lauderdale
- 1684–88: Sir James Foulis of Colinton, Lord Colinton
- 1688–90: Sir John Dalrymple, 1st Earl of Stair
- 1690–92: Sir George Campbell of Cessnock
- 1692–99: Sir Adam Cockburn of Ormiston, Lord Ormiston
- 1699–1702: Sir John Maxwell of Pollok, Lord Pollok
- 1702–04: Roderick Mackenzie of Prestonhall, Lord Prestonhall
- 1704–05: Sir William Hamilton of Whitelaw, Lord Whitelaw
- 1705–10: Sir Adam Cockburn of Ormiston, Lord Ormiston
- 1710–14: Sir James Erskine, Lord Grange
- 1714–35: Adam Cockburn of Ormiston, Lord Ormiston
- 1735–48: Andrew Fletcher, Lord Milton
- 1748–63: Charles Erskine, Lord Tinwald
- 1763–66: Gilbert Elliot, Lord Minto
- 1766–87: Thomas Miller, Lord Barskimming
- 1787–99: Robert Macqueen, Lord Braxfield
- 1799–1804: David Rae, Lord Eskgrove
- 1804–11: Charles Hope, Lord Granton
- 1811–41: David Boyle, Lord Boyle
- 1841–58: John Hope, Lord Hope
- 1858–67: John Inglis, Lord Glencorse
- 1867–69: George Patton, Lord Glenalmond
- 1869–88: James Moncreiff, Lord Moncreiff
- 1888–1915: John Macdonald, Lord Kingsburgh
- 1915–22: Charles Dickson, Lord Dickson
- 1922–33: Robert Munro, Lord Alness
- 1933–41: Craigie Aitchison, Lord Aitchison
- 1941–47: Thomas Cooper, Lord Cooper
- 1947: Alexander Moncrieff, Lord Moncrieff
- 1947–62: George Thomson, Lord Thomson
- 1962–72: William Grant, Lord Grant
- 1972: John Wheatley, Baron Wheatley
- 1985: Donald Ross, Lord Ross
- 1997: William Cullen, Lord Cullen
- 2001: Brian Gill, Lord Gill
- 2012: Colin Sutherland, Lord Carloway
- 2016: Leeona Dorrian, Lady Dorrian
- 2025: John Beckett, Lord Beckett

== See also ==
- Lord President of the Court of Session, to whom the Lord Justice Clerk is deputy.
