= 68 Micklegate =

Listed building in York, England

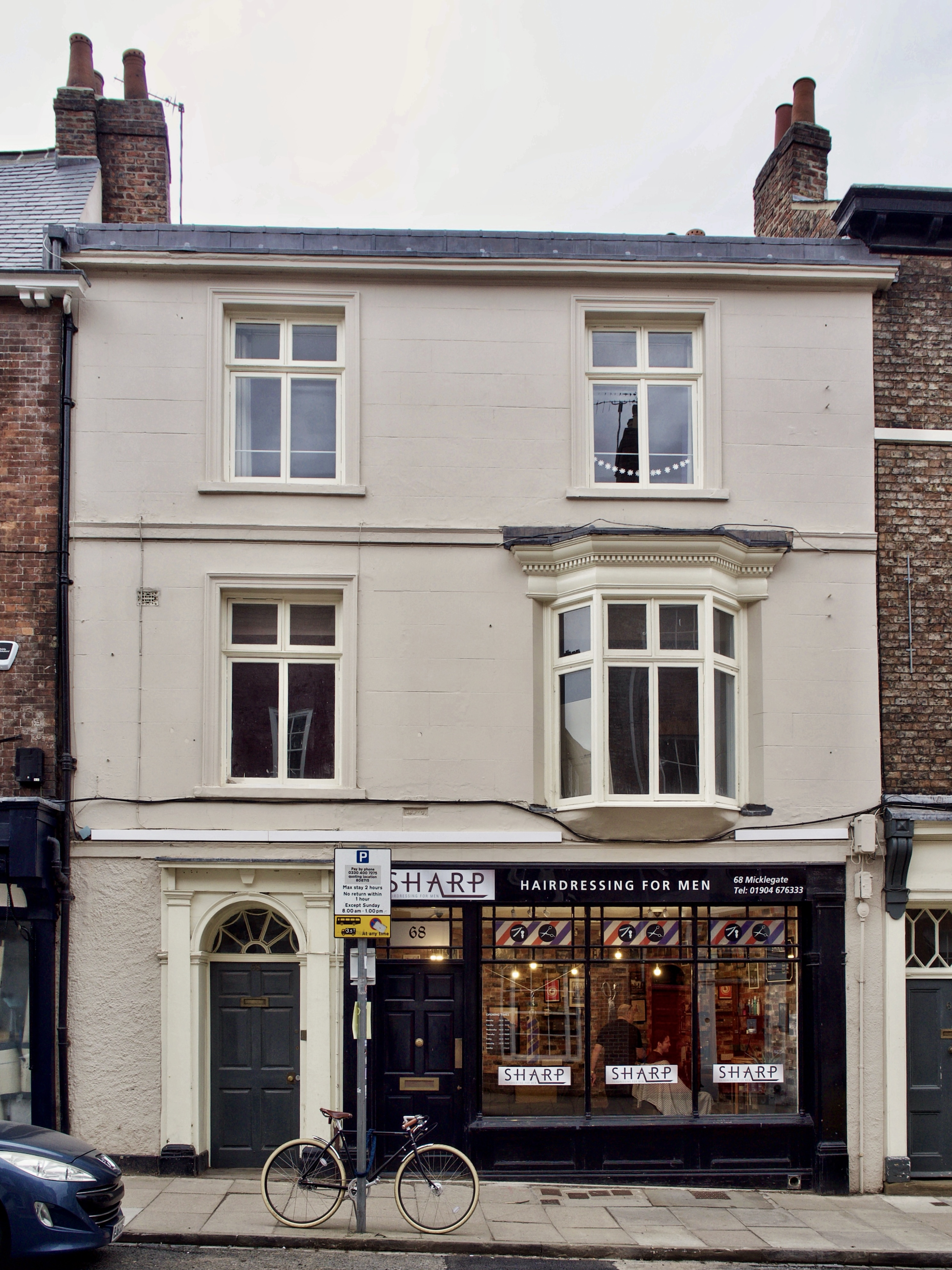
- The building in 2026
- Interactive map of the 68 Micklegate area

General information
- Status: Converted to commercial use with flat above
- Type: House (former)
- Location: Micklegate, York, England
- Coordinates: 53.9573°N 1.0884°W
- Year built: Mid-17th century
- Renovated: c. 1823 (remodelled and storey added); Late 19th and 20th century (altered and renovated)

Listed Building – Grade II*
- Official name: Number 68 and verandah railings attached at rear
- Designated: 1 July 1968
- Reference no.: 1257309

68 Micklegate is a Grade II* listed building on Micklegate in the city of York, England. Built in the mid‑17th century with earlier origins, it was raised with a third storey around 1823, and altered further in the 19th and 20th centuries. From the mid‑17th to early 18th century it was home to the glaziers Edmund and Henry Gyles, and became a meeting place for the York Virtuosi. The building was included in the Central Historic Core conservation area in 1968 and stands between Nos. 62–66, listed at Grade II, and Nos. 70–72, also listed at Grade II*. It is now occupied by a hairdresser on the ground floor, with a private dwelling above.

== History ==
Built in the mid‑17th century on Micklegate, the house has earlier origins and was raised with a third storey around 1823, with further alterations and renovation in the late 19th and 20th centuries. Railings attached to a rear verandah span the basement area.

From around 1650 until 1709, the house was occupied by the glazier Edmund Gyles and later by his son Henry, the noted glass painter. During Henry's time, it became a meeting place for the York Virtuosi, attracting several prominent figures, among them the Leeds antiquarian Ralph Thoresby, the physician Martin Lister, and the artists William Lodge and Francis Place; Place lodged with Henry for a period. In the early 19th century the property passed to William Stead junior, a stonemason who died in 1823, followed by Thomas and William Kirby, who traded as druggists, and later by George Hornby, a surgeon.

On 1 July 1968, No. 68 was designated a Grade II* listed building, and in the same year the site was included within the newly established Central Historic Core conservation area. It stands between Grade II-listed Nos. 62–66, and Nos. 70–72, which are also listed at Grade II*. No. 68 is now occupied by a hairdresser on the ground floor, with the upper floors in use as a private dwelling.

== Architecture ==
The front is finished in render and the rear in brick, with the lower floors painted. A simple cornice and low parapet hide the hipped slate roof. Cast‑iron railings run along the verandah at the back.

The building has a basement and three storeys, with a two‑window front. The entrance has a door surround with plain pilasters, a frieze and a cornice, and a round‑arched opening containing a recessed six‑panel door and a fanlight. A modern shopfront stands to the right. On the first floor, a later canted bay window with a dentilled cornice projects to the right; the other windows have two lights in raised surrounds with painted sills, and all are casements. Narrow bands mark the first and second floors.

At the rear, the building has three storeys and an attic, with a gabled two‑window front. On the ground floor, the right‑hand window is tripartite, with panelled half‑doors below the centre sash opening onto the verandah. The first‑floor window above is also tripartite, with a 12‑pane centre sash. Other windows are 12‑pane sashes set under flat brick arches. A circular window sits in the gable. The railings along the verandah over the basement alternate between straight and serpentine sections.

=== Interior ===
The cellars included a left‑hand room with a plain fireplace, retaining its set pot after the removal of a 19th‑century range, and a right‑hand room with a groined ceiling said to be brick beneath later plaster.

On the ground floor, an entrance passage and stairhall were paved with diagonal flags. A pair of round arches on a central pier marked the transition to the stairhall. The main stair rose to the first floor with a closed string, bulbous balusters, square newels with ball finials, and a broad moulded handrail. Beneath it was an original two‑panel door leading to a stone newel stair to the cellars. Opposite the foot of the main stair, an early‑18th‑century six‑panel door in a fluted surround opened into a small workshop. Two early‑19th‑century six‑panel doors stood at the rear of the hall.

On the first floor, the landing had four moulded doorcases with six‑panel doors, and another with a three‑panel door rehung on iron pins. A closed‑string stair to the second floor, now enclosed, had stick balusters, turned newels and a ramped moulded handrail. The front right room had moulded beams, a cornice and a marble corner fireplace; the front left room had similar beams and a marble chimneypiece with a hob grate. The rear right room retained fielded dado panelling and a plank cupboard door, while the rear left room had a marble chimneypiece with reeded jambs and carved angle blocks.

On the second floor, several reused six‑panel doors survived.

== See also ==
- Grade II* listed buildings in the City of York
- Listed buildings in York (within the city walls, southern part)
