= Henry Gyles =

English glass painter

Henry Gyles or Giles (1640?-1709), was an English glass painter based in York.

== Life ==
He was the fifth child of E. (perhaps Edmund) Gyles, a glazier from York, and lived at 68 Micklegate in the city. His entry in the first edition of the Dictionary of National Biography credits him with "the revival of the art of pictorial glass painting, which had become quite extinct in England." His earliest dated window (1682) is the large west window of York Guildhall. His best-known work is the east window in the chapel of University College, Oxford, presented by Dr. Radcliffe in 1687. Gyles also presented some stained glass for the hall of University College, and did work for Wadham College, Oxford, and for Trinity College and St. Catharine's Hall at Cambridge. In 1700 he painted a large window for Lord Fairfax at Denton, Yorkshire. There were some figures painted by Gyles in the grammar school at Leeds, but these were disposed of in 1784 to a local antiquary. According to the Dictionary of National Biography, "Gyles was not particularly successful in colour or design, and little of his work can now be appreciated, owing to the perishable enamels which he employed."

Gyles was a friend of the antiquary Ralph Thoresby, who frequently mentions him in his diary and correspondence, at one point describing him as "the famousest painter of glass perhaps in the world". Both men were members of the "York Virtuosi", a group of artists and intellectuals who met at Gyles' house. Other members included fellow artists Francis Place, William Lodge and John Lambert, the doctor and naturalist Martin Lister, and the antiquarians Thomas Kirke and Miles Gale. Place often sought commissions for Gyles through his contacts in London, and Place's publisher, Pierce Tempest, provided him with Flemish, Dutch and German prints which he used as sources for his designs. The group's antiquarian interests are reflected in a drawing of Stonehenge by Gyles, once belonging to Thoresby and now in the collection of the Tate Gallery.

Gyles' later years were marred by ill-health, discontent, and domestic tensions. He died at his house in York in October 1709, and was buried in the church of St. Martin-cum-Gregory.

Francis Place engraved his portrait in mezzotint (copied by W. Richardson, and again for Walpole's Anecdotes of Painting); a crayon drawing of Gyles in the collection of the British Museum has traditionally been described as a self-portrait, but may be by one of his fellow York Virtuosi.

He also has some works at York Art Gallery.

== Sources ==
This article incorporates text from a publication now in the public domain: Cust, Lionel Henry (1890). "Gyles, Henry". In Stephen, Leslie; Lee, Sidney (eds.). Dictionary of National Biography. Vol. 23. London: Smith, Elder & Co.
