= Stephen College =

Stephen College (also Colledge) was baptised as Stephen Golledge in Hertfordshire (1637–1681) was an English joiner, activist Protestant, and supporter of the perjury underlying the fabricated Popish Plot. He was tried and executed for high treason, on somewhat dubious evidence, in 1681.

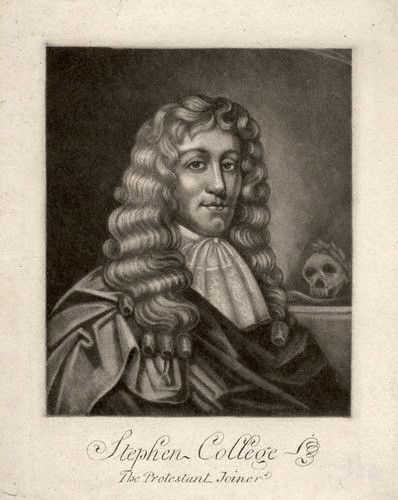
Stephen College, 19th century mezzotint.

== Life ==
He was born in 1637, and worked in the trade of carpentry, hence his nickname "the Protestant joiner". College was a skilled joiner: evidence of his work still survives to this day, in the form of the wooden panelling that he made for the Stationers Hall in 1674. He became known as an anti-Catholic political speaker. He had been a Presbyterian until the Restoration of 1660 when he conformed to the Church of England. He made himself notorious by his declamations against the papists, by writing and singing political ballads, and by inventing a weapon for self-defence at close quarters, which he called 'the Protestant flail'.

He knew many persons of rank. He met his future wife Ann Enock of Swalcliffe Oxfordshire who was employed as a hand maiden by the Ann Countess of Rochester at Adderbury, Stephen was employed by her son John Wilmot, the Earl of Rochester, at his house in Ditchley Oxfordshire. They married and had a daughter, Edith. The Lord William Russell and Lady Berkeley showed him kindness, which inspired him with a desire to rise in the world. He was one of the bitterest opponents of Lord Stafford, and exulted over his condemnation and death.

Among the writings attributed to him are coarse attacks on Catholics including James, Duke of York, the Duchess of Portsmouth, and lawyers including Lord Chief Justice Scroggs, whom he hated for acquitting the royal physician, Sir George Wakeman, of the fabricated charge of attempting to assassinate the King by poison. Among these are 'Truth brought to Light, or Murder will out;' 'Justice in Masquerade, or Scroggs upon Scroggs;' another beginning' Since Justice Scroggs Pepys and Dean did bail;' 'The Pope's Advice and Benediction to his Judge and Jury in Eutopia;' 'The Wolf Justice ' (against Scroggs); 'A Caution,' and 'A Satyr'.

== Trial and execution ==
When Parliament moved to Oxford, in March 1681, College went there on horseback, ostentatiously displaying weapons and wearing defensive armour, speaking threateningly against King Charles II, and advocating resistance. In June 1681, after the condemnation of Edward Fitzharris, College was arrested, carried before Secretary of State Leoline Jenkins on 29 June, and committed to the Tower. He was indicted at the Old Bailey on 8 July for seditious words and actions, but saved by the influence of Slingsby Bethel and Henry Cornish, sheriffs of whig sympathies. They packed a grand jury who returned a verdict of ignoramus, or “we do not know" (i.e., "we know of no reason why he should stand trial").

The government then brought another prosecution, in Oxford. Aaron Smith, a lawyer favoured by William Russell and others of the “country party” or whig opposition, wished to defend College, something the understanding at the time of the adversarial system made problematic. Smith attempted through Henry Starkey to bribe the chief gaoler, Murrel, to obtain access to College. Failing, he gained admission by an order from Sir Robert Sawyer, the attorney-general, and gave papers to College. These papers on examination by the authorities were accounted seditious, or beyond the privileges of defensive counsel as then allowed by law. They were therefore seized. Only mutilated copies were given to the prisoner, after long discussion, when the trial began on 17 August 1681, before Lord Norreys, Lord-chief-justice North, and other judges. The prisoner claimed, as a freeman of London, that he should be tried there, but he was told that for offences committed at Oxford he could be tried at Oxford. He pleaded for restoration of his papers, which would have guided him on how to challenge the jury, and how to conduct his defence. He kept arguing in a circle, and at last pleaded not guilty.

Aaron Smith had next to submit to be browbeaten and to enter into recognisances for his appearance, while Henry Starkey was summoned for attempted bribery. The examination of witnesses lasted until midnight. Stephen Dugdale bore witness of treasonable talk, and that College avowed himself the author of various libels, the pretended 'Letter, intercepted, to Roger L'Estrange', and the ballad of 'The Raree Show,' to the tune of Rochester's 'I am a senseless thing, with a hey.' Other witnesses for the prosecution were Edward Turberville, Masters, Bryan Haynes, the two Macnamaras, and Sir William Jennings. But Shewin, Hickman, and Elizabeth Oliver tried to weaken the credit of Bryan Haynes, and Titus Oates violently assailed Turberville. Witnesses who had formerly been in league against the Catholics were now split. Dugdale, Turberville, and John 'Narrative Smith' swore positively to the guilt of College; Oates, Boldron, and others contradicted their testimony, and exposed the worthlessness of their personal character. At the trial of Lord Stafford, College had been the chief asserter of Dugdale's respectability; now he conducted his own defence by vigorously attacking him. Serjeant Jeffreys argued to the jury that to disbelieve the prosecution witnesses would cast doubt on the Popish Plot itself. He exploited in full the division between the informers, in particular dwelling on the fact that Oates, whom he detested, was not on oath. "Here is Dugdale's oath against Dr. Oates' swearing" he noted with amusement (Oates falsely claimed to be a Doctor of Divinity, and endured much ridicule from Jeffreys as a result).

At nearly two o'clock in the morning the jury retired, and in half an hour gave their verdict of guilty. The court then adjourned until ten o'clock, when sentence of death was pronounced against him. He was visited in prison by two of the university divines, Dr. Marshall and Dr. Hall, who declared him to be penitent. His family was admitted to see him, and attempts were made to obtain a remission of the sentence, but the sole concession granted was that his quarters should be delivered to his friends. On 31 August he was taken in a cart to the place of execution, and made a long speech, chiefly to clear himself from the charge of being a papist. He was then hanged, drawn and quartered by Jack Ketch. His remains were buried the next evening at St. Gregory's Church, by St. Paul's.
