= York Virtuosi =

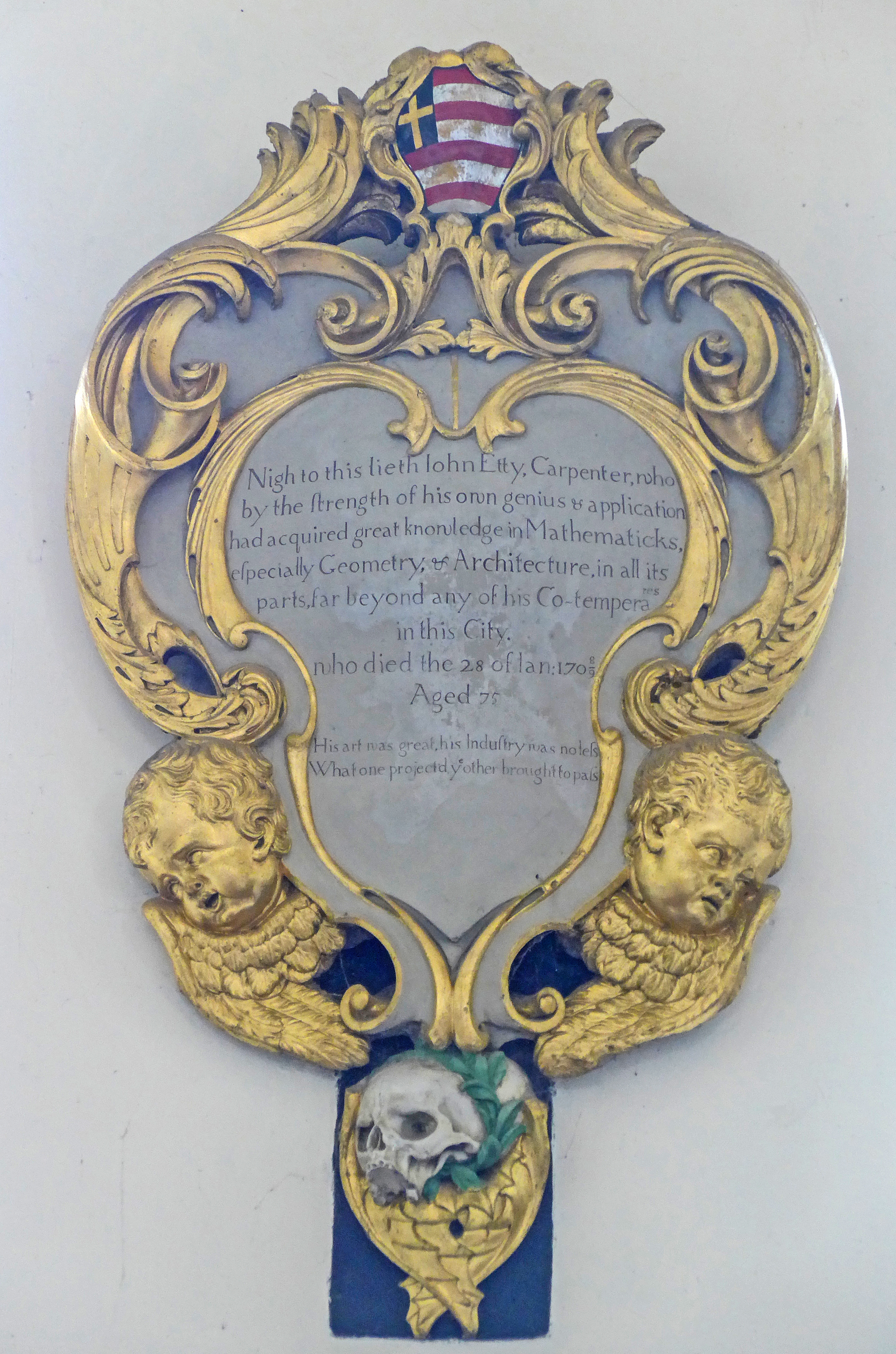
Memorial of Iohn Etty, Carpenter in All Saints'

The York Virtuosi were an informal group of antiquarians, artists and natural philosophers who gathered initially around Martin Lister in York between 1670 and 1683.

They were "at the height of their powers" towards the end of the century, and in this group may be seen the roots of the Yorkshire Philosophical Society (founded 1822) which followed the example of newly founded societies in Leeds, Sheffield and Hull.

Among the group were:

- Martin Lister (c.1638–1712), zoologist, Fellow of the Royal Society and eventually its vice-president
- Ralph Thoresby (1658–1725), antiquarian and topographer
- Henry Gyles (1645–1709) the glass painter;
- Thomas Mann, maker of compasses and waywisers
- Joshua Mann, his brother
- Francis Place (1647–1728), a topographical artist who had apartments in the King's Manor
- William Lodge (1649–1689), engraver and printmaker
- John Lambert (c.1640–1701), son of John Lambert (general)
- Jacques Parmentier (1658–1730), a French painter
- Thomas Kirke (1650–1706), mathematician
- John Etty (1634–1709), architect, whose memorial in All Saint's, North Street, states "By strength of his own genius and application he had acquired great knowedge of Mathematicks, especially Geometry & Architecture in all its parts far beyond any of his co-tempores in the City". He was the father of William Etty.

On the periphery of the group were

- Moses Ashenden, physician
- James Smith, (antiquarian), nephew of Henry Gyles
- George Plaxton, Rector of Barwick in Elmet
- Miles Gale, Rector of Keighley
- Cyril Arthington, (c.1666–1720) Rector of Adel and an FRS.
