= John Savage (engraver) =

John Savage (fl. 1683–1701) was an engraver and printseller in London.

== Life ==
Savage was said to be French, and therefore may have been a Huguenot exile. He resided in Denmark Court, The Strand, until he purchased the plates and took over the business of Isaac Beckett at the Golden Head in the Old Bailey. Later he moved to the Golden Head in St. Paul's Churchyard, a hub of the publishing and printmaking industry near Doctors' Commons.

== Works ==
Savage produced book illustrations and portraits which he published as frontispieces or separately, as well as playing and trade cards, and from 1683 he was the engraver of the plates for the Philosophical Transactions of the Royal Society. Though he had bought Beckett's stock of mezzotint plates and continued to offer mezzotints, the plates he produced himself were only etchings and engravings. His plates included:

- "The Antipapists": portraits of the Duke of Monmouth and Duke of Argyll, Arthur Capell, 1st Earl of Essex, William, Lord Russell, Sir Thomas Armstrong, Alderman Henry Cornish, Algernon Sidney, and Sir Edmund Berry Godfrey, on one sheet;
- Philip V of Spain;
- Arthur Herbert, 1st Earl of Torrington;
- Sir Henry Chauncy (frontispiece to his History of Hertfordshire, 1700);
- Charles Leigh, M.D., after William Faithorne (frontispiece to his Natural History of Lancashire, 1700); and
- Prince Giolo, a South Sea Islander in London in 1692.

Savage etched plates of Marcellus Laroon's Cries of London for the publisher Pierce Tempest. Only two – The Merry Fiddler and The London Quaker – bear Savage's signature but Antony Griffiths, the former Keeper of the Department of Prints and Drawings at the British Museum, attributes all 72 of the series to him.

He also engraved illustrations to Thomas Guidott's De Thermis Britannicis, 1691, John Strype's Memorials of Cranmer, 1694, Leonard Plukenet's Phytographia, vol. ii. 1696, John Evelyn's Numismata, 1697, and Robert Morison's Plantarum Historia, vol. iii. 1699. A pack of mathematical playing cards, published by Thomas Tuttell, was engraved by him from designs by François Boitard.
