= James Laroche (singer) =

British singer

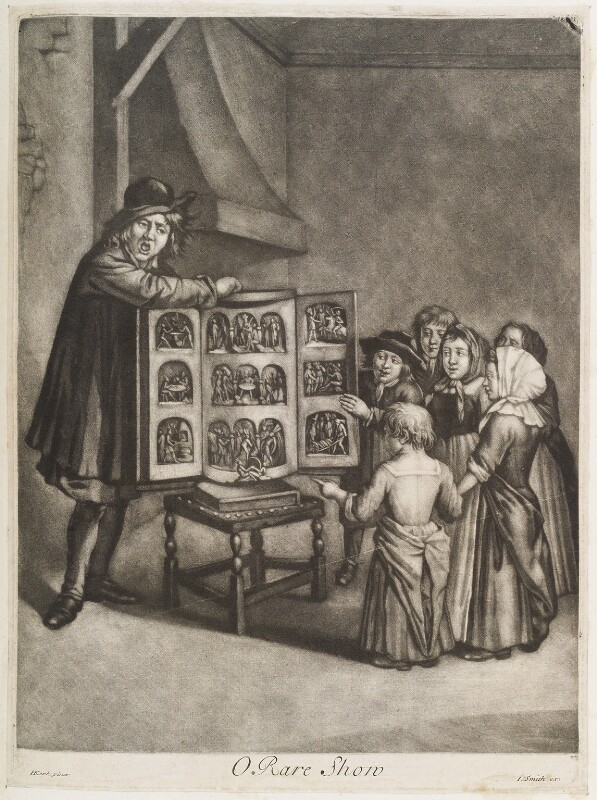
- Laroche by John Smith after Egbert van Heemskerck the Elder
- Occupation: Singer

James Laroche (fl. 1696–1713) was a British singer.

== Biography ==
Laroche appeared while a boy as Cupid in Peter Anthony Motteux's 'Loves of Mars and Venus,' 4to, 1697, which was performed in 1697 at Lincoln's Inn Theatre, a species of musical entr'acte to the 'Anatomist' of Ravenscroft. He is there called Jemmy Laroche. His portrait is given in a rare print entitled 'The Raree Show, sung by Jemmy Laroch in the Musical Interlude for the Peace [of Utrecht] with the Tune set to Music for the Violin [by John Eccles]. Engraved, Printed, Culred, and Sold by Sutton Nicholls, next door to the Jack,' &c., fol., London. It was subsequently published by Samuel Lyne. The engraving exhibits Laroche with the show on a stool, exhibiting it to a group of children. The interlude was played at the theatre in Little Lincoln's Inn Fields in April 1713. Laroche's portrait was also engraved by Marcellus Laroon the elder in his 'Cryes of London,' and subsequently by Smith and Tempest (Evans, Cat. of Engraved Portraits, ii. 240).
