= Pierce Tempest =

Pierce Tempest (1653–1717) was an English printseller, best known for the series Cryes of the City of London.

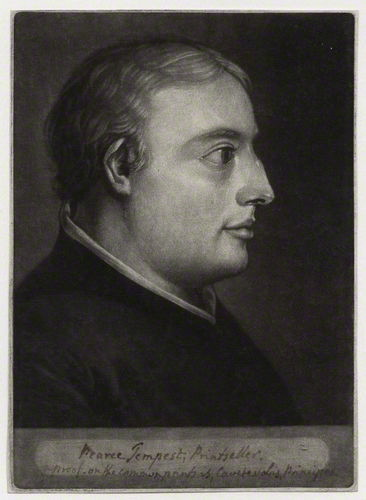
Pierce Tempest.

== Life ==
Born at Tong, Yorkshire, in July 1653, he was the sixth son of Henry Tempest of Tong by his wife, Mary Bushall, and brother of Sir John Tempest, 1st Baronet. It is said that he was a pupil and assistant of Wenceslaus Hollar, and some of the prints which bear his name as the publisher have been assumed to be his own work; but there is no actual evidence that he ever practised engraving.

Tempest died on 1 April 1717, and was buried at St. Paul's, Covent Garden, London. There is a mezzotint portrait of him by Place, after G. Heemskerk, with the motto "Cavete vobis principes", and the figure of a nonconformist minister in the Cryes is said to represent him.

== Works ==
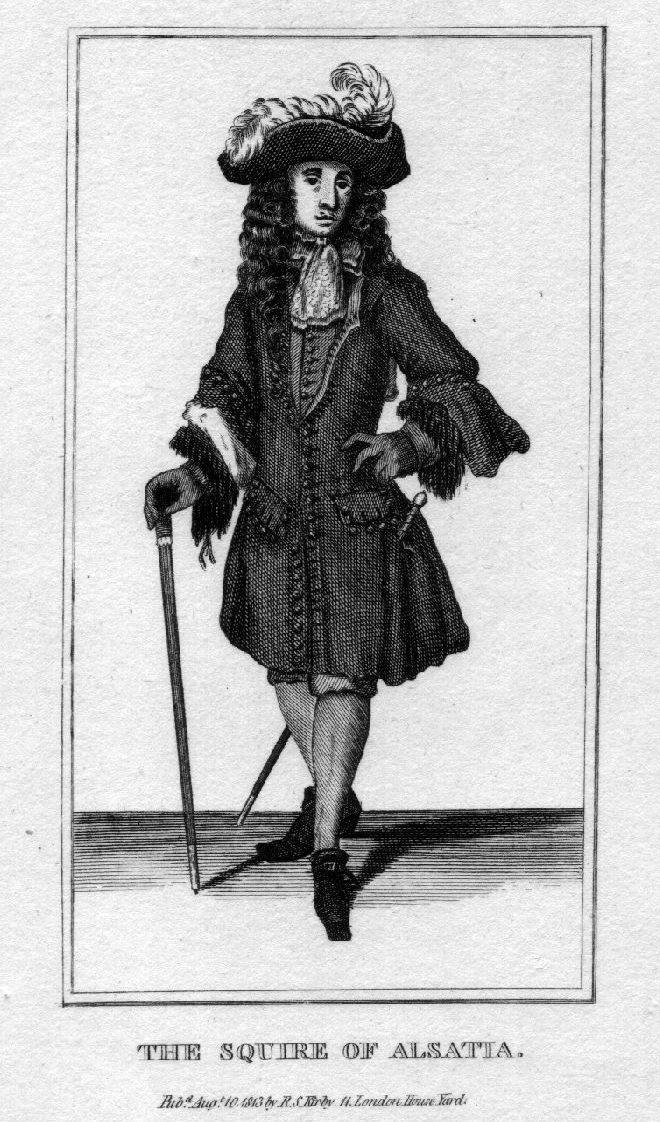
The Squire of Alsatia, from the "Cryes of London" series (but 1813 re-engraving of 1688 original). The title comes from the 1688 play by Thomas Shadwell, but the drawing was based on a real person. According to James Granger, Bully Dawson was sketched from life.

Establishing himself in The Strand as a book and print seller about 1680, Tempest issued some sets of plates of birds and beasts etched by Francis Place and John Griffier from drawings by Francis Barlow; and some mezzotint portraits by Place and others, mainly of royal personages. A translation of Cesare Ripa's Iconologia (1709) was illustrated by Isaac Fuller the younger. Tempest also published William Lodge.

The celebrated Cryes of the City of London, which he published in 1711, was a series of 74 portraits, from drawings by Marcellus Laroon the elder. It shows itinerant dealers and other remarkable characters who at that time frequented London streets. The plates were engraved by John Savage.

== Notes ==
Attribution

This article incorporates text from a publication now in the public domain: "Tempest, Pierce". Dictionary of National Biography. London: Smith, Elder & Co. 1885–1900.
