= Edward Turberville =

Welsh informer and perjurer (died 1681)

Edward Turberville or Turbervile (c. 1648 – 1681) was a Welsh professional soldier and priest hunter, better known to history as an informer who perjured himself in support of the fictitious Popish Plot.

== Life ==
He came from an ancient Glamorganshire family, his father being a native of Sker in that county. He was a younger son and a Roman Catholic, his brother Anthony being a monk in Paris. The family estate at Sker passed on their father's death to the eldest son Christopher.

Edward entered the household of Lady Mary Molyneux, daughter of William Herbert, 1st Marquis of Powis, and remained there until the end of 1675. It was then proposed that he become a monk like his brother, but instead, he entered the French army as a trooper, receiving his discharge at Aire after six months. He spent some time in Douai at the English College, then moved to Paris. It was in Paris in about 1676 (although he was vague about the precise date) that he claimed to have met the English Catholic peer William Howard, 1st Viscount Stafford. Stafford for his part insisted at his trial in 1680 that he had never seen Turberville in his life, and this was probably true, although Stafford was often abroad, and he was certainly in France in 1678.

== Popish Plot ==
Turberville claimed that Stafford had tried to hire him to assassinate King Charles II of England but never explained why he waited so long to reveal the fact. He first told this improbable tale at the Bar of the English House of Commons in November 1680. The Commons was then seeking evidence to proceed with the long-delayed trials of Stafford and the rest of the "five popish lords", which had received a serious setback from the recent death of the leading informer William Bedloe (two prosecution witnesses being necessary in a treason trial) The Commons requested the King to grant Turberville the usual royal pardon for all treasons, felonies and misdemeanours committed before the date of the pardon, and the King duly granted it. Edward had already acted briefly as a priest hunter, using his local knowledge of the large Catholic community in South Wales, but without much success, on one occasion suffering the embarrassment of being arrested himself. Turberville duly gave evidence against Stafford at his trial before the House of Lords on a charge of high treason. Largely on this testimony, Stafford was found guilty and beheaded on 29 December 1680. There were discrepancies between the dates Tuberville gave at the trial and those in the affidavit he had sworn previously. Also, presumably in an effort to add convincing background detail to his story (Titus Oates had always been good at this), he claimed that Stafford suffered from gout, which was untrue. However, Stafford, like all those charged with treason before the Treason Act 1695, was denied legal counsel: he did catch Turberville out in one or two mistakes but did not exploit his advantage as a good lawyer might have. Crucially the Lords were not told that on being received into the Church of England, Turberville told William Lloyd, Bishop of Worcester, that he knew nothing of any Catholic plot, other than a little gossip.

His motives for turning informer seem to have been purely financial: he was a poor man, and remarked that "he was fit for no trade but an informer". His later change of stance he justified by saying that "if the Protestants deserted him, goddamn it, he would not starve." Family loyalty seems to have been no part of his character: during his career as a priest-hunter he attempted to arrest a priest at the home of his brother Christopher at Sker, although he must have known that Christopher would be liable to the death penalty if found guilty of harbouring a priest.

== After the Plot ==
In 1681 the Crown, at last, turned on the instigators of the Plot, beginning with the unsavoury minor informers Edward Fitzharris and Stephen College. After the trial of Fitzharris, Turberville reading the straws in the wind, or as Gilbert Burnet thought, being "under new (i.e. Crown) management" gave evidence against College who was found guilty of treason and executed. This led to a breach between Turberville and Titus Oates, the inventor of the Plot, whom Turberville now denounced as a villain. He also gave evidence against his former patron Anthony Ashley Cooper, 1st Earl of Shaftesbury, who was indicted for treason in November 1681.

The following month he fell ill of smallpox and died, supposedly fulfilling a prophecy of Lord Stafford that Turberville would not outlive him by a year. Despite rumours that he returned to the Catholic faith at the end, in fact, he was attended by Thomas Tenison, the future Archbishop of Canterbury. To the surprise of many, he maintained to the end the truth of his charges against Stafford. Gilbert Burnet wrote that the truth of the matter was a mystery not to be solved in this world.
