= Lindtmayer =

The Lindtmayer family (alternative spellings Lindmeyer, Lindtmeyer, etc.) was a Swiss family of artists specialising in glass painting.

== Background ==
The family was typical of 16th-century families of artisans that passed the trade from father to son. During this period Swiss glass painting underwent a radical shift from predominantly architectural commissions to working within the Kabinettscheibe (independent panel), which was mostly commissioned by lay customers for installation in secular settings. The record of the Lindtmayer shows the increasing importance of the designer (Risser) who furnished drawings for execution by the glass painter, often for a variety of workshops.

== Lindtmayer family ==
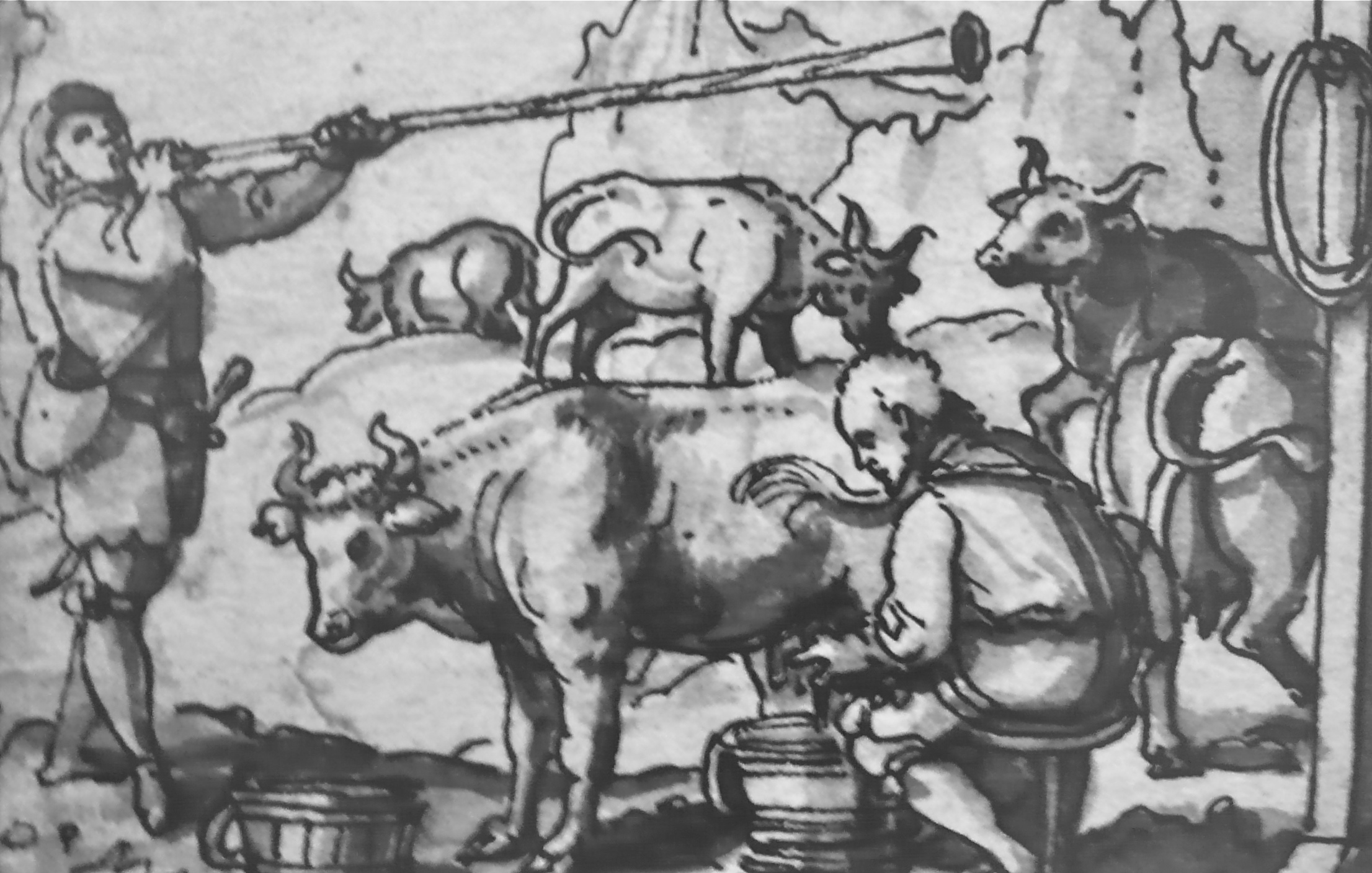
Daniel Lindtmayer, Spielender Hirte (herdsmen), 1601, Reginalmuseum Surselva

Daniel Lindtmayer, born in 1552 in Schaffhausen, Switzerland, was the fourth generation or more of artists who studied under his father, Felix Lindtmayer a glass painter.

Daniel became a stained glass window designer and mural painter. He was also influenced by Tobias Stimmer, an engraver, who had a workshop in Schaffhausen and then moved to the cosmopolitan city of Basel. By 1575 Daniel Lindtmayer also moved to Basel and worked as a stained glass designer, whose work reflected the influences from around Switzerland and the Upper Rhine valley.

Lindtmayer himself was deeply influenced by contemporary prints depicting linear perspective. Packed with detail, his elaborate compositions incorporated Renaissance strapwork, solidly three-dimensional human figures, and architectural frames filled with classical elements.

He was acquitted of attempted murder of a Konstanz goldsmith on the grounds of insanity. From 1598 to about 1601, he lived in Lucerne. He died there between 1602 and 1607.

His surviving work consists of approximately 350 drawings, most of which are designs for stained glass windows. Of the drawings about a dozen are for etchings, woodcuts, and a painting. His works are in the collections of the Art Institute of Chicago, Metropolitan Museum of Art, British Museum, and the J. Paul Getty Museum.

Generations prior to Daniel and his father, Felix include Felix Lindtmayer I (d Schaffhausen, c. 1543), also a glass painter, who is credited with panels from the monastery of St George in the Allerheiligen museum in Schaffhausen and a panel of a corporation at the Schweizer Landesmuseum in Zurich. He is thought to be the son of Baschion Lindtmayer (d 1519), an itinerant glass painter who settled in Schaffhausen.
