= James Holloway (conspirator) =

English merchant (??–1864)

James Holloway (died 1684) was an English merchant from Bristol and a conspirator of the Rye House Plot.

== Life ==
He was apprenticed in Bristol to Walter Stephens, a linendraper and iconoclast. Holloway set up in trade for himself, and carried on business with the West Indies. When the importation of French linens was forbidden, he formed a scheme for the improvement of English linen manufacture. He established a business in Warwickshire, and employed some hundreds of workpeople; but, in spite of the prohibition, French cambrics were still largely imported, and Holloway, having lost money, gave up. In 1679 he pressed the Bristol chamber to help him to carry out his scheme in the city, offering to employ Bristol people only, and to find steady work for five hundred of them. On 8 May the chamber agreed to his proposals, and decided to erect a workhouse for the purpose at the east end of the Bridewell. A letter, however, was sent to them on the 25th by Sir John Knight, alderman, and one of the Members of Parliament for the city, pointing out that the prohibition of French linens would terminate in March 1681. Holloway then went to London to advocate his plan.

In 1680 Holloway became acquainted with the Earl of Essex, who introduced him to Laurence Hyde, the head of the Treasury. Hyde encouraged him to come to London during the next session of parliament, and he exhibited his ware. He also went to Oxford when the parliament was there, and was asked by Lord Clarendon to draw up a bill on linen manufacture. While at London and Oxford he became excited about the Exclusion Crisis. In the summer of 1682 he was actively engaged in a plot against the government, after the election of Tory sheriffs in London. A rising was to be arranged for November in London and other principal towns, the Roman Catholic councillors were to be removed from the court, and offenders punished. He was to be the chief mover in Bristol, and thought that he could secure the city with 350 men, of whom 150 were to come from Taunton. The rising was put off until the spring.

Holloway was in London on 3–6 March 1683, making arrangements with Nathaniel Wade, and went there again on 5 April, when he was informed of the Rye House plot against the persons of the king and the Duke of York. He disapproved of it, but still consorted with the group around Robert West and John Rumsey who were promoting it. On 6 April he had an interview with Robert Ferguson, who was then at the house of Zachary Bourn, a lawyer; Bourn said that Holloway told him that not more than eight persons in Bristol were in the plot, and that he had a store of cannon, powder, and ball, and two ships fit to carry forty guns each. He intended to secure Bristol at 4 A.M., and divided the city into fourteen districts, twenty rebels being assigned to each of thirteen posts, and the rest of the 350 to the main guard at the Tolzey. He expected that his attempt would be successful without bloodshed.

Early in May Holloway was again in London. By this time he had fallen into business difficulties. As soon as he heard of the discovery of the plot on 12 June, he left Bristol, and travelled about as a wool-dealer in Gloucestershire, Oxfordshire, and Somerset. He was summoned to answer a charge of high treason, and not appearing was outlawed; and on 12 July a grand jury found a true bill against him on the evidence of three witnesses. In the middle of August he returned secretly to Bristol, and arranged a passage to France, and then to the West Indies. He sailed on 23 July. He arrived at Barbados on 11 November; but his factor on Nevis betrayed him and he was arrested on Sint Eustatius, sent home in irons, and confined in Newgate Prison.

About 11 April 1684 Holloway sent Sir Leoline Jenkins a confession. He was brought before the king's bench on 21 April on his outlawry, and in the hope of a pardon refused a trial which was offered him by the attorney-general. As he was already attainted by outlawry on an indictment of high treason, no judgment was necessary, and Chief Justice Jeffreys gave the order for his execution. He sent a petition for pardon to the king; and on the 26th he gave a paper with a narrative to the sheriffs. Drawn on a sledge to Tyburn, he professed himself a member of the Church of England. He was hanged and quartered; his head and quarters were sent to Bristol and fixed on the gates.
