= Fitzharris baronets =

Extinct baronetcy in the Baronetage of Ireland

The Fitzharris Baronetcy, of Kilfinin in the County of Limerick, was a title in the Baronetage of Ireland. It was created on 4 November 1622 for Edward Fitzharris. His son, the second Sir Edward, was described as an eminent Royalist during the English Civil War. The title became extinct on the death of the third Baronet around 1704. The notorious Popish Plot informer Edward Fitzharris, executed for treason in 1681, was a younger son of the second Baronet. He had several children, but his male issue must have been dead by 1704 when the title became extinct.

== Fitzharris baronets, of Kilfinin (1622) ==
- Sir Edward Fitzharris, 1st Baronet (died 1640)
- Sir Edward Fitzharris, 2nd Baronet (died c. 1690)
- Sir William Fitzharris, 3rd Baronet (c. 1645 – c. 1704)
