= Giacomo Barri =

Italian painter and printmaker

Giacomo Barri (died 1690) was an Italian painter and printmaker of the Baroque period. He was born in Venice. He etched some plates from his own designs, and in 1671 published a book entitled Viaggio pittoresco d'Italia, with summary vedute of the towns and paintings of great masters from diverse cities of Italy. Within a decade, the book was re-published in English by William Lodge (1649–1689) from Leeds. He also completed an etching of the Nativity after Paolo Veronese.
