= Aaron Smith (conspirator) =

English lawyer (??–1701))

Aaron Smith (died 1701) was an English lawyer, involved in the Popish Plot and Rye House Plot.

== Life ==
Smith, a man of obscure background, had a career as solicitor and was mentioned as a seditious person in a proclamation of 1 June 1677. A frequenter of the Rose Tavern, he associated with Titus Oates and Hugh Speke. He also got to know Sir John Trenchard, and sought the acquaintance of the pro-Dutch intriguers in the pay of William, Prince of Orange. He was a Green Ribbon Club member, listed by Thomas Dangerfield.

On 30 January 1682 he appeared at the bar of the King's Bench on a charge of providing Stephen College with seditious papers for the purposes of his defence. He was tried for this offence the following July, and found guilty of delivering libellous papers to College and using disloyal words. He managed to escape into hiding before the sentence was pronounced, and spent the year in active plotting. He had by this time obtained the confidence of the leaders of the disaffected "country party", and the council, consisting of Monmouth, Russell, Essex, Sidney, and Hampden, despatched him in January 1683 to confer with their friends in Scotland.

When the government got wind of the Rye House plot, they arrested Smith in Axe Yard on 4 July and committed him to the Tower. He was thought to be deeply implicated in the plot, but little could be proved against him. On 27 October he was sentenced for his previous offence to a fine, two hours in the pillory, and to remain in prison pending security for good behaviour. Mentioned in Nathan Wade's list of the members of the "King's Head Club" in October 1685, he was released from the King's Bench Prison in March 1688.

After the Glorious Revolution Smith brought forward claims to reward. On 9 April 1689 King William made him solicitor to the treasury, and then public prosecutor. Most of his charges were thrown out by the grand juries, while he was at odds with the attorney-general, Sir George Treby. In November 1692 he was summoned before the House of Lords to explain the procedure which had been followed upon the arrest of Lords Marlborough and Huntingdon. When Trenchard became secretary of state (northern department) in 1693, Smith's activity against suspects and Jacobites was redoubled. On slight preliminary evidence, he travelled to Lancashire with two informers, Taafe and Lunt. Some compromising letters and some arms behind a false fireplace were discovered, and five Lancashire gentlemen were arrested; but Ferguson and other pamphleteers alluded to the plot as a ridiculous sham; Taafe changed sides at the last moment, and at the trial at Manchester in October 1694 the prisoners were acquitted. Smith was charged with fabricating the depositions of the witnesses for the prosecution, and (by his own side) with having mismanaged the affair.

Smith was widely suspected of corruption in his public office and in February 1696 he was questioned by the House of Commons over his accounts. Failing to deliver his accounts to the commissioners appointed to examine them by 18 February, he was ordered to be taken into custody, and on 25 July 1696, he was dismissed from his employment. Four months later he attended at the bar of the house and pleaded illness. He was given an extension until 16 January 1697, but he failed to put in an appearance. He spent his last years in obscurity.

== Notes ==
Attribution

This article incorporates text from a publication now in the public domain: "Smith, Aaron (d.1697?)". Dictionary of National Biography. London: Smith, Elder & Co. 1885–1900.
