= 70 and 72 Micklegate =

Listed building in York, England

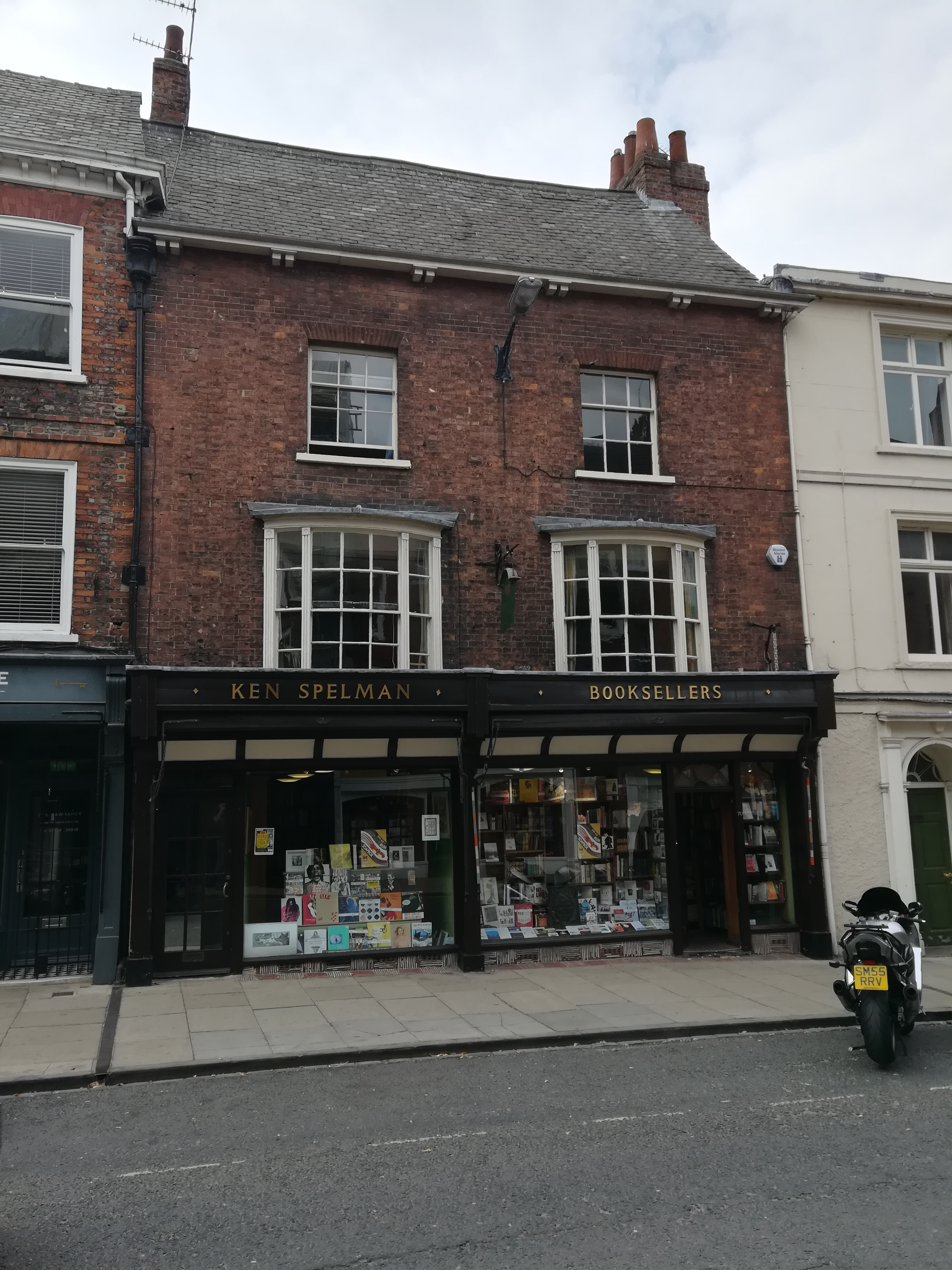
- The building in 2018
- Interactive map of the 70 and 72 Micklegate area

General information
- Status: Converted to retail use
- Type: House (former)
- Location: Micklegate, York, England
- Coordinates: 53°57′26″N 1°05′18″W
- Completed: c. 1500; 526 years ago
- Renovated: 17th century (floor added, rear extended); Early 19th century (altered, rear extended, refronted); Early 20th century (shopfronts) c. 1970–1980 (altered, partly demolished and rear rebuilt)

Technical details
- Floor count: 3

Design and construction
- Designations

Listed Building – Grade II*
- Official name: 70 and 72, Micklegate
- Designated: 14 June 1954
- Reference no.: 1257313

70 and 72 Micklegate is a shop in the city centre of York, England.

The building originated around 1500, as a two-storey timber-framed house on the north side of Micklegate, a major route into the city. In the 17th century, a third storey was added, and around the same time the whole building was extended to the rear. From 1802, the building was occupied by a saddler, who sublet parts of the large house, and made extensive alterations. The building was refronted in 1823, and further extensions were added to the rear. The rear extensions were partially demolished and rebuilt between 1970 and 1980.

The building's facade is of dull red brick with narrow mortared joints. There are bow windows at first floor level, and at roof level there is a cornice and an early drainpipe. The ground floor shopfront is 20th-century, although an early fanlight survives above the door to No. 70. Inside, 17th-century doors survive in the attic of No. 70, while there is a reused door from about 1700 on the second floor. The decoration in the front room on the first floor dates from the Regency period, and the staircase is from the 1800s. In No. 72, the staircase and much of the decoration dates from around 1810.

From 1948 the entire building was occupied by Ken Spelman Books, until it closed in January 2022. The building has been Grade II* listed since 1954, and stands between No. 68, which is also listed at Grade II*, and Nos. 74 and 76, listed at Grade II.

== See also ==
- Grade II* listed buildings in the City of York
- Listed buildings in York (within the city walls, southern part)
