= Marcellus Laroon =

Dutch painter

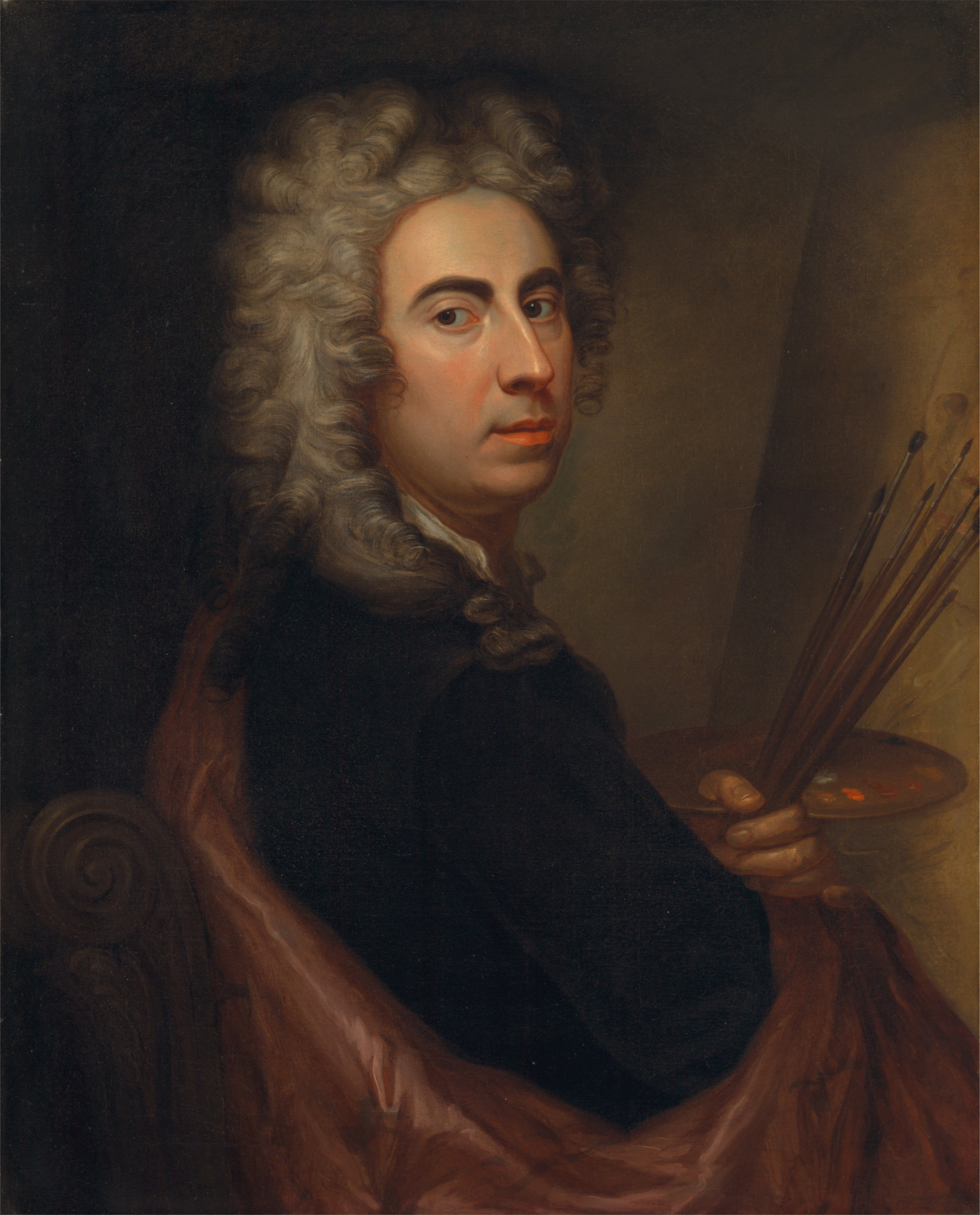
Self-portrait of Marcellus Laroon, ca. 1700

Marcellus Laroon or Lauron, the elder (1653–1702) was a Dutch-born painter and engraver, active in England. He provided the drawings for the popular series of prints The Cries of London.

== Life ==
He was born at The Hague, the son of Marcellus Lauron, a painter of French extraction who settled in the Netherlands. He began his artistic education with his father, who took him to be taken to England at an early age. According to brief biographies by Horace Walpole and Bainbrigg Buckeridge he was taught by one "La Zoon" before studying under one of the Flessiers, a family of Dutch painters and framemakers working in London in the mid-17th century.

He spent several years in Yorkshire, and later told George Vertue that he had seen Rembrandt at Kingston upon Hull in 1661. He had settled in London by 1674, the year in which he became a member of the Painter-Stainers Company. He lived in Bow Street, Covent Garden. He was frequently employed to paint draperies for Sir Godfrey Kneller, and was well known as a copyist.

His self-portrait showed the scars resulting from injuries received in a street fight.

== Works ==
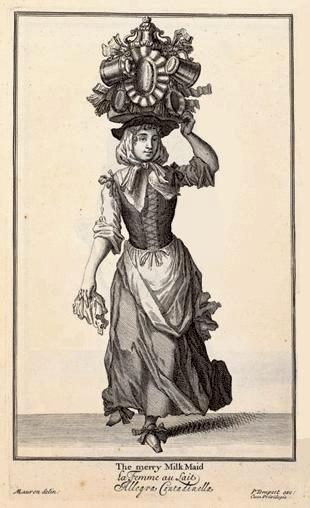
The Merry Milk Maid, engraving by John Savage after Laroon.

Laroon became known for small portraits and conversation pieces. He also painted small pictures, on humorous or free subjects, in the style of Egbert van Heemskerk, some of which were engraved in mezzotint by Isaac Beckett and John Smith. He also made some etchings and mezzotints on similar subjects himself. Buckeridge said of his painting

When he came to work for himself, he made it his endeavour to follow nature very close, so that his manner was wholly his own. He was a general Painter, and imitated other masters hands exactly well. He painted well, both in great and little, and was an exact draftsman; but he was chiefly famous for drapery, wherein he exceeded most of his cotemporaries [sic].

Laroon is best known for the drawings he made of The Cryes of London, which were engraved by John Savage, and published by Pierce Tempest. He also drew the illustrations for 'The Art of Defence', a fencing manual by William Elder published in 1699 and the procession at the coronation of William III and Mary in 1689. He painted portraits of Queen Mary (engraved in mezzotint by Robert Williams), Caius Gabriel Cibber the sculptor, and others. Some drawings by him entered the collection of the British Museum.

== Family ==
He married the daughter of Jeremiah Keene, a builder, of Little Sutton, near Chiswick, by whom he had a large family, including three sons, who were brought up in his profession.

== Death ==
He died of consumption at Richmond, Surrey on 11 March 1702, and was buried there. He left a collection of pictures, which was sold by auction by his son Marcellus Laroon the Younger on 24 February 1725.
