= Thomas Armstrong (English politician) =

English Army officer and politician

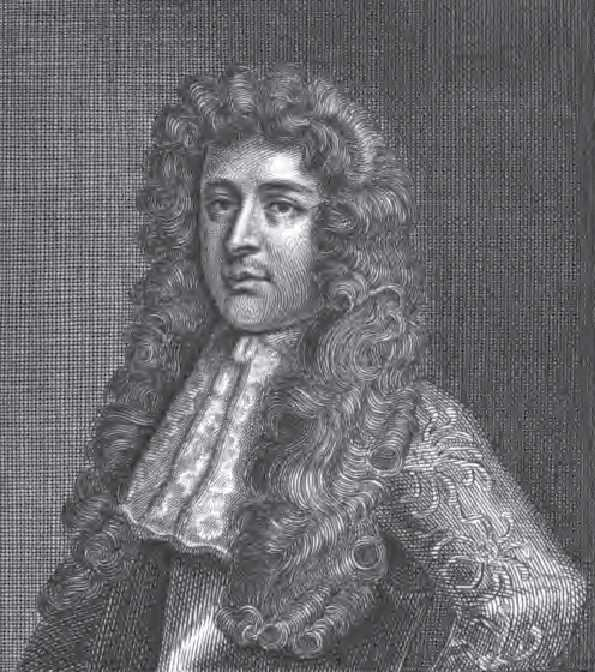
An engraving of Armstrong

Sir Thomas Armstrong (c. 1633 – 20 June 1684) was an English Army officer and politician who was executed for treason.

His father, Colonel Sir Thomas Armstrong (died November 1662) fought in the 30 Years War in the Netherlands, was a royalist soldier during the English Civil War, and was twice imprisoned in the Tower of London by Oliver Cromwell during the Commonwealth.

Following his implication in the Rye House Plot in 1683, Armstrong was hanged, drawn and quartered for high treason.

== Life ==
During the Interregnum Armstrong was a supporter of Charles II, participating in the plot to seize Chester Castle in 1655, and carrying funds from Aubrey de Vere, 20th Earl of Oxford to Charles in exile. He was possibly imprisoned for a year on his return. In 1657, he married Catherine, daughter of James Pollexfen and niece of Edward Hyde, 1st Earl of Clarendon.

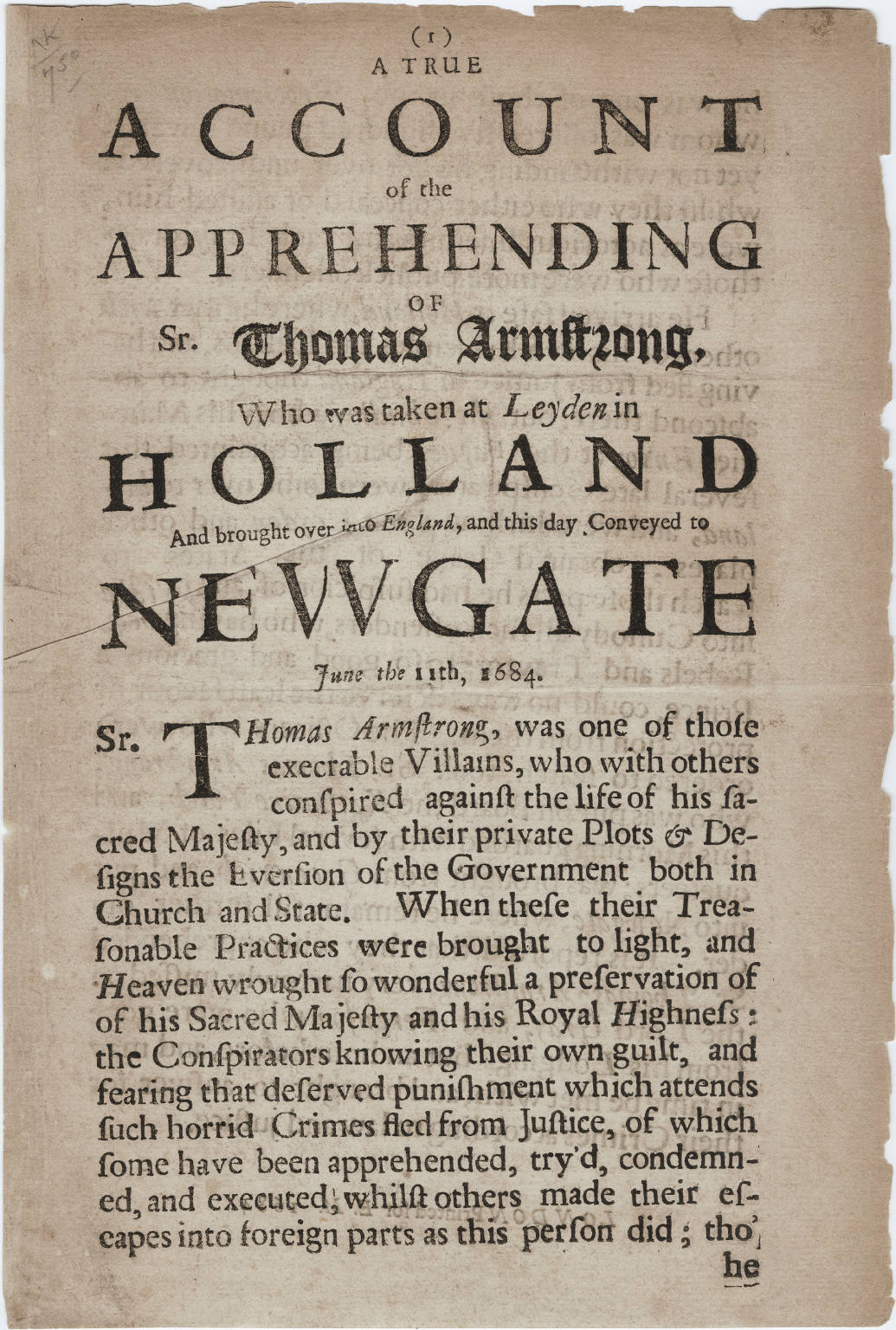
A True Account of the Apprehending of Sir Thomas Armstrong, printed at London, 1684

Following the Restoration, he received, in February 1661, a commission as captain-lieutenant in the Royal Horse Guards. In August 1675, Armstrong killed the son of one of the queen's ladies-in-waiting at a London theatre. Armstrong was pardoned on the grounds that his opponent had drawn first.

Armstrong served with James Scott, 1st Duke of Monmouth in France from 1672, fighting at the Siege of Maastricht (1673) and alongside the Dutch, in 1678. He was wounded at St Denis. In 1679, he helped suppress the covenanter rising and fought at the battle of Bothwell Bridge, at the same time that the Popish Plot in England was scaring the Anglican establishment.

Monmouth's influence secured him as MP for Stafford in March 1679 to the First Exclusion Parliament.

== Death ==
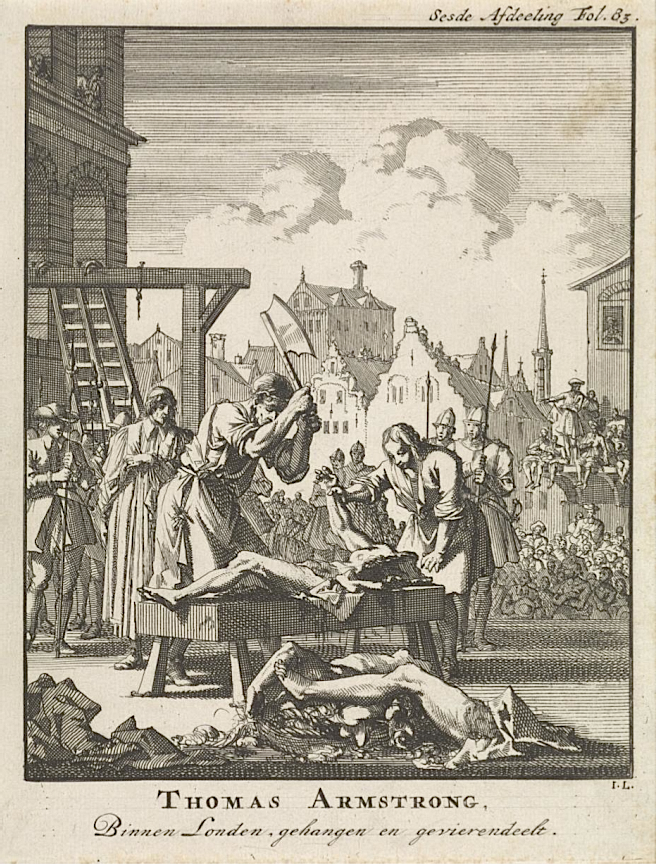
Engraving attributed to Jan Luyken depicting the execution of Sir Thomas Armstrong in 1684

Following the Rye House Plot, in 1683, he was indicted in the Court of King's Bench for high treason. A wanted man, Armstrong fled to Cleves and then Rotterdam but was captured in Leiden and sentenced to death by Judge George Jeffreys.

He made a dignified end on the gallows at Tyburn on 20 June 1684, protesting that he died "a true and sincere Protestant ... and in the communion of the Church of England; and I heartily wish I had more strictly lived up to the religion which I believed". His lands and bonds totalling £12,700 were saved from forfeiture under his marriage settlement. Nevertheless, his trial was widely regarded as a flagrant miscarriage of justice. He was dragged by hurdle to Tyburn, where he was hanged, drawn and quartered, on 20 June 1684. His head was affixed to Westminster Hall, three of his quarters were displayed in London, and the fourth at Stafford.

Parliament of England
Preceded by William Chetwynd; Walter Chetwynd	Member of Parliament for Stafford; 1679–1684; With: Walter Chetwynd 1679; Sir Thomas Wilbraham 1679–1681; Edwin Skrymsher 1681–1684	Succeeded by Edwin Skrymsher
