= Abraham P. Holmes =

South Carolina legislator

Abraham P. Holmes was a state legislator in South Carolina. He represented Colleton County in the South Carolina House of Representatives from 1870 to 1874. He was described as "mulatto". He was honored in a legislative resolution as an African American.

== See also ==
- African American officeholders from the end of the Civil War until before 1900
