= Thomas Walcot (lieutenant colonel) =

Col. Thomas Walcot (1625 – July 20, 1683) born in Warwickshire as the fourth son of Charles Walcot and Elizabeth Games, was a Puritan and lieutenant colonel in the Parliamentary Army.

== Biography ==
He married Jane Blayney, daughter of Thomas Blayney and niece of Edward Blayney, 1st Baron Blayney. In 1655, he purchased Ballyvarra Castle and later, in 1659, settled at Croagh, County Limerick, Ireland, managing an estate worth £800 per annum, along with lands in Lower Conneloe. Though offered the Governorship of Carolina, he declined.

In 1672, Walcot was arrested on suspicion of aiding a Dutch invasion of Ireland but was exonerated after eight months in the Tower of London.

In July 1683, Walcot was implicated in the Rye House Plot, a conspiracy to assassinate King Charles II and James, Duke of York. He was tried for high treason at the Old Bailey on July 12, 1683, and executed on July 20, 1683, at Tyburn Hill. His remains were hanged, drawn, and quartered, with his head displayed at Aldgate.

Walcot’s cousin, William Russell, Lord Russell, and Algernon Sidney were also executed in connection with the plot. His attainder was reversed in 1696, restoring his legacy to his eldest son, John, under King William III of England.
