= William Lodge =

William Lodge (July 4, 1649 – 1689) was an English engraver and printmaker of the Baroque period.

== Life ==
He was born in Yorkshire, where his father was a merchant, and he inherited a degree of financial independence. Lodge was educated first at Leeds, then at Jesus College in Cambridge, then studied law at Lincoln's Inn. He however mostly appears to have been employed in drawing and engraving. He was a friend of the fellow engraver, Francis Place, and enjoyed an informal salon of intellectuals at York. These included Dr. Martin Lister, Ralph Thoresby, and Henry Gyles the glass painter.

== Works ==
Lodge is known best for his engravings. When he accompanied Thomas Belasyse, Earl of Fanconbery, on his embassy to Venice, he became acquainted with a picture book, Viaggio Pittoresco, by Giacomo Barri). The chapters were introduced by a vedute of a city or town of Italy, and followed by a series of engravings of famous paintings in that locus. Lodge had the book republished, copying images. It was entitled The Painter's Voyage of Italy, in which all the famous paintings of the most eminent Masters are particularised, as they are preserved in the several cities of Italy.

He also engraved scientific papers for Martin Lister. He is known to have engraved a portrait of Oliver Cromwell. He was an avid draughtsman of landscapes throughout England, Wales, and Ireland.
