= Slingsby Bethel =

- Slingsby Bethel

Member of Parliament for Knaresborough
- In office 1659–1660

Sheriff of London and Middlesex
- In office 24 June 1680 – 1681

Personal details
- Born: 27 February 1617 Alne, North Yorkshire, England
- Died: February 1697 (aged 79) England
- Party: Independent (Whig supporter)
- Spouse: Mary Burrell (allegedly)
- Children: None recorded
- Occupation: Politician, Sheriff of London
- Known for: Republican sympathies during the English Civil War

Slingsby Bethel (1617–1697) was a Member of Parliament with republican sympathies, during the period of the English Civil War.

== Early life ==
Slingsby Bethel was the third son of Sir Walter Bethel of Alne, North Yorkshire, who married Mary, the second daughter of Sir Henry Slingsby of Scriven, near Knaresborough and Frances Vavasour, and was baptised at Alne 27 February 1617. Being a younger son, he was placed in business, and went to Hamburg in 1637, staying there until December 1649.

== Civil war period ==
He was strongly opposed to the cause of the cavaliers, but did not approve of the conduct of the Protector, nor did he, as member for Knaresborough in the parliament of 1659, support Richard Cromwell's adherents in their efforts to procure his succession as protector with unlimited powers of action. In the new council of state appointed to hold office from 1 January 1660, he was the last of the ten non-parliamentary members. When the estates of his uncle, Sir Henry Slingsby, the unfortunate cavalier who suffered for his devotion to the royal cause, were sequestered, they were bought in for his family by Mr. Stapylton and Slingsby Bethel; the letters which passed between them on this matter are printed in the Diary of Sir Henry Slingsby (1836), pp. 344–54, 411.

== After the Restoration ==
Through success in trade and through his family descent, he acquired considerable property in the East Riding of Yorkshire, and for many years after the Restoration, he passed a retired life in London, living on his means, and taking no active part in opposition to a government which he distrusted. But on 24 June 1680, Bethel, who was a member of the Worshipful Company of Leathersellers (elected Master for 1692–93), and Henry Cornish, were chosen sheriffs of London and Middlesex, though they were unable to serve in consequence of their not having taken the oaths commanded by the Corporation Act. The country was divided into two parties through religious and political differences; Bethel and his colleague being the candidates of the whig and popular party in the city. Roger North, the tory historian, in his Examen, p. 93, says of them that 'the former used to walk about more like a corncutter than sheriff of London. He kept no house, but lived upon chops, whence it is proverbial for not feasting "to Bethel the city"'; and Dryden, in the first part of his Absalom and Achitophel threw at Bethel, under the name of Shimei, all the slanders of his opponents.

By Burnet the whig historian Bethel was styled 'a known republican in principle' and 'a sullen and wilful man,' and he adds that the selection of these candidates gave some plausibility to the rumour that the king would not have justice done him against his enemies, as Bethel 'had expressed his approving the late king's death in very indecent terms', whilst their taking the sacrament, though they were independents, to qualify themselves for the office, damaged the anti-court party (History of own Times (1823 ed.), ii. 241-43). This last remark of Burnet refers to the fact that before the date of the second election Bethel and Cornish had duly qualified, and that thereupon they were elected by a large majority over the court candidates.

On their retirement in 1681, they were thanked by the grand jury for the city, but Bethel was defeated on 5 September in his candidature for the aldermanship of Bishopsgate ward. The sheriffs were accused, with Sir Robert Clayton and others, of having visited Edward Fitzharris in Newgate with a message from Lord Howard that nothing would save his life but a discovery of the popish plot; but the accusation was promptly denied in a pamphlet called Truth vindicated, 1681, which is re-printed in the State Trials, viii. 411-25. Several pamphlets were published on the conduct of the sheriffs in taking the sacrament, and on Bethel's attempt to be returned for Southwark at the election of February 1681. A folio tract published in his interest at this election, entitled The Vindication of Slingsby Bethel (1681), gave an emphatic denial to the assertion of his antagonists that he was a papist, a Jesuit, a cruel soldier in the parliamentary army, a judge of the late king, and an assistant at the scaffold when King Charles was executed. He was defeated at the poll for the borough of Southwark, and in the following October was fined five marks for assaulting a watchman at the election day, the fact being that he had removed two men who were preventing his electors from tendering their votes (The Trial of Slinqsby Bethel (1681), and State Trials, viii. 747-58). In the same month of October 1681, Bethel showed his liberality by a gift of several hundred pounds for the relief of poor prisoners for debt.

In July 1682, he thought it prudent to retire to Hamburg, and there he remained until February 1689. Whilst absent he was found guilty and heavily fined, with several others (8 May 1683), for an assault on the preceding midsummer day at the election of sheriffs, a proceeding which was generally condemned. After the accession of William III and Mary II the convicted persons presented a petition to the king, praying him to except out of his act of grace all those who were concerned in this prosecution (The humble Petition of Sir Thomas Pilkinyton, Slingsby Bethel, &c.) Bethel died early in February 1697. In Foster's Yorkshire Pedigrees (vol. ii.) he is said to have married Mary Burrell of Huntingdon; but if this statement is correct, he was a widower in 1681.

== Works ==
Bethel was the author of several works. In 1659, he published A true and impartial Narrative of the most material Debates and Passages in the late Parliament reprinted in Somers Tracts (1748), iv. 524-33, in vol. vi. of the 1809 edition of the same work, and again as an appendix to his anonymous tract, The Interest of Princes and States, 1680. Most of the discourses in the last-mentioned volume were written many years previously, when the author was on his travels. They advocated freedom of trade and liberty of conscience. The World's Mistake in Oliver Cromwell (anon.), 1668, contained a severe censure of Cromwell's foreign policy, and of his conduct towards Lilburne and Sir Henry Vane. Another of Bethel's anonymous pamphlets, Observations on the Letter written to Sir Thomas Osborn, 1673, by the Duke of Buckingham, advocated the support of the Dutch Republic against France. The last of his works, The Providence of God observed through several ages towards this Nation (anon.), 1691, re-published in 1694 and 1697, dealt mainly with the proceedings under the Stuarts for the establishment of arbitrary power.
