= Henry Cornish =

London alderman (d. 1685)

Henry Cornish (died 1685) was a London alderman, executed in the reign of James II of England.

== Life ==
He was a well-to-do merchant of London, and alderman of the ward of St Michael Bassishaw; in the London Directory for 1677 he is described as a factor residing in 'Cateaton Street, near Blackwelhall Gate.' He was a presbyterian in religion, and in politics was a strong whig. On 24 June 1680 he was chosen sheriff of London in conjunction with Slingsby Bethel. It was afterwards discovered that Cornish and his colleague had not taken the oath according to the Corporation Act, and the election was declared void. A second election was fixed for 17 July, when Cornish and Bethel took the oath under the Corporation Act, and claimed the appointment.

Charles II decided to force on the city two sheriffs of his own choosing, named Box and Nicolson. The latter demanded a poll, which lasted until 22 July, and on the 29th Cornish and Bethel were declared elected. Cornish headed the poll with 2,400 votes.' On 14 May 1681 Cornish, with other members of the corporation, went to Windsor to present a petition to the king for the summoning of parliament, but Charles declined to receive the deputation. Cornish appeared as a witness for the defence at the trial of Edward Fitzharris, a Catholic informer (9 June 1681); this may have been due to a misconception.

On 18 January 1682 he was one of the five aldermen on the committee of defence against the quo warranto writ brought against the charter of the city of London. On 3 July 1682 proceedings were taken against him by the court for rioting and abetting riots in the city on the occasion of the election of sheriffs in the preceding June, when the lord mayor, a friend of the court, had been roughly handled. On 8 May 1683, Cornish was convicted, and on 26 May was fined. In October 1682 the city whigs desired to choose Cornish as lord mayor; three candidates were nominated for the office, but by the wholesale rejection of votes, Cornish was defeated. He polled only forty-five votes below the successful candidate, although he stood at the bottom of the poll.

John Rumsey, arrested on suspicion of complicity in the alleged Rye House Plot in 1683, was aware of Cornish's unpopularity with the authorities, and offered to produce evidence implicating the alderman in the conspiracy. The offer was not accepted, because no other testimony against Cornish was forthcoming. But Cornish was narrowly watched by the agents of the court, and since he proved himself no more conciliatory to James II than to his brother, it was deemed advisable in 1685 to remove him. Goodenough, an attorney whom Cornish had antagonised by declining to make him his deputy-sheriff in 1680, arranged with Rumsey to corroborate the false testimony with regard to the Rye House plot, and to add evidence proving an attachment for the Duke of Monmouth. In the middle of October 1685 Cornish was arrested suddenly, and committed to Newgate Prison on a vague charge of high treason. The trial took place at the Old Bailey on Monday, 19 October; Rumsey and Goodenough gave evidence, and Cornish was convicted and condemned to death. Benjamin Calamy attended him in prison. Four days later he was executed in Cheapside, at the corner of King Street, within sight of his own house. The indignation which he displayed in his speech from the scaffold led enemies to state that he died drunk, but William Penn, who witnessed the execution, declared that Cornish showed the resentment of an outraged man. After his body had been cut down and quartered it was buried in the church of St Lawrence by the Guildhall.

Reversing Henry Cornish's Attainder Act 1688
- Act of Parliament
- Parliament of England
- Long title: An Act for reversing the Attainder of Henry Cornish Esquire, late Alderman of the City of London.
- Citation: 1 Will. & Mar. c. 16 Pr.
- Territorial extent: England and Wales

Dates
- Royal assent: 22 June 1689
- Commencement: 13 February 1689 (Note: Start of session.)

Status: Current legislation

On 30 January 1689 an act of Parliament, the Reversing Henry Cornish's Attainder Act 1688 (1 Will. & Mar. c. 16 Pr.) was passed reversing the attainder of Cornish. An account of Cornish's trial appeared in 1685; his last speech in the press-yard of Newgate was issued, together with the last words of Richard Rumbold. Remarks on the Tryal of Henry Cornish, an attack on the judicial procedure at the trial, was written by Sir John Hawles, solicitor-general under William III.

== Bibliography ==
- This article incorporates text from a publication now in the public domain: "Cornish, Henry". Dictionary of National Biography. London: Smith, Elder & Co. 1885–1900.
- Old Bailey Proceedings Online (www.oldbaileyonline.org, version 8.0, 14 December 2019), Ordinary of Newgate's Account, October 1685 (OA16851023).
- Old Bailey Proceedings Online (www.oldbaileyonline.org, version 8.0, 14 December 2019), October 1689 (o16891009-1).
