= Francis Place (artist) =

English painter

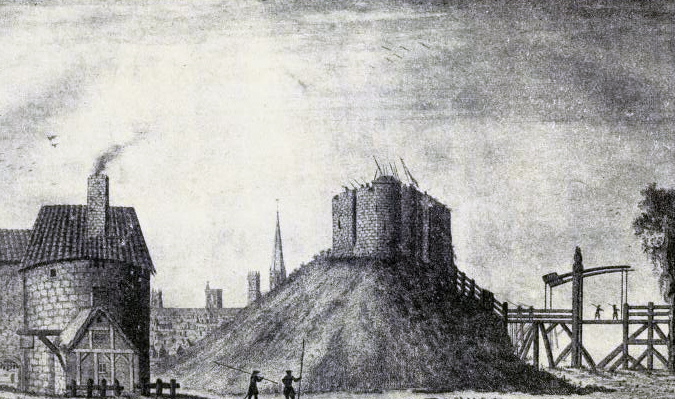
York Castle (1644, engraving by William Henry Toms)

Francis Place (1647 – 21 September 1728) was an English gentleman draughtsman, potter, engraver and printmaker, active mainly in York.

== Biography ==
He was the fifth son of Rowland Place (1616–1680) of Dinsdale, county Durham, and his wife, Catherine (died 1670), daughter and coheiress of Charles Wise of Copgrove, Yorkshire.

Place entered law as his father had done, and was articled to an attorney at Gray's Inn until the outbreak of the plague forced him to leave both the profession and London in 1665. By this time, Place had already discovered a gift for drawing and engraving through his close friend Wenceslaus Hollar.

About 1680 Place's interests and activities widened further as he became involved with the antiquarian group the York virtuosi, where he eventually settled. Place became a friend of many artists and antiquarians in and around York, including Ralph Thoresby and William Lodge, with whom Place went on many drawing and angling excursions.

As a result of the Popish Plot, during one trip to Wales, Place and Lodge found themselves imprisoned as suspected Jesuit spies.

Place's virtuosity and enthusiasm led him to experiment with oil painting from 1680, stoneware pottery glazing, and the manufacture of porcelain from 1683, which he abandoned in 1694 owing to his lack of commercial success. Only four of his marbled greyware pots are known to have survived, one of which is in the Victoria and Albert Museum, London.

About 1680 Place married Mrs Ann Wintringham, with whom he had one daughter, Elizabeth; presumably his wife died, and he married Mrs Ann Wilkinson (1662/1663–1752) in 1693, with whom he had two daughters, Ann and Frances. Place painted himself in oil, possibly at the time of this second marriage (Arbroath collection). He died at his home, King's Manor, York, on 21 September 1728, aged eighty-one, and was buried in St Olave's Church, York.

== References and further reading ==
- Lee, Sidney, ed. (1896). "Place, Francis (1647-1728)" . Dictionary of National Biography. Vol. 45. London: Smith, Elder & Co.
- Tyler, Richard E. G. Francis Place: An artist in the age of observation (1971)
