= Edward Fitzharris =

Anglo-Irish conspirator

Edward Fitzharris (1648? – 1681) was an Anglo-Irish conspirator. His prosecution following the waning of public belief in the Popish Plot hoax became a struggle for jurisdiction involving the courts and the two Houses of Parliament. He was executed for treason in 1681.

== Life ==
The younger son of Sir Edward Fitzharris (died c.1690), 2nd Baronet of the Fitzharris Baronets of Kilfinin, and his wife Eileen FitzGerald, daughter of Sir Thomas FitzGerald, Knight of Glin, he was born in County Limerick, Ireland about 1648, and brought up a Roman Catholic. His father was described as an "eminent Royalist". According to his own account, he left Ireland for France in 1662 to learn the language, returning home through England in 1665. Three years later he went to Prague with the intention of entering the service of the Emperor Leopold I in his operations against Hungary. Finding that the expedition had been abandoned, he wandered through Flanders to England again. He next obtained a captain's commission in one of the companies raised by Sir George Hamilton in Ireland for Louis XIV; but on being discharged from his command soon after landing in France, he went to Paris.

Returning to England in October 1672, he received, in the following February, the lieutenancy of Captain Sydenham's company in the Duke of Albemarle's regiment, which he was forced to resign on the passing of the Test Act in 1673. For the next eight years, he intrigued with influential Catholics, including the Duchess of Portsmouth.

In February 1681, he wrote a libel in which he advocated the deposition of King Charles II and the exclusion of James, Duke of York. His motives remain a mystery, particularly as his father, who was still alive, was noted for his loyalty to the Stuart dynasty. He possibly intended to place this in the house of some prominent Whig, and then, by discovering it himself, earn a reward as an informer. He was betrayed by an accomplice, Edmond Everard, and sent first to Newgate Prison, and afterwards to the Tower of London.

== Trial and execution ==
At this point, he claimed he could reveal the secret of Sir Edmund Berry Godfrey's murder. Eventually, he succeeded in implicating the Earl of Danby. Fitzharris was impeached by the House of Commons for high treason, as a tactic, and his impeachment brought into discussion an important question of constitutional law. The House of Lords having voted for a trial at common law, the Commons declared this to be a denial of justice. Parliament, however, was suddenly dissolved after eight days' session on 28 March. Some at the time thought that the court feared that Fitzharris might be driven by the impeachment to awkward disclosures: he had had, in fact, more than one interview with the king through the intercession of the Duchess of Portsmouth.

The dissolution meant that Fitzharris was tried before the King's Bench in Easter term, and entered a plea against the jurisdiction of the court on the ground that proceedings were pending against him before the Lords. This plea was ruled to be insufficient, and Fitzharris was proceeded against at common law, 9 June 1681, and convicted. Francis Hawkins, chaplain of the Tower, then took him in hand in the interests of the court, and, by insinuating that his life might yet be spared, persuaded him to draw up a pretended confession implicating whig leaders, in which William Howard, 3rd Baron Howard of Escrick, who had befriended Fitzharris, was made the author of the libel, while Sir Robert Clayton and Sir George Treby, before whom his preliminary examination had been conducted, together with the sheriffs, Slingsby Bethel and Henry Cornish, were charged with subornation. Gilbert Burnet, who interviewed Fitzharris, reported later that he knew well he was being led on with false hopes. His wife, a daughter of Commander William Finch, made heroic efforts to secure a reprieve, but to no avail. Fitzharris was executed on 1 July 1681 (ironically at the same time as Oliver Plunkett, the last victim of the Plot), the concocted confession appeared the very next day, and Hawkins was rewarded with the deanery of Chichester. The justices and sheriffs in their reply, Truth Vindicated, claimed the so-called confession was a tissue of falsehoods. The indictment against Lord Howard of Escrick was withdrawn since the grand jury refused to believe the witnesses, who included Fitzharris' widow.

In 1689, Sir John Hawles, Solicitor General for England and Wales to William III, published some Remarks on Fitzharris's trial, which he condemned as illegal. During the same year, the Commons recommended Mrs. Fitzharris and her three children to the bountiful consideration of the king.
