= Painted glass =

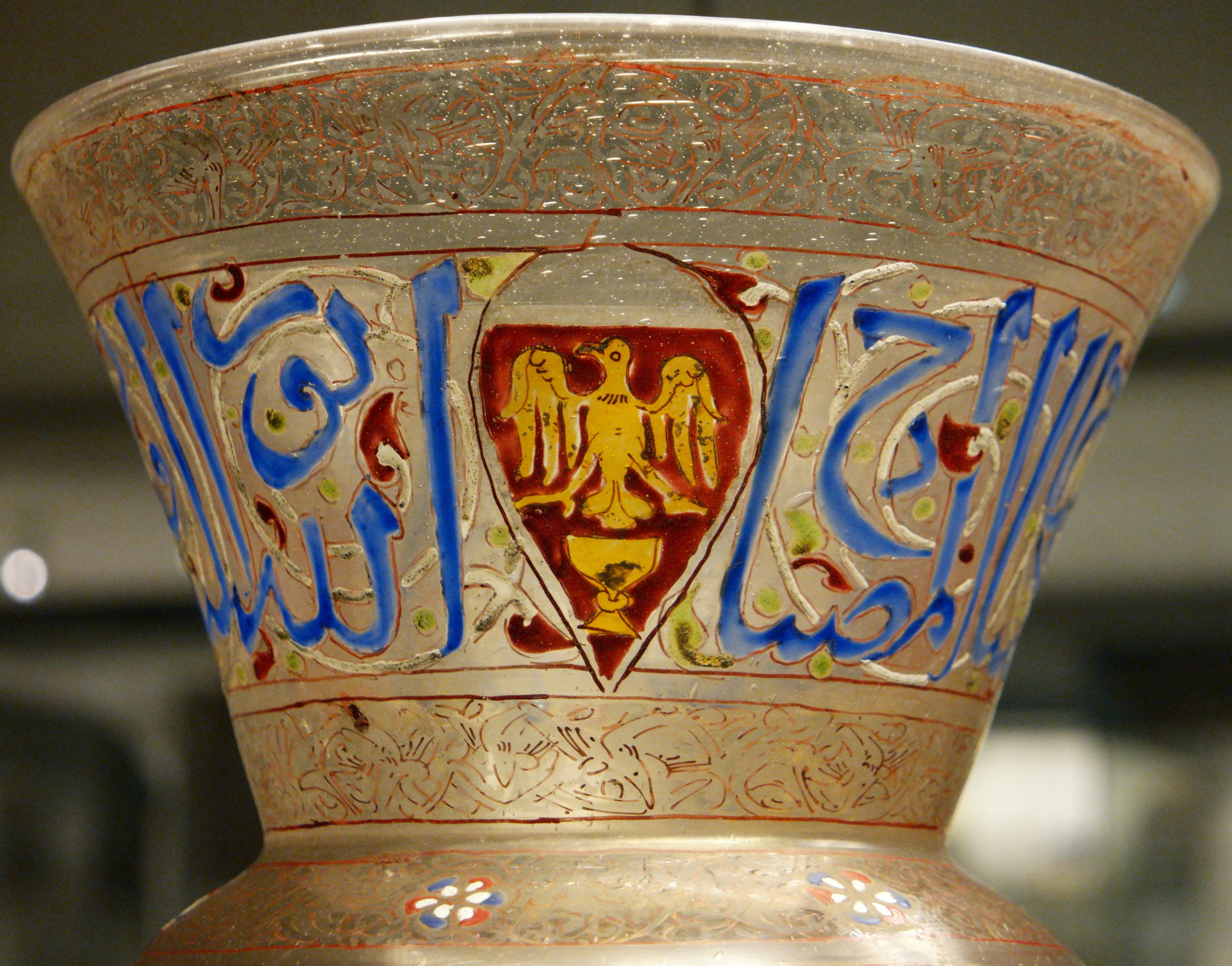
"Painted" enamelled glass, Egyptian mosque lamp, 14th century

Painted glass refers to two different techniques of decorating glass, both more precisely known by other terms. Firstly, and more correctly, it means enamelled glass, normally relatively small vessels which have been painted with preparations of vitreous enamel, and then fixed by a light firing to melt them and fuse them to the glass surface.

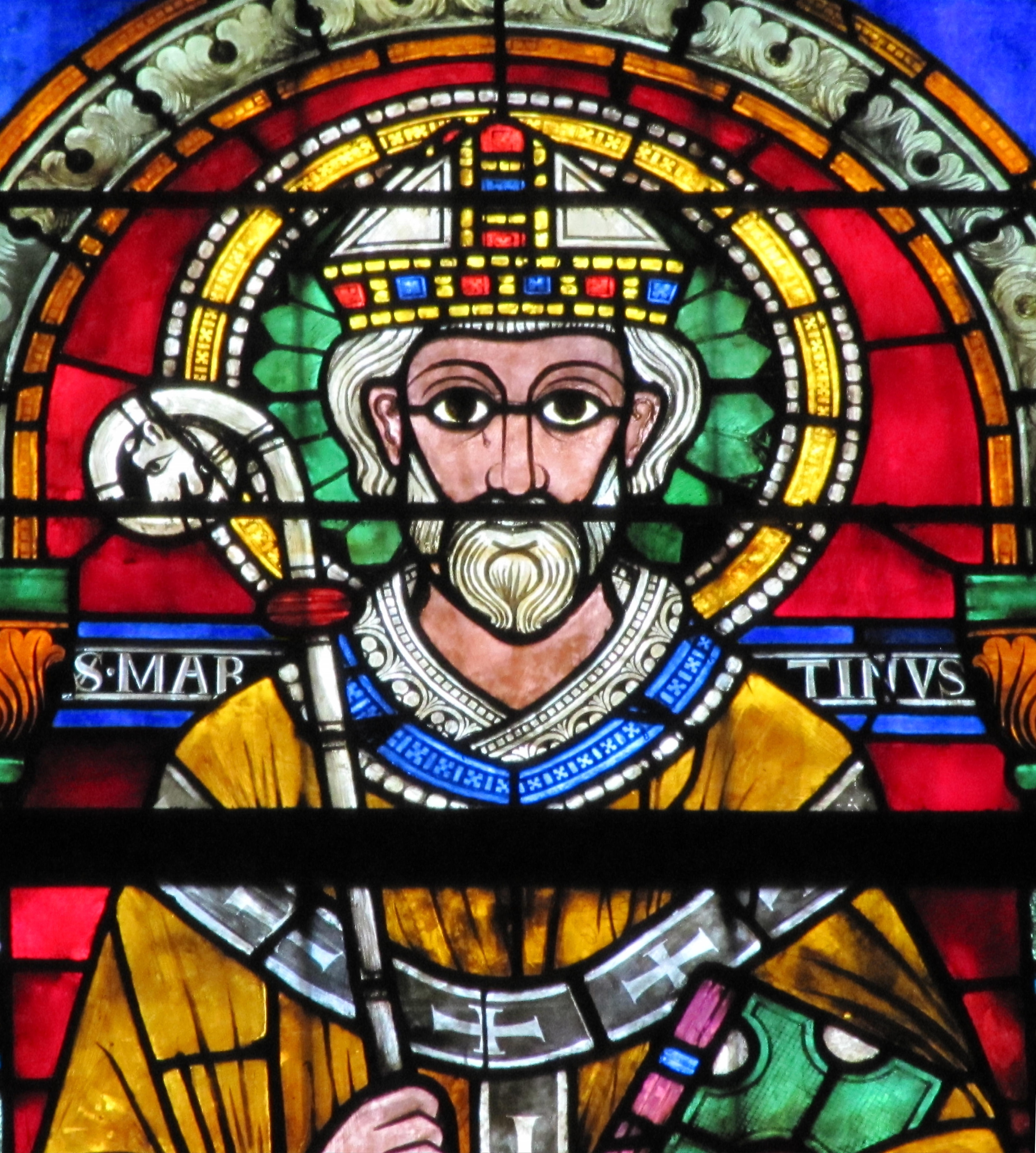
Detail of 12th-century stained glass window in Strasbourg Cathedral; black and white paint has been used on the coloured glass.

Secondly it refers to stained glass, used for windows. Here the design is made up using sheets of coloured glass, cut to shape and held in place by lead. The painting is the final stage, typically only in black. The paint is usually not fused to the flat glass by firing, but if it is, it is still called "stained glass".

Glass painting or glass painter might refer to either technique, but more usually enamelled glass. It may also refer to the cinematic technique of matte painting, which is a type of painted representation of landscape. There is benefits to glass painting, it adds depth and texture, reflects light, easy to clean and maintain, and it creates a focal point. Providing a look of a fairy-tale and when sunlight shines through, it amplifies its beauty.

== Glass painting in folk art ==
Glass painting is also used to describe painting on glass surfaces with special paints, transparent or opaque, that may be used without heating the piece after.

Sign painting is often made on shop, restaurant and pub windows, usually as reverse glass painting. This may also involve gilding by attaching gold leaf to certain areas of the glass.
