= Ralph Thoresby =

British historian (1658–1725)

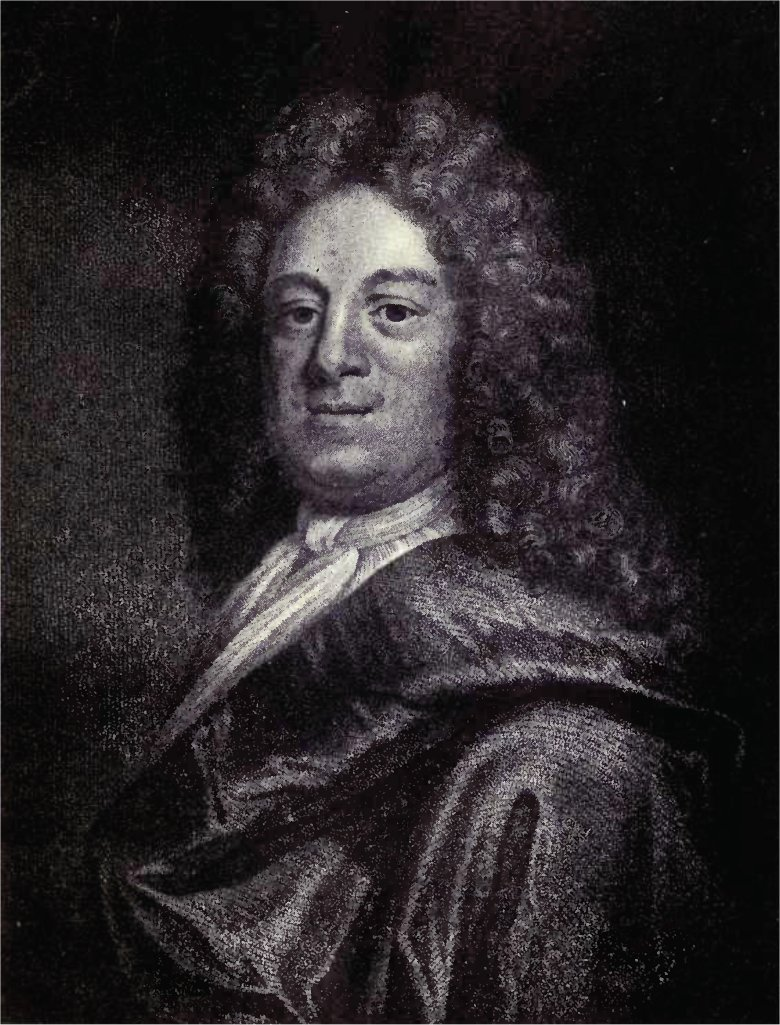
Ralph Thoresby

Ralph Thoresby (16 August 1658 – 16 October 1725) was an antiquarian, who was born in Leeds and is widely credited with being the first historian of that city. Besides being a merchant, he was a nonconformist, fellow of the Royal Society, diarist, author, common-councilman in the Corporation of Leeds, and museum keeper.

== Early life ==
Ralph Thoresby was the son of John Thoresby, a Leeds merchant who for a time was an officer under Fairfax during the English Civil War, and was by inclination an antiquarian; and of his wife Ruth (b. Ruth Idle, from Bulmer, near York).

According to the preface of The Diary of Ralph Thoresby F.R.S., father and son were alike, deeply religious and both with strong attachments to antiquarian pursuits. John Thoresby established for himself a museum of coins and medals, purchasing at great expense two pre-existing collections owned by the Fairfax family and another family called Stonehouse.

Ralph was educated at Leeds Grammar School, and on the death of his older brother became the eldest son of the family. He was sent at the age of eighteen to the house of a relation in London, as part of his grooming as a merchant. He maintained a diary from this point, fairly consistently, throughout the rest of his life; an edited version was published in 1830.

From July 1678 to February 1679, he resided in Holland, to complete his mercantile training. From March 1679 until the end of his life he lived in Leeds.

He inherited his father's business and museum upon the former's death on 31 October 1679, and provided for his younger brother and sister.

In 1683, he was prosecuted as a nonconformist. Evidently this was not a great setback since in 1684 he "took his freedom" of (joined) the Eastland and Hamburgh Companies, two of the five regulated companies for foreign commerce (the others being the Muscovy, Levant and African Companies).

On 25 February 1685 he married Anna Sykes, daughter of Richard Sykes, one of the lords of the manor of Leeds.

In 1689 he established a mill for the preparation of rapeseed oil at Sheepscar; in which, as well as in his other mercantile concerns, he had little, or rather no, success.

== Antiquarian activities ==
In 1690 Thoresby made the acquaintance of William Nicolson, an eminent antiquarian scholar and later Bishop of Carlisle, and from this point turned his mind towards the production of a history of Leeds and environs. Throughout the last decade of the century, his fame as an antiquarian slowly rose, as did the public attention paid to his museum – an object of curiosity to strangers visiting the city. As a result of his studies of Roman remains, he was elected Fellow of the Royal Society in 1697; some of his communications appear in their transactions. In the same year he was elected an Assistant, or Common-Councilman, in the Corporation of Leeds. He abandoned his connections with the dissenters in 1699.

He appears to have retired altogether from business in 1704, with a small income, and devoted himself to this museum, literary pursuits, and his religious observances.

In 1715, he published his Topographical Survey of the Parish of Leeds, to which he annexed a descriptive catalogue of the curiosities of his museum.

It was asserted on page 90 in the 1927 book 'The Witching Weed', (Second Edition), George G. Harrap and Co., that from at least 1719, Thoresby " Carefully preserved in [his] museum..." Sir Walter Raleigh's tobacco box. That it was "Seven inches in diameter and thirteen inches high".

== Death ==
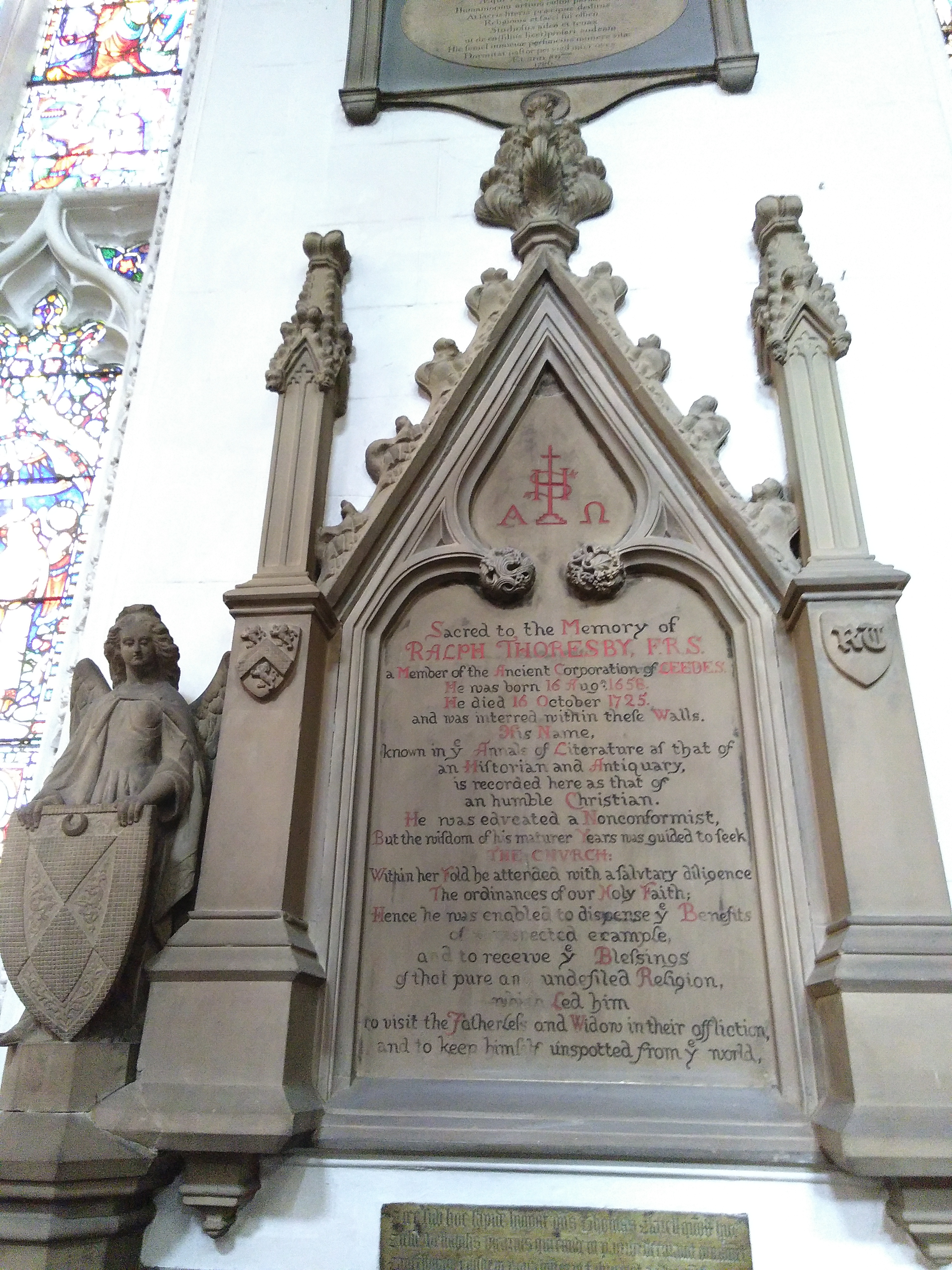
Monument to Ralph Thoresby, on south wall of the sanctuary of Leeds Minster

In October 1724 he suffered a paralytic stroke, from which he recovered so far as to be able to speak intelligibly and walk without help. He lingered in a melancholy state until October 1725, when he was carried off by a second stroke. He was buried in the choir of the (old) Leeds Parish Church. He left a wife, two sons and a daughter, the survivors of his ten children. Both sons were clergymen, who gained preferments to Edmund Gibson, Bishop of Lincoln and later of London.

== Legacy ==
Thoresby's museum did not survive his death. It was gradually dismembered until the remains were sold off at auction in March 1764. His collection of letters from celebrated men found its way into the British Museum, as did some of his bibliographic collection. However much of his correspondence and of his diary have suffered an uncertain fate and are feared irrevocably lost. What could be collected of both was published in edited form by Joseph Hunter, in two volumes in 1830. The Monthly Review for April 1830 was scathing about the publication:

If the friends of sound and useful literature, and the enemies of these piles of trash, which, under the titles of 'Diaries' and 'Memoirs', have been for some years accumulating on the booksellers' shelves, were to pray for the publication of some work which would make manifest, even to the most stupid reader, the utter worthlessness of most of the volumes of this description which have recently escaped from the hands of the printer,—they could not have desired any occurrence more opportune for their purpose than the appearance of 'Ralph Thoresby's Diary'. It exceeds both in quantity and quality of foolishness, any book of a similar description which has seen the light since the days of old Angelo, the fencing master. At best, when we meet with an intelligible page or two, the silly trifles which they record, and the inconsiderable person who records them, combine, again and again, to force upon us this question,— for what end were so much paper, so much ink, so much steam wasted? What do we gain by reading on and on, wandering over a waste which is as desolate and as barren as the most sandy of the sandy wilds of Asia?

Such considerations appear not to have troubled Daniel Hopkin Atkinson, who in 1887 published Ralph Thoresby, the Topographer: his town and times – "a useful and entertaining commentary on Thoresby's Diary and Correspondence".

Ralph Thoresby High School in Leeds is named after him; as was one of the houses of the former Leeds Grammar School. When the local historical society was launched on 10 July 1889, it was named the Thoresby Society to honour "one of the greatest worthies Leeds had known". A masonic lodge in Pudsey is also named after him.

== Publications ==
- Ducatus Leodiensis; or the Topography of the antient and populous Town and Parish of Leedes and parts adjacent in the West Riding of the County of York, 1715. A second edition was published by Thomas Dunham Whitaker in 1816.
- Museum Thoresbyanum, or A Catalogue of his Museum, with the Curiosities Natural and Artificial, and the Antiquities; particularly the Roman, British, Saxon, Danish, Norman and Scotch coins, with Modern Medals, 1715
- Vicaria Leodiensis: or the History of the Church of Leedes in Yorkshire, 1724
