= 1270s in England =

Events from the 1270s in England.

== Incumbents ==
- Monarch – Henry III (to 16 November 1272), Edward I

== Events ==
- 1270
  - April – Parliament levies a property tax to support a Crusade.
  - 20 August – The Lord Edward, heir to the throne, sets out from Dover to join the Eighth Crusade in what becomes known as Lord Edward's crusade (sometimes the Ninth Crusade); he is accompanied throughout by his wife Eleanor of Castile.
  - 9 September – William Chillenden is elected to the Archbishopric of Canterbury.
  - 10 November – The Lord Edward arrives in Tunis a fortnight after the Treaty of Tunis has ended fighting in the Eighth Crusade. He eventually decides to continue to the Kingdom of Jerusalem.
  - Edmund, Earl of Cornwall, donates to the Cistercian Hailes Abbey near Winchcombe in Gloucestershire (his father's foundation) a phial held to contain the Blood of Christ, acquired in the Holy Roman Empire; this becomes such a magnet for pilgrimage that within 7 years the monks are able to rebuild their abbey on a magnificent scale.
  - Battle of Áth an Chip: The army of the Irish Kingdom of Connacht routs the English army near Carrick-on-Shannon.
- 1271
  - 9 May – Lord Edward's crusade: The Lord Edward arrives in Acre, causing the Mamluk sultan Baibars to withdraw his siege of the city.
- 1272
  - 12 May – Lord Edward's crusade is concluded by the Treaty of Caesarea.
  - 16 June – an attempt is made on the life of The Lord Edward at Acre; he kills the would-be assassin but receives a festering wound from a poisoned dagger.
  - Summer – Pope Gregory X sets aside the election of William Chilldenden to the Archbishopric of Canterbury.
  - 24 September – The Lord Edward leaves Acre for Sicily.
  - 11 October – Robert Kilwardby is enthroned as Archbishop of Canterbury.
  - 16 November – King Henry III dies at the Palace of Westminster after a 56-year reign; his son The Lord Edward (at this time in Sicily) succeeds him as Edward I of England and is proclaimed king.
  - Court of Common Pleas established as a permanent body, and receives its first chief justice (Gilbert of Preston).
  - Worshipful Company of Cordwainers and Curriers granted rights to regulate the leather trade in the City of London; Fishmongers Company chartered.
- 1273
  - Edward, making a protracted return from Sicily, visits Pope Gregory X and pays homage to Philip III of France.
- 1274
  - 2 August – Edward I returns to England from his crusade.
  - 19 August – coronation of Edward I at Westminster Abbey.
  - August – Merton College, Oxford, receives its statutes, the first English university college to do so.
  - The Hundred Rolls are commissioned, enquiring into the rights of English landowners.
- 1275
  - 22 April – Edward I's first parliament meets and passes the first Statute of Westminster, codifying the existing law in England, in 51 chapters of Norman French, and defining legal privileges.
  - May – Parliament imposes the first regular customs duty on wool and leather.
  - 11 September – an earthquake in southern England damages churches at Glastonbury and is felt across the country.
  - Llywelyn ap Gruffudd refuses to pay homage to Edward I; Llywelyn's proxy bride Eleanor de Montfort (Edward's cousin) is captured at sea off the south-west of England and held prisoner at Windsor Castle as a bargaining counter for Llywelyn's compliance.
  - Statute of the Jewry forbids Jews from charging interest on loans.
- 1276
  - November – Edward I invades Wales.
  - Merton College, Oxford, is first recorded as having a collection of books, making its Library the world's oldest in continuous daily use.
- 1277
  - 9 November – Treaty of Aberconwy by which Llywelyn is to retain control only of the western part of Gwynedd (although retaining the title of Prince of Wales) in return for paying homage to England; the remainder of Gwynedd is split between Edward and Dafydd ap Gruffydd (Llywelyn's brother, who has remained loyal to Edward).
  - Saint George's Cross is first recorded in use as the national flag of England.
- 1278
  - June or July – Robert Burnell is elected to the Archbishopric of Canterbury.
  - 7 August – Statute of Gloucester defines competences of local courts and establishes legal procedures for claiming a right to privileges.
  - 13 October – the King allows his cousin Eleanor de Montfort to marry Llywelyn ap Gruffudd at Worcester Cathedral.
  - 17 November – all Jews in England are imprisoned on suspicion of coin clipping.
- 1279
  - January – Pope Nicholas III quashes the election of Robert Burnell to the Archbishopric of Canterbury.
  - 25 January – John Peckham is enthroned as Archbishop of Canterbury against the wishes of the King.
  - 15 November – the first of the Statutes of Mortmain prevents land from passing into possession of the church.
  - December – new silver coinage issued, including the first groats and round farthings and a new halfpenny. The cutting of pennies into halves and quarters is prohibited but the practice continues for many years. The Royal Mint has moved to the Tower of London by this time.
  - Itinerant royal judges are ordered to inquire into confederacies against justice, thus effectively making conspiracy a crime.
  - Further round of Hundred Rolls commissioned.

== Births ==
- 1270
  - Approximate date – Andrew Harclay, 1st Earl of Carlisle, military leader (executed 1323)
- 1272
  - 31 January – William Ferrers, 1st Baron Ferrers of Groby (died 1235)
  - April – Joan of Acre, daughter of King Edward I (died 1307)
  - Approximate date – Guy de Beauchamp, 10th Earl of Warwick (died 1315)
- 1273
  - 24 November – Alphonso, Earl of Chester, son of Edward I (died 1284)
- 1274
  - Approximate date – Adam Murimuth, ecclesiastic and chronicler (died 1347)
- 1275
  - 15 March – Margaret of England, Duchess of Brabant, daughter of King Edward I (died after 1333)
  - 18 August – Bartholomew de Badlesmere, 1st Baron Badlesmere (died 1322)
  - Approximate date – Aymer de Valence, 2nd Earl of Pembroke (died 1324)
- 1276
  - Humphrey de Bohun, 4th Earl of Hereford (died in battle 1322)
- 1278
  - 11 March – Mary of Woodstock, daughter of King Edward I, nun (died by 1332)
  - 8 September – Theobald de Verdun, 2nd Baron Verdun, landowner in Ireland (died 1316)
  - Approximate date – Thomas, 2nd Earl of Lancaster, politician (executed 1322)
- 1279
  - Antony Bek, Bishop of Norwich (died 1343)
  - Approximate date – Marguerite of France, daughter of Philip III of France and Queen consort of Edward I of England (died 1318)

== Deaths ==
- 1270
  - 18 July – Boniface of Savoy, Archbishop of Canterbury, (born c. 1217)
  - Roger Bigod, 4th Earl of Norfolk (born 1212)
- 1271
  - 13 March – Henry of Almain, crusader (born 1235)
  - Richard de Grey, Lord Warden of the Cinque Ports (year of birth unknown)
- 1272
  - 18 March – John FitzAlan, 7th Earl of Arundel (born 1246)
  - 2 April – Richard, 1st Earl of Cornwall (born 1209)
  - c. June – James Audley, high sheriff (born 1220)
  - 7 August – Richard Middleton, Lord Chancellor
  - 18 September – Peter III de Brus, nobleman
  - 16 November – King Henry III (born 1207)
  - Bartholomeus Anglicus, Franciscan friar and encyclopedia author (born before 1203)
  - Approximate date – William of Sherwood, logician (born c. 1200)
- 1275
  - 26 February – Margaret of England, daughter of Henry III of England and consort of Alexander III of Scotland (born 1240)
  - 13 April – Eleanor of England (born 1215)
  - 24 September – Humphrey de Bohun, 2nd Earl of Hereford, Constable of England (born 1208)
  - John of Howden, canon and poet writing in Norman French and Latin
- 1277
  - 17 October – Beatrice of Falkenburg, widow of Richard of Cornwall (born c. 1254)
  - 27 October – Walter de Merton, Lord Chancellor and founder of Merton College, Oxford (born c. 1205)
  - Licoricia of Winchester, Jewish businesswoman, murdered
- 1278
  - 22 January – Roger Skerning, Bishop of Norwich
  - September or October – Robert de Chauncy, Bishop of Carlisle
- 1279
  - late April – Walter Giffard, Lord Chancellor and Archbishop of York (born c. 1225)
  - 15 July – William Langton (of Rotherfield), archdeacon
  - 11 September – Robert Kilwardby, Archbishop of Canterbury (born c. 1215)
  - 18 December – Richard of Gravesend, Bishop of Lincoln
