= 1308 in Scotland =

- Centuries: 12th; 13th; 14th; 15th; 16th
- Decades: 1280s; 1290s; 1300s; 1310s; 1320s
- See also: List of years in Scotland; Timeline of Scottish history 1308 in: England • Elsewhere

Events from the year 1308 in the Kingdom of Scotland.

== Incumbents ==
- Monarch – Robert I

== Events ==
- 23 May – Battle of Inverurie
- after 23 May – Harrying of Buchan
- 29 June – Battle of the River Dee
- June–August – siege, capture and destruction of Aberdeen Castle by Scottish forces
- August – King Robert defeats McDougall of Lorne at The Battle of the Pass of Brander
- 25 December – Forfar Castle recaptured by Scottish forces

unknown date

- Last meeting of the Scottish Parliament to be held in Gaelic takes place at Taynuilt

== Deaths ==
- 10 October – Patrick IV, Earl of March (born 1242)
- 8 November – Duns Scotus, one of the most important philosopher-theologians of the High Middle Ages (born c. 1266)

date unknown

- Gilbert de Umfraville, Earl of Angus

== See also ==
- Timeline of Scottish history
