= 1307 in Scotland =

- Centuries: 12th; 13th; 14th; 15th; 16th
- Decades: 1280s; 1290s; 1300s; 1310s; 1320s
- See also: List of years in Scotland; Timeline of Scottish history 1307 in: England • Elsewhere

Events from the year 1307 in the Kingdom of Scotland.

== Incumbents ==
- Monarch – Robert I

== Events ==
- February – Battle of Turnberry
- 9/10 February – Battle of Loch Ryan
- March – Battle of Glen Trool
- 10 May – Battle of Loudoun Hill
- December – Battle of Slioch

== Deaths ==
- 9 February:
  - Alexander de Brus younger brother of Robert the Bruce, captured at Battle of Loch Ryan and later executed (born c.1285)
  - Thomas de Brus, younger brother of Robert the Bruce, captured at Battle of Loch Ryan and later executed (born c.1284)

Undated

- William de Moravia, 2nd Earl of Sutherland (born c. 1235)

== See also ==
- Timeline of Scottish history
