= 1311 in Scotland =

- Centuries: 12th; 13th; 14th; 15th; 16th
- Decades: 1290s; 1300s; 1310s; 1320s; 1330s
- See also: List of years in Scotland; Timeline of Scottish history 1311 in: England • Elsewhere

Events from the year 1311 in the Kingdom of Scotland.

== Incumbents ==
- Monarch – Robert I

== Events ==
- August – King Robert the Bruce retaliates for Edward II's invasion the previous year by invading northern England.

== Deaths ==
unknown date

- Baldred Bisset, lawyer who helped prepare the Scottish case for sovereignty in the face of English claims and aggression (born 1260)

== See also ==
- Timeline of Scottish history
