= 1270s in Scotland =

Events from the 1270s in the Kingdom of Scotland.

== Monarchs ==
- Alexander III, 1249–1286

== Births ==
- 11 July 1274 – Robert the Bruce (died 1329)

Full date unknown

- c. 1270 – William Wallace (died 1305 in England)
- c. 1272 – Isabel Bruce (died 1358 in Norway)
- c. 1274 – John Comyn III of Badenoch (died 1306)
- c. 1275 – John de Menteith (died c. 1329)
- c. 1276 – Maurice de Moravia, Earl of Strathearn (died 1346)
- c. 1278 – Christina Bruce (died c. 1356)

== Deaths ==
- 26 February 1275 – Margaret of England, Queen of Scots (born 1240 in England)
- 28 May 1279 – William Wishart

Full date unknown

- c. 1271 – Colban, Earl of Fife
- c. 1272 – David de Graham
- 1274 – William I, Earl of Ross
- c. 1274/1277 – John Comyn I of Badenoch (born c. 1215)
- c. 1278 – Walter de Moray

== See also ==
- List of years in Scotland
- Timeline of Scottish history
