= 1310 in Scotland =

- Centuries: 12th; 13th; 14th; 15th; 16th
- Decades: 1290s; 1300s; 1310s; 1320s; 1330s
- See also: List of years in Scotland; Timeline of Scottish history 1310 in: England • Elsewhere

Events from the year 1310 in the Kingdom of Scotland.

== Incumbents ==
- Monarch – Robert I

== Events ==
- 24 February – twelve Scottish bishops swear fealty to King Robert the Bruce
- August – King Edward II invades Scotland for the first time

unknown date –

- Robert the Bruce sends a letter to King Edward II seeking peace but asserting his God-given authority as king of the Scots and addressing Edward as his equal

== Deaths ==
unknown date

- John de Soules, one of the Guardians of Scotland

== See also ==
- Timeline of Scottish history
