= 1305 in Scotland =

- Centuries: 12th; 13th; 14th; 15th; 16th
- Decades: 1280s; 1290s; 1300s; 1310s; 1320s
- See also: List of years in Scotland; Timeline of Scottish history 1305 in: England • Elsewhere

Events from the year 1305 in the Kingdom of Scotland.

== Incumbent ==
- Monarch: Vacant

== Events ==
- May – a parliament meets in Perth to elect the Scottish delegation to the Westminster parliament.
- 5 August – John de Menteith, a Scottish knight loyal to King Edward of England, captures William Wallace and turns him over to English soldiers at Robroyston.
- September – parliament meets and spends 20 days drafting an ordinance for Scottish administration. John of Brittany is appointed to serve as Guardian, assisted by a council of 22 Scottish aristocrats.
- Approximate date – Scottish physician Bernard Gordon writes his short treatise Lilium medicinae which will become the first known book by a Scot to be printed (c. 1480 in Paris).

== Deaths ==
- 23 August – William Wallace, landowner and leader of Scottish resistance. Executed in London.

== See also ==
- Timeline of Scottish history
