= 1322 in Scotland =

- Centuries: 12th; 13th; 14th; 15th; 16th
- Decades: 1300s; 1310s; 1320s; 1330s; 1340s
- See also: List of years in Scotland; Timeline of Scottish history 1322 in: England • Elsewhere

Events from the year 1322 in the Kingdom of Scotland.

== Incumbents ==
- Monarch – Robert I

== Events ==
- 3 August – Death of Yolande of Dreux, Queen of Scotland.
- 14 October – Victory for Scots at the Battle of Old Byland in Yorkshire.

== See also ==
- Timeline of Scottish history
