= 1315 in Scotland =

- Centuries: 12th; 13th; 14th; 15th; 16th
- Decades: 1290s; 1300s; 1310s; 1320s; 1330s
- See also: List of years in Scotland; Timeline of Scottish history 1315 in: England • Elsewhere

Events from the year 1315 in the Kingdom of Scotland.

== Incumbents ==
- Monarch – Robert I

== Events ==
- 26 April – Scottish Parliament, meeting at Ayr, proclaims Edward as legal heir to King Robert as King Robert had no legal heir at that point.
- 26 May – Edward and his fleet (and more than 5,000 men) land on the Irish coast at points at and between Olderfleet Castle at Larne to initiate an invasion of Ireland.

== See also ==
- Timeline of Scottish history
