= 1320 in Scotland =

- Centuries: 12th; 13th; 14th; 15th; 16th
- Decades: 1300s; 1310s; 1320s; 1330s; 1340s
- See also: List of years in Scotland; Timeline of Scottish history 1320 in: England • Elsewhere

Events from the year 1320 in the Kingdom of Scotland.

== Incumbents ==
- Monarch – Robert I

== Events ==
- 6 April – signing of Declaration of Arbroath

== Births ==
- John Barbour, poet (died 1395)

== See also ==
- Timeline of Scottish history
