= 1507 in Scotland =

- Centuries: 14th; 15th; 16th; 17th; 18th
- Decades: 1480s; 1490s; 1500s; 1510s; 1520s
- See also: List of years in Scotland; Timeline of Scottish history 1507 in: England • Elsewhere

Events from the year 1507 in the Kingdom of Scotland.

== Incumbents ==
- Monarch – James IV

== Events ==
- 7 April – Easter Day: James IV is invested with the Papal sword at Holyrood Abbey.
- June – The tournament of the Wild Knight and the Black Lady is held in Edinburgh.
- 15 September – Walter Chepman and Andrew Myllar are licensed to establish a printing press and granted a monopoly in printed books within Scotland.

== Births ==
- 21 February – James Stewart, Duke of Rothesay, son of James IV and Margaret Tudor, at Holyrood Palace.

== Deaths ==
- 14 January – William Hay, 3rd Earl of Erroll
- 5 February – John Fraser (bishop), first Dean of the Collegiate Church at Restalrig and Bishop of Ross.
- Andrew Halyburton, merchant, John Francis is appointed as his successor as Conservator of Scottish Privileges in Flanders.

== See also ==
- Timeline of Scottish history
