= 1513 in Scotland =

- Centuries: 14th; 15th; 16th; 17th; 18th
- Decades: 1490s; 1500s; 1510s; 1520s; 1530s
- See also: List of years in Scotland; Timeline of Scottish history 1513 in: England • Elsewhere

Events from the year 1513 in Scotland.

== Incumbents ==
- Monarch – James IV (until 9 September), then James V

== Events ==
- 9 September – Battle of Flodden in Northumberland: heavy defeat of the Scottish army by the English; King James IV and many nobles are killed in battle.
- 21 September – James V is crowned in the Chapel Royal at Stirling Castle.
- Kilberry castle is destroyed by an English pirate.

== Births ==
- unknown date – Archibald Douglas of Glenbervie, nobleman (died 1570)

== Deaths ==
- 9 September:
  - James IV of Scotland, monarch, killed at Battle of Flodden (born 1473)
  - George Douglas, Master of Angus, killed at Battle of Flodden (born 1469)
  - William Sinclair, 2nd Earl of Caithness, killed at Battle of Flodden (born 1459)

== See also ==
- Timeline of Scottish history
