= 1280s in Scotland =

Events from the 1280s in the Kingdom of Scotland.

== Monarchs ==
- Alexander III, 1249–1286
- Margaret, Maid of Norway, 1286–1290 (heir, uncrowned)

== Events ==
- 19 March 1286 – Alexander III dies after falling from his horse.
- 1290 – the Treaty of Birgham is signed by the Guardians of Scotland arranging a dynastic union by the marriage of Margaret, Maid of Norway and Edward II of England. Scotland and England were to continue to be ruled separately.

== Births ==
Full date unknown

- c. 1280 – Edward Bruce (died 1318 in Ireland)
- c. 1283 – Edward Balliol (died 1364 in England)
- c. 1284 – Thomas de Brus (died 1307)
- c. 1285 – Alexander de Brus (died 1307)
- c. 1285 – Patrick V, Earl of March (died c. 1369)

== Deaths ==
- 19 March 1286 – King Alexander III (born 1241)
- 24 August 1289 – Patrick III, Earl of Dunbar (born c. 1213)

Full date unknown

- c. 1282 – Alexander Stewart, 4th High Steward of Scotland

== See also ==
- List of years in Scotland
- Timeline of Scottish history
