= 1220s in Scotland =

Events from the 1220s in the Kingdom of Scotland.

== Monarch ==
- Alexander II, 1214–1249

== Events ==
- 21 June 1221 – the wedding of Alexander II of Scotland and Joan of England.
- 1224 – Elgin Cathedral is founded and dedicated in Moray.
- 1229 – Balmerino Abbey is established by Ermengarde de Beaumont and Alexander II of Scotland.

== Deaths ==
- 11 September 1222 – Adam of Melrose, abbot and bishop

Full date unknown

- c. 1221 – Ada, Countess of Atholl (died 1266)
- c. 1222 – Walter Olifard
- 1223 – Gille Brigte, Earl of Strathearn (born 1150)
- c. 1226 – William de Moravia of Petty

== See also ==
- List of years in Scotland
- Timeline of Scottish history
