= 1318 in Scotland =

- Centuries: 12th; 13th; 14th; 15th; 16th
- Decades: 1290s; 1300s; 1310s; 1320s; 1330s
- See also: List of years in Scotland; Timeline of Scottish history 1318 in: England • Elsewhere

Events from the year 1318 in the Kingdom of Scotland.

== Incumbents ==
- Monarch – Robert I

== Events ==
- April – Sir James Douglas, Lord of Douglas takes the town and castle of Berwick-upon-Tweed from the English, who had controlled the town since 1296.
- 14 October – Battle of Faughart results in defeat and death of Edward Bruce, brother of Robert the Bruce

== See also ==
- Timeline of Scottish history
