= 1316 in Scotland =

- Centuries: 12th; 13th; 14th; 15th; 16th
- Decades: 1290s; 1300s; 1310s; 1320s; 1330s
- See also: List of years in Scotland; Timeline of Scottish history 1316 in: England • Elsewhere

Events from the year 1316 in the Kingdom of Scotland.

== Incumbents ==
- Monarch – Robert I

== Events ==
- 26 January – Battle of Skerries
- February – Battle of Skaithmuir

== Births ==
- 2 March – Robert II of Scotland, future king of Scotland (died 1390)

== Deaths ==
- 2 March – Marjorie Bruce, daughter of Robert I (1296/7–1316)
- 26 November – Robert Wishart, Bishop of Glasgow (1271–1316)

== See also ==
- Timeline of Scottish history
