= 1328 in Scotland =

- Centuries: 12th; 13th; 14th; 15th; 16th
- Decades: 1300s; 1310s; 1320s; 1330s; 1340s
- See also: List of years in Scotland; Timeline of Scottish history 1328 in: England • Wales • Elsewhere

Events from the year 1328 in the Kingdom of Scotland.

== Incumbents ==
- Monarch – Robert I

== Events ==
- 17 March – King Robert the Bruce signs the Treaty of Edinburgh–Northampton that marks English acceptance of Scottish independence.
- 1 May – Treaty of Edinburgh–Northampton is ratified by the English parliament meeting in Northampton.
- 17 July – fulfilling one part of the Treaty of Edinburgh-Northampton, David II of Scotland, four-year-old son of King Robert, and Joan of the Tower, seven-year-old sister of Edward III, are married at Berwick.

== Births ==
- Archibald Douglas, 3rd Earl of Douglas ("Archibald the Grim", "Black Archibald"), magnate and warrior (d. 1400)

== See also ==
- Timeline of Scottish history
