= 1325 in Scotland =

- Centuries: 12th; 13th; 14th; 15th; 16th
- Decades: 1300s; 1310s; 1320s; 1330s; 1340s
- See also: List of years in Scotland; Timeline of Scottish history 1325 in: England • Elsewhere

Events from the year 1325 in the Kingdom of Scotland.

== Incumbents ==
- Monarch – Robert I

== Events ==
- 22 June – King Robert issues a commission to enquire into and report on the rights that had been granted by his predecessors to the citizens of Dundee after they had appealed to him to re-establish those rights.

== See also ==
- Timeline of Scottish history
