= 1323 in Scotland =

- Centuries: 12th; 13th; 14th; 15th; 16th
- Decades: 1300s; 1310s; 1320s; 1330s; 1340s
- See also: List of years in Scotland; Timeline of Scottish history 1323 in: England • Elsewhere

Events from the year 1323 in the Kingdom of Scotland.

== Incumbents ==
- Monarch – Robert I

== Events ==
- 3 January – Andrew Harclay, 1st Earl of Carlisle signs a peace treaty with Robert the Bruce.
- 3 March – Andrew Harclay executed for treason by Edward II of England.
- 30 May – Less than three months after Harclay's execution, King Edward II agrees to a thirteen-year truce with Scotland.

== See also ==
- Timeline of Scottish history
