= 1309 in Scotland =

- Centuries: 12th; 13th; 14th; 15th; 16th
- Decades: 1280s; 1290s; 1300s; 1310s; 1320s
- See also: List of years in Scotland; Timeline of Scottish history 1309 in: England • Elsewhere

Events from the year 1309 in the Kingdom of Scotland.

== Incumbents ==
- Monarch – Robert I

== Events ==
- 17 March – Robert the Bruce holds his first Parliament at St. Andrews

== Deaths ==
- 16 July – James Stewart, 5th High Steward of Scotland, Guardian of Scotland during the First Interregnum

== See also ==
- Timeline of Scottish history
