= 1319 in Scotland =

- Centuries: 12th; 13th; 14th; 15th; 16th
- Decades: 1290s; 1300s; 1310s; 1320s; 1330s
- See also: List of years in Scotland; Timeline of Scottish history 1319 in: England • Elsewhere

Events from the year 1319 in the Kingdom of Scotland.

== Incumbents ==
- Monarch – Robert I

== Events ==
- 20 September – Battle of Myton: major engagement in the First Scottish War of Independence, fought in Yorkshire results in victory for Scots.
- 29 December – two-year truce with England, agreed several days earlier, comes into effect

== See also ==
- Timeline of Scottish history
