= 1306 in Scotland =

- Centuries: 12th; 13th; 14th; 15th; 16th
- Decades: 1280s; 1290s; 1300s; 1310s; 1320s
- See also: List of years in Scotland; Timeline of Scottish history 1306 in: England • Elsewhere

Events from the year 1306 in the Kingdom of Scotland.

== Incumbents ==
- Monarch – Robert I (from 25 March)

== Events ==
- 10 February – Robert the Bruce murders John Comyn before the high altar of Greyfriars Church in Dumfries.
- 25 March – Robert the Bruce crowned King of the Scots.
- 19 June – Battle of Methven: The forces of the Earl of Pembroke defeat Bruce's Scottish rebels.
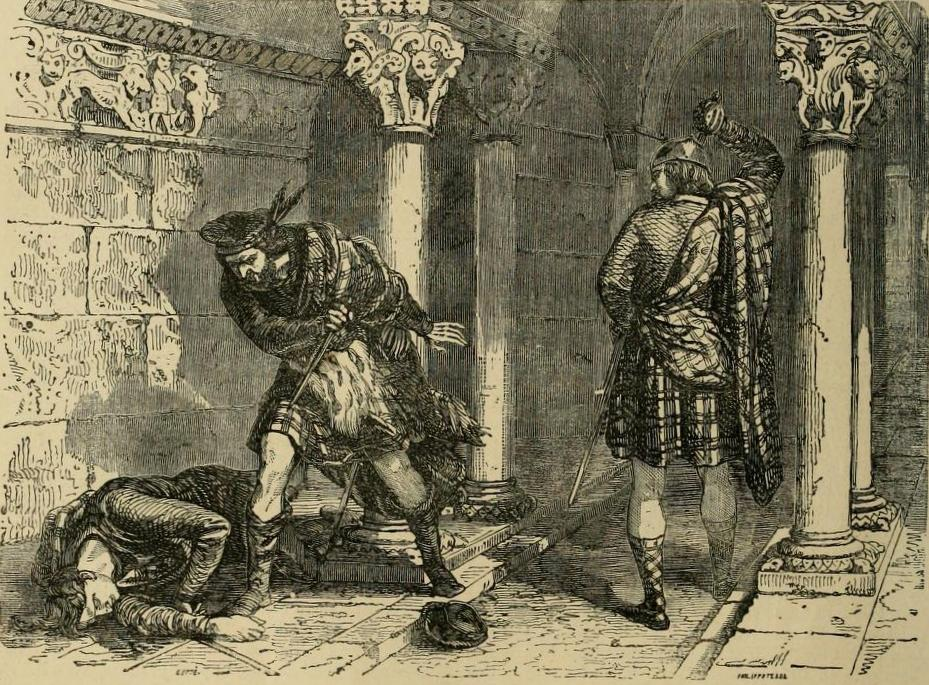
The killing of Comyn in the Greyfriars church in Dumfries, as imagined by Felix Philippoteaux, a 19th-century illustrator a highly inaccurate imagining as it shows them in kilts which were not worn by medieval Scots.

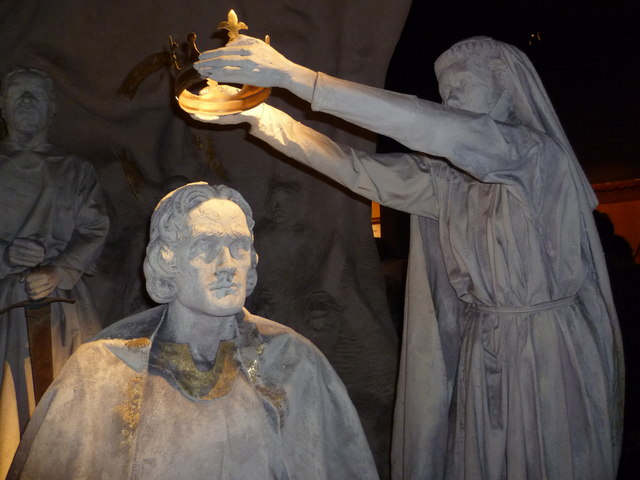
Isabella MacDuff, Countess of Buchan, crowning Robert the Bruce at Scone in 1306; from a modern tableau at Edinburgh Castle

== Births ==
unknown date

- John Randolph, 3rd Earl of Moray (died 1346)

== Deaths ==
- 10 February – John III Comyn, Lord of Badenoch, nobleman and Guardian of Scotland
- 4 August - David de Inchmartin, executed by English by being hanged in Newcastle upon Tyne
- 4 August - Alexander Scrymgeour, Scottish standard bearer, executed by English by being hanged in Newcastle upon Tyne
- 4 August - John de Seton, executed by English by being hanged, drawn and quartered in Newcastle upon Tyne
- September – Nigel de Brus, younger brother of Robert the Bruce, executed by English by being hanged, drawn and quartered in Berwick-upon-Tweed
- 8 September – Simon Fraser, knight, executed by English by being hanged, drawn and quartered in London
- 7 November – John of Strathbogie, Earl of Atholl, captured after Battle of Methven, executed by hanging in London
- 9 November - Thomas de Brus, younger brother of Robert the Bruce, executed by English by being hanged, drawn and beheaded at Carlisle, Cumberland, England
- unknown – Alexander de Brus, younger brother of Robert the Bruce, executed by English by being hanged, drawn and beheaded at Carlisle, Cumberland, England
- unknown - Christopher Seton, executed by English by being hanged, drawn and quartered at Dumfries

== See also ==
- Timeline of Scottish history
