= 1250s in Scotland =

Events from the 1250s in the Kingdom of Scotland.

== Monarch ==
- Alexander III, 1249–1286

== Events ==
- 26 December 1251 – Margaret of England and Alexander III of Scotland are married, as stipulated by the Treaty of Newcastle, signed in 1244.

== Deaths ==
- 19 March 1250 - Clement of Dunblane, bishop and Guardian of Scotland
- 13 June 1250 – Donnchadh, Earl of Carrick

Full date unknown

- 1250 – Maol Domhnaich, Earl of Lennox
- c. 1250 – Fearchar, Earl of Ross
- 1251 – Walter Byset, Lord of Aboyne
- c. 1256 – Gilbert, Earl of Orkney (born c. 1210)
- 1258 – Walter Comyn, Lord of Badenoch
- 1258 – William de Bondington

== See also ==
- List of years in Scotland
- Timeline of Scottish history
