= 1314 in Scotland =

- Centuries: 12th; 13th; 14th; 15th; 16th
- Decades: 1290s; 1300s; 1310s; 1320s; 1330s
- See also: List of years in Scotland; Timeline of Scottish history 1314 in: England • Elsewhere

Events from the year 1314 in the Kingdom of Scotland.

== Incumbents ==
- Monarch – Robert I

== Events ==
- 24 June – Battle of Bannockburn: English forces defeated by smaller army led by Robert the Bruce

== Deaths ==
- 24 June – John Comyn IV of Badenoch (born c. 1294)

Undated

- John Balliol, King of Scots from 1292 to 1296 (died in France, born 1249)

== See also ==
- Timeline of Scottish history
