= Wool church =

Type of church building in England

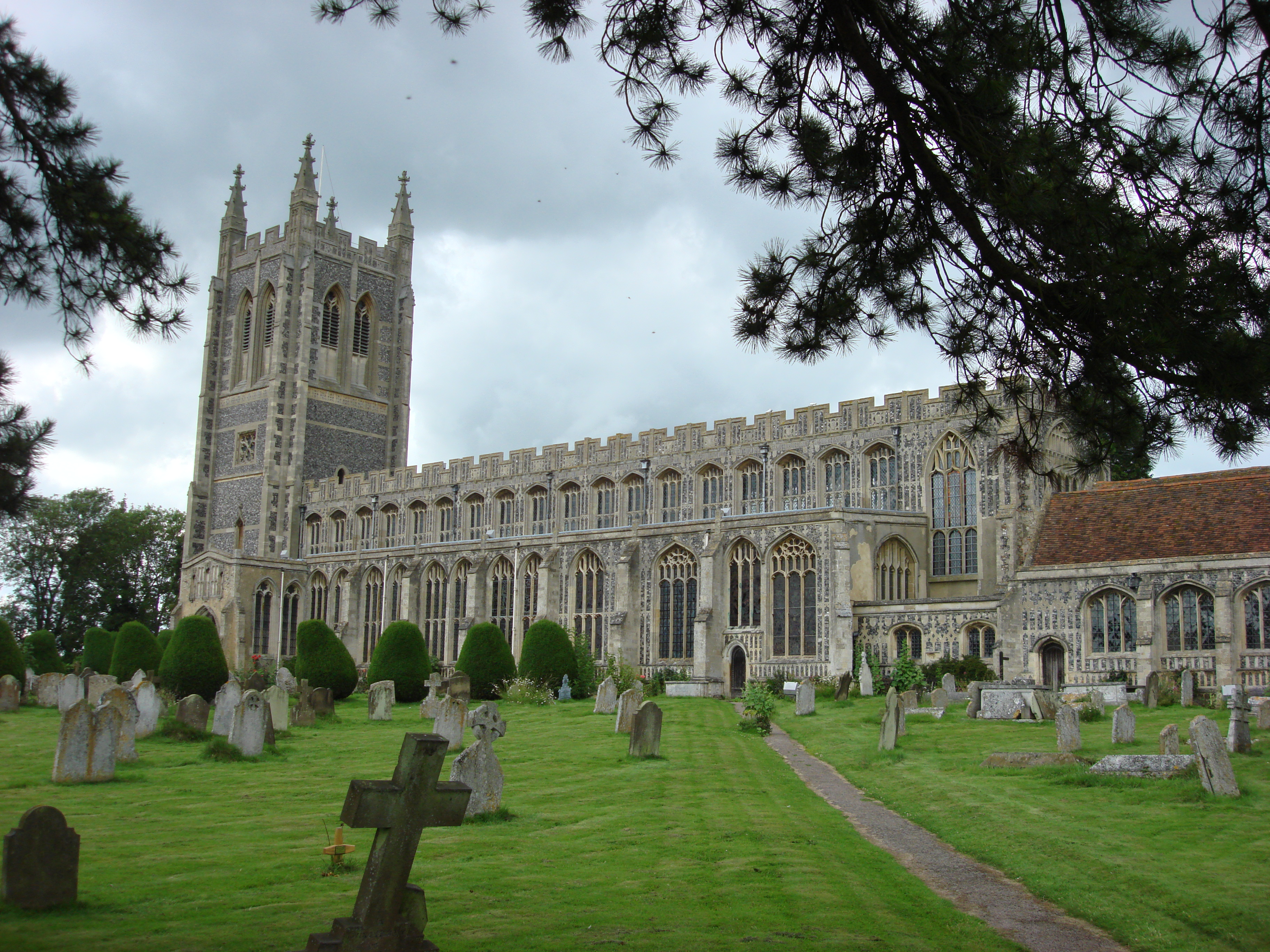
Holy Trinity Church, Long Melford, Suffolk, a classic wool church

A wool church is an English church financed primarily by donations from rich merchants and farmers who had benefitted from the medieval wool trade, hoping to ensure a place in heaven due to their largesse.

Wool churches are common in the Cotswolds and in the "wool towns" of upland East Anglia, where enormous profits from the wool business spurred construction of ever-grander edifices. A wool church was often built to replace a smaller or less imposing place of worship, in order to reflect the growing prosperity of the community in which it was situated. Many such building projects were undertaken by a small number of families in each village or town, who used the new church building to display their own wealth, status and faith. The building of wool churches largely ended with the English Reformation and the simultaneous decline of the wool trade between 1525 and 1600.

== Notable wool churches ==
=== Long Melford ===
The Holy Trinity Church, Long Melford, Suffolk, is widely regarded as one of the finest wool churches in East Anglia. Built largely from 1467–1497 with funding from local cloth merchants, primarily John Clopton, the structure contains magnificent stained glass from the fifteenth century, the Clopton family chantry chapel and the soaring Lady Chapel, which extends at Holy Trinity's east end. The Flushwork employed by the builders of Holy Trinity is some of the finest in England. The church stands as testimony to the wool business and its overwhelming success in medieval times.

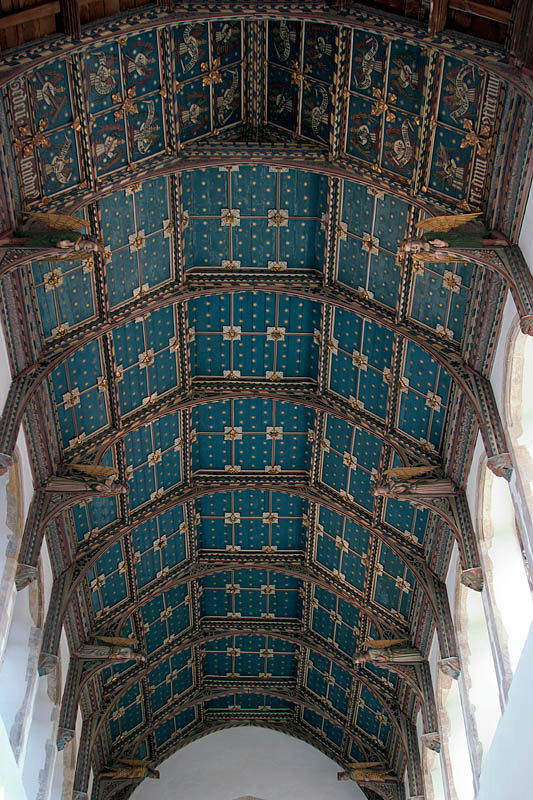
Roof of St. Edmund's Church, Southwold, Suffolk

=== Cirencester ===
The Church of St. John the Baptist, Cirencester is the parish church for Cirencester, Gloucestershire. Dubbed 'The Cathedral of the Cotswolds', it is built of Cotswold stone and is one of the "largest parish churches in England". It contains various tombs and monuments with some fragments of medieval stained glass and wall paintings. In 1508, major reconstruction took place funded by the wool trade making it an excellent example of a Wool church.

=== Southwold ===
Another grand Suffolk church is St. Edmunds, Southwold which retains medieval chancel screens.

=== Cawston ===
St. Agnes' Church at Cawston, Norfolk is also well known as a "wool church." Its fifteenth century nave and western tower were financed by Michael de la Pole, Earl of Suffolk, who had grown rich from the wool business. As is typical of a 'wool church,' St. Agnes's scale is far grander than was required by a modest medieval village. And the Earl of Suffolk spared no expense in embellishing the interior: the de la Pole crest is carved above the entrance; French stone was used for the tower and nave; the roof, although the typical wooden East Anglian style, is an elaborate hammerbeam confection with elaborate angels curving off the beam ends, and a trio of angels on outstretched wings hovering over each clerestory window.

Clearly in East Anglian medieval times, sheep furnished the currency for architectural atonement.

=== Worstead ===
At St. Mary's Church at Worstead, Norfolk, the village which gave its name to the cloth, the village church built by local weavers in the fourteenth-century towers over the small community, its tower jutting strikingly above the landscape. In other East Anglian communities, the wealth from wool poured in: Wymondham, Diss, North Walsham, East Harling, Attleborough, Aylsham. The churches basked in the refracted glory of wool wealth. Even in Norwich, which boasts more medieval churches than anywhere in Europe, it was wool money that got the stone lifted, the glass stained and the panels carved. Norfolk wool was best suited to heavier cloth, and so Norwich and Norfolk eventually gained almost a complete monopoly on worstead. Those profits fueled an extraordinary ecclesiastical building boom.

=== Lavenham ===
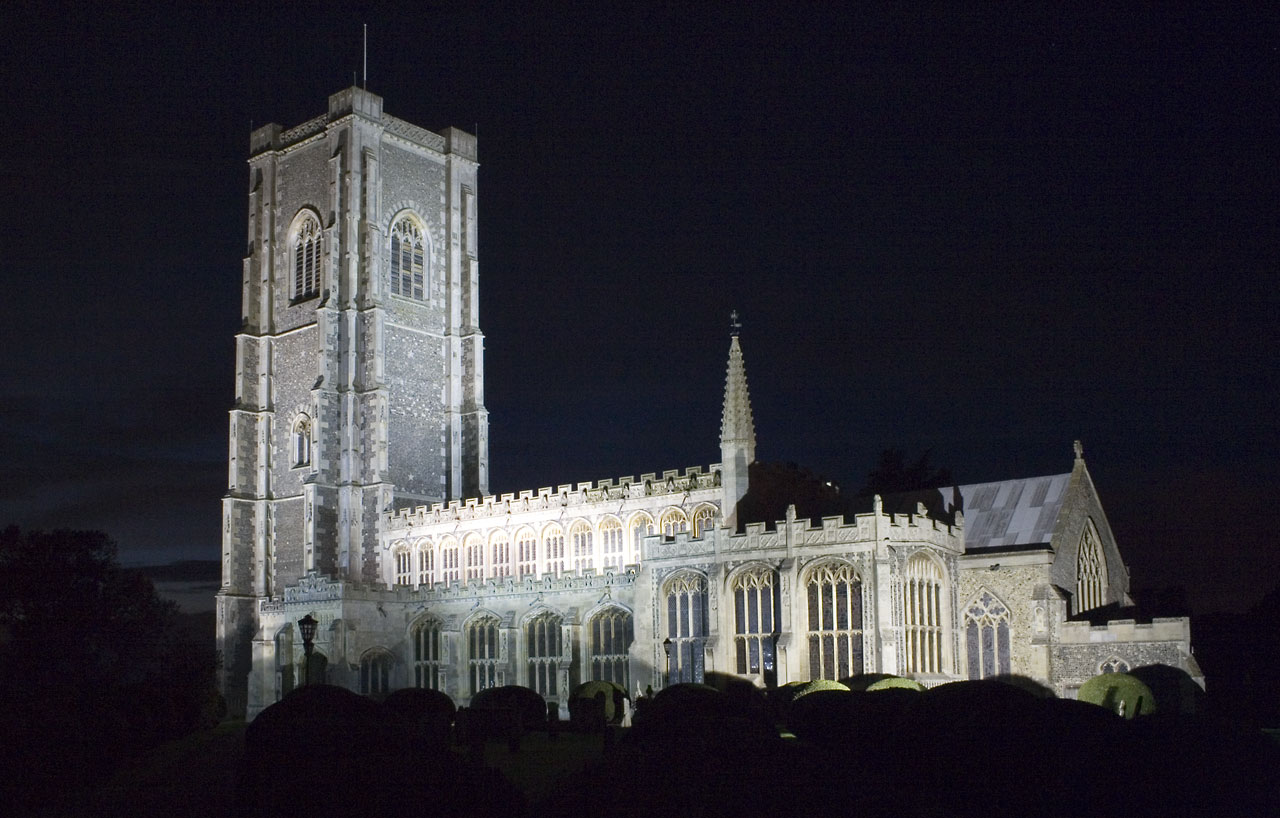
St. Peter and St. Paul, Lavenham, Suffolk

At Lavenham, Suffolk, the striking Perpendicular church is one of England's largest parish churches. With its monumental flint and limestone tower, the Church of Saint Peter and Saint Paul, largely rebuilt in the fifteenth century in the prevailing style, dominates the small weaving village. It was financed largely by donations from two families; the Springs and the de Veres.

=== Winchcombe ===
St Peter's Church, Winchcombe is another fine example of a Cotswold Wool Church. Situated close to the site of the former Winchcombe Abbey, the church is built in Cotswold stone in the traditional Wool Church style.

=== St Clement's, Ipswich ===
St Clement's Church, Ipswich was largely funded by the wool trade passing through the port. The tower was built by donations from wealthy wool merchants.
