= Wool town =

Towns and villages associated with the medieval English wool industry

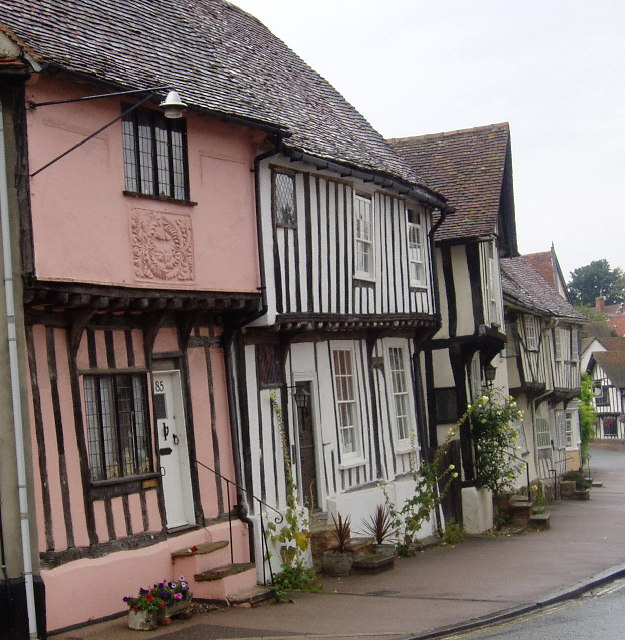
Lavenham in Suffolk, a typical wool town in the East of England.

Wool town is a name given to towns and villages, particularly in Suffolk and north Essex, that were the centre of the woven cloth industry in the Middle Ages.

They came to prominence when weavers from Flanders settled in the area, having been displaced by what came to be known as the Hundred Years' War. Up to that time the English wool trade with the rest of Europe was mostly in the form of the export of raw wool. However, exports of woven cloth quickly replaced the export of raw wool (the latter being heavily taxed by Edward III to help finance the war) and those engaged in the trade began to amass great wealth.

== Churches ==
This wealth in Suffolk wool towns is marked by the beauty of large churches, known as wool churches, built from the prosperity of the wool trade: Long Melford's Holy Trinity "is one of the most moving parish churches in England, large, proud and noble", "so many thin, wiry perpendiculars". Lavenham's St Peter & St Paul "is a match for Long Melford, "a perfect picture". Clare's church of the same name: "all the windows of aisles and clerestory…are slender and closely set…. the same erectness…very airy". Hadleigh's St Mary "Churchyard contains the town's most spectacular buildings, and if one treats the church as essentially C15, then those three buildings belong to the same century but could hardly be more different from one another: one built of stone, one of timber, and one of brick. The Market Hall….the church…the Deanery Tower."

== Heritage ==
Several of the towns in East Anglia that were prosperous during the peak of the English wool trade have retained many of their medieval buildings: Clare "now an exceptionally attractive small town", Long Melford "a rich legacy" with "two fine Tudor mansions"; Lavenham "rightly celebrated", "There is nothing in Suffolk to compete with the timber-framed houses of Lavenham", Hadleigh's "High Street is remarkable for having retained nearly all of its oldest buildings unspoilt while remaining busy and commercial".

The term has also been used to refer to other towns involved in the wool trade. The English Wool Market, c.1230–1327 includes York, Boston, Winchester and Hull in the group, and it has also been applied to towns in the Cotswolds and Yorkshire.
