= 1500 in Scotland =

- Centuries: 13th; 14th; 15th; 16th; 17th
- Decades: 1480s; 1490s; 1500s; 1510s; 1520s
- See also: List of years in Scotland; Timeline of Scottish history 1500 in: England • Elsewhere

Events from the year 1500 in the Kingdom of Scotland.

== Incumbents ==
- Monarch – James IV

== Births ==
- 23 April – Alexander Ales, theologian (died 1565).
- Approximate date – Robert Dunbar of Durris.

== Deaths ==
- Robert Lundie, knight, Master of the Royal Artillery, and Lord High Treasurer of Scotland.
- Approximate date – Hugh Fraser, 1st Lord Lovat.

== See also ==
- Timeline of Scottish history
