= 1526 in Scotland =

- Centuries: 14th; 15th; 16th; 17th; 18th
- Decades: 1500s; 1510s; 1520s; 1530s; 1540s
- See also: List of years in Scotland; Timeline of Scottish history 1526 in: England • Elsewhere

Events from 1526 in the Kingdom of Scotland.

== Incumbents ==
- Monarch – James V

== Events ==
- 21 June – Parliament declares the young King James V of age to rule. A council of guardians of regency for the young king is formed, including Robert Maxwell, 5th Lord Maxwell.
- 29 July – Battle of Melrose fought when Walter Scott of Branxholme and Buccleuch attempted to rescue James V from the powerful Archibald Douglas, 6th Earl of Angus during a royal progress towards the Scottish Borders. Also known as the battle of Darnick.
- 4 September – Battle of Linlithgow Bridge fought between John Stewart, 3rd Earl of Lennox and James Hamilton, 1st Earl of Arran. Lennox is killed by James Hamilton of Finnart.
- 22 October – James Hamilton of Finnart is appointed keeper of Linlithgow Palace.

== Births ==
- Agnes Campbell

== Deaths ==
- 12 April - Robert Cockburn (diplomat)
- Patrick Lindsay, 4th Lord Lindsay

== Buildings and constructions ==
- Morrison's Haven near Prestonpans is established as "Gilbertis-draucht".
