= 1342 in Scotland =

- Centuries: 12th; 13th; 14th; 15th; 16th
- Decades: 1320s; 1330s; 1340s; 1350s; 1360s
- See also: List of years in Scotland; Timeline of Scottish history 1342 in: England • Elsewhere

Events from the year 1342 in the Kingdom of Scotland.

== Incumbents ==
- Monarch – David II

== Events ==
- 30 March – Alexander Ramsay of Dalhousie captured Roxburgh Castle.
- Scots made an attempt to capture Lochmaben Castle, but were repulsed.

== Deaths ==
- Alexander Ramsay of Dalhousie, died of starvation while a prisoner of William Douglas, Lord of Liddesdale in Hermitage Castle.
- William Bullock, died of starvation and exposure while a prisoner in Lochindorb Castle.

== See also ==
- Timeline of Scottish history
