= 1609 in Scotland =

- Centuries: 15th; 16th; 17th; 18th; 19th
- Decades: 1580s; 1590s; 1600s; 1610s; 1620s
- See also: List of years in Scotland; Timeline of Scottish history 1609 in: England • Elsewhere

Events in the year 1609 in Scotland.

== Incumbents ==
- Monarch – James VI

== Events ==
- Establishment of the titles of Lord Dingwall and Lord Cranstoun, two titles in the Peerage of Scotland
- Passing of the Statutes of Iona

== Births ==
- John Gordon, 14th Earl of Sutherland (d. 1679).

== Deaths ==
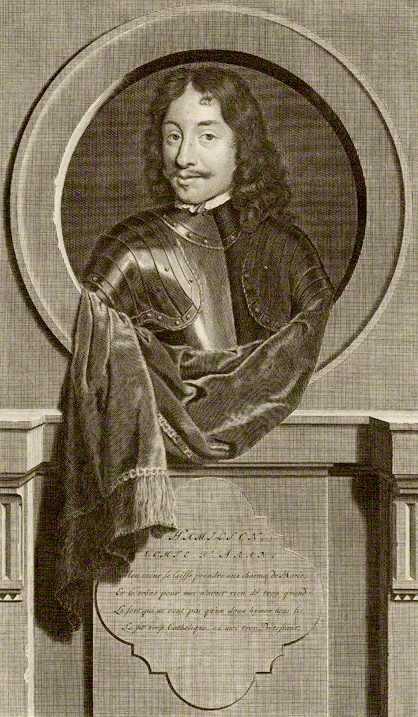
James Hamilton, 3rd Earl of Arran

- 8 April – Mark Kerr, 1st Earl of Lothian, nobleman and politician (b. 1553)
- 2 September – Thomas Scrope, 10th Baron Scrope of Bolton (b. 1567)
- 4 December – Alexander Hume, poet (born c.1560)

=== Full date missing ===
- Jean Fleming, noblewoman (b. 1553/34)
- Patrick Hume of Polwarth, courtier and makar (born c.1550)
- James Hamilton, 3rd Earl of Arran (born c.1532)
