= 1200s in England =

Events from the 1200s in the Kingdom of England.

== Incumbents ==
- Monarch – John

== Events ==
- 1200
  - 22 May – Treaty of Le Goulet signed by King John and Philip II of France, confirming John as ruler of parts of France, in return for some exchange of territory.
  - 24 August – King John marries 12-year-old Isabella of Angoulême at Bordeaux.
  - 8 October – Isabella is crowned queen consort at Westminster Abbey.
  - October – John receives the homage of William I of Scotland at Lincoln.
  - Layamon writes Brut, a history of early Britain, and one of the first works in Middle English.
- 1201
  - 10 April – King John permits Jews to live freely in England and Normandy.
  - 11 July – Llywelyn the Great pays homage to John after Llywelyn has added Eifionydd and Llŷn to his kingdom of Gwynedd in north Wales.
  - King John puts an embargo on wheat exported to Flanders, in an attempt to force an allegiance between the states. He also puts a levy of a fifteenth on the value of cargo exported to France and disallows the export of wool to France without a special license. The levies are enforced in each port by at least six men – including one churchman and one knight.
  - King John affirms that judgments made by the court of Westminster are as valid as those made "before the king himself or his chief justice".
  - Series of Patent Rolls is begun in Chancery.
- 1202
  - 30 April – King John fails to attend the court of Philip II to answer complaints of the barons of Poitou. Philip confiscates English lands in France, granting many of them to Arthur I, Duke of Brittany.
  - July – King John rescues his mother, Eleanor of Aquitaine, from near capture by the rebellious forces of Arthur of Brittany.
  - 1 August – Battle of Mirebeau: John captures Arthur (whom he imprisons in Normandy) and Eleanor of Brittany, together with many important knights whom he imprisons in dungeons in England.
- 1203
  - 3 April – Brittany and Maine rebel following the suspicious death of Arthur of Brittany.
  - April – Philip II seizes the Loire Valley from John.
- 1204
  - 8 March – French capture Château Gaillard from the English.
  - 24 June – Philip II takes Rouen ending Plantagenet rule in Normandy.
  - Beaulieu Abbey founded in Hampshire.
  - King John frees all of Devon except Dartmoor and Exmoor from royal forest law.
  - Jersey, Guernsey and the other Channel Islands become self-governing possessions of the English Crown.
- 1205
  - Harsh winter, in which the Thames freezes over, results in widespread famine.
  - March – barons refuse to support John's war in France.
  - 13 July – monks at Canterbury elect their superior as the new Archbishop of Canterbury.
  - 11 December – King John forces the election of John de Gray, Bishop of Norwich as Archbishop of Canterbury, contrary to the monks' wishes.
  - John begins construction of a royal navy.
  - The Canterbury election of 1205.
- 1206
  - 30 March – Pope Innocent III quashes King John's nomination of John de Gray as Archbishop of Canterbury.
  - 7 June – England invades France to defend Aquitaine; army campaigns in Poitou.
  - 26 October – two-year truce with France agreed.
  - December – monks at Canterbury sent into exile for electing Stephen Langton as Archbishop of Canterbury against King John's wishes.
- 1207
  - 17 June – Pope Innocent III consecrates Stephen Langton as Archbishop of Canterbury.
  - 28 August – King John issues letters patent establishing the borough of Liverpool.
  - Charter establishes the borough of Leeds.
  - John exiles the Archbishop of York and seizes the revenues of Canterbury and York.
- 1208
  - 23 May – Papal Interdict imposed on England, prohibiting certain church rituals; King John confiscates all church property in retaliation.
  - Choir of Lincoln Cathedral completed.
- 1209
  - Easter Monday – Black Monday: a group of 500 settlers recently arrived in Dublin from Bristol are massacred without warning by warriors of the Gaelic O'Byrne clan.
  - August – Scotland buys peace with England after a threatened invasion.
  - October – Llywelyn the Great and other Welsh princes pay homage to King John at Woodstock
  - November – the Pope excommunicates King John.
  - Dissatisfied students from Oxford found the University of Cambridge.

== Births ==
- 1200
  - Adam Marsh, Franciscan (approximate date; died 1259)
  - Matthew Paris, Benedictine monk and chronicler (approximate date; died 1259)
  - William of Sherwood, logician (approximate date; died c.1272)
- 1201
  - 9 August – Arnold Fitz Thedmar, chronicler (died 1274)
- 1207
  - 1 October – King Henry III of England (died 1272)
- 1208
  - Humphrey de Bohun, 2nd Earl of Hereford, Constable of England (died 1275)
  - Simon de Montfort, 6th Earl of Leicester (killed in battle 1265)
- 1209
  - 5 January – Richard, 1st Earl of Cornwall, King of the Romans (died 1272)

== Deaths ==
- 1200
  - William FitzRalph, seneschal of Normandy.
- 1201
  - Walchelin de Ferriers, Anglo-Norman nobleman, soldier and courtier
- 1202
  - 7 May – Hamelin de Warenne, Earl of Surrey (born 1129)
- 1204
  - 21 October – Robert de Beaumont, 4th Earl of Leicester, nobleman (year of birth unknown)
- 1205
  - 13 July – Hubert Walter, Archbishop of Canterbury (year of birth unknown)
- 1206
  - William de Burgh, politician (born 1157)
- 1208
  - 22 April – Philip of Poitou, Prince-Bishop of Durham (year of birth unknown)
