= 1400 in Scotland =

- Centuries: 12th; 13th; 14th; 15th; 16th
- Decades: 1380s; 1390s; 1400s; 1410s; 1420s
- See also: List of years in Scotland; Timeline of Scottish history 1400 in: England • Elsewhere

Events from the year 1400 in the Kingdom of Scotland.

== Incumbents ==
- Monarch – Robert III

== Events ==
- August - English invasion of Scotland - mid-August, Henry IV of England crosses border with army, however returned to England on 29 August.

== See also ==
- Timeline of Scottish history
