= 1502 in Scotland =

- Centuries: 14th; 15th; 16th; 17th; 18th
- Decades: 1480s; 1490s; 1500s; 1510s; 1520s
- See also: List of years in Scotland; Timeline of Scottish history 1502 in: England • Elsewhere

Events from the year 1502 in the Kingdom of Scotland.

== Incumbents ==
- Monarch – James IV

== Events ==
- 24 January – Commissioners from Scotland and England meet at Richmond Palace in London to finalize an agreement on the marriage between James IV of Scotland and Margaret Tudor, daughter of King Henry VII of England, with a dowry of 35,000 Scottish Punnds and an agreement for a "Treaty of Perpetual Peace". The "marriage of the thistle and the rose" will be completed by proxy the following day and in person the following year.
- 21 December – Lauder is granted a new charter as a royal burgh.

== See also ==
- Timeline of Scottish history
