= 1455 in Scotland =

- Centuries: 13th; 14th; 15th; 16th; 17th
- Decades: 1430s; 1440s; 1450s; 1460s; 1470s
- See also: List of years in Scotland; Timeline of Scottish history 1455 in: England • Elsewhere

Events from the year 1455 in Scotland.

== Incumbents ==
- Monarch – James II

== Events ==
- 1 May – Battle of Arkinholm ends in a decisive victory for supporters of James II against the rebel Douglases

== Deaths ==
- Archibald Douglas, Earl of Moray, nobleman (born 1426)
- Hugh Douglas, Earl of Ormonde, nobleman (unknown)
