= Remonstrances =

The Remonstrances of 1297 (sometimes written in the original Anglo-Norman: Monstraunces) were a set of complaints presented by a group of nobles in 1297, against the government of King Edward I of England. Foremost among the nobles were Roger Bigod, Earl of Norfolk, Marshal of England, and Humphrey de Bohun, Earl of Hereford, Constable of England.

The complaints had their background in the heavy burden of taxation caused by King Edward's extensive warfare in the mid-1290s. In 1297 Edward was planning a campaign to protect his possessions in Gascony and his trading interests with Flanders yet it was the opinion of many that this war was unnecessary and risky, in a time when the situation in both Wales and Scotland was threatening. Both Bohun and Bigod refused to serve in the campaign, claiming it was unclear where the expedition was going. Bigod argued in parliament that the earls' military obligation only extended to service alongside the king; if the king intended to sail to Flanders, he could not send his subjects to Gascony. The king nevertheless went on with the planned campaign, and demanded a grant of taxation from his subjects. This became the opposition's main grievance, since they claimed the tax was not raised in the proper manner. Rather than seeking the consent of the community of the realm in parliament, the king had been granted the tax by a small number of his closest supporters. As the king was on the coast preparing for the expedition, Bigod and Bohun turned up at the Exchequer demanding a stop to the collection of the tax, and at the same time presented the Remonstrances.

The document was drawn up not only as a complaint by the two earls, but on behalf of the entire community of the nation. It claimed that the king had driven his subjects to poverty by excessive taxes. Objections against the planned campaign in Flanders were raised, as well as the king's failure to uphold Magna Carta. In addition to the political, financial and constitutional issues, both earls had personal grievances against the king. Bohun had been poorly treated by Edward during a feud with the Earl of Gloucester a few years earlier. Bigod, meanwhile, had been engaged in a long-running dispute over debts he owed to the crown. As the king left for the Continent, the nation seemed to be on the brink of civil war. What brought the issue to a conclusion was the English defeat to the Scots at the Battle of Stirling Bridge. This united the country against a common enemy; Edward promised to address the grievances, while Bigod and Bohun agreed to serve on a campaign in Scotland. As a sign of good will, the king signed the Confirmatio cartarum – a confirmation of Magna Carta.

== See also ==
- Maltolt
