= 1260s in Scotland =

Events from the 1260s in the Kingdom of Scotland.

== Monarchs ==
- Alexander III, 1249–1286

== Events ==
- July 1263 – Haakon IV of Norway sets sail to defend the Hebrides against Alexander III of Scotland, beginning the Scottish–Norwegian War.
- 2 October 1263 – Alexander III launches an attack on the Norwegian forces at the Battle of Largs. The result is inconclusive but the following morning Haakon sails back to Orkney for the winter, where he dies at the Bishop's Palace, Kirkwall on 15 December.
- 1263 – Balliol College, Oxford, England is founded by John I de Balliol. Its first statutes are sealed in 1282 by his widow, Dervorguilla of Galloway.
- 24 November 1265 – with the death of Magnus Olafsson, the Isle of Man comes under direct Scottish rule.
- 2 July 1266 – the Treaty of Perth is signed between Scotland and Norway, and the Isle of Man formally come under Scottish rule.

== Births ==
=== Full date unknown ===
- c. 1266 – John of Strathbogie, 9th Earl of Atholl, warden and Justiciar of Scotland (died 1306)
- 1266 – Duns Scotus, philosopher–theologian (died 1308)

== Deaths ==
- 25 December 1266 – Ada, Countess of Atholl

=== Full date unknown ===
- 1260 – John Bissett of Lovat
- 1263 – William Comyn, Lord of Kilbride
- c. 1263 – Walter de Moravia
- 1265 – Hugh Crawford, Sheriff of Ayrshire, (born 1195)
- 1266 – Máel Coluim II, Earl of Fife
- c. 1268 – Freskin de Moray

== See also ==
- List of years in Scotland
- Timeline of Scottish history
