= 1230s in Scotland =

Events from the 1230s in the Kingdom of Scotland.

== Monarch ==
- Alexander II, 1214–1249

== Events ==
- 1230 – Beauly Priory, Ardchattan Priory and Pluscarden Priory are founded; the latter will be revived to become an abbey in 1974.
- 25 September 1237 – the Treaty of York is signed by kings Alexander II of Scotland and Henry III of England, establishing the border between the two kingdoms.
- 1238 – Inchmahome Priory is founded by Walter Comyn.
- 15 May 1239 – Alexander II marries his second wife, Marie de Coucy.

Undated

- c. 1235 – the first identifiable Scottish parliament is held.

== Births ==
Full date unknown

- c. 1231 – Thomas of Galloway
- c. 1235 – Patrick de Graham (died 1296)
- c. 1235 – Reginald le Chen (died 1312)
- c. 1235 – William de Moravia, 2nd Earl of Sutherland (died 1307)

== Deaths ==
- 31 December 1231 – Patrick I, Earl of Dunbar (born c. 1152)
- 6 January 1233 – Matilda of Chester, Countess of Huntingdon (born 1171 in England)
- 12 February 1233/1234 – Ermengarde de Beaumont (born c. 1170 in France)

Full date unknown

- 1230 – Óspakr-Hákon, King of the Isles
- 1233 – William Comyn, Lord of Badenoch (born c. 1163)
- 1234 – Alan of Galloway
- 1237 – Olaf the Black, King of the Isles
- 1239 – Magnus II, Earl of Orkney (born c. 1185)

== See also ==
- List of years in Scotland
- Timeline of Scottish history
