= Jean Boinebroke of Douai =

French merchant (died 1286)

- Died: 1286; Douai
- Occupation: merchant

Jehan Boinebroke (died 1286 in Douai) was a French merchant from Douai.

He is described in The Cambridge History of Western Textiles as 'undoubtedly the most famous merchant-draper "capitalist" to be found in medieval western Europe' and is sometimes depicted as a medieval robber baron.

== Life ==
Boinebroke was alderman (échevin) of his city nine times and accumulated a considerable fortune in the course of his life. He had wool imported from England to Douai and had peasant women spin it into yarn. He also developed a dyeing factory.

He made his workers live in its houses at inflated rents, which led to a riot by artisans and workers in Douai in 1245. A second episode of unrest against his leadership came in 1280, this time extending from Ypres to Tournai and Douai, with Boinebroke being able to overcome the rebellion in Douai. He was also considered to be merciless to his debtors, which was highly condemned in an era when usury was seen as a major sin.

In his will Boinebroke decreed that the executor should first pay his debts and make up for all the wrong caused by him before his property should go to his four children. When he died in 1286 at Douai, numerous individuals submitted their complaints. The compiled grew into a 5.5 m long parchment.

== Legacy ==
Modern historians, in the tradition of Karl Marx, have often viewed Boinebroke's business activity as an early example capitalist exploitation of his workers. However, other historians claim that he was never an industrialist who owned factories or manufactures, but rather a trader whose reputation was built on over the centuries through, sometimes, deliberate meddling by scholars. In the assessment of John H. Munro,

he was no 'industrial capitalist', a term that is clearly an anachronism for this era. He was instead principally a wool merchant, dealing in English and domestic wools, and his role as a cloth merchant was only secondary ... he owned land, with many properties in Douia itself and a sheep farm outside. As a merchant, he provided wool on credit to industrial drapers, who pledged their cloths, looms and sometimes even their home as security; and some of them also rented their houses from him. But most of his wage-earning employees were those required for the wool trade itself: sorters, beaters, washers and some wool dyers (who worked in his dyehouse). Although Boinebroke did employ a few others in cloth making, chiefly to work some tentering frames that he owned, there is absolutely no evidence that he ever directly supervised the central processes of cloth production.

== Key studies ==
- Georges Espinas: Les origines du capitalisme I: Sire Jehan Boinebroke patricien et drapier douaisien. Bibliothèque de la Société d'histoire du droit des pays flamands, picards et wallons 7. Lille 1933.
