= 1210s in Scotland =

Events from the 1210s in the Kingdom of Scotland.

== Monarchs ==
- William I, 1165–1214
- Alexander II, 1214–1249

== Events ==
- 4 December 1214 – King William I dies in Stirling and is succeeded by his son, King Alexander II.
- 6 December 1214 – Alexander II is crowned at Scone.
- 1217 – Culross Abbey is established by Maol Choluim I, Earl of Fife in Culross.

== Births ==
Full date unknown

- c. 1210 – Gilbert, Earl of Orkney (died c. 1256)
- c. 1210 – Dervorguilla of Galloway (died 1290)
- c. 1210 – William de Moravia, 1st Earl of Sutherland (died 1248)
- 1211 – Henry, Earl of Atholl
- c. 1213 – Patrick III, Earl of Dunbar (died 1289)
- 1214 – Alexander Stewart, 4th High Steward of Scotland (died c. 1282)
- c. 1215 – John Comyn I of Badenoch (died c. 1274)
- c. 1215 – Robert de Brus, 5th Lord of Annandale (died 1295)

== Deaths ==
- 16 July 1212 – William de Brus, 3rd Lord of Annandale
- 4 December 1214 – King William I (born c. 1142)
- 17 June 1219 – David, Earl of Huntingdon (born 1152)

Full date unknown

- c. 1211 – Gofraid mac Domnaill
- c. 1217 – Ailín II, Earl of Lennox
- c. 1219 – Hugh de Moravia

== See also ==
- List of years in Scotland
- Timeline of Scottish history
