= 1503 in Scotland =

- Centuries: 14th; 15th; 16th; 17th; 18th
- Decades: 1480s; 1490s; 1500s; 1510s; 1520s
- See also: List of years in Scotland; Timeline of Scottish history 1503 in: England • Elsewhere

Events from the year 1503 in the Kingdom of Scotland.

== Incumbents ==
- Monarch – James IV

== Events ==
- 8 August – Marriage of James IV and Margaret Tudor.

== Deaths ==
- 11 March – John Stewart, Earl of Mar (born 1479).
- 20 May – William Borthwick, 3rd Lord Borthwick.

Unknown date

- John Macdonald II, the last Lord of the Isles (born 1434).

== See also ==
- Timeline of Scottish history
