= Medieval English wool trade =

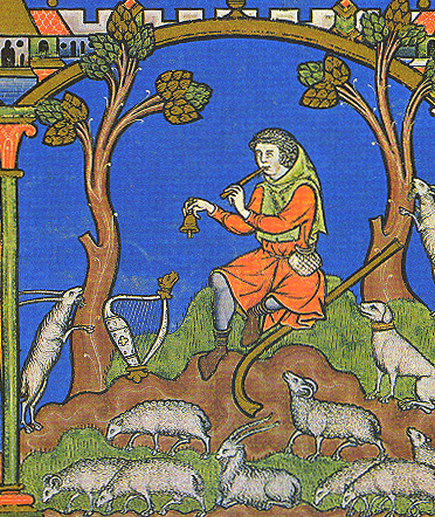
Sheep, shown here in the 1240s or the 1250s, became increasingly important to English agriculture.

The wool trade was one of the most important factors in the medieval English economy. The medievalist John Munro notes that "no form of manufacturing had a greater impact upon the economy and society of medieval Britain than did those industries producing cloths from various kinds of wool." The trade's liveliest period, 1250–1350, was "an era when trade in wool had been the backbone and driving force in the English medieval economy".

The wool trade was a major driver of enclosure (the privatisation of common land) in English agriculture, which in turn had major social consequences, as part of the British Agricultural Revolution. Medieval England had an extensive local supply of wool ("unrivalled elsewhere in Europe", according to one economic historian). The English innovated mechanised methods for fulling cloth in the 13th century.

Among the lasting monuments to the success of the trade are the 'wool churches' of East Anglia and the Cotswolds; the London Worshipful Company of Clothworkers; and the fact that since the fourteenth century, the presiding officer of the House of Lords has sat on the Woolsack, a chair stuffed with wool.

== Early Middle Ages ==
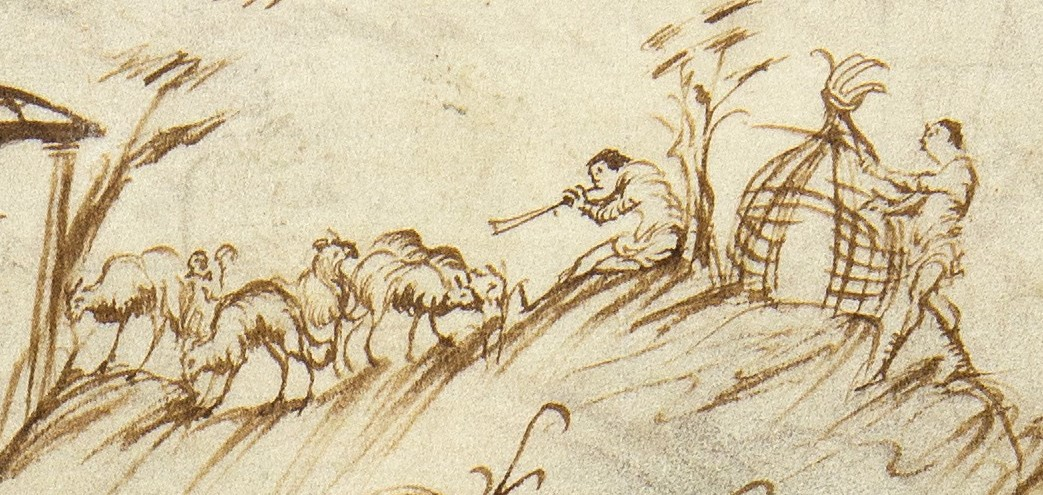
Shepherd blowing horn in the Utrecht Psalter.

During the early Anglo-Saxon period (c. 450–650), archaeological evidence for weaving using warp-weighted looms is extensive, imply at least subsistence-level wool production. Tools and technologies of spinning and weaving were similar to those of the Roman period; it is likely that fine, white wool continued to be produced from sheep introduced from the Mediterranean region alongside coarser local wools. Dyes included woad for blue and less frequently madder and lichens for reds and purples. Some high-status woollen cloth is found, including gold brocade. New textile types appeared around the tenth century, prominently including diamond twills whose use continued into the thirteenth century. There is little evidence for long-distance trade, but there seems to have been some, presumably of especially rare wools or cloths: the silence of the sources is interrupted by a famous mention of the slipping standards of English cloaks exported to Francia in a letter from Charlemagne to Offa of Mercia. By the eleventh century, however, sheep were numerous in England, and at least some export of their wool by low German merchants was taking place; Peter Sawyer argued that wool was already a major source of wealth and an important export commodity in England at this time.

== Later Middle Ages ==
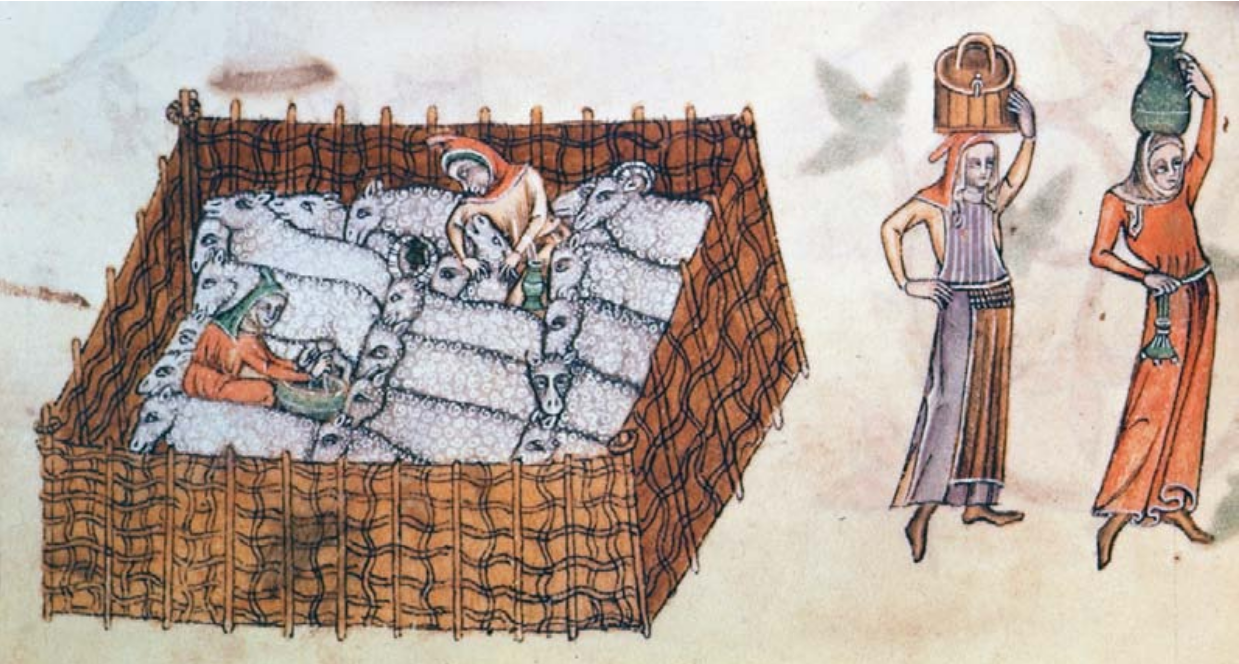
Sheep pen (Luttrell Psalter)

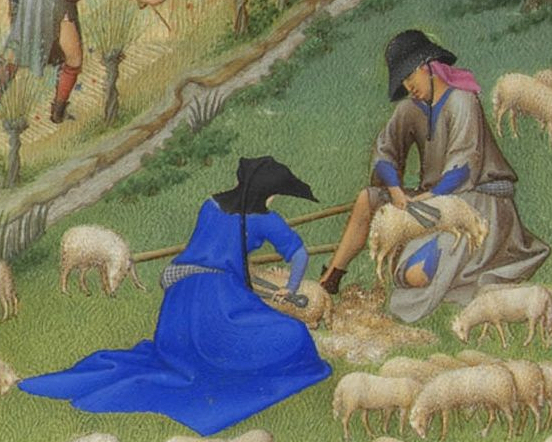
Sheep shearing as depicted in Les Très Riches Heures du Duc de Berry.

Subsistence-level production of wool continued, but was overshadowed by the rise of wool as a commodity, which in turn encouraged demand for other raw materials such as dyestuffs; the rise of manufacturing; the financial sector; urbanisation; and (since wool and related raw materials had a high value-to-weight ratio and were easily transported) regional, international, and even intercontinental trade.

English wools, particularly from the Welsh Marches, the South West and Lincolnshire, were the most prized in medieval Europe. They were exported to the emergent urban centres of cloth production of the Low Countries, France, and Italy, where production was promoted by the adoption of the pedal-driven horizontal loom and spinning wheel, along with mechanised fulling and napping.

The English imported more foreign cloth at the start of the 14th century than they exported wool cloth. In the 1330s, imports of foreign cloth collapsed and by the 1340s, imports of foreign cloth had almost disappeared. The onset of war led the English to protect their home industry and impose hindrances on imports of foreign cloth. According to one 1950 study, "war-time needs, war-time diplomatic policy, and war-time fiscal policy, had together given an immense impetus to the development of England's woollen industry" in the 14th century.

In 1280 about 25,000 sacks of wool were exported from England; trade in raw wool peaked around 40,000–45,000 sacks per year, falling to 33,000 in 1355 and 9,706 in 1476 as exports changed to finished cloth. As exports of raw wool fell, exports of cloths rose, from 10,000 cloths per year in 1349–50 to 60,000 in 1446–47, and c. 140,000 in 1539–40. "By the end of the thirteenth century, the heavily industrialised areas of Europe could not have existed without the export of English wool".

English wool production declined by a third from the early fourteenth to the mid-fifteenth century.

England's wool-trade was volatile, however, affected by diverse factors such as war, taxation policy, export/import duties or even bans, disease and famine, and the degree of competition among European merchants for English wool. For example, since Continental industry relied on English wool, and export embargoes could 'bring whole areas to the brink of starvation and economic ruin', the wool trade was a powerful political tool. Likewise, taxes on the wool trade financed Edward I's wars and enabled England to conduct the Hundred Years' War with better resources than France. These instabilities led to a boom-bust cycle in prices and exports. The wool subsidy in the fourteenth century developed not just into an important revenue for the government, but as security for borrowing money.

In the twelfth and thirteenth centuries, the English wool trade was primarily with Flanders (where wool was made into cloth, primarily for sale via the Champagne fairs into the Mediterranean basin), and was dominated by Flemish merchants. But in 1264, the strife in England of the Second Barons' War brought Anglo-Flemish trade almost to a halt and by 1275, when Edward I of England negotiated an agreement with the domestic merchant community (and secured a permanent duty on wool), Italian merchants had begun to gain dominance in the trade. Extending their activities to finance, the Riccardi, a group of bankers from Lucca in Italy, became particularly prominent in English taxation and finance. Among the most famous merchants participating in the English wool trade were Jean Boinebroke of Douai (d. 1286) on the Continental side, and William de la Pole (d. 1366) on the English. During the 14th and 15th century, English merchants brought woollen cloth and other goods to Iceland, trading it mainly for dried fish, but also for Icelandic vaðmál (coarse wool fabric).

Guild organisations seem to have emerged in the textile industry in England in the 12th century. This was earlier than elsewhere in Europe.

== Early Modern period ==
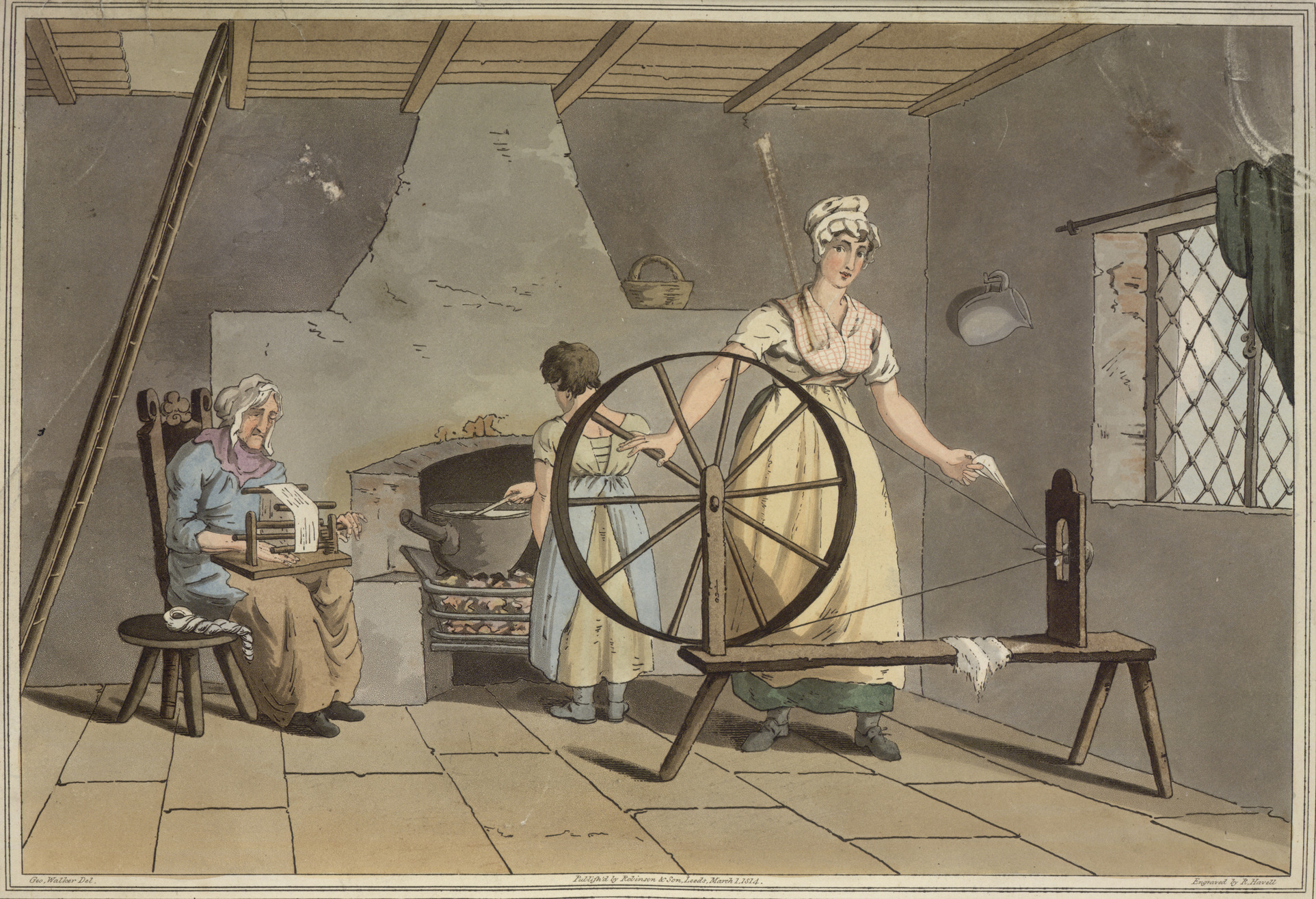
George Walker, 1814

By the sixteenth century, the quality of English wools was in decline, perhaps partly due to a switch in focus to meat production for domestic urban markets, and European supremacy in the production of fine-wool passed to the Iberian peninsula and its merino sheep.

== Key statistics ==
The table charts English woolsack and broadcloth exports, in five-year means, 1281–1545.

Years Michaelmas	Woolsack exports (5-yr means)	Broadcloth exports	Total as equivalent broadcloth
1281–5	26,879.20		116,554.44
1286–90	26,040.80		112,843.38
1291–5	27,919.20		120,983.11
1296–1300	23,041.20		99,845.12
1301–5	32,344.00		140,157.23
1306–10	39,016.20		169,070.07
1311–15	35,328.60		153,090.48
1316–20	26,084.60		113,033.18
1321–25	25,315.40		109,699.98
1326–30	24,997.60		108,322.85
1331–35	33,645.60		145,797.49
1336–40	20,524.80		88,940.73
1341–45	18,075.58		78,327.43
1346–50	27,183.13	2,556	120,349.12
1351–55	30,750.40	1,921	135,172.83
1356–60	32,666.40	9,061	150,615.29
1361–65	30,129.20	11,717	142,276.97
1366–70	26,451.80	14,527	129,151.58
1371–75	25,867.80	12,211	124,305.11
1376–80	20,470.20	13,643	102,346.73
1381–85	17,517.40	22,242	98,150.67
1386–90	19,312.00	25,610	109,295.27
1391–95	18,513.80	39,525	119,751.60
1396–1400	16,889.60	38,775	111,963.31
1401–5	12,904.20	34,570	90,487.76
1406–10	14,968.20	31,746	96,609.35
1411–15	13,593.20	27,183	86,087.22
1416–20	14,365.00	27,977	90,225.49
1421–25	14,425.20	40,275	102,003.75
1426–30	13,358.60	40,406	98,292.82
1431–35	9,384.60	40,027	80,693.97
1436–40	5,378.80	47,072	70,380.12
1441–45	8,029.40	56,456	91,249.84
1446–50	9,765.20	45,847	88,162.63
1451–55	8,790.80	36,700	74,793.44
1456–60	6,386.40	36,489	64,163.38
1461–65	6,386.00	29,002	56,674.25
1466–70	9,293.60	37,447	77,719.64
1471–75	8,453.40	36,537	73,168.57
1476–80	8,736.00	50,441	88,296.77
1481–85	7,621.40	54,198	87,223.84
1486–90	9,751.00	50,005	92,259.50
1491–95	6,755.20	56,945	86,217.11
1496–1500	8,937.20	62,853	101,311.24
1501–5	7,806.80	77,271	111,100.24
1506–10	7,326.20	84,803	116,549.44
1511–15	7,087.20	86,592	117,303.18
1516–20	8,194.40	90,099	125,607.84
1521–25	5,131.60	82,269	104,505.72
1526–30	4,834.80	93,534	114,485.18
1531–35	3,005.20	94,087	107,109.32
1536–40	3,951.40	109,278	126,400.72
1541–45	4,576.00	118,056	137,884.92

== See also ==
- Wool town
- Wool church
