= 1200s in Scotland =

Events from the 1200s in the Kingdom of Scotland.

== Monarch ==
- William I, 1165–1214

== Events ==
1200

- Inchaffray Abbey is erected in Madderty.

1202

- Florence of Holland is elected Bishop of Glasgow.
- William de Malveisin is elected Bishop of St Andrews.
- the Scottish invasion force enters Caithness.

1207

- Holy Trinity Church in Spynie is founded on Moray.

== Deaths ==
- 12 December 1200 – Lochlann of Galloway
- 7 July 1202 – Roger de Beaumont, Bishop of St. Andrews

Full date unknown

- c. 1203 – Gille Críst, Earl of Mar
- 1204 – Alan fitz Walter, 2nd High Steward of Scotland (born c. 1140)
- 1208 – Thomas of Galloway (died c. 1296)

== See also ==
- List of years in Scotland
- Timeline of Scottish history
