= 1504 in Scotland =

- Centuries: 14th; 15th; 16th; 17th; 18th
- Decades: 1480s; 1490s; 1500s; 1510s; 1520s
- See also: List of years in Scotland; Timeline of Scottish history 1504 in: England • Elsewhere

Events from the year 1504 in the Kingdom of Scotland.

== Incumbents ==
- Monarch – James IV

== Births ==
- unknown date – Patrick Hamilton, churchman, early Protestant Reformer and martyr (died 1528)

== Deaths ==
- January – James Stewart, Duke of Ross (born 1476)

== See also ==
- Timeline of Scottish history
