= 1608 in Scotland =

- Centuries: 15th; 16th; 17th; 18th; 19th
- Decades: 1580s; 1590s; 1600s; 1610s; 1620s
- See also: List of years in Scotland; Timeline of Scottish history 1608 in: England • Elsewhere

Events in the year 1608 in Scotland.

== Incumbents ==
- Monarch – James VI

== Events ==
=== Architecture ===
- May 8 – Works by Bevis Bulmer commence at a newly nationalized silver mine at Hilderston, West Lothian.
- Tullibole Castle constructed

=== Sport ===
- The Lanark Silver Bell (horse racing trophy) established

== Births ==
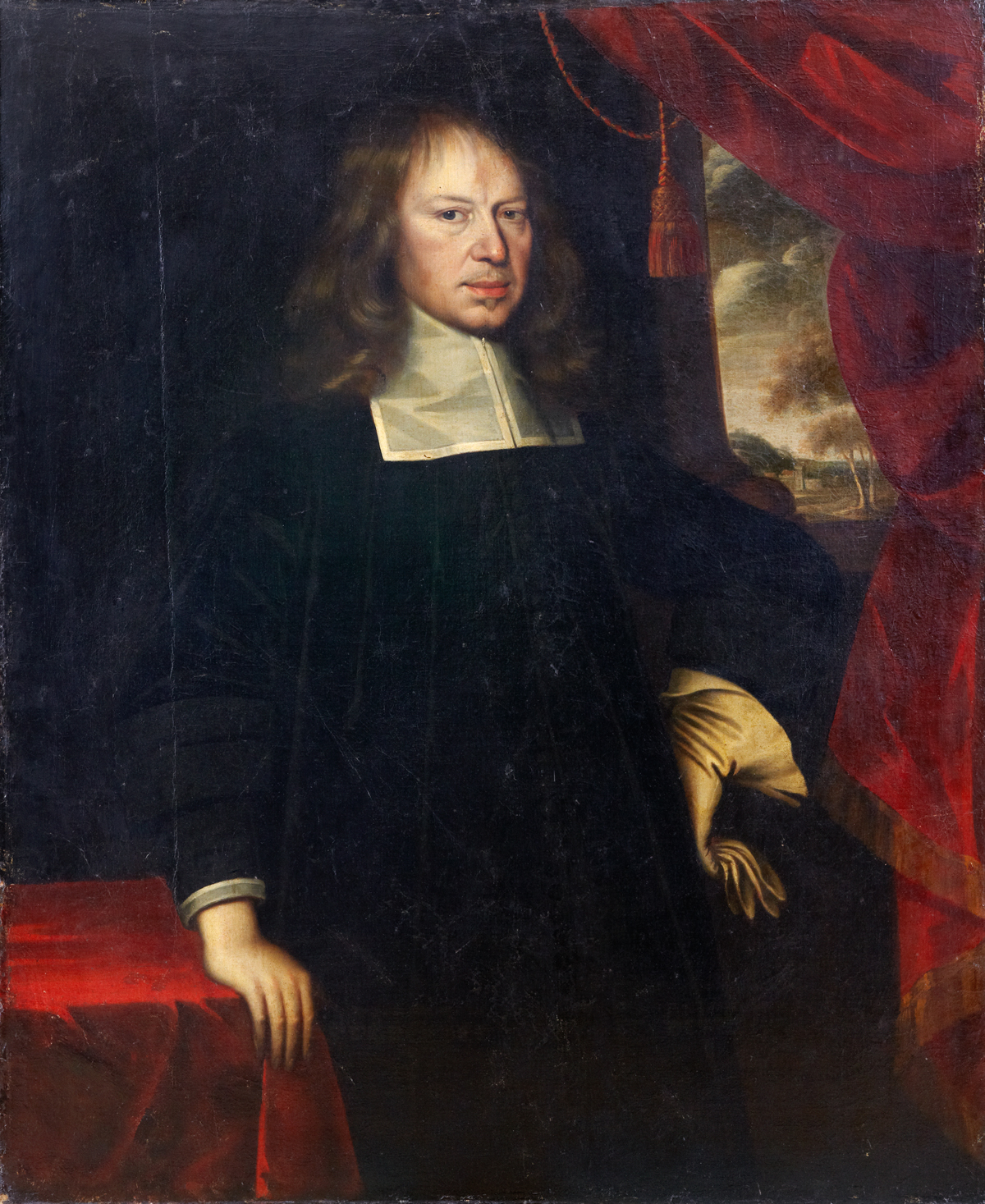
James Steuart of Coltness

- James Steuart of Coltness, merchant, banker, landowner, politician and Covenanter (died 1681).

== Deaths ==
- 26 February – Thomas Craig, jurist and poet (born c.1538)
- 15 May – Archibald Napier landowner and official, master of the Scottish mint and seventh Laird of Merchiston (born 1534)
- 9 November – John Graham, 3rd Earl of Montrose, peer, Chancellor of the University of St Andrews and Lord High Commissioner to the Parliament of Scotland (born 1548).

=== Full date missing ===
- George Bannatyne, merchant, collector of Scottish poems (born 1545)
- Alexander Campbell of Carco, noble and prelate
- William Barclay, jurist (born 1546)
