= 1590s in Scotland =

- 1580s | 1590s | 1600s

This article lists events from the 1590s in Scotland.

== Incumbents ==
Monarch of Scotland

- James VI (1567–1625)

Duke of Rothesay, Prince and Great Steward of Scotland, etc.

- Henry Frederick Stuart (1594–1612)

== Events ==
=== 1590 ===
- Entry and coronation of Anne of Denmark.
- The North Berwick witch trials begin.

=== 1592 ===
- Margaret Vinstarr plans the escape of her lover John Wemyss of Logie from Dalkeith Palace.

=== 1594 ===
- The christening of Prince Henry is celebrated at Stirling Castle with a tournament, a feast, and a masque.

=== 1597 ===
- King James VI publishes his Daemonologie, detailing his reflections and studies on the matter of how to deal with witchcraft.

=== 1598 ===
- William Schaw issues the first of the Schaw Statutes of masonry, the Second Statute following in 1599.
