= Forfar Castle =

Location
- Location within Angus
- Coordinates: 56.646°N 2.890°W

Site history
- Built: 11th century

Forfar Castle was an 11th-century castle to the west of Forfar, Scotland.

== History ==
The castle was apparently surrounded by water and was used as a royal castle by the Scottish kings Malcolm III, William I and Alexander II. Malcolm used it as a base for raising an army to repel Danish invaders. The castle was surrendered to the English and was garrisoned by Edward I of England, who visited it in 1296. In 1306, King Robert I of Scotland captured the castle and burned it. Subsequently, the castle was rebuilt by the English and was in English hands until the Scots, led by Philp the Forester of Platan, recaptured it on Christmas Day, 1308, and slaughtered the garrison. After demolition and rebuilding in 1308, the castle was destroyed again in 1313 and was abandoned by the 1330s.

No trace of the castle remains above ground, although there were remains up to the 17th century.
