= Maltolt =

Historical English commodity tax

Maltolt or "bad tax" (in Norman-French) was the name given to the new taxes on wool in England of 1294–1297. Protests against the maltolt played their part in forcing the confirmation of the charters from the Crown.

== Origin ==
Edward I of England had been granted a half-mark (6s 8d) customs duty per sack on the export of wool, woolfells and hides by the Parliament of 1275. The outbreak of the Gascon War against France in 1294 in led to the royal seizure of all wool and leather in the realm, and its release only on a duty of 40 shillings per sack. The old duty quickly became known as the "Ancient Custom", and was contrasted strongly with what G. M. Trevelyan would call "These 'maltoltes' or 'ill takings' of wool".

== Protests ==
Dislike of the maltolts (which had been repeated in the years 1295–1297) fed into the noble and clerical opposition to the Crown that culminated in the Remonstrances of 1297. "Also the whole community feel that they are oppressed by the tax on wools, which is too heavy, namely at 40 shillings on the sack, and 7 marks the sack on broken wool; for the wool of England approaches the value of half of all the land".

Among the six articles appended to the confirmation of the charters was, accordingly, a provision prohibiting the seizure of wool in future; to which the King responded by reserving to the crown “the custom on wool, skins and leather already granted by the commonalty of the realm”, so that it was only after a further struggle that the maltolt was finally laid to rest in 1301.

== Reappearance ==
The maltolt reappeared in the reign of Edward III of England, as a result of a bargain he made in 1337 offering rich merchants a monopoly in exchange for a duty of 40s a sack. It also gained the name of the wool subsidy and was often referred to as a loan.

The Commons petitioned against the deal, either (as Eileen Power thought) in the hope of abolishing it entirely, or simply to ensure their participation in the taxation process - something which they eventually achieved, if at the price of customs on wool continuing to fund the Crown throughout the Hundred Years War.

== See also ==
- Taxation in medieval England
- Statute of the Staple
