= David de Inchmartin =

14th century knight

- Died: 4 August 1306

Sir David de Inchmartin (died 4 August 1306) was a Scottish knight who took part in the War of Scottish Independence, as a supporter of Robert de Brus. He was captured and later executed by the English in 1306

== Life ==
David was the son of John de Inchmartin. He held lands in Inchmartine (now Inchture), in Perth and Kinross. He was with Robert the Bruce at the Battle of Methven. During the battle on 19 June 1306, David was captured by English forces under Aymer de Valence, Earl of Pembroke. A number of Bruce's closest supporters were also captured. The Earl of Pembroke refused to summarily execute the prisoners as ordered by Edward I of England. David was executed by hanging on 4 August at Newcastle upon Tyne.
