= Baldred Bisset =

Scottish lawyer

Baldred Bisset (c. 1260 – 1311?) was a medieval Scottish lawyer.

== Life ==
During the Scottish Wars of Independence, he was responsible for the Scottish submissions to the papal curia of 1301. Along with his colleagues William Frere and William of Eaglesham he prepared the Scottish case for sovereignty in the face of English claims and aggression by drawing upon and modifying the existing literature dealing with the foundation myths of the Scottish people, as well as those of the other inhabitants of what would later be called Great Britain, and with a lawyer's eye appraising the historical treaties between the two nations such as the Treaty of Falaise of 1174–1189 and their evolution or repudiation.

He was deprived of the parsonage of Kinghorn by King Edward I of England.
