= 1240s in Scotland =

Events from the 1240s in the Kingdom of Scotland.

== Monarchs ==
- Alexander II, 1214–1249
- Alexander III, 1249–1286

== Events ==
- 13 May 1240 – The Church of Blackfriars is dedicated in Perth.
- 1244 – Crossraguel Abbey is founded by Donnchadh, Earl of Carrick.
- 14 August 1244 – the first Treaty of Newcastle is signed between Kings Henry III of England and Alexander II of Scotland at Ponteland. The treaty arranged the marriage of Henry III's daughter, Margaret to Alexander II's son, Alexander III of Scotland.
- 1249 – the March law is first codified to settle with cross-border disputes in the Scottish Marches.
- 6 July 1249 – Alexander II dies on the Isle of Kerrera and is succeeded by his son, Alexander III.
- 13 July 1249 – Alexander III is crowned at Scone at the age of 7.

== Births ==
- 4 September 1241 – King Alexander III (died 1296)

Full date unknown

- 1242 – Patrick IV, Earl of March (died 1308)
- 1243 – William the Hardy, Lord of Douglas (died 1298 in England)
- c. 1249 – John Balliol - King of Scots from 1292 to 1296 (died 1314)

== Deaths ==
- 6 July 1249 – King Alexander II (born 1198)

Full date unknown

- 1242 – Walter de Olilfard
- 1241 – Andreas de Moravia
- c. 1244 – Robert, Earl of Strathearn
- 1245 – Gilbert de Moravia
- c. 1245 – Richard de Moravia
- c. 1246 – Donnchadh of Argyll
- c. 1247 – Ruaidhrí mac Raghnaill
- 1248 – William de Moravia, 1st Earl of Sutherland (born c. 1210)

== See also ==
- List of years in Scotland
- Timeline of Scottish history
