= Battle of Turnberry =

14th-century battle in Scotland

- Part of First War of Scottish Independence
Date	February 1307
Location	near Turnberry, Scotland 55.32°N 4.83°W
Result	Scottish victory

Belligerents
Kingdom of Scotland	Kingdom of England

Commanders and leaders
King Robert I Edward Bruce; James Douglas	Baron Percy

Strength
Unknown	Unknown

Casualties and losses
Low	Heavy

The Battle of Turnberry was fought in February 1307 during the Scottish Wars of Independence near Turnberry, Ayrshire, Scotland.

King Robert I of Scotland's invasion of his ancestral lands in Annandale and Carrick began in 1307. The Carrick invasion force was led by Robert, his brother Edward de Brus, James Douglas, Lord of Douglas and Robert Boyd. The force comprised thirty three galleys. They sailed to Turnberry and landed near Turnberry Castle. The invasion force quickly overwhelmed the English forces of Henry de Percy, 1st Baron Percy encamped around Turnberry Castle, but failed to take the castle.

Henry de Percy was forced to leave the castle after this defeat.
