= 1290s in Scotland =

Events from the 1290s in Scotland.

== Monarchs ==
- Margaret, 1286–1290 (uncrowned)
- Guardians of Scotland, during the first (1286–1292) and second (1296–1306) interregnums
- John Balliol, 1292–1296

== Events ==
1290

- 18 July 1290 – the second Treaty of Birgham is drafted in Birgham.
- 28 August 1290 – the second Treaty of Birgham is ratified at Northampton, arranging for the marriage of the Scottish heir, Margaret, to the son of Edward I of England. The treaty ensured that their domains would remain "separate and divided", contrary to common marriage laws, ensuring the two kingdoms remained independent.
- 26 September 1290 – heir to the throne, Margaret, dies in Orkney leading to competition for the Crown of Scotland.

1291

- January 1291 – the Bishop of Durham, Antony Bek, arrives in Scotland on a diplomatic mission.
- May 1291 – King Edward I of England arrives at Norham, England and sends correspondence to the Guardians of Scotland demanding that his claim of feudal overlordship of Scotland be recognised.
- 3 June 1291 – the English army musters at Norham.
- 6 June 1291 – the Guardians of Scotland and the Scottish nobility agree on terms to have Edward I arbitrate over the selection of the next King of Scotland from amongst the competitors.
- 6 June 1291 – the realm and the principal royal castles of Scotland are placed in temporary control of Edward I.
- 13 June 1291 – the Guardians of Scotland and the Scottish nobility swear fealty to Edward I at Upsettlington, on the river bank opposite Norham Castle. This was followed later by swearing of fealty at Perth, Ayr, Inverness and Galloway.

1292

- November 1292 – Robert de Brus, Lord of Annandale surrenders his lordship of Annandale to his son Robert Bruce, jure uxoris Earl of Carrick, who then surrendered the earldom of Carrick to his son Robert the Bruce.
- 17 November 1292 – the Scottish auditors, led by Edward I of England, decide in favour of claimant John Balliol.
- 30 November 1292 – John Balliol is inaugurated as King of Scotland at Scone.
- 26 December 1292 – King John Balloil swears homage to King Edward I at Newcastle upon Tyne, Northumberland, England.

1295

- 23 October 1295 – the Treaty of Paris (1295) is signed, forming the Auld Alliance between the kingdoms of Scotland and France.

1296

- 28 March 1296 – the English army crosses the River Tweed, beginning an invasion of Scotland.
- 30 March 1296 – Sack of Berwick
- 27 April 1296 – Battle of Dunbar
- 10 July 1296 – John Balliol formally abdicates, ceding the Scottish realm, people, and royal seal to Edward I by a deed signed at Brechin Castle.

1297

- May 1297 – Action at Lanark
- June 1297 – Raid on Scone
- 11 September 1297 – Battle of Stirling Bridge

1298

- 3 July 1298 – Edward I returns with military forces to Scotland, beginning another invasion of Scotland.
- 22 July 1298 – Battle of Falkirk

1299

- 27 June 1299 – Pope Boniface VIII issues the papal bull Scimus, Fili, condemning Edward I's invasions of Scotland and calling for peace negotiations.

== Births ==
- 1 November 1299 – Elizabeth de Comyn (died 1372)

Full date unknown

- c. 1294 – John Comyn IV of Badenoch (died 1314)
- 1298 – Andrew Murray, military and political leader (died 1338)

== Deaths ==
- 28 January 1290 – Dervorguilla of Galloway (born c. 1210)
- 26 September 1290 – Margaret, heir to the Scottish throne (born 1283 in Norway)
- 31 March 1295 – Robert de Brus, 5th Lord of Annandale (born c. 1215)
- 27 April 1296 – Patrick de Graham (born c. 1235)
- 22 July 1298
  - John de Graham
  - John Stewart
  - Macduff of Fife

Full date unknown

- 1291 – William Comyn of Kirkintilloch
- c. November 1292 – Marjorie, Countess of Carrick
- 1293 – Reginald le Chen
- c. 1293 – Aonghus Mór
- c. 1296 – Thomas of Galloway (born 1208)
- c. 1296 – Cailean Mór
- c. November 1297 – Andrew Moray
- c. 1299 – Alasdair Óg of Islay

== See also ==
- List of years in Scotland
- Timeline of Scottish history
