= Carta Mercatoria =

The Carta Mercatoria, meaning 'the charter of the merchants', was a 1303 charter granted by Edward I to foreign merchants in England, in exchange for the foreign merchants paying a new tax on imports. It guaranteed them freedom to trade, protection under the law, and exemption from tolls on bridges, roads and cities. It also guaranteed no increase in the duty rates they paid. Additionally, the Carta Mercatoria gave foreigners (or 'aliens' in the parlance of the charter) the official right to be tried by a jury which was at least partially composed of other foreigners.

The charter was revoked by Edward II, owing to complaints by English merchants. In practice however, foreign merchants retained most of their rights.

In 1334, in exchange for financial assistance, Edward III replaced the general grant of rights to foreign merchants with a particular charter granted to the Hanseatic League.
