= 1580s in Scotland =

- 1570s | 1580s | 1590s

This article lists events from the 1580s in Scotland.

== Incumbents ==
Monarch of Scotland

- James VI (1567–1625)

== Events ==
=== 1586 ===
- Treaty of Berwick
