= Battle of Methven =

Part of the Wars of Scottish Independence

Coordinates: 56.42014°N 3.58201°W

- Part of the First War of Scottish Independence
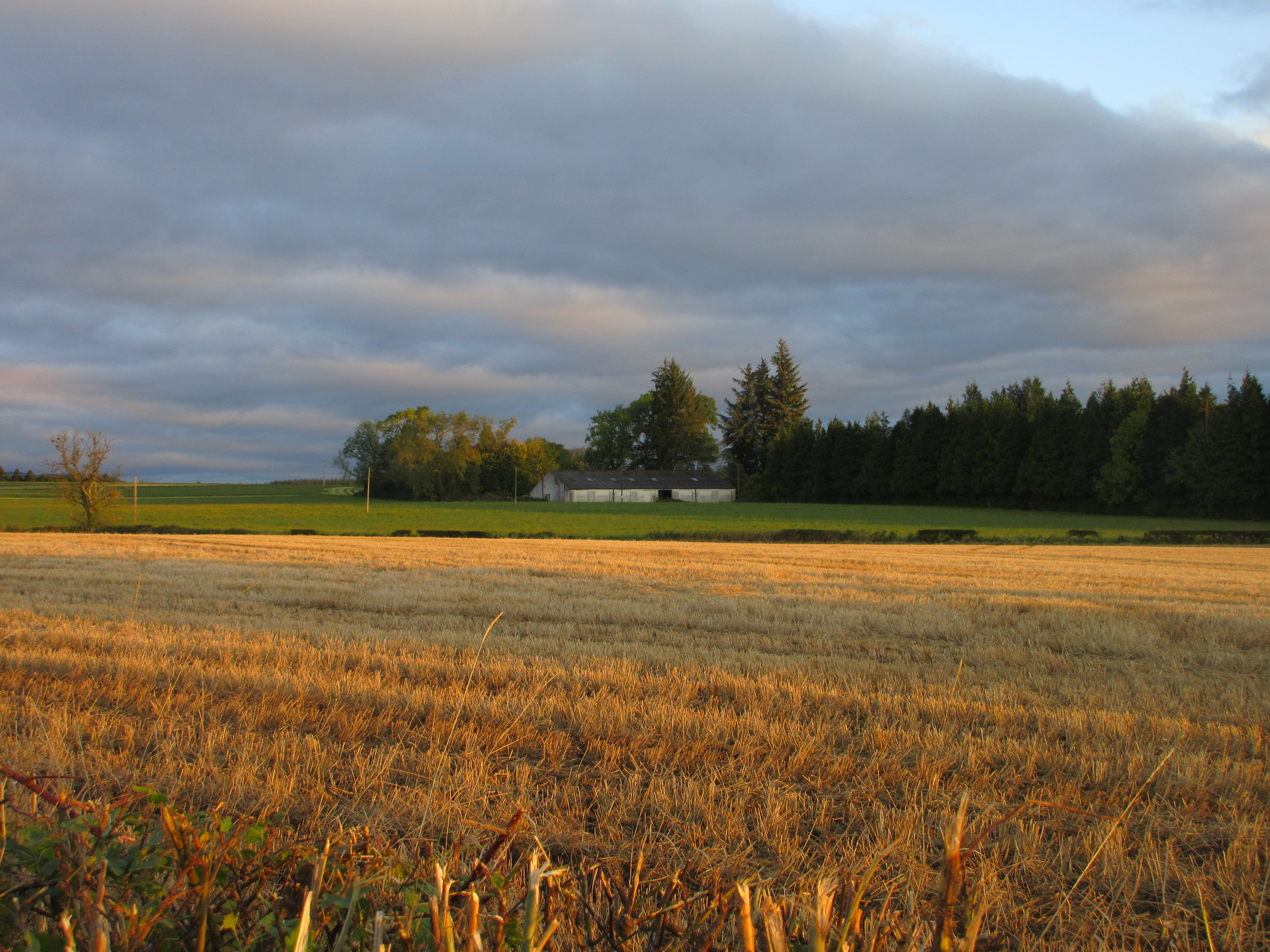
- Fields north of Methven
| Date | 19 June 1306 |
| Location | Methven, west of Perth |
| Result | English victory |

Belligerents
| Kingdom of Scotland | Kingdom of England |

Commanders and leaders
| King Robert I | Earl of Pembroke |

Strength
| Around 2,500 | 2,171 English plus Scots loyal to Edward I (Note: The English payroll allowed for 50 knights, 21 squires, 140 crossbowmen and 1,960 archers. They were reinforced by Scots lords loyal to Edward I.) |

Casualties and losses
| Heavy | Light |

The Battle of Methven took place at Methven, Scotland on 19 June 1306, during the Wars of Scottish Independence. The battlefield was researched to be included in the Inventory of Historic Battlefields in Scotland and protected by Historic Scotland under the Scottish Historical Environment Policy of 2009, but was excluded due to the uncertainty of its location.

== Background ==
Bruce was crowned King of Scots by Bishop William de Lamberton at Scone, near Perth, on Palm Sunday (25 March 1306).

Enraged by the killing of John Comyn, Lord of Badenoch by Bruce and his followers at Dumfries and Bruce's coronation, Edward I of England named Aymer de Valence, Earl of Pembroke, special lieutenant for Scotland. Pembroke moved quickly, and by the middle of summer he had made his base at Perth, along with Henry Percy and Robert Clifford with an army of about 3000 men drawn from the northern counties. Edward I gave orders that no mercy was to be granted and all taken in arms were to be executed without trial.

== Battle ==
It is possible that the order of "no mercy" had not reached King Robert because he resorted to a chivalric tradition and called on de Valence to come out from the walls of Perth and do battle. De Valence, who had the misplaced reputation of an honourable man, made the excuse that it was too late in the day to do battle and said he would accept the challenge on the following day. The king bivouacked his army some six miles away in some woods that were on high ground near the River Almond. At about dusk as the Bruce's army made camp and many disarmed, the army of de Valence fell upon them in a surprise attack.

The king unhorsed the Earl of Pembroke in the first onslaught but was unhorsed himself and nearly captured by Sir Philip Mowbray only to be saved by Sir Christopher Seton. Outnumbered and taken by surprise, the king's force had no chance. Bruce was twice more unhorsed and twice more rescued. At the last, a small force of Scottish knights including James Douglas, Neil Campbell, Edward Bruce, John de Strathbogie, Earl of Atholl, Gilbert de Haye and the king formed a phalanx to break free and were forced to flee in a shattering defeat, leaving many of the king's most loyal followers dead or soon to be executed.

The battle is depicted in the Netflix original film Outlaw King.

== Aftermath ==
Those captured during the battle included Alexander Fraser, David de Inchmartin, Hugh de Haye, John Somerville, Alexander Scrymgeour, the royal standard bearer, Thomas de Randolph, Bruce's nephew and Hugh, Bruce's chaplain.
