= 1510s in Scotland =

Events from the 1510s in Scotland.

== Incumbents ==
- Monarch – James IV

== Events ==
- 12 October 1511 – James IV's great ship, the Michael, is launched at the new dockyard at Newhaven, Edinburgh; she is the largest ship afloat at this date.
- 1511 – Battle of Knock Mary followed by Massacre of Monzievaird.
- 1512 – St Leonard's College, St Andrews, founded

== Births ==
- 10 April 1512 – James V of Scotland (died 1542)

== Deaths ==
- 2 August 1511 – Sir Andrew Barton, High Admiral and privateer, killed in battle in The Downs (b. c.1466)
- 15 September 1512 – John Stewart, 1st Earl of Atholl, peer (born 1440)

== See also ==
- Timeline of Scottish history
