= 1300s in England =

Events from the 1300s in the Kingdom of England.

== Incumbents ==
- Monarch – Edward I (to 7 July 1307), then Edward II

== Events ==
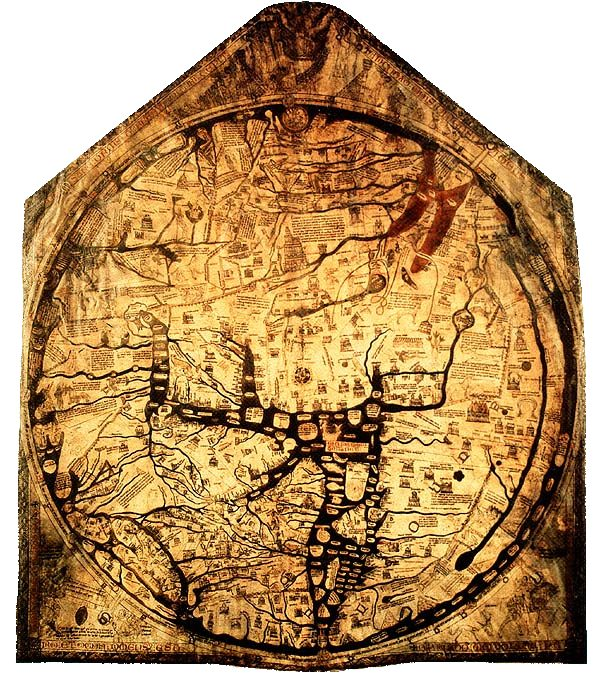
The Hereford Mappa Mundi

1300

- 10 March – Wardrobe accounts of King Edward I of England ("Edward Longshanks") include a reference to a game called creag being played at the town of Newenden in Kent. It is generally agreed that creag is an early form of cricket.
- 28 March – Edward I agrees to the issuing of "Articles of the Charters", establishing punishments for infringing the Magna Carta.
- April – sterling confirmed as the only official coin of the realm; Royal mint moved to the Tower of London.
- 10 October – First War of Scottish Independence: At the urging of the Pope, Edward I makes a temporary truce with Scotland.
- Approximate date – the Hereford Mappa Mundi is prepared in Hereford Cathedral.

1301

- 7 February – Edward of Caernarvon (later King Edward II of England) becomes the first English Prince of Wales.
- First War of Scottish Independence: England secures control of Scotland south of the River Forth.

1302

- 26 January – Robert the Bruce makes a truce with Edward I.

1303

- 1 February – Edward I issues the Carta Mercatoria, allowing foreign merchants free entry and departure with their goods.
- 24 February – First War of Scottish Independence: Scottish victory at the Battle of Roslin.
- 20 May – Treaty of Paris restores Gascony to England from France.
- Winter – Wars of Scottish Independence: Edward I resumes his campaign against William Wallace and others in Scotland, holding court in Dunfermline Abbey.
- Approximate date – the Avoirdupois system of weights and measures comes into use.

1304

- February – John "Red" Comyn, Lord of Badenoch, negotiates a peace with England in the Wars of Scottish Independence at Strathord near Perth.
- March – Scottish Parliament submits to English rule.
- 20 July – fall of Stirling Castle: Edward I takes the last rebel stronghold in the Wars of Scottish Independence.

1305

- 5 August – William Wallace, leader of the resistance to the English occupation of Scotland, is handed over to English troops.
- 23 August – Wallace hanged, drawn and quartered in London following a treason trial in Westminster Hall.
- September – Edward I issues ordinances for the government of Scotland.
- Edward I issues the first commission of Trailbaston.

1306

- 1 February – Pope Clement V confirms Ralph Baldock as Bishop of London.
- May – Hugh the younger Despenser, favourite of Edward, Prince of Wales, is married to heiress Eleanor de Clare.
- May – great festival at Westminster to celebrate the knighthood of Edward of Caernarvon.
- 19 June – forces of Earl of Pembroke defeat Bruce's Scottish rebels at the Battle of Methven.
- In London, a city ordinance decrees that heating with coal is forbidden when parliament is in session. The ordinance is not particularly effective.
- Completion of Wells Cathedral chapter house, in Decorated Gothic style.

1307

- January – Statute of Carlisle forbids religious foundations from sending money to their mother houses abroad.
- 13 March – Walter de Stapledon is appointed Bishop of Exeter.
- 10 May – Battle of Loudon Hill: Scottish forces under Robert the Bruce defeat an English army.
- 7 July – Edward I dies at Burgh by Sands in the far northwest of England while campaigning against the Scots. By 11 July word reaches Edward II in London that he has succeeded his father as King of England.
- 6 August – Edward II's alleged lover Piers Gaveston is made Earl of Cornwall.

1308

- 9–11 January – Knights Templar arrested in England; Edward II appropriates their lands.
- 25 January – King Edward II marries Isabella of France (aged about 12) at Boulogne-sur-Mer.
- 25 February – coronation of King Edward II at Westmister Abbey.
- April – Keldholme Priory election dispute begins in Yorkshire.
- 18 May – Edward forced to banish Piers Gaveston by his barons.

1309

- 27 July – Parliament allows Gaveston to return in exchange for an agreement to reform the royal administration.
- Sumptuary law attempts to curb conspicuous consumption of food by the nobility.
- Alnwick Castle, Northumberland, bought by the Percy family, later Earls of Northumberland.

== Births ==
1300

- 1 June – Thomas of Brotherton, 1st Earl of Norfolk, son of Edward I of England (died 1338)
- Laurence Minot, poet (died 1352)

1301

- 5 August – Edmund of Woodstock, 1st Earl of Kent, politician (died 1330)
- 24 September – Ralph Stafford, 1st Earl of Stafford, soldier (died 1372)
- William Montacute, 1st Earl of Salisbury, nobleman (died 1344)

1304

- William de Clinton, Earl of Huntingdon

1307

- John Arderne, surgeon (died 1392)

== Deaths ==
1302

- 9 March – Richard FitzAlan, 8th Earl of Arundel (born 1267)

1304

- 27 September – John de Warenne, 6th Earl of Surrey, English soldier

1305

- 23 August – William Wallace (born c. 1270 in Scotland)

1306

- Roger Bigod, 5th Earl of Norfolk (born 1270)

1307

- 7 April – Joan of Acre, daughter of King Edward I of England (born 1271)
- 7 July – King Edward I of England (born 1239)
