= 1310s in England =

Events from the 1310s in England.

== Incumbents ==
- Monarch – Edward II

== Events ==
- 1310
  - 16 March – King Edward II agrees to the election of a committee of twenty-one barons as "Lord Ordainers" to reform the government.
  - October – English army raids southern Scotland, but fails to reach the north.
  - The first purpose-built accommodation for students (Mob Quad) completed in Merton College, Oxford.
- 1311
  - 29 July – remaining Knights Templar in England are dispersed to do penance.
  - 16 August – Parliament presents the Ordinances of 1311 to the King (document dated 5 October; published on 11 October); these substitute the Lord Ordainers for the King as the effective government of the country.
  - Scottish forces under Robert the Bruce raid Northumberland and burn Corbridge.
  - Bolingbroke Castle passes to the House of Lancaster.
  - Completion of Lincoln Cathedral; with the spire reaching around 525 feet (160 m), it becomes the world's tallest structure (surpassing the Great Pyramid of Giza, which held the record for almost 4,000 years), a record it holds until the spire is blown down in 1549.
  - Construction of Melbourne Castle begins.
- 1312
  - 13 January – royal favourite Piers Gaveston, having returned from two months exile on the continent, is reunited, probably at Knaresborough Castle, with Edward II, who on 18 January restores all Gaveston's confiscated lands to him. Edward moves his court to York and prepares to fight rebellious barons.
  - c. March – the barons, meeting in London, where Gaveston is excommunicated by the Archbishop of Canterbury, plan to capture Gaveston and prevent him from fleeing to Scotland.
  - 4 May – Edward, Isabella and Gaveston are at Newcastle upon Tyne, pursued by Thomas, 2nd Earl of Lancaster and his followers. The royal party flee by ship and land at Scarborough, where Gaveston (with some royal treasure) stays while Edward and Isabella return to York.
  - 19 May – After a 2-week siege of Scarborough Castle, Gaveston surrenders to the earls of Pembroke and Surrey, on the promise that he would not be harmed.
  - 19 June – Lancaster orders the execution of Gaveston, which is carried out in Warwickshire.
  - 22 December – Lancaster and his supporters refuse an offer of pardon from Edward II.
  - Scottish forces under Robert the Bruce raid as far as Durham.
  - Walter of Guisborough writes Cronica, a history of England from 1066.
- 1313
  - 13 January – Robert the Bruce expels English troops from Perth, Scotland.
  - 20 May – Ordinance of the Staple establishes specific depots through which the English wool trade to Europe must pass.
  - 28 May – Thomas Cobham elected to the Archbishopric of Canterbury.
  - 1 October – Pope Clement V dismisses the election of Thomas Cobham to the Archbishopric of Canterbury having been petitioned to do so by King Edward II. Walter Reynolds enthroned as the Archbishop.
  - 13 October – Statute forbidding Bearing of Armour prohibits coming armed to Parliament.
  - October – Edward II pardons rebellious barons after they publicly apologise.
  - Robert the Bruce retakes the Isle of Man from the English.
- 1314
  - 4 April – Exeter College, Oxford founded by Walter de Stapledon, Bishop of Exeter.
  - May – English forces enter Scotland intending to break the Scottish siege of Stirling Castle.
  - 24 June – Battle of Bannockburn: Scottish forces led by Robert the Bruce defeat Edward II of England, securing de facto independence for Scotland. Stirling Castle is surrendered to the Scots, who raid England as far south as Yorkshire.
  - June–September – Welsh revolt in Glamorgan.
  - Completion of Old St Paul's Cathedral in London.
  - Ban on the playing of violent ball games (precursors of football) is instituted and widely ignored.
- 1315
  - February – Earl of Lancaster takes control of administration, removing the last of the King's supporters from the Royal Council.
  - 26 May – opening of Bruce campaign in Ireland by Edward Bruce, partly intended to create a second front in the First War of Scottish Independence against England.
  - 25 October – Adam Banastre, Henry de Lea and William Bradshaw attack Liverpool Castle.
  - The Borough of Liverpool, along with Liverpool Castle, is granted to Robert de Holland.
  - Widespread famine after heavy rain destroys the harvest; lasts until 1317.
- 1316
  - 28 January – Welsh revolt against English rule in Glamorgan led by Llywelyn Bren breaks out with an attack on Caerphilly Castle.
  - February – Earl of Lancaster becomes Chief Councillor to Edward II, who confirms the Ordinances of 1311.
  - 18 March – Llywelyn Bren surrenders to Humphrey de Bohun, Earl of Hereford, at Ystradfellte.
- 1317
  - April – Baron Roger Mortimer, newly appointed Justiciar of Ireland drives Scottish raiders back to the north of Ireland.
  - Hugh Despenser the Younger has Llywelyn Bren hanged, drawn and quartered at Cardiff Castle without authority.
- 1318
  - 8 April – Berwick-upon-Tweed is retaken by the Scottish from the English.
  - 9 August – Treaty of Leake between Edward II and Earl of Lancaster, agreeing on control of administration.
  - 14 October – Anglo-Irish forces defeat a Scots-Irish army at the Battle of Faughart in Ireland. Edward Bruce, brother of Robert the Bruce, is killed in the battle.
- 1319
  - 20 September
    - A siege of Berwick-upon-Tweed to recapture it from the Scottish occupation is abandoned.
    - First War of Scottish Independence: Scottish victory at the Battle of Myton.

== Births ==
- 1310/15
  - 24 June – Philippa of Hainault, Queen consort of Edward III of England (died 1369)
- 1310
  - 29 November – John de Mowbray, 3rd Baron Mowbray (died 1361)
- 1312
  - 13 November – King Edward III of England (died 1377)
  - Approximate date – William de Bohun, 1st Earl of Northampton, military leader (died 1360)
- 1313
  - 20 July – John Tiptoft, 2nd Baron Tibetot (died 1367)
- 1318
  - 8 June – Eleanor of Woodstock, eldest daughter of King Edward II of England, Duchess consort of Guelders (died 1355)
  - 11 September – Eleanor of Lancaster, noblewoman (died 1372)
  - Approximate date – Michael de Poynings, 1st Baron Poynings, knight (died 1369)
- 1319
  - 20 March – Laurence Hastings, 1st Earl of Pembroke (died 1348)

== Deaths ==
- 1311
  - 3 March – Antony Bek, bishop of Durham (born c. 1245)
- 1312
  - 19 June – Piers Gaveston, favourite of Edward II of England (born c. 1284)
- 1313
  - 11 May – Robert Winchelsey, Archbishop of Canterbury (born c. 1245)
  - John Schorne, rector of North Marston in the county of Buckinghamshire (year of birth unknown)
- 1314 – killed during English defeat at the Battle of Bannockburn
  - Henry de Bohun, killed by Robert the Bruce
  - Gilbert de Clare, 8th Earl of Gloucester (born 1291)
  - Robert de Clifford, 1st Baron de Clifford (born 1274)
- 1315
  - 10 August – Guy de Beauchamp, 10th Earl of Warwick, nobleman (year of birth unknown)
- 1316
  - 5 May – Elizabeth of Rhuddlan, daughter of King Edward I (born 1282)
- 1318
  - 14 February – Marguerite of France, queen of Edward I of England (born c.1279)
