= 1320s in England =

Events from the 1320s in England.

== Incumbents ==
- Monarch – Edward II (to 25 January 1327), then Edward III

== Events ==
- 1320
  - 18 February – Walter Stapledon, Bishop of Exeter, is appointed as Lord High Treasurer.
  - 4 June – the King appoints Lord Pembroke as keeper of the realm before traveling to France.
  - Many horses die of a disease called "Ffarsine".
- 1321
  - 19 January – Edward II appoints the Archbishop of York; the Bishops of Carlisle, Worcester, and Winchester; the Earls of Pembroke, Hereford and Badlesmere; and six other people to negotiate with the Kingdom of Scotland for a final peace treaty or an extension of the Pembroke treaty of 1319 before its expiration on Christmas Day.
  - 20 January – Parliament appoints a commission to inquire into illegal confederacies against the King.
  - 30 January – the Earls of Hereford, Arundel and Surrey, and 26 other people, are forbidden from attending any meetings to discuss matters affecting the King.
  - May – Marcher lords seize the lands of Hugh Despenser the Elder.
  - 28 June – Thomas, 2nd Earl of Lancaster (a cousin of the king) holds an assembly at Sherburn in Elmet demanding administrative reforms and denouncing Hugh le Despenser.
  - 15 July – the "Parliament of Whitebands" convenes with only 38 barons present, to remove suspect counsellors to the King.
  - 14 August – Edward II is forced to banish his most loyal baron, Hugh Despenser the Elder, and his son, Hugh the younger.
  - 31 October – the King's forces capture Leeds Castle in Kent after Margaret de Clare, wife of the absent Bartholomew Badlesmere, refuses Queen Isabella admittance. When the Queen seeks to force an entry, Lady Badlesmere instructs her archers to shoot at Isabella and her party, six of whom are killed. After Edward occupies the castle, Lady Badlesmere becomes the first woman ever to be imprisoned in the Tower of London.
  - 8 December – confronting the rebellion of Thomas of Lancaster, the Baron Badlesmere and Roger Mortimer, the King arrives in Cirencester, then leads troops up the Severn Valley from Gloucester against the Contrariant rebels.
  - 26 December – faced with an invasion of London during the rebellion by troops led by Baron Badlesmere, the King offers safe conduct for any rebels who come over to the royalist side, but orders the Sheriff of Gloucester to arrest Badlesmere.
  - Construction of the Lady Chapel at Ely Cathedral begins.
  - First recorded tower clock in England constructed, at Norwich Cathedral.
  - Famine recurs.
- 1322
  - 12/13 February – the central tower of Ely Cathedral collapses.
  - 10 March – "Despenser War": Battle of Burton Bridge – Edward II orders an attack on the fortified positions of the Contrariant army under his cousin Thomas of Lancaster at Walton-on-Trent in Staffordshire. Thomas is heavily outnumbered and decides to withdraw, but is pursued by Edward's troops. He escapes with the remnants of his army to Tutbury Castle and evades Edward's patrols to cross the flooded River Dove. Finally, Thomas makes his way northwards.
  - 16 March – "Despenser War": Battle of Boroughbridge – Royal forces (some 4,000 men) led by Andrew Harclay defeat the Contrariant barons at Boroughbridge in Yorkshire. During the battle, Harclay holds the bridge against fierce rebel attacks and Thomas of Lancaster is forced to surrender.
  - 22 March – after a show trial at Pontefract Castle, and his conviction by a tribunal for treason against the crown, Thomas of Lancaster is publicly beheaded.
  - 14 April – Baron Badlesmere, another leader of the unsuccessful Contrariant attempt to overthrow the king, is found guilty of treason at a trial in Canterbury. His death sentence is carried out later in the day.
  - 26 June – Alice de Lacy, Countess of Lincoln, widow of the Contrariant leader Thomas of Lancaster, surrenders almost all of her properties to King Edward II in order to avoid execution.
  - 20 September – Scotland's King Robert the Bruce begins his "Great Raid" on sites in northern England, leading troops across the River Tweed and starting with an attack on Norham Castle. Edward II responds with an order directing the English Army to assemble at Newcastle upon Tyne to make a counterattack.
  - 14 October – First War of Scottish Independence: Battle of Old Byland – Robert the Bruce of Scotland defeats English troops near Byland Abbey in North Yorkshire. Edward II narrowly escapes capture and is forced to abandon his personal equipment, silver plate, jewelry and horse trappings. He flees with his retinue to Bridlington. In November, Robert the Bruce withdraws his troops from England.
  - 3 November – Margaret de Clare, widow of the Contrariant Baron Baldesmere, is freed from imprisonment in the Tower of London and retires to a religious life at the London convent of the Minorite Sisters (later known as the Poor Clares).
- 1323
  - 30 May – Edward II makes a 13-year truce with the Kingdom of Scotland.
  - 24–30 October – Edward II stays at Liverpool Castle.
  - Walter Stapledon conducts a major re-organisation of government records and financial rolls.
  - Northallerton Free School founded.
- 1324
  - August – War of Saint-Sardos: France invades Gascony.
  - Franciscan friar and philosopher William of Ockham is summoned from Oxford to the Papal court at Avignon; either at this time or by 1328 he comes into conflict with Pope John XXII and never returns to England.
  - Monarch's right to royal fish recognised by statute.
- 1325
  - 9 March – Edward II's wife, Isabella of France, travels to France to negotiate a truce with Charles IV of France.
  - 24 September – Edward of Windsor goes to France to pay homage for Gascony, and remains there with his mother.
- 1326
  - 19 January – Roger de Beler, a Baron of the Exchequer, is murdered by the Folville gang.
  - 27 August – Isabella of France arranges the betrothal of Edward of Windsor to Philippa of Hainault in return for military support in her planned invasion of England.
  - 24 September – an army led by Isabella and Roger Mortimer lands in Suffolk.
  - 2 October – Edward II flees to Gloucester.
  - 15 October – Walter Stapledon, Bishop of Exeter and Lord High Treasurer, is murdered by the mob in London.
  - 27 October – Hugh Despenser the Elder is hanged, drawn and quartered at Bristol.
  - 16 November – Edward II captured at Neath Abbey.
  - 24 November – Hugh Despenser the Younger is hanged, drawn and quartered at Hereford.
  - Richard of Wallingford constructs a great public clock at St. Albans.
  - Probable foundation of Hanley Castle Grammar School in Worcestershire.
  - Walter de Milemete produces the first known text to include an illustration of a cannon, his De Officiis Regum, written to educate Prince Edward.
- 1327
  - 7 January–9 March – Parliament of 1327, sitting at the Palace of Westminster, is instrumental in the transfer of the crown.
  - January – outbreak of rioting against monastic establishments in St Albans and Bury St Edmunds; extends to Abingdon in April.
  - 20 January – Edward II, incarcerated at Kenilworth Castle, is forced to abdicate by his estranged wife, Queen Isabella, and her lover, Roger Mortimer. This is announced in London on 24 January.
  - 25 January – the 14-year-old Edward III is proclaimed King in London in place of his father, Edward II. His mother Isabella and Mortimer rule as regents.
  - 1 February – coronation of Edward III at Westminster Abbey by Walter Reynolds, Archbishop of Canterbury.
  - 31 March – Charles IV of France (Isabella's brother) makes peace with Edward III, returning the duchies of Aquitaine and Gascony to English control.
  - 5 April – Edward II is moved to Berkeley Castle in Gloucestershire where he is kept under the custody of Roger Mortimer's son-in-law, Thomas Berkeley, and John Maltravers. Some chroniclers claim Edward is mistreated by his captors.
  - 4 August – First War of Scottish Independence: Weardale campaign – Scottish forces defeat the English (led by Roger Mortimer and the young king) at the Battle of Stanhope Park in County Durham.
  - 10 August – John Grandisson is nominated as Bishop of Exeter (consecrated 18 October); he will serve for more than forty years.
  - 21 September – death of Edward II at Berkeley Castle, probably murdered. This is announced in London on 23 September.
  - 11 December – Simon Mepeham is elected as the new Archbishop of Canterbury as the candidate of the Earl of Lancaster, leader of the regency council. Mepeham defeats the candidate supported by Queen Isabella and Roger Mortimer, and soon works with King Edward III to end Mortimer's power.
  - 20 December – Edward II is buried in Gloucester Abbey (where his body was moved on 21 October) in a grand ceremony attended by the new king.
  - Abbot Richard of Wallingford describes the construction of an astronomical clock in his Tractatus Horologii Astronomici.
- 1328
  - 24 January – marriage of Edward III to Philippa of Hainault at York Minster.
  - 1 May – by the Treaty of Edinburgh-Northampton, England recognises Scotland as an independent nation after the Wars of Scottish Independence.
  - 5 June – Simon Mepeham enthroned as Archbishop of Canterbury.
  - 17 July – Edward III's sister Joan marries David Bruce, son of the Scottish King.
  - October – Mortimer proclaims himself Earl of March.
  - William of Ockham flees Avignon and seeks refuge with the Holy Roman Emperor Louis IV of Bavaria.
  - Reconstruction of Exeter Cathedral in the Decorated Gothic style begins.
  - A storm surge on the Suffolk coast chokes the harbour of Dunwich and sweeps away the village of Newton.
  - St. Catherine's Oratory lighthouse on the Isle of Wight is completed.
- 1329
  - Establishment of the predecessor of The King's School, Grantham.
  - Establishment of Kilve Chantry in Somerset.

== Births ==
- 1320
  - John Twenge, prior of Bridlington, canonized (died 1379)
  - Approximate date –
    - John Chandos, knight (died 1369)
    - John Hawkwood, mercenary (died 1394)
    - William of Wykeham, Bishop of Winchester (died 1404)
- 1323
  - 30 October – Lady Seraphia Greystone of Yorkshire (died 1399)
- 1328
  - 25 June – William de Montacute, 2nd Earl of Salisbury, military leader (died 1397)
  - 29 September – Joan of Kent, wife of Edward, the Black Prince (died 1385)
  - 11 November – Roger Mortimer, 2nd Earl of March (died 1360)
- 1329
  - 19 May – William Ros, 3rd Baron Ros (died 1352)

== Deaths ==
- 1321
  - 9 November – Walter Langton, Bishop of Lichfield and treasurer of England
- 1322
  - 16 March – Humphrey de Bohun, 4th Earl of Hereford, soldier, killed in action (born 1276)
  - 22 March – Thomas, 2nd Earl of Lancaster, rebel leader, executed (born 1278)
  - 14 April – Bartholomew Badlesmere, 1st Baron Badlesmere, soldier, executed (born 1275)
  - 3 December – Maud Chaworth, Countess of Leicester (born 1282)
- 1323
  - 3 March – Andrew Harclay, 1st Earl of Carlisle, military leader, executed (born c. 1276)
- 1324
  - 23 June – Aymer de Valence, 2nd Earl of Pembroke (born c. 1275)
  - 1 November – John de Halton, Bishop of Carlisle (year of birth unknown)
- 1326
  - 14 October – Walter Stapledon, Bishop of Exeter and Lord High Treasurer, murdered (born 1261)
  - 27 October – Hugh Despenser the Elder, chief adviser to Edward II, executed (born 1261)
  - 17 November – Edmund Fitzalan, 2nd Earl of Arundel, politician, executed (born 1285)
  - 24 November – Hugh Despenser the Younger, knight, executed (born 1286)
- 1327
  - 24 June – James Berkeley, Bishop of Exeter
  - 21 September – King Edward II of England (born 1284)
  - 16 November – Walter Reynolds, Archbishop of Canterbury
