= 1330s =

Decade

The 1330s was a decade of the Julian Calendar which began on January 1, 1330, and ended on December 31, 1339.

== Events ==
=== 1330 ===
==== January–December ====
- July 28 – Battle of Velbazhd: The Bulgarians under Tsar Michael Shishman (who is mortally wounded) are beaten by the Serbs. Bulgaria does not lose any territory to Serbia, but is powerless to stop the Serbian advance towards the predominantly Bulgarian-populated Macedonia.
- October 19 – King Edward III of England starts his personal reign, arresting his regent Roger Mortimer, and having him executed.
- November 9–12 – Battle of Posada: The Wallachians, under Basarab I, defeat the Hungarians, though heavily outnumbered, thus making a firm statement towards the independence of Wallachia.
- December 6 – The British Isles are hit by a great storm, creating large areas of sand dunes on Anglesey.
- Undated – Vilnius, Lithuania receives its coat-of-arms, granted to the city in the seventh year of its existence.
- Undated – Ivan Alexander becomes the despot of Lovech.

=== 1331 ===
==== September–December ====
- September 8 – Stefan Dušan declares himself king of Serbia.
- September 27 – Battle of Płowce: The German Teutonic Knights and the Poles battle to a draw.

==== Date unknown ====
- The Sieges of Cividale del Friuli and Alicante begin.
- The Genkō War begins in Japan.
- Ibn Battuta visits Kilwa.
- The first recorded outbreak of the Black Death occurs, in the Chinese province of Hebei.

=== 1332 ===
- February 18 – Amda Seyon I, Emperor of Ethiopia, begins his campaigns in the southern Muslim provinces (possibly in 1329).
- August 10–11 – Battle of Dupplin Moor: Edward Balliol rebels, and the English defeat the loyalists of David II in Scotland.
- September – Edward Balliol crowns himself King of Scotland.
- November 7 – Lucerne joins the Swiss Confederation with Uri, Schwyz, and Unterwalden.
- December 16 – Battle of Annan: The loyalists of David II defeat Edward Balliol in Scotland.
- The city of Marosvásárhely (in Transylvania, today Târgu Mureș in Romania) is first documented in the papal registry, under the name Novum Forum Siculorum.

=== 1333 ===
==== January–December ====
- May 18 – Siege of Kamakura in Japan: Forces loyal to Emperor Go-Daigo, led by Nitta Yoshisada, enter and destroy the city, breaking the power of the Hōjō clan over the Kamakura shogunate. The Kamakura period ends, and the Kenmu Restoration under Go-Daigo begins.
- June 6 – William Donn de Burgh, 3rd Earl of Ulster, is murdered as part of the Burke Civil War in Ireland.
- June 8 – King Edward III of England seizes the Isle of Man from Scottish control.
- June 19 – Ashikaga Takauji leads his army into Kyoto as part of the Kenmu Restoration.
- July 7 – The reign of Emperor Kōgon of Japan, first of the Northern Court (Ashikaga) Pretenders, ends.
- July 19 – Wars of Scottish Independence - Battle of Halidon Hill: Edward III of England decisively defeats Sir Archibald Douglas. Berwick-upon-Tweed returns to English control.
- November 4 – The River Arno floods, causing massive damage in Florence, as recorded by Giovanni Villani.

==== Date unknown ====
- A famine (lasting until 1337) breaks out in China, killing six million.
- A great famine takes place in Southern Europe. It is known to historians of Catalonia as Lo mal any primer, "the First Bad Year" (equivalent to the Great Famine of 1315–1317 further north), an early notice of the catastrophes of the second half of this century.
- Jan IV of Dražic, Bishop of Prague, founds a friary and builds a stone bridge at Roudnice in Bohemia.
- The Kapellbrücke wooden bridge over the Reuss in Lucerne (Switzerland) is built; by the 20th century it will be the world's oldest truss bridge and Europe's oldest covered bridge.
- The Venetian historian Marino Sanudo Torsello publishes his History of the realm of Romania (Istoria del regno di Romania), one of the most important sources on the history of Latin Greece.

=== 1334 ===
==== January–December ====
- July 18 – The bishop of Florence blesses the first foundational stone laid for the new campanile (bell tower) of the Florence Cathedral (the tower was designed by the artist Giotto di Bondone).
- December 30 – Pope Benedict XII succeeds Pope John XXII, as the 197th pope.

==== Date unknown ====
- Autumn – Battle of Adramyttion: A Christian league defeats the fleet of the Turkish Beylik of Karasi.

=== 1335 ===
==== January–December ====
- May 2 – Otto the Merry, Duke of Austria, becomes Duke of Carinthia.
- July 30 – Battle of Boroughmuir: John Randolph, 3rd Earl of Moray defeats Guy, Count of Namur in Scotland.
- November 30 – Battle of Culblean: David Bruce defeats Edward Balliol in Scotland.
- December 1 – Abu Sa'id Bahadur Khan dies, a victim of the plague that ravages the Ilkhanate. This is an early outbreak of the Black Death. His death without a clear heir causes the Ilkhanate to disintegrate.
- October 22 – Ex-emperor Hanazono (95th emperor of japan) becomes a Zen priest.

==== Date unknown ====
- Georgians under King George V (the Brilliant) finally defeat the Mongolians in a decisive battle. After that George V returns the Grave of Christ from the Muslims.
- Slavery is abolished in Sweden.
- Congress of Visegrád: The monarchs of Bohemia, Hungary, and Poland form an anti-Habsburg alliance.
- Carinthia and Carniola come under Habsburg rule. After the death of Duke Henry, the duchies are bestowed by Louis the Bavarian on the Dukes of Austria. From that time onwards, what is today Slovenia is ruled jointly with Austria until 1918.
- Pope Benedict XII begins to reform the Cistercians.
- The excommunication of Frederick III of Sicily and the interdict placed on Sicily end.
- Construction begins on the papal palace in Avignon.
- Aabenraa is chartered as a city.
- The School of Arts in Zaragoza, Spain is founded (later known as the University of Zaragoza in the 16th Century).

=== 1336 ===
- February 25
  - Rather than be taken captive by the Teutonic Knights, 4,000 defenders of Pilėnai, Lithuania commit mass suicide.
  - The Kenmu Restoration ends and the Muromachi period begins in Japan; start of the Nanboku-chō period.
- April 18 (unconfirmed) – Brothers Harihara and Bukka Raya found the Vijayanagara Empire on the southern part of the Deccan Plateau in South India.
- April 26 – The Ascent of Mount Ventoux is made by the Italian poet Petrarch: he claims to be the first since classical antiquity to climb a mountain for the view.
- May 19 – The governor of Baghdad, Oirat 'Ali Padsah, defeats Arpa Ke'un near Maraga, contributing to the disintegration of the Ilkhanate.
- July 4 – Battle of Minatogawa: Ashikaga Takauji defeats Japanese Imperial forces, under Kusunoki Masashige and Nitta Yoshisada.
- July 21–22 – Second War of Scottish Independence: Aberdeen, Scotland is burned by the English.
- September 20 – The reign of Emperor Kōmyō, second of the Ashikaga Pretenders to the Northern Court of Japan, begins.

=== 1337 ===
==== January–December ====
- March 16 – Edward, the Black Prince establishes the Duchy of Cornwall, becoming the first English Duke.
- May 24 – Philip VI of France confiscates Gascony from English control.
- August – Second War of Scottish Independence: English forces relieve Stirling Castle, ending Edward III of England's last campaign in Scotland.
- October – Hundred Years' War: Edward III of England formally rejects Philip VI's claim to the French throne, initiating hostilities between France and England.
- November – Battle of Cadzand: English troops raid the Flemish island of Cadzand.

==== Date unknown ====
- Bisham Priory is founded in England.
- The Scaligeri Family loses control of Padua; Alberto della Scala, patron of the music of the Trecento, moves to Verona.
- Petrarch, "father" of Renaissance humanism, first visits Rome to wander its mysterious ruins, with an eye for aesthetics as well as for history, exciting a renewed interest in Classical civilisation.
- The Sofia Psalter is produced in Bulgaria.
- The Despotate of Epirus is conquered by the Byzantine Empire.
- The famine in China, which had lasted since 1332 and killed 6,000,000, comes to an end.

=== 1338 ===
- October 5 – Hundred Years' War, English Channel naval campaign: Southampton is destroyed.

==== Date unknown ====
- Hundred Years' War: Louis IV, Holy Roman Emperor appoints Edward III of England as a vicar-general of the Holy Roman Empire. Louis supports Edward's claim to the French throne, under the terms of the Treaty of Koblenz.
- Philip VI of France besieges Guienne in Southwest France, and his navy attacks Portsmouth, England.
- Ashikaga Takauji is granted the title of shōgun by the emperor of Japan, starting the Ashikaga Shogunate.
- Nicomedia is captured by the Ottoman Empire.
- A Black Death plague strain originates near Lake Issyk-Kul in modern Kyrgyzstan, according to Syriac tombstone inscriptions and genetic material from exhumed bodies.

=== 1339 ===
==== January–December ====
- June – Battle of Laupen: The Canton of Bern defeats the forces of Fribourg.
- September 18 – Emperor Go-Murakami accedes to the throne of Japan.
- September 24 (or 28) – Simone Boccanegra is elected, as the first Doge of Genoa.

==== Date unknown ====
- Shams-ud-Din Shah Mir, having defeated Kota Rani, Hindu queen regnant of Kashmir, in battle at Jayapur (modern Sumbal), asks her to marry him, but she commits suicide rather than do so; thus he takes over sole rule of Kashmir, beginning the Muslim Shah Mir Dynasty.
- All streets in the city of Florence are paved, the first European city in post-Roman times where this has happened.
- The Moscow Kremlin is first referred to as a kremlin.

== Births ==
1330

- June 15 – Edward, the Black Prince, son of Edward III of England (d. 1376)
- July 4 – Ashikaga Yoshiakira, Japanese shōgun (d. 1367)
- October 25 – Louis II of Flanders (d. 1384)
- date unknown
  - Frans Ackerman, Flemish statesman (d. 1387)
  - Euphemia of Sicily, princess regent of Sicily (d. 1359)
  - Altichiero, Italian painter (d. 1390)
  - Nicolas Flamel, French scribe and manuscript-seller, reputed alchemist (d. 1417)
  - John Gower, English poet (d. 1410)

1331

- February 16 – Coluccio Salutati, Florentine political leader (d. 1406)
- April 14 – Jeanne-Marie de Maille, French Roman Catholic saint (b. 1414)
- April 30 – Gaston III, Count of Foix (d. 1391)
- October 4 – James Butler, 2nd Earl of Ormonde (d. 1382)
- date unknown
  - Hamidüddin Aksarayî, Ottoman teacher of Islam (d. 1412)
  - Blanche d'Évreux, queen consort of France (d. 1398)
  - Michael Palaiologos, Byzantine prince
- probable – Salvestro de' Medici, provost of Florence (d. 1388)

1332

- May 27 – Ibn Khaldun, North African Arab historian (d. 1406)
- June 8 – Cangrande II della Scala, Lord of Verona (d. 1359)
- June 16 – Isabella de Coucy, English princess, daughter of King Edward III of England (d. 1379 or 1382)
- June 18 – John V Palaiologos, Byzantine Emperor (d. 1391)
- October 10 – King Charles II of Navarre (d. 1387)
- date unknown
  - Pero López de Ayala, Spanish soldier (d. 1407)
  - Elizabeth de Burgh, 4th Countess of Ulster (d. 1363)
  - Andrea Vanni, Italian painter (d. c. 1414)
  - Hanna van Recklinghausen, Dutch banker
  - Xu Da, Chinese military leader (d. 1385)
- Approximate
  - William Langland, English poet (d. c.1400)
  - Catherine of Vadstena, Swedish saint (d. 1381)

1333

- date unknown
  - Kan'ami, Japanese Noh actor and writer (d. 1384)
  - Helena Kantakouzene, empress consort of Byzantium (d. 1396)
  - Mikhail II of Tver (d. 1399)
  - Peter Parler, German architect (d. 1399)
  - Carlo Zeno, Venetian admiral (d. 1418)

1334

- January 4 – Amadeus VI of Savoy (d. 1383)
- January 13 – King Henry II of Castile (d. 1379)
- May 25 – Emperor Sukō (d. 1398)
- August 30 – King Pedro of Castile (d. 1369)
- date unknown
  - King James I of Cyprus (d. 1398)
  - Margaret Graham, Countess of Menteith, Scottish noble (d. c. 1380)
  - Hayam Wuruk, Javanese ruler (d. 1389)

1335

- May 24 – Margaret of Bohemia, Queen of Hungary (d. 1349)
- October 27 – Yi Seong-gye, Korean founder of the Joseon Dynasty
- Gülçiçek Hatun, first wife of Ottoman Sultan Murad I
- Marko Mrnjavčević, de jure Serbian king
- Milica, wife of Prince Lazar of Serbia (d. 1405)
- Tiphaine Raguenel, Breton astrologer (d. 1373)

1336

- April 9 – Timur, founder of the Timurid Empire (d. 1405)
- July 25 – Albert I, Duke of Bavaria (d. 1404)
- date unknown
  - Gao Qi, Chinese poet (d. 1374)
  - Cyprian, Metropolitan of Kiev (died 1406)
- probable
  - Stefan Uroš V, Emperor of the Serbs (d. 1371)

1337

- February 25 – Wenceslaus I, Duke of Luxembourg, Czech Duke of Luxembourg (d. 1383)
- date unknown
  - Louis II, Duke of Bourbon (d. 1410)
  - Jean Froissart, historian and courtier from Hainaut (d. 1405)
  - Bianca of Savoy, lady consort of Milan (d. 1387)
  - Chŏng Mong-ju, Goryeo diplomat and poet (d. 1392)
  - Robert III of Scotland, second monarch from the House of Stewart to rule Scotland (d. 1406)

1338

- January 13 – Chŏng Mong-ju, Korean civil minister, diplomat and scholar (d. 1392)
- January 21 – Charles V of France (d. 1380)
- February 3 – Joanna of Bourbon, queen consort of France (d. 1378)
- March 23 – Emperor Go-Kōgon of Japan, Northern Court emperor during a conflict between two imperial lines (d. 1374)
- October 5 – Alexios III of Trebizond (d. 1390)
- November 29 – Lionel of Antwerp, 1st Duke of Clarence (d. 1368)
- date unknown
  - George de Dunbar, 10th Earl of March (d. 1420)
  - Muhammed V, Sultan of Granada (d. 1391)
  - Niccolò II d'Este, Marquis of Ferrara (d. 1388)
  - Thomas de Ros, 4th Baron de Ros (d. 1383)
  - Margaret de Stafford (d. 1396)
  - Tvrtko I of Bosnia (d. 1391)

1339

- July 23 – Louis I, Duke of Anjou (d. 1384)
- November 1 – Rudolf IV, Duke of Austria (d. 1365)
- date unknown:
  - Pope Alexander V, Antipope (d. 1410)
  - Erik Magnusson, king of parts of Sweden 1356–1359 (d. 1359)
  - Frederick, Duke of Bavaria-Landshut (d. 1393)
  - Pope Innocent VII (d. 1406)
  - John IV, Duke of Brittany (d. 1399)
  - Juana Manuel of Castile, queen consort of Castile (d. 1381)
  - Ali ibn Mohammed al-Jurjani, Persian Arab encyclopaedist (d. 1414)

== Deaths ==
1330

- January 13 – Duke Frederick I of Austria (b. 1286)
- January 21 – Joan II, Countess of Burgundy, queen dowager of France (b. 1291)
- March 19 – Edmund of Woodstock, 1st Earl of Kent, son of Edward I and brother of Edward II (executed by Roger Mortimer) (b. 1301)
- May 3 – Alexios II Megas Komnenos, Emperor of Trebizond (b. 1282)
- c. July 31 – Tsar Michael Shishman of Bulgaria (b. 1280s?)
- August 25 – On or about this date, Sir James Douglas, Scottish guerilla leader during the Wars of Scottish Independence (b. circa 1286)
- September 28 – Elizabeth of Bohemia, queen consort of Bohemia (b. 1292)
- November 29 – Roger Mortimer, 1st Earl of March, de facto ruler of England (b. 1287)
- date unknown
  - Pietro Cavallini, Italian artist (b. 1259)
  - Guillaume Durand, French clergyman
  - Immanuel the Roman, Italian scholar and poet (b. 1270)
  - Maximus Planudes, Byzantine grammarian and theologian
  - Uthman ibn Abi al-Ula, Marinid prince and shaykh al-ghuzat of the Emirate of Granada

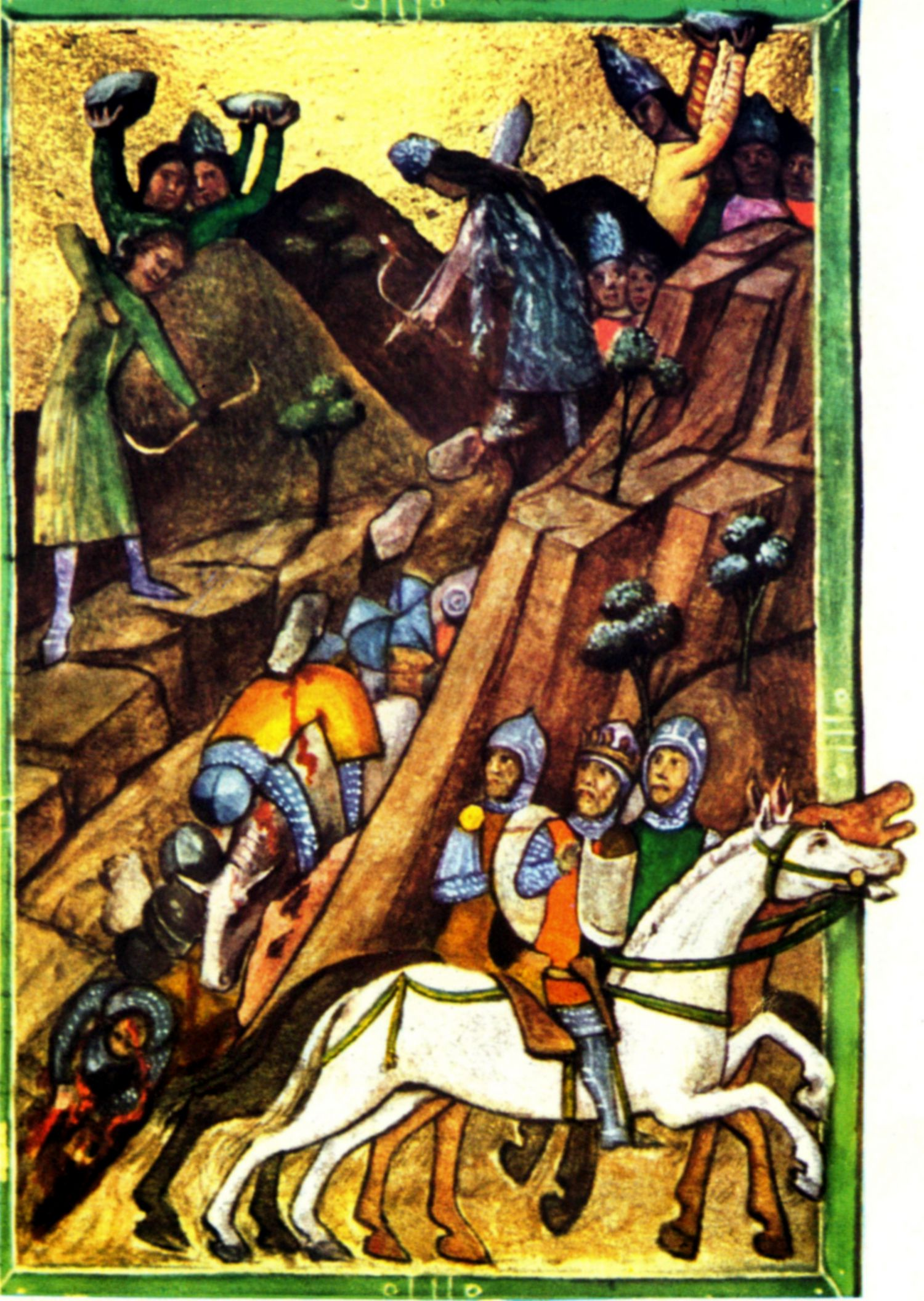
The Battle of Posada (November 9–12, 1330) in Chronicon Pictum. The Basarab I of Wallachia's army ambushes Charles Robert of Anjou, king of Hungary and his 30,000-strong invading army. The Vlach (Romanian) warriors roll down rocks over the cliff edges in a place where the Hungarian mounted knights cannot escape from them nor climb the heights to dislodge the attackers.

1331

- January 14 – Odoric of Pordenone, Italian explorer
- April 17 – Robert de Vere, 6th Earl of Oxford (b. c. 1257)
- May 12 – Engelbert of Admont, abbot of Admont in Styria
- October 27 – Abulfeda, Kurdish Syrian historian and geographer (b. 1273)
- November 11 – Stefan Uroš III Dečanski of Serbia (b. c. 1285)
- December 26 – Philip I, Prince of Taranto, titular Latin Emperor (b. 1278)
- December 30 – Bernard Gui, French inquisitor (b. 1261 or 1262)
- date unknown – Matilda of Hainaut, Princess of Achaea (b. 1293)

1332

- January 8 – Andronikos III Megas Komnenos, Emperor of Trebizond
- February – Henry Hussey, 1st Baron Hussey (b. c. 1265)
- February 13 – Andronikos II Palaiologos, Byzantine Emperor (b. 1259)
- March 13 – Theodore Metochites, Byzantine Empire statesman, author, man of learning, and patron of the arts (b. 1270)
- June 16 – Adam de Brome, founder of Oriel College, Oxford
- July 20 – Thomas Randolph, 1st Earl of Moray, regent of Scotland
- August 2 – King Christopher II of Denmark (b. 1276)
- August 11 – at the Battle of Dupplin Moor
  - Domhnall II, Earl of Mar
  - Robert II Keith, Marischal of Scotland
  - Thomas Randolph, 2nd Earl of Moray
  - Muireadhach III, Earl of Menteith
  - Robert Bruce, Lord of Liddesdale
- September 4 – García de Ayerbe, Spanish bishop and crusade theorist
- date unknown
  - Jayaatu Khan Tugh Temür, Emperor Wenzong of the Yuan dynasty (b. 1304)
  - Rinchinbal Khan, Emperor Ningzong of the Yuan dynasty (b. 1326)
- approximate date – Mary of Woodstock, English princess (b. 1279)

1333

- February 7 – Nikko, Japanese priest, founder of Nichiren Shoshu Buddhism (b. 1246)
- March – William of Alnwick, Franciscan friar and theologian
- March 2 – King Wladyslaw I of Poland (b. 1261)
- June 6 – William Donn de Burgh, 3rd Earl of Ulster (b. 1312)
- June 18 – Henry XV, Duke of Bavaria (b. 1312)
- July 19 (at the Battle of Halidon Hill):
  - John Campbell, Earl of Atholl
  - Alexander Bruce, Earl of Carrick
  - Sir Archibald Douglas
  - Maol Choluim II, Earl of Lennox
  - Kenneth de Moravia, 4th Earl of Sutherland
- July 28 – Guy VIII of Viennois, Dauphin of Vienne (b. 1309)
- November 9 – Empress Saionji Kishi of Japan (b. c.1303)
- October 16 – Antipope Nicholas V
- date unknown
  - Prince Morikuni, 9th and last shōgun of the Kamakura shogunate in Japan. (b. 1301)
  - Nichimoku, Japanese priest, the 3rd high priest of Taisekiji temple and Nichiren Shoshu (b. 1260)

1334

- January 17 – John of Brittany, Earl of Richmond (b. c. 1266)
- December 4 – Pope John XXII (b. 1249)
- date unknown – Sheikh Safi-ad-din Ardabili of Persia (b. 1251)
- Isabella de Vesci, politically active French noblewoman (b. 1260s)

1335

- April 2 – Duke Henry of Carinthia
- August 12 – Prince Moriyoshi, Japanese shōgun (b. 1308)
- August 23 – Heilwige Bloemardinne, Dutch Christian mystic (b. c. 1265)
- October 31 – Marie of Évreux, French noblewoman (b. 1303)
- December 1 – Abu Sa'id Bahadur Khan, Mongol ruler of the Ilkhanate (b. 1305)

1336

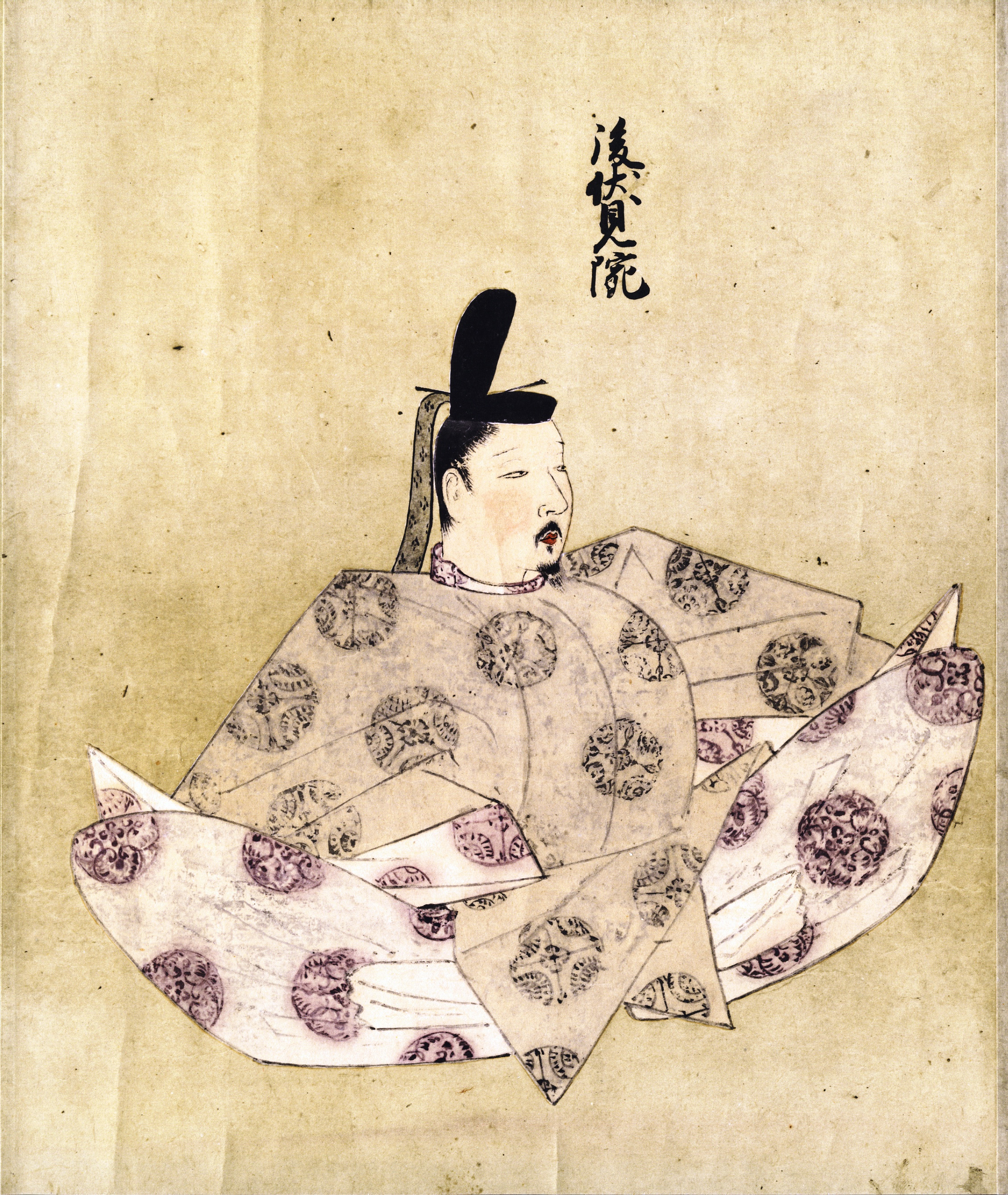
Emperor Go-Fushimi

- January 20 – John de Bohun, 5th Earl of Hereford (b. 1306)
- February 25 – Margiris, Duke of Samogitia
- March 20 – Maurice Csák, Hungarian Dominican friar (b. c. 1270)
- May 17 – Emperor Go-Fushimi of Japan (b. 1288)
- July 4 – Elizabeth of Portugal, queen consort and saint (b. 1271)
- September 5 – Charles d'Évreux (b. 1305)
- date unknown
  - Bernard VIII, Count of Comminges (b. c. 1285)
  - Arpa Ke'un, Ilkhanid ruler
  - Guillaume Pierre Godin, French Dominican philosopher (b. c. 1260)
  - Hugh II of Arborea
  - Ramon Muntaner, Catalan soldier and writer (b. 1270)
  - Cino da Pistoia, Italian poet (b. 1270)
  - Richard of Wallingford, English monk and mathematician (b. 1292)
  - Ghiyas al-Din ibn Rashid al-Din, Ilkhanate politician
  - Turgut Alp, Kayı and Ottoman soldier and commander in-chief (b. 1200) at the age of 136.

1337

- January 8 – Giotto di Bondone, Italian painter (b. 1267)
- June 7 – William I, Count of Hainaut (b. 1286)
- June 15 – Angelo da Clareno, Italian Franciscan and leader of a group of Fraticelli (b. 1247)
- June 25 – Frederick III of Sicily (b. 1272)
- June 30 – Eleanor de Clare, politically active English noble (b. 1290)
- date unknown
  - Changshi, khan of the Chagatai Khanate
  - William Frangipani, Latin Archbishop of Patras
  - Musa I of Mali, ruler of the Malian Empire (b. c.1280)
  - Prince Narinaga, Japanese Shōgun (b. 1326, d. either 1337 or 1344, the sources are contradictory)

1338

- April 8 – Stephen Gravesend, Bishop of London
- April 24 – Theodore I, Marquess of Montferrat (b. c. 1270)
- May – John Wishart, Scottish bishop
- May 5 – Prince Tsunenaga, son of the Japanese Emperor (b. 1324)
- May 23 – Alice de Warenne, Countess of Arundel, English noble (b. 1287)
- June 10 – Kitabatake Akiie, Japanese governor (b. 1318; d. in battle)
- July – Muhammad Khan, Persian monarch
- August 4 – Thomas of Brotherton, 1st Earl of Norfolk (b. 1300)
- August 17 – Nitta Yoshisada, Japanese samurai (b. 1301; d. in battle)
- August 22 – William II, Duke of Athens (b. 1312)
- December 21 – Thomas Hemenhale, Bishop of Worcester
- date unknown
  - Alfonso Fadrique, Sicilian noble
  - Awhadi Maraghai, Persian poet
  - Marino Sanuto the Elder, Venetian statesman and geographer (b. c. 1260)
  - Nitta Yoshiaki, Japanese samurai
- probable – Prince Narinaga, Japanese shōgun (b. 1325)

1339

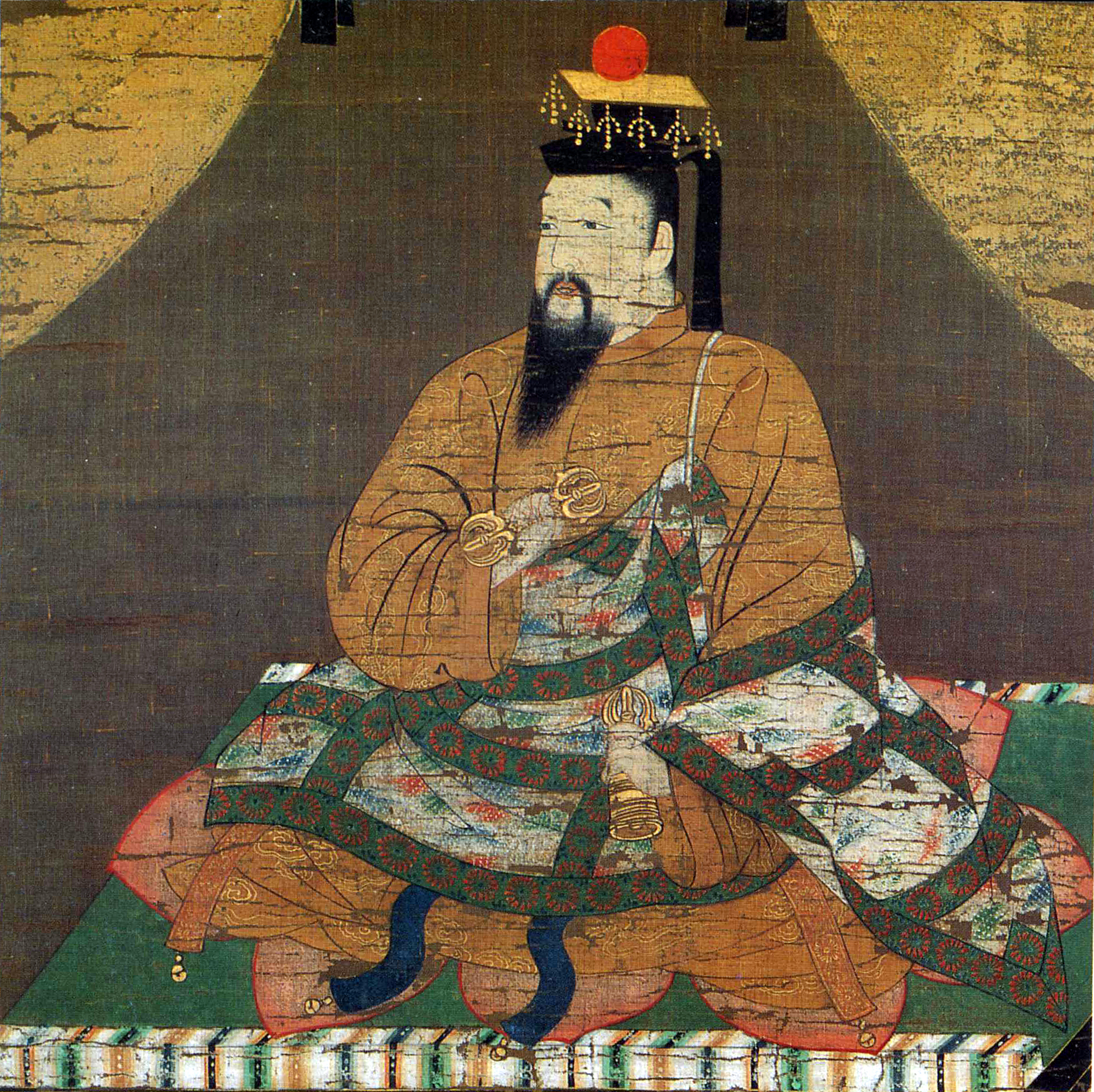
Emperor Go-Daigo

- February 17 – Otto, Duke of Austria (b. 1301)
- May 26 – Aldona Ona, Queen of Poland (b. c. 1309)
- August 16 – Azzone Visconti, founder of the state of Milan (b. 1302)
- August 25 – Henry de Cobham, 1st Baron Cobham (b. 1260)
- September 1 – Henry XIV, Duke of Bavaria (b. 1305)
- September 19 – Emperor Go-Daigo of Japan (b. 1288)
- October 29 – Grand Prince Aleksandr Mikhailovich of Tver (b. 1301)
