= 1333 in Scotland =

- Centuries: 12th; 13th; 14th; 15th; 16th
- Decades: 1310s; 1320s; 1330s; 1340s; 1350s
- See also: List of years in Scotland; Timeline of Scottish history 1333 in: England • Elsewhere

Events from the year 1333 in the Kingdom of Scotland.

== Incumbents ==
- Monarch – David II

== Events ==
- 25 March – Battle of Dornock
- 19 July – Battle of Halidon Hill results in decisive English victory

== Deaths ==
- 19 July – Sir Archibald Douglas, killed at Battle of Halidon Hill
- 19 July – William IV, Lord of Douglas, killed at Battle of Halidon Hill
- 19 July – Hugh, Earl of Ross, killed at Battle of Halidon Hill
- 19 July – Maol Choluim II, Earl of Lennox, killed at Battle of Halidon Hill
- 19 July – Alexander de Brus, Earl of Carrick, killed at Battle of Halidon Hill
- 19 July – Kenneth de Moravia, 4th Earl of Sutherland, killed at Battle of Halidon Hill
- 19 July – Alan Stewart of Dreghorn, killed at Battle of Halidon Hill
- 19 July – John Campbell, Earl of Atholl, killed at Battle of Halidon Hill

== See also ==
- Timeline of Scottish history
