= 1358 =

1358 in various calendars
- Gregorian calendar: 1358; MCCCLVIII
- Ab urbe condita: 2111
- Armenian calendar: 807; ԹՎ ՊԷ
- Assyrian calendar: 6108
- Balinese saka calendar: 1279–1280
- Bengali calendar: 764–765
- Berber calendar: 2308
- English Regnal year: 31 Edw. 3 – 32 Edw. 3
- Buddhist calendar: 1902
- Burmese calendar: 720
- Byzantine calendar: 6866–6867
- Chinese calendar: 丁酉年 (Fire Rooster); 4055 or 3848 — to — 戊戌年 (Earth Dog); 4056 or 3849
- Coptic calendar: 1074–1075
- Discordian calendar: 2524
- Ethiopian calendar: 1350–1351
- Hebrew calendar: 5118–5119
- Hindu calendars
- Vikram Samvat: 1414–1415
- Shaka Samvat: 1279–1280
- Kali Yuga: 4458–4459
- Holocene calendar: 11358
- Igbo calendar: 358–359
- Iranian calendar: 736–737
- Islamic calendar: 759–760
- Japanese calendar: Enbun 3 (延文３年)
- Javanese calendar: 1270–1271
- Julian calendar: 1358; MCCCLVIII
- Korean calendar: 3691
- Minguo calendar: 554 before ROC 民前554年
- Nanakshahi calendar: −110
- Thai solar calendar: 1900–1901
- Tibetan calendar: མེ་མོ་བྱ་ལོ་ (female Fire-Bird); 1484 or 1103 or 331 — to — ས་ཕོ་ཁྱི་ལོ་ (male Earth-Dog); 1485 or 1104 or 332

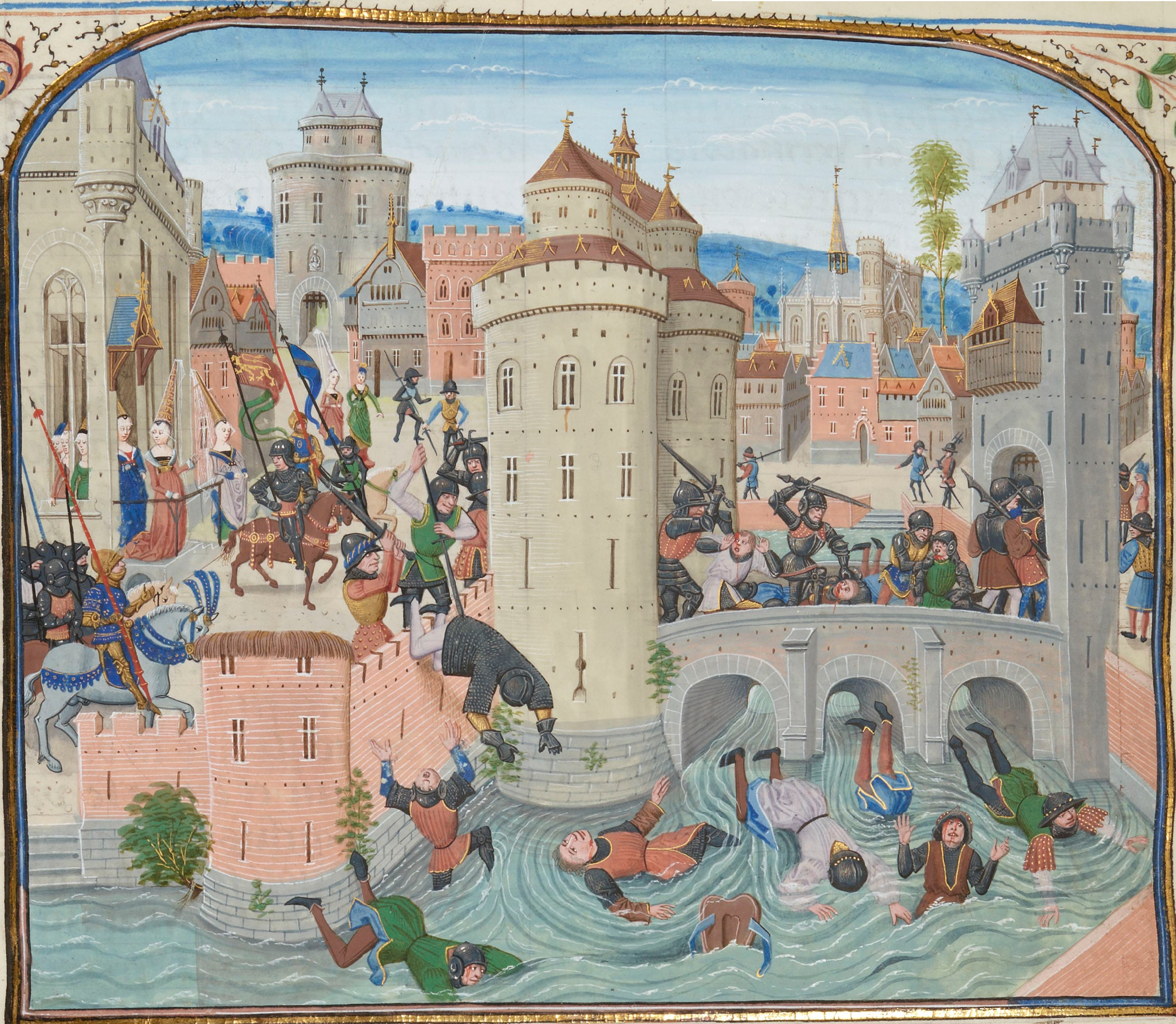
June 10: The Jacquerie, a destructive revolt by French peasants against the nobles, is brutally suppressed by the Franch Army.

Year 1358 (MCCCLVIII) was a common year starting on Monday of the Julian calendar.

== Events ==
=== January–March ===
- January 10 – Abu Inan Faris, Sultan of Morocco of the Marinid dynasty is assassinated in a conspiracy by his vizier, Faris bin Maymum, who has the Sultan strangled to death. Muhammad II ibn Faris becomes the new Sultan briefly before being replaced by Abu Bakr ibn Faris
- February 11 – At Kalaburagi (now located in the Karnataka state of India), Mohammed Shah I becomes Bahmani Sultan of Deccan after the death of Sultan Ala-ud-Din Bahman Shah.
- February 18 – The Treaty of Zadar is signed between the Kingdom of Croatia and the Republic of Venice: The Venetians lose influence over their former Dalmatian holdings.
- February 23 – Albert of Wittelsbach, Duke of Bavaria, is appointed as the Holy Roman Empire's regent for Holland, and soon given control of Hainaut, and Zeeland, and assigned to suppress rebellions within what is now the Netherlands during the ongoing Hook and Cod wars.
- March 16 – King Haakon VI of Norway designates the city of Skien as a city with trading privileges, making it the sixth town with city status in Norway.

=== April–June ===
- April 6 – A peace conference opens in Milan with participation by nearly all of the Italian kingdoms, republics and city states to discuss a war between a league of cites nadd Milan.
- May 8 – The First Treaty of London is signed at Windsor Castle between King Edward III of England and King Jean II of France, who has been held prisoner of war in England since 1356. Under the terms of the treaty, the ransom for King Jean II and other prisoners of war retained as hostages is set at four million écus, to be paid in six annual installments. France also agrees to cede one-fourth of its territory to England, and King Edward III renounces his claims to the throne of France. The amount of 4,000,000 écus represents most of France's income and payment proves to be financially impossible, leading to a renegotiation of the terms after France is unable to make its first payment on November 1.
- May 28 – Hundred Years' War: The Jacquerie – A peasant rebellion begins in France, which consumes the Beauvais, and allies with Étienne Marcel's seizure of Paris. Over the three weeks that follow, the angry peasants, angry about the devastation caused in the and around Paris by the Kingdom of Navarre, murder members of the French nobility, destroy castles, and commit numerous atrocities.
- June 8 – After two months of negotiations, the treaty of Sant'Ambrogio is signed in Milan with Novara and Alba returned to the Visconti family and Asti and Pavia being kept by the Marquis of Montferrat.
- June 10 – The Jacquerie rebellion is brutally suppressed by French troops.
- June 17 – Androin de la Roche abandons his two-month siege of the city of Forli.
- June 27 – The Republic of Ragusa is founded in what is now Croatia, after being freed from the Republic of Venice by the Treaty of Zadar.

=== July–September ===
- July 10 – Battle of Mello: The Jacquerie rebellion is defeated by a coalition of nobles, led by Charles II of Navarre.
- July 25 – De la Roche captures Meldola after a 24-day siege.
- August 22 – Pietro Badoer of the Republic of Venice is named as the Duke of Crete, Venice's governor over the nominally independent Kingdom of Candia.
- September 1 – A Teutonic knight, Bonifacius Rotarius of Asti, becomes the first person known to have climbed to the top of the 11,608 feet (3,538 m) high mountain Rocciamelone, in the Italian Alps, bringing with him a small image of the Virgin Mary as a gesture of gratitude for having survived captivity in the Holy Land during a crusade against the Muslims, and begin an annual tradition of Catholics making a pilgrimage to the summit of Rocciamelone every August 5.
- September 21 – Badoer, Duke of Crete, meets with an ambassador sent from the Emirate of Menteshe to discuss trade between the two nations.
- September 29 – Przemyslaus I Noszak become the new Duke of Teschen (now in Poland) upon the death of his father, Casimir I of Cieszyn.

=== October–December ===
- October 12 – Hook and Cod wars: On orders of Albert, Duke of Holland, Dirk Loef of Horne provides 30 archers to aid in Albert's siege of Heusden, a rebellious city in the Netherlands, and the city surrenders in January.
- October 13 – Badoer, on behalf of Crete, signs a treaty of peace and trade with the Emirate of Menteshe, located in western Turkey and ruled by the Emir Musa.
- November 1 – France defaults on its obligation to pay 600,000 écus as the first installment on the 4,000,000 écus owed to England under the First Treaty of London.
- November 24 – Hugh IV, King of Cyprus since 1324, abdicates and his son Peter I becomes the new monarch.
- December 4 – Hook and Cod wars: Albert, Duke of Bavaria, begins the siege of Heemskerk Castle after an unsuccessful ambush against Reinoud I van Brederode by rebels. Heemskerk surrenders after almost four months, on March 24, 1359.

=== Date unknown ===
- Mubariz al-Din Muhammad, leader of the Arab Muzaffarid tribe, expels the Blue Horde from Ilkhanate territory in Persia. The Muzaffarid then release control of the Il-Khanate, after being marched on by the Mongol Jalayirid tribe, ruled by Shaikh Uvais. Shaikh Uvais becomes the new Il-Khan. The Ilkhanate is effectively now disbanded, and replaced by the Jalayirid dynasty of Persia.
- Shah Shuja overthrows his father, Mubarazuddin Muhammad, as leader of the Muzaffarid tribe.
- Estimation: Nanjing in Yuan China becomes the largest city of the world, taking the lead from Hangzhou in Yuan China.

== Births ==
- February 20 – Eleanor of Aragon, queen of John I of Castile (d. 1382)
- August 24 – King John I of Castile (d. 1390)
- September 25 – Ashikaga Yoshimitsu, Japanese shōgun (d. 1408)
- date unknown
  - Ide Pedersdatter Falk, Danish noblewoman (d. 1399)
  - Anne of Auvergne, Sovereign Dauphine of Auvergne and Countess of Forez (d. 1417)

== Deaths ==
- January 6 – Gertrude van der Oosten, Dutch beguine
- January 10 – Abu Inan Faris, Marinid ruler of Morocco (b. 1329)
- February 11 – Ala-ud-Din Bahman Shah, first Bahmani Sultan of Deccan
- June 7 – Ashikaga Takauji, Japanese shōgun (b. 1305)
- c. June – Guillaume Cale, French peasant revolutionary (executed)
- July 31 – Étienne Marcel, Provost of the merchants of Paris
- August 16 – Albert II, Duke of Austria (b. 1298)
- August 22 – Isabella of France, queen consort of Edward II of England (b. 1295)
- November – Gregory of Rimini, Italian philosopher
- December 29 – Niels Bugge, Danish magnate and rebel leader (murdered) (b. 1300)
- date unknown – Brian MacCathmhaoil, Irish Bishop of Clogher (plague)
