= 1334 in Scotland =

- Centuries: 12th; 13th; 14th; 15th; 16th
- Decades: 1310s; 1320s; 1330s; 1340s; 1350s
- See also: List of years in Scotland; Timeline of Scottish history 1334 in: England • Elsewhere

Events from the year 1334 in the Kingdom of Scotland.

== Incumbents ==
- Monarch – David II

== Events ==
- 23 December – Henry de Beaumont, 4th Earl of Buchan compelled to surrender to Andrew de Moray, the new Guardian of Scotland after a siege at Dundarg Castle.

== See also ==
- Timeline of Scottish history
