= 1332 in Scotland =

- Centuries: 12th; 13th; 14th; 15th; 16th
- Decades: 1310s; 1320s; 1330s; 1340s; 1350s
- See also: List of years in Scotland; Timeline of Scottish history 1332 in: England • Elsewhere

Events from the year 1332 in the Kingdom of Scotland.

== Incumbents ==
- Monarch – David II

== Events ==
- 2 August – Domhnall II, Earl of Mar elected as the new Regent of Scotland at a meeting of the nobles at Perth
- 6 August – Battle of Wester Kinghorn sees victory for forces supporting Edward Balliol
- 10–11 August: Battle of Dupplin Moor, decisive victory for supporters of Edward Balliol
- 16 December – Battle of Annan, decisive victory for Bruce loyalist forces, ejecting Balliol from Scotland

== Deaths ==
- 20 July – Thomas Randolph, 1st Earl of Moray, Regent of Scotland (born 1278)
- 11 August – Muireadhach III, Earl of Menteith at Battle of Dupplin Moor
- 11 August – Robert II Keith, Marischal of Scotland at Battle of Dupplin Moor
- 11 August – Thomas Randolph, 2nd Earl of Moray at Battle of Dupplin Moor

== See also ==
- Timeline of Scottish history
