= 1335 in Scotland =

- Centuries: 12th; 13th; 14th; 15th; 16th
- Decades: 1310s; 1320s; 1330s; 1340s; 1350s
- See also: List of years in Scotland; Timeline of Scottish history 1335 in: England • Elsewhere

Events from the year 1335 in the Kingdom of Scotland.

== Incumbents ==
- Monarch – David II

== Events ==
- 30 July – Battle of Boroughmuir, Scots victory
- 30 November – Battle of Culblean, decisive Bruce loyalist victory

== Deaths ==
- David III Strathbogie, 14th-century Anglo-Scottish noble (born 1309)
- John de Lindsay, 14th-century bishop of Glasgow.

== See also ==
- Timeline of Scottish history
