= 1331 in Scotland =

- Centuries: 12th; 13th; 14th; 15th; 16th
- Decades: 1310s; 1320s; 1330s; 1340s; 1350s
- See also: List of years in Scotland; Timeline of Scottish history 1331 in: England • Elsewhere

Events from the year 1331 in the Kingdom of Scotland.

== Incumbents ==
- Monarch – David II

== Events ==
- 24 November – David and his wife are crowned at Scone.

== Deaths ==
- November/December – John Stewart, 1st Earl of Angus.

== See also ==
- Timeline of Scottish history
