= Battle of Margate =

1387 naval battle of the Hundred Years' War

- Part of the Hundred Years' War
Date	24–25 March 1387
Location	English Channel, from off Margate to Cadzand and Sluis 51.29°N 2.22°E
Result	English victory

Belligerents
Kingdom of England	Kingdom of France; Crown of Castile; County of Flanders

Commanders and leaders
Richard FitzAlan, Earl of Arundel	Sir Jean de Bucq (surrendered)

Strength
51 ships 2,500 men	250–360 ships 2,500 men

Casualties and losses
Minimal	12+ ships sunk or burned 80–126 ships captured Many men killed or taken prisoner 8,000+ tuns of wine captured
- Approximate location

The Battle of Margate (/ˈmɑːɡeɪt/), also known as the Battle of Cadzand (not to be confused with the 1337 Battle of Cadzand), was a naval battle that took place on 24–25 March 1387, during the Caroline War phase of the Hundred Years' War, between an English fleet and a Franco-Castilian-Flemish wine fleet.

The battle ended in an English victory: many ships were captured, and a vast haul of booty was acquired, including 8,000–9,000 tuns of wine.

== Background ==
In October 1386, Richard II's so-called Wonderful Parliament approved a commission that began gathering men and ships for an amphibious assault on Flanders. This was aimed at provoking an insurrection that would replace the government of Philip the Bold with a pro-English regime. It was also hoped this would dispel any attempt by the French to invade England. On 10 December, Richard, Earl of Arundel, a member of the commission, was appointed admiral; a week later, the earl was indentured to serve with 2,500 men for three months, beginning on 1 March 1387.

On 16 March, Arundel arrived at Sandwich, commanding 60 ships. Intending to invade England, the French and Castilians had gathered an army of 30,000 men and a fleet of 1,200 vessels at Sluis (Sluys) the previous autumn. Philip the Bold, who was the driving force in Charles VI's minority government, suddenly fell ill and so the expedition was cancelled and the fleet dispersed. Many ships of the fleet, however, were still maintained and put to use in convoys for trading ships.

== Battle ==
On 24 March 1387, Arundel's fleet sighted part of a French fleet of around 250–360 vessels, commanded by Sir Jean de Bucq. This fleet included contingents of Flemish and Castilian vessels, many of which were also carrying wine from La Rochelle to Sluis. Although significantly larger than Arundel's flotilla, De Bucq's fleet was inferior in both workforce and armament, with inadequate soldiers to defend it from the English attack. As the English attacked, many Flemish vessels deserted the fleet; from there, a series of battles commenced, from Margate into the Channel towards the Flemish coast. The first engagement, off Margate itself, was the most extensive action and forced the allied fleet to flee, losing many ships.

The battle took place mostly in the southern North Sea, while the two fleets were on the move, and Cadzand where the English finally defeated the Franco-Castilian-Flemish fleet. More French and Castilian ships were sunk or captured. Arundel pursued the remnants of the fleet to Sluis, where he arrived two days later. He penetrated the outer anchorage and captured seven more ships, with another eleven more burnt or sunk in the harbour. The English set up a blockade that lasted more than two weeks; they stopped and seized incoming vessels. However, instead of holding the port, which was virtually undefended, the earl put landing parties ashore to burn and plunder coastal villages and seize wealthy prisoners for ransom. More booty was captured, but the Flemish uprising never materialised.

On 14 April, with supplies running low and his men falling ill, Arundel returned to England. In total, over a dozen ships were sunk or burned, and 68 ships were captured, including three heavily laden Castilian carracks. De Bucq was captured and promptly sent to the Tower of London, where he died three years later.

== Aftermath ==
After refitting, the earl sailed to Brittany, where he resupplied the besieged garrison at Brest, but failed to effect a reconciliation with John IV, Duke of Brittany. Arundel had won a significant victory, and ended the threat of a French and Castilian invasion for the next decade and weakened their naval capabilities. The captured wine barrels were taken to London, where they were sold for a fraction of the normal price and won much popularity for Arundel.

Margate was the last major naval battle of the Caroline War phase of the Hundred Years' War. It destroyed France's chance of invading England for at least the next decade.
