= 1333 =

1333 in various calendars
- Gregorian calendar: 1333; MCCCXXXIII
- Ab urbe condita: 2086
- Armenian calendar: 782; ԹՎ ՉՁԲ
- Assyrian calendar: 6083
- Balinese saka calendar: 1254–1255
- Bengali calendar: 739–740
- Berber calendar: 2283
- English Regnal year: 6 Edw. 3 – 7 Edw. 3
- Buddhist calendar: 1877
- Burmese calendar: 695
- Byzantine calendar: 6841–6842
- Chinese calendar: 壬申年 (Water Monkey); 4030 or 3823 — to — 癸酉年 (Water Rooster); 4031 or 3824
- Coptic calendar: 1049–1050
- Discordian calendar: 2499
- Ethiopian calendar: 1325–1326
- Hebrew calendar: 5093–5094
- Hindu calendars
- Vikram Samvat: 1389–1390
- Shaka Samvat: 1254–1255
- Kali Yuga: 4433–4434
- Holocene calendar: 11333
- Igbo calendar: 333–334
- Iranian calendar: 711–712
- Islamic calendar: 733–734
- Japanese calendar: Shōkei 2 (正慶２年)
- Javanese calendar: 1245–1246
- Julian calendar: 1333; MCCCXXXIII
- Korean calendar: 3666
- Minguo calendar: 579 before ROC 民前579年
- Nanakshahi calendar: −135
- Thai solar calendar: 1875–1876
- Tibetan calendar: ཆུ་ཕོ་སྤྲེ་ལོ་ (male Water-Monkey); 1459 or 1078 or 306 — to — ཆུ་མོ་བྱ་ལོ་ (female Water-Bird); 1460 or 1079 or 307

Year 1333 (MCCCXXXIII) was a common year starting on Friday of the Julian calendar.

== Events ==
=== January–December ===
- May 18 – Siege of Kamakura in Japan: Forces loyal to Emperor Go-Daigo, led by Nitta Yoshisada, enter and destroy the city, breaking the power of the Hōjō clan over the Kamakura shogunate. The Kamakura period ends, and the Kenmu Restoration under Go-Daigo begins.
- June 6 – William Donn de Burgh, 3rd Earl of Ulster, is murdered as part of the Burke Civil War in Ireland.
- June 8 – King Edward III of England seizes the Isle of Man from Scottish control.
- June 19 – Ashikaga Takauji leads his army into Kyoto as part of the Kenmu Restoration.
- July 7 – The reign of Emperor Kōgon of Japan, first of the Northern Court (Ashikaga) Pretenders, ends.
- July 19 – Wars of Scottish Independence - Battle of Halidon Hill: Edward III of England decisively defeats Sir Archibald Douglas. Berwick-upon-Tweed returns to English control.
- November 4 – The River Arno floods, causing massive damage in Florence, as recorded by Giovanni Villani.

=== Date unknown ===
- A famine (lasting until 1337) breaks out in China, killing six million.
- A great famine takes place in Southern Europe. It is known to historians of Catalonia as Lo mal any primer, "the First Bad Year" (equivalent to the Great Famine of 1315–1317 further north), an early notice of the catastrophes of the second half of this century.
- Jan IV of Dražic, Bishop of Prague, founds a friary and builds a stone bridge at Roudnice in Bohemia.
- The Kapellbrücke wooden bridge over the Reuss in Lucerne (Switzerland) is built; by the 20th century it will be the world's oldest truss bridge and Europe's oldest covered bridge.
- The Venetian historian Marino Sanudo Torsello publishes his History of the realm of Romania (Istoria del regno di Romania), one of the most important sources on the history of Latin Greece.

== Births ==
- date unknown
  - Kan'ami, Japanese Noh actor and writer (d. 1384)
  - Helena Kantakouzene, empress consort of Byzantium (d. 1396)
  - Mikhail II of Tver (d. 1399)
  - Peter Parler, German architect (d. 1399)
  - Carlo Zeno, Venetian admiral (d. 1418)

== Deaths ==
- February 7 – Nikko, Japanese priest, founder of Nichiren Shoshu Buddhism (b. 1246)
- March – William of Alnwick, Franciscan friar and theologian
- March 2 – King Wladyslaw I of Poland (b. 1261)
- June 6 – William Donn de Burgh, 3rd Earl of Ulster (b. 1312)
- June 18 – Henry XV, Duke of Bavaria (b. 1312)
- July 19 (at the Battle of Halidon Hill):
  - John Campbell, Earl of Atholl
  - Alexander Bruce, Earl of Carrick
  - Sir Archibald Douglas
  - Maol Choluim II, Earl of Lennox
  - Kenneth de Moravia, 4th Earl of Sutherland
- July 28 – Guy VIII of Viennois, Dauphin of Vienne (b. 1309)
- November 9 – Empress Saionji Kishi of Japan (b. c.1303)
- October 16 – Antipope Nicholas V
- date unknown
  - Prince Morikuni, 9th and last shōgun of the Kamakura shogunate in Japan. (b. 1301)
  - Nichimoku, Japanese priest, the 3rd high priest of Taisekiji temple and Nichiren Shoshu (b. 1260)
