= 1330 in Scotland =

- Centuries: 12th; 13th; 14th; 15th; 16th
- Decades: 1310s; 1320s; 1330s; 1340s; 1350s
- See also: List of years in Scotland; Timeline of Scottish history 1330 in: England • Elsewhere

Events from the year 1330 in the Kingdom of Scotland.

== Incumbents ==
- Monarch – David II

== Events ==
- 25 August – James Douglas, Lord of Douglas killed while fighting in Spain.

== See also ==
- Timeline of Scottish history
