= Abu Inan Faris =

Marinid sultan from 1348 to 1358

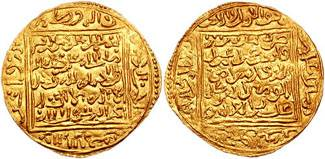
- Coin minted in Fes during the reign of Abu Inan Faris

Marinid Sultan
- Reign: 1348 – 10 January 1358
- Predecessor: Abu al-Hasan Ali ibn Othman
- Successor: Muhammad II ibn Faris
- Born: 1329; Fez
- Died: 10 January 1358 (aged 28–29); Fez
Names
- Fāris ibn ʿAlī al-Marīni
- Dynasty: Marinid
- Father: Abu al-Hasan Ali ibn Othman
- Religion: Islam

Abu Inan Faris (1329 – 10 January 1358) (Arabic: أبو عنان فارس بن علي) was a Marinid ruler. He succeeded his father Abu al-Hasan Ali ibn Othman in 1348. He extended his rule over Tlemcen and Ifriqiya, which covered the north of what is now Algeria and Tunisia, but was forced to retreat due to a revolt of Arab tribes there. He died, strangled by his vizier, in 1358.

== Biography ==
Abu Inan's father, Abu'l Hasan, had taken the town of Tlemcen in 1337. In 1347 Abu'l Hasan annexed Ifriqiya, briefly reuniting the Maghrib territories as they had been under the Almohads. However, Abu'l Hasan went too far in attempting to impose more authority over the Arab tribes, who revolted and in April 1348 defeated his army near Kairouan. Abu Inan Faris, who had been serving as governor of Tlemcen, returned to Fez and declared that he was sultan. Tlemcen and the central Maghreb revolted. Abu Inan took the title of Amir al-Mu'minin ("commander of the believers").

Abu'l Hasan had to return from Ifriqiya by sea. After failing to retake Tlemcen and being defeated by his son, Abu'l Hasan died in May 1351. In 1352 Abu Inan Faris recaptured Tlemcen. He also reconquered the central Maghreb. He took Béjaïa in 1353.

The Nasrid rulers of Granada were concerned that if Abu Inan was able to gain full control of the Maghreb, he would then invade Granada. To weaken him, they sponsored a rebellion by his brother Abul Fadl, who had briefly been governor of Tunis from December 1349. Sultan Abul-Hajjaj of Granada hired ships from Castile and used them to take Abul-Fadl and his supporters to Sousse, where he launched a short-lived rebellion.

Abu Inan continued his eastward expansion, and took Tunis in 1357, becoming master of Ifrikiya. Due to the intrigues of his vizier, Faris bin Maymum, he was forced to retreat from Tunisia in 1357. Abu Inan fell ill in November 1357. His vizier Hasan bin Umar al-Fududi had a dispute with his heir apparent Abu Zayyan Muhammad, so nominated his young son Abu Bakr Sa'id as his successor instead. When Abu Inan began to recover from his illness, the vizier feared he would be punished for nominating Abu Bakr. On 10 January 1358 he had Abu Inan strangled.

== Legacy ==
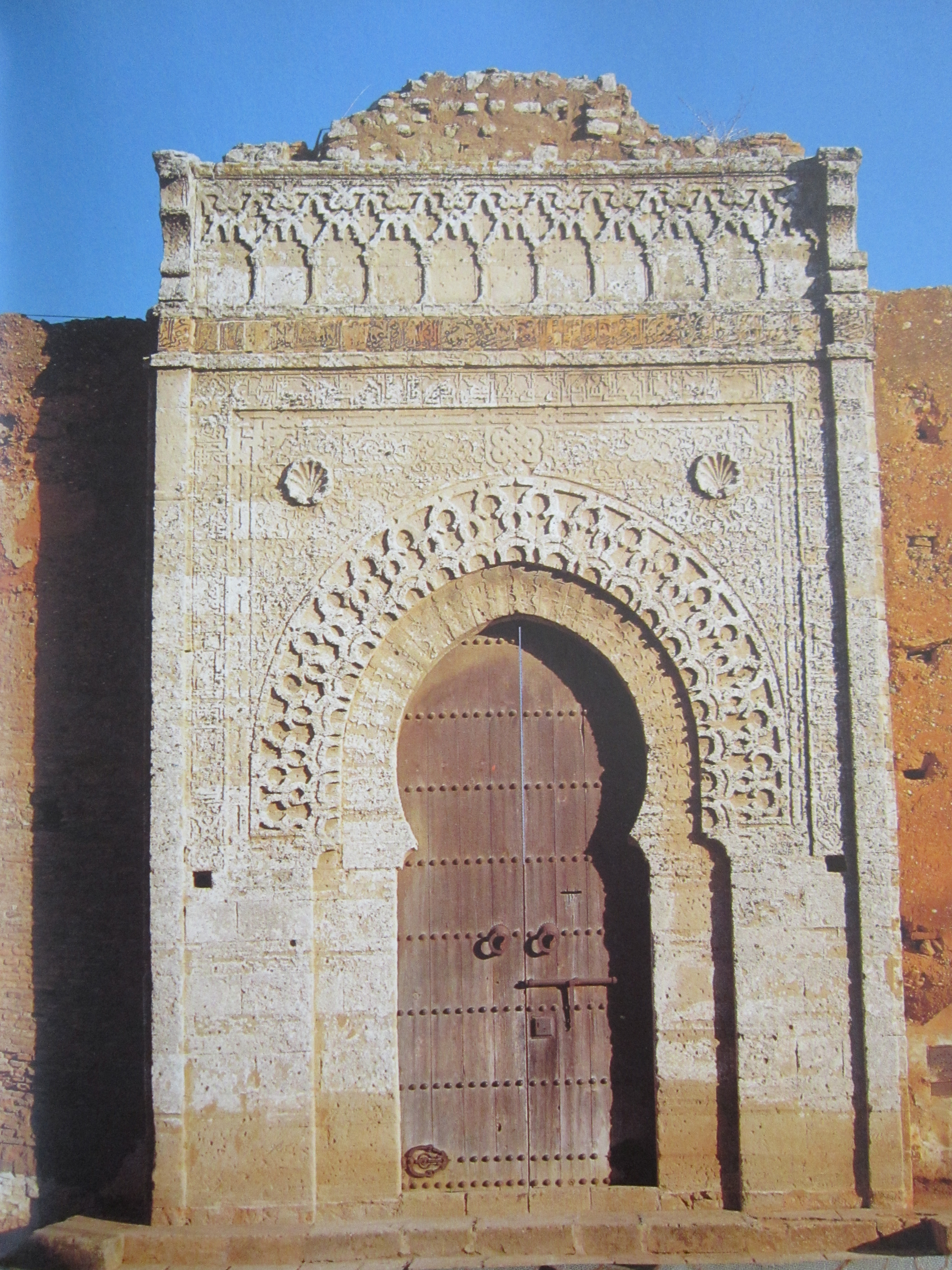
Zawiyat An-Noussak in Salé, built by Abu Inan Faris in 1356

Under Abu Inan's rule the Black Death and the rebellions of Tlemcen and Tunis marked the beginning of the decline of the Marinids. The Marinids proved unable to drive back the Portuguese and the Spaniards, who would start to settle on the North African coast during the reign of the Wattasids, who succeeded the Marinids.

Abu Inan commissioned one of his secretaries, Ibn Juzayy, to record an account of Ibn Battuta's 29 years of travelling. The result, Ibn Battuta's rihla, was completed in December 1355.

Abu Inan built madrasas in Meknes and Fes in 1350, and built another madrasa in Fes in 1357. The Bou Inania Madrasa of Fes and that of Meknes were named after him.

Mont Bouenan (also known by locals as Mount Gharghir) south of Tetouan was named after the sultan.
