= 1337 =

1337 in various calendars
- Gregorian calendar: 1337; MCCCXXXVII
- Ab urbe condita: 2090
- Armenian calendar: 786; ԹՎ ՉՁԶ
- Assyrian calendar: 6087
- Balinese saka calendar: 1258–1259
- Bengali calendar: 743–744
- Berber calendar: 2287
- English Regnal year: 10 Edw. 3 – 11 Edw. 3
- Buddhist calendar: 1881
- Burmese calendar: 699
- Byzantine calendar: 6845–6846
- Chinese calendar: 丙子年 (Fire Rat); 4034 or 3827 — to — 丁丑年 (Fire Ox); 4035 or 3828
- Coptic calendar: 1053–1054
- Discordian calendar: 2503
- Ethiopian calendar: 1329–1330
- Hebrew calendar: 5097–5098
- Hindu calendars
- Vikram Samvat: 1393–1394
- Shaka Samvat: 1258–1259
- Kali Yuga: 4437–4438
- Holocene calendar: 11337
- Igbo calendar: 337–338
- Iranian calendar: 715–716
- Islamic calendar: 737–738
- Japanese calendar: Shōkei 6 (正慶６年)
- Javanese calendar: 1249–1250
- Julian calendar: 1337; MCCCXXXVII
- Korean calendar: 3670
- Minguo calendar: 575 before ROC 民前575年
- Nanakshahi calendar: −131
- Thai solar calendar: 1879–1880
- Tibetan calendar: མེ་ཕོ་བྱི་བ་ལོ་ (male Fire-Rat); 1463 or 1082 or 310 — to — མེ་མོ་གླང་ལོ་ (female Fire-Ox); 1464 or 1083 or 311

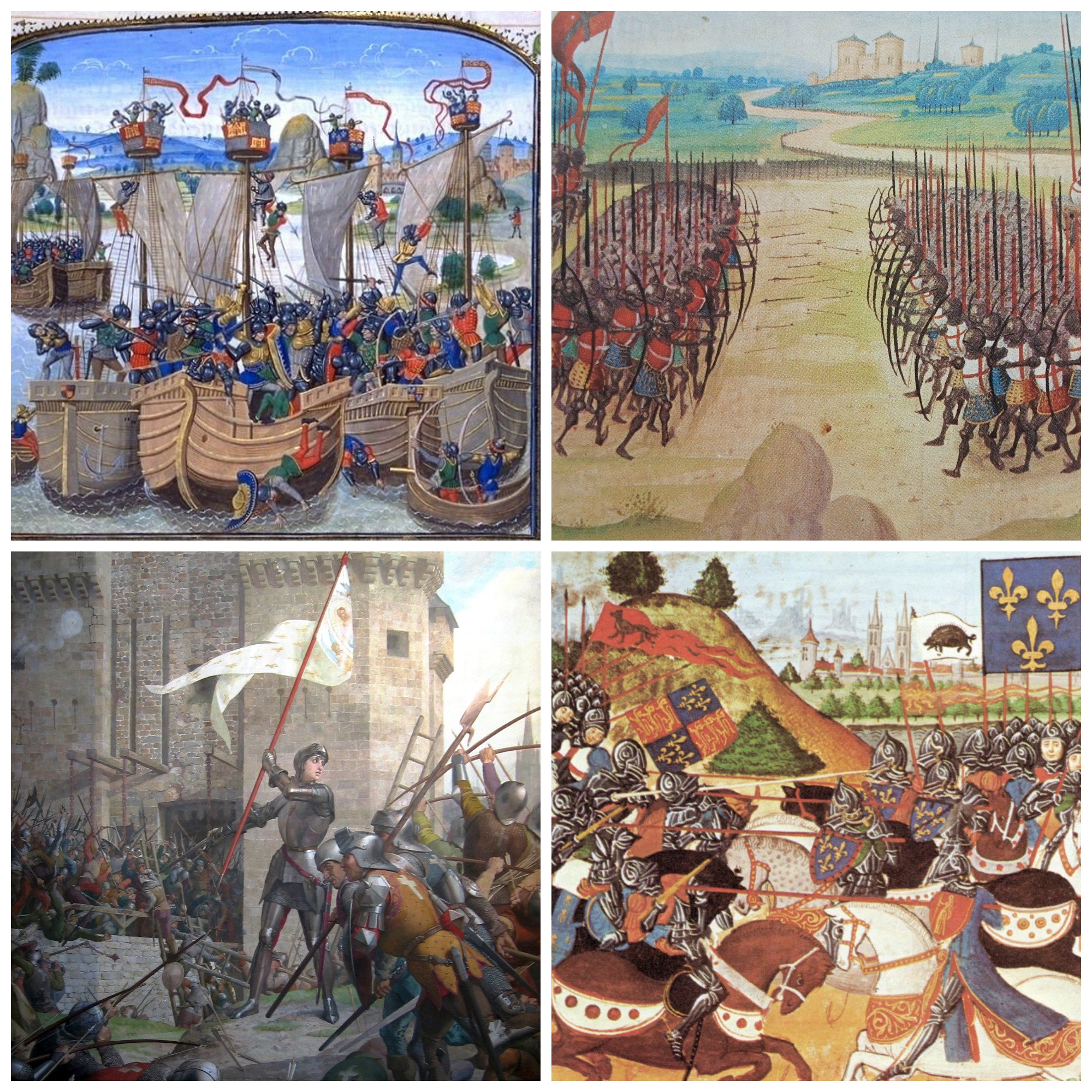
The Hundred Years' War begins.

Year 1337 (MCCCXXXVII) was a common year starting on Wednesday of the Julian calendar.

== Events ==
=== January–December ===
- March 16 – Edward the Black Prince establishes the Duchy of Cornwall, becoming the first English Duke.
- May 24 – Philip VI of France confiscates Gascony from English control.
- August – Second War of Scottish Independence: English forces relieve Stirling Castle, ending Edward III of England's last campaign in Scotland.
- October – Hundred Years' War: Edward III of England formally rejects Philip VI's claim to the French throne, initiating hostilities between France and England.
- November – Battle of Cadzand: English troops raid the Flemish island of Cadzand.

=== Date unknown ===
- Bisham Priory is founded in England.
- The Scaligeri Family loses control of Padua; Alberto della Scala, patron of the music of the Trecento, moves to Verona.
- Petrarch, "father" of Renaissance humanism, first visits Rome to wander its mysterious ruins, with an eye for aesthetics as well as for history, exciting a renewed interest in Classical civilisation.
- The Sofia Psalter is produced in Bulgaria.
- The Despotate of Epirus is conquered by the Byzantine Empire.
- The famine in China, which had lasted since 1332 and killed 6,000,000, comes to an end.
- Siege of Nicomedia: After its foundation by Osman I in about 1299, the Ottoman Empire expanded across Bithynia in north-west Anatolia by capturing territory from the Byzantine Empire.

== Births ==
- February 25 – Wenceslaus I, Duke of Luxembourg, Czech Duke of Luxembourg (d. 1383)
- date unknown
  - Louis II, Duke of Bourbon (d. 1410)
  - Jean Froissart, historian and courtier from Hainaut (d. 1405)
  - Bianca of Savoy, lady consort of Milan (d. 1387)
  - Chŏng Mong-ju, Goryeo diplomat and poet (d. 1392)
  - Robert III of Scotland, second monarch from the House of Stewart to rule Scotland (d. 1406)

== Deaths ==
- January 8 – Giotto, Italian painter (b. 1267)
- June 7 – William I, Count of Hainaut (b. 1286)
- June 15 – Angelo da Clareno, Italian Franciscan and leader of a group of Fraticelli (b. 1247)
- June 25 – Frederick III of Sicily (b. 1272)
- June 30 – Eleanor de Clare, politically active English noble (b. 1290)
- date unknown
  - Changshi, khan of the Chagatai Khanate
  - William Frangipani, Latin Archbishop of Patras
  - Musa I of Mali, ruler of the Malian Empire (b. c.1280)
  - Prince Narinaga, Japanese Shōgun (b. 1326, d. either 1337 or 1344, the sources are contradictory)
