= Tashfin ibn Ali (Marinid) =

Marinid Sultan
- Reign: 1361 – 1362
- Predecessor: Ibrahim ibn Ali
- Successor: Muhammad II ibn Faris
- Born: 1329
- Died: 1362 (aged 32–33)
- Dynasty: Marinid
- Religion: Islam

Tashfin ibn Ali (Arabic:تاشفين بن علي), was Marinid ruler from 1361 to 1362.

== Life ==
Tashfin ibn Ali assumed the throne in 1361 in succession to Ibrahim ibn Ali. He was in turn succeeded by Muhammad II ibn Faris in 1362.
