= Ibrahim ibn Ali Abu Salim =

Marinid Sultan from 1359 to 1361

Ibrahim ibn Ali

Marinid Sultan
- Reign: 1359 – 1361
- Predecessor: Abu Bakr ibn Faris
- Successor: Tachufin ibn Ali
- Born: 1335; Fez
- Died: 1361 (aged 25–26); Fez
- Dynasty: Marinid
- Religion: Islam

Ibrahim ibn Ali Abu Salim (Arabic: أبو سالم إبراهيم بن علي), was Marinid ruler from 1359 to 1361. He assumed the throne in 1359 after Abu Bakr ibn Faris. Also known as Abu Salim, he appointed Abd ibn Khaldun his mazalim (hearer of civil cases) and was in turn succeeded by Tashfin ibn Ali in 1361, after his fall in the autumn to civilian and military officials.
