= Muhammad II ibn Faris =

Marinid Sultan in 1358 and 1362 to 1366

Marinid Sultan (1st reign)
- Reign: 1358
- Predecessor: Abu Inan Faris
- Successor: Abu Bakr ibn Faris

Marinid Sultan (2nd reign)
- Reign: 1362 – 1366
- Predecessor: Tachufin ibn Ali
- Successor: Abu Faris Abdul Aziz I
- Born: 1338
- Died: 1366 (aged 27–28); Fez
- Dynasty: Marinid
- Religion: Islam

Abu Zayyan Muhammad ibn Faris (Arabic: أبو زيان محمد بن فارس), was Marinid ruler in 1358 and again from 1362 to 1366.

== Life ==
Muhammad II ibn Faris briefly assumed the throne after the death of Abu Inan Faris in 1358 before being replaced by Abu Bakr ibn Faris. He was again made sultan in 1362 in succession to Tachufin ibn Ali. From 1362 to 1364, Sijilmasa in the south of the country was ruled independently, first by Abd al-Halim ibn Umar, Abu Muhammed (1362–1363) and then by Abd al-Mu'mim ibn Umar, Abu Malik (1353–1364).

In 1366 Sultan Abu Zayyan tried to remove his vizier Umar bin Abdulla al-Yabani from office, and was killed in response. Abu Faris Abdul Aziz I came to the throne. Once he was firmly in control he had the vizier killed.
