= 1399 =

1399 in various calendars
- Gregorian calendar: 1399; MCCCXCIX
- Ab urbe condita: 2152
- Armenian calendar: 848; ԹՎ ՊԽԸ
- Assyrian calendar: 6149
- Balinese saka calendar: 1320–1321
- Bengali calendar: 805–806
- Berber calendar: 2349
- English Regnal year: 22 Ric. 2 – 1 Hen. 4
- Buddhist calendar: 1943
- Burmese calendar: 761
- Byzantine calendar: 6907–6908
- Chinese calendar: 戊寅年 (Earth Tiger); 4096 or 3889 — to — 己卯年 (Earth Rabbit); 4097 or 3890
- Coptic calendar: 1115–1116
- Discordian calendar: 2565
- Ethiopian calendar: 1391–1392
- Hebrew calendar: 5159–5160
- Hindu calendars
- Vikram Samvat: 1455–1456
- Shaka Samvat: 1320–1321
- Kali Yuga: 4499–4500
- Holocene calendar: 11399
- Igbo calendar: 399–400
- Iranian calendar: 777–778
- Islamic calendar: 801–802
- Japanese calendar: Ōei 6 (応永６年)
- Javanese calendar: 1313–1314
- Julian calendar: 1399; MCCCXCIX
- Korean calendar: 3732
- Minguo calendar: 513 before ROC 民前513年
- Nanakshahi calendar: −69
- Thai solar calendar: 1941–1942
- Tibetan calendar: ས་ཕོ་སྟག་ལོ་ (male Earth-Tiger); 1525 or 1144 or 372 — to — ས་མོ་ཡོས་ལོ་ (female Earth-Hare); 1526 or 1145 or 373

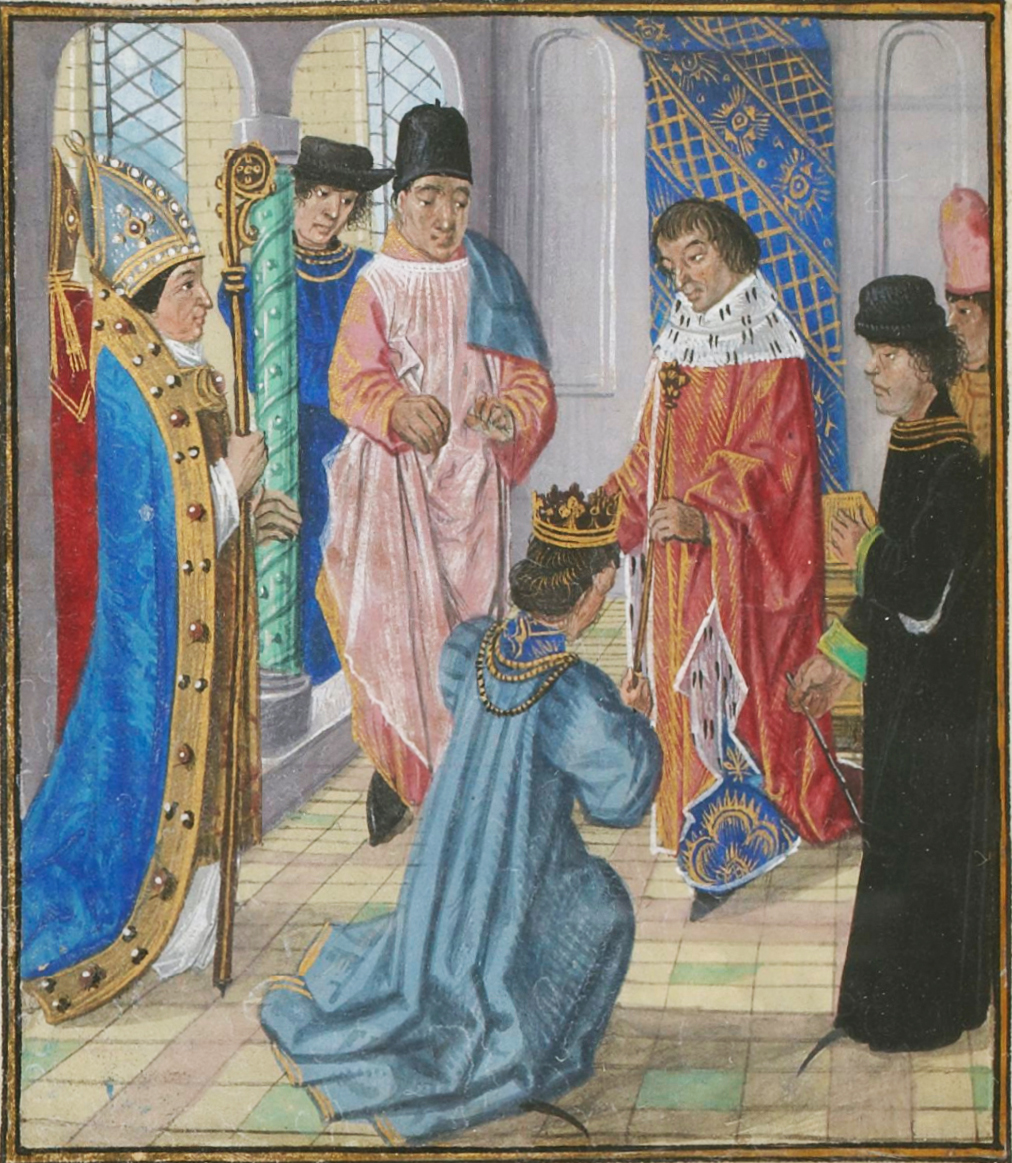
September 29: King Richard II of England, taken prisoner by the rebel Henry Bolingbroke, abdicates and presents his crown to the new King Henry IV.

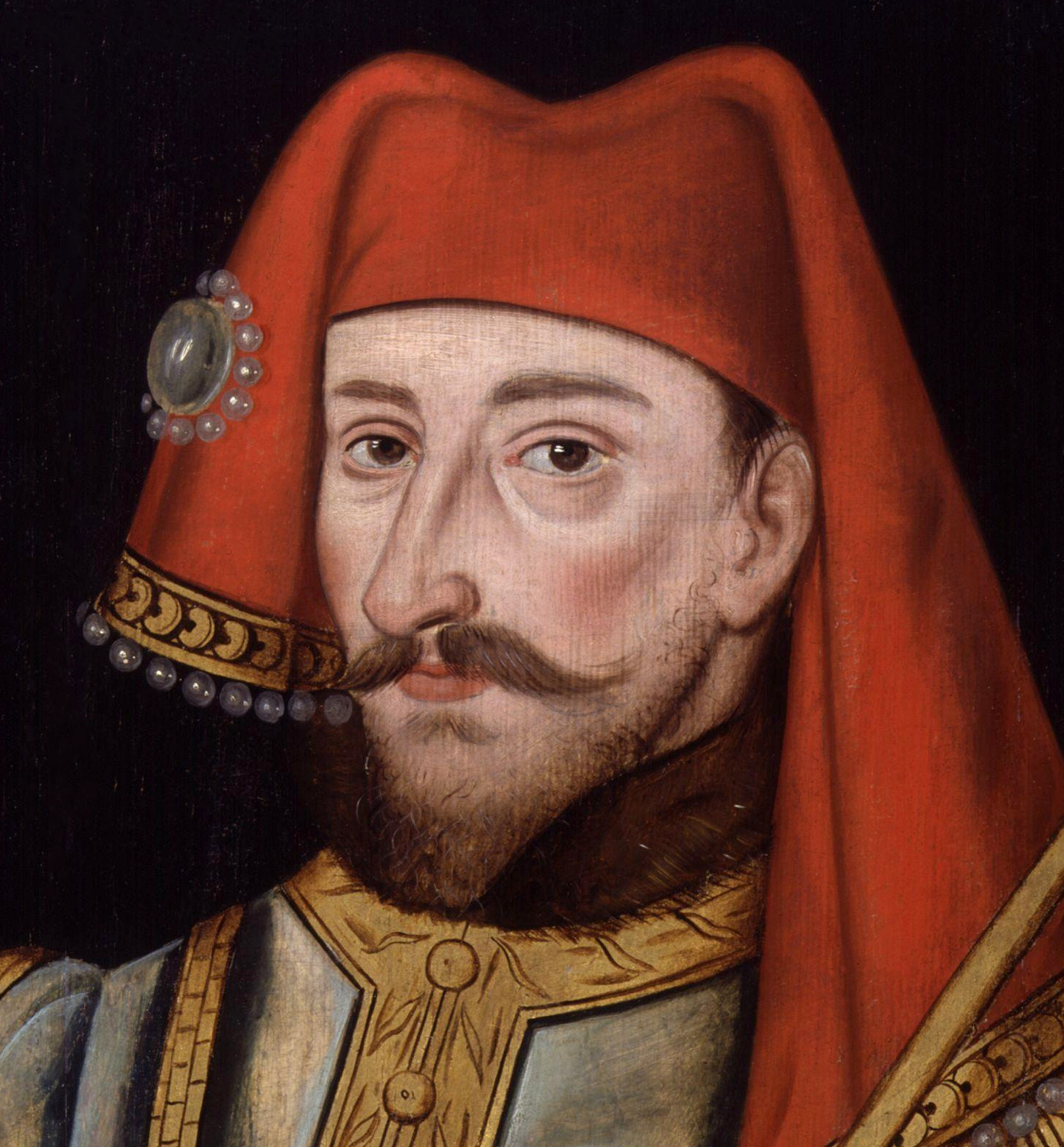
Henry IV of England

Year 1399 (MCCCXCIX) was a common year starting on Wednesday of the Julian calendar.

== Events ==
=== January–March ===
- January 13 – In the Delhi Sultanate in what is now the Uttarakhand state of India, Timur the Lame captures and sacks Haridwar.
- February 3 – John of Gaunt, Duke of Aquitaine uncle of King Richard II of England and father of Henry Bolingbroke, dies and King Richard becomes ruler of the Duchy.
- February 19 – The Principality of Piombino is formed after Prince Gherardo Appiani sells the city of Pisa to the Duchy of Milan for 200,000 florins and possession of five cities and three islands (including Elba).
- March 18 – Richard II of England cancels the legal documents allowing the exiled Henry Bolingbroke to inherit his father's lands, leading to Henry's decision to overthrow King Richard.

=== April–June ===
- April 13 – The coronation of Martin of Aragon as King takes place in Barcelona. His wife Maria de Luna is crowned as the Queen consort takes place on April 23.
- May 3 – Pope Boniface IX of Rome excommunicates Onorato Caetani, Great Constable of the Kingdom of Naples, who had previously been excommunicated in 1367 by Pope Urban V of Rome, and then was forgiven in 1378 by Pope Clement VII of Avignon. Boniface's action follows Caetani's continued support of the Avignon papacy, after which a crusade against Caetani's properties at Fondi.
- May 10 – The Treaty of Tarbes is signed between representatives of King Charles VI of France and Archambaud of Grailly, who has been an ally of the French monarch's enemy, King Richard II of England. Under the treaty, de Grailly is made Count of Foix in southern France, in return for breaking his alliance with King Richard. Two of the Count of Foix's sons are sent as hostages to the Royal Court of France in order to secure the terms of the agreement.
- June 20 – An-Nasir Faraj becomes the Sultan of Egypt upon the death of his father, the Sultan Sayf ad-Din Barquq.
- June 21 – Egyptian prince Saad al-Din bin Ghurab becomes the Amir al-umara of Egypt.

=== July–September ===
- July 4 – While Richard II of England is away on a military campaign in Ireland, Henry Bolingbroke, with exiled former archbishop of Canterbury Thomas Arundel as an advisor, returns to England and begins a military campaign to reclaim his confiscated lands.
- July 10 – Ladislaus regains the throne of the Kingdom of Naples, after King Louis II of Anjou and his army have left the city to suppress a rebllion in Apulia.
- July 17 – Władysław II Jagiełło becomes sole ruler of Poland, after the death of his co-ruling wife, Queen Jadwiga.
- August 6 – Prince of Yan (Zhu Di) of China starts a rebellion, the Jingnan campaign in Beijing against his nephew, the Emperor Zhu Yunwen, after two of Zhu Di's officials are arrested for "subversive activity".
- August 12 – At the Battle of the Vorskla River, Golden Horde forces, led by Mongol Khan Temür Qutlugh and Emir Edigu, annihilate a crusading army led by former Golden Horde Khan Tokhtamysh, and Grand Duke Vytautas of Lithuania..
- August 19 – Richard II of England is taken prisoner by Henry Bolingbroke upon his return from Ireland and surrenders at Flint Castle in return for his life.
- September 1 – Richard II, though still nominally the King of England, is imprisoned by Henry Bolingbroke at the Tower of London.
- September 30 – King Richard II of England surrenders his crown to Henry Bolingbroke at an assembly of the House of Lords at Westminster Hall in London, where articles of desposition are read to him by the Archbishop of Canterbury. King Richard abdicates, and the Lords proclaim Bolingbroke as King Henry IV.

=== October–December ===
- October 13 – Henry Bolingborke is crowned as King Henry IV of England at Westminster Abbey.
- October 19 – Thomas Arundel is formally restored as Archbishop of Canterbury by King Henry, replacing Roger Walden, who had been installed by King Richard II upon Arundel's dismissal in 1397.
- November 1 – At Nantes, Jean V of the House of Montfort begins his reign of 43 years as the Duke of Brittany (Bretagne), an independent duchy that is now part of France, upon the death of his father, Jean IV.
- November 28 – At Suceava (now in Romania), Iuga Voda Ologul becomes prince of Moldavia
- December 10 – Manuel II Palaiologos, The Emperor of Byzantium, departs from Constantinople along with French General Jean II Le Maingre (known as Boucicaut) and a ships of the Venetian navy on a diplomatic mission to obtain military aid, traveling first to the Republic of Venice to negotiate with the Doge Antonio Venier.

=== Date unknown ===
- Sultan Bayezid I of the Ottoman Empire invades Mamluk-occupied Syria. A rift forms between Sultan Bayezid and Timur of the Timurid Empire, who also wanted to conquer Syria.
- The Principality of Achaea (now southern Greece) resists an invasion by the Ottoman Empire.

== Births ==
- March 16 – Xuande Emperor of China (d. 1435)
- June 26 – John, Count of Angoulême (d. 1467)
- date unknown
  - William II Canynges, English merchant (approximate date; d. 1474)
  - Zara Yaqob, Emperor of Ethiopia (d. 1468)
  - Rogier van der Weyden, Dutch painter (or 1400)

== Deaths ==
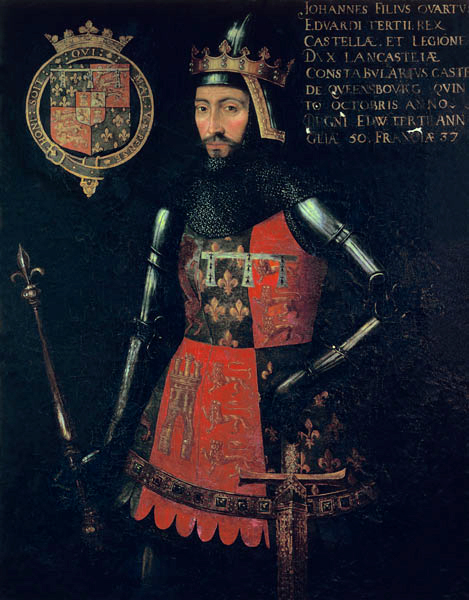
John of Gaunt died 3 February

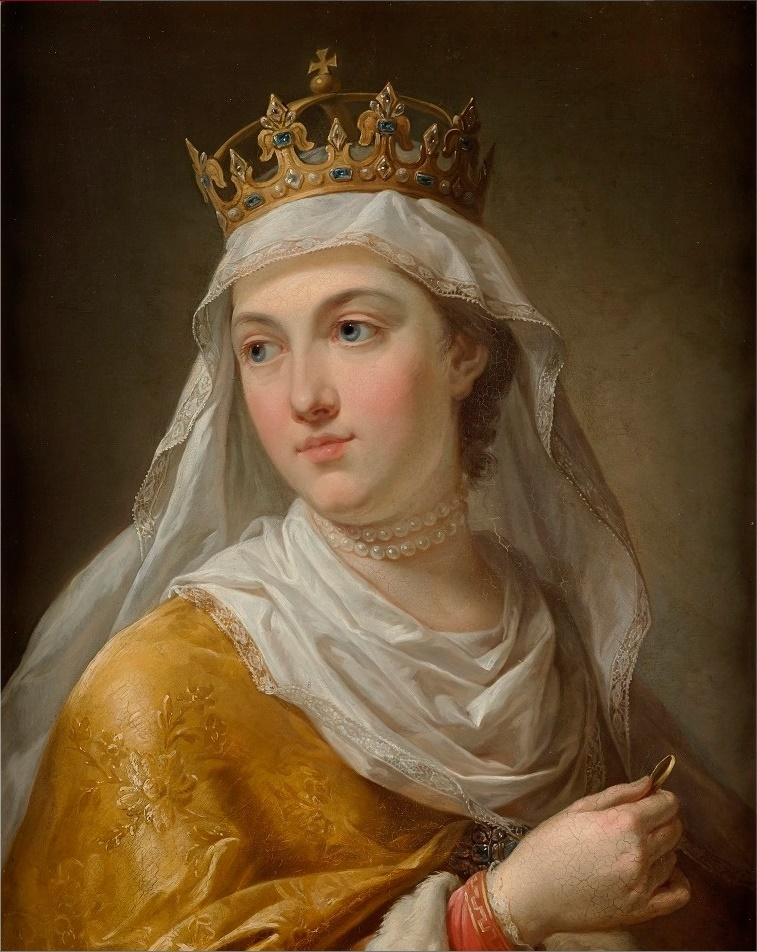
Jadwiga of Poland died 17 July

- January 4 – Nicholas Eymerich, Catalan theologian and inquisitor
- February 3 – John of Gaunt, 1st Duke of Lancaster, English prince (b. 1340)
- March 24 – Margaret, Duchess of Norfolk (b. c. 1320)
- July 13 – Peter Parler, German architect (b. 1330)
- July 17 – King Jadwiga of Poland (b. 1374)
- August 12 – Demetrius I Starshy, Prince of Trubczewsk (in battle) (b. 1327)
- August 15 – Ide Pedersdatter Falk, Danish noblewoman (b. 1358)
- August 26 – Mikhail II, Grand Prince of Tver (b. 1333)
- September 22 – Thomas de Mowbray, 1st Duke of Norfolk, English politician (b. 1366)
- October 3 – Eleanor de Bohun, English noble (b. c.1366)
- October 5 – Raymond of Capua, Italian Dominic friar and venerated Christian (b. 1330)
- November 1 – Duke John IV of Brittany (b. 1339)
- date unknown
  - Spytek z Melsztyna, Polish nobleman
  - William le Scrope, 1st Earl of Wiltshire (b. 1350)
  - Sultan Barquq of Egypt
  - Trần Ngung, former ruler of Trần dynasty Vietnam (forced to commit suicide)
  - Stephen I of Moldavia
