= Henry of Carinthia =

Henry of Carinthia may refer to:

== Dukes of Carinthia ==
- Henry III, Duke of Bavaria, also Duke of Carinthia (976–978, 985–989)
- Henry II, Duke of Bavaria, also Duke of Carinthia (989–995)
- Henry II, Holy Roman Emperor, also Duke of Carinthia (995–1002)
- Henry III, Holy Roman Emperor, also Duke of Carinthia (1039–1047)
- Henry of Eppenstein, Duke of Carinthia (1090–1122)
- Henry IV, Duke of Carinthia (1122–1123)
- Henry V, Duke of Carinthia (1144–1161)
- Henry of Bohemia, also Duke of Carinthia (1310–1335)

== Other ==
- Henry of Carinthia (bishop) (died 1169), bishop of Troyes
