= Abu Bakr ibn Faris =

Marinid Sultan from 1358 to 1359

Marinid Sultan
- Reign: 1358 – 1359
- Predecessor: Muhammad II ibn Faris
- Successor: Ibrahim ibn Ali
- Died: 1359
- Dynasty: Marinid
- Religion: Islam

Abu Bakr ibn Faris, Abu Yahya (Arabic: أبو بكر الثاني المريني), was Marinid Sultan from 1358 to 1359.

== Life ==
Abu Bakr ibn Faris assumed the throne in 1358 succeeding Muhammad II ibn Faris. He was in turn succeeded by Ibrahim ibn Ali in 1359.
