= Chinese famine of 1333–1337 =

Famine in China

The Chinese famine of 1333–1337 was a famine resulting from a series of climatic disasters in China, then under Toghon Temür of Yuan dynasty. The famine was aggravated by pestilence laying the whole country to waste.

== Causes ==
Between 1333 and 1336 China suffered a drought and renewed floods, as well as many uncommon atmospheric phenomena. Regions around the Kiang and Hoai rivers were affected. In 1333 rain fell in torrents in and about Kingsai. In 1334, floodings occurred in the neighbourhood of Canton.

== Casualties and aftermath ==
An estimated 6 million people perished by the famine. About 4 million people perished in Kiang, according to the Chinese annals. Around this time, pestilence ravaged the region, being antecedent of the Black Death in Europe, which appeared in the following decade.

== See also ==
- Black Death
