= Cadzand =

- Village and seaside resort
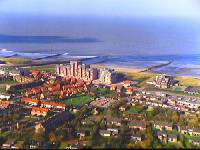
- Welkom in Bruinisse (Welcome to Bruinisse)

- Flag Coat of arms

- Location in the province of Zeeland in the Netherlands Cadzand (Netherlands)
- Coordinates: 51°22′4″N 3°24′29″E
- Country: Netherlands
- Province: Zeeland
- Municipality: Sluis

Area
  - Total: 14.95 km^{2} (5.77 sq mi)
- Elevation: 1.4 m (4.6 ft)

Population (2021)
  - Total: 735
  - Density: 49.2/km^{2} (127/sq mi)
- Time zone: UTC+1 (CET)
  - Summer (DST): UTC+2 (CEST)
- Postal code: 4506
- Dialing code: 0117

Cadzand is a village in the Dutch province of Zeeland. It is located in the municipality of Sluis, about 8 km northwest of Oostburg. The village contains 790 inhabitants (2010). Better known to many visitors is the nearby beach at Cadzand-Bad.

Cadzand was the scene of two battles during the Hundred Years' War

- 1337-Battle of Cadzand
- 1387-Battle of Margate

Under the Secret Treaty of Dover, concluded in 1670 between Charles II of England and Louis XIV of France, England was supposed to get possession of Cadzand as well as Walcheren, as the reward for helping France in the then impending war against the Dutch Republic. In the event, the Dutch resistance - much stronger than anticipated - managed to repulse the French-English attack, and the treaty was not implemented.

In 1685 Cadzand was an important station on the escape route of Jean Harlan, a Huguenot from Calais, who escaped after Louis XIV's Revocation of the Edict of Nantes, reached Cadzand in a small boat and eventually founded a successful merchant family in Germany. Cadzand was also an important destination that year and shortly thereafter for other Huguenot refugees from the Calais area when their temple at Guinness was demolished by royal decree in the summer of that year. Three in particular were the Morel brothers, Isaac, Jacob and Pierre (changed to Pieter after moving to Cadzand), and the two brothers Jacob and Isaac Van Houte. All five "had been large landowners at Guemps, Offequerque, Hames, and Andres, close to Calais." Similar to a sister church in Canterbury, Kent, England, they helped re-build in Cadzand the mother church they lost in Guinness, Calais.

During the year 1847 a large exodus of people from Cadzand, occurred, mainly to the United States. One ship, the "bark Maria", carried within it that year a significant number of Cadzanders, like Isaac LeMahieu and Suzanne Morel.

Until 1 April 1970, Cadzand was a separate municipality. It then was annexed by the municipality of Oostburg. It was in January 2003, with the merger of Sluis-Aardenburg and Oostburg, that Cadzand found itself within the newly enlarged municipality of Sluis.

== In popular culture ==
The 2023 Belgian-Flemish television series Knokke Off was partially set on a camping site in Cadzand.

== Gallery ==
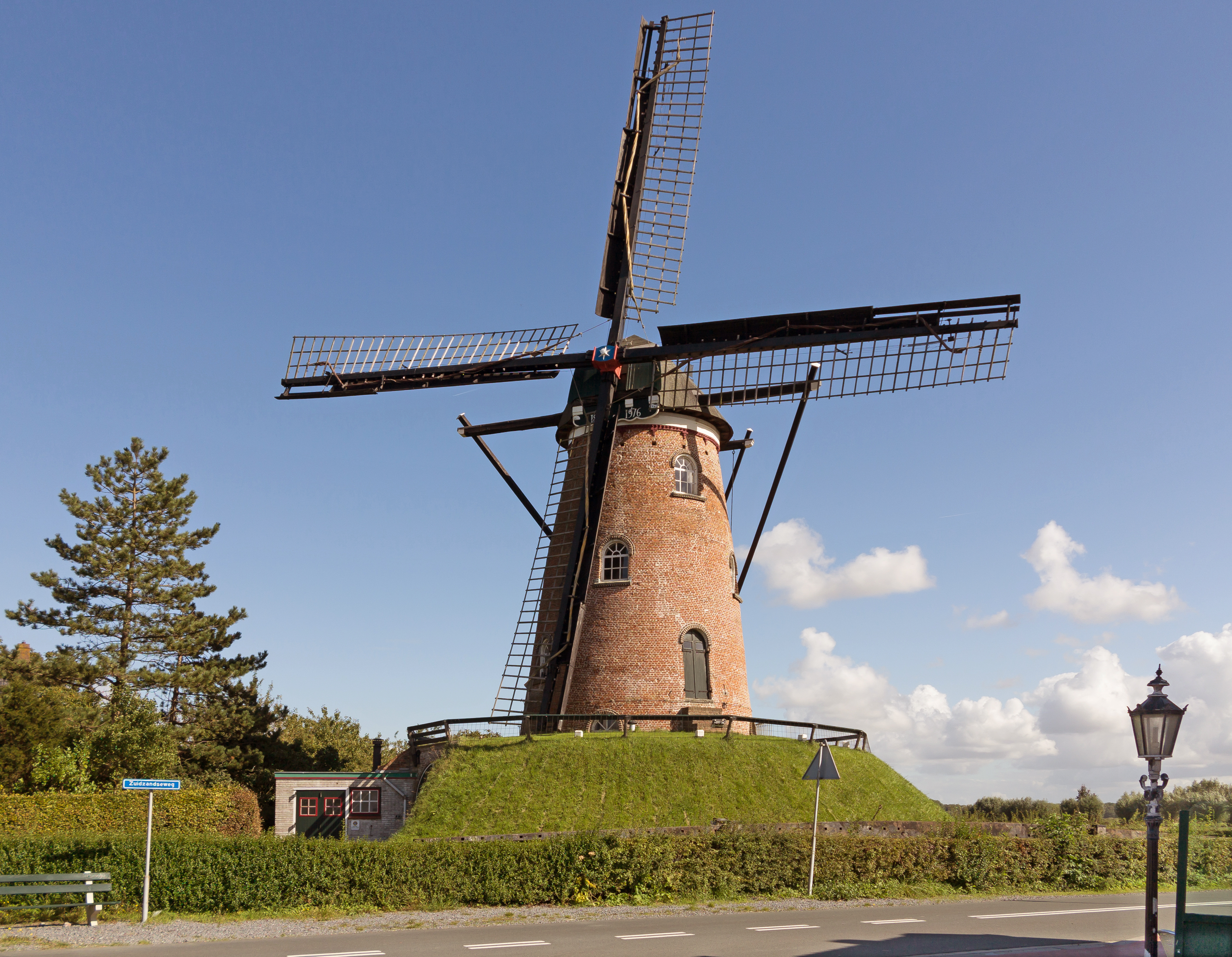
Windmill: beltmolen Nooit Gedacht

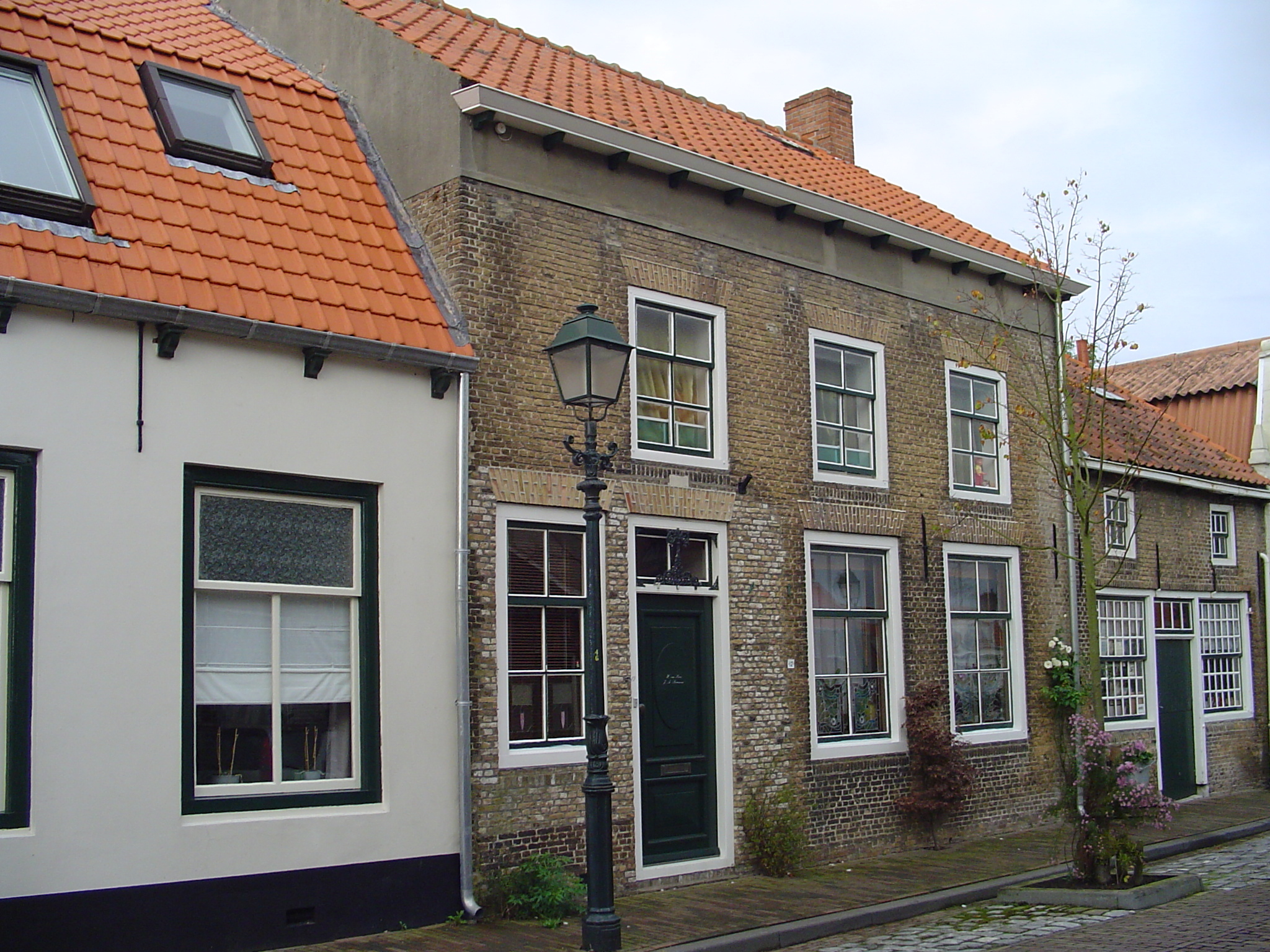
House in Cadzand

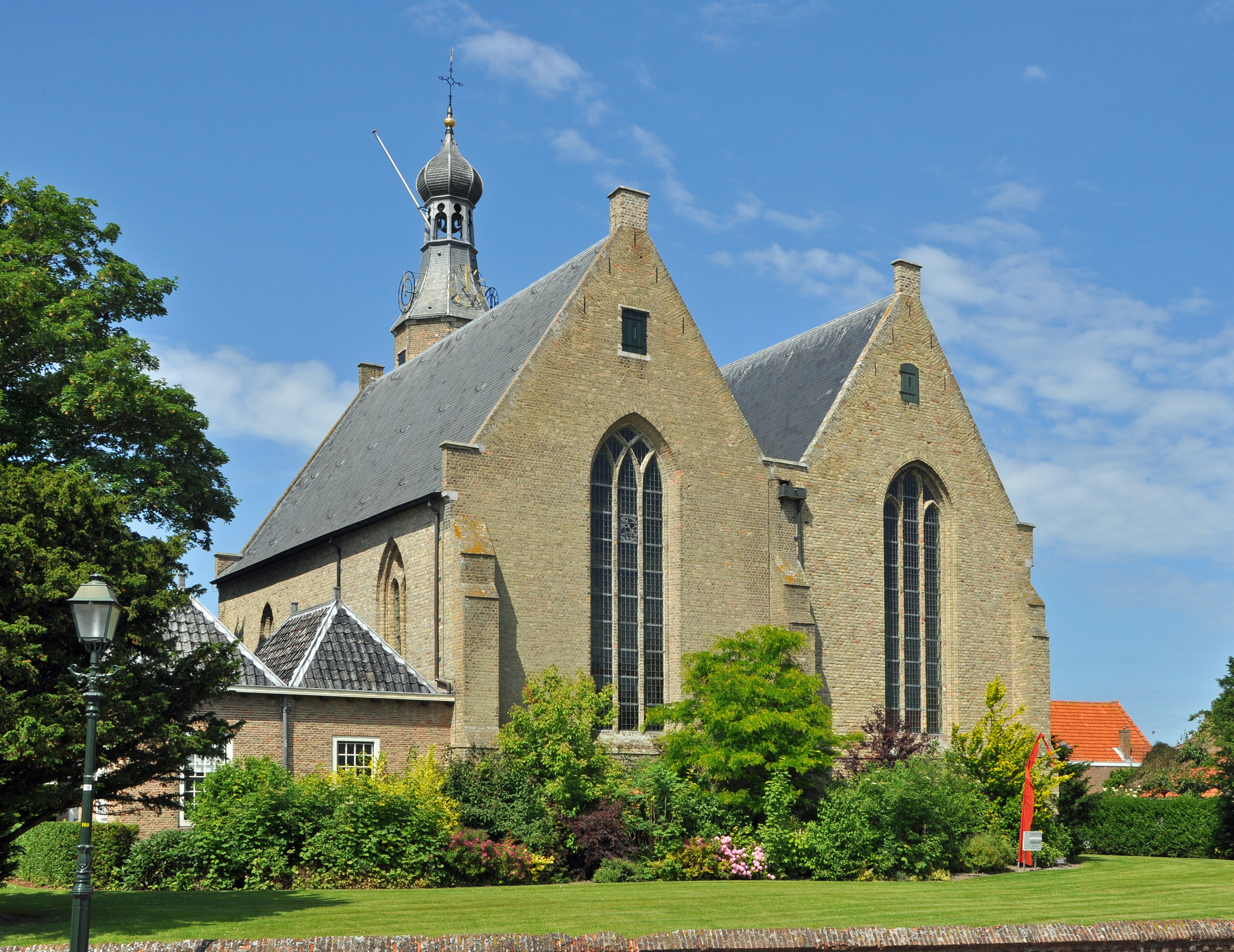
Maria Church

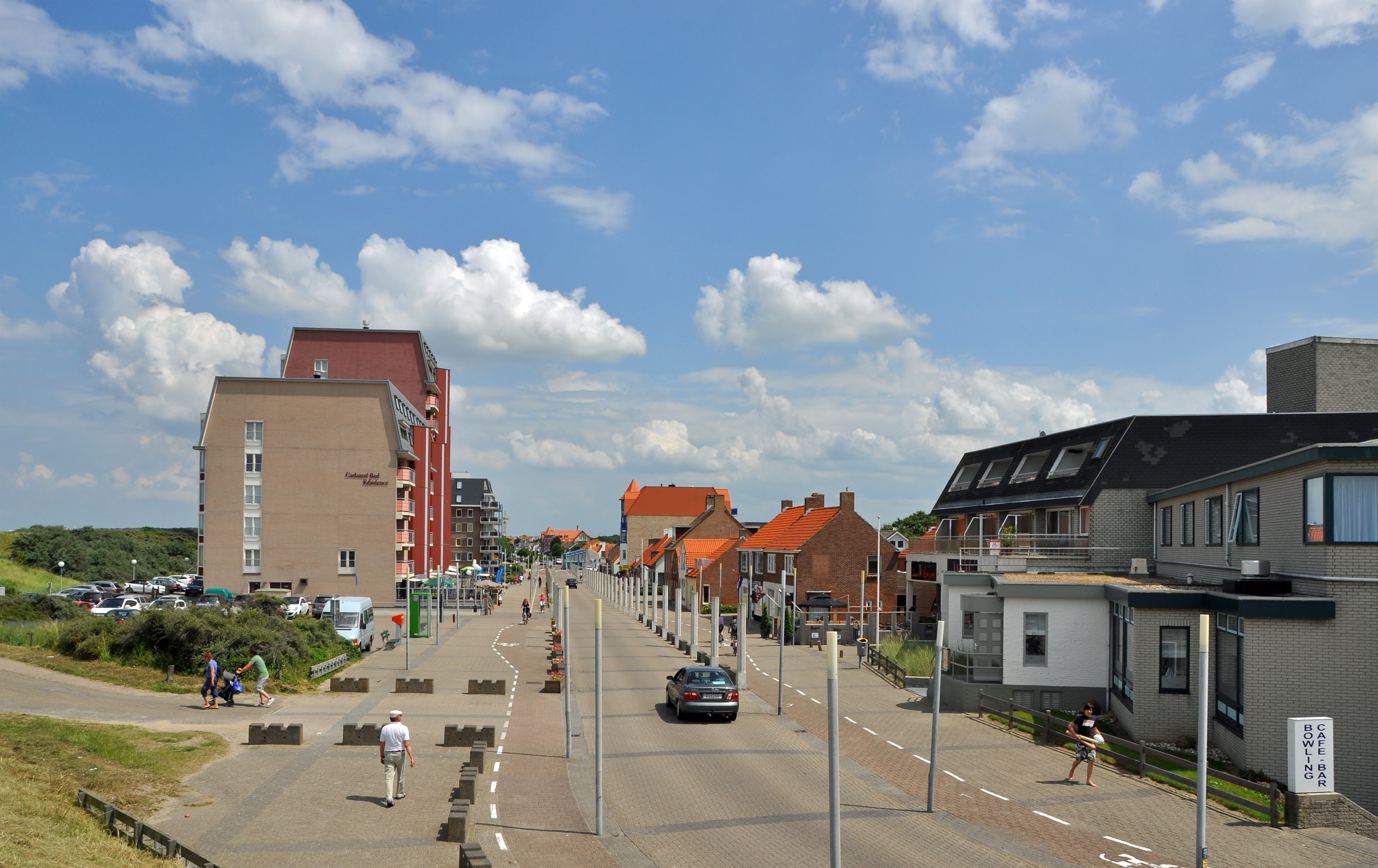
Cadzand-Bad
