= List of shoguns =

This article is a list of shoguns that ruled Japan intermittently, as part of the military aristocratic feudal class from the beginning of the Asuka period in 709 until the end of the Tokugawa shogunate in 1868. (Note: The Tokugawa shogunate came to its official end on 9 November 1867, when Tokugawa Yoshinobu "put his prerogatives at the Emperor's disposal" and resigned 10 days later. This was effectively the "restoration" (Taisei Hōkan) of imperial rule – although Yoshinobu still had significant influence and it was not until 3 January 1868, with the Emperor's edict, that the Meiji Restoration fully occurred. On that day, the Emperor stripped Yoshinobu of all power and made a formal declaration of the restoration of his power.)

== Asuka / Heian periods (709–1184) ==
Note: there are different shogun titles. For example, Kose no Maro had the title of Mutsu Chintō Shōgun (陸奥鎮東将軍; lit. "Great General of Subduing Mutsu"). Ki no Kosami had the title of Seitō Taishōgun (征東大将軍; lit. "Commander-in-chief for the pacification of the East") in 789 which is less important than Sei-i Taishōgun. Ōtomo no Otomaro was the first person who was granted the title of Seii Taishōgun (征夷大将軍; lit. "Great appeasing general of the barbarians"). Sakanoue no Tamuramaro was the second, and Minamoto no Yoritomo was third person who had the title of Sei-i Taishōgun.

No.	Portrait	Name (Birth–Death)	Shogun from	Shogun until
1		Kose no Maro	709	
2		Tajihi no Agatamori	720	721
3		Ōtomo no Yakamochi (c. 718–785)	784	785
4		Ki no Kosami	788	789
5		Ōtomo no Otomaro (731–809)	793	794
6		Sakanoue no Tamuramaro (758–811)	797	808
7		Funya no Watamaro (765–823)	811	816
8		Fujiwara no Tadabumi (873–947)	940	
9		Minamoto no Yoshinaka (1154–1184)	1184	

== Kamakura shogunate (1192–1333) ==
No.	Portrait	Name (Birth–Death)	Shogun from	Shogun until
1		Minamoto no Yoritomo (1147–1199)	1192	1199
2		Minamoto no Yoriie (1182–1204)	1202	1203
3		Minamoto no Sanetomo (1192–1219)	1203	1219
4		Kujō Yoritsune (1218–1256)	1226	1244
5		Kujō Yoritsugu (1239–1256)	1244	1252
6		Prince Munetaka (1242–1274)	1252	1266
7		Prince Koreyasu (1264–1326)	1266	1289
8		Prince Hisaaki (1276–1328)	1289	1308
9		Prince Morikuni (1301–1333)	1308	1333

== Kenmu Restoration (1333–1336) ==
No.	Portrait	Name (Birth–Death)	Shogun from	Shogun until
1		Prince Moriyoshi (1308–1335)	1333	
2		Prince Narinaga (1326 – c. 1337–44)	1335	1336

== Ashikaga shogunate (1336–1573) ==
No.	Portrait	Name (Birth–Death)	Shogun from	Shogun until
1		Ashikaga Takauji (1305–1358)	1338	1358
2		Ashikaga Yoshiakira (1330–1367)	1359	1367
3		Ashikaga Yoshimitsu (1358–1408)	1369	de jure 1395
3		Ashikaga Yoshimitsu (1358–1408)	1369	de facto 1408
4		Ashikaga Yoshimochi (1386–1428)	1395	de jure 1423
4		Ashikaga Yoshimochi (1386–1428)	1395	de facto 1428
5		Ashikaga Yoshikazu (1407–1425)	1423	1425
6		Ashikaga Yoshinori (1394–1441)	1429	1441
7		Ashikaga Yoshikatsu (1434–1443)	1442	1443
8		Ashikaga Yoshimasa (1436–1490)	1449	de jure 1474
8		Ashikaga Yoshimasa (1436–1490)	1449	de facto 1490
9		Ashikaga Yoshihisa (1465–1489)	1474	1489
10		Ashikaga Yoshitane (1466–1523)	1490	1493
11		Ashikaga Yoshizumi (1481–1511)	1495	1508
(10)		Ashikaga Yoshitane (1466–1523)	1508	1522
12		Ashikaga Yoshiharu (1511–1550)	1522	de jure 1547
12		Ashikaga Yoshiharu (1511–1550)	1522	de facto 1550
13		Ashikaga Yoshiteru (1536–1565)	1547	1565
14		Ashikaga Yoshihide (1538–1568)	1568	
15		Ashikaga Yoshiaki (1537–1597)	1568	deposed 1573
15		Ashikaga Yoshiaki (1537–1597)	1568	abdicated 1588

== Azuchi–Momoyama period (1568–1600) ==
No.	Portrait	Name (Birth–Death)	de facto shogun from	de facto shogun until
1		Oda Nobunaga (1535–1582)	1568	de jure 1575
1		Oda Nobunaga (1535–1582)	1568	de facto 1582
2		Oda Nobutada (1557–1582)	1575	1582
3		Oda Hidenobu (1580–1605)	1582	1583
1		Toyotomi Hideyoshi (1537–1598)	1585	de jure 1592
1		Toyotomi Hideyoshi (1537–1598)	1585	de facto 1598
2		Toyotomi Hidetsugu (1568–1595)	1592	1595
3		Toyotomi Hideyori (1593–1615)	1598	de jure 1603

From 1598 to 1600, the de facto shogunate was delegated to the Council of Five Elders.

== Tokugawa shogunate (1600–1868) ==
No.	Portrait	Name (Birth–Death)	Shogun from	Shogun until
1		Tokugawa Ieyasu (1543–1616)	de facto 1600	de jure 1605
1		Tokugawa Ieyasu (1543–1616)	de jure 1603	de facto 1616
2		Tokugawa Hidetada (1579–1632)	1605	de jure 1623
2		Tokugawa Hidetada (1579–1632)	1605	de facto 1632
3		Tokugawa Iemitsu (1604–1651)	1623	1651
4		Tokugawa Ietsuna (1641–1680)	1651	1680
5		Tokugawa Tsunayoshi (1646–1709)	1680	1709
6		Tokugawa Ienobu (1662–1712)	1709	1712
7		Tokugawa Ietsugu (1709–1716)	1713	1716
8		Tokugawa Yoshimune (1684–1751)	1716	de jure 1745
8		Tokugawa Yoshimune (1684–1751)	1716	de facto 1751
9		Tokugawa Ieshige (1712–1761)	1745	de jure 1760
9		Tokugawa Ieshige (1712–1761)	1745	de facto 1761
10		Tokugawa Ieharu (1737–1786)	1760	1786
11		Tokugawa Ienari (1773–1841)	1787	de jure 1837
11		Tokugawa Ienari (1773–1841)	1787	de facto 1841
12		Tokugawa Ieyoshi (1793–1853)	1837	1853
13		Tokugawa Iesada (1824–1858)	1853	1858
14		Tokugawa Iemochi (1846–1866)	1858	1866
15		Tokugawa Yoshinobu (1837–1913)	1866	1867

== See also ==
- Emperor of Japan
  - List of emperors of Japan
- History of Japan
- Daimyo
- Han system
  - Abolition of the han system

== Bibliography ==
- Friday, Karl (2007). The First Samurai: The Life and Legend of the Warrior Rebel, Taira Masakado. John Wiley and Sons. ISBN 0-471-76082-X.
