= 1330s in England =

Events from the 1330s in England.

== Incumbents ==
- Monarch – Edward III

== Events ==
- 1330
  - 11–21 March – Parliament of England meets at York.
  - 19 March – Edmund of Woodstock, Earl of Kent is executed on the orders of the regent Roger Mortimer because he plotted to free the former King Edward II of England (who is dead since September 1327).
  - 19 October – King Edward III of England starts his personal reign, arresting his regent Roger Mortimer.
  - 26 November–9 December – Parliament of England meets.
  - 29 November – execution of Roger Mortimer, 1st Earl of March.
  - Approximate date of completion of the tower and spire of Salisbury Cathedral.
- 1331
  - Butchers' Guild granted the right to regulate the meat trade in the City of London.
- 1332
  - 14 January – Sir Richard de Willoughby, Chief Justice of the King's Bench, is captured in the East Midlands and ransomed by the Coterel and Folville gangs.
  - 10–11 August – Second War of Scottish Independence: Edward Balliol, pretender to the Scottish throne, and his English allies defeat troops loyal to Robert the Bruce at the Battle of Dupplin Moor.
  - 16 December – Second War of Scottish Independence: Balliol forced to flee to England after the Battle of Annan.
  - Knelle Dam diverts course of River Rother, East Sussex, north of the Isle of Oxney.
- 1333
  - 25 March – Second War of Scottish Independence: An English victory over the Scots at the Battle of Dornock.
  - May – Second War of Scottish Independence: David II of Scotland flees to France allowing his rival Balliol to recognise Edward III as overlord. Balliol cedes Berwick-upon-Tweed and eight Southern Scottish counties to Edward.
  - May – Second War of Scottish Independence: Balliol, with English support, besieges Berwick.
  - 8 June – Edward III seizes the Isle of Man from Scottish control.
  - 19 July – Second War of Scottish Independence: A decisive English victory over the Scots is won at the Battle of Halidon Hill, and Berwick falls.
  - 3 November – John de Stratford enthroned as Archbishop of Canterbury.
  - November – following violence between masters at the University of Oxford, a group of them migrates to Stamford, Lincolnshire, and attempts to set up a university there. In August 1334, the Chancellor of Oxford obtains a royal writ to suppress it, and it is closed in summer 1335.
- 1334
  - February – Second War of Scottish Independence: Edward Balliol cedes Berwick to England.
  - June – Second War of Scottish Independence: Balliol cedes the counties of southern Scotland to England and recognises Edward III as his overlord.
  - September – Second War of Scottish Independence: English armies enter southern Scotland to put down rebellions.
- 1335
  - 30 July – Second War of Scottish Independence: Scottish victory over the English at the Battle of Boroughmuir.
  - 30 November – Second War of Scottish Independence: Robert the Bruce loyalists win a victory over Edward Balliol and his English allies at the Battle of Culblean.
  - Parliament meets in York; subsequently it will normally meet at Westminster (London).
  - John Grandisson, Bishop of Exeter, establishes The King's School, Ottery St Mary (Devon) as a College of Secular Canons.
- 1336
  - 21–22 July – English troops burn Aberdeen in Scotland.
  - August – England bans wool exports to Flanders.
  - September – Parliament votes for taxes to fund a war against France.
  - Sumptuary law regulates dress according to the wearer's social class.
- 1337
  - 17 March – Edward, the Black Prince is created Duke of Cornwall, becoming the first English Duke, and is granted the Forest of Dartmoor, much of which remains as part of the Duchy of Cornwall into the 21st century.
  - 24 May – Philip VI of France confiscates Gascony from English control.
  - August – English forces relieve Stirling Castle, ending Edward III's last Scottish campaign.
  - October – Edward III formally rejects Philip VI's claim to the French throne, initiating the first phase of the Hundred Years' War.
  - November – Battle of Cadzand: English troops raid the Flemish island of Cadzand.
  - Bisham Priory founded.
  - Rebuilding of Gloucester Abbey in perpendicular style begins.
- 1338
  - 24 March – Hundred Years' War: English Channel naval campaign, 1338–1339 – Philip VI of France's navy under Nicolas Béhuchet attacks and burns Portsmouth.
  - July – Edward III issues the Walton Ordinances at Walton-on-the-Naze, giving emergency powers to royal officials in order to raise funds for the war effort.
  - 5 September – Hundred Years' War: Louis IV, Holy Roman Emperor appoints Edward III a vicar-general of the Holy Roman Empire. Louis supports Edward's claim to the French throne under the terms of the Treaty of Koblenz.
  - 5 October – Hundred Years' War: English Channel naval campaign, 1338–1339 – The French and their allies attack and burn Southampton.
- 1339
  - The French fleet raids Dover and Folkestone.
  - 3 December – Hundred Years' War: England allies with Flanders against the French.

== Births ==
- 1330
  - 15 June – Edward, the Black Prince, son of Edward III of England (died 1376)
  - John Gower, English poet (died 1410)
- 1332
  - William Langland, poet (died 1400)

== Deaths ==
- 1330
  - 19 March – Edmund of Woodstock, 1st Earl of Kent, son of Edward I and brother of Edward II, (executed by Roger Mortimer) (born 1301)
  - 29 November – Roger Mortimer, 1st Earl of March, de facto ruler of England (born 1287)
- 1332
  - 20 July – Thomas Randolph, 1st Earl of Moray, regent of Scotland
  - Adam de Brome, founder of Oriel College, Oxford
- 1336
  - 23 May – Richard of Wallingford, mathematician and Abbot of St. Albans (born 1292)
- 1338
  - August – Thomas of Brotherton, 1st Earl of Norfolk (b. 1300)
- 1339
  - Henry de Cobham, 1st Baron Cobham, Lord Warden of the Cinque Ports (born 1260)
