= 1336 =

1336 in various calendars
- Gregorian calendar: 1336; MCCCXXXVI
- Ab urbe condita: 2089
- Armenian calendar: 785; ԹՎ ՉՁԵ
- Assyrian calendar: 6086
- Balinese saka calendar: 1257–1258
- Bengali calendar: 742–743
- Berber calendar: 2286
- English Regnal year: 9 Edw. 3 – 10 Edw. 3
- Buddhist calendar: 1880
- Burmese calendar: 698
- Byzantine calendar: 6844–6845
- Chinese calendar: 乙亥年 (Wood Pig); 4033 or 3826 — to — 丙子年 (Fire Rat); 4034 or 3827
- Coptic calendar: 1052–1053
- Discordian calendar: 2502
- Ethiopian calendar: 1328–1329
- Hebrew calendar: 5096–5097
- Hindu calendars
- Vikram Samvat: 1392–1393
- Shaka Samvat: 1257–1258
- Kali Yuga: 4436–4437
- Holocene calendar: 11336
- Igbo calendar: 336–337
- Iranian calendar: 714–715
- Islamic calendar: 736–737
- Japanese calendar: Shōkei 5 (正慶５年)
- Javanese calendar: 1248–1249
- Julian calendar: 1336; MCCCXXXVI
- Korean calendar: 3669
- Minguo calendar: 576 before ROC 民前576年
- Nanakshahi calendar: −132
- Thai solar calendar: 1878–1879
- Tibetan calendar: ཤིང་མོ་ཕག་ལོ་ (female Wood-Boar); 1462 or 1081 or 309 — to — མེ་ཕོ་བྱི་བ་ལོ་ (male Fire-Rat); 1463 or 1082 or 310

Year 1336 (MCCCXXXVI) was a leap year starting on Monday of the Julian calendar.

== Events ==
- January 24 – Peter IV became king of Aragon.
- February 25
  - Rather than be taken captive by the Teutonic Knights, 4,000 defenders of Pilėnai, Lithuania commit mass suicide.
  - The Kenmu Restoration ends and the Muromachi period begins in Japan; start of the Nanboku-chō period.
- April 18 (unconfirmed) – Brothers Harihara and Bukka Raya found the Vijayanagara Empire on the southern part of the Deccan Plateau in South India.
- April 26 – The Ascent of Mount Ventoux is made by the Italian poet Petrarch: he claims to be the first since classical antiquity to climb a mountain for the view.
- May 19 – The governor of Baghdad, Oirat 'Ali Padsah, defeats Arpa Ke'un near Maraga, contributing to the disintegration of the Ilkhanate.
- July 4 – Battle of Minatogawa: Ashikaga Takauji defeats Japanese Imperial forces, under Kusunoki Masashige and Nitta Yoshisada.
- July 21–22 – Second War of Scottish Independence: Aberdeen, Scotland is burned by the English.
- July 21 – Magnus Eriksson was crowned king of both Norway and Sweden in Stockholm.
- September 20 – The reign of Emperor Kōmyō, second of the Ashikaga Pretenders to the Northern Court of Japan, begins.

== Births ==
- April 9 – Timur, founder of the Timurid Empire (d. 1405)
- April 23 – Olivier V de Clisson, "the butcher", Breton knight and constable of France (d. 1407)
- July 25 – Albert I of Bavaria (d. 1404)
- date unknown
  - Gao Qi, Chinese poet (d. 1374)
  - Cyprian, Metropolitan of Kiev (died 1406)
- probable
  - Stefan Uroš V, Emperor of the Serbs (d. 1371)

== Deaths ==
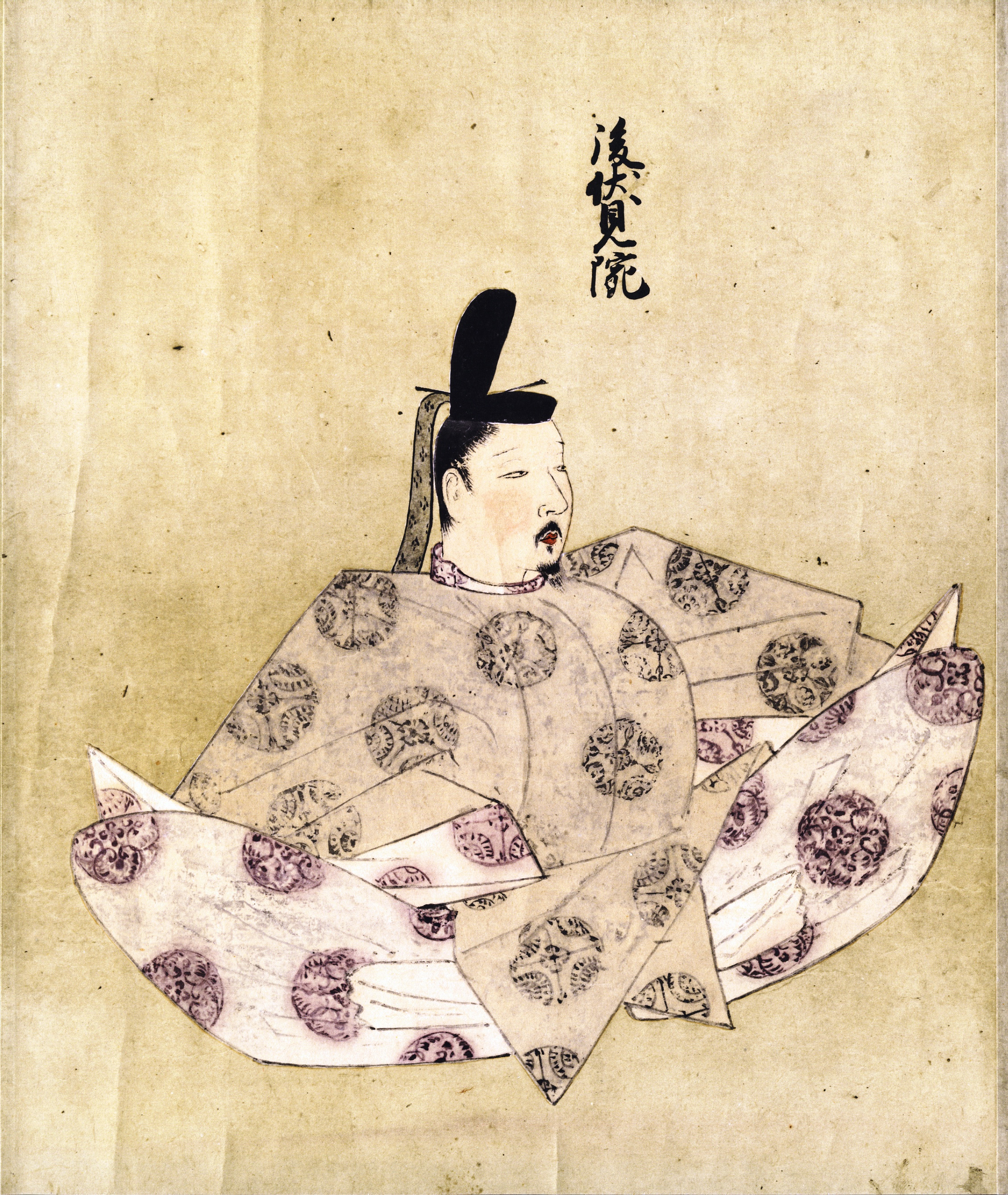
Emperor Go-Fushimi

- January 20 – John de Bohun, 5th Earl of Hereford (b. 1306)
- January 24 – Alfonso IV of Aragon (b. 1299)
- February 25 – Margiris, Duke of Samogitia
- March 20 – Maurice Csák, Hungarian Dominican friar (b. c. 1270)
- May 17 – Emperor Go-Fushimi of Japan (b. 1288)
- July 4 – Elizabeth of Portugal, queen consort and saint (b. 1271)
- September 5 – Charles d'Évreux (b. 1305)
- date unknown
  - Bernard VIII, Count of Comminges (b. c. 1285)
  - Arpa Ke'un, Ilkhanid ruler
  - Guillaume Pierre Godin, French Dominican philosopher (b. c. 1260)
  - Hugh II of Arborea
  - Ramon Muntaner, Catalan soldier and writer (b. 1270)
  - Cino da Pistoia, Italian poet (b. 1270)
  - Richard of Wallingford, English monk and mathematician (b. 1292)
  - Ghiyas al-Din ibn Rashid al-Din, Ilkhanate politician
  - Turgut Alp, Kayı and Ottoman soldier and commander in-chief.
