= 1597 in Scotland =

- Centuries: 14th; 15th; 16th; 17th; 18th
- Decades: 1570s; 1580s; 1590s; 1600s; 1610s
- See also: List of years in Scotland; Timeline of Scottish history 1597 in: England • Elsewhere

Events from the year 1597 in the Kingdom of Scotland.

== Incumbents ==
- Monarch – James VI

== Events ==
- 4 February – Battle of Logiebride, a skirmish between men of the Clan Mackenzie against those of the Clan Munro and the Bain family of Tulloch Castle.
- March–October – The Great Scottish Witch Hunt of 1597.
- 14 July – poet Alexander Montgomerie is declared an outlaw after the collapse of a Catholic plot.
- 17 July – George Heriot is appointed as goldsmith to the queen consort Anne of Denmark.
- 23 July – Earthquake in the Highlands.
- Lands of the Clan MacLeod are forfeit to the Crown.
- Scottish Poor Laws make parishes rather than the church responsible for the administration of poor relief.
- King James VI's Daemonologie is published.

== Births ==
- Sir Duncan Campbell of Auchinbreck, soldier (murdered 1645)
- Approximate date:
  - Robert Bethune (died 1660), 1st Laird of Bandon.
  - Lady Mary Erskine, Countess Marischal
  - Andrew Murray, 1st Lord Balvaird, minister (died 1644)

== Deaths ==
- 11 March – Henry Drummond, evangelical writer and lecturer
- 27 May – James Tyrie, Jesuit theologian (born 1543)
- Sir Thomas Maclellan of Bombie, Provost of Kirkcudbright

== See also ==
- Timeline of Scottish history
