= Siege of Inverness (1649) =

Scottish Civil War conflict

Coordinates: 57.4764°N 4.2253°W

- Part of Wars of the Three Kingdoms (Scottish Civil War)
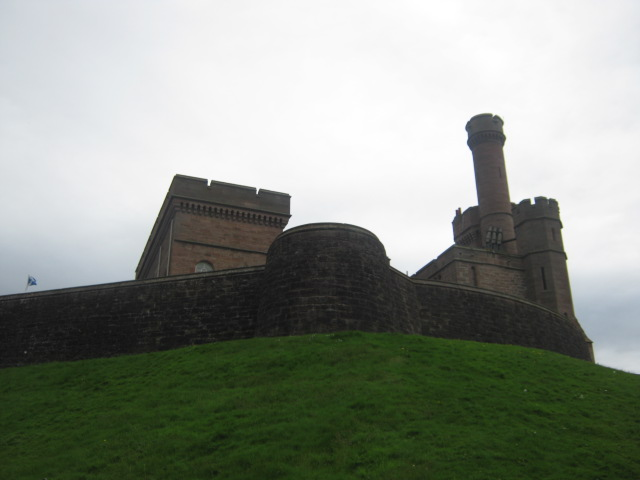
- Inverness Castle in modern times. Some of the old curtain wall can be seen in the foreground, while the castle building itself was rebuilt in 1836
Date	22 February 1649
Location	Inverness, Scotland
Result	Royalist victory

Belligerents
Royalists: Clan Fraser; Clan Munro; Clan Mackenzie; Clan Urquhart	Covenanters

Commanders and leaders
Col. Hugh Fraser; John Munro; Thomas Mackenzie; Sir Thomas Urquhart	Lord Newark

Strength
Unknown	Unknown

Casualties and losses
Unknown	Unknown

The siege of Inverness took place in 1649 as part of the 17th-century Scottish Civil War that was, in turn, part of the Wars of the Three Kingdoms.

On 5 February 1649, Charles II had been proclaimed king after his father's execution. It was decided that Charles and his allies who were in exile should again try to recover the kingdom, in connection with the plans of the exiled James Graham, 1st Marquess of Montrose. As a result a rising took place in the north of Scotland under Colonel Hugh Fraser, who was joined by John Munro of Lemlair, Thomas Mackenzie of Pluscarden and Sir Thomas Urquhart of Cromarty.

On 22 February they entered Inverness, where they expelled the garrison of Inverness Castle and afterwards demolished the walls and fortifications. On 26 February a council of war was held. Here they framed certain enactments by which they took the customs and excise of the six northern counties of Scotland into their own hands. Soon afterwards General David Leslie, Lord Newark was sent north to attack them. The clans then retreated from Inverness back into Ross-shire. Leslie placed a garrison in Chanonry Castle and terms of surrender were made between him and all of the clans except for the Mackenzies. As soon as Leslie left for the south, the Mackenzies attacked and retook the castle.

According to R. W. Munro, who was the Clan Munro Association's historian, Leslie's diplomatic approach did not have any difficulty in detaching the Munros and Rosses from the Mackenzies, and their involvement in the rising of 1649 was most likely from a defensive point of view because it was rumoured that Parliament was going to arrest their leaders and not because of support for Montrose. The Munros and the Rosses then fully defected to the side of the Covenanters, whom they supported at the Battle of Carbisdale in 1650 against Montrose. The Mackenzies did not support Montrose at Carbisdale but did communicate with him both before the battle and after the battle when he was in captivity.

According to Alfred John Lawrence, the Presbytery acting as the court against breaches of the Covenant Oath took up the cases of Alexander and John Bane of Knockbain, Alexander Bane of Tulloch, Captain Bane of Brahan and Alexander Bane of Tarradale, who had confessed that they had followed Lord Reay and Thomas Mackenzie of Pluscarden in support of King Charles when they helped to capture Inverness and demolish the town's walls. It was accepted that they had been coerced or misled and they were dismissed on giving oath not take up arms again against Parliament.
