= 1589 in Scotland =

- Centuries: 14th; 15th; 16th; 17th; 18th
- Decades: 1560s; 1570s; 1580s; 1590s; 1600s
- See also: List of years in Scotland; Timeline of Scottish history 1589 in: England • Elsewhere

Events from the year 1589 in the Kingdom of Scotland.

== Incumbents ==
- Monarch – James VI

== Events ==
- 20 August – Anne of Denmark marries James VI by proxy at Kronborg Castle. James's proxy George Keith, 5th Earl Marischal made speeches and gave her a jewel.
- 22 October – James VI sails from Leith in the James Royal to meet Anne of Denmark in Norway.
- 23 November – James VI and Anne of Denmark marry formally at the Old Bishop's Palace in Oslo
- Golf is played on Glasgow Green

== Births ==
- 9 December – John Fleming, 2nd Earl of Wigtown (died 1650)
- William Douglas, 1st Marquess of Douglas (died 1660)
- James King, 1st Lord Eythin, soldier (died 1652 in Sweden)
- Probable – George Jamesone, portrait painter (died 1644)

== Deaths ==
- February
  - James Halyburton, Protestant reformer (born 1518)
  - Patrick Lindsay, 6th Lord Lindsay, Confederate (born 1521)
- 7 September – Jane Kennedy, companion of Mary, Queen of Scots (drowned while making ferry crossing across the Forth to greet the new queen, Anne of Denmark)
- 28 December – George Douglas, Bishop of Moray

== See also ==
- Timeline of Scottish history
