= 1598 in Scotland =

- Centuries: 14th; 15th; 16th; 17th; 18th
- Decades: 1570s; 1580s; 1590s; 1600s; 1610s
- See also: List of years in Scotland; Timeline of Scottish history 1598 in: England • Elsewhere

Events from the year 1598 in the Kingdom of Scotland.

== Incumbents ==
- Monarch – James VI

== Events ==
- 17 January – financier Thomas Foulis is bankrupted.
- 5 August – Battle of Traigh Ghruinneart on Islay: the Clan Donald defeats the Clan Maclean, Sir Lachlan Mor Maclean being killed.
- 28 December – Issue in Edinburgh by William Schaw, Master of Work to the Crown of Scotland and General Warden of the master stonemasons, of the First Schaw Statutes, "The Statutis and ordinananceis to be obseruit by all the maister maoissounis within this realme", significant in the development of freemasonry.
- Gentleman Adventurers of Fife awarded forfeited lands on the Isle of Lewis to colonise.
- Raids on Stornoway.

== Publications ==
- James VI's The Trew Law of Free Monarchies.
- Robert Greene's play The Scottish History of James IV (posthumously).

== Births ==
- Elizabeth Bourchier, later Elizabeth Cromwell, Lady Protectress of England, Scotland and Ireland (died 1665 in England)
- John Campbell, 1st Earl of Loudoun, politician and Covenanter (died 1662)
- James Lumsden, soldier (died 1660)
- 24 December – Margaret Stuart, royal princess (died 1600)
- Approximate date – John Hepburn, soldier of fortune (killed at siege of Saverne 1636)

== Deaths ==
- 19 April – David Carnegie of Colluthie, administrator.
- August – Alexander Montgomerie, makar and outlaw (born c.1550?)
- 13 August – David Ferguson, reformer
- 3 September – John Lindsay of Balcarres, Lord Menmuir, Secretary of State (born 1552)
- David Beaton of Melgund, master of the royal household
- Mary Beaton (born 1543), companion of Mary, Queen of Scots

== See also ==
- Timeline of Scottish history
