= 1583 in Scotland =

- Centuries: 14th; 15th; 16th; 17th; 18th
- Decades: 1560s; 1570s; 1580s; 1590s; 1600s
- See also: List of years in Scotland; Timeline of Scottish history 1583 in: England • Elsewhere

Events from the year 1583 in the Kingdom of Scotland.

== Incumbents ==
- Monarch – James VI

== Events ==
- June – James VI regains his freedom following the Raid of Ruthven.
- James VI signs a charter (dated 1582) creating the Tounis College, the modern-day University of Edinburgh.

== Births ==
- Elizabeth Woodford
- Approximate date –
  - David Dickson, theologian (died 1663)
  - Alexander Henderson, theologian (died 1646)

== Deaths ==
- 26 May – Esmé Stewart, 1st Duke of Lennox (born 1542)
- 13 December – Thomas Smeton, minister and academic (born 1536)
- December – James Balfour, Lord Pittendreich, lawyer (born c. 1525)
- Alexander Arbuthnot, minister, academic and poet (born 1538)
- John Cockburn of Ormiston, Protestant laird

== See also ==
- Timeline of Scottish history
