= 1580 in Scotland =

- Centuries: 14th; 15th; 16th; 17th; 18th
- Decades: 1560s; 1570s; 1580s; 1590s; 1600s
- See also: List of years in Scotland; Timeline of Scottish history 1580 in: England • Elsewhere

Events from the year 1580 in the Kingdom of Scotland.

== Incumbents ==
- Monarch – James VI

== Births ==
- 12 January – Alexander Ruthven, master of Ruthven (killed 1600)
- 14 September – Robert Gordon of Straloch, cartographer, poet, musician, mathematician and antiquary (died 1661)
- Prince William Caudle
- Alexander Leslie, 1st Earl of Leven, soldier (died 1661)
- Approximate date – George Sinclair, mercenary (killed at Battle of Kringen 1612)

== Deaths ==
- 6 January – James Hamilton, bishop of Argyll
- c. January – William MacDowall, priest and Master of Works
- 27 October – Adam Gordon of Auchindoun, knight (born 1545)
- Robert Lindsay of Pitscottie, chronicler (born c. 1532)

== See also ==
- Timeline of Scottish history
