= 1586 in Scotland =

- Centuries: 14th; 15th; 16th; 17th; 18th
- Decades: 1560s; 1570s; 1580s; 1590s; 1600s
- See also: List of years in Scotland; Timeline of Scottish history 1586 in: England • Elsewhere

Events from the year 1586 in the Kingdom of Scotland.

== Incumbents ==
- Monarch – James VI

== Events ==
- March–July – Babington Plot, an attempt to assassinate Elizabeth I of England and replace her on the English throne by a rescued Mary, Queen of Scots, takes place. Anthony Babington and his co-conspirators are executed on 20 September.
- 6 July – Treaty of Berwick signed, making peace between James VI and Elizabeth I of England.
- Battle of Allt Camhna: the Clan Gunn and Clan Mackay defeat the Clan Sinclair.
- Battle of Leckmelm: the Clan Sutherland, Mackays of Aberach and MacLeods of Assynt defeat the Clan Gunn.
- Battle of the Western Isles on Jura: the Clan MacDonald of Sleat and Clan MacLean give battle.

== Births ==
- William Guild, minister (died 1657)
- John Wemyss, 1st Earl of Wemyss, politician (died 1649)
- Approximate date
  - Walter Balcanquhall, churchman (died 1645 in England)
  - Alexander Reid, royal physician (died 1643)

== Deaths ==
- February – George Seton, 7th Lord Seton, Lord of the Parliament of Scotland (born 1531)
- 1 August – Richard Maitland, lawyer and poet (born 1496)
- Approximate date – Robert Crichton, Lord Advocate

== See also ==
- Timeline of Scottish history
