= Thomas Mackenzie of Pluscarden =

Scottish soldier and member of parliament of the 17th century

Thomas Mackenzie of Pluscarden, also known as of Pluscardine (died c. 1676-1687) was a Scottish soldier and member of parliament of the 17th century. He was a member of the Clan Mackenzie, a Scottish clan of the Scottish Highlands.

== Early life ==
Thomas Mackenzie was the second son from the second marriage of Kenneth Mackenzie, 1st Lord Mackenzie of Kintail and his wife, Isobel, daughter of Gilbert Ogilvie of Powrie Castle. His father was the chief of the Clan Mackenzie and his elder brother was George Mackenzie, 2nd Earl of Seaforth who had succeeded their elder half-brother Colin Mackenzie, 1st Earl of Seaforth.

== Thirty Years' War ==
During the Thirty Years' War on The Continent, Thomas Mackenzie of Pluscarden served alongside Robert Monro in France in 1625. Mackenzie entered Norwegian and Danish service when Christian IV of Denmark declared war on the Holy Roman Empire. He served with Donald Mackay, 1st Lord Reay in the Netherlands in 1627.

== Scottish Civil War ==
During the Scottish Civil War of the 17th century Thomas Mackenzie of Pluscarden supported the Royalist cause. On 14 May 1639 a 4,000 strong force of Covenanters met near Elgin, Moray and who were led by the Earl of Seaforth, chief of the Mackenzies. Here, Thomas Mackenzie arranged that the Covenanters would return home and that their opponents, the Royalist Gordons should retire to the south of the River Spey. Charles I called a General Assembly of the Church of Scotland to be held at Edinburgh on August 12, 1639 and Thomas Mackenzie of Pluscarden was made the ruling elder. James Graham, 1st Marquess of Montrose soon after left the Covenanters and joined the Royalist side, and the Earl of Seaforth followed him in this, supported by Thomas Mackenzie. After Montrose's victory at the Battle of Inverlochy in 1645 the Earl of Seaforth and Thomas Mackenzie met with him and Thomas Mackenzie was asked by Parliament to explain his conduct for doing this. After Montrose's defeat in 1646, Thomas Mackenzie was fined £2,000 for having supported him by the Committee of Public Affairs.

On 5 February 1649, Charles II had been proclaimed king after his father's execution. It was decided that Charles and his allies who were in exile should again try to recover the kingdom, in connection with the plans of the exiled royalist army leader James Graham, 1st Marquess of Montrose. As a result a rising took place in the north of Scotland under Colonel Hugh Fraser, who was joined by John Munro of Lemlair, Thomas Mackenzie of Pluscarden and Sir Thomas Urquhart of Cromarty. On 22 February, they entered Inverness, where they expelled the garrison of Inverness Castle and afterwards demolished the walls and fortifications. On 26 February, a council of war was held. Here they framed certain enactments by which they took the customs and excise of the six northern counties of Scotland into their own hands. Soon afterwards General David Leslie, Lord Newark was sent north to attack them. The clans then retreated from Inverness back into Ross-shire. Leslie placed a garrison in Chanonry Castle and terms of surrender were made between him and all of the clans except for the Mackenzies. As soon as Leslie left for the south, the Mackenzies attacked and retook the castle.

In the aftermath of Montrose's final defeat at the Battle of Carbisdale in 1650, Thomas Mackenzie was permitted to speak with him on his journey South in captivity.

== Member of Parliament ==
Thomas Mackenzie was the member of parliament for Elgin from 1645 to 1663.

== Lands ==
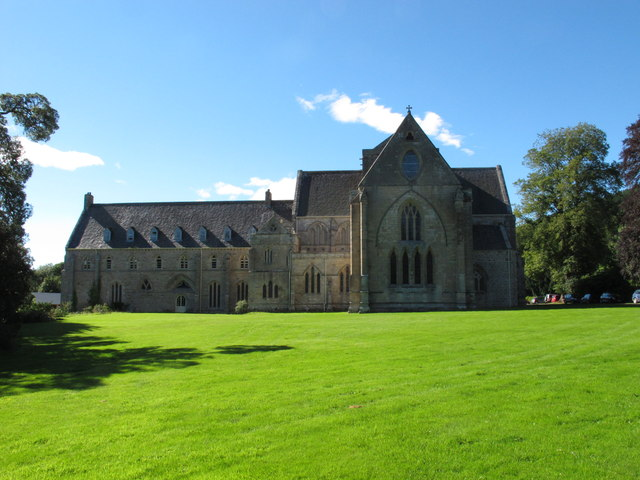
Pluscarden Abbey

Charles I had granted the Barony of Pluscarden in Elgin to Thomas Mackenzie on 25 July 1636. Thomas Mackenzie was lay-Prior of Pluscarden Abbey from 1633 to 1649.

== Family ==
Thomas Mackenzie married firstly, Jean Grant, daughter of John Grant of Freuchie (d. 1622) and widow of William Sutherland, 10th of Duffus. They had the following children:

1. Colin Mackenzie, 2nd of Pluscarden.
2. Margaret Mackenzie.
3. Alexander Mackenzie.
4. Charles Mackenzie.
5. Kenneth Mackenzie.

Thomas Mackenzie married secondly, Jean Cockburn. He died on 27 November 1676, or before May 1687.

== See also ==
- Kenneth Mackenzie of Suddie
- Hector Roy Mackenzie
