= Bain of Tulloch =

Family tree

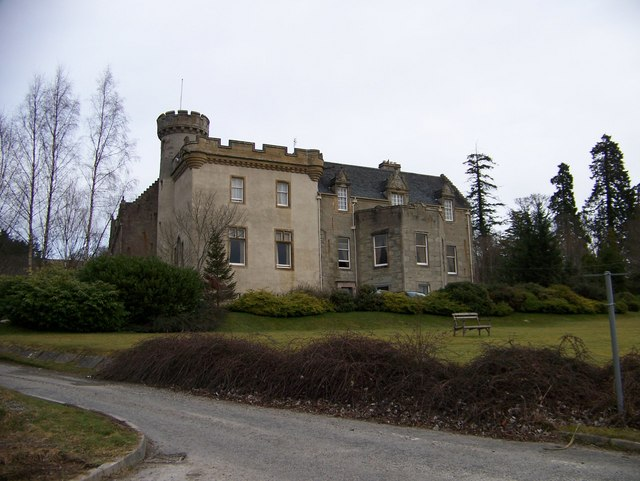
Tulloch Castle, current seat of the Bain of Tulloch family.

The Bain, Bane or Bayne family of Tulloch are a prominent aristocracy Scottish noble family.

== Origins ==
Despite their name, the Bain family were not part of the Scottish Clan MacBean (McBain). They were in fact a branch or sept of the Clan Mackay, another Highland Scottish clan. The progenitor of this family was John Bain Mackay, otherwise known as John Bàn (Bàn is Gaelic for 'fair' as in fair-haired)'. John was the son of Neil Neilson Mackay who was in turn a grandson of Donald Mackay (died 1370), chief of Clan Mackay. John Bain Mackay dropped his surname and used his middle name of Bain as a surname instead. This may have been due to a feud within the Clan Mackay involving his father Neil Neilson Mackay that had resulted in the Battle of Drumnacoub in 1427 through 1433. Due to this conflict John Bain not only dropped the surname of Mackay but moved from his homeland in the west of the county of Sutherland to the neighboring county of Caithness.

== Early ancestry ==
John Bain married in 1436 and died in 1452, leaving four sons:

1. John Bain, born 1437, progenitor of the Bain families of Caithness and Haddingstonshire (East Lothian).
2. William Bain, born 1438, progenitor of the Bain families of Clyth.
3. Alexander Bain, born 1440, progenitor of the Baynes of Tulloch and Dingwall. This family were seated at Tulloch Castle.
4. Donald Bain, born 1443, settled in Galloway.

== Bains of Tulloch ==
Alexander Bane or Bain married in about 1455 to a sister of Farquhar Oure. He moved his family to Dingwall in about 1482 and he died in about 1503, leaving the following children, who were probably born at Olrig:

1. Donald (b. c. 1461).
2. Alexander (b. c. 1462).
3. John (b. c. 1463).
4. David (b. c. 1465).

Alexander (b. c. 1462) having been taken to Dingwall by his father in about 1482 became a business man there. He took an active interest in the affairs of the burgh and was a burgess there. He died in 1518 leaving the following children:

1. Duncan, 1st Laird of Tulloch (b. c. 1489).
2. John (b. c. 1490).
3. William (b. c. 1500), who went to Papigoe, married there and left a son, William, who received a charter for the whole field of Stemster.
4. Alexander (b. c. 1503).

=== Duncan Bane, 1st Laird of Tulloch ===
Duncan Bane became the 1st Laird of Tulloch. He married in 1512 to a daughter of Hector Roy Mackenzie who was the chieftain of the Mackenzie of Gairloch family. In 1542, Duncan Bane was granted more lands in Tulloch and elsewhere by James V of Scotland and which had previously belonged to his great-uncle, Farquhar Oure, whose son and heir had died. This included Tulloch Castle. He also obtained from the Munros the lands of Dochcarty in 1553. He died in 1559, leaving the following children:

1. Alexander, 2nd Laird of Tulloch (b. c. 1515).
2. John.
3. William.
4. Ronald, who was a natural son, b. c. 1518.
5. Two daughters.

=== Alexander Bane, 2nd Laird of Tulloch ===
Alexander Bane, 2nd Laird of Tulloch married firstly, in 1558, to Janet Dingwall of the Dingwall of Kildun family, by whom he had his son and heir, Duncan. He married secondly in 1562 to Agnes, daughter of James Fraser and niece of Hugh Fraser, 5th Lord Lovat, with whom he had eight more children. In 1562, he exchanged lands in Sutherland with Robert Mor Munro, 15th Baron of Foulis for lands in Ross-shire. He was also infeft with Foulis's lands in Dingwall.

A record of the Privy Council of Scotland dated 25 December 1595, records a complaint made by Alexander Bane of Tulloch and Alexander Bane, Fiar of Logie against John Macknezie, Minister of Urray. They accused Mackenzie of harbouring John Macgillicum Rasa, a common thief and denounced rebel, who had murdered two sons of Alexander Bane of Logie. Secondly, of coming to the complainant's lands in Urray and cutting "his lewis and rigwiddies" and laying waste to the lands. Mackenzie failed to appear, was denounced a rebel and was put to the horn.

Alexander Bane's eldest son from his second marriage was Alexander Bane "The Younger of Tulloch". He was famous as "Alastair Mor Ban" because of his strength, fierceness and savage acts which concerned his father. When one of the Mackenzies claimed the Bane lands in Torridon, Alexander Bane the younger led a band of men to a public fair at Logie where they killed the Mackenzie and which resulted in the Battle of Logiebride, in 1597, where many of the Banes and their friends the Munros were apparently killed by the Mackenzies. Alastair Mor Bane escaped and made his way to his uncle, Lord Lovat, who sent a message to the King at Falkland Palace, but the Mackenzies got there first and burnt the Bane's lands.

Alexander Bane, 2nd Laird of Tulloch's son with his first wife Janet Dingwall:

1. Duncan Bane, 3rd Laird of Tulloch.

Alexander Bane, 2nd Laird of Tulloch's eight children with Agnes, daughter of James Fraser and niece of Hugh Fraser, 5th Lord Lovat:

1. Alexander Bane, progenitor of the Banes of Wester Logie.
2. Ronald, Janet, John, Marjory, Giles, Hugh or Ewen, Catherine.

=== Duncan Bane, 3rd Laird of Tulloch ===
Duncan Bane, 3rd Laird of Tulloch was born in about 1559 and succeeded his father in 1599. He married firstly, Elspet, daughter of Torquil Connach MacLeod, chief of the Clan MacLeod of Lewis. He married secondly, Isabel, daughter of Alexander Mackenzie, II of Fairburn. In 1611, during a feud between the Mackenzies of Gairloch and the MacLeods of Lewis, John Roy Mackenzie, 4th of Gairloch sent his son, Murdoch Mackenzie, along with Alexander Bane, son of Duncan Bane, 3rd Laird of Tulloch, to search for and seize the MacLeod of Lewis chief. However, they landed on Raasay and were both killed, along with most of their men, in a skirmish with the Clan MacLeod of Raasay. The chief of the MacLeods of Raasay was also killed along with most of his men.

In the aftermath of the Battle of Glen Fruin in 1603 which was between the Clan Colquhoun and the Clan Gregor, the King made it illegal to aid or communicate with the MacGregors. As a result of this, among those fined were William Bane, dyer in Dingwall, one pound, Alastair Bane of Loggie, 1000 merks and John MacEane vic Bane, in Caldwell, 100 merks.

Duncan Bane, 3rd Laird of Tulloch died in about 1623. His children by his first marriage were:

1. Alexander (b. c. 1590 and killed in 1611 as above).
2. John, 4th Laird of Tulloch (b. c. 1591).
3. Ronald (b. c. 1597), progenitor of the Banes of Knockbain and of Donald Bain of Dingwall and Wick.
4. Kenneth, Lauchlan, Duncan, Roderick, David, Donald, Anne, Janet, Elizabeth, and Agnes.

From Duncan Bane, 3rd Laird of Tulloch's second marriage:

1. Alexander Bane, 1st of Tarradale.

=== John Bane, 4th Laird of Tulloch ===
John Bane, 4th Laird of Tulloch succeeded his father in about 1626. He married Elizabeth, daughter of Roderick Mackenzie, I of Redcastle in about 1616. He was prominent in the municipal affairs of Dingwall and was provost of Dingwall three times. In 1644, his lands in the parish of Dingwall had an annual rental value of £906 6s 8d., Scots.

The Presbytery acting as the court against breaches of the Covenant Oath took up the cases of Alexander and John Bane of Knockbain, Alexander Bane of Tulloch, Captain Bane of Brahan and Alexander Bane of Tarradale who had confessed that they had followed Lord Reay and Mackenzie in support of Charles II of England when they helped to capture Inverness and demolish the town's walls. It was accepted that they had been coerced or misled and they were dismissed on giving oath not take up arms again against Parliament.

John Bane, 4th Laird of Tulloch died in 1669 and was succeeded by his grandson, Donald. John had the following children:

1. Duncan (b. c. 1618), married Catherine, daughter of Alexander Mackenzie of Kilkoy in about 1637 and predeceased his father in 1649, leaving issue: Donald, 5th Laird of Tulloch, John, and Henry.
2. Roderick, (b. c. 1620), who became Tutor of Tulloch.
3. Ronald (b. c. 1625).
4. John (b. c. 1626).
5. Elizabeth.
6. Margaret.

=== Sir Donald Bane (Bayne), 5th Laird of Tulloch ===
Donald Bane, 5th Laird of Tulloch succeeded his grandfather in 1670. He was prominent in Scottish national affairs. He was knighted in 1680 and soon afterwards started spelling his surname as Bayne. He was a member of the Scottish Parliament in 1681 and 1685. In 1685 he gave funds to three bursars each at the University of St Andrews and the University of Edinburgh. He was Provost of Dingwall in 1709. He was the only Bayne Laird of Tulloch to be knighted. Most of his children predeceased him. His children were:

1. John (b. 1673), who became a member of the Royal Company of Archers and was later made a Brigadier.
2. Duncan (b. 1674).
3. Alexander (b. 1676).
4. Kenneth, 6th Laird of Tulloch (b. 1677).
5. Annabella (b. 1678).
6. Rorie (b. 1679).
7. Ronald (b. 1680).
8. Katherine (b. 1681).
9. Elizabeth (b. 1683).
10. Donald (b. 1684).
11. James (b. 1685).
12. Alexander (b. 1686).
13. William (b. 1688).
14. Janet (b. 1692).

=== Kenneth Bayne, 6th Laird of Tulloch ===
Kenneth Bayne, 6th Laird of Tulloch was burgess of Dingwall in 1709. He succeeded his father as the eldest surviving son in 1716. He married in 1718 to Isabel, daughter of Sir Kenneth Mackenzie of Scatwell and died in May, 1719, without legitimate issue. Kenneth's cousin John therefore received possession of the estate.

=== John Bayne, 7th Laird of Tulloch ===
John Bayne, eldest son of the above mentioned Roderick, Tutor of Tulloch, and grandson of the 4th Laird, became the 7th Laird. However, John Bayne sold the estate in 1719 to his younger step-brother, Kenneth Bayne, who was born from the second marriage of Roderick the Tutor of Tulloch. John the 7th Laird died without legitimate issue in 1731.

=== Kenneth Bayne, 8th Laird of Tulloch ===
Kenneth Bayne, 8th Laird of Tulloch having purchased the estate of Tulloch became the 8th Laird in about 1720. He added a large extension to the west side of Tulloch Castle in about 1747. He had married Anna Bayne, daughter of Ronald Bayne, 3rd of Knockbain in about 1700. He died in about 1747 and was succeeded by his eldest son. His children were:

1. Kenneth, 9th Laird of Tulloch (b. 1719).
2. William (b. 1720).

=== Kenneth Bayne, 9th Laird of Tulloch ===
Kenneth Bayne, 9th Laird of Tulloch was the last of the family to reign at Tulloch Castle. The estate had been burdened with debts because of the extravagance of his father which he was unsuccessful in trying to undo. The Barony was sold in 1762 to Henry Davidson, son of William Davidson who had married Jean Bayne. This Jean Bayne is thought to have been the granddaughter of John Bayne who in turn was the son of Ronald Bayne, 1st of Knockbain from his second marriage. The title of Laird now sits after the death of Alexander Bain, with his grandson, Alexander Bain (35)

== Bibliography ==
- Lawrence, Alfred John (1963). The Clan Bain With Its Ancestral And Related Scottish Clans. Inverness: Highland Printers Limited.
