= 1592 in Scotland =

- Centuries: 14th; 15th; 16th; 17th; 18th
- Decades: 1570s; 1580s; 1590s; 1600s; 1610s
- See also: List of years in Scotland; Timeline of Scottish history 1592 in: England • Elsewhere

Events from the year 1592 in the Kingdom of Scotland.

== Incumbents ==
- Monarch – James VI

== Events ==
- 7 February – George Gordon, 1st Marquess of Huntly, sets fire to Donibristle Castle and murders James Stewart, 2nd Earl of Moray.
- 5 June – Parliament of Scotland meets.
- June – James VI enacts the "Golden Act" recognising the power of Presbyterianism within the Scottish church.
- June – The Mines and Metals Act grants Scottish landowners freedom to mine, subject to a levy to the Crown. Lord Menmuir was made Master of Metals in June.
- 28 June – the outlawed Francis Stewart, 5th Earl of Bothwell, attempts to capture Falkland Palace and the king, accompanied by Walter Scott of Harden and James Scott of Balwearie, with the English border reivers Richie Graham of Brackenhill and Thomas Musgrave of Bewcastle, and others.
- August – Margaret Vinstarr helps her lover John Wemyss of Logie escape from Dalkeith Palace.
- December – Spanish blanks plot discovered.

== Births ==
- Robert Burnet, Lord Crimond, advocate and judge (died 1661)
- George Gordon, 2nd Marquess of Huntly (died 1649)

== Deaths ==
- 7 February – James Stewart, 2nd Earl of Moray (born c.1565)
- Patrick Adamson, Archbishop of St Andrews (born 1537)
- Alexander Erskine of Gogar, laird
- William Livingstone, 6th Lord Livingston

== Buildings ==
- Burntisland Parish Church

== See also ==
- Timeline of Scottish history
