= 1582 in Scotland =

- Centuries: 14th; 15th; 16th; 17th; 18th
- Decades: 1560s; 1570s; 1580s; 1590s; 1600s
- See also: List of years in Scotland; Timeline of Scottish history 1582 in: England • Elsewhere

Events from the year 1582 in the Kingdom of Scotland.

== Incumbents ==
- Monarch – James VI

== Events ==
- 22 August – Raid of Ruthven: a political conspiracy of Presbyterian nobles abduct the King.
- George Buchanan's History of Scotland (Rerum Scoticarum Historia) is first published, in Edinburgh.
- Donald Monro's Description of the Western Isles of Scotland (1549) is first published.

== Births ==
- 28 January – John Barclay, writer, satirist and poet (died 1621 in Rome)
- 7 August – William Douglas, 7th Earl of Morton, Lord High Treasurer of Scotland (died 1648)
- William Lithgow, traveller, writer and alleged spy (died 1645)

== Deaths ==
- 3 July – James Crichton, polymath (born 1560) (fatally stabbed in Mantua)
- 28 September – George Buchanan, Scottish historian (born 1506)
- Mary Livingston, noble and courtier (born c. 1541)

== See also ==
- Timeline of Scottish history
