= 1594 in Scotland =

- Centuries: 14th; 15th; 16th; 17th; 18th
- Decades: 1570s; 1580s; 1590s; 1600s; 1610s
- See also: List of years in Scotland; Timeline of Scottish history 1594 in: England • Elsewhere

Events from the year 1594 in the Kingdom of Scotland.

== Incumbents ==
- Monarch – James VI

== Events ==
- Declinature Act
- Ejection Caution Act
- Land Purchase Act
- Parricide Act
- 30 August - Baptism of Prince Henry at Stirling Castle.
- 3 October – Battle of Glenlivet: Catholic clansmen of George Gordon, 1st Marquess of Huntly and Francis Hay, 9th Earl of Erroll, are victorious over the Protestant forces of Archibald Campbell, 7th Earl of Argyll

== Births ==
- 19 February – Henry Frederick, Prince of Wales (died 1612 in England)
- Lady Anne Campbell
- Robert Douglas, minister (died 1674)
- William Mure, writer and politician (died 1657)

== Deaths ==
- John Seton, Lord Barns, diplomat, courtier and judge
- Alexander Hay (died 1594), lawyer and administrator

== See also ==
- Timeline of Scottish history
