= Munro of Kiltearn =

Minor noble Scottish family

The Munros of Kiltearn were a minor noble Scottish family and a branch of the ancient Clan Munro, a Scottish clan of the Scottish Highlands.They were seated at Kiltearn House which was a manor house that shared the same name of the parish it was situated in, Kiltearn. In Scottish Gaelic the Munros of Kiltearn are known as the Sliochd-Alastair-Mhic-Uistean. The most famous member of the Munro of Kiltearn family was Donald Monro, High Dean of the Isles.

== Alexander Munro, I of Kiltearn ==
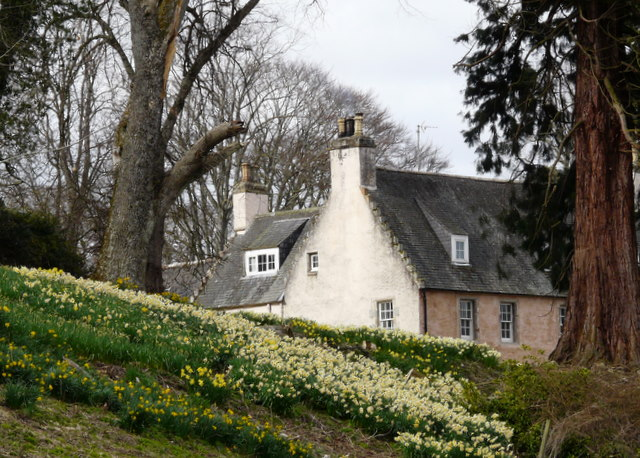
Ardullie Lodge

Alexander Munro, 1st of Kiltearn was the fourth son of Hugh Munro, 1st of Coul who in turn was the second son of George Munro, 10th Baron of Foulis, chief of the Clan Munro. It is from Alexander that the Munros of Kiltearn take their Gaelic name, Sliochd-Alastair-Mhic-Uistean, which translates as descendants of Alexander, son of Hugh. Alexander married Janet, daughter of Farquhar Mclean, III of Dochgarroch, and their children were:

1. Donald Monro, High Dean of the Isles who is first heard of professionally as Archdeacon of the Isles in 1549. He made his famous tour of the Isles (Inner Hebrides and Outer Hebrides) in 1549 and subsequently wrote his famous Description of the Western Isles of Scotland which was later printed from his original manuscript in Edinburgh in 1744, although only 50 copies of this edition were made. However, the work was re-printed in 1805, 1818 and 1884.
2. Hugh Munro, 1st of Ferrytown of Obsdale.
3. Alexander Munro, 1st of Ardullie.
4. John Munro, 2nd of Kiltearn, who succeeded his father in the Kiltearn estates.
5. Farquhar Munro, 1st of Teanoird.
6. William Munro of Nether-Culcraggie, whose two younger sons were killed at the Battle of Logiebride in 1597 fighting against the Clan Mackenzie.

== John Munro, II of Kiltearn ==
John Munro, 2nd of Kiltearn was granted the lands of Kiltearn "in feu and for service" by the clan chief Robert Mor Munro, 15th Baron of Foulis. John married Christian, daughter of Thomas Urquhart of Ferrytown, parish of Resolis and had the following children:

1. Hector Munro, 3rd of Kiltearn, heir and successor to the Kiltearn estate.
2. Alexander Munro, of whom nothing is known.

John Munro, 2nd of Kiltearn died towards the close of the sixteenth century.

== Hector Munro, III of Kiltearn ==
Hector Munro, 3rd of Kiltearn married Margaret, daughter of John Sutherland of Balblair and had the following children:

1. William Munro, 4th of Kiltearn, heir and successor to the Kiltearn estates.
2. Robert Munro, who accompanied Colonel John Munro of Obsdale to the Thirty Years' War in Germany and died at Wittemberg in 1631. He left a son, Major Donald or Daniel Munro, who accompanied General Robert Monro to Ireland where he settled. Daniel's son Colonel Henry Monro of Drumnascamph, Co Down, later of Roe's Hall or Rosehall there was the progenitor of the Monroes of Lower Iveagh. His many prominent descendants included John Monroe, Solicitor General of Ireland 1885-93, and also Henry Munro of the United Irishmen who was hanged for his part in the Irish Rebellion of 1798.
3. Janet Munro, who married George, third son of Hector Munro, 1st of Fyrish.

Hector Munro, 3rd of Kiltearn died in about 1620.

== William Munro, IV of Kiltearn ==
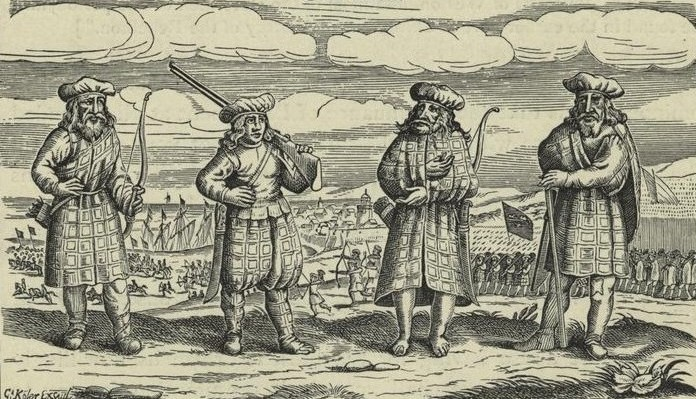
17th century print assumed to show men of Mac-Keys (Mackay's) regiment during the Thirty Years' War in Germany

William Munro, 4th of Kiltearn married Margaret, daughter of Hector Munro, 2nd of Culcraggie and had the following children:

1. John Munro, 5th of Kiltearn, heir and successor to the Kiltearn estates.
2. Hector Munro who accompanied his uncle Robert to the wars in Germany. Colonel Robert Monro said in his work Monro, His Expedition With the Worthy Scots Regiment Called Mac-Keys that Hector was a "stout and valorous gentleman" and that he died of a "languish-ague in Vertenberg, being much lamented by his comrades and friends".

William Munro, 4th of Kiltearn died in about 1666.

== John Munro, V of Kiltearn ==
John Munro, 5th of Kiltearn also went to the wars in Germany and Colonel Robert Monro said of him that "yet more spark, being resolute, fix soldier with musket as ever I commanded, died here (Grissenberg) of the pest, called Andrew Munro, being but eighteen years of age; though little of stature, no toil nor travel could overset him; and as he was stout so he was merry and sociable without offence; such another was his cousin, John Munro, Kiltearn's grand child, who died of a burning fever, being alive without fear before his enemy, and of a merry quick disposition. I made only mention of their names because they lived virtuously and died with far more credit than if they had died at home, where their names had never been recorded for their worth and virtues". John Munro, 5th of Kiltearn married Isobel, daughter of Alexander Simpson of St Martins, and had one son:

1. Hector Munro, 6th of Kiltearn.

== Hector Munro, 6th of Kiltearn ==
Hector Munro, 6th of Kiltearn married firstly Margaret, daughter of Dr David Munro and they had several children, but all of them died in infancy. He married secondly, Florence, fourth daughter of Colonel John Munro, 2nd of Lemlair, but they had no children. Florence was alive in 1688 and apparently lived to a very old age. According to historian Alexander Mackenzie although the family succeeded to the Kiltearn estates, the Munros of Kiltearn apparently died out in the male line.

== Alexander Munro of Kiltearn ==
In the 18th century the Kiltearn estate passed to another branch of the Munro family, Alexander Munro of Kiltearn who was descended from one of the illegitimate sons of Hector Munro, 13th Baron of Foulis of the 16th century. This Alexander Munro of Kiltearn appears as one of the signatories in the court case of Roderick McCulloch who was a Jacobite prisoner in London indicted for high treason. Alexander Munro "of" Kiltearn is found recorded as the father of several children in the Kiltearn parish registers in this period, such as that for Jacobina Munro dated 23 May 1753. Alexander Munro of Kiltearn later sold the estate to the clan chief Sir Harry Munro, 7th Baronet.
