= 1587 in Scotland =

- Centuries: 14th; 15th; 16th; 17th; 18th
- Decades: 1560s; 1570s; 1580s; 1590s; 1600s
- See also: List of years in Scotland; Timeline of Scottish history 1587 in: England • Elsewhere

Events from the year 1587 in the Kingdom of Scotland.

== Incumbents ==
- Monarch – James VI

== Events ==
- 8 February – the captive Mary, Queen of Scots, is beheaded at Fotheringhay Castle in England on the orders of her cousin Elizabeth I of England for being implicated in the Babington Plot against her.

== Births ==
- Approximate date – Thomas Young, Presbyterian minister (died 1655 in England)

== Deaths ==
- 8 February – Mary, Queen of Scots (born 1542)
- John Black, composer (born c.1520)

== See also ==
- Timeline of Scottish history
