= 1593 in Scotland =

- Centuries: 14th; 15th; 16th; 17th; 18th
- Decades: 1570s; 1580s; 1590s; 1600s; 1610s
- See also: List of years in Scotland; Timeline of Scottish history 1593 in: England • Elsewhere

Events from the year 1593 in the Kingdom of Scotland.

== Incumbents ==
- Monarch – James VI

== Events ==
- 24 July – Raid of Holyrood, the rebel Francis Stewart, 5th Earl of Bothwell infiltrates Holyrood Palace.
- 12 November – decree orders Catholics to give up their faith or leave the country.
- 7 December – Battle of Dryfe Sands: the Clan Johnstone defeat the Clan Maxwell at Skipmyre, just west of Lockerbie, and Lord Maxwell is killed.
- Marischal College is founded in Aberdeen by George Keith, 5th Earl Marischal.
- Emergence of the Presbytery of Glasgow within the developing Presbyterian polity.
- The Banffshire constituency is first represented in the Parliament of Scotland (by Sir Walter Ogilvie).

== Births ==
- 13 April – Thomas Wentworth, 1st Earl of Strafford, English politician (executed 1641)
- 2 May – John Forbes of Corse, theologian (died 1648)
- Robert Blair, moderator (died 1666)

== Deaths ==
- 16 January – Laurence Oliphant, 4th Lord Oliphant (born 1529)
- 4 February – Robert Stewart, 1st Earl of Orkney (born 1533/4)
- 26 May – William Baillie, Lord Provand, judge
- 23 August – Adam Bothwell, bishop, judge and politician (born c.1527)
- 26 September – William Chisholm, bishop of Dunblane (born 1525/6)
- 7 December – John Maxwell, 8th Lord Maxwell (born 1553)
- date unknown –
  - William Ashby, English politician
  - William Forbes of Corsindae

== See also ==
- Timeline of Scottish history
