= 1578 in Scotland =

- Centuries: 14th; 15th; 16th; 17th; 18th
- Decades: 1550s; 1560s; 1570s; 1580s; 1590s
- See also: List of years in Scotland; Timeline of Scottish history 1578 in: England • Elsewhere

Events from the year 1578 in the Kingdom of Scotland.

== Incumbents ==
- Monarch – James VI
- Regent Morton

== Events ==
- Battle of the Spoiling Dyke at Trumpan on the Isle of Skye: the Clan MacLeod are victorious over the MacDonalds of Uist in a feud.

== Births ==
- Robert Boyd, Principal of the University of Glasgow (died 1627)
- William Welwod, jurist (died 1622)
- Gilbert Jack, philosopher (died 1628)

== Deaths ==
- February – Archibald Ruthven.
- 7 March – Margaret Douglas, Countess of Lennox
- 17 March – John Lyon, 8th Lord Glamis.
- 14 April – James Hepburn, 4th Earl of Bothwell, third husband of Mary, Queen of Scots, in Denmark (born c. 1534)
- May/September – Robert Richardson, lord treasurer
- September/October – Alexander Hepburn, Bishop of Ross
- James Douglas, 7th of Drumlanrig, baron

== See also ==
- Timeline of Scottish history
