= 1579 in Scotland =

- Centuries: 14th; 15th; 16th; 17th; 18th
- Decades: 1550s; 1560s; 1570s; 1580s; 1590s
- See also: List of years in Scotland; Timeline of Scottish history 1579 in: England • Elsewhere

Events from the year 1579 in the Kingdom of Scotland.

== Incumbents ==
- Monarch – James VI

== Events ==
- September
  - 11-year old James VI declares the end of his minority and assumes personal rule.
  - Esmé Stewart, Sieur d'Aubigny, James's cousin, arrives from France and becomes the king's first favourite.
- 19 October – Entry of James VI into Edinburgh, ceremonially marking the start of his personal rule.
- First of the Scottish Poor Laws passed.
- Members of the Glasgow Trades House defend Glasgow Cathedral from depredation.

== Births ==
- 23 August – Thomas Dempster, Catholic scholar and historian (died 1625)
- Jean Kincaid, mariticide (executed 1600)
- John Ogilvie, Jesuit martyr (executed 1615)
- Approximate date –
  - John Cameron, Calvinist theologian (died 1625)
  - Arthur Johnston, poet and physician (died 1641)
  - Tobias Hume, composer (died 1645 in England)

== Deaths ==
- 25 April – John Stewart, 4th Earl of Atholl, noble
- 16 October – Sir James MacGill, courtier
- Possible date –
  - David Peebles, religious composer (born c. 1510)
  - James Sandilands, 1st Lord Torphichen, noble (born c. 1511)

== See also ==
- Timeline of Scottish history
