= 1585 in Scotland =

- Centuries: 14th; 15th; 16th; 17th; 18th
- Decades: 1560s; 1570s; 1580s; 1590s; 1600s
- See also: List of years in Scotland; Timeline of Scottish history 1585 in: England • Elsewhere

Events from the year 1585 in the Kingdom of Scotland.

== Incumbents ==
- Monarch – James VI

== Events ==
- Curators Act 1585 passed
- 30 April – First death in Edinburgh from plague.
- 4 November – James VI surrenders Stirling Castle to the rebel lords.

== Births ==
- 13 December – William Drummond of Hawthornden, poet (died 1649)
- date unknown –
  - William Forbes, first Bishop of Edinburgh (died 1634)
  - Sir John Scott of Scotstarvet, noble, known as a lawyer, statesman and author (died 1670)
  - James Wedderburn, Bishop of Dunblane (died 1639)

== Deaths ==
- February – George Seton, 7th Lord Seton (born 1531)
- March – Robert Crichton, Bishop of Dunkeld
- 3 June – John Grant of Freuchie.
- 1 September – Alexander Arbuthnot, printer
- 8 October – Andrew Hay, 8th Earl of Erroll
- 4 December – John Willock, reformer (born c. 1515)

== See also ==
- Timeline of Scottish history
