= 1600 in Scotland =

- Centuries: 14th; 15th; 16th; 17th; 18th
- Decades: 1580s; 1590s; 1600s; 1610s; 1620s
- See also: List of years in Scotland; Timeline of Scottish history 1600 in: England • Elsewhere

Events from the year 1600 in the Kingdom of Scotland

== Incumbents ==
- Monarch – James VI

== Events ==
- 1 January – today is adopted as New Year's Day following the partial adoption of the Gregorian Calendar in Scotland
- 20 March – Construction of Cullen House in Moray begins.
- 5 August – the Gowrie House affair, a plot to kidnap James VI in Perth, in which Robert Logan of Restalrig is implicated, devised by John Ruthven, 3rd Earl of Gowrie (who dies in the attempt, together with his brother Alexander Ruthven)
- 19 November – the future King Charles I of England and Scotland, son of James VI, is born in Dunfermline Palace
- Scalloway Castle is built on Mainland, Shetland, by Patrick Stewart, 2nd Earl of Orkney

== Births ==
- 19 November – Charles I at Dunfermline Palace, king of England and Scotland (executed 1649 in England)
- November – John Ogilby, cartographer (died 1676 in England)
- Approximate date
  - David Leslie, Lord Newark, soldier (died 1682)
  - Samuel Rutherford, theologian (died 1661)

== Deaths ==
- March – Margaret Stuart, royal princess (born 1598)
- 5 August – Gowrie House affair
  - John Ruthven, 3rd Earl of Gowrie, nobleman and kidnapper (born c.1577)
  - Alexander Ruthven, master of Ruthven (born 1580)
- 12 December – John Craig, minister (born c.1512)

== See also ==
- Timeline of Scottish history
- 1600 in England
- 1600 in Ireland
