= 1581 in Scotland =

- Centuries: 14th; 15th; 16th; 17th; 18th
- Decades: 1560s; 1570s; 1580s; 1590s; 1600s
- See also: List of years in Scotland; Timeline of Scottish history 1581 in: England • Elsewhere

Events from the year 1581 in the Kingdom of Scotland.

== Incumbents ==
- Monarch – James VI

== Events ==
- January – James Stewart marries Elizabeth Stuart, 2nd Countess of Moray, celebrated with masques and running at the ring. James VI takes part.

== Births ==
- Thomas Sydserf, a merchant
- James Stuart, 3rd Earl of Moray

== Deaths ==
- 2 June – James Douglas, 4th Earl of Morton executed.

== See also ==
- Timeline of Scottish history
