= 1588 in Scotland =

- Centuries: 14th; 15th; 16th; 17th; 18th
- Decades: 1560s; 1570s; 1580s; 1590s; 1600s
- See also: List of years in Scotland; Timeline of Scottish history 1588 in: England • Elsewhere

Events from the year 1588 in the Kingdom of Scotland.

== Incumbents ==
- Monarch – James VI

== Events ==
- 6 February – General Assembly of the Church of Scotland called to defend against the Spanish Armada.
- 12 August – the fleeing Spanish Armada sails past the Firth of Forth, and the English call off their pursuit. Much of the Spanish fleet is destroyed by storms as it sails for home around Scotland and Ireland. On 27 September, El Gran Grifón is wrecked on Fair Isle; and on 5 November the San Juan de Silicia is said to have been destroyed by explosion having sought shelter off Tobermory, Mull.
- date unknown – Hamilton Academy founded as a grammar school in Lanarkshire (closed 1972).

== Births ==
- 15 May – John Moore, planter in Ulster (died 1648 in Ireland)
- David Forrester, divine (died 1633)

== Deaths ==
- Between 1 April & 5 November – George Gordon, bishop of Galloway
- 16 July – Agnes Keith, Countess of Moray (born c.1540)
- 4 August – Archibald Douglas, 8th Earl of Angus (born 1555)
- 4 November – Robert Mor Munro, 15th Baron of Foulis

== See also ==
- Timeline of Scottish history
