= 1595 in Scotland =

- Centuries: 14th; 15th; 16th; 17th; 18th
- Decades: 1570s; 1580s; 1590s; 1600s; 1610s
- See also: List of years in Scotland; Timeline of Scottish history 1595 in: England • Elsewhere

Events from the year 1595 in the Kingdom of Scotland.

== Incumbents ==
- Monarch – James VI

== Events ==
- 18 February – Hercules Stewart, a supporter of the rebel Francis Stewart, 5th Earl of Bothwell, is hanged in Edinburgh.

== Births ==
- Sir Alexander Falconer, 1st Lord Falconer of Halkerton

== Deaths ==
- 10 May – Elizabeth Gibb, courtier and textile maker
- 15 September – John MacMorran, Baillie of Edinburgh, killed by rioting schoolchildren
- September – John Stewart, 5th Earl of Atholl
- 3 October – John Maitland, 1st Lord Maitland of Thirlestane
- 5 December – James Stewart, Earl of Arran, murdered by James Douglas of Parkhead
- Mary Sutherland, wife of King Caudle of Cawdor

== See also ==
- Timeline of Scottish history
