= List of listed buildings in Knockbain, Highland =

This is a list of listed buildings in the parish of Knockbain in Highland, Scotland.

== List ==
Name	Location	Date listed	Geo-coordinates	Notes	Category	LB number	Image
Old Ferry Pier (East Pier)	North Kessock		57°30′02″N 4°14′41″W		C(S)	13464	Upload another image
Allangrange House, Lodge, Gate Piers And Gates			57°32′03″N 4°17′44″W		B	8011	Upload Photo
Kilmuir Old Church Burial Ground			57°31′19″N 4°12′39″W		B	7990	Upload another image See more images
By Munlochy, Knockbain House, Former Manse			57°32′21″N 4°15′52″W		B	8023	Upload Photo
St John's Episcopal Church	Arpafeelie		57°31′24″N 4°19′20″W		B	7987	Upload another image See more images
Bogallan Free Church			57°31′26″N 4°16′51″W		C(S)	7989	Upload another image See more images
Kilmuir, Chisholm Cottage And The Neuk			57°31′05″N 4°12′58″W		C(S)	7991	Upload Photo
Old Allangrange			57°31′54″N 4°17′57″W		A	8013	Upload another image See more images
North Kessock, Croft Downie			57°30′35″N 4°13′37″W		B	8014	Upload Photo
Episcopal Parsonage	Arpafeelie		57°31′25″N 4°19′20″W		C(S)	7988	Upload Photo
Roskill (Previously Wester Suddie)			57°33′40″N 4°14′27″W		B	7993	Upload Photo
Suddie Old Church Burial Ground, excluding Scheduled Monument No 5571 'St Duthac's Church'			57°33′47″N 4°13′59″W		B	7994	Upload another image See more images
Allangrange House, Stables			57°32′19″N 4°17′29″W		C(S)	8010	Upload Photo
Allangrange Ruined Chapel And Private Burial Of Fraser Mackenzies Of Allangrange			57°31′58″N 4°17′52″W		B	8012	Upload Photo
By Kilmuir, Drynie Mains			57°31′30″N 4°14′15″W		B	7992	Upload Photo
Bellfield Farmhouse, Including Stone Well	North Kessock		57°30′28″N 4°16′15″W		C(S)	50185	Upload another image
Allangrange House			57°32′16″N 4°17′34″W		B	8009	Upload Photo
North Kessock Hotel (Eilean Dubh Inn)	North Kessock		57°30′06″N 4°14′52″W		C(S)	8024	Upload another image See more images

== Key ==
The scheme for classifying buildings in Scotland is:

- Category A: "buildings of national or international importance, either architectural or historic; or fine, little-altered examples of some particular period, style or building type."
- Category B: "buildings of regional or more than local importance; or major examples of some particular period, style or building type, which may have been altered."
- Category C: "buildings of local importance; lesser examples of any period, style, or building type, as originally constructed or moderately altered; and simple traditional buildings which group well with other listed buildings."

In March 2016 there were 47,288 listed buildings in Scotland. Of these, 8% were Category A, and 50% were Category B, with the remaining 42% being Category C.

== See also ==
- List of listed buildings in Highland
