= 1591 in Scotland =

- Centuries: 14th; 15th; 16th; 17th; 18th
- Decades: 1570s; 1580s; 1590s; 1600s; 1610s
- See also: List of years in Scotland; Timeline of Scottish history 1591 in: England • Elsewhere

The following events occurred in the Kingdom of Scotland in the year 1591.

== Incumbents ==
- Monarch – James VI

== Events ==
- February – Brian O'Rourke, rebel lord of West Bréifne in Ireland, seeks right of asylum in Scotland
- 3 April – Brian O'Rourke is arrested in Glasgow and delivered to the English
- 21 June - Wedding of Lilias Murray and John Grant of Freuchie at Tullibardine Castle.
- 27 December – Raid of Holyrood: The rebel Francis Stewart, 5th Earl of Bothwell breaks into Holyroodhouse.
- December – Newes from Scotland – declaring the damnable life and death of Dr. John Fian, likely compiled by James Carmichael, is published in London
- Burgh of Cockenzie created by James VI
- Canongate Tolbooth built in Edinburgh

== Births ==
- March – Donald Mackay, 1st Lord Reay, soldier (died 1649)
- Adam Steuart, philosopher (died 1645 in Leiden)

== Deaths ==
- 28 January – Agnes Sampson, executed as a witch
- 16 December – Dr. John Fian, executed as a sorcerer
- John Erskine of Dun, religious reformer (born 1509)
- Andrew Stewart, 2nd Lord Ochiltree (born c.1521)

== See also ==
- Timeline of Scottish history
