= 1596 in Scotland =

- Centuries: 14th; 15th; 16th; 17th; 18th
- Decades: 1570s; 1580s; 1590s; 1600s; 1610s
- See also: List of years in Scotland; Timeline of Scottish history 1596 in: England • Elsewhere

Events from the year 1596 in the Kingdom of Scotland.

== Incumbents ==
- Monarch – James VI

== Births ==
- Robert Spottiswood
- 19 August – Elizabeth Stuart, Queen of Bohemia (died 1662 in England)

== Deaths ==
- Alexander Laird Garlies Sir Stewart, aged 45
- 22 February – David Wemyss of That Ilk
- 31 May – John Lesley

== See also ==
- Timeline of Scottish history
