= 1584 in Scotland =

- Centuries: 14th; 15th; 16th; 17th; 18th
- Decades: 1560s; 1570s; 1580s; 1590s; 1600s
- See also: List of years in Scotland; Timeline of Scottish history 1584 in: England • Elsewhere

Events from the year 1584 in the Kingdom of Scotland.

== Incumbents ==
- Monarch – James VI

== Events ==
- Decrees in Absence Act 1584.
- Disqualification of Ministers Act 1584.
- Sovereignty Act 1584.
- Unlawful Jurisdictions Act 1584.
- Plague in Glasgow.

== Births ==
- John Strang.

== Deaths ==
- William Ruthven, 1st Earl of Gowrie.
- Patrick Gray, 4th Lord Gray.
- October – Colin Campbell, 6th Earl of Argyll.

== See also ==
- Timeline of Scottish history
