= 1599 in Scotland =

- Centuries: 14th; 15th; 16th; 17th; 18th
- Decades: 1570s; 1580s; 1590s; 1600s; 1610s
- See also: List of years in Scotland; Timeline of Scottish history 1599 in: England • Elsewhere

Events from the year 1599 in the Kingdom of Scotland.

== Incumbents ==
- Monarch – James VI

== Events ==
- 17 April – the title Marquess of Huntly is created in the Peerage of Scotland in favour of George Gordon, 6th Earl of Huntly.
- 29 November – Royal Faculty of Physicians and Surgeons of Glasgow granted its charter by King James VI.
- 17 December – King James VI, via an act of his Privy Council, decided that Scotland should come into line with other "well governit commonwealths" and adopts 1 January as New Year’s Day. Prior to this 25 March was New Year’s Day. Thus the year 1599 commenced on 25 March 1599 and ended on 31 December 1599 - it was only 9 months long. The next date, in Scotland, was 1 January 1600. This left Scotland at odds with England, where the new year continued to be dated from 25 March. As a consequence 1 January 1600 in Scotland was 1 January 1599 in England. It is sometimes, mistakenly, said that Scotland adopted the Gregorian Calendar at this time. Whilst starting the new year on 1 January was one component of Gregorian reforms, Scotland did not adopt the two more fundamental changes in relation to (1) the computation for leap years and (2) the realignment of the calendar with the solar year, which necessitated the omission of ten days from the existing calendar. Scotland, along with England and Wales, adopted the Gregorian Calendar in 1752 under the Calendar (New Style) Act 1750 by which time the omission of eleven days from the older calendar was required.
- 28 December – issue at Holyroodhouse by William Schaw, Master of Work to the Crown of Scotland and General Warden of the master stonemasons, of the Second Schaw Statutes, significant in the history of freemasonry, particularly in relation to Lodge Mother Kilwinning. The earliest records of the Lodge of Edinburgh (Mary's Chapel) date from this year.

== Births ==
- Thomas Bruce, 1st Earl of Elgin (died 1663)
- John Gordon, 1st Viscount of Kenmure (died 1634)
- Thomas Weir, soldier and Covenanter (executed for witchcraft 1670)

== Deaths ==
- Jean Hepburn, Lady Darnley, Mistress of Caithness, Lady Morham

== See also ==
- Timeline of Scottish history
