= 1590 in Scotland =

- Centuries: 14th; 15th; 16th; 17th; 18th
- Decades: 1570s; 1580s; 1590s; 1600s; 1610s
- See also: List of years in Scotland; Timeline of Scottish history 1590 in: England • Elsewhere

Events from the year 1590 in the Kingdom of Scotland.

== Incumbents ==
- Monarch – James VI

== Events ==
- 1 May – King James VI and Anne of Denmark arrive at Leith.
- 17 May – Anne of Denmark is crowned as queen consort of Scotland at Holyrood Abbey.
- October – Battle of Clynetradwell: the forces of Alexander Gordon, Earl of Sutherland (chief of Clan Sutherland) force those of George Sinclair, Earl of Caithness (chief of Clan Sinclair) to retreat
- North Berwick witch trials begin
- Glenbuchat Castle built for John Gordon of Cairnbarrow
- The oldest known paper mill in Scotland, belonging to Mungo Russell, is recorded as operating at Dalry.

== Births ==
- 22 March – George Gordon, 2nd Marquess of Huntly, nobleman (died 1649)
- 27 April – Andrew Cant, Presbyterian minister and Covenanter (died 1663)
- May – George Jamesone, portrait painter (died 1644)
- James Roberton, advocate and judge (died 1664)

== Deaths ==
- 3 January – Robert Boyd, 5th Lord Boyd (born c.1517)

== The arts ==
- March – English printer Robert Waldegrave establishes himself in Edinburgh
- John Burrell writes The Description of the Queenis Maiesties most honourable entry into the town of Edinburgh.

== See also ==
- Timeline of Scottish history
