= Battle of Carbisdale =

Scottish civil war battle (1650)

- Part of Scotland in the Wars of the Three Kingdoms
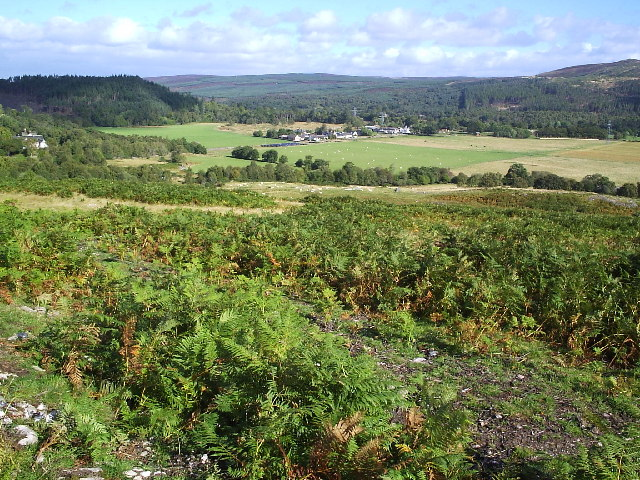
- The Royalists were in the field to the left of the village, and fled up the hill in the top-left of this photo
Date	27 April 1650
Location	Carbisdale Farm, near Culrain, Sutherland, Scotland 57°55′03″N 04°25′03″W
Result	Covenanter victory

Belligerents
Covenanters	Scottish Royalists

Commanders and leaders
Colonel Archibald Strachan; Colonel John Munro	James Graham, 1st Marquess of Montrose; Sir John Urry

Strength
300 men (five troops of cavalry and a group of musketeers); 400 clansmen (from Clan Munro and Clan Ross)	50 cavalry; 1,000 infantry (from Orkney); 500 mercenaries (Swedish, German and Danish)

Casualties and losses
Two men wounded and one drowned, "low"	450+ killed + 200 drowned; 400 plus captured

Registered battlefield
- Designated: 30 November 2011
- Reference no.: BTL19
- Location within Scotland

The Battle of Carbisdale (also known as Invercarron) took place close to the village of Culrain, Sutherland, Scotland on 27 April 1650 and was part of the Wars of the Three Kingdoms. It was fought by the Royalist leader James Graham, 1st Marquess of Montrose, against the Scottish Government of the time, dominated by Archibald Campbell, 1st Marquess of Argyll and a grouping of radical Covenanters, known as the Kirk Party. The Covenanters decisively defeated the Royalists. The battlefield has been inventoried and protected by Historic Scotland under the Scottish Historical Environment Policy of 2009. Although Carbisdale is the name of the nearest farm to the site of the battle, Culrain is the nearest village.

== Background ==
Defeat in the 1648 Second English Civil War led to the Scottish Kirk Party under Argyll replacing the Royalist Engagers in government. Argyll was deeply shocked by the Execution of Charles I in January 1649 and immediately proclaimed his son as Charles II. However, it was clear that in order to exercise real power, he would be obliged to take the National Covenants of 1638 and 1643. Argyll was determined to ensure his compliance because Charles I's refusal to do so had split the Engagers and Kirk Party in 1648.

While Charles recognised that Argyll provided the quickest way back to the throne, he was anxious to avoid making any more concessions than absolutely necessary and looked for alternatives. On 17 January 1649, Irish Protestant Royalists under James Butler, 1st Duke of Ormond agreed an alliance with the Catholic Confederation; after the king was executed on 30 January, they were joined by the Scots Presbyterian militia in Ulster.

James Graham, 1st Marquess of Montrose suggested a similar rising in Scotland and on 20 February 1649 Charles appointed him Lieutenant-Governor of Scotland and captain general of all of his forces there. This was partially driven by news of Royalist risings in Inverness and Atholl, although many of Charles's advisors were sceptical about its chances and feared needlessly antagonising the Kirk Party.

== Landing in Orkney ==
The Committee of Estates had no money to pay troops with, while the burghs in the south of Scotland had been exasperated by taxes. The former Covenanter general William Baillie had been a member of the Engagers and general John Urry (or Hurry) was now a companion of Montrose. The opposing forces were led by David Leslie, 1st Lord Newark and his subordinates Archibald Strachan and James Holborne of Menstrie. Leslie had no more than three thousand foot and fourteen hundred horse who were spread out over the Scottish Highlands. Montrose had hoped to raise as many as 10,000 men in the Highlands alone to support him. However, as it transpired the local clans did not rise up in his support, he had too few foreign troops and there was no sign of any movement in the Scottish Lowlands. By April 1650, Montrose had four to five hundred Danish troops in the Orkney Islands as well as 1,000 Orcadians, mostly untrained fishermen and farmers.

His commanders were a mixture of experienced former Royalists and mercenaries. They included James Crichton, 1st Viscount Frendraught, Sir William Johnston, Colonel Thomas Gray, Harry Graham, John Urry, Hay of Dalgetty, Drummond of Balloch, Ogilvie of Powrie, Menzies of Pitfodels, Douglas the brother of Lord Morton as well as English Royalists such as Major Lisle. Urry and 500 men were sent ahead to find a landing place on the main land and secured the Ord of Caithness for this purpose with no difficulty. Montrose and the rest of the army followed on 12 April 1650 and took shelter in the hills where they were safe from the Covenanter horse.

Meanwhile, on the opposing side, Leslie held Brahan Castle, Chanonry Castle, Eilean Donan Castle and Cromarty Castle. John Gordon, 14th Earl of Sutherland also supported the Covenanters and garrisoned Dunrobin Castle, Skibo Castle and Dornoch Castle. Montrose's movements were rapid, landing in John o' Groats and advancing on Thurso where all of the local gentry, except for the Sinclairs, signed their oath of allegiance. Leaving Harry Graham with 200 men in Thurso, Montrose marched on Dunbeath Castle which belonged to Sir John Sinclair and took it after a siege of just a few days.

Now joined by Major Sir John Sinclair, Montrose left a garrison to hold Dunbeath and linked up with Urry at the Ord of Caithness with about 800 remaining men. Finding Dunrobin Castle was too strong to take, he proceeded inland along Glen Fleet to Lairg and Loch Shin, hoping for support from Clan Munro and Clan Ross, but above all from the Clan Mackenzie. (Note: R.W Munro who was the Clan Munro Association's historian and the editor of Clan Munro Magazine disputes the account given by Buchan but also the more recent account by Wedgwood which claims that the Munros had promised to join Montrose but betrayed him. R.W Munro states that prior to the battle Mackenzie of Seaforth had been consulted by Montrose which the Munros had not and after the battle the Royalist supporter Thomas Mackenzie of Pluscarden had been permitted to speak with Montrose during his journey South in captivity. R.W Munro says the historical evidence is also against the Munros having ever shown any support for Montrose including Lord Crawford's list of supporters of Montrose before the battle, as given by Buchan, which included 2000 Mackenzies and makes no mention of the Munros. Thus rejecting Buchan's account that the Munros treacherously waited to see the outcome of the battle before joining in with it.) Meanwhile Leslie moved north to Brechin, instructing Strachan, his commander in Moray, to check Montrose's advance. Taking the garrisons from Brahan and Chanonry, Strachan advanced as far as Tain where he was reinforced by more Covenanter troops. He had 220 veteran horse, 36 musketeers as well as a reserve force of 400 Munro and Ross clansmen – who Montrose had hoped would join his force. Sutherland was sent north to oppose Harry Graham and in doing so cut off the way of retreat for Montrose in that direction.

== Strachan's approach to battle ==
On Saturday, 27 April 1650, Strachan marched west from Tain to Wester Fearn, on the southern shore of the Kyle of Sutherland, a few miles south-east of Bonar Bridge. Leslie had only left Brechin on the same day. Montrose had marched down the Strath Oykel to a spot near the head of the Kyle of Sutherland under the side of a steep hill called Craigcaoinichean and was more or less level with Carbisdale. Montrose encamped there for several days waiting for the Mackenzies to arrive. Strachan reached Wester Fearn at about 3pm on 27 April. He knew the position of the enemy and knew that he needed to draw them down from the hill to the flat ground where he could use his cavalry. He therefore concealed most of his horse among the long broom which covered the slopes of Wester Fearn, while the Munros and Rosses went up the River Carron to a place on the heights above Carbisdale where they awaited further orders.

Strachan's scout, Andrew Munro, son of John Munro of Lemlair, reported Montrose's horse had been sent out to inspect his position and advised Strachan to send out a single troop of horse to deceive the enemy into thinking that they were few in number. Strachan accordingly sent a single troop of horse up the valley and Major Lisle's reconnaissance force of 40 horse informed Montrose there was just one troop of horse opposing them. As Strachan brought up the rest of his troops from Wester Fearn, Montrose ordered his infantry to advance but made no special preparations to defend himself. Strachan divided his cavalry into three divisions, the first of around 100 led by himself in person, the second of 80 commanded by General Hacket, the third of 40 under Captain Hutcheson. A separate division included the musketeers, the Munros and Rosses, commanded by Colonel John Munro of Lemlair, Ross of Balnagowan and Quarter-Master Shaw.

== Carbisdale ==
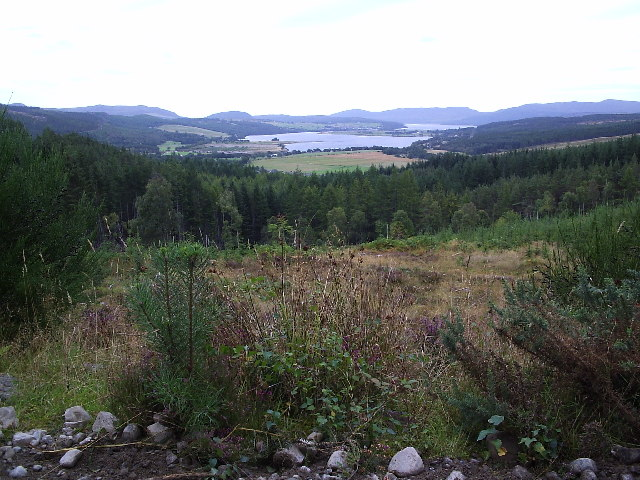
Carbisdale Wood, looking towards Bonar Bridge down the Kyle of Sutherland and with Culrain in the foreground

Strachan's plan was to advance with his own division to make it look as though his whole strength was just one hundred horse. He suddenly attacked Montrose's 40 horse who were forced backwards onto their infantry who had not been deployed for battle and were easily thrown into confusion. Montrose's foot soldiers amounted to no more than 1200, 400 of whom were Danes and Germans, and the rest raw levies from Orkney. They were not accustomed to receiving a cavalry charge unsupported and while the German and Danish mercenaries held their formation and fired into the advancing cavalry, the Orcadians fell back in disorder. Strachan's reserves, including his musketeers then fell upon the Royalists; Menzies of Pitfoddels was shot dead at Montrose's side and the remnants of his army tried to make a stand on the hillside on the wooded slopes of Craigcaoinichean. According to John Buchan, this was the point at which the Munros and Rosses committed to the battle, a claim disputed by historian Charles Ian Fraser.

The Orcadians were cut down or drowned trying to cross the Kyle of Sutherland, while Montrose had been wounded several times and his horse shot from underneath him. He escaped on Viscount Frendraught's horse, provided to him by the Viscount himself. (Note: Among the officers killed on Montrose's side were Thomas Ogilvey, Laird of Powrie, Gilbert Menzies, Laird of Pitfoddels, John Douglas, youngest son of William, Earl of Morton, Colonel J. Gordon, Major Lisle, Major Biggar, Major Guthrie, Captain Stirling (another source says he was executed), Capitain Powell, Captain Swan (another account says that he was banished but this could have been another man with the same name), Captain Erskine, Captain Garrie and Lieutenant Home (Holme).) In all, Montrose lost 450 killed and another 200 drowned, while Buchan reports Urry was captured along with 58 officers and nearly 400 soldiers. (Note: According to the Montrose Memoirs, in addition to Urry, officers taken prisoner were Crichton, Viscount Frendraught, Colonel Thomas Gray, Lieutenant-Colonel Stewart, Lieutenant-Colonel James Hay, Major Affleck, Captain John Spottiswood, Captain William Ross (banished to France for life), Captain Mortimer, Rittmaster Wallensius (possibly a Dane), Peter Suanes, Captain of Dragoons, Captain Warden (possibly an Englishman), Captain Auchinleck (possibly the same person recorded as Captain Affleck), Captain Lawson, Captain-Lieutenant Gustavus (possibly a Swede), Lieutenant Verkin (a foreigner), Lieutenant Andrew Glen, Lieutenant Rob Touch, Ernestus Buerham (possibly a Dane or Holsteiner), Laurence Van Luitenberge (possibly Dutch), Lieutenant David Drummond (banished to France), Lieutenant John Drummond, Lieutenant James Dun, Lieutenant Alexander Stewart, Cornet Ralph Marlie (Murray), Cornet Henrick Erlach (possibly a Holsteiner), Cornet Daniel Bennicke (possibly a Holsteiner), Ensign Robert Graham, Ensign Adrian Ringwerthe (possibly a Holsteiner), Ensign Hans Boaz (possibly a Holsteiner), 2 Quartermasters, 6 Sergeants, 15 Corporals, 2 Trumpeters, 3 Drummers and 386 common soldiers.)

In contrast, Strachan lost just two men wounded and one trooper drowned. His scout had been John Munro of Lemlair, while Montrose's scout had been Robert Munro of Achness, and historians have speculated that Munro of Achness had lured Montrose into a trap by giving him false information. According to the Montrose Memoirs, Munro of Achness and his three sons all escaped death or capture at Carbisdale and do not appear in the Parliamentary records of proceedings against Montrose's followers. However, historian Alexander Mackenzie states that Robert Munro of the Assynt, Inveran and Achness branch of the family, along with his two nephews, Hugh and John, were banished to the New England Colonies by Oliver Cromwell for having fought as Royalists at the Battle of Worcester just one year later in 1651.

== Death of Montrose ==
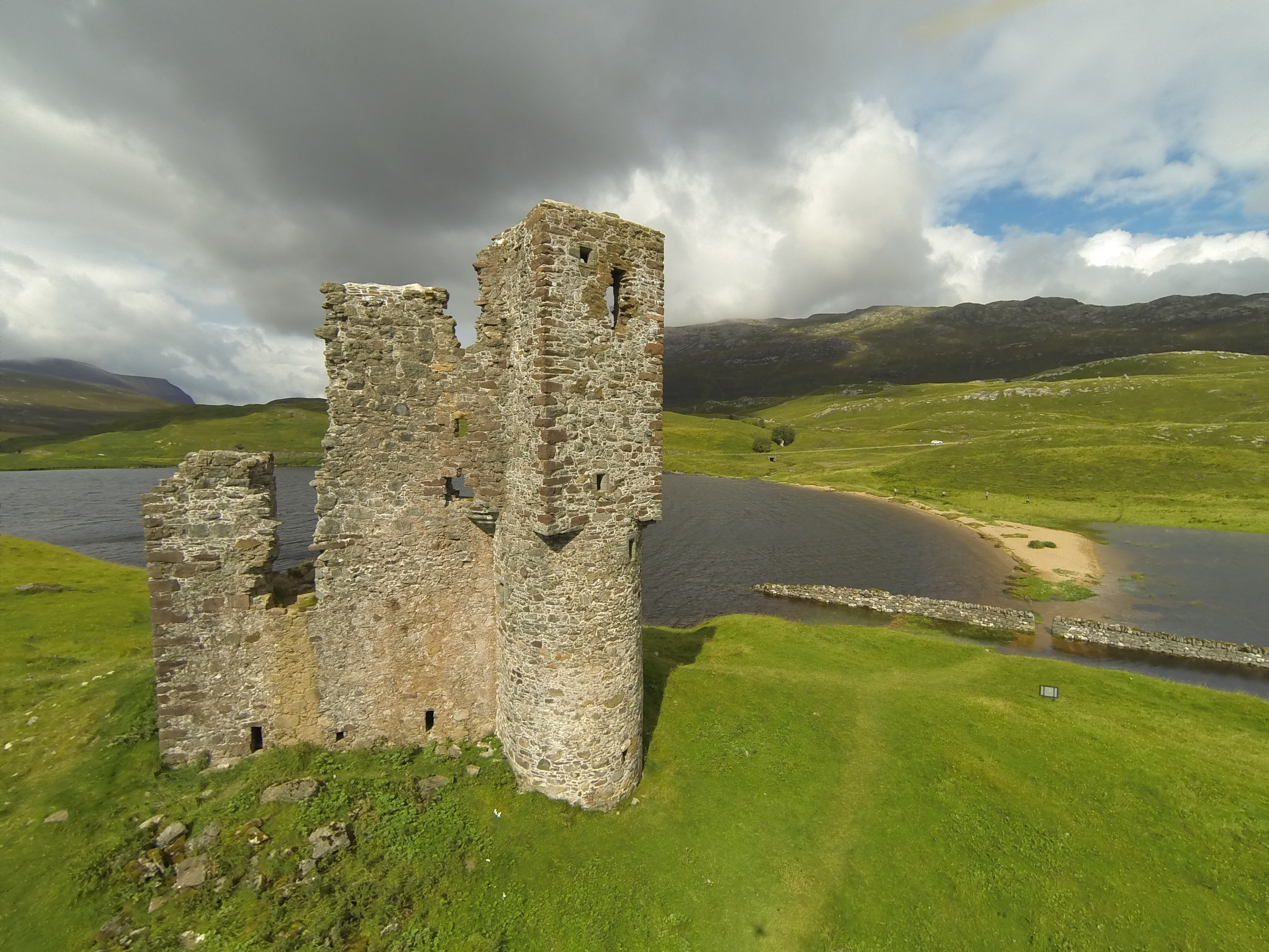
Ardvreck Castle where Montrose surrendered to Neil Macleod of Assynt after the Battle of Carbisdale

Disguised as a shepherd, Montrose managed to avoid capture until he finally made it to Ardvreck Castle, seat of MacLeod of Assynt. There is a strong tradition MacLeod served with him at Inverness in 1645 and Montrose went to Ardvreck expecting to be given shelter; however, MacLeod was away and Montrose was met instead by his wife Christian Munro, daughter of Munro of Lemlair who had fought on the opposite side at Carbisdale. She therefore confined Montrose in the castle cellars along with Major Sinclair, found wandering in the hills. MacLeod was given a £25,000 reward for turning Montrose over to his enemies. He was taken to Edinburgh where he was hanged on 21 May.

After execution his body was dismembered, the quarters publicly displayed in Aberdeen, Glasgow, Perth and Stirling and the head on the "prick on the highest stone" of the Old Tolbooth outside St Giles' Cathedral in Edinburgh, where it remained for eleven years, from 1650 until the beginning of 1661. After the Stuart Restoration in 1660, Montrose's remains were given one of the grandest state funerals ever held in Scotland. In 1707, Montrose's great-grandson, also called James Graham, the 4th Marquess, was created the 1st Duke of Montrose.

== Sources ==
- Buchan, John (1913). The Marquis of Montrose. T. Nelson Publishers.
- Cavendish, Richard (2000). The Execution of Montrose. Vol. 50. History Today.
- Fraser, C.I. of Reelig (1954). The Clan Munro. Johnston & Bacon. ISBN 0-7179-4535-9.
- Historic Environment Scotland. "Battle of Carbisdale (BTL19)".
- Keay, John; Keay, Julia (1994). Collins Encyclopedia of Scotland (2000 ed.). HarperCollins. ISBN 978-0007103539.
- Lynch, Michael, ed. (2011). Oxford Companion to Scottish History. Oxford University Press. ISBN 978-0-19-923482-0.
- Mackenzie, Alexander (1898). History of the Munros of Fowlis. A. & W, Mackenzie.
- Munro, R.W, ed. (1955). "The Munro Levies at Carbisdale". Clan Munro Magazine (5). Clan Munro Association.
- Nolan, Cathal (2008). Wars of the Age of Louis XIV, 1650–1715: An Encyclopedia of Global Warfare and Civilization: An Encyclopedia of Global Warfare and Civilization. Bloomsbury Publishing USA. ISBN 978-0313359200.
- Royle, Trevor (2004). Civil War: The Wars of the Three Kingdoms 1638–1660 (2006 ed.). Abacus. ISBN 978-0-349-11564-1.
- Saint-Clair, Roland William (1898). The Saint-Clairs of the Isles; being a history of the sea-kings of Orkney and their Scottish successors of the sirname of Sinclair. Shortland Street, Auckland, New Zealand: H. Brett.
- Scott, David (2003). Politics and War in the Three Stuart Kingdoms, 1637–49. Palgrave. ISBN 978-0333658741.
- Way, George of Plean; Squire, Romilly of Rubislaw (1994). Collins Scottish Clan & Family Encyclopedia. HarperCollins (for the Standing Council of Scottish Chiefs). ISBN 0-00-470547-5.
- Wedgwood, C. V (1998). Montrose. Sutton Publishing. ISBN 0750917539.
- Wishart, George; Murdoch, Alexander Drimmie; Simpson, Harry Fife Morland (1893). The Memoirs of James, Marquis of Montrose, 1639–1650. Longmans, Green, and Co.
