= John Black (composer) =

Scottish singer and composer

John Black (c. 1520–1587) was a Scottish singer and composer active in the Middle Renaissance period. Black was based in Aberdeen, working as a singer and assistant organist, and eventually became Master of the Song School in the city. Black at first refused to give up Catholicism during the Reformation, but by 1575 had abandoned holy orders and taken a wife.

Black wrote consorts and "lessons" on psalms as part of his work as a teacher, some of which are published in the Scottish manuscript The Art of Music, compiled in the late 1570s. A Pavan and Galliard dedicated to William Keith have also survived in Scottish manuscripts.
