= 1575 in Scotland =

- Centuries: 14th; 15th; 16th; 17th; 18th
- Decades: 1550s; 1560s; 1570s; 1580s; 1590s
- See also: List of years in Scotland; Timeline of Scottish history 1575 in: England • Elsewhere

Events from 1575 in the Kingdom of Scotland.

== Incumbents ==
- Monarch – James VI
- Regent Morton

== Events ==
- 5 March – Agnes Keith, Countess of Moray returns the Great H of Scotland to Regent Morton.
- 7 July – Raid of the Redeswire, near Carter Bar, a border incident.
- November – During Regent Morton's justice ayre at Dumfries, Lord John and Claud Hamilton hold a horse race against English borderers at Solway sands.

== Births ==
- 12 August – James Hamilton, 1st Earl of Abercorn
- David Calderwood, historian, at Dalkeith
- William Cunningham, 8th Earl of Glencairn

== Deaths ==
- 22 January – James Hamilton, Duke of Châtellerault, at Hamilton Palace.
- June – Marion Ogilvy at Melgund Castle.
- 11 November – Alexander Gordon (bishop of Galloway)
- Alexander Home, 5th Lord Home
