= 1650s in Scotland =

- Centuries: 15th; 16th; 17th; 18th; 19th
- Decades: 1630s; 1640s; 1650s; 1660s; 1670s
- See also: List of years in Scotland; Timeline of Scottish history 1650 in: England • Elsewhere

Events from the 1650s in the Kingdom of Scotland.

== Incumbents ==
- Monarch – Charles II (until his disposition in 1651)
- Commonwealth of England from 1651 until the Restoration in 1660 which reinstates Charles II.

== Events ==
- 1650:
  - 21 May – James Graham, 1st Marquess of Montrose executed in Edinburgh after his defeat at the Battle of Carbisdale.
  - 29 June – "the Lord General Cromwell went out of London towards the North: and the news of him marching Northward much startled the Scots". Oliver Cromwell leads the New Model Army to Edinburgh.
  - 3 September – Battle of Dunbar takes place between Cromwell's Army and the Scottish Covenanters. Cromwell's army wins and the battle results in southern Scotland surrendering to England; it is administered from Dalkeith.
- 1651:
  - 1 January – Charles II crowned King of Scotland at Scone Palace.
  - 20 July – Battle of Inverkeithing: The English Parliamentarian New Model Army, under Major-General John Lambert, defeats a Scottish Covenanter army acting on behalf of Charles II, led by Sir John Brown of Fordell.
  - 1 September – Siege of Dundee ends with the English Parliamentarian army, under General Monck, decisively defeating Covenanters in the last battle of the Wars of the Three Kingdoms in Scotland.
  - 3 September – Battle of Worcester takes place after Charles II has raised an army (largely from Scotland) and invaded England. It results in his defeat by Cromwell and the king escaping abroad.
- 1652: 17 June – A large fire breaks out in Glasgow, which destroys around a third of the city and leaves approximately 1,000 families homeless.
- 1653: 16 December – Cromwell is made Lord Protector of England, Scotland and Ireland.
- 1654:
  - 12 April – Cromwell creates a union between England and Scotland, with Scottish representation in the Parliament of England.
  - 5 May – Cromwell's Act of Grace, which pardons the people of Scotland for any crimes they may have committed during the Wars of the Three Kingdoms, is proclaimed in Edinburgh.
- 1658: 3 September – Cromwell dies and the title of Lord Protector passes to his son, Richard Cromwell.
- 1659:
  - 25 May – Richard Cromwell forced to resign as Lord Protector.
  - Heriot's Hospital opens in Edinburgh.

== Publications ==
- 1655 – History of the Church and State of Scotland by John Spottiswoode.

== Births ==
- 1650:
  - Sir James Dalrymple, 1st Baronet, writer and Principal Clerk of Session (d. 1719)
  - George Brown, inventor and arithmetician (d. 1730)
  - Henry Erskine, 3rd Lord Cardross, Covenanter (d. 1693)
- 1654: 23 November – George Watson, accountant (d. 1733)
- 1658: 11 April – James Hamilton, 4th Duke of Hamilton, nobleman (d. 1712)
- 1659
  - 1 January – Margaret Wemyss, 3rd Countess of Wemyss, noble (d. 1705)
  - 3 June – David Gregory, mathematician and astronomer (d. 1708 in England)
  - 13 September – Claud Hamilton, 4th Earl of Abercorn, Scottish and Irish peer (d. 1691)

== Deaths ==
- 1650:
  - 21 May – James Graham, 1st Marquess of Montrose (b. 1612)
  - 29 October – David Calderwood, divine and historian (b. 1575)
- 1654: Alexander Ross, writer (b. c.1590)
