= John Munro of Lemlair =

John Munro, 2nd of Lemlair (fl. mid 17th century) was a Scottish soldier who fought as a colonel in the Wars of the Three Kingdoms. His seat was at Lemlair House.

== Early life ==
John Munro, 2nd of Lemlair was the eldest son of Andrew Munro, 1st of Lemlair who was in turn the fifth son of Robert Mor Munro, 15th Baron of Foulis, chief of the Clan Munro.

== Military career ==
John Munro, 2nd of Lemlair entered into a military career and rose to the rank of colonel, taking a prominent part in the wars involving James Graham, 1st Marquess of Montrose from 1639 to 1649.

John Munro was a member of the assize at the Tollbooth of Inverness on 4 June 1616 when John Gordon, 14th Earl of Sutherland was served heir to his father. (Note: Historian Alexander Mackenzie incorrectly states that it was the 17th Earl of Sutherland who actually lived from 1708 to 1750.) In 1617 John Munro was amongst those chosen to help settle a dispute between the same Earl of Sutherland and Donald Mackay, 1st Lord Reay over the boundaries of their estates.

In May, 1639, John Munro, 2nd of Lemlair commanded a division of the 4000 strong Covenanter army. They went to Morayshire with the intention of opposing the advance of the Royalists to the North Highlands. They encamped at Speyside to keep the Clan Gordon and their allies from entering into Moray, remaining there until pacification was signed on 20 June. Soon afterwards John Munro of Lemlair, following the example of James Graham, 1st Marquess of Montrose severed his connection with the Covenanters and joined the Royalists.

On 22 February, 1649, John Munro of Lemlair along with Hugh Fraser, Thomas Mackenzie of Pluscardine and Sir Thomas Urquhart of Cromarty led a royalist rising in connection with plans for the Marquess of Montrose to reattempt to recover the kingdom. Now known as the Siege of Inverness (1649) they entered the town of Inverness, expelled the troops from the garrison and demolished the walls and fortifications. A Council of War was held on 26 February in which Munro was one of the members. Upon the approach of General David Leslie, Lord Newark, the Royalists retreated back into Ross-shire. Leslie managed to negotiate peaceful terms with Munro, Fraser and Urquhart but not with Mackenzie.

In 1650, Munro rejoined the Covenanter army under Colonel Strachan which was assembled at Tain. Meanwhile, the Royalist army under Montrose who had recently landed in Caithness were encamped at Culrain. Colonel Strachan sent out a party of scouts under Captain Andrew Munro, son of Colonel John Munro of Lemlair. The Munros soon reported back that Montrose had sent out a body of horse to ascertain Strachan's movements. In order to deceive this body one troop of horse was ordered out and these being the only Covenanter forces observed, the enemy reported back to Montrose thus throwing him completely off his guard into thinking that the strength of his opponents consisted of a single troop of horse and he therefore made no special arrangements to defend himself. Strachan in the meantime had formed his men into four divisions with the fourth one including the Munros and Rosses under the command of Colonel Munro and Ross of Balnagowan. In the ensuing Battle of Carbisdale the Royalists under Montrose were completely defeated.

== Family ==
Colonel John Munro married Janet, second daughter of George Gray of Skibo Castle and had the following children:

1. George Munro, 3rd of Lemlair, married Catherine, daughter of Alexander Mackenzie, 1st of Kilcoy, leaving two daughters.
2. Andrew Munro, captain in the Ross-shire Local Militia, present at the Battle of Carbisdale, later appointed major in Colonel William Lockhart's Regiment. Unmarried.
3. Robert Munro, 4th of Lemlair, captain in the army. Married Jean, eldest daughter of Kenneth Mackenzie, 1st of Scatwell, leaving three sons and two daughters.
4. John Munro, married Margaret, daughter of Rev. George Munro, Chancellor of Ross, leaving four sons and one daughter.
5. Christian Munro, married Neil MacLeod, 11th of Assynt, who captured Montrose after the Battle of Carbisdale.
6. Janet Munro, married Hugh Munro, 3rd of Findon with issue.
7. Catherine Munro, married John Polson of Merkness with issue.
8. Florence Munro, married Hector Munro, 4th of Kiltearn with issue.
9. Isobel Munro, unmarried.
10. Elizabeth Munro, married Hugh Munro, 1st of Tulloch with issue.

== Bibliography ==
- Fraser, C.I of Reelig (1954). The Clan Munro. Stirling: Johnston & Bacon. ISBN 0-7179-4535-9.
- Mackenzie, Alexander (1898). History of the Munros of Fowlis. Inverness: A. & W. Mackenzie.
- Munro, R.W (1987). Mapping the Clan Munro. Edinburgh: Clan Munro (Association). Printed by Lindsay & Co Ltd.
