= Donald Monro (priest) =

Scottish clergyman

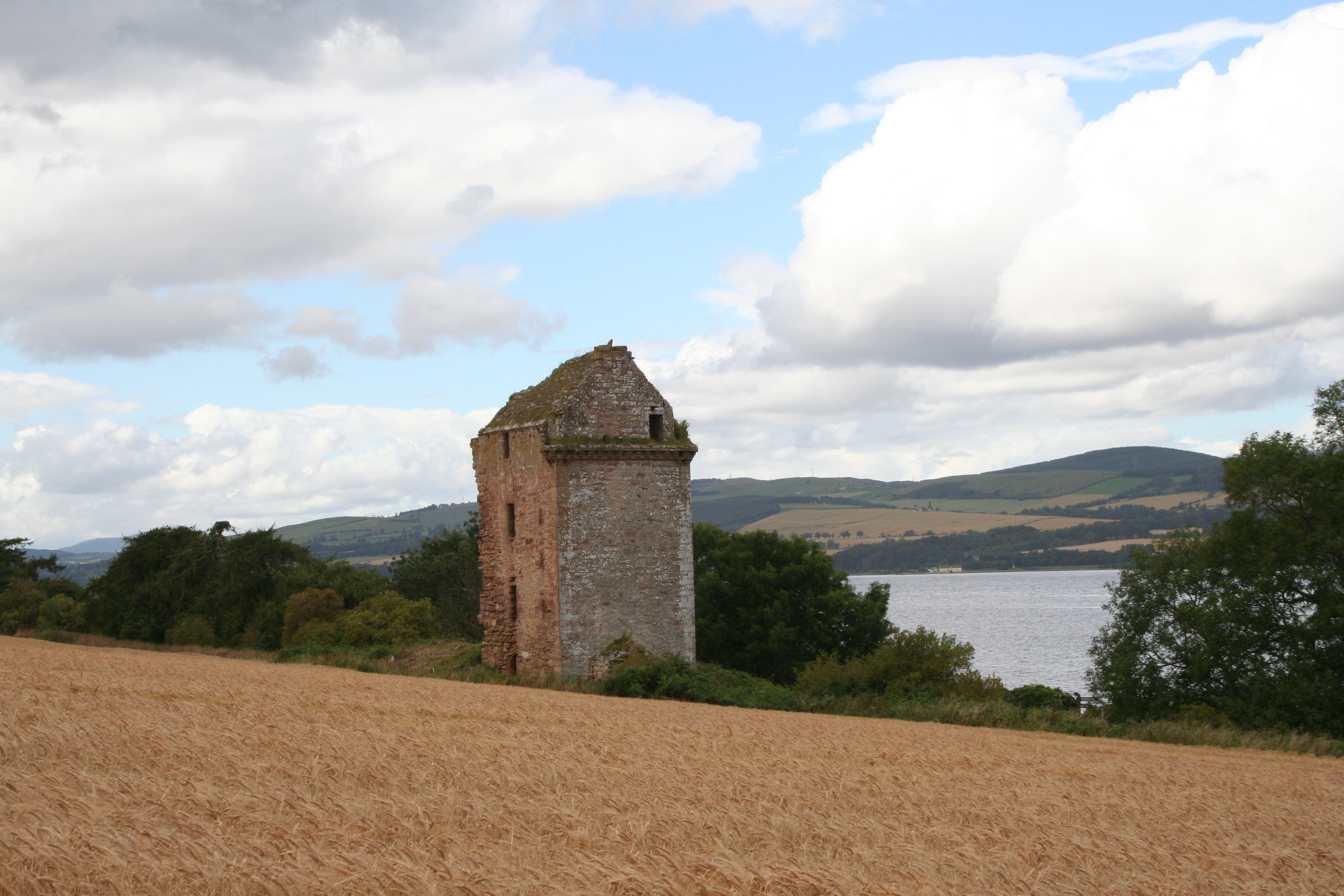
Castle Craig on the Black Isle, with the Cromarty Firth beyond. Donald Monro may have lived here in the 1560s.

Donald Monro (or Munro) (fl. 1526–1574) was a Scottish clergyman, who wrote an early and historically valuable description of the Hebrides and other Scottish islands and enjoyed the honorific title of "Dean of the Isles".

== Origins ==
Donald Monro was born early in the 16th century, the eldest of the six sons of Alexander Munro of Kiltearn, by Janet, daughter of Farquhar Maclean of Dochgarroch. His father was a grandson of George Munro, 10th Baron of Foulis (Chief of the Clan Munro) and his maternal grandfather was Farquhar MacLean of Dochgarroch, (Fearchar Mac Eachainn) Bishop of the Isles from 1529 to 1544. On Farquhar's resignation the bishopric passed to his son, and Donald Monro's uncle, Roderick MacLean (Ruaidhri Mac Gill-Eathain).

== Career ==
Monro became the vicar of Snizort and Raasay in 1526 later noting that although the latter (and the adjacent island of Rona) pertained to the Bishop of the Isles "by heritage" that in practice it was held by "M'Gyllychallan of Raarsay be the sword". These were troubled times in the Highlands and Islands, with Domhnall Dubh's attempts to resurrect the Lordship of the Isles only failing on his death in 1545. Partly as a result, the See of the Isles was one of the poorest in Scotland and although Monro lists fourteen islands as belonging to its Bishop, in practice rents were hard to collect. He was nominated to the Archdeaconry of the Isles in or shortly after 1549.

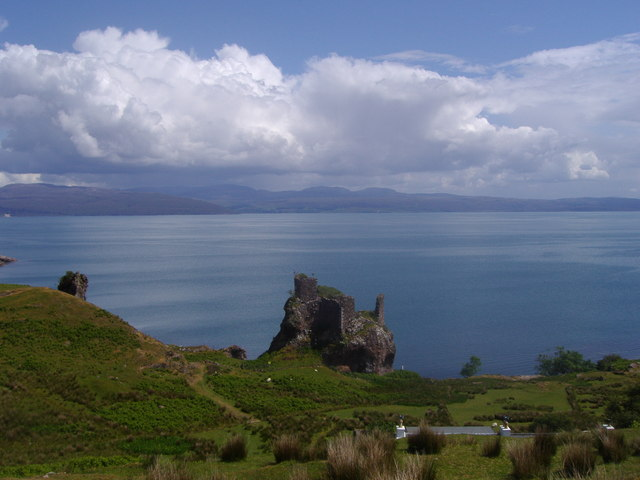
The ruins of Brochel Castle, Raasay. Monro wrote that it was one of two castles on the island and had a "fair orchard".

Monro called himself "Sir Donald", a standard style at the time for a priest who lacked a university degree, and also referred to himself as "High Dean of the Isles". His position was one of considerable influence but the advancing Reformation added further complication to the political landscape in which he was operating. He must initially have been a Roman Catholic, but following the Scottish Reformation in 1560 he adhered to the Presbyterian Church of Scotland. At some point between 1560 and 1563 he was appointed as parson of Kiltearn and he was also minister at Alness and Lemlair. In 1563, he witnessed a charter, still styling himself "Archdeacon of the Isles". At Lammas in the same year he was appointed by the General Assembly of the Church of Scotland to act as one of three special Commissioners of Ross under the Bishop of Caithness responsible for creating new kirks. The duties were arduous but he retained his position for 12 years, occasional criticism by the General Assembly concerning his lack of ability in Gaelic notwithstanding. Traditionally, he is said to have lived at Castle Craig on the Black Isle and to have crossed the Cromarty Firth to perform his duties at Kiltearn.

The period 1565–70 was one of further trouble for the Church. Monro may have been an "outlawed rebel" referred to in 1568 for his support of the cause of Queen Mary in preference to the young James VI but by 1570 he was re-instated as a Commissioner. The last record of him is dated 1574 and it is assumed he had died by 1576 when new ministers were appointed for Kiltearn, Lemlair and Alness. He never married and no extant stone marks his burial at Kiltearn, "a little to the east of the burial ground of the family of Foulis" his written work being his sole monument.

== Language skills ==
Matheson (1963) suggests that the kirk's critiques of Monro's ability in Gaelic may have been misplaced, stating that "it would be most surprising if the Gaelic of a sixteenth-century native of Kiltearn were not sufficiently adequate for his pastoral duties" and that Monro's explanations of Gaelic names are "usually accurate". Matheson does however question Monro's command of spoken Scots, noting that "it is not unknown for Gaelic speakers to write English well but to speak it very inadequately."

== Description of the Western Isles of Scotland ==
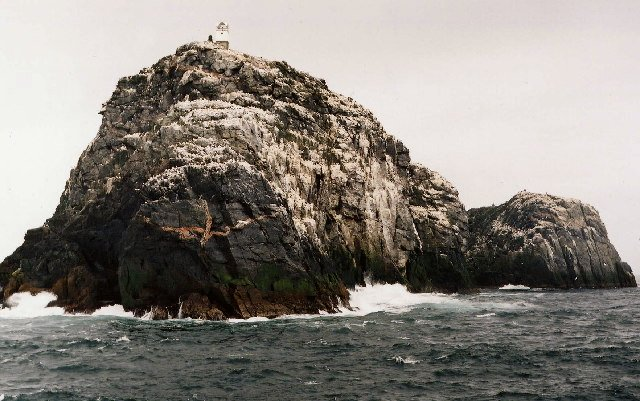
Sula Sgeir from the south west. Donald Monro wrote that the men of Ness sailed there in their small craft to "fetche hame thair boatful of dry wild fowls", a tradition that continues.

In 1563, the year he became Archdeacon, Monro visited most of the islands on the west coast of Scotland and wrote a manuscript account of them, a Description of the Western Isles of Scotland together with a brief genealogical account of various branches of Clan Donald, which was not published in any form until 1582 and not made widely available to the public in its original form until 1774. Further editions were published in 1805, 1818 and (with scholarly apparatus and including some material missing from the 1774 edition) in 1961. Monro's Description is a valuable historical account and has re-appeared in part or in whole in numerous publications about the Western Isles.

== See also ==
- Martin Martin
