= Beatrix Leslie =

Scottish midwife executed for witchcraft

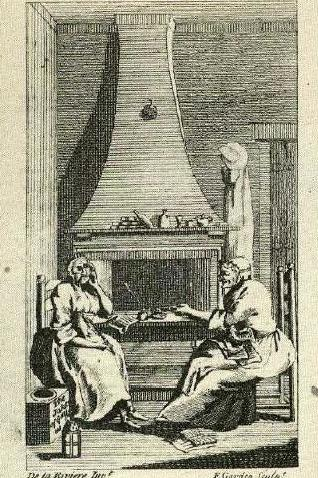
- The midwife (title page)
- Born: c.1577
- Died: 3 September 1661 (aged 83–84)
- Cause of death: strangulation and burning
- Citizenship: Scotland
- Occupation: midwife
- Known for: Accused of witchcraft following collapse of a coal pit
- Spouse: William Moffat

Beatrix Leslie (c. 1577 – 3 September 1661) was a Scottish midwife executed for witchcraft. In 1661 she was accused of causing the collapse of a coal pit through witchcraft. Little is known about her life before that, although there are reported disputes with neighbours that allude to a quarrelsome attitude.

== Background ==
Leslie was married to William Moffat. It is not known if they had any children. She lived in Blackcoat in the parish of Newbattle, Midlothian. She worked as a midwife and described during her trial how she used a knife and salt in a protective ritual during childbirth. Considering her advanced age, she was likely a skilful midwife. At the time of her arrest, Leslie would have been around 84 years old.

There are several reports that note her as argumentative. Some reports state that she uttered curses during certain disputes, after which several women claimed to have suffered harm and loss. These likely will have contributed to her conviction.

Leslie had acted as midwife for William Young and Agnes Acheson. They testified they were terrified of Leslie after their friendship had broken down; both had had nightmares that Leslie was devouring them. Indeed, when Leslie had quarreled with William Young and his wife it was "that same verry night, the said William Young awakened out of his sleep, in a great affrightment and sweat, crying out, that she with a number of catts wer devouring him."

For historian Anna Cordey "the fact that Leslie had been Acheson’s midwife did not make them trust and respect her once the relationship had failed; rather, it caused further unease because they were aware of her abilities."

== Trial ==
Leslie stood on trial in Dalkeith in 1661, a year in which many witches were prosecuted in the Lothians. She was tried together with five other women. The trial began on 20 July 1661 and concluded on 3 August 1661.

The accusations brought against her included malefice (evil harm) and demonic witchcraft. The accusation was that two girls who had angered Leslie were killed by using witchcraft to cause the roof of a coal pit to collapse on them.

The witch-pricker John Kincaid investigated Leslie by subjecting her to at least two ordeals. Firstly pricking, during which the accused was pricked with needles in several places in order to find a devil's mark. The second ordeal was the bierricht, where the accused was made to touch the corpse of their alleged victim. If upon their touch the corpse would start bleeding again, the accused was found guilty. The written records mention the two girls only bled when Leslie was made to touch their corpses.

During the ordeals, Leslie confessed to meeting the devil twice, once in the shape of a brown dog and once as a young man, agreeing to be his servant and being given the new name 'Bold Leslie'. However, she claimed to not have renounced her baptism.

== Execution ==
With the confession gathered through the ordeal she was found guilty and ordered to be executed.

She was strangled and burned on 3 September 1661.

== Historical significance ==
A few aspects of Beatrix Leslie's case are of historical significance. Firstly, her confession to a 'demonic pact', albeit as a result of her torture, and the fact she was tried as part of a group of women during a year when a great many witches were prosecuted. The nightmares experienced by Acheson and Young may be further evidence of the effect of the frightening symptoms of sleep paralysis on early modern witchcraft. Cordey also records that with Leslie's ordeal:

"This leads on to the issue of ‘charmers’ in the sense of people who offered their services as healers and diviners. Charmers were distinct from witches; they were self-professed, whereas witches were labelled by others. For most people, the local healer or charmer offered the only medical attention they could ever hope to receive. Nevertheless, a charmer could sometimes acquire a reputation for witchcraft.... In Dalkeith, it is clear that the authorities saw charming as suspicious: scratch the surface and it was likely that something more damning was going on. And charming and midwifery seem to have been linked."
