= Gilbert Jack =

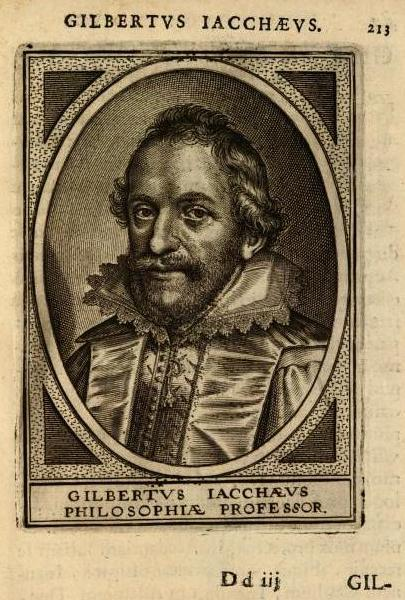
Gilbertus Jacchaeus (Leiden, 1614)

Gilbert Jack (Latinized as Gilbertus Jacch(a)eus; c. 1578 – April 17, 1628) was a Scottish Ramist philosopher and physician.

== Life ==
He was born in Aberdeen, and studied at Marischal College under Robert Howie. In 1598 he went to the University of Helmstedt.

He was professor, later of physics, at the University of Leiden, from 1605. He was dismissed in 1619, suspected of sympathy with the Remonstrants; he was reinstated in 1623.

In 1626 he held the funeral oration for his deceased colleague Willebrord Snellius.

He died in Leiden.

His students included Franck Burgersdijk and Adolph Vorstius.

== Works ==
- Institutiones Physicae (1614)
- Primae Philosophiae Institutiones (1616)
- Institutiones Medicae (1624)

The Institutiones Physicae is in nine books, and accepts the occult influence of the heavens.
