= Battle of Logiebride =

1597 clan battle in Scotland

Coordinates: 57.550°N 4.451°W

- Part of the Scottish clan wars
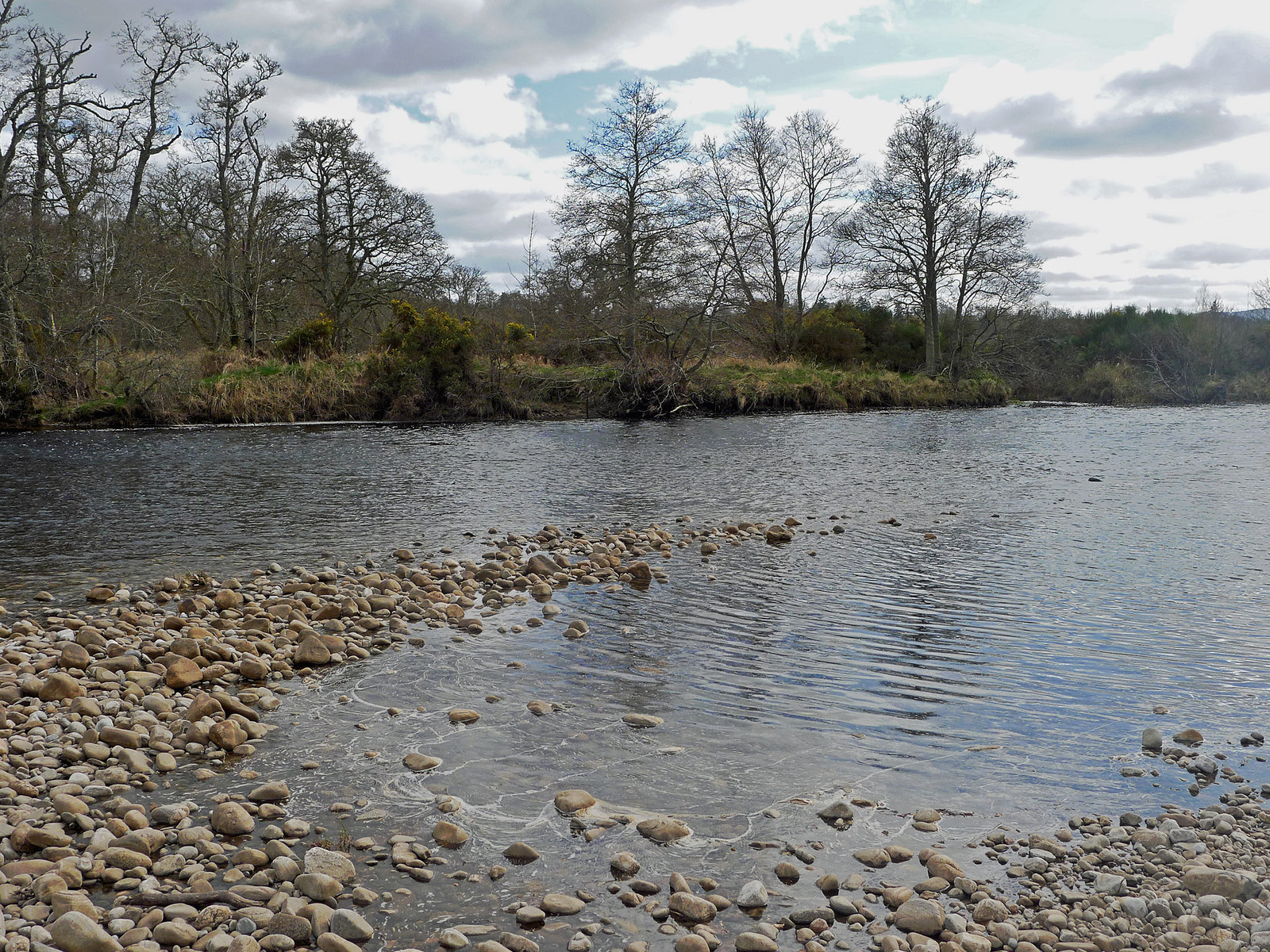
- The River Conon, near to the village of Conon Bridge where the battle took place
Date	1597
Location	Conon Bridge, Ross-shire, Scotland
Result	Results vary from different sources

Belligerents
Bains of Tulloch (Note: The Bain or Bayne family of Tulloch Castle were not part of the Clan MacBain. They were in fact a branch in the paternal line of the Clan Mackay. The progenitor of this family, John Bain Mackay, took his middle name of "Bain" as his surname instead of his real surname of Mackay); Clan Munro	Clan MacLeod of Lewis; Clan Mackenzie

Commanders and leaders
John Bain	John "Macgillichallum" MacLeod

Strength
Unknown	Unknown

Casualties and losses
According to Sir Robert Gordon (1625): 3 killed According to Alexander Mackenzie (1894): 50 killed According to Alan Mackenzie (2006): 3 killed	According to Sir Robert Gordon (1625): 5 killed According to Alexander Mackenzie (1894): 2 killed According to Alan Mackenzie (2006): 5 killed

The Battle of Logiebride or Logie-Riach, also known as a Tumult in Ross, was more of a small skirmish rather than an actual battle. The disturbance is said to have taken place on 4 February 1597 at the Logie Candlemas market near Conan House (a mile south-west of Conon Bridge) between men of the Clan Mackenzie against men of the Clan Munro and the Bain family of Tulloch Castle.

== Background ==
John MacLeod, brother, (Note: A record of the Privy Council, dated 25 Dec1595, states that he was the younger son of the Laird of Raasay, and names him Iain MacCaluim MacGillichaluim. The laird of Raasay at that time was Calum Og, son of Calum Garbh, son of Alasdair.) of the chief of the Clan MacLeod of Raasay was in dispute with the Bains of Tulloch Castle. In the ensuing battle men from the Clan Munro sided with the Bains while men from the Clan Mackenzie sided with MacLeod. However, according to Alfred John Lawrence's 1963 history of the Bain family, Alexander Bane, 2nd Laird of Tulloch's eldest son from his second marriage was Alexander Bane "The Younger of Tulloch". He was famous as "Alastair Mor Ban" because of his strength, fierceness and savage acts which concerned his father. When one of the Mackenzies claimed the Bane lands in Torridon, Alexander Bane the younger led a band of men to a public fair at Logie where they killed the Mackenzie and which resulted in the Battle of Logiebride.

== Accounts of the battle ==
=== 17th and 18th century manuscripts ===
==== Sir Robert Gordon (1630) ====
The earliest account of the Battle of Logiebride was that by Sir Robert Gordon (1580–1656) who was living at the time of the battle, in his book the History of the Earldom of Sutherland written in the early 17th century.

Gordon states that in 1597 a "tumult" happened in Ross at a fair in Laggiewreid which almost put all the neighboring counties of Ross into combustion. He states that the quarrel was between John Macgillichallum (brother to the Laird of Raasay) and Alexander Bain (brother of Duncan Bain of Tulloch). Gordon goes on to state that the Munros assisted Bain and the Mackenzies assisted John Macgillichallum, who was killed along with John Mac-Murdo Mac-William, and three others of the Clan Mackenzie. Alexander Bain escaped but on his side John Munro of Culcraggie, with his brother, Hutcheon Munro, and John Munro Robertson were killed. The Munros and Mackenzies then prepared to invade each other but were reconciled by friends and neighbors.

==== John Mackenzie of Applecross (1669) ====
John Mackenzie of Applecross wrote an account of the battle in his manuscript history of the Mackenzies in 1669. Mackenzie of Applecross stated that the year 1597 there fell out again an accident between the Mackenzies and Munros. John M'Gillichallum who was the brother of the Laird of Raasay claimed the lands of Torridon that belonged to the Bains of Tulloch. He alleged that Bain of Tulloch had promised him the land as he had been fostered by him as a child. Bain of Tulloch having died the lands went to his son Alister. Alister having got laws against John came prepared with men in arms including all of the Bains and part of the Munros to the Candlemas market at Laggievriid. John not knowing that laws were against him was at a merchant's shop buying some commodity when Alister Bain came up and struck him with a two handed sword killing him instantly. A Mackenzie tried to intervene but was struck through the back from behind and killed. The alarm was thrown up and the Bains and Munros fled in confusion with the Bains heading to the hills and the Munros to Foulis ferry. Two Mackenzies coming from the market at Chanonry and having heard what had happened allegedly killed thirteen Munros between Laggie and Mulchaich and Alister Bain's men were killed where ever they were seen. The Mackenzies having gained laws against the Munros for the killing of their kinsman burnt the lands of Lemlair. The Bains eventually submitted themselves to the Mackenzies and the Munros were reconciled by the mediation of friends.

==== Wardlaw Manuscript (1674) ====
The Wardlaw manuscript was written in about 1674 by James Fraser. Fraser states that the battle took place on the 4 February 1597 at the Candlemas fair called Bridfaire (St Bridget's Fair) in a town called Lagy Vrud (Logy, Conan), in Ross upon the river of Connin. The quarrel began between John Mackillchallim, a Mackleud (MacLeod), brother to the Laird of Rasey and another gentleman, John Bain, brother of Duncan Bain, Baron of Tulloch, near Dingwall. Fraser states that John Mackillchallum was a vile, flgitious, proflagat fellow, and ravaging robber, picking quarrels with all men, he frequented markets for the purpose of taking advantage of poor chapmen and merchant's, pillaging and robbing their shops without resistance. He was also a relation of the Mackenzies and was patronized by them. At this fair he had 6 or 7 bold followers with him. John Bain, a gallant courageous gentlemen, saw him abuse a merchant's wife and take away his goods by violence. Bain challenged him, commanding him to give it back or he would make him do it. After verba verbera from words to swords, John Bain draws upon him and gave him two or three deadly wounds. Three Mackenzies were also killed. Upon John Bain's side were killed John Monro of Cularge, and Hugh, his brother and John Monro Robertson. The chase run down the firth towards the mill of Arkaig and the wood of Milchaich, where many were wounded and some slain. John Bain with his Fraser amour bearer withdrew and deliberately escaped to Lovat. The next morning Fraser, Lord Lovat dispatched James Fraser of Phopachy to King James, being then at Falkland, with an account of what had happened. The King sent John Bain full remission and personal protection and a warrand and power to charge the Laird Mackenzie of Kintail with intercommoning, and all the accomplices of John Mackilchallim.

==== Munro family tree (1734) ====
A Munro family tree dating from 1734 only mentions two casualties and agrees with the original account written by Sir Robert Gordon that John Munro of Culcraggie and Hutcheon Munro were killed in the battle. The Munro tree of 1734 does not mention the thirteen Munro casualties mentioned by historian Alexander Mackenzie in his books the History of the Mackenzies (1894) and the History of the Munros of Foulis (1898).

=== 19th - 21st century publications ===
==== John Anderson (1825) ====
Historian John Anderson published an account of the battle in his book Historical Account of the Family of Fraser in 1825. Anderson quotes from the MSS History of the Frasers (Wardlaw Manuscript written c.1674 by James Fraser of Wardlaw) and the MSS of Mackenzies (Applecross MS History of the Mackenzies written c.1669 by John Mackenzie of Applecross). Anderson's account is very similar to that given in James Fraser's Wardlaw MS. Anderson also states that a different colour is given in the account by the Mackenzies, but that they agree on the main points.

==== Alexander Mackenzie (1894/1898) ====
Alexander Mackenzie later published an account of the battle in his book The History of the Mackenzies (1894) and a similar account in his book The History of the Munros of Fowlis (1898). In The History of Mackenzies, historian Alexander Mackenzie quotes his account of the battle "from family MSS" and Sir Robert Gordon's "Earldom of Sutherland". The "family MSS" is the Applecross MS History of the Mackenzies written by John Mackenzie of Applecross in 1669.

Alexander Mackenzie says that a "disturbance" took place at Logie-Riach, on the banks of the river Conon on 4 February 1597. It was fought between the Mackenzies against the Bains and Munros, in which several of the latter were slain. Mackenzie states that a difference arose between John MacGilliechallum brother of MacLeod, Laird of Raasay and the Bains about the lands of Torridon. Bain attended the Candlemas market at Logie with a large following of armed men which included Bains and a considerable number of Munros. Mackenzie states that John MacGilliechallum came to the fair too and while he was buying something Bain came up behind him and without warning struck him on the head with a sword killing him instantly. Mackenzie goes on to say that one of the Mackenzies tried to interfere but no sooner had he opened his mouth that he was run through the body by one of the Bains. Mackenzie states that the war cry of the Clan Mackenzie was raised and the Bains and Munros then fled followed by a band of Mackenzies, who slaughtered everyone they overtook. Mackenzie goes on to say that two Mackenzies named Ian Dubh MacCoinnich Mhic Mhurchaidh and Ian Gallda Mac Fhionnla Dhuibh having learned of the cause of the Munro's flight slew no less than thirteen of them between Logie and the wood of Millechaich. Mackenzie concludes that most of the Bains were killed and that the Munros lost no less than fifty men. The latter however is not stated in either Sir Robert Gordon's or John Mackenzie of Applecross's 17th century manuscripts.

==== Alan Mackenzie (2006) ====
A recent published account of the battle was written by Alan Mackenzie of the Clan Mackenzie Society USA and Canada, in his book, A History of the Mackenzies, and is almost identical to the earliest account written by Sir Robert Gordon, a contemporary in his book the History of the Earldom of Sutherland written the early 17th century.
