= Chanonry Castle =

Castle on Scotland's Black Isle

Coordinates: 57°34′56″N 4°07′50″W

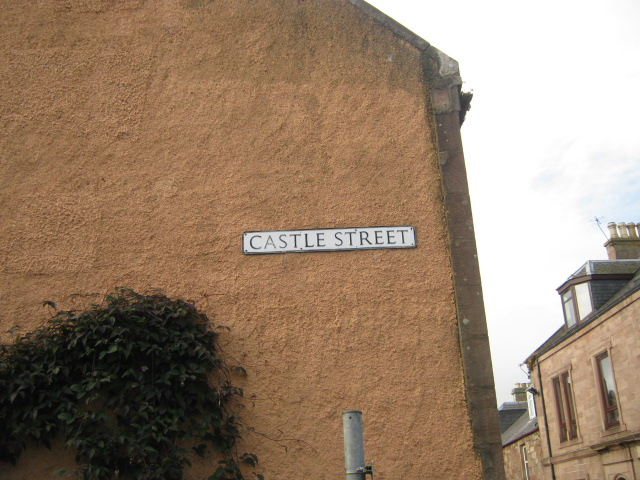
Castle Street, Fortrose, so called after the former Chanonry Castle

Chanonry Castle was located in the town of Fortrose on Scotland's Black Isle. It was built around 1500 by John Fraser, Bishop of Ross. Following the Reformation, it came into the possession of the Mackenzies of Kintail, later Earls of Seaforth. The alternative name Seaforth Castle dates from this period. The castle was dismantled on the orders of Oliver Cromwell, who needed materials for a fort at Inverness.

Nothing of the castle now remains, except a stone in the gable of a house on Station Road. The stone bears a coat of arms and the initials CBS, for Countess Barbara of Seaforth, and is thought to have been scavenged from the ruins. Countess Barbara was the wife of George, 2nd Earl of Seaforth (d. 1651).

== 16th century siege ==
Siege of Chanonry Castle
- Part of Clan Munro and Clan Mackenzie feud
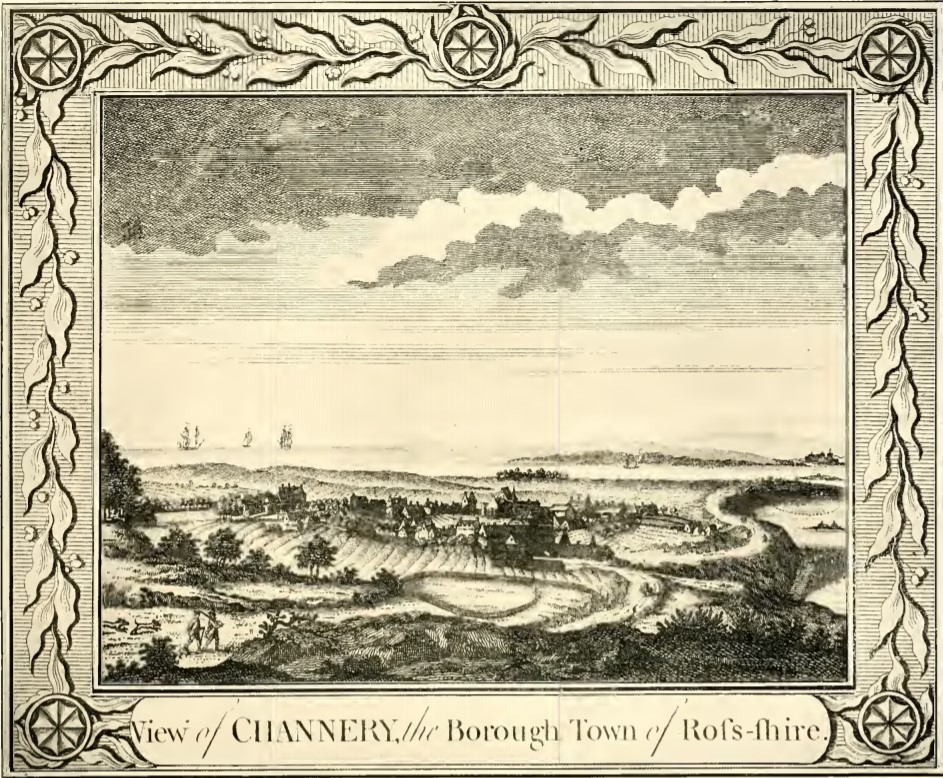
- Historic picture of the Chanonry of Ross, now the town of Fortrose
Date	1569–1573
Location	Chanonry Castle, Fortrose, Black Isle, Scotland
Result	Munros hand castle over to Mackenzies by an 'Act of Pacification'

Belligerents
Clan Munro	Clan Mackenzie; Clan Mackintosh

Commanders and leaders
Andrew Munro, 5th of Milntown	Colin Cam Mackenzie, 11th of Kintail

Strength
Unknown	3,000 men

Casualties and losses
According to Munro Writs (1572): 3 killed According to Sir Robert Gordon (1508- 1656): "great slaughter on either syd" According to George Mackenzie (1669): 3 killed According to Alexander Mackenzie (1894): 26 killed	According to Sir Robert Gordon (1580–1656): "great slaughter on either syd" According to George Mackenzie (1669): 2 wounded According to Alexander Mackenzie (1894): 2 killed and 3 or 4 wounded

Mary, Queen of Scots, made a progress in the area in August 1564, and, according to Raphael Holinshed, she visited the Chanonry of Ross.

In 1569, during the Marian civil war between the deposed Queen Mary and James VI of Scotland, a feud arose between the Clan Mackenzie and Clan Munro, who were among the most powerful clans in Ross-shire. The trouble started when John Leslie, Bishop of Ross granted to his cousin Leslie, the Laird of Balquhair, the right and title to the castle at Chanonry together with the castle lands. Bishop Leslie had been secretary to Queen Mary and there was strong feeling against episcopacy in Scotland. He therefore felt it best to arrange for the church property of his bishopric to pass into his family's hands to preserve some of the important privileges that he enjoyed as bishop. Notwithstanding this grant, the Regent Moray (James Stewart, 1st Earl of Moray), acting in the name of the infant King James VI, gave the custody of the castle to Andrew Munro, 5th of Milntown.

Regent Moray, the illegitimate son of King James V of Scotland, promised Bishop Leslie that in return for ceding the castle and lands he would give him some of the lands of the barony of Fintry in Buchan. This scheme was interrupted when, in January 1570, James Stewart, Regent Moray was shot dead, preventing Andrew Munro of Milntown from obtaining the title to the castle and lands of Chanonry; but that did not deter Munro from occupying the castle.

The Mackenzies were not pleased to see their powerful neighbours, the Munros, in possession of this castle; and recognizing the inherent weakness in Munro's title, or lack of it, they purchased from Leslie the legal title and rights and proceeded to demand possession of their rightful property from Munro. However, Munro would not cede.

Munro decided to stay put and made a new approach to the new regent, Matthew Stewart, 4th Earl of Lennox who supported Munro. The situation became even more complex when Lennox was also shot and killed in September 1571. The next regent, John Erskine, Earl of Mar, subsequently also gave his approval for Andrew Munro to retain possession of the castle, but the Earl of Mar died in October 1572 after a short illness which some sources indicate was due to poisoning.

The Mackenzies regarded the Munros as wrongful possessors of their property which they had legally purchased from Leslie. They therefore laid siege to the castle. The Munros defended the castle for three years with the loss of many lives on both sides. Finally in 1573 the Munros peacefully passed the castle to the Mackenzies under an Act of Pacification, under the terms of which Munro was awarded compensation for his expenses in occupying the castle. This affair was probably part of a wider political intrigue and the rival claims of the King's and Queen's parties, known as the Marian civil war, which ended with the 'pacification' of Perth in 1573.

During the minority of James VI, which officially ended in 1578, Munro of Milntown, and his then chief Robert Mor Munro, 15th Baron of Foulis, had charge of the Crown lands of Ross and the Black Isle. On 31 October 1578, James VI gave the "castell, hous and place of the channonrie" to Henry Stewart, 3rd Lord Methven. The Chanonry had been given to Alexander Hepburn (d. 1578), the successor to John Lesley, Bishop of Ross, who shared Queen Mary's exile. Lord Methven would receive the income from the lands until such time as a new Bishop of Ross was appointed.

In July 1589, James VI arrived at the Chanonry in person, where "he slew ane great hairt, and wes weill bancketted and ressavit by the barronis and gentilmen in the way." James was preoccupied with plans for his marriage and signed a warrant for Robert Jousie and Thomas Foulis to travel to London to buy goods for the wedding. His next stop was Boyne Castle.

=== Historical accounts of the siege ===
==== Calendar Writs of Munro of Foulis (1572) ====
The Calendar Writs of Munro of Foulis are series of contemporary legal documents concerning the Munro of Foulis family from the year 1299 to 1823 that were published in books by the Scottish Record Society in the 1940s. One of these documents is a letter dated 1572 from Andrew Munro of Milntown to the Regent of Scotland complaining that Colin Mackenzie of Kintail had "slew thre servandis of myne and left thre deidlie woundit brunt and distroyit my cornis hous and barnis in the channorie...". The letter from Munro of Milntown goes on to say that "the nowmer of thre thowsand men" (three thousand men), "asseigit the said hous be a lang space fortefeit" (laid siege to the said house that had been a long time fortified) and that "quhill at last thei seing the hous onrecoverabill" (at last they seeing the house unrecoverable) "be thair force efter thai haid committit greit harshippis upoun the Laird of Foulis and his kin" (their force after had committed great hardships upon the Laird of Foulis). Munro of Milntown also stated in his letter that the castle "was present in the handis of Walter Urquhard shereff of Cromertie" (at present in the hands of Walter Urquhart, Sheriff of Cromartie). Another letter, dated 8 July 1572, from a Richard Mader who was acting as a messenger, endorses an assurance to the king from the Munros and Mackenzies. It also mentions that the Mackenzies along with the Mackintoshes had laid siege to the Chanonry with three thousand men: "McKenze and Mcanetoische wes with thair haill hoistis to the nummer of thre thousand men or therby lying at the sege of the castell of the channory".

==== Sir Robert Gordon (1630) ====
Sir Robert Gordon (1580–1656) writes of the feud between the Munros and Mackenzies in his book A Genealogical History of the Earldom of Sutherland:

Clancheinzie grudgening, they bought the inheitance therof from Buquhayn, and thervpon they besieged the castle of the channonrie, which the Monroes defended and keipt for the space of thrie yeirs, with the great slaughter on either syd, until it was delyvered to the Clancheinzie, by the act of pacification. And this wes the ground beginning of the fead and hartburning, which, to this day remaynes betuein the Clancheinzie and Munrois.

==== George Mackenzie, 1st Earl of Cromartie (1669) ====
George Mackenzie, 1st Earl of Cromartie wrote an account of the feud in his History of the Family of Mackenzie which was written in 1669. George Mackenzie says that the Mackenzies who occupied the steeple of the church made some attempts on the castle that was occupied by the Munros but to little purpose until June 1572 when it was heard that the Munros had gone out to fish on the Ness which was one of the debatable possessions. George Mackenzie goes on to say that the Mackenzies attacked the Munros, but that the Mackenzies were so few in number that they would have been overpowered and slain had not Robert Graham the Archdeacon of Ross come to the assistance of his friend Colin Mackenzie. George Mackenzie states that the Munros fled, three of them having been killed and that only two Mackenzies were wounded. Munro of Milntown then apparently came with considerable power to revenge the rufle but 24 hours later Colin Mackenzie came with an even greater power that he could not resist. The result was that the castle was handed over to Walter Urquhart of Cromartie who was brother-in-law to Mackenzie and that Mackenzie was not to seek possession of it for twenty days in which time Munro of Foulis obliged Munro of Milntown that he should not make any attempt on the property and that he should only address the Regent Morton and the Lords on the matter. The Regent and the Lords later gave their approval to Colin Mackenzie.

==== John Mackenzie of Applecross (1669) ====
John Mackenzie of Applecross wrote his manuscript history of the Mackenzies at around the same time that George Mackenzie, 1st Earl of Cromartie wrote his and the two tally closely in details. It has therefore been suggested that they derive from a common source. Mackenzie of Applecross's account, like Cromartie's, states that the Mackenzies were supported and relieved by Robert Graham the Archdeacon of Ross during the skirmish. However, while similar to the Earl of Cromartie's account, Mackenzie of Applecross states that twenty-six Munros were killed and not just three, but agrees with Cromartie that only two Mackenzies were wounded. John Mackenzie of Applecross's manuscript states that after that skirmish the Munros were never able to keep out ye Castle, but delivered it to Colin Mackenzie on his return from Edinburgh because he had got all order of law against them.

==== Alexander Mackintosh-Shaw (1880) ====
Alexander Mackintosh-Shaw gave an account of the feud in his book Historical Memoirs of the House and Clan of Mackintosh and of the Clan Chattan (1880). He states that the Frasers supported the Munros and that the Mackintoshes supported the Mackenzies. The feud was ended after much blood-shed, when arbiters, one of whom was Lachlan Mor Mackintosh, 16th of Mackintosh, decided that it belonged to Mackenzie.

==== Alexander Mackenzie (1894/1898) ====
Alexander Mackenzie wrote an account of the feud in his books The History of the Mackenzies (1894) and The History of the Munros of Fowlis (1898). Alexander Mackenzie repeats the story given by George Mackenzie, 1st Earl of Cromartie and John Mackenzie of Applecross that the Mackenzies and Mackintoshes occupied the steeple of the church and that an attempted sortie by the Munros for fish at a nearby loch was foiled. However, Alexander Mackenzie implies that the Mackenzies took control of the castle by force after the skirmish, contrary to the manuscripts which show that it was handed over. Alexander Mackenzie gives the number of Munros killed as twenty-six in accordance with John Mackenzie of Applecross's manuscript of 1669. He does however increase the number of Mackenzies wounded from two, to three or four, and adds that two Mackenzies were killed.

== 17th and 18th century Civil Wars ==
Later during the Scottish Civil War of the 17th century the Mackenzies were still in possession of the castle. Their chief George Mackenzie, 2nd Earl of Seaforth supported the Scottish Covenanters and in 1646 the royalist commander, John Middleton, 1st Earl of Middleton, laid siege to the castle and took it from the Mackenzies after a siege of four days. In 1649, after the Siege of Inverness (1649), the leader of the Scottish Parliamentary army, David Leslie, Lord Newark, left a garrison in the castle. However, soon afterwards the Mackenzies retook the castle from the Parliamentary forces. The Parliamentary forces responded by taking the Mackenzies' Redcastle and hanged the garrison.

A 17th-century poem by the Brahan Seer concerning Chanonry Castle predicted that: "The day will come when, full of the Mackenzies, it will fall with a fearful crash."

== See also ==
- Castles in Scotland
- Castles in the United Kingdom
