= Knockbain =

Scottish parish

Coordinates: 57°32′N 4°16′W

- Location within the Highland council area
- Council area: Highland
- Lieutenancy area: Ross and Cromarty
- Country: Scotland
- Sovereign state: United Kingdom
- Police: Scotland
- Fire: Scottish
- Ambulance: Scottish

Knockbain (Scottish Gaelic: An Cnoc-bàn) is a parish on the Black Isle, in the county of Ross and Cromarty in Highland council area, Scotland. It includes the villages of North Kessock, Munlochy and Kilmuir.

The parishes of Kilmuir Wester and Suddie were united in the 1750s, to form the parish of Knockbain.

There are multiple listed buildings in Knockbain, Highland.

Churches and cemeteries in Knockbain.
