= 1660s in Scotland =

- Centuries: 15th; 16th; 17th; 18th; 19th
- Decades: 1640s; 1650s; 1660s; 1670s; 1680s
- See also: List of years in Scotland; Timeline of Scottish history 1660 in: England • Elsewhere

Events from the 1660s in the Kingdom of Scotland.

== Incumbents ==
- Monarch – Charles II (since May 29, 1660)

== Events ==
- 1660:
  - 1 January – Colonel George Monck with his regiment crosses from Scotland to England at the village of Coldstream and advances towards London in support of the English Restoration.
  - 29 May – Charles II is crowned King of England, Scotland and Ireland.
  - 21 December – Mercurius Caledonius established in Edinburgh, the first example of a newspaper in Scotland, running until 1661.
- 1661:
  - January – An independent Parliament of Scotland is restored; it is called the "Drunken Parliament" by John Welsh of Irongray.
  - 28 March – Parliament of Scotland passes the Rescissory Act 1661 which effectively annuls the legislation of all parliaments since 1633.
  - April – Great Scottish Witch Hunt of 1661–62 begins.
- 1663:
  - 28 September – The murder of Alexander MacDonald, 12th of Keppoch and his brother Ranald by their cousins, known as the Keppoch murders.
- 1664:
  - Methven Castle built.
- 1666:
  - 28 November – Battle of Rullion Green, part of the Pentland Rising, a failed uprising by the Covenanters.
- 1667:
  - 29 April–1 May – A Dutch flotilla under Admiral van Ghent enters the Firth of Forth and bombards Burntisland as part of the First Anglo-Dutch War.
  - Archibald Campbell, 9th Earl of Argyll, is granted Kinlochkilkerran on which he will develop Campbeltown.
- 1669:
  - 7 June: King Charles grants the 'First Indulgence', allowing moderate Presbyterian ministers to be reappointed to their livings.
  - 2 August: John Maitland, Earl of Lauderdale, is granted the royal appointment of Lord High Commissioner to the Parliament of Scotland.
  - 19 October: The Parliament of Scotland opens its first new session in six years (although two Conventions of Estates have been held briefly in 1665 and 1667). The session is opened in Edinburgh by Charles in his capacity as King of Scotland and closes in December. Legislation passed includes:
    - Act of Supremacy, recognising the King's authority over the Kirk
    - Militia Act, giving the King power to raise 20,000 men in Scotland.
    - Act against conventicles.
    - Act for annexation of Orkney and Shetland to the Crown.

== Births ==
- 1661:
  - 6 October – William Dunbar, bishop (d. 1746)
- 1662:
  - 15 February – James Renwick, Covenanter (executed 1688)
  - 5 August – James Anderson, lawyer and historian (d. 1728)
  - 19 November – John Campbell, 2nd Earl of Breadalbane and Holland, politician (d. 1752)
  - 18 December – James Douglas, 2nd Duke of Queensberry politician (d. 1711)
- 1663:
  - 8 May – Lord James Murray, English-born politician (d. 1719)
- 1664:
  - 14 September – John Blackadder, soldier (died 1729)
- 1665:
  - 25 December – Lady Grizel Baillie, songwriter (d. 1746)

== Deaths ==
- 1661:
  - 27 May – Archibald Campbell, 1st Marquess of Argyll, nobleman, executed in Edinburgh for treason (b. 1607)
  - 18 August – Robert Gordon of Straloch, poet, mathematician, antiquary and geographer (b. 1580)
- 1662:
  - 3 September – Beatrix Leslie, midwife, executed for witchcraft (b. c.1577)
- 1663:
  - 21 December – Thomas Bruce, 1st Earl of Elgin, nobleman (b. 1599)
