= 1570 in Scotland =

- Centuries: 14th; 15th; 16th; 17th; 18th
- Decades: 1550s; 1560s; 1570s; 1580s; 1590s
- See also: List of years in Scotland; Timeline of Scottish history 1570 in: England • Elsewhere

Events from 1570 in the Kingdom of Scotland.

== Incumbents ==
- Monarch – James VI
- Regent Moray, followed by Regent Lennox.

== Events ==
- 14 February – Funeral of Regent Moray at St Giles' Cathedral.
- April – Nageir the Moor, a courtier, leaves Scotland.
- 12 July – Matthew Stewart, 4th Earl of Lennox is elected and proclaimed Regent of Scotland at the Tolbooth of Edinburgh.
- Battle of Bun Garbhain

== Births ==
- 13 April – Simon Fraser, 6th Lord Lovat

== Deaths ==
- 23 January – James Stewart, 1st Earl of Moray, Regent of Scotland, assassinated by James Hamilton of Bothwellhaugh at Linlithgow.
- February – Henry Balnaves, lawyer and Protestant reformer.
- 15 April – John Wood, assassinated.
- 7 September – Euphemia Leslie, Prioress of Elcho.

== Buildings ==
- Mar's Wark at Stirling has datestones of 1570 and 1572.

== Publications ==
- Ane Prettie Mirrour, or Conference betuix the faithful Protestant and the Dissemblit false Hypocreit, by William Lauder, printed by Robert Lekpreuik in Edinburgh.
- The Regentis Tragedie, by Robert Sempill the elder, printed by Robert Lekpreuik in Edinburgh and John Awdely in London.
