= 1554 in Scotland =

- Centuries: 14th; 15th; 16th; 17th; 18th
- Decades: 1530s; 1540s; 1550s; 1560s; 1570s
- See also: List of years in Scotland; Timeline of Scottish history 1554 in: England • Elsewhere

Events from the year 1554 in the Kingdom of Scotland.

== Incumbents ==
- Monarch – Mary, Queen of Scots
- Mary of Guise inaugurated as Regent, in succession to James Hamilton, Duke of Châtellerault

== Events ==
- 12 April – Mary of Guise is declared Regent of Scotland at a meeting of the Parliament of Scotland in Edinburgh.
- 28 December – Edinburgh burgh council resolves to produce a play written by William Lauder (poet), probably as a New Year's Day gift to Mary of Guise.

== Births ==
- Robert Bruce of Kinnaird
- William Douglas, 10th Earl of Angus
- James Lindsay, 7th Lord Lindsay

== Deaths ==
- 29 August – Norman Leslie (soldier), veteran of the siege of St Andrews Castle.

== Buildings and architecture ==
- 22 May – Date carved as "XXII MAY 1554" on the sill of an armorial panel of George Durie at Rossend Castle.

== Literature ==
- Jephthes, sive Votum, a tragedy by George Buchanan is published in Paris.

== See also ==
- Timeline of Scottish history
- 1554 in England
- 1554 in Wales
- 1554 in Ireland
