= 1557 in Scotland =

- Centuries: 14th; 15th; 16th; 17th; 18th
- Decades: 1530s; 1540s; 1550s; 1560s; 1570s
- See also: List of years in Scotland; Timeline of Scottish history 1557 in: England • Elsewhere

Events from the year 1557 in the Kingdom of Scotland.

== Incumbents ==
- Monarch – Mary, Queen of Scots
- Mary of Guise rules as Regent.

== Events ==
- 13 June – An English force commanded by Sir John Clere is defeated at Kirkwall with many casualties.
- October – Mary of Guise at Hume Castle sends an army towards England. Instructed to attack Wark Castle, the Scottish lords hold their own council at Eckford and return home.

== Births ==
- 11 April – John Wemyss (landowner).

== Deaths ==
- 22 January – Archibald Douglas, 6th Earl of Angus.
- February – Lady Agnes Stewart.
- 6 December – John Macalpine.
- James Stewart, Commendator of Kelso and Melrose.

== See also ==
- Timeline of Scottish history
- 1557 in England
- 1557 in Wales
- 1557 in Ireland
