= 1562 in Scotland =

- Centuries: 14th; 15th; 16th; 17th; 18th
- Decades: 1540s; 1550s; 1560s; 1570s; 1580s
- See also: List of years in Scotland; Timeline of Scottish history 1562 in: England • Elsewhere

Events from 1562 in the Kingdom of Scotland.

== Incumbents ==
- Monarch – Mary, Queen of Scots

== Events ==
- 1 January – The poet Alexander Scott may have presented Ane New Yeir Gift to Quene Mary at Seton Palace.
- 8 February – Agnes Keith marries James Stewart, 1st Earl of Moray at St Giles, Edinburgh.
- 1 April – A royal guard of archers is created.
- April – James Hamilton, 3rd Earl of Arran, talks of conspiracy theories and is confined as insane.
- 22 May – The burgh council of Edinburgh decides to have a ducking stool at the Nor Loch for punishing "fornicatouris" and adulterers.
- 9 September - Mary, Queen of Scots, on her first northern progress, besieges Inverness Castle.
- 28 October – Battle of Corrichie

== Births ==
- December – Francis Stewart, 5th Earl of Bothwell
- William Seton of Kylesmure, courtier and administrator

== Deaths ==
- 20 February – Janet Stewart, Lady Fleming, former governess of Mary, Queen of Scots
- 28 October – George Gordon, 4th Earl of Huntly
- John Campbell of Lundy, lawyer and treasurer of Scotland
- William Murray of Tullibardine
