= 1560 in Scotland =

- Centuries: 14th; 15th; 16th; 17th; 18th
- Decades: 1540s; 1550s; 1560s; 1570s; 1580s
- See also: List of years in Scotland; Timeline of Scottish history 1560 in: England • Elsewhere

Events from the year 1560 in the Kingdom of Scotland.

== Incumbents ==
- Monarch – Mary I

== Events ==
- 7 January – French troops commanded by Henri Cleutin and Captain Corbeyran de Cardaillac Sarlabous sail across the Firth of Forth from Leith, which they are occupying, and fight with the Lords of the Congregation at Pettycur Bay near Kinghorn.
- 27 February – Treaty of Berwick: Terms are agreed upon with the Lords of the Congregation in Scotland for forces of the Kingdom of England to enter Scotland, to expel French troops defending the Regency of Mary of Guise.
- 18 March – Battle of Glasgow: Scottish troops are cut to pieces by the French.
- 7 May - English troops at the siege of Leith attempting to storm the fortified town held by French troops suffer a heavy defeat.
- 6 July – The Treaty of Edinburgh is signed between Scotland, France and England, ending the Siege of Leith. The French withdraw from Scotland, largely ending the Auld Alliance between the two countries, and also ending the wars between England and its northern neighbour.
- 17 August – Papal Jurisdiction Act 1560: The Scottish Reformation Parliament rejects papal authority, beginning the Scottish Reformation and disestablishing Roman Catholicism in Scotland.
- 27 August – The Scottish Reformation Parliament adopts the Protestant Scots Confession of faith.

== Births ==
- 19 August – James Crichton, polymath (k. 1582)

== Deaths ==
- 11 June – Mary of Guise, queen consort of James V and regent of Scotland (dropsy) (b. 1515)

== See also ==
- Timeline of Scottish history
- 1560 in England
