= 1547 in Scotland =

- Centuries: 14th; 15th; 16th; 17th; 18th
- Decades: 1520s; 1530s; 1540s; 1550s; 1560s
- See also: List of years in Scotland; Timeline of Scottish history 1547 in: England • Elsewhere

Events from the year 1547 in the Kingdom of Scotland.

== Incumbents ==
- Monarch – Mary I
- Regent Arran

== Events ==
- 11 March – During the Siege of St Andrews Castle, Patrick Gray, 4th Lord Gray, makes a pledge to Edward VI of England. This contract states that for English assistance in reinstating his rights over Perth, and the return of his brother, who is a hostage ("pledge") in England, Gray would further the marriage of Mary, Queen of Scots to Edward VI, and deliver Broughty Castle and the Spey Tower at Perth to the English army.
- 29 June – A fleet of 21 French galleys, commanded by Leone Strozzi, arrives at Fife and joins the Siege of St Andrews Castle. The siege continues for a month before John Knox and Protestant nobles surrender on 31 July.
- 17 July – After the Earl of Arran, Regent of Scotland for Mary, Queen of Scots, is unable to get England to return control of Langholm to Scotland voluntarily, he "reduces it by force."
- 10 September – Battle of Pinkie (Cleugh): An English army under the Duke of Somerset, Lord Protector of England, defeats a Scottish army under James Hamilton, 2nd Earl of Arran, the Regent. The great Highland bagpipe is perhaps heard in the field. The English seize Edinburgh and Hume Castle is surrendered to them by Mariotta Haliburton.
- December – English Royal Navy officer Thomas Wyndham sails two ships to Dundee to support the English garrison at Broughty Castle commanded by Andrew Dudley, then investigates the River Tay towards Perth looking to rob church roofs to make lead bullets.
- 25 December – Wyndham burns Balmerino Abbey.
- 28 December – English soldier Sir John Luttrell, recently victorious in the Battle of Pinkie, raids Burntisland on the Firth of Forth, after Wyndham, his uncle, has brought his ships to the port; they burn ships and buildings on the pier and capture Rossend Castle.
- 29 December – Wyndham burns Elcho Nunnery.
- Lochwood Tower in Annandale is taken by the English.

== Births ==
- 20 January – Laurence Bruce, politician (died 1617)

== See also ==
- Timeline of Scottish history
- 1547 in England
- 1547 in Ireland
