= Siege of Thionville (1558) =

1558 Unsuccessful Spanish siege of Thionville

- Part of Italian War of 1551–59
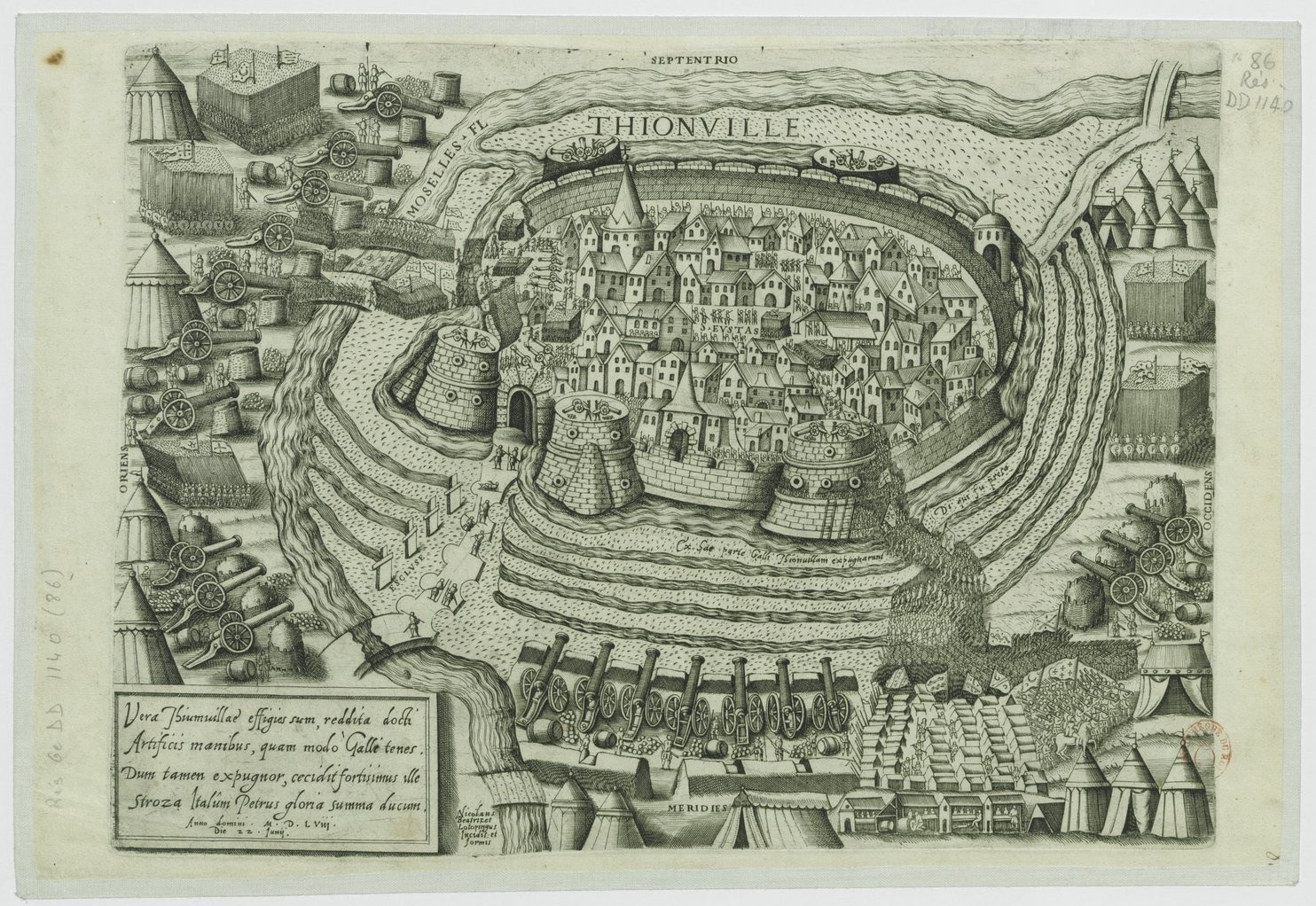
Date	17 April – 23 June 1558
Location	Thionville 6.1692°N 49.3589°E
Result	French victory

Belligerents
Holy Roman Empire; (Spain) Spanish Empire	Kingdom of France

Commanders and leaders
Jean Carrebe	Francis, Duke of Guise seigneur de Vieilleville; Piero Strozzi †

Strength
3,000; 50 culverins or other artillery pieces	12,000–14,000; 30,000

Casualties and losses
1,500	400 dead 1,000 wounded

The siege of Thionville was the siege of the town of Thionville during the Italian War of 1551–59. It was held by the Spanish against a French force under Francis, Duke of Guise and others. It lasted from 17 April to 23 June 1558 and resulted in a French victory.

== Course ==
Guise's capture of Calais allowed him to counter-attack the Spanish. Henry II of France decided to concentrate his forces against Thionville, then one of the strongest towns held by Charles V, Holy Roman Emperor and thought to be impregnable. It threatened the French town of Metz, which sent out twenty bands of infantry and artillery. They were joined by one company of gendarmes, one of light cavalry under the comte d'Espinay and other infantry and cavalry, mainly from Toul and Verdun. These all arrived before on 26 April 1587 to reinforce the seigneur de Vieilleville's troops, which had invested the town nine days earlier. The arrival was not marked with drums or fanfares in an attempt to keep it secret from the besieged forces.

Vieilleville set up pontoon bridges and anchored buoys in the fords. He had also dug in twelve emperor-calibre (33 pound 4 ounce - 34 pound) cannon, six grand culverins (15 pound 2 ounce - 15 pound 4 ounce) and other field pieces. Other troops came to reinforce the besiegers from Brie, Champagne, Bassigny, the Duchy of Orléans and other places, along with six cornets of cavalry, one each from Henry of Brunswick-Dannenberg (second son of Ernest I, Duke of Brunswick-Lüneburg), the younger son of the duke of Zweibrucken, the bastard son of Christoph, Duke of Württemberg and the nephews of Johann von der Leyen (archbishop of Trier), Daniel Brendel von Homburg (archbishop of Mainz) and George, Duke of Symerch.

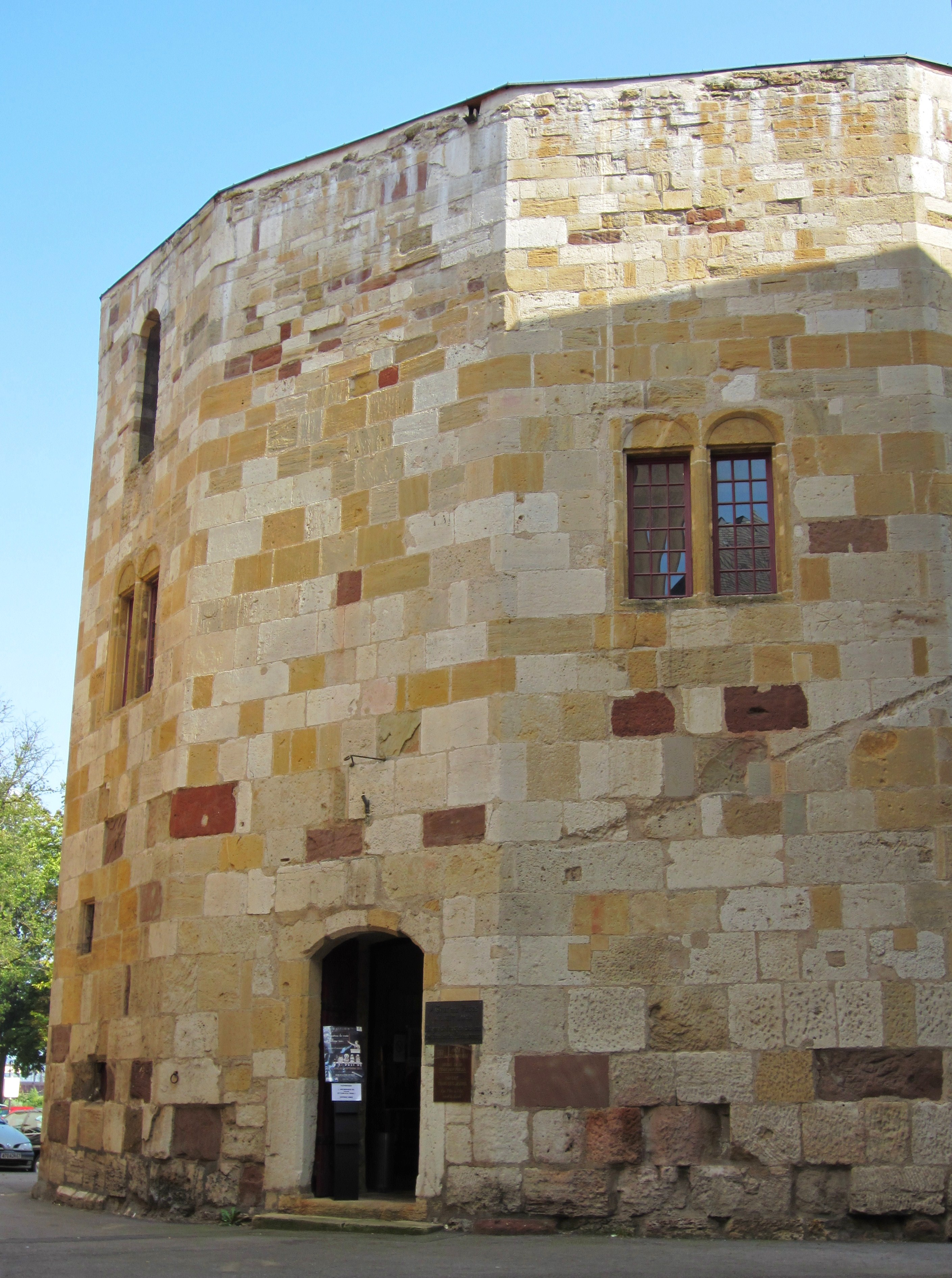
The Tour aux Puces at Thionville.

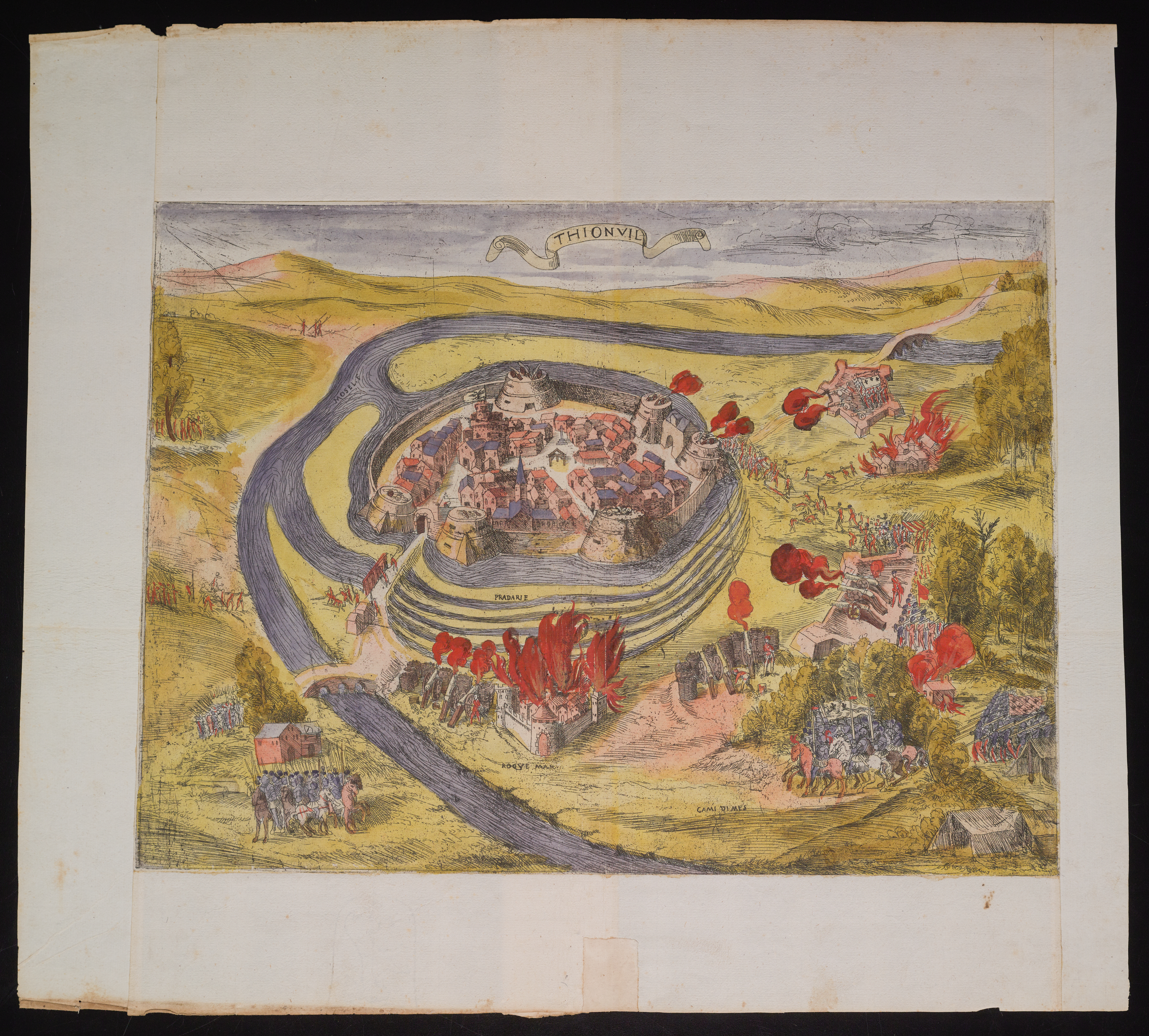
Ulrico Hoepli print showing the siege.

On 17 April Vieilleville's first troops arrived outside the town walls and dug siegeworks at key points, cutting off the food supply to the city. On 26 April the German troops arrived, along with the other French reinforcements sent by Imbert de Bourdillon, allowing the town to be completely surrounded. Early in May Guise sent a message demanding that the seigneur de Vieilleville await his arrival with a further 400 men at arms, 500 light cavalry and 1,000 mounted arquebusiers - he and Piero Strozzi finally arrived at the town on 28 May. This meant that the French force now totalled around 12,000 men, though other sources estimate it at 12,000-14,000 or even 10,000 French and 20,000 German. The garrison was only around 3,000 men and 50 culverins and other artillery pieces, commanded by Jean Carrebe, a 'judicature' or judge from the mairie of Louvain.

Vieilleville thus immediately prepared fifteen large boats and twenty smaller ones with artillery pieces and enough powder to fire 15,000 shot. The combined force headed for a village or farm on the Moselle called Neufville-aux-Noyers, where he set up his headquarters. G.F. Teissier's Histoire de Thionville stated there was no village or farm of this name on or near the Moselle, raising the possibility that it was wiped off the map during the siege. Philippe de Montmorency-Nivelle and three troops of experienced Spanish soldiers tried to get help to the town during the first night of the siege, but the approaches were so well guarded that they were forced to retire towards the city of Luxembourg. Two days later four companies from Flanders and Namur, with fifty cavalry in total, also unsuccessfully tried to break through to the city. The Spanish then made no further attempts to relieve it.

On the third day the French mounted an emperor-calibre cannon on the banks of the Moselle and the six large culverins only 1,500 paces from the town. This severely damaged the town's defences and destroyed all its artillery. The Franco-German force then attacked by the right bank of the Moselle, aiming at Tour-aux-Puces and the fortifications on the town's south-east side. These were breached and French soldiers launched an assault, but they lost around one hundred men and were repulsed. During the four following days the town and the French exchanged musket fire. On 21 June Strozzi visited the artillery positions with a view to moving the six grand culverins to a new dugout closer to the wall, but he was hit in the throat at 500 paces by a musket shot, dying thirty minutes later. His death was carefully kept secret, however, to avoid damaging the men's morale. It also allowed Vieilleville to re-assume overall command of the siege and he decided to attack the town from the left bank. The six grand-culverins were no longer any use in their old positions and so he ordered them moved into a thicket ideally placed to fire upon the defences on the main street and at porte de Luxembourg and had new trenches cut for them, as well as requesting that Metz send further cannon.

Four cannon fired on a single tower for a whole hour, leaving it looking more like a dovecote, and when a breach was made in the wall the French troops threw themselves into the gap and captured the tower. Vieilleville led 100-120 pioneers to begin a sap, then moved two cannon into it. These fired four or fire shot into the inside of the town, shaking the town wall. The day after Vieilleville "armed all his limbs, as if on the day of a battle, with greaves, knee guards, cuissots, breastplate, forearm and upper-arm guards and a helmet on his head, the visor lowered to the solerets, presented himself with his favourite troops, gendarmes and arquebusiers to enter the town or die [in the attempt]." The whole town came to fight off the first assault, which was repulsed, but thirty Frenchmen soon mounted a second one, getting into the town with the shout "France! France! The town is won!".

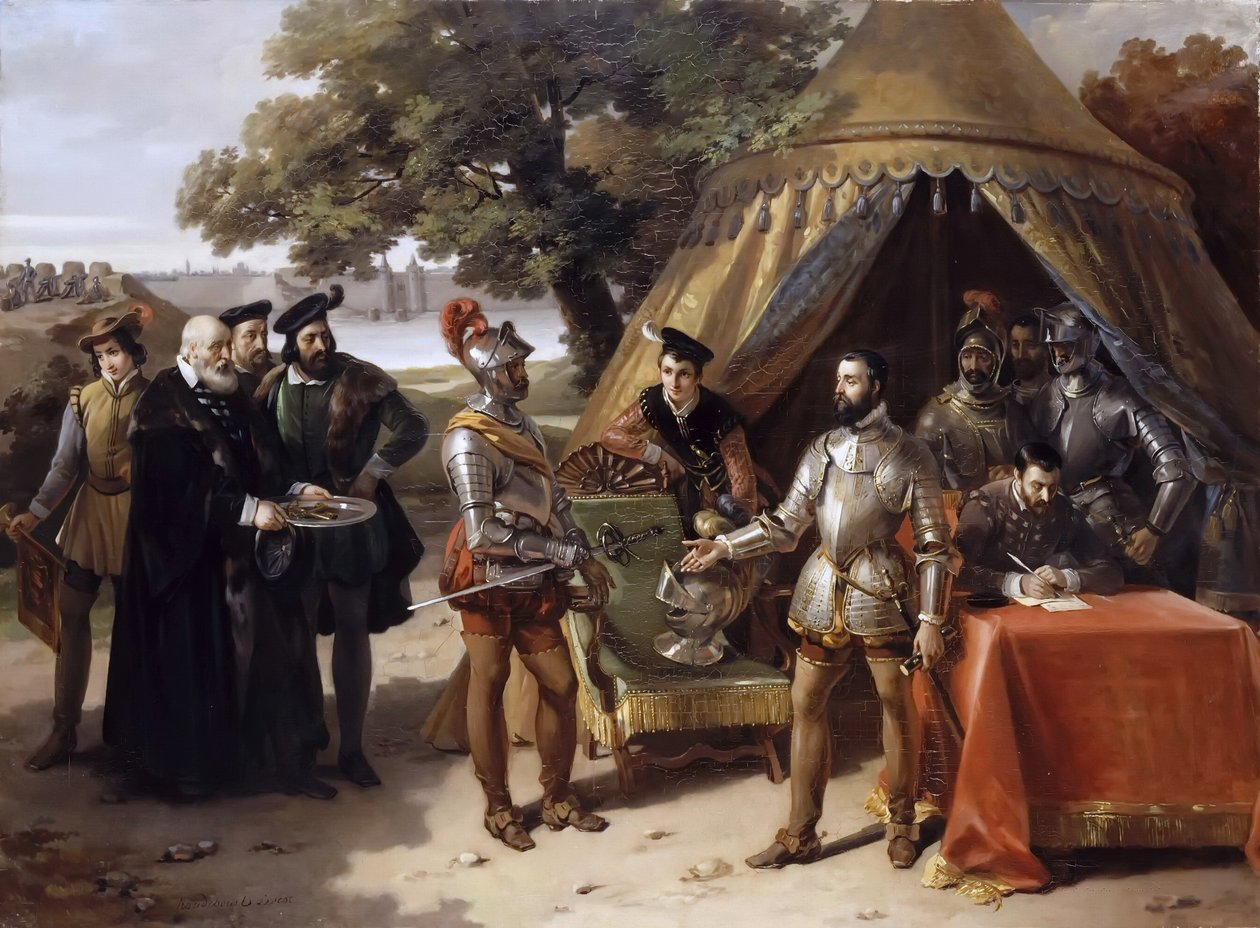
The Capture of Thionville, 23 June 1558, history painting by Hortense Haudebourt-Lescot, 1837

Guise sounded a trumpet to summon a parley with the town's commander Jean Carrebe. He sent an envoy to inform him that if the defenders did not leave the town within three hours, Guise would allow his forces to hang everyone inside, including women and children. Carrebe returned the envoy stating his own terms but Guise refused, stating it was not up to the vanquished to dictate to the victors and firing five or six more shot at the town's houses. Carrebe then surrendered unconditionally and the Spanish soldiers and the town's inhabitants were allowed to leave it, but without full military honours (ie drum, trumpets, standards and no weapons except a sword). They left all their other weapons in the town and the French troops took possession of it on 23 June.

Scépeaux proposed demolishing the town and its fortifications in reprisal for the destruction of Thérouanne in 1553, but Guise vetoed this. The inhabitants had defended it so fiercely that Guise did not allow a single one of them to stay and so the town had to be repopulated by some of the inhabitants of Metz, who bought the houses of Thionville. However, the Peace of Cateau-Cambrésis the following year handed Thionville back to the Spanish, even though they had been in no position to re-capture it in the interim. The French left the town after the treaty and its original inhabitants took back possession of their houses but were unable to revive the town to its pre-war prosperity since it had been badly damaged during its twelve-month French occupation.

== Bibliography ==
- (in French) Barthélemy Aneau, La prise de Thionville sur Moselle
- (in French) Vincent Carloix, Mémoires de la vie de François de Scépeaux, sire de Vieilleville
- (in French) G.F. Teissier, Histoire de Thionville
