= 1573 in Scotland =

- Centuries: 14th; 15th; 16th; 17th; 18th
- Decades: 1550s; 1560s; 1570s; 1580s; 1590s
- See also: List of years in Scotland; Timeline of Scottish history 1573 in: England • Elsewhere

Events from 1573 in the Kingdom of Scotland.

== Incumbents ==
- Monarch – James VI
- Regent Morton

== Events ==
- 1 January – William Kirkcaldy of Grange bombards Edinburgh's markets from the Castle, blowing fish into the air.
- 23 February – The "Pacification of Perth" was a step to ending the Marian Civil War.
- 28 May – Edinburgh Castle surrenders to William Drury.

== Births ==
- Henrietta Stewart
- Jean Guild
- Thomas Hope of Craighall

== Deaths ==
- 30 January – George Hay, 7th Earl of Erroll
- February – William Lauder (poet)
- 9 June – William Maitland of Lethington
- 3 August – William Kirkcaldy of Grange, James Mosman, and James Cockie hanged in Edinburgh.
- 12 September – Archibald Campbell, 5th Earl of Argyll.
- 14 December – James Ormiston hanged in Edinburgh for his part in the murder of Lord Darnley.
