= Jean d'Espinay =

Jean d'Espinay may refer to:

- Jean d'Espinay (bishop) (died 1503), Breton cleric and bishop
- Jean d'Espinay (knight) (1528–1591), French nobleman and soldier
