= 1543 in Scotland =

- Centuries: 14th; 15th; 16th; 17th; 18th
- Decades: 1520s; 1530s; 1540s; 1550s; 1560s
- See also: List of years in Scotland; Timeline of Scottish history 1543 in: England • Elsewhere

Events from 1543 in the Kingdom of Scotland.

== Incumbents ==
- Monarch – Mary, Queen of Scots, and Regent Arran

== Events ==
- 1 July – Regent Arran signs the Treaty of Greenwich (ratified 25 August). The treaty included the marriage of Mary, Queen of Scots, and Prince Edward.
- 24 July – The Secret Bond is made, during controversy over the move of Mary, Queen of Scots, from Linlithgow Palace to Stirling Castle.
- 9 September – Coronation of Mary, Queen of Scots at Stirling.

== Births ==
- James Tyrie

== Deaths ==
- Robert Galbraith (judge)
- William Sutherland, 7th of Duffus
