= 1544 in Scotland =

- Centuries: 14th; 15th; 16th; 17th; 18th
- Decades: 1520s; 1530s; 1540s; 1550s; 1560s
- See also: List of years in Scotland; Timeline of Scottish history 1544 in: England • Elsewhere

Events from 1544 in the Kingdom of Scotland.

== Incumbents ==
- Monarch – Mary, Queen of Scots, and Regent Arran

== Events ==
- 7 May – Burning of Edinburgh, the first action of the Rough Wooing.
- 16 March – Battle of Glasgow (1544)
- 6 July – Lady Margaret Douglas marries Matthew Stewart, 4th Earl of Lennox in London.
- July – Battle of the Shirts in the Great Glen.

== Births ==
- 15 August – Peter Young (tutor), tutor to James VI and I.
- 1 September – John Gordon (bishop, born 1544)

== Deaths ==
- April – Robert Cairncross, Bishop.
