= 1545 in Scotland =

- Centuries: 14th; 15th; 16th; 17th; 18th
- Decades: 1520s; 1530s; 1540s; 1550s; 1560s
- See also: List of years in Scotland; Timeline of Scottish history 1545 in: England • Elsewhere

Events from the year 1545 in the Kingdom of Scotland.

== Incumbents ==
- Monarch – Mary I
- Regent Arran

== Events ==
- 27 February – Battle of Ancrum Moor, a Scottish victory in the war known as the Rough Wooing

== Births ==
- 1 August – Andrew Melville
- Duncan Campbell of Glenorchy

== Deaths ==
- 10 April - William Stewart (bishop of Aberdeen)
- June - Hugh Montgomerie, 1st Earl of Eglinton
- Domhnall Dubh

== See also ==
- Timeline of Scottish history
- 1545 in England
- 1545 in Ireland
