= 1538 in Scotland =

- Centuries: 14th; 15th; 16th; 17th; 18th
- Decades: 1510s; 1520s; 1530s; 1540s; 1550s
- See also: List of years in Scotland; Timeline of Scottish history 1538 in: England • Elsewhere

Events from 1538 in the Kingdom of Scotland.

== Incumbents ==
- Monarch – James V

== Events ==
- 9 May – James V and Mary of Guise are married by proxy at the Château de Châteaudun. The King's proxy Lord Maxwell gave the bride a diamond ring.
- 16 November – Mary of Guise makes her royal entry to Edinburgh on St Margaret's Day.

== Births ==
- Alexander Arbuthnot (poet)
- James Lawson (minister)

== Deaths ==
- Isabella Hoppringle, Prioress of Coldstream
- James Hay (bishop)
