= Jean d'Espinay (knight) =

French nobleman and soldier

Jean II d'Espinay (1528, Champeaux - 9 December 1591) was a French nobleman and soldier. He was count of Durtal (Duretal) and a knight of the Order of St Michael. He served five kings of France – Henry II, Francis II, Charles IX, Henry III and Henry IV.

== Family ==
He was born to Guy III d'Espinay and Louise de Goulaine, whose other children include the poet-bishop Charles d'Espinay. He married Marguerite de Scépeaux, countess of Durtal, daughter of François de Scépeaux, Maréchal de Vieille-Ville.

== Life ==
He studied philosophy, geometry and astrology in Paris before becoming Henry II's chamberlain, then captain of a light cavalry company and seneschal of Albi and Castres. He fought with distinction at the siege of Thionville in 1558 and at the battles of Saint-Denis, Jarnac and Moncontour in the late 1560s. Charles IX made him a knight of the Order of St Michael and Henry III promoted his estates from lordships into a marquisate in 1576.
