= 1565 in Scotland =

- Centuries: 14th; 15th; 16th; 17th; 18th
- Decades: 1540s; 1550s; 1560s; 1570s; 1580s
- See also: List of years in Scotland; Timeline of Scottish history 1565 in: England • Elsewhere

Events from 1565 in the Kingdom of Scotland.

== Incumbents ==
- Monarch – Mary, Queen of Scots

== Events ==
- 29 July – Wedding of Mary, Queen of Scots, and Henry Stuart, Lord Darnley, at Holyrood Palace in Edinburgh.
- August–October – Chaseabout Raid, an attempted rebellion by James Stewart, 1st Earl of Moray, against his half-sister, Mary, Queen of Scots.

== Births ==
- John Spottiswoode
- Elizabeth Stuart, 2nd Countess of Moray
- Henry Wardlaw of Pitreavie

== Deaths ==
- 2 May – Angus MacDonnell
- 5 July – James MacDonald, 6th of Dunnyveg
