= 1550 in Scotland =

- Centuries: 14th; 15th; 16th; 17th; 18th
- Decades: 1530s; 1540s; 1550s; 1560s; 1570s
- See also: List of years in Scotland; Timeline of Scottish history 1550 in: England • Elsewhere

Events from the year 1550 in the Kingdom of Scotland.

== Incumbents ==
- Monarch – Mary I
- Regent Arran

== Events ==
- 24 March – The Treaty of Boulogne ends the hostilities with England known as the Rough Wooing

== Births ==
- 1 February – John Napier, physicist, astronomer and mathematician, discoverer of logarithms (died 1617)

== See also ==
- Timeline of Scottish history
- 1550 in England
- 1550 in Wales
- 1550 in Ireland
