= 1568 in Scotland =

- Centuries: 14th; 15th; 16th; 17th; 18th
- Decades: 1540s; 1550s; 1560s; 1570s; 1580s
- See also: List of years in Scotland; Timeline of Scottish history 1568 in: England • Elsewhere

Events from 1568 in the Kingdom of Scotland.

== Incumbents ==
- Monarch – James VI
- Regent: James Stewart, 1st Earl of Moray

== Events ==
- 2 May – The deposed Mary, Queen of Scots, escapes from Lochleven Castle.
- 13 May – Marian civil war: Battle of Langside – The forces of Mary, Queen of Scots, are defeated by James Stewart, 1st Earl of Moray, her half-brother.
- 16 May – Mary, Queen of Scots, flees across the Solway Firth from Scotland to England but on May 19 is placed in custody in Carlisle Castle on the orders of Queen Elizabeth I of England, her cousin.
- 10 June – Regent Moray musters forces at Biggar for a march on Dumfries.
- 16 June – Kenmure Castle, the home of John Gordon of Lochinvar, is destroyed by Moray's army.
- October – Regent Moray shows Mary's "casket letters" at a conference in York headed by the Duke of Norfolk, and again at Westminster Palace on 7 December

== Arts and literature ==
- Edinburgh merchant George Bannatyne begins compiling the Bannatyne Manuscript while confined to his home due to plague.

== Births ==
- John Row, ecclesiastical historian and Reformer (died 1646)
- William Couper (bishop)
- Approximate date – John Welsh of Ayr, Presbyterian leader (died 1622 in England)

== Deaths ==
- 6 June – Kenneth Mackenzie, 10th of Kintail
- William Baillie of Lamington, landowner
