= 1542 in Scotland =

- Centuries: 14th; 15th; 16th; 17th; 18th
- Decades: 1520s; 1530s; 1540s; 1550s; 1560s
- See also: List of years in Scotland; Timeline of Scottish history 1542 in: England • Elsewhere

Events from 1542 in the Kingdom of Scotland.

== Incumbents ==
- Monarch – James V and Mary, Queen of Scots

== Events ==
- 24 August 1542 – A Scottish army led by George Gordon, 4th Earl of Huntly defeated English border raiders at the battle of Haddon Rig.
- 22 – 26 October – The Duke of Norfolk leads a raid to Kelso and Scottish forces fail to engage.
- 24 November 1542 – A Scottish army led by Oliver Sinclair is defeated in England at the Battle of Solway Moss.

== Births ==
- Mary Fleming
- John Forbes, 8th Lord Forbes
- Mary Seton
- 8 December 1542 - Mary, Queen of Scots at Linlithgow Palace

== Deaths ==
- William Borthwick, 4th Lord Borthwick
- 27 November 1542 - David Lindsay, 8th Earl of Crawford
- 14 December 1542 - James V at Falkland Palace.
