= François de Scépeaux =

French Marshal and Diplomat

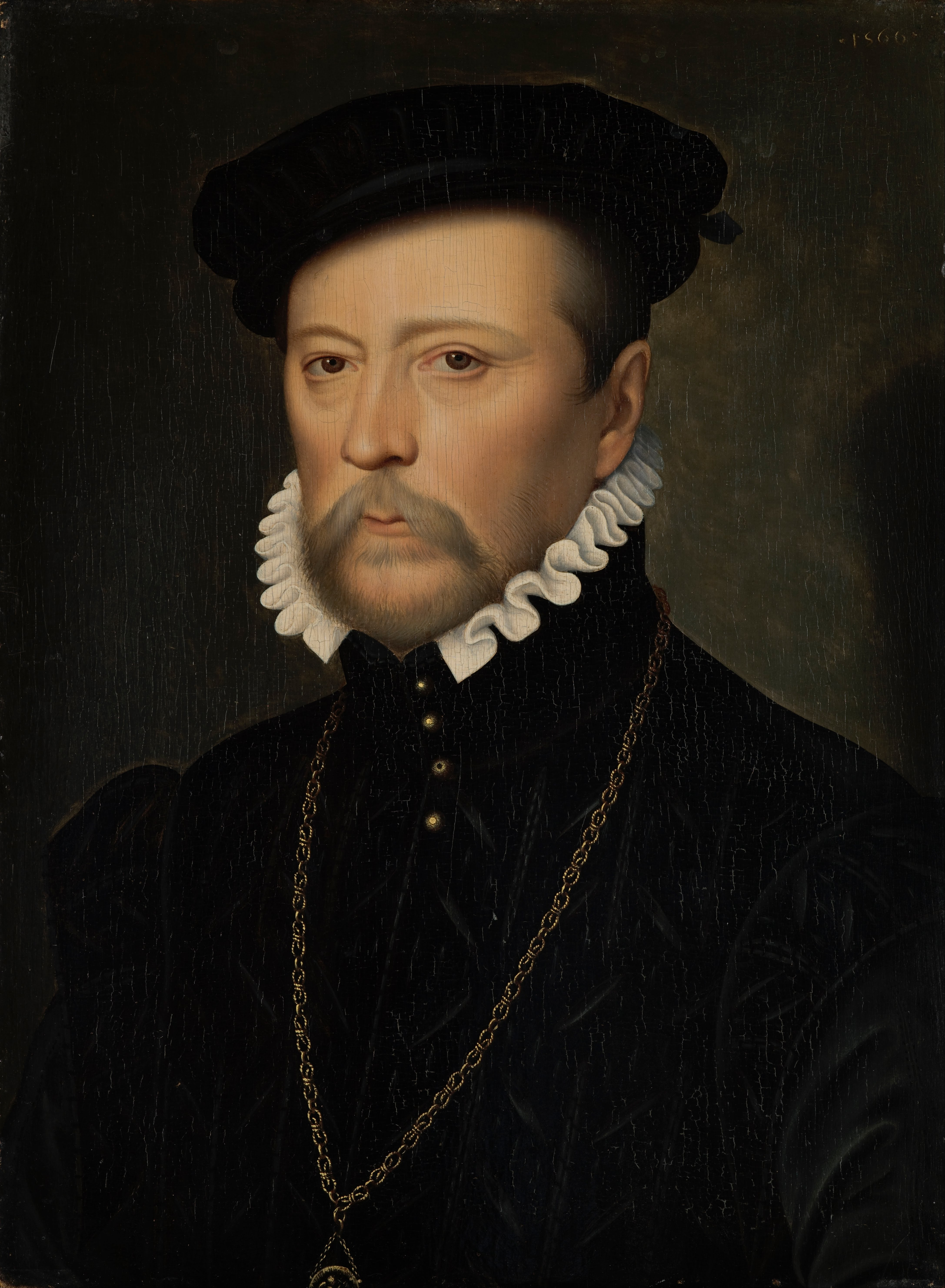
- François de Scépeaux by François Clouet, 1557; Musée des Beaux-Arts de Besançon.
- Born: 1509
- Died: November 30, 1571 (aged 61 or 62); Château de Durtal
- Relatives: Husband of Renée Le Roux de la Roche des Aubiers (1532)
- Military career
- Allegiance: Kingdom of France
- Service years: 1525–1564
- Rank: Marshal of France (1562)
- Nickname: Maréchal de la Vielleville
- Commands: Governor of the 3 bishoprics (1553)
- Conflicts: Italian Wars - Pavia, Melfi, naval battle of Naples (1528), Cérisoles (1544); French Wars of Religion - sieges of Perpignan (1541), Saint-Dizier, Landrecies, Hesdin and Thérouanne, siege of Boulogne (1549), capture of Le Havre (1563)

François de Scépeaux de Vieilleville (1509 – 30 November 1571), lord of Vieilleville, 1st comte of Durtal, was a French governor, diplomat, ambassador, conseillé du roi and marshal. During his career, he would serve four French kings. He fought throughout the later years of the Italian Wars, acquiring for himself the key frontier governorship of Metz in 1553. Under King Charles IX he would be elevated to marshal and would serve the crown in the early religious wars, increasingly in the role of peacemaker and diplomat, though with scattered military service as with the recapture of Le Havre in 1563. He died in 1571, shortly before France would be shaken by the St Bartholomew's Day Massacre.

== Early life and family ==
François de Scépaux de Vielleville, was born in 1509 to his father seigneur René de Scépeaux de Vieilleville and mother Marguerite de La Jaille. He was eldest to his sister named Françoise, and grandson of his namesake François de Scépeaux, chamberlain of King Charles VIII.

In his youth he served as page d'honneur to Louise of Savoy, mother of King Francis I.

Vielleville married Renée Le Roux de la Roche des Aubiers (daughter of lord Jean Le Roux de Chemans) in 1532, and together they had two daughters. Their first daughter was Marguerite, countess of Durtal and baroness of Matheselon (-1603), who would later marry Marquess Jean d'Espinay. Their second daughter Jeanne, would marry lord Olric de Deuilly. He eventually had a nephew named Jean de Thévalle. One of the matches selected for his daughters was a Protestant gentleman, and Vielleville was widely suspected of sympathies towards the religion.

== Reign of Francis I ==
Vielleville had his first military engagement at the Battle of Pavia on 24 February 1525. He participated in the Siege of Melfi in 1528, and distinguished himself in the Battle of Capo d'Orso, a naval battle fought on the outskirts of Naples. In 1536, he became attached to the house of the Duke of Orleans, who would later become King Henry II. Both he and Jacques d'Albon de Saint-André would be close confidants of the young Duke, reinforcing his hatred of his brother Charles. Vielleville was later sent to Italy to monitor the state of affairs of Marshal de Montjean in 1538.

He served at the Siege of Perpignan, where he was inducted into Knighthood in 1541. Vielleville also took part in the various sieges of Saint-Dizier, Landrecies, Hesdin, and Thérouanne.

Vielleville fought at the Battle of Ceresole on 11 April 1544. He was then sent to England to prevent a rupture which broke out on his return from 23 May to 1 June 1545. He later returned from England to participate in the Siege of Boulogne-sur-Mer in 1546.

== Reign of Henri II ==
=== New regime ===
With Anne de Montmorency restored to favor after the death of Francis, he organized the efforts to suppress the revolt of the Pétaults which had spread in 1548. Vielleville was tasked by Montmorency with bringing the town of Saintes back into line with the crown.

=== Promotion ===
In 1550, he was a lieutenant in the company of the marshal of France Jacques d'Albon de Saint-André, which was to further his career. From 31 May to 2 June 1551, he was received by Henry II at his Durtal Castle.

Vielleville was called to the king's council of Henri II in 1552.

=== Metz ===
While on the council, he suggested putting an end to the invasions of Charles V's armies by seizing the three bishoprics of Metz, Toul, and Verdun. "The emperor is waging war against you underhand, he said to the king, it should be declared openly. So take these cities, since he is offering you the opportunity." Having occupied Metz, Vielleville was asked by the king to assume the governorship of the town. Vielleville cautioned against this move, arguing that if they wished to gain the defections of more towns in Alsace peacefully, it would be best to leave the current council in charge. Montmorency dissuaded the king from either course of action, and instead to appoint Artus de Cossé-Brissac as governor. A year later, after the embarrassment at sack of Thérouanne had partially discredited Montmorency in the eyes of the king, Guise was successful in pushing for his client, Vielleville, to assume the governorship of Metz, replacing Cossé. Under his administration the bishoprics became Protestant havens.

Alongside this office, the king suggested for him the role of lieutenant-general of Brittany, in a letter to the king, he took great offense to the offer, explaining that he was not geriatric, and still had much vigor left with which to serve the king. He would go on to introduce Henri II to Ambroise Paré and later assisted in the capture of Pont-à-Mousson and Thionville in 1558. With the Guise ascendant in early 1559, Vielleville aligned himself with them against his enemy, Montmorency. Alongside most of Henri's Marshals, he strongly denounced the terms of the Peace of Cateau-Cambrésis, directly to the king's face according to his memoirs. From 1559-60 he was absent from his responsibilities in Metz, leaving them in the hands of his lieutenant-general Senecterre, who, in his absence initiated a persecution of the bishoprics' Protestant populations.

== Reign of Charles IX ==
=== Prelude to war ===
Catherine, now regent for her son, was concerned about the possibility of Ferdinand II, Holy Roman Emperor using the chaos that had consumed France in the last year to seize back the three bishoprics. To this end she wrote to Vielleville, urging him not to let those who might betray the towns into the hands of the enemy inside the walls.

=== First civil war ===
The king gave him the title of Marshal on 27 December 1562, replacing his predecessor, the Marshal of Saint-André, who had been killed on the field at Dreux. From January he was besieging Warwick in Le Havre. While he would not successfully bring the siege to a conclusion during the civil war under the orders of Constable Montmorency, he participated in the recapture of Le Havre from the English in July 1563, along with Marshals Brissac, Bourdillon and Montmorency.

=== Enforcing Amboise ===
With the civil war concluded the Edict of Amboise with which it was sealed required enforcing. To this end commissioners were sent out to the various regions of France, to tackle local disputes over the terms of the edict, and where necessary enforce compromises on the population at their own discretion. To ensure that these commissioners had the necessary muscle to have their word be taken as law, France was divided into three zones between Marshals Montmorency, Bourdillon, and Vielleville. Vielleville was responsible for the Lyonnais, Dauphiné, Provence and Languedoc, beginning his work in the major city of Lyon which had been a Huguenot stronghold during the civil war. His responsibilities would further expand into Poitou and the Pays Messin subsequently. When populations felt their commissioners were failing to produce justice, they would appeal to the Marshals, or the King, asking them to intervene, as happened with the Huguenot nobility of Maine to Vielleville. When he was finished in the town of Lyon he was replaced there by Jean de Losse. Vielleville excelled in the domestic role of peace broker, and would continue to perform the role during later peace edicts.

=== Diplomatic mission ===
In October 1564, the king created the County of Durtal installing Vielleville as count. He was sent on a diplomatic expedition with Bellièvre and the bishop of Limoges to Switzerland to promise payment for debts incurred to the cantons during the wars of Henri II. The delegation was a great success, and the prospect of an alliance between was floated, after some wrangling with the cantons, the terms were agreed to on 7 December 1564. The French debts to Switzerland remained an issue as France struggled to pay.

During this period he increasingly aligned with Catherine, in her opposition to the more hard-line faction at court centered on Charles, Cardinal of Lorraine.

=== Second civil war ===
With Alva due to march north to crush a rebellion in the Spanish Netherlands the court of France was thrown into alarm at the prospect of this army being turned upon the kingdom. To this end Vielleville was instructed to go back to his crucial post in the frontier city of Metz, to ensure the bishoprics would be ready to meet any challenge from Spain. The Huguenot nobility was also alarmed, seeing in Alva's movements a plot to destroy them in league with the extremists at court, thus entering into a plan to capture the king at Meaux and execute Charles, Cardinal of Lorraine.

Despite having failed to capture the king during the Surprise of Meaux Condé was ill-disposed to cut his losses, and set about sieging the king in Paris in the hope of securing a victory before the crown could mobilize. L'Hôpital and Vielleville were sent out to negotiate with him at Saint-Denis. They were met with a tirade against the Guise, and demands for all Italian financiers to be expelled, all taxes since Louis XI to be revoked and an Estates General to be called.

With the second civil war concluded in 1568, Vielleville was among those pressuring the young king to demonstrate his commitment to the Peace of Longjumeau, through the enforcement of both the Catholic and Protestant populations of France. He reported glumly on the situation in Anjou, France, noting that there was no effort to abide by the terms of the recent peace. Alongside the other more politique marshals at court, he was alarmed by the growing influence of Lorraine and his proximity to the king's brother Anjou, who was looking to become Lieutenant-General of the kingdom. Vielleville, Damville, and Montmorency met in Catherine's chambers to plot strategy. When civil war resumed in September 1568, the three Marshals would not serve alongside the young Anjou, who turned instead to Marshal Tavannes to guide him.

== Death and legacy ==
On 30 November 1571, Vielleville received the king at his Château de Durtal He died during this royal visit, allegedly poisoned by "wicked people who were jealous of the good face and friendship the king had for him".

François is remembered as the marshal of Vielleville and in novels as a man of many feats. He is also the dedicatee of Cinquième livre de Pseaumes de David mis en musique à quatre parties en forme de motets by Claude Goudimel, and of Pseaumes de David, mis en rime françoise par Clément Marot & Théodore de Bèze, nouvellement mis en musique à quatre parties par Claude Goudimel.

== See also ==
Bibliographies:

- AbbéAngot, t. III, p. 699-700 ; t. IV, p. 868.
- Brantôme, Vie des hommes illustres et grands capitaines français de son temps, Leyde, Sambix le Jeune, 1665, 2 vol. in-16°.
- Mémoires de la vie de François de Scépeaux, sire de Vieilleville et Comte de Duretal, Maréchal de France; Contenants plusieurs Anecdotes des Regnes de François I, Henri II, François II, et Charles IX, composés par Vincent Carlois, son secrétaire. Paris : H.L. Guerin, L.F. Delatour, 1757. 5 tomes in-8°. [These "Memoirs" contain many affabulations and are considered unreliable. Their attribution to Carlois is questioned and their writing dates from the XVIII].
- C. Coignet, Un gentilhomme des temps passés François de Scépeaux, sire de Vieilleville, 1509-1571, portraits et récits du seizième siècle, règne de Henri II. Paris, E. Plon, Nourrit et Cie, 1886, in-8°. [This work is especially rich in anecdotes and pictorial scenes].
- Jérémie Foa, La pacification de la paix la mission du maréchal de Vieilleville à Clermont en Auvergne (1570), Bulletin de la Société d’Histoire du Protestantisme Français 151/2 (2005), p. 231-264.
- François Lesure et Geneviève Thibault, Bibliographie des éditions d'Adrian Le Roy et Robert Ballard (1551-1598). Paris : 1955. Supplément in Revue de Musicologie 40 (1957) p. 166-172.
- Abbé Ch. Marchand, Le Maréchal François de Scépeaux de Vieilleville et ses Mémoires. Paris, Alph. Picard et Fils, 1893, in-8°. [This work cites a number of historical sources and discredits Mémoires by Carlois as well as the work of Coignet. See the account of it in Revue historique 48/1 (1892), p. 215-216].

== Sources ==
- Baird, Henry (1880). History of the Rise of the Huguenots: Vol 2 of 2. Hodder & Stoughton.
- Baumgartner, Frederic (1988). Henry II: King of France 1547-1559. Duke University Press.
- Harding, Robert (1978). Anatomy of a Power Elite: the Provincial Governors in Early Modern France. Yale University Press.
- Roberts, Penny (2013). Peace and Authority during the French Religious Wars c.1560-1600. Palgrave Macmillan.
- Romier, Lucien (1913). Les Origines Politiques des Guerres de Religion II: La Fin de la Magnificience Extėrieure le Roi Contre les Protestants (1555-1559). Librairie Académique Perrin et Cie.
- Le Roux, Nicolas (2001). La faveur du Roi (in French). Seyssel: Éditions Champ Vallon. ISBN 2-87673-311-0.
- Salmon, J.H.M (1975). Society in Crisis: France during the Sixteenth Century. Metheun & Co.
- Sutherland, Nicola (1980). The Huguenot Struggle for Recognition. Yale University Press.
- Thompson, James (1909). The Wars of Religion in France 1559-1576: The Huguenots, Catherine de Medici and Philip II. Chicago University Press.
