= 1567 in Scotland =

- Centuries: 14th; 15th; 16th; 17th; 18th
- Decades: 1540s; 1550s; 1560s; 1570s; 1580s
- See also: List of years in Scotland; Timeline of Scottish history 1567 in: England • Elsewhere

Events from 1567 in the Kingdom of Scotland.

== Incumbents ==
- Monarch – Mary, Queen of Scots and James VI
- Regent: James Stewart, 1st Earl of Moray

== Events ==
- 10 February – Murder of Lord Darnley, the husband of Mary, Queen of Scots, at the Kirk o' Field in Edinburgh by gunpowder explosion.
- 12 April – James Hepburn, 4th Earl of Bothwell, is acquitted on charges of murder in the killing of Lord Darnley. Upon acquittal he makes plans to become Mary's new husband.
- 20 April – Ainslie Tavern Bond signed in support of the Earl of Bothwell.
- 24 April – Bothwell takes Mary as a prisoner to Dunbar Castle after preventing her from travelling from Stirling Castle to Edinburgh, then rapes her.
- 15 May – Mary, Queen of Scots, marries the Earl of Bothwell, at Holyrood Palace.
- 15 June – Battle of Carberry Hill: Mary is defeated by Scottish nobles and imprisoned in Lochleven Castle.
- 24 July – Abdication of Mary, Queen of Scots (at Lochleven Castle), in favour of her 1-year-old son James VI.
- 29 July – Coronation of James VI at Stirling, Church of the Holy Rude.
- 12 December – The Scottish Parliament votes to approve the Accession and Coronation Act 1567 (Act Anent the demission of the Crown in favour of our Sovereign Lord, and his Majesty's Coronation), confirming the abdication of Mary Queen of Scots in favor of her son James VI and his coronation as the legal ruler of Scotland. Mary's half brother, James Stewart, 1st Earl of Moray, is appointed as the regent to rule on behalf of the King (as Moray is absent from Scotland at this time, the Parliament appoints a committee of seven deputy regents to rule on his behalf).

== Births ==
- William Stewart of Grandtully

== Deaths ==
- 10 February - Henry Stuart, Lord Darnley
- 23 June - John Gordon, 11th Earl of Sutherland
- May - Robert Beaton of Creich
