= 1546 in Scotland =

- Centuries: 14th; 15th; 16th; 17th; 18th
- Decades: 1520s; 1530s; 1540s; 1550s; 1560s
- See also: List of years in Scotland; Timeline of Scottish history 1546 in: England • Elsewhere

Events from the year 1546 in the Kingdom of Scotland.

== Incumbents ==
- Monarch – Mary I
- Regent Arran

== Events ==
- 1 March – Scottish Protestant reformer George Wishart, arrested on 19 January, is burned at the stake at St Andrews on orders of Cardinal David Beaton of the Roman Catholic church, after being found guilty of heresy. Cardinal Beaton is assassinated less than three months later.
- 29 May – David Beaton, the Roman Catholic Archbishop of St Andrews and the only Scottish cardinal, is assassinated at St Andrews Castle by William Kirkcaldy and Norman Leslie in retaliation for the 28 March execution of Wishart.
- 8 July – The Earl of Arran, Regent of Scotland for Mary, Queen of Scots, recaptures Dumbarton Castle from England after a 20-day siege.
- 14 August – The Scottish Parliament ratifies the Treaty of Ardres.
- October – Siege of St Andrews Castle: the Regent Arran lays siege to the "Catilians", a group of Protestants who have been holding the castle since their 29 May assassination of Cardinal Beaton there.
- 18 December – Siege of St Andrews Castle: A truce is agreed to between the Kingdom of Scotland (led by the Regent Arran) and the "Catilians". With England's king Henry VIII threatening an invasion to protect the Castilians, the parties agree that no action will be taken until the Pope can consider whether to absolve the Protestants of murder, and that if the Pope grants the absolution, the Protestants will be allowed to surrender on good terms.

== Births ==
- Jean Gordon, Countess of Bothwell, noblewoman (died 1629)
- Henry Stuart, Lord Darnley, king consort (assassinated 1567)

== Deaths ==
- 1 March – George Wishart, religious reformer (executeded) (born 1513)
- 29 May – David Beaton, cardinal (assassinated) (born c. 1494)
- 9 July – Robert Maxwell, 5th Lord Maxwell, statesman (born c. 1493)

== See also ==
- Timeline of Scottish history
- 1546 in England
- 1546 in Ireland
