= 1620s in Scotland =

== Incumbents ==
Monarch of Scotland

- James I of England/VI of Scotland (1567–1625) (as King of Scotland)
- Charles I of England and Scotland (1625–1649), Duke of Rothesay, Prince and Great Steward of Scotland, etc.
- Charles Stuart, Prince of Wales (1612–1625) (ascended to throne)
- Charles James Stuart (1629)

=== 1620 ===
Gradual decline of witch hunts due to scepticism and aftermath of 1597 Great Scottish witch hunt.

=== 1621 ===
- King James VI and I grants William Alexander of Scotland a royal charter to colonize Acadia, a region that includes part of modern-day Southeastern Canada and the U.S. state of Maine, in an effort to establish a Scottish colonial empire in the New World.
- The Parliament of Scotland ratifies the Five Articles of Perth, which are meant to integrate the Church in Scotland with the Anglican Church. This unpopular move by King James will eventually lead to the rise of the Covenanters in Scotland.
- In February 1621, the Kirkcaldy kirk session (the local church court) recorded that Alison Dick was formally accused of witchcraft and brought before the session.

=== 1622 ===
- June 16 – Scottish Lord Chancellor Alexander Seton, 1st Earl of Dunfermline dies. During the earlier months prior to his death, he has been in the process of making alterations to Fyvie Castle and the Pinkie House, which become famous modern-day landmarks in Scotland.

=== 1623 ===
- Clan MacDonald kills rival Clan chief Malcolm MacFie, and occupy clan MacFie's Argyll islands. As a result, Clan MacFie is considered "disbanded" from 1623 until 1981.

=== 1624 ===
- May 25 – The town of Dunfermline is destroyed by a fire.
- Death in Edinburgh of Huguenot calligrapher Esther Inglis.

=== 1625 ===
- March 27 – Charles I succeeds to the thrones of England (with Wales) and Scotland.
- June 13 – Charles I marries Princess Henrietta Maria of France.

=== 1626 ===
- July 5 – Battle of Stralsund occurs in which Holy Roman Commander Albrecht von Wallenstein is defeated by a joint Swedo-Danish force with Scottish assistance which eventually leads to the siege against Stralsund being lifted on August 4.
- William Alexander is appointed Secretary for Scotland, an office he will hold until his death in 1640.

=== 1627 ===
- Reconstruction of Muchalls Castle in Aberdeenshire completed by Thomas Burnett.

=== 1628 ===
- George Heriot's School is established as Heriot's Hospital in Edinburgh.

=== 1629 ===
- William Alexander, 1st Earl of Stirling briefly establishes a Scottish colony at Port Royal, Nova Scotia.
- February 26 – Birth in Dalkeith of Archibald Campbell, 9th Earl of Argyll (executed 1685).

== Births ==
=== 1620 ===
- January 1 – Robert Morison, botanist and taxonomist (died 1683)
- James Dundas, Lord Arniston, politician and judge (died 1679)

== Deaths ==
=== 1626 ===
- James Sempill, courtier and poet (born 1566)

== See also ==
- Timeline of Scottish history
- List of years in Scotland
