= 1566 in Scotland =

- Centuries: 14th; 15th; 16th; 17th; 18th
- Decades: 1540s; 1550s; 1560s; 1570s; 1580s
- See also: List of years in Scotland; Timeline of Scottish history 1566 in: England • Elsewhere

Events from 1566 in the Kingdom of Scotland.

== Incumbents ==
- Monarch – Mary, Queen of Scots

== Events ==
- 24 February – Wedding of Jean Gordon and James Hepburn, 4th Earl of Bothwell.
- 9 March – David Rizzio is murdered in front of Mary, Queen of Scots at Holyrood Palace in Edinburgh by a group of nobles led by Patrick Ruthven, 3rd Lord Ruthven with the support of Mary's husband Henry Stuart, Lord Darnley.
- 11 March – Mary escapes to Dunbar Castle after convincing Lord Darnley to help her.
- 18 March – Mary returns to Edinburgh with an army raised by James Hepburn, 4th Earl of Bothwell.
- 3 April – Thomas Scott of Cambusmichael is executed for his part in the murder of David Rizzio using Edinburgh's Maiden (guillotine).
- April – Mary takes up residence at Edinburgh Castle in preparation to give birth.
- 19 June – Mary gives birth to her son James at Edinburgh Castle.
- 15 November – Mary, Queen of Scots visits Halidon Hill in England with John Forster, Marshal of Berwick.
- 17 December – James is baptised at Stirling Castle.

== Births ==
- Thomas Erskine, 1st Earl of Kellie
- John Stewart, 1st Earl of Atholl (1566–1603)
- 19 June – James VI and I, King of Scotland from 1567 and King of England and Ireland from 1603 (died 1625 in England)
- James Sempill, courtier and poet (died 1626)

== Deaths ==
- Robert Carnegie, Lord Kinnaird
- 9 March – David Rizzio, Italian courtier (born 1533 in the Duchy of Savoy)
- 26 March – Laurence Oliphant, 3rd Lord Oliphant
- 13 June – Patrick Ruthven, 3rd Lord Ruthven
