= Charles d'Espinay =

French cleric, bishop and poet

Charles d'Espinay (c. 1531, château d'Espinay - September 1591, Epiniac) was a French cleric, bishop and poet. He is most notable for his sonnets, particularly his erotic "Sonnets amoureux" published in 1559-1560 - he was a contemporary and disciple of Pierre de Ronsard.

== Family ==
He was the younger son of Guy III d'Espinay († 1551) and his wife Louise de Goulaine. His elder brother Jean II († 1591) became a marquis in 1575 and continued the family line. They also had other siblings - Philippine, who became abbess of abbaye Saint-Georges de Rennes (1572-1583), and Louis d'Espinay († 1600), commendatory to abbaye Notre-Dame du Tronchet (1558-1567) before marrying and becoming lord of Yvigniac. Louis' son Jean d’Espinay became abbot commendatory to the abbaye de Saint-Méen (1592-1604).

== Life ==
He initially became a prior of Saint-Exupère in Gahard and of Saint-Jacques de Bécherel and abbot commendatory to the abbaye Saint-Gildas-des-Bois. He took the oath of allegiance for his three ecclesiastical benefices in November 1558, aged 27. He was next made commendatory of abbaye Notre-Dame du Tronchet. On 29 May 1560 he was made bishop of Dol and as such he took part in the Council of Trent in December 1562, at which he was entrusted with several negotiations. He took the oath of allegiance to his bishop and was consecrated on 16 September 1565, entering the canonical chapter in February 1566. In 1586 he was granted the commendatory of abbaye Notre-Dame du Tronchet.

During the Catholic League, he was a faithful supporter of Philippe Emmanuel, Duke of Mercœur and attended an assembly in 1589 with Aymar Hennequin bishop of Rennes, at which he entitled him "protector of the Catholic religion in Brittany". After his brother Antoine's death fighting for the League on 7 January 1591, Charles himself took over the defence of Dol. Charles wrote his will on 10 August 1591 and died the following 12 September. He was buried in Dol Cathedral on 22 September.

== Bibliography ==
- (in French) Data.Bnf Charles d'Espinay
