= 1537 in Scotland =

- Centuries: 14th; 15th; 16th; 17th; 18th
- Decades: 1510s; 1520s; 1530s; 1540s; 1550s
- See also: List of years in Scotland; Timeline of Scottish history 1537 in: England • Elsewhere

Events from 1537 in the Kingdom of Scotland.

== Incumbents ==
- Monarch – James V

== Events ==
- 1 January – James V and Madeleine of Valois are married at Notre-Dame de Paris.
- 19 May – James V and Madeleine of Valois arrive at Leith.

== Births ==
- March – Patrick Adamson
- Alan Cathcart, 4th Lord Cathcart
- John Maitland, 1st Lord Maitland of Thirlestane

== Deaths ==
- 7 July – Madeleine of Valois, queen consort of James V, dies at Holyrood Palace.
- 14 July – John, Master of Forbes (a son of Lord Forbes) executed.
- 17 July – Janet Douglas, Lady Glamis, executed at Edinburgh's Castlehill.
- 21 December – Alexander Stewart (bishop of Moray)
- Lady Catherine Gordon, widow of Perkin Warbeck.
