= Johann Faber of Heilbronn =

Catholic preacher and author (1504–1558)

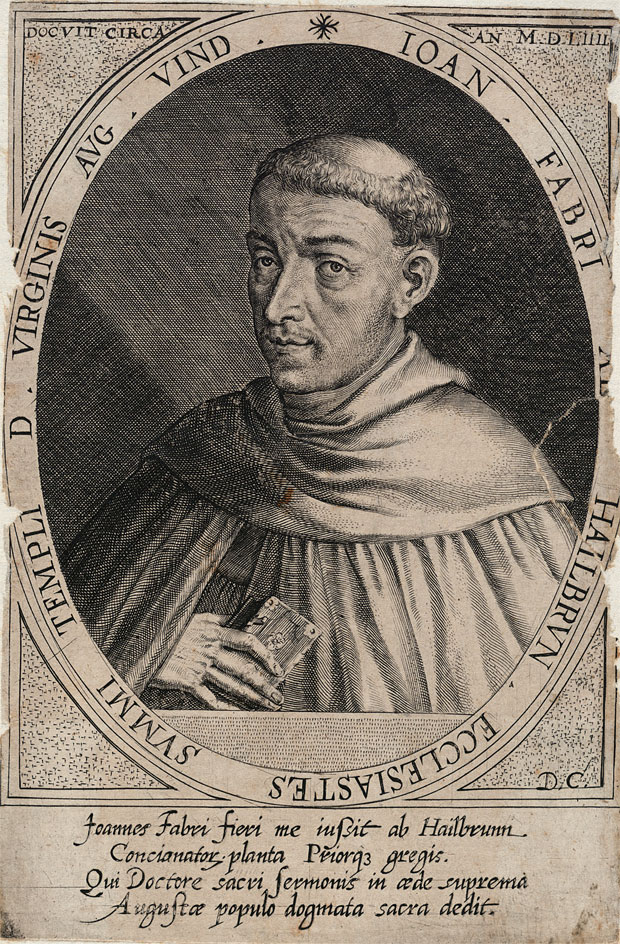
Johannes Fabri, 16th century engraving

Johann Faber of Heilbronn, also known as Johannes Fabri (1504 – 27 February 1558), was a controversial 16th century Catholic preacher.

== Biography ==
Faber was born in Heilbronn. At the age of sixteen he entered the Dominican Order and made his ecclesiastical studies in the convent at Wimpfen. Little is known about his early preaching, but in 1534 he was invited to preach in the cathedral of Augsburg, but owing to the Lutheran tendencies of the time, and the strong anti-Catholic feeling which arose from it, the Catholic clergy were forbidden to preach, and his usefulness in Augsburg was of short duration.

He then went to the University of Cologne, where he devoted himself for several years to the higher clerical studies. Here he published in 1535 and 1536 several unedited works of the English mystic, Richard Rolle. Returning to Wimpfen, he engaged in the work of preaching and, as a Catholic, refuting the supposed errors of the Reformers, which had grown greatly in popularity since his departure.

His zeal in upholding the tenets of Catholicism, and his increasing success as preacher, caused his enemies to turn against him with such bitterness that he was forced to leave the city. In 1539, at the invitation of the citizens of Colmar, he proceeded to that city, where Lutheranism had by this time become extremely popular. On 2 September of the same year he enrolled at the University of Freiburg as "Concionator Colmarensis", and it was at this time that he most likely received his baccalaureate. In 1545 he was elected prior of the convent in Sélestat, but he had served only two years in this capacity when he was again appointed to take charge of the pulpit in the cathedral of Augsburg. Being forced to abandon it once more in 1552, he proceeded to the University of Ingolstadt, where he received the degree of Doctor of Theology under the presidency of Peter Canisius, who succeeded him later in the pulpit of Augsburg. In the following year he returned again to Augsburg, where he died.

== Works ==
Faber engaged in controversy with many Lutherans and church leaders. He was the author of a number of works, including the following:

- Quod fides esse possit sine caritate, expositio pia et catholica (Augsburg, 1548)
- Testimonium Scripturae et Patrum B. Petrum apostolum Romae fuisse (Antwerp, 1553)
- Grundliche und christliche Anzeigungen aus der heiligen Schrift und heiligen Kirchenlehrern was die evangelische Messe sei (Dillingen, 1558)
- Enchiridion Bibliorum concionatori in popularibus declamationibus utile (Cologne, 1568)
- Precationes Christianae ex sacris litteris et D. Augustino singulario studio concinnatae et selectae (Cologne, 1586)
