= John Macalpine =

John Macalpine (Latin: Maccabeus) (died 6 December 1557) was a Scottish Protestant theologian.

== Life ==
He was born in Scotland about the beginning of the 16th century, and graduated at a Scottish university. From 1532 to 1534 he was prior of the Dominican convent of Perth; but having in the latter year been summoned with Alexander Ales and others to answer for heresy before the Bishop of Ross, he left for England. There he was granted letters of denization on 7 April 1537, and married Agnes Macheson, a fellow exile for religion; her sister Elizabeth became the wife of Miles Coverdale.

The reaction of 1539 made England doubtful refuge and on 25 November 1540 MacAlpine matriculated at the university of Wittenberg. He had already graduated BA at Cologne, and in 1542 proceeded to his doctorate at Wittenberg. That year, being known as Maccabeus, he accepted Christian III of Denmark's offer to the chair of theology at the university of Copenhagen, which had been endowed out of the spoils of the Church.

Melanchthon spoke well of Macalpine and with Peter Plade (Palladius) who had studied at Wittenberg, Macalpine took a prominent part in building up the Lutheran Church of Denmark. He encouraged Sir David Lindsay who visited him in 1548, to publish his Monarchie; and persuaded Christian III to intercede with Mary I of England on behalf of Coverdale and invite him to Denmark.

MacAlpine died at Copenhagen on 6 December 1557. His son Christian Maccabeus Macalpine (1541–1598) studied at Wittenberg, Copenhagen and Cambridge, and was professor at the university of Copenhagen 1565–1567.

== Works ==
A joint exposure of Plade and MacAlpine on Osiander's errors was published in 1552 and reprinted in Leipzig and Copenhagen in 1768. MacAlpine was one of the four translators of Luther's German Bible into Danish.
