= Euphemia Leslie =

Scottish prioress

Euphemia Leslie (1508–1570) was a Scottish prioress. She was the prioress of Elcho Priory at Perth in 1526–1570.

== Life ==
She was the illegitimate offspring of the Catholic priest Walter Leslie and was given papal dispensation to become the prioress of Elcho in 1526, despite her birth, age and the fact that Elcho already had a prioress called Elizabeth Swinton. In 1527 Leslie conquered Elcho with an army supported by her brother and hundreds of supporters. In 1560, the Scottish reformation was introduced. In her will, she arranged for the retirement funds for her remaining nuns. This is the earliest preserved will of a Scottish prioress.
