= Elcho Priory =

Priory in Perth and Kinross, Scotland

Coordinates: 56.3803°N 3.3920°W

Elcho Priory was a medieval Cistercian priory in Perthshire, Scotland, dedicated to the Virgin Mary.

== Location ==
Elcho Priory was located in the parish of Rhynd, about three miles southeast of Perth on the south bank of the River Tay. It was the only Cistercian convent in Scotland north of the Firth of Forth. It was a mile west of Elcho Castle. In addition to its own land, the priory rented nearby lands, one being part of the Hill of Coates, which was behind the nunnery. The nunnery church stood on the north side of the site, aligned east-west with entrance on the west. It originally measured 7 m. wide x 15 m. long but was expanded in a second phase of building to 8 m. x 21 m. The priory was located in the western portion of the barony of Elcho, which, with Elcho Castle, was held by the Wemyss family. Before the Reformation, the reciprocal relationship between the two was that the laird of Wemyss would provide protection for the nuns during periods of English invasion, and, in return, the priory leased certain of its lands to him.

== Founding ==
Scottish historian Ian B. Cowan once said of Elcho, “The history of the nunnery is obscure.” It is said to have been founded “before 1241” by David Lindsay of Glenesk (ancestor of the earls of Crawford) and his mother, Mary Abernethy, daughter of Alexander Abernethy of that Ilk, who held lands at Elcho during the reign of Robert the Bruce. Alternatively, the mother of David Lindsay has been identified as Alice or Aleonora de Limesay or de Limési, daughter of Gerard de Limesay or de Limési. But this is speculation. The charter Dunfermline Registrum, no. 190, records the founder as Lady Margerie, wife of Sir David Lindsay of Luffness, 3rd Lord of Crawford. According to Ballingal, Elcho was originally attached to Dunfermline Abbey and later to the Abbey of Scone, but Stuart states that “from charter evidence this convent continued to be a dependency of the priory of May and the abbots of Reading.” A Cistercian house, Elcho was one of four monasteries founded along the Tay River, the others being Scone Abbey, which was Augustinian; Lindores Abbey, which was Tironensian, and Balmerino Abbey, which was another Cistercian house.

== Cistercian Order ==
As a Cistercian establishment, Elcho would have enforced one of the strictest monastic codes. The nuns would have lived at subsistence levels, strictly observing all fasts and refraining from conversation, except on religious subjects. Cistercians maintained “an establishment of labourers” for agricultural labor, tilling, gardening, tending orchards and fields, and keeping sheep and cattle.

== Inhabitants ==
Historian Kimm Curran has pointed out that women in medieval Scottish convents came primarily from families in the surrounding area, “most within a fifteen-mile radius of their convent.” Ballingal believed likewise, showing that the roll for the year 1532 listed eleven nuns whose surnames are all connected with the district: Elinor Stewart, Christian Moncrief, Kathryn (or Katrina) Smith, Christian Redpath, Margaret Swinton, Isabel Barclay, Margaret Towers, Elizabeth Pollok, Christian (or Christine) Wemyss, Isobel Wedderburn, and Eupheme Leslie, the prioress.

Euphemia Leslie (often presented in documents as Eupheme, Eufeme, or Euphame] is perhaps the most well-known prioress, yet her parentage and family connections have been the subject of much speculation.

- She has been identified as the illegitimate daughter of Walter Leslie, parish priest at Kirkton of Menmuir (a parish within today's Angus).
- Based on the fact that her personal seal bore the arms of Leslie and Stewart of Atholl, historian Marion L. Stavert has suggested her father was probably James Leslie, 2nd baron of Pitcaple, and her mother, a daughter of John Stewart, Earl of Atholl, though there is no record of a marriage between the two.
- In his history of the family of Leslie, Col. Charles Joseph Leslie states unequivocally that she was the daughter Walter Leslie, parson at Monymusk, and his second wife, Elizabeth Stewart, daughter of the earl of Atholl. (Walter Leslie was the son of James Leslie, 2nd Baron of Pitcaple, and his wife Elizabeth Seton, daughter of the baron of Meldrum.)
- Others have associated her with the Leslies of Rothes.
- She is also said to be the sister (or half-sister or daughter) of Robert Leslie, who was procurator for the convent in the arrangements regarding the succession of Euphemia to the position of prioress.

Janet Leslie, niece of Euphemia Leslie, was at the convent during her aunt's tenure as prioress, 1539-40 specifically.

A known subprioress of Elcho (1525–26) was Elizabeth Rollock, who is later listed as a nun (1532–40). Though the prioresses would have come mainly from wealthy families, Curran speculates that some of the nuns were daughters of common folk, noting specifically Katrina Smith, whose surname, she believes, indicates humble origins. Certainly it is known that not all of the nuns were literate. In a document of 1532, the prioress signed as “Eufem priores with our hand,” but the names of the other nine, who were recorded as “siesciens scribere” (not knowing to write), were written down by the notary.

The name of Elizabeth Pait is known inasmuch as she was listed as receiving a pension from Elcho and was mentioned in Euphemia Leslie's will. However, her family is unknown.

Not all residents at the priory were nuns. Margaret, the second daughter of Scotland's king, James II, took up residence at Elcho during the reign of her nephew, James IV, arriving around Martinmas in 1489 with enough money to maintain her until 1502. The king's support for Margaret is apparent in his account books, where “supplies for the Lady Margaret” are frequently itemized, once with the specific notation of “a new dress for the ladye in Elquo.” Margaret was not a nun, but as Ballingal explains, “[I]n those unsettled times a religious house was the only safe place for an unprotected lady.” The king's interest in Elcho persisted, since Margaret Swinton of Kimmerghame suggested having royal protection under James IV when she was prioress in 1503. Indeed, on 20 June that year, he signed a deed in which he granted his “firm peace and protection to the Prioress and the religious women with her for their lands, their men, and their whole possessions and goods, moveable and immoveable, ecclesiastical and secular.” Notice of this service was published on 1 July at the market cross of Haddington in East Lothian since some of the property of the priory, the Standards (or Standardlandis), was situated in the constabulary of Haddington.

== 16th-century insolvency and recovery ==
Euphemia Leslie was apparently brought up at Elcho, and at the age of 18 sought papal dispensation to become the convent's prioress, a request that was granted by a papal bull c. 1524/5. This bull also called for the resignation of Elizabeth Swinton, under whose headship the monastery had been brought near financial ruin. Dame Elizabeth maintained the problems were brought on not by her personal mismanagement, but by the violence of John Stewart, 3rd Earl of Atholl, and Bishop Andrew Stewart of Caithness, who, with a force of 80 armed men, had forced their way into the monastery and confined her in a chamber. For three years or more, due to various pleas against the monastery which “uplifted the fruits and possessions ‘by force and arms,’” the only way she could sustain and protect the monastery was to sell priory possessions such as “cups and other precious things.” Whatever the cause of the disaster, it was up to Euphemia Leslie to reinvigorate the priory. To this end, her brother Robert Leslie of Innerpeffray, devised various ways to help the monastery recover financially, including the expenditure of his own money to redeem the cups and to sustain the monastery for two years. In return, Dame Euphemia “granted him a charter of the lands of Kinnaird and the ‘feu-farm’ of the same and also the fermes [feus] of the lands of Binning amounting respectively to 50 and 21 merks.”

== Assassination ==
As David II was preparing to invade England in 1346, he summoned his barons to meet at Perth. Among these were Raghnall Mac Ruaidhrí and William III, Earl of Ross, from whom Raghnall held Kintail. Responding to the call, Raghnall quartered his men at the priory of Elcho a few miles from the city. He apparently was planning to meet up with the king the following day, but during the night, earl William, who had entered into a feud with Raghnall, took advantage of his vassal’s proximity. In the middle of the night, he broke into the monastery, killed Raghnall and seven of his men, and fled north, others following, so that the king was left short-handed on the eve of his invasion. The act of treachery was deemed a bad omen by many, and, in fact, soon after, David was taken captive in England, where he remained a prisoner for eleven years.

== Mugdrum Cross ==
According to local tradition, the nuns of Elcho would annually make their way south to Ecclesia Magridin, or Exmagirdle, in Fife to pay respects to Saint Magridin. Along the way, they would stop at Mugdrum Cross (the name Mugdrum being a corrupted pronunciation of Magridin), where they would be met by the monks of Lindores Abbey. At the cross, they greeted each other and paid their devotions to the saint before proceeding on to Ecclesia Magridin. The causeway on which the monks traveled to Mugdrum can no longer be seen, though James Cant reported that parts were still visible near Muirmouth in 1774.

== Attack and decline ==
After Scotland’s defeat by England’s Henry VIII at the Battle of Pinkie Cleugh, September 1547, the English tried to establish themselves in the Scottish Lowlands and Border areas, and on 29 December the English commander at Broughty “sent Mr. Wyndham to burn a nunnery within 2 miles of St. Johnstoun [Perth] who brought away all the nuns and many gentlemen’s daughters at school with them.”

Sir John Wemyss, who was charged with their protection, came to their assistance after this attack, giving them money for repairs to the church and other buildings. He also lent them twenty bolls (6,300 lbs.) of barley, which they gratefully acknowledged, promising to repay the barley from the following year's crop. A few years later, he lent them 200 merks to relieve debts which were about to place them “under process of cursing,” a form of excommunication which has been described as “legal execution against person and property” and “the preliminary step of a warrant for arrest and imprisonment, and for the impounding and seizure of goods.” In such a case, the religious work of the priory would have come to an end.

Unable to repay Wemyss, the priory feued (i.e., leased) to him the Mains and Grange of Elcho for £40 Scots yearly. “Thus, by the time of the Reformation of 1560, all the priory lands except the building itself and its orchard were in the hands of John Wemyss who continued to look after the nuns’ affairs until his death in 1572. However, it would appear that they were unable to return to Elcho as it was beyond their means to repair.”

By the end of 1570, Euphemia Leslie had died and the commendatorship of the priory had passed to Andrew Moncrieff, who conveyed the monastery along with its “orchards, precincts, and pertinents” to his brother William, describing them all as “lying waste and without inhabitant.” Though no longer at the monastery, the nuns were probably still in the neighborhood, possibly under Wemyss's protection, as they “appointed him their procurator to pursue the commendator and his father for satisfaction and sustentation of them during their lives.” Euphemia Leslie and two of her servants are known to have resided in a property in Perth from the time they left the priory until her death.

One of them, Helen Stewart, married and, with her husband, acknowledged receiving a yearly pension of 20 merks from the rents of Elcho paid by the then laird of Wemyss.

== Remains ==
Very little remains today of the priory of Elcho. In 1760, Bishop Richard Pococke could still see “the tower of the church and the foundations of the buildings,” and in 1789, some remains of the nunnery were still visible “encompassed with an orchard.” However, by 1905, James Ballingal noted that Grange of Elcho had “upon it the scarcely visible remnants of Elcho nunnery,” and in the 1960s, archaeologists reported only “grassed-over foundations of at least two rectangular buildings.”

Archaeological excavations occurred at the site of Elcho priory between October 1968 and July 1973. Though it cannot be known with certainty whether burials unearthed at the site were made during the time when the nunnery was active, excavators discovered skeletal remains of 31 persons: 21 infants, children, and young adults; and 10 adults, both male and female, ranging in age from 20 to 55. These were probably the remains of persons who would have expected a privilege of burial at the site of the priory. This would include patrons of the nunnery and their families as well as the families of the lay workers who farmed and maintained the priory's lands.

Artifacts found at the priory also included pottery, stained glass, pins and lace-ends for shrouds, and parts of a bronze lamp. Also uncovered were Scottish coins from the reign of James IV (1488-1513) and English coins from that of Henry VIII (1509-1547); an iron key; leatherworking tools; and items of worked bone, including a die, two beads (possibly rosary beads), and parts of possible handles).

Animal bones discovered at the site revealed the presence of both domesticated animals and farm animals: cattle, sheep or goats, pigs, birds, fish and shellfish, a horse, a dog, a cat, a hare, a squirrel, and possibly a roe deer.

== Prioresses ==
- Agnes of Arroch (fl. 1282)
- Euphemia O'Beolan, Countess of Ross (c 1394-1398)
- Isobella (fl. 1445)
- Elizabeth of Aberlady (fl. 1485)
- Margaret Swinton (1493–1511)
- Elizabeth Swinton (1511–1527)
- Magdalen (fl. r. James V)
- Euphemia Leslie (14 January 1529 - c 1570)

== Depictions in works of fiction ==
- The Fair Maid of Perth by Sir Walter Scott
- Lord of the Black Isle by Elaine Coffman
