= Robert Galbraith (judge) =

Scottish Lord of Session

Robert Galbraith (died 1543) was a Scottish Lord of Session (Law Lord).

Robert Galbraith was a son of David Galbraith of Kimmerghame. He was one of the advocates appointed when first the College of Senators was instituted, and was admitted a Lord of Session in Ordinary (Senator of the College of Justice) on 7 November 1537.

Galbraith was a priest and treasurer of the Chapels Royal at Stirling, in which capacity he received a charter of the lands of Mydwyn Schelis, near Berwick, dated 5 July 1528. He was advocate to Queen Margaret Tudor, wife of James IV of Scotland, and as such made his protest on 1 September 1528 in Parliament against any prejudice to her claim for debt against the Earl of Angus, being occasioned by Angus' forfeiture.

In 1543 he was murdered by John Carkettle, a burgess of Edinburgh, and others, on account of favour which he was alleged to have shown to Sir William Sinclair of Herdmanston in a suit before him. The murderers were cited before Parliament, but nothing is known of their fate. He left some reports of cases, which are cited as the Book of Galbraith by the compiler of James Balfour's Practicks.
