= Kinnaird, Atholl =

Coordinates: 56.711857°N 3.708717°W

Kinnaird: Scottish Gaelic: An Ceann Àrd
- Location within Perth and Kinross
- Population: 2,564
- OS grid reference: NN955591
- Council area: Perth and Kinross
- Lieutenancy area: Perth and Kinross
- Country: Scotland
- Sovereign state: United Kingdom
- Post town: PITLOCHRY
- Postcode district: PH16
- Dialling code: 01796
- Police: Scotland
- Fire: Scottish
- Ambulance: Scottish
- UK Parliament: Angus and Perthshire Glens
- Scottish Parliament: Tayside North Mid Scotland and Fife
- Website: www.pitlochry.org

Kinnaird (Scottish Gaelic: An Ceann Àrd, "high headland") is a village in Atholl, and the Perth and Kinross council area of Scotland. It lies on the Kinnaird Burn, one mile from Pitlochry on the A924 road.

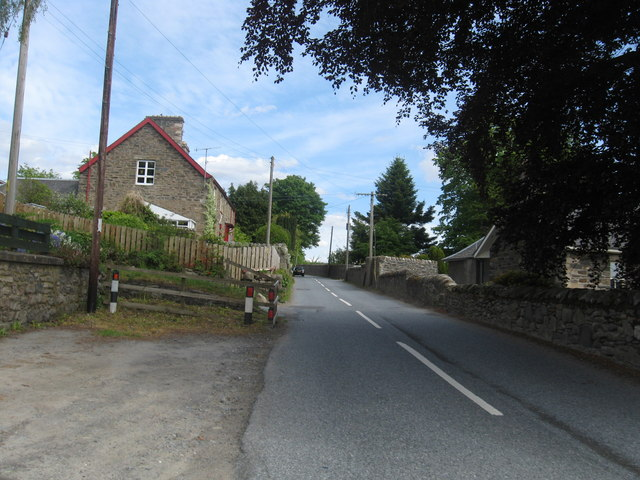
Kinnaird
