= Durtal =

- Commune
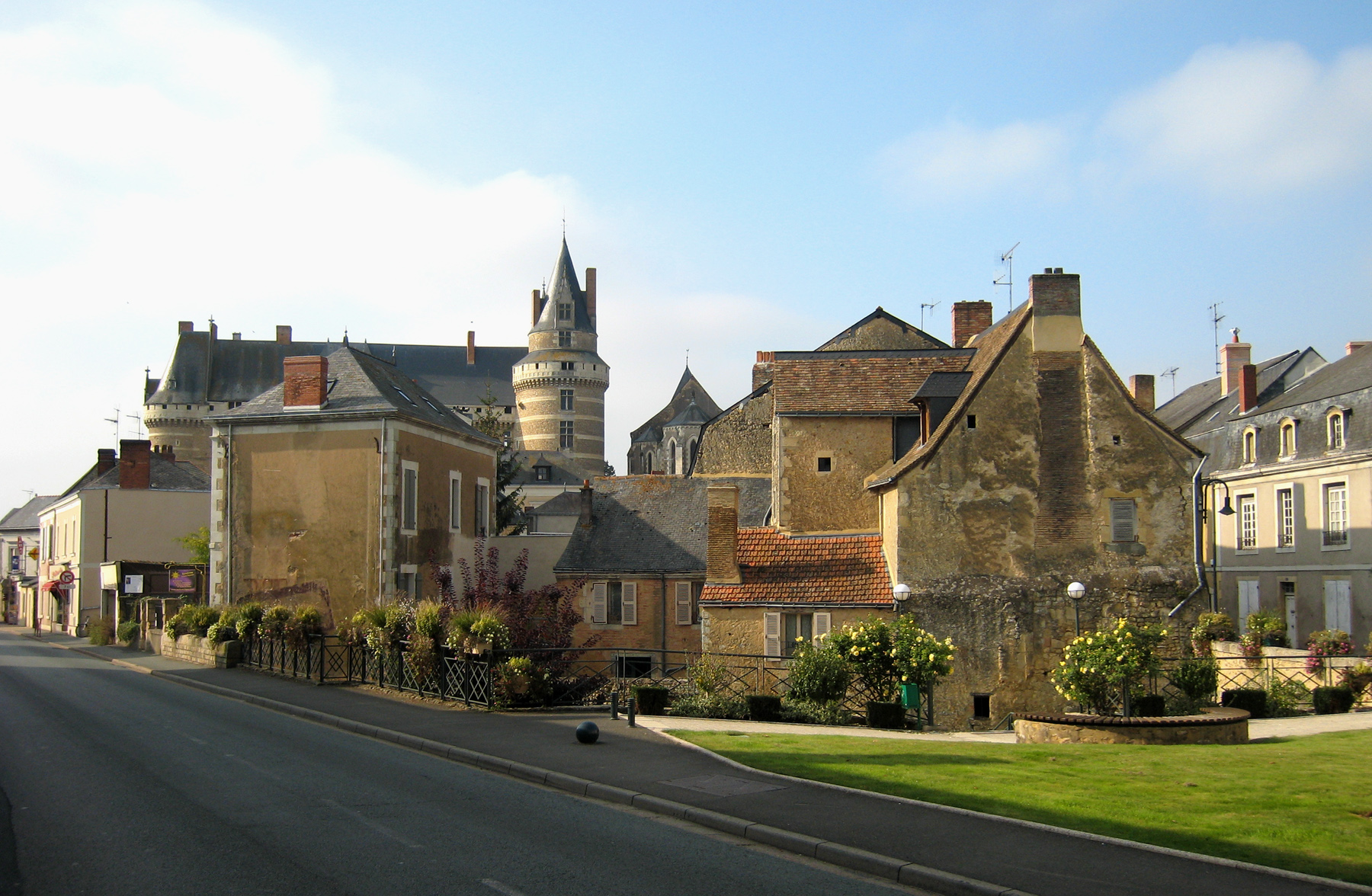
- The centre of Durtal with the chateau

- Coat of arms
- Location of Durtal
- Location within France Location within Pays de la Loire
- Coordinates: 47°40′22″N 0°14′24″W
- Country: France
- Region: Pays de la Loire
- Department: Maine-et-Loire
- Arrondissement: Angers
- Canton: Tiercé

Government
  - Mayor (2020–2026): Pascal Farion
- Area^{1}: 60.58 km^{2} (23.39 sq mi)
- Elevation: 34 m (112 ft)
- Highest elevation: 94 m (308 ft)
- Lowest elevation: 21 m (69 ft)
- Population (2023): 3,386
  - Density: 55.89/km^{2} (144.8/sq mi)
- Time zone: UTC+01:00 (CET)
  - Summer (DST): UTC+02:00 (CEST)
- INSEE/Postal code: 49127 /49430
- ^{1} French Land Register data, which excludes lakes, ponds, glaciers > 1 km^{2} (0.386 sq mi or 247 acres) and river estuaries.

Durtal (French pronunciation: [dyʁtal]) is a commune in the Maine-et-Loire department in western France. It is around 32 km north-east of Angers the department capital.

== Population ==
Historical population
Year	Pop.	±% p.a.
1968	3,161	—
1975	3,251	+0.40%
1982	3,240	−0.05%
1990	3,195	−0.17%
1999	3,224	+0.10%
2007	3,315	+0.35%
2012	3,395	+0.48%
2017	3,387	−0.05%
2023	3,386	−0.00%
Source: INSEE

== See also ==
- Communes of the Maine-et-Loire department
