= 1558 =

1558 in various calendars
- Gregorian calendar: 1558; MDLVIII
- Ab urbe condita: 2311
- Armenian calendar: 1007; ԹՎ ՌԷ
- Assyrian calendar: 6308
- Balinese saka calendar: 1479–1480
- Bengali calendar: 964–965
- Berber calendar: 2508
- English Regnal year: 4 Ph. & M. – 1 Eliz. 1
- Buddhist calendar: 2102
- Burmese calendar: 920
- Byzantine calendar: 7066–7067
- Chinese calendar: 丁巳年 (Fire Snake); 4255 or 4048 — to — 戊午年 (Earth Horse); 4256 or 4049
- Coptic calendar: 1274–1275
- Discordian calendar: 2724
- Ethiopian calendar: 1550–1551
- Hebrew calendar: 5318–5319
- Hindu calendars
- Vikram Samvat: 1614–1615
- Shaka Samvat: 1479–1480
- Kali Yuga: 4658–4659
- Holocene calendar: 11558
- Igbo calendar: 558–559
- Iranian calendar: 936–937
- Islamic calendar: 965–966
- Japanese calendar: Kōji 4 / Eiroku 1 (永禄元年)
- Javanese calendar: 1477–1478
- Julian calendar: 1558; MDLVIII
- Korean calendar: 3891
- Minguo calendar: 354 before ROC 民前354年
- Nanakshahi calendar: 90
- Thai solar calendar: 2100–2101
- Tibetan calendar: མེ་མོ་སྦྲུལ་ལོ་ (female Fire-Snake); 1684 or 1303 or 531 — to — ས་ཕོ་རྟ་ལོ་ (male Earth-Horse); 1685 or 1304 or 532

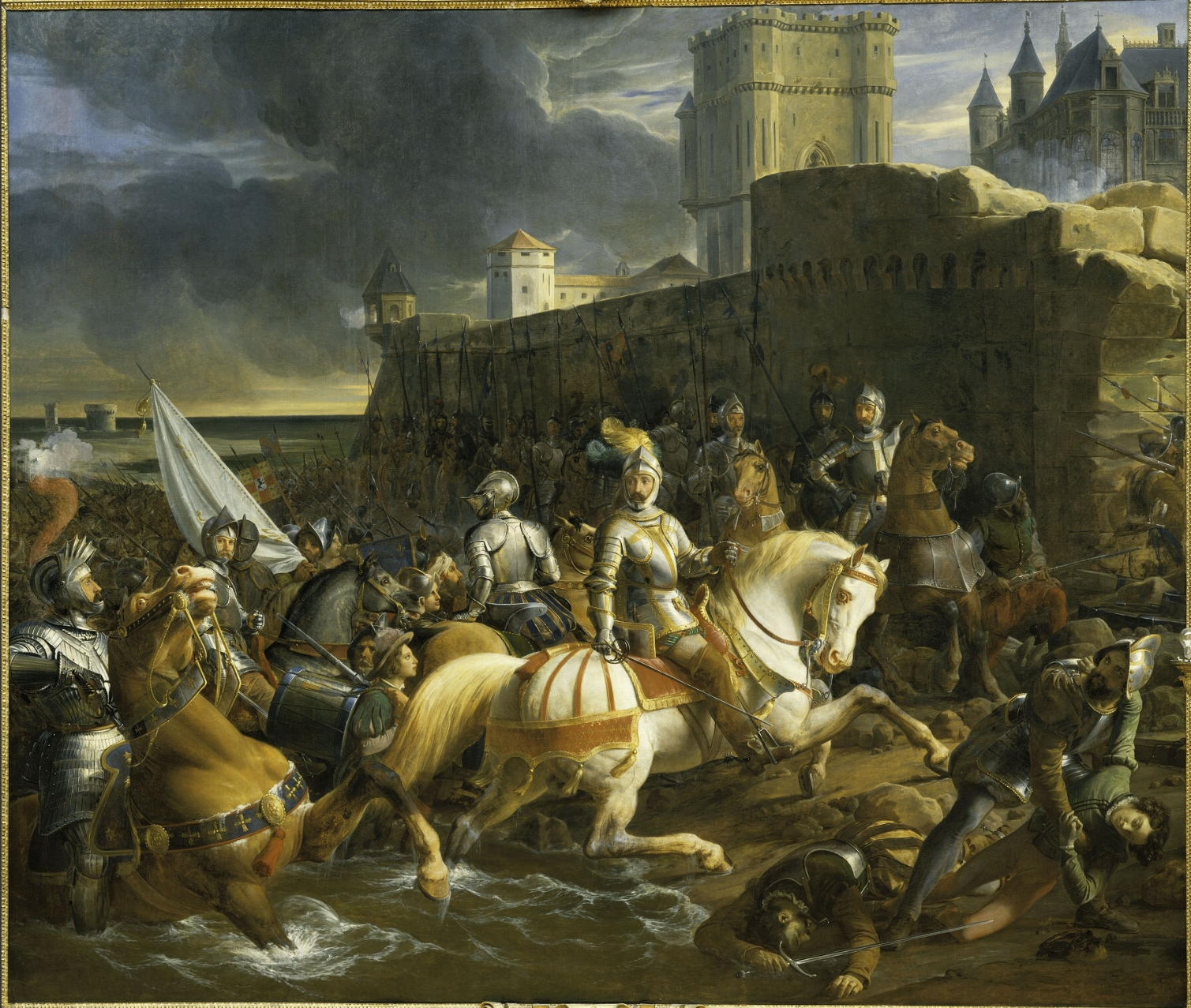
January 7: France recaptures Calais from England

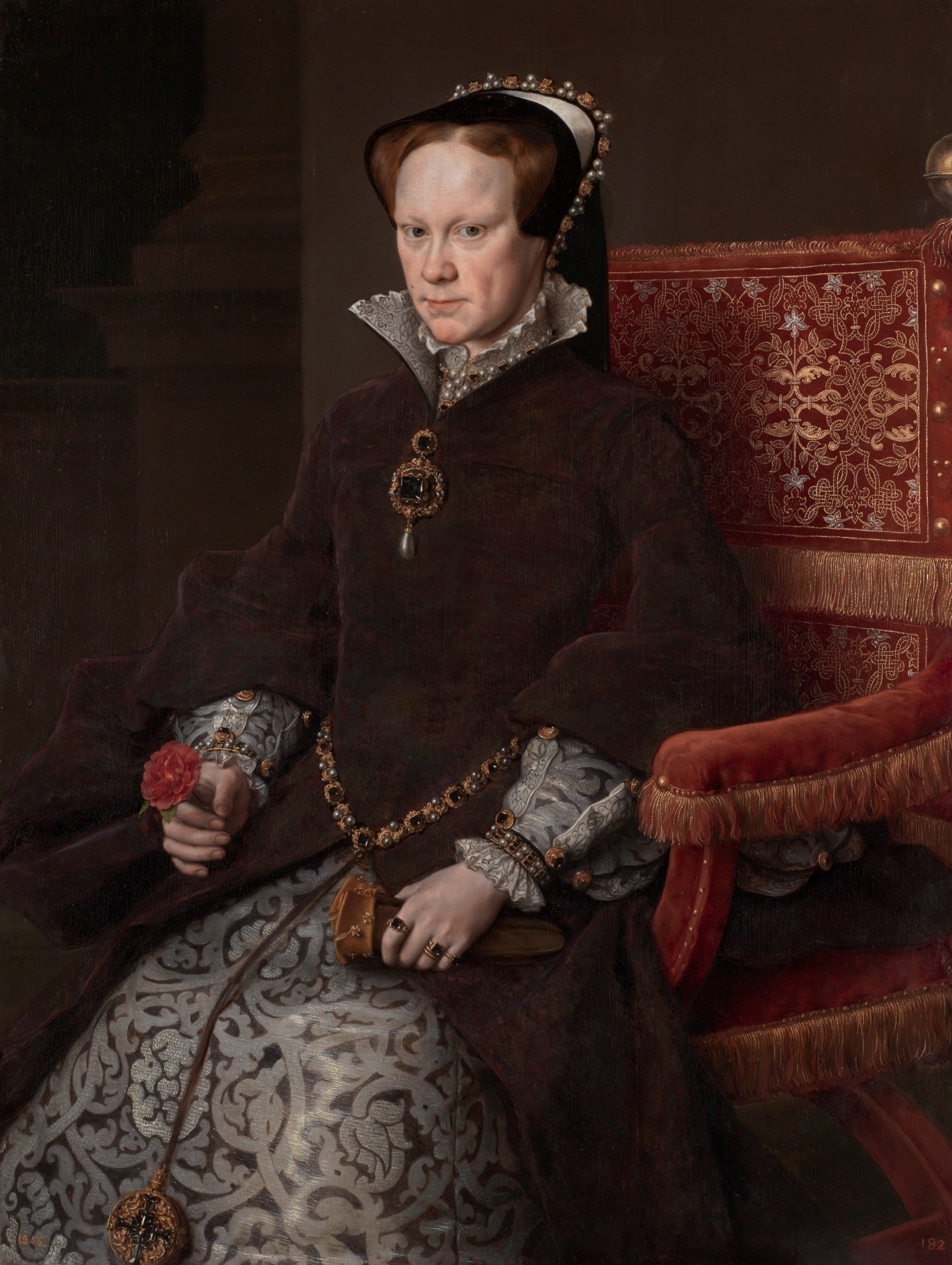
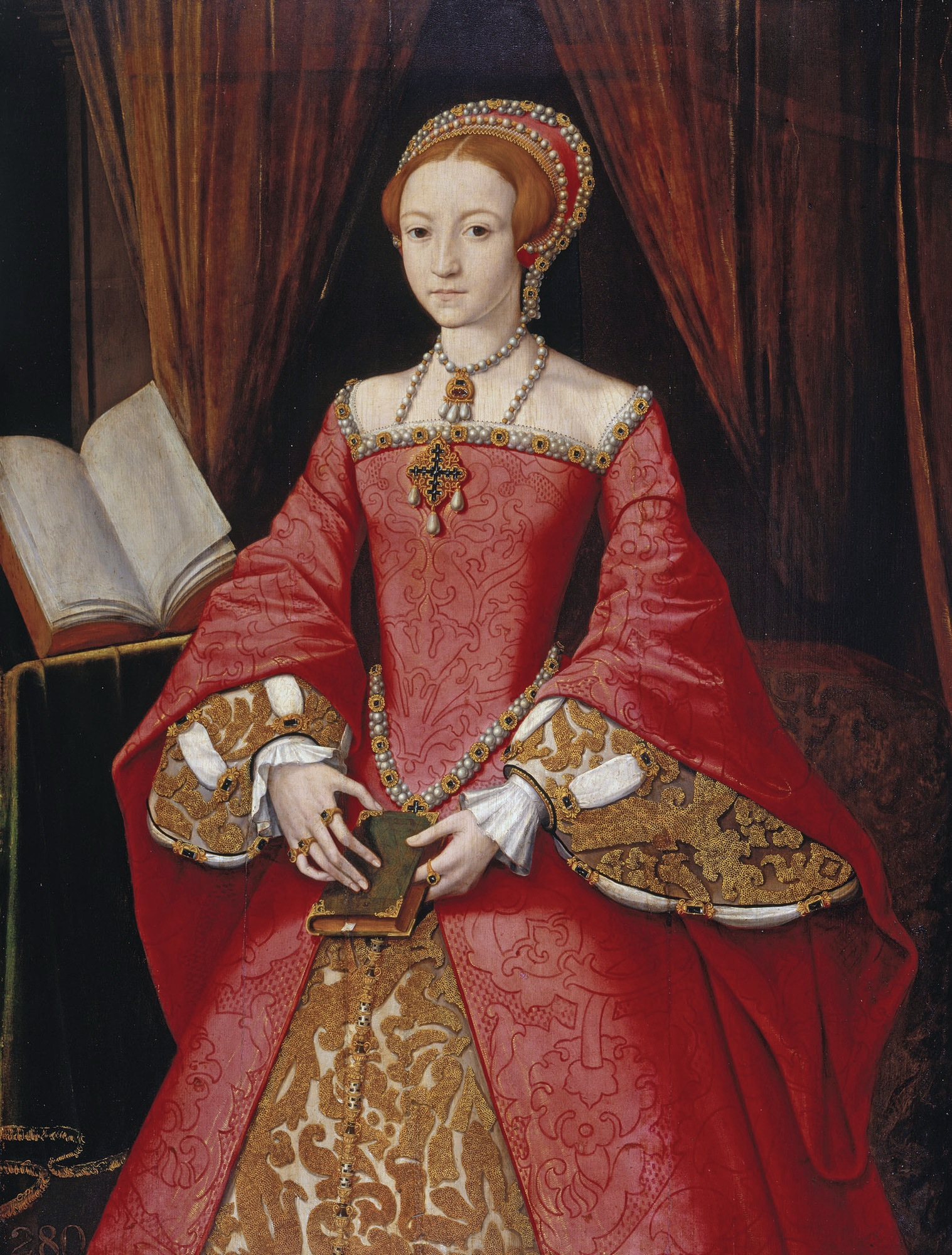
November 17: Queen Mary I of England dies, and her half-sister begins her reign as Queen Elizabeth I

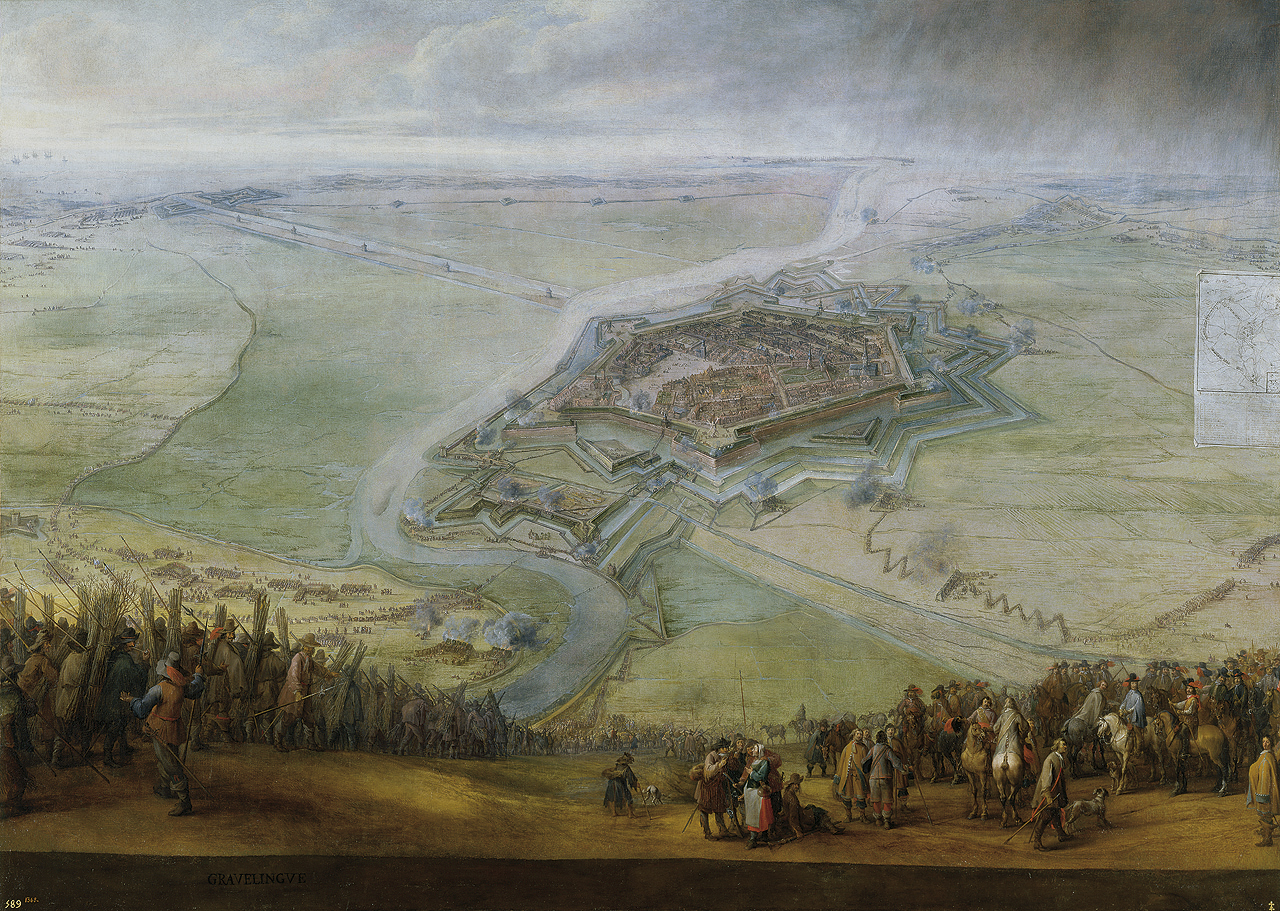
July 13: Battle of Gravelines

Year 1558 (MDLVIII) was a common year starting on Saturday of the Julian calendar.

== Events ==
=== January–March ===
- January 7 – French troops, led by François, Duke of Guise, take Calais, the last continental possession of the Kingdom of England, in the Siege of Calais.
- January 22 – The Livonian War begins.
- February 2 – The University of Jena is founded in Thuringia, Germany.
- February 4 – (16th day of 1st month of Eiroku 1) Takeda Shingen becomes the shugo (military governor) of Shinano Province after his successful military campaign there.
- February 5 – Arauco War: Pedro de Avendaño, with sixty men, captures Caupolicán (the Mapuche Gran Toqui), who is leading their first revolt against the Spanish Empire (near Antihuala), encamped with a small band of followers.
- March 8 – The city of Pori (Swedish: Björneborg) is founded by Duke John on the shores of the Gulf of Bothnia.

=== April–June ===
- April 17 – The siege of Thionville in the Duchy of Luxembourg, is started by the French Army, led by François, Duke of Guise.
- April 24 – Mary, Queen of Scots, marries Francis, Dauphin of France, at Notre-Dame de Paris.
- May 3 – The Imperial Diet of the Holy Roman Empire gives recognition to Ferdinand as Holy Roman Emperor, two months after his proclamation on March 14 as the successor to his brother Charles V.
- June 13 – An armada of ships from the Ottoman Empire, dispatched by Sultan Suleiman the Magnificent at the request of King Henry II of France, sails into the Bay of Naples at Italy and attacks the city of Sorrento.
- June 23 – France is successful in the siege of Thionville in the Duchy of Luxembourg and recovers the fortress from the Spanish Empire after an operation that began on April 17 and lasted more than two months.

=== July–September ===
- July 9 – The Ottoman Empire, with 15,000 troops and 150 warships, besieges the Spanish garrison at Ciutadella de Menorca at Spain's Balearic Islands. When the town falls on July 17, the 3,099 surviving inhabitants are sold into slavery.
- July 13 – Battle of Gravelines: Near the border between the Kingdom of France and the Spanish Netherlands, Spanish forces led by Lamoral, Count of Egmont, and assisted by the English Navy, inflict a major defeat on the French forces of Marshal Paul de Thermes.
- July 18 – The city of Tartu, capital of the Bishopric of Dorpat (in modern-day Estonia) surrenders to Russia.
- August 22 – In Spain, Bartolomé Carranza, the Roman Catholic Archbishop of Toledo, is arrested at Torrelaguna on orders of the Grand Inquisitor, Fernando de Valdés y Salas. Carranza is brought a prisoner to Valladolid to face accusations of heresy. He remains in prison for eight years before being transferred to Rome for the Pope to hear his appeal.

=== October–December ===
- October 17 – Postal history of Poland: King Sigismund II Augustus appoints an Italian merchant living in Kraków to organise a consolidated postal service in Poland, the origin of Poczta Polska.
- November 6 – On her deathbed, Queen Mary of England designates her half-sister, Elizabeth, as her successor. Both Mary and Elizabeth are daughters of the late King Henry VIII.
- November 15 – The five Canterbury Martyrs, three men and two women, are burned at the stake, becoming the last of 312 Protestants put to death for heresy during the reign of England's Roman Catholic ruler, Queen Mary. Queen Mary dies two days later, bringing an end to her campaign. During the final year of Mary's reign, 49 Protestants are burned at the stake and three others die in prison while awaiting execution.
- November 17 – Queen Mary, a devout Roman Catholic dies of uterine cancer at the age of 42, and is succeeded by her younger half-sister Elizabeth, an adherent to the Protestant Church of England, beginning the Elizabethan era in British history.
- December 5 – Less than three weeks of becoming Queen of England, Elizabeth summons the members of the English Parliament with orders to assemble at Westminster on January 23. Under Elizabeth's agenda, the Parliament is charged with restoring the laws passed at the beginning of the English Reformation, and repealing the reforms made during the reign of Queen Mary.

=== Unknown ===
- John Knox's attack on female rulers, The First Blast of the Trumpet Against the Monstruous Regiment of Women, is published anonymously from Geneva.
- English explorer Anthony Jenkinson travels from Moscow to Astrakhan and Bukhara. He is the first Englishman to note that the Amu Darya changed course, to start flowing into the Aral Sea.
- Queen Elizabeth I of England grants rest and refreshment to pilgrims and travellers who pass by the Holy Well Spring at Malvern in England.

=== Ongoing ===
- 1557 influenza pandemic.

== Births ==
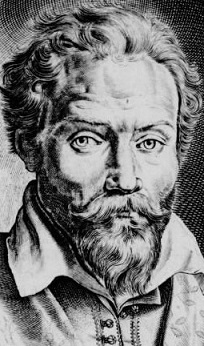
André du Laurens

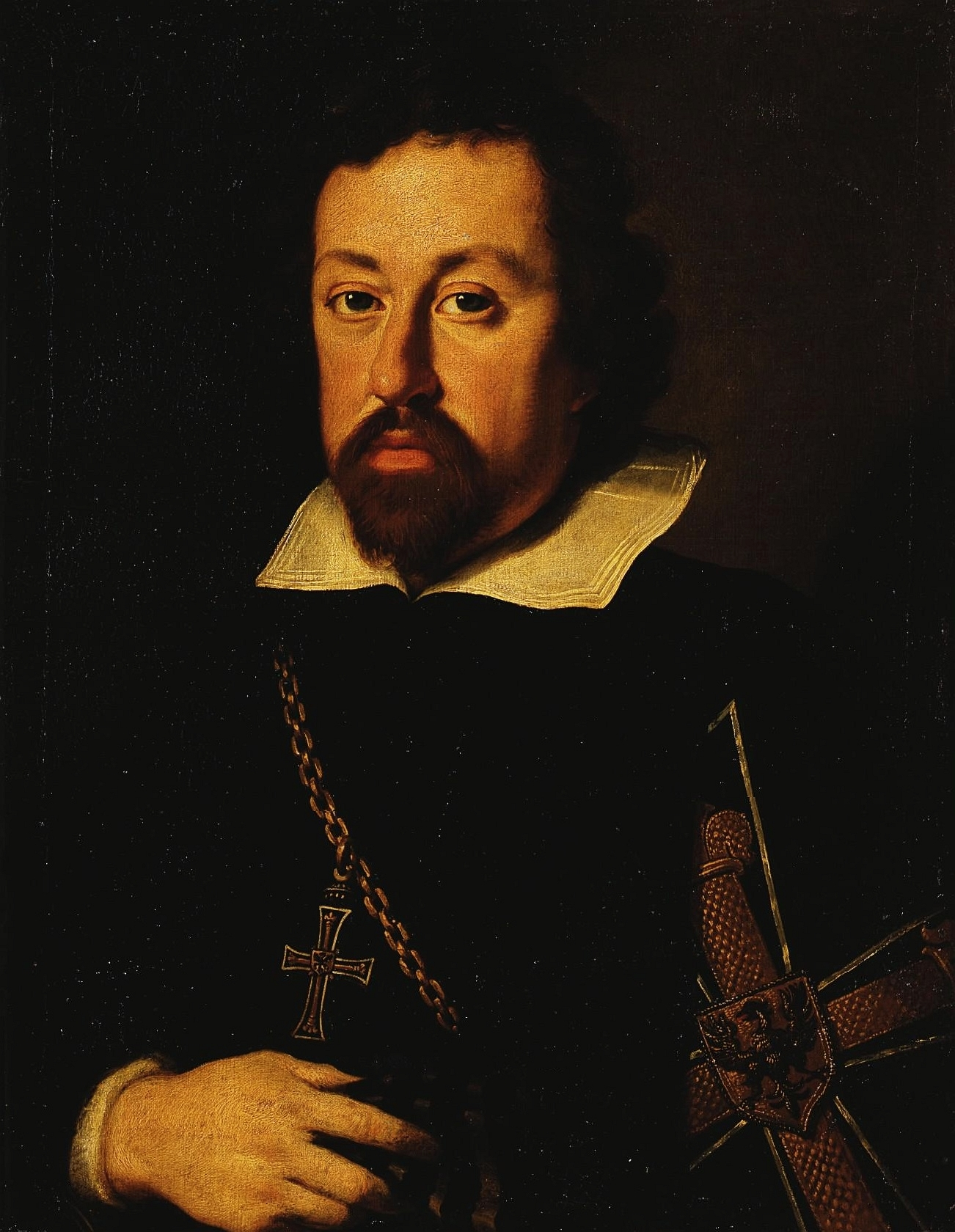
Maximilian III, Archduke of Austria

- January or February – Hendrik Goltzius, Dutch painter (d. 1617)
- January 16 – Jakobea of Baden, Margravine of Baden by birth, Duchess of Jülich-Cleves-Berg by marriage (d. 1597)
- January 29 – Paul Hentzner, German lawyer (d. 1623)
- March 7 – Johann VII, Duke of Mecklenburg-Schwerin (1576–1592) (d. 1592)
- April 30 – Mikołaj Oleśnicki the younger, Polish noble (d. 1629)
- June 15 – Margrave Andrew of Burgau, German nobleman, Cardinal, Bishop of Constance and Brixen (d. 1600)
- July 9 – David Origanus, German astronomer (d. 1628)
- July 11 – Robert Greene, English dramatist (d. 1592)
- August 2 – Herman van den Bergh, Dutch soldier in the Eighty Years' War (d. 1611)
- August 8 – George Clifford, 3rd Earl of Cumberland, English noble (d. 1605)
- August 19 – François de Bourbon, Prince of Conti (d. 1614)
- September 9 – Philippe Emmanuel, Duke of Mercœur, French soldier (d. 1602)
- September 24 – Ralph Eure, 3rd Baron Eure, English politician (d. 1617)
- October 12 – Maximilian III, Archduke of Austria (d. 1618)
- October 24 – Szymon Szymonowic, Polish writer (d. 1629)
- October 30 – Jacques-Nompar de Caumont, duc de La Force, Marshal of France (d. 1652)
- November 27 – Mingyi Swa, Crown Prince of Burma (d. 1593)
- December 3 – Gregorio Pagani, Italian painter (d. 1605)
- December 8 – François de La Rochefoucauld, French Catholic cardinal (d. 1645)
- December 9 – André du Laurens, French physician (d. 1609)
- date unknown
  - Meir Lublin, Polish rabbi (d. 1616)
  - Kōriki Masanaga, Japanese military commander (d. 1599)
  - Bessho Nagaharu, Japanese nobleman (d. 1580)
  - Olivier van Noort, first Dutchman to circumnavigate the world (d. 1627)
  - Chidiock Tichborne, English conspirator and poet (d. 1586)
  - Michael the Brave, Prince of Wallachia (1593–1601) (d. 1601)
  - Thomas Kyd, English playwright (d. 1594)
  - Françoise de Cezelli, French war hero (d. 1615)
- probable – Pierre Dugua, Sieur de Mons, French merchant (d. 1628)

== Deaths ==
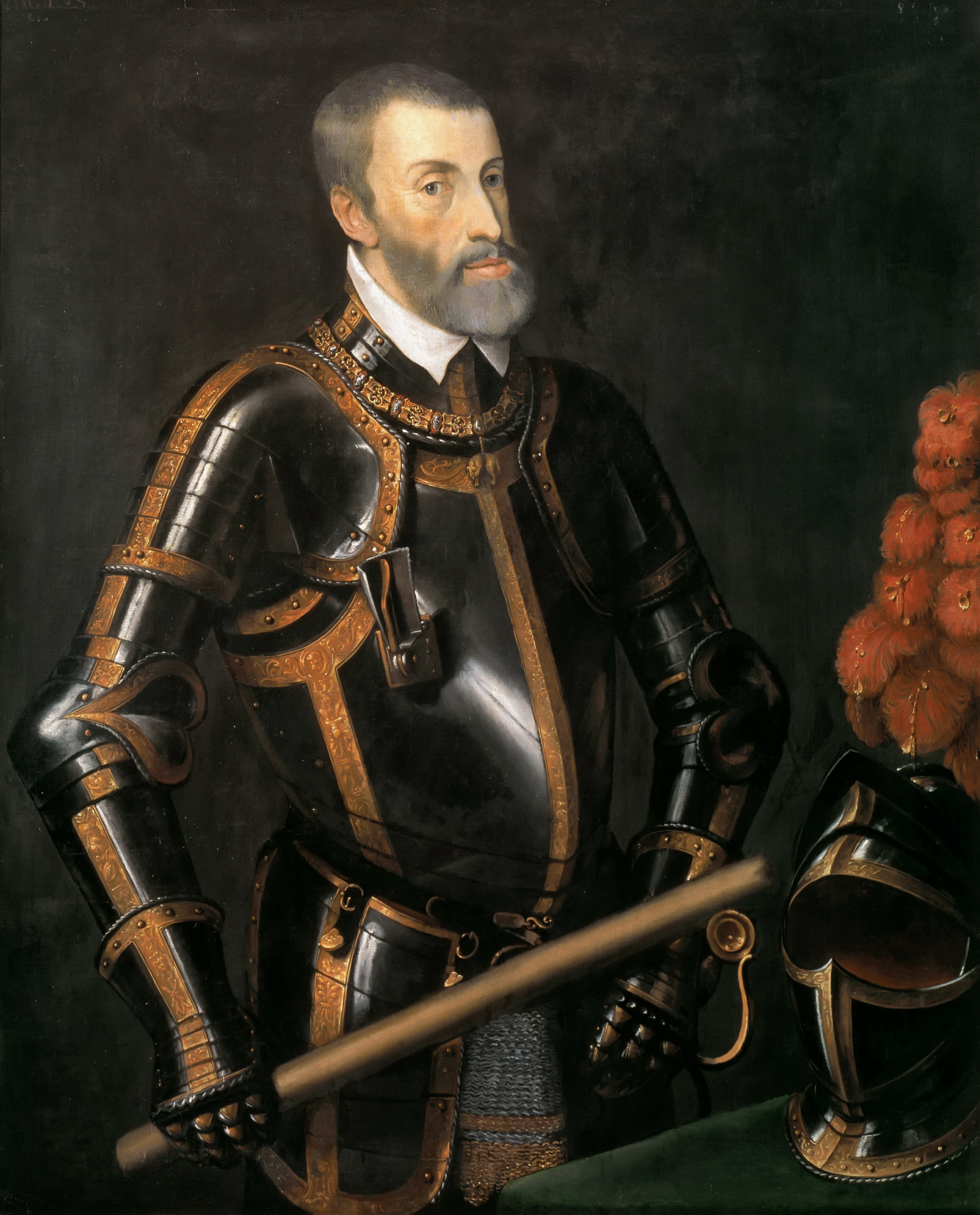
Emperor Charles V

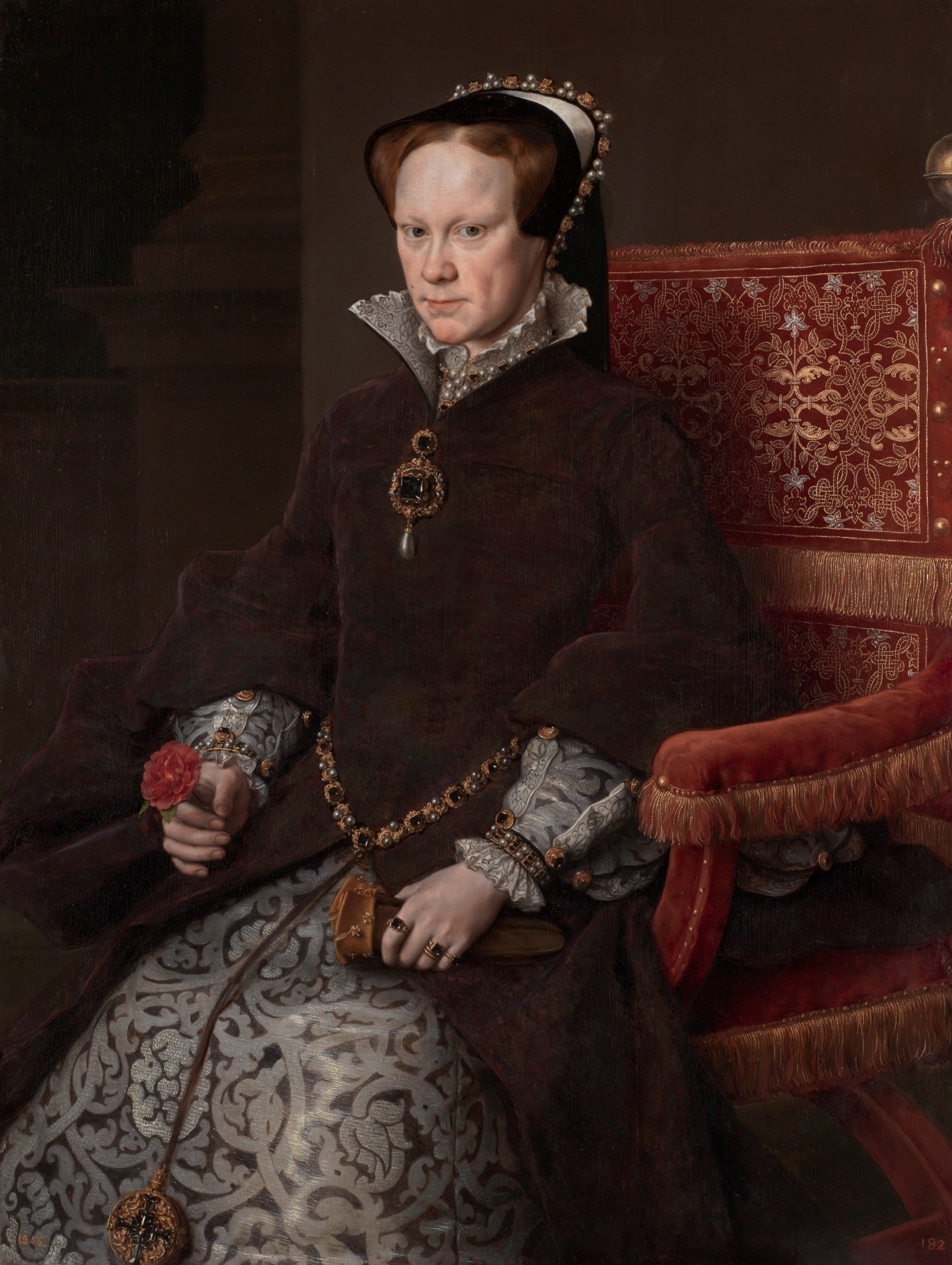
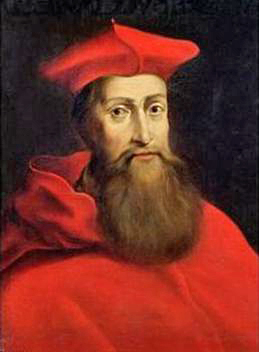
Queen Mary I of England and Cardinal Reginald Pole died on November 17, 1558
- January 28 – Jacob Micyllus, German humanist (b. 1503)
- February 25 – Eleanor of Austria, Queen of Portugal and France (b. 1498)
- February 27
  - Johann Faber of Heilbronn, controversial Catholic preacher (b. 1504)
  - Kunigunde of Brandenburg-Kulmbach, German noblewoman (b. 1524)
- March 6 – Luca Gaurico, Italian astrologer (b. 1475)
- March 24 – Anna van Egmont, Countess of Egmond and Buren (b. c. 1533)
- March 25 – Marcos de Niza, French Franciscan explorer (b. c. 1495)
- April 2 – Wolfgang of the Palatinate, Count Palatine of Neumarkt (b. 1494)
- April 15 – Hurrem Sultan, Ruthenian-born wife of Suleiman the Magnificent (b. c. 1500)
- April 20 – Johannes Bugenhagen, German reformer (b. 1485)
- April 26 – Jean Fernel, French physician (b. 1497)
- May 17 – Francisco de Sá de Miranda, Portuguese poet (b. 1485)
- May 19 – Juan Téllez-Girón, 4th Count of Ureña, Spanish count (b. 1494)
- May 25 – Elisabeth of Brandenburg, Duchess of Brunswick-Calenberg-Göttingen (1525–1540) (b. 1510)
- May 31 – Philip Hoby, English politician (b. 1505)
- June 28 – Thomas Darcy, 1st Baron Darcy of Chiche, English courtier (b. 1506)
- July 17 – George I of Württemberg-Mömpelgard (b. 1498)
- August 11 – Justus Menius, German Lutheran pastor (b. 1499)
- September 21 – Charles V, Holy Roman Emperor (b. 1500)
- October – Mellin de Saint-Gelais, French poet (b. c. 1491)
- October 18 – Maria of Austria, queen of Louis II of Hungary (b. 1505)
- October 21 – J. C. Scaliger, Italian scholar (b. 1484)
- November 1
  - Anne Brooke, Baroness Cobham, English noble (b. 1501)
  - Erhard Schnepf, German theologian (b. 1495)
- November 15 – Gilbert Kennedy, 3rd Earl of Cassilis, Scottish politician and judge (b. 1515)
- November 17
  - (bur.) Hugh Aston, English composer (b. 1485)
  - Queen Mary I of England (b. 1516)
  - Reginald Pole, Cardinal Archbishop of Canterbury (b. 1500)
- December 7 – Johann Forster, German theologian (b. 1496)
- December 16 – Thomas Cheney, Lord Warden of the Cinque Ports (b. c. 1485)
- December 19 – Cornelius Grapheus, Flemish writer (b. 1482)
- December 28 – Hermann Finck, German composer (b. 1527)
- date unknown
  - Archibald Campbell, 4th Earl of Argyll, Scottish nobleman and politician (b. 1507)
  - Robert Recorde, Welsh physician and mathematician (b. c. 1512)
