= William Lauder (poet) =

Scottish cleric and writer

William Lauder (c. 1520 – February 1573) was a sixteenth-century Scottish cleric, playwright, and poet.

== Early life ==
William Lauder was a native of the Lothians. The precise date and place of his birth, or anything regarding his family connections, have not yet been ascertained, although he is almost certainly a member of one of the great Lauder families of that time - Lauder of The Bass, or Lauder of Haltoun.

It appears that he had a liberal education and was probably intended for The Church. In the Registers of the University of St. Andrews the name Willielmus Lauder, Lothian is among the students who were incorporated in St Salvator's College in the year 1537.

== Ministry ==
Upon leaving the university the poet may have taken Holy Orders as a Roman Catholic priest and been connected with one of the religious establishments of Edinburgh. It is not known when he joined the Reformers, whether before, or subsequent to, the establishment of Protestantism, in August 1560. However about 1563 or 1564 he was admitted Minister of the united parishes of Forgandenny, Forteviot, and Muckarsie, in the Presbytery of Perth, and his name appears in the earliest Register of Ministers, and thair Stipends, sen the year of God 1567 when he was receiving £80 sterling per annum. However, in the margin of this very early Register, against his entry, it is written "Deid [sic] at Candilmes, 1572". This is confirmed in the accounts of the collectors for the 'Thirds of benefices for Perth and Strathearn', and where, in 1572, his "relict" is mentioned (but without giving her name).

== Literary career ==
He distinguished himself by his literary talents from an early date. In February 1549 the Treasurer's accounts show a payment to "Williame Lauder for making of his play and expensis maid thairupoun, £11:5:0" performed at the wedding celebrations of Alexander, Lord Gordon, and Lady Barbara Hamilton. Lauder provided a play, or dramatic representation, which was performed at the expense of the Magistrates and Council of Edinburgh for the Regent, Mary of Guise, on 28 December 1554, for which he was handsomely paid.

Four years later, Lauder's inventive powers were again exercised in producing one of those plays, or 'moralities', which were so common at that time, to celebrate the marriage of Mary, Queen of Scots with Francis, Dauphin of France, at Paris, in July 1558. The burgh council records and treasurer's accounts enable us to ascertain the nature of the last performance, in which the chief personages were the Seven Planets, and Cupid. There are numerous payments under the heading of "The expensis maid upone the triumphe and play at the mariage of the Quenis Grace, with the convoy, the [blank] day of Julij, anno 1558" whicj relate to the costumes and arrangements.

In 1827 the Reverend Peter Hall reprinted Lauder's Compendious Tractate, which had been published by John Skott in 1556. Interest was revived and two small poetical tracts by William Lauder in 1568 and printed before 1572 were also discovered. One of these tracts was entitled Ane Prettie Mirrour, or Conference betiux the faithful Protestant and the Dissemblit false Hypocreit, "printed at Edinburgh by Robert Lekpreuik" about 1570. At the end it states: "Quod William Lauder." Two further short poems followed, entitled Ane trew & breue Sentencius Discriptioun of the nature of Scotland, Twitching the Interteniment of virtewus men That laketh Ryches, "compyld be William Lauder, Minister of God's wourd, &c.," and Ane Gude Exempill Be the butterflie, instructing men to hait all Harlottrie. The latter has, at the end, "Quod William Lauder, Minister." A further poem was also bound into the volume, entitled The Lamenta[t]ioun Of the Pure, twitching the Miserabill Estait of this Present Warld, "Compylit be William Lauder, at Perth, Primo Fabruarie, 1568" (1568/9).

One of the most important, if not the best known, of Lauder's works is his Tract concernyng the Office and Dewtie of Kyngis, spiritvall pastoris, and temporall ivgis.
